= Érick Gutiérrez =

Mexican footballer (born 1995)

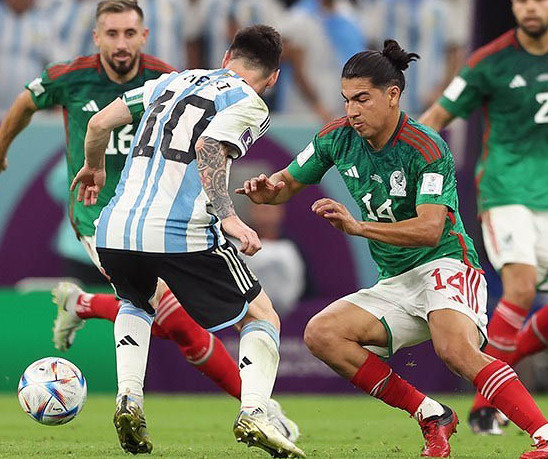
- Gutiérrez (right) facing-off with Lionel Messi at the 2022 World Cup

Personal information
- Full name: Érick Gabriel Gutiérrez Galaviz
- Date of birth: 15 June 1995 (age 31)
- Place of birth: Ahome, Sinaloa, Mexico
- Height: 1.76 m (5 ft 9 in)
- Position: Midfielder

Team information
- Current team: Toluca (on loan from Guadalajara)
- Number: 35

Youth career
- 2009–2013: Pachuca

Senior career*
Years	Team	Apps	(Gls)
2013–2018	Pachuca	144	(17)
2018–2023	PSV	94	(7)
2023–	Guadalajara	77	(4)
2026–	→ Toluca (loan)	6	(1)

International career^{‡}
2015	Mexico U20	8	(0)
2016	Mexico U23	5	(4)
2016–2023	Mexico	36	(1)
Medal record
Men's football
Representing Mexico
CONCACAF Gold Cup
Winner	2019 United States
Runner-up	2021 United States
Olympic Qualifying Championship
Winner	2015 United States
- * Club domestic league appearances and goals as of 20 October 2026 ‡ National team caps and goals as of 23 March 2023

Érick Gabriel Gutiérrez Galaviz (born 15 June 1995), also known as Guti, is a Mexican professional footballer who plays as a midfielder for Liga MX club Toluca, on loan from Guadalajara.

Gutiérrez began both his youth and professional career at Pachuca, winning the 2016 Clausura title and the 2016–17 CONCACAF Champions League in his five years with the club. During the 2015–2016 season, he was named captain of the team at the age of 20. In August 2018, he joined Eredivisie club PSV Eindhoven, winning two KNVB Cups and one Johan Cruyff Shield before returning to Mexico to join Guadalajara in 2023.

Gutiérrez has participated for various national youth teams, including the U-20 team and the U-23 side that played the 2016 Summer Olympics. At the senior level, Gutiérrez has represented Mexico at the 2018 and 2022 FIFA World Cup, and won the 2019 edition of the CONCACAF Gold Cup.

== Club career ==
=== Pachuca ===
Gutiérrez joined Liga MX club Pachuca at the age of 12. In his early career he started as a right-back, then moved to midfield. He made his debut on 26 October 2013 as a starter in a 0–0 draw at home against Cruz Azul. He made ten more appearances including 4 more starts that season. He was made a permanent starter at the beginning of the 2014–15 Liga MX season under the management of Diego Alonso. Gutiérrez scored his first Liga MX goal on 7 February 2015 in a 1–1 home draw against Toluca. In April 2016, at the age of 20, Gutiérrez was assigned as Pachuca's captain after only 70 league matches. At the end of the Clausura 2016, he was named on the tournament's Best XI.

In his time at the club, Gutiérrez amassed 144 league appearances.

=== PSV ===
On 29 August 2018, Gutiérrez joined Dutch club PSV Eindhoven on a five-year contract, joining up with international teammate Hirving Lozano. He was handed jersey number 25. On 15 September, he made his debut with PSV against ADO; within five minutes of being subbed in, Gutiérrez assisted in Lozano's goal as well as scoring himself in their 7–0 away win. Three days later, he made his UEFA Champions League debut against Barcelona, coming on in the 82nd minute for Pablo Rosario in PSV's 4–0 defeat. On 30 October, he would score his first KNVB Cup goal during the second round match against RKC Waalwijk, scoring in the first minute of the game but PSV would go on losing 3–2.

The following season, he was handed the number 15 jersey. In September, he picked up a hand injury while training with the national team and returned in a match against PEC Zwolle, coming on as a substitute and scoring the fourth goal of the 4–0 victory.

During the 2020–21 season, Gutiérrez suffered from two different injuries, only playing 150 minutes during the whole Eredivisie season. In the subsequent season, he became more important for PSV, playing more games and scoring a goal in the KNVB Cup Final against Ajax.

On 11 August 2022, it was announced that Gutiérrez had signed a contract extension with PSV that runs until 2025. This was just one day after he scored in the team's 4–3 aggregate victory over AS Monaco in their Champions League Qualification game.

=== Late career ===
In July 2023, Gutiérrez returned to Mexico and joined Guadalajara for a reported transfer fee of €5.5 million. In January 2026, Guadalajara manager Gabriel Milito dropped Gutiérrez from the squad. After spending six months on the sidelines, Gutiérrez joined Toluca on a one‑year loan.

== International career ==
=== Youth ===
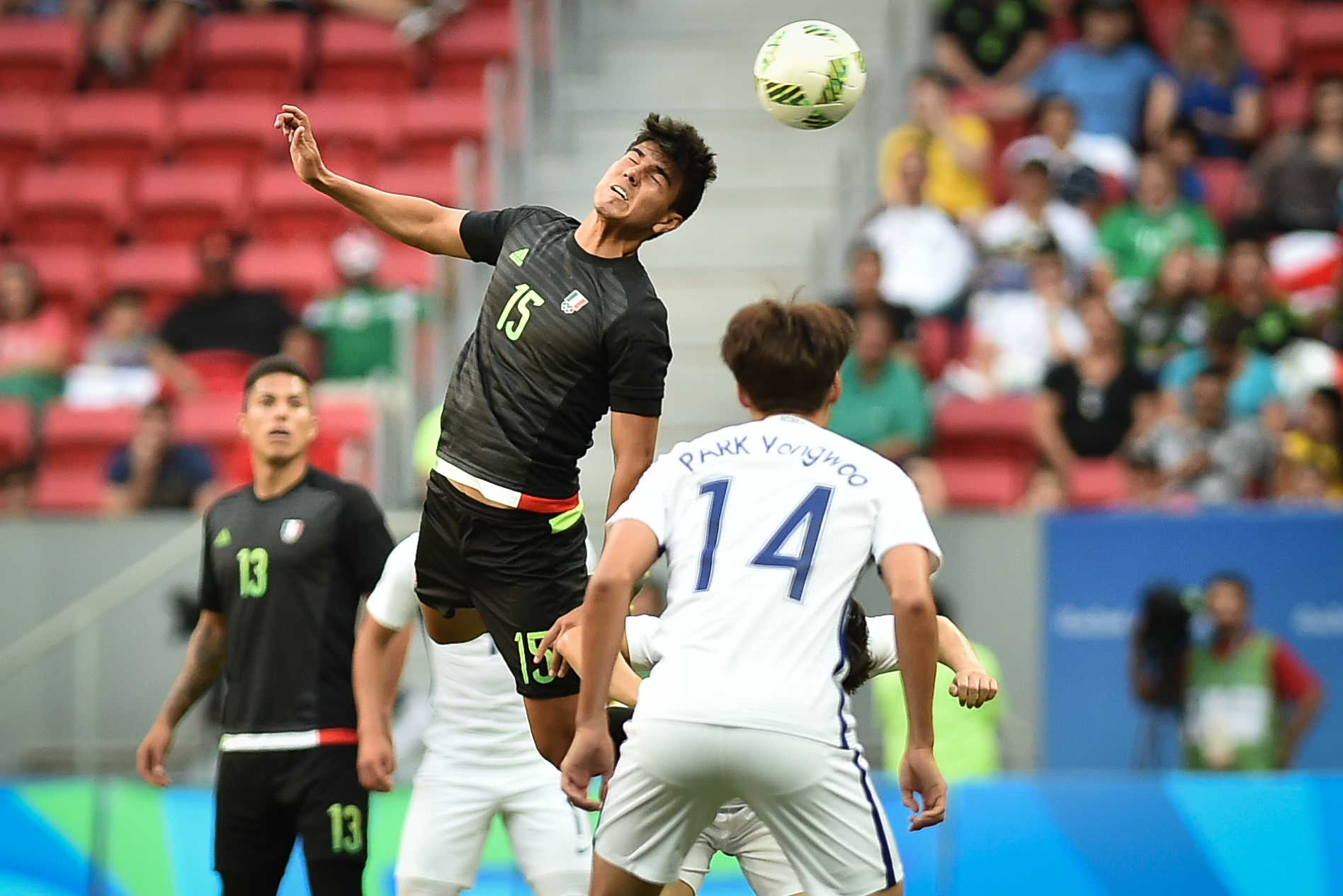
Gutiérrez playing against South Korea in the 2016 Summer Olympics

Gutiérrez was called up by the under-20 team managed by Sergio Almaguer for the 2015 CONCACAF U-20 Championship. He was named captain of the team despite only playing only in four matches out of the six as Mexico went on to win the tournament and earned a berth to the 2015 FIFA U-20 World Cup in New Zealand. He would also be listed on the tournament's Best XI.

Selected to participate at the 2015 FIFA U-20 World Cup, he was Mexico's captain during the tournament as the team failed to pass the group stage.

On 18 September 2015, Gutiérrez was selected by coach Raúl Gutiérrez to play in the 2015 CONCACAF Men's Olympic Qualifying Championship.

He was also picked to represent Mexico at the 2016 Summer Olympics in Rio de Janeiro, Brazil. On 7 August, he scored four goals as Mexico bounced back to win 5–1 after Fiji took the lead in the first half of the second group stage match.

=== Senior ===
In 2015 Gutiérrez was placed in the Mexico senior national team's provisional list for the 2015 CONCACAF Gold Cup but did not make the final 23-man squad.

He was named in Mexico's squad for a friendly against Senegal in February 2016. He would eventually make his debut with the senior national team on 11 October 2016, in a 1–0 friendly victory against Panama.

On 28 June 2017, Gutiérrez was called up to participate in the 2017 CONCACAF Gold Cup, managing to appear in all group stage games including the semi-final where Mexico lost 1–0 against Jamaica.

In May 2018, Gutiérrez was named in Mexico's preliminary squad for the 2018 FIFA World Cup. He originally did not make the final 23, but due to an injury to Diego Reyes, he was selected as a replacement.

He was included in Gerardo Martino's preliminary roster for the 2019 CONCACAF Gold Cup and was subsequently included in the final roster for the tournament. He would only appear in the second group stage match against Canada, where as a starter he would pick up a hamstring injury leaving him two weeks out. Mexico would go on to win the tournament, defeating rivals the United States. In a September friendly against the United States, he would score his first international goal, winning the match 3–0.

In October 2022, Gutiérrez was named in Mexico's preliminary 31-man squad for the 2022 FIFA World Cup, and in November, he was ultimately included in the final 26-man roster.

== Style of play ==
Gutiérrez is a left-footed box-to-box midfielder who can also play as a deep-lying playmaker and the holding role. He started off his career as a defensive midfielder until manager Diego Alonso opted to play him in a more advanced position. He has captained the Mexico U-20 team as well as his former club, Pachuca.

Gutiérrez has been compared to compatriot Andrés Guardado.

== Career statistics ==
=== Club ===
As of 29 June 2026

Appearances and goals by club, season and competition
Club	Season	League			Cup (Note: Includes Copa MX, KNVB Cup)		Continental		Other		Total	
Club	Season	Division	Apps	Goals	Apps	Goals	Apps	Goals	Apps	Goals	Apps	Goals
Pachuca	2013–14	Liga MX	11	0	7	0	—		—		18	0
Pachuca	2014–15	Liga MX	34	6	—		6 (Note: Appearances in CONCACAF Champions Cup)	3	—		40	9
Pachuca	2015–16	Liga MX	34	3	7	0	—		—		41	3
Pachuca	2016–17	Liga MX	29	1	—		8	2	1 (Note: Appearance in Campeón de Campeones)	0	38	3
Pachuca	2017–18	Liga MX	30	5	3	1	—		—		33	6
Pachuca	2018–19	Liga MX	6	2	2	0	—		—		8	2
Pachuca	Total		144	17	19	1	14	5	1	0	178	23
PSV	2018–19	Eredivisie	16	3	2	1	4 (Note: Appearances in UEFA Champions League)	0	—		22	4
PSV	2019–20	Eredivisie	15	1	—		10 (Note: Two appearances in UEFA Champions League, eight appearances in UEFA Europa League)	0	1 (Note: Appearances in Johan Cruyff Shield)	0	26	1
PSV	2020–21	Eredivisie	8	0	1	0	1 (Note: Appearance in UEFA Europa League)	0	—		10	0
PSV	2021–22	Eredivisie	25	1	5	1	9 (Note: Four appearances in UEFA Europa League, five appearances in UEFA Europa Conference League)	0	—		39	2
PSV	2022–23	Eredivisie	30	2	4	1	9 (Note: Four appearances and one goal in UEFA Champions League qualifying round, five appearances and one goal in UEFA Europa League)	2	1	0	44	5
PSV	Total		94	7	12	3	33	2	2	0	141	12
Guadalajara	2023–24	Liga MX	34	3	—		3	1	2 (Note: Appearances in Leagues Cup)	0	39	4
Guadalajara	2024–25	Liga MX	30	1	—		3	0	2	0	35	1
Guadalajara	2025–26	Liga MX	13	0	—		—		1	0	14	0
Guadalajara	Total		77	4	—		6	1	5	0	88	5
Career total			315	28	31	4	53	8	8	0	407	40

=== International ===
As of match played 23 March 2023

Appearances and goals by national team and year
National team	Year	Apps	Goals
Mexico	2016	1	0
Mexico	2017	7	0
Mexico	2018	5	0
Mexico	2019	6	1
Mexico	2021	9	0
Mexico	2022	7	0
Mexico	2023	1	0
Total		36	1

Scores and results list Mexico Olympic team goal tally first, score column indicates score after each Gutiérrez goal.

List of international goals scored by Érick Gutiérrez
No.	Date	Venue	Opponent	Score	Result	Competition
1	7 August 2016	Itaipava Arena Fonte Nova, Salvador, Brazil	Fiji	1–1	5–1	2016 Summer Olympics
2	7 August 2016	Itaipava Arena Fonte Nova, Salvador, Brazil	Fiji	2–1	5–1	2016 Summer Olympics
3	7 August 2016	Itaipava Arena Fonte Nova, Salvador, Brazil	Fiji	3–1	5–1	2016 Summer Olympics
4	7 August 2016	Itaipava Arena Fonte Nova, Salvador, Brazil	Fiji	5–1	5–1	2016 Summer Olympics

Scores and results list Mexico's goal tally first, score column indicates score after each Gutiérrez goal.

List of international goals scored by Érick Gutiérrez
No.	Date	Venue	Opponent	Score	Result	Competition
1	6 September 2019	MetLife Stadium, East Rutherford, United States	United States	2–0	3–0	Friendly

== Honours ==
Pachuca

- Liga MX: Clausura 2016
- CONCACAF Champions League: 2016–17

PSV

- KNVB Cup: 2021–22, 2022–23
- Johan Cruyff Shield: 2022

Toluca

- Leagues Cup: 2026

Mexico Youth

- CONCACAF U-20 Championship: 2015
- CONCACAF Olympic Qualifying Championship: 2015

Mexico

- CONCACAF Gold Cup: 2019

Individual

- CONCACAF U-20 Championship Best XI: 2015
- Liga MX Best XI: Clausura 2016
