= Donyell Malen =

Dutch footballer (born 1999)

- Malen with Borussia Dortmund in 2023

Personal information
- Full name: Donyell Malen
- Date of birth: 19 January 1999 (age 27)
- Place of birth: Wieringen, Netherlands
- Height: 1.76 m (5 ft 9 in)
- Positions: Centre-forward; winger

Team information
- Current team: Roma
- Number: 14

Youth career
- 2007–2015: Ajax
- 2015–2017: Arsenal

Senior career*
Years	Team	Apps	(Gls)
2017–2018	Jong PSV	22	(13)
2018–2021	PSV	81	(40)
2021–2025	Borussia Dortmund	94	(30)
2025–2026	Aston Villa	35	(7)
2026	→ Roma (loan)	18	(14)
2026–	Roma	11	(12)

International career^{‡}
2014	Netherlands U15	5	(1)
2014–2015	Netherlands U16	6	(3)
2015–2016	Netherlands U17	10	(5)
2016–2017	Netherlands U18	8	(4)
2017–2018	Netherlands U19	10	(10)
2018–2019	Netherlands U21	8	(4)
2019–	Netherlands	58	(14)
Medal record
Men's football
Representing Netherlands
UEFA European Championship
Bronze medal – third place	2024 Germany	Team
- * Club domestic league appearances and goals as of 21:24, 21 November 2026 (UTC) ‡ National team caps and goals as of 16 November 2026

Donyell Malen (born 19 January 1999) is a Dutch professional footballer who plays as a centre-forward or winger for Serie A club Roma and the Netherlands national team.

Malen played youth football for Ajax and Arsenal before joining PSV Eindhoven in 2017, playing for their youth side Jong PSV before graduating to the senior team. He joined German club Borussia Dortmund in 2021, spending four years there before joining Premier League club Aston Villa in 2025. After a six-month loan spell at Roma, he permanently signed for the club in the summer of 2026.

Malen has played at every youth international level for the Netherlands from under-15, before making his senior debut in 2019. He was part of the Netherland's squads at Euro 2020 and 2024, and the 2026 World Cup.

== Club career ==
=== Early career ===
Malen began his career with Ajax in 2007. Despite a great deal of resistance coming from Ajax, in 2015 he left Ajax to join English club Arsenal, due to his heroes Thierry Henry and Dennis Bergkamp.

=== Arsenal ===
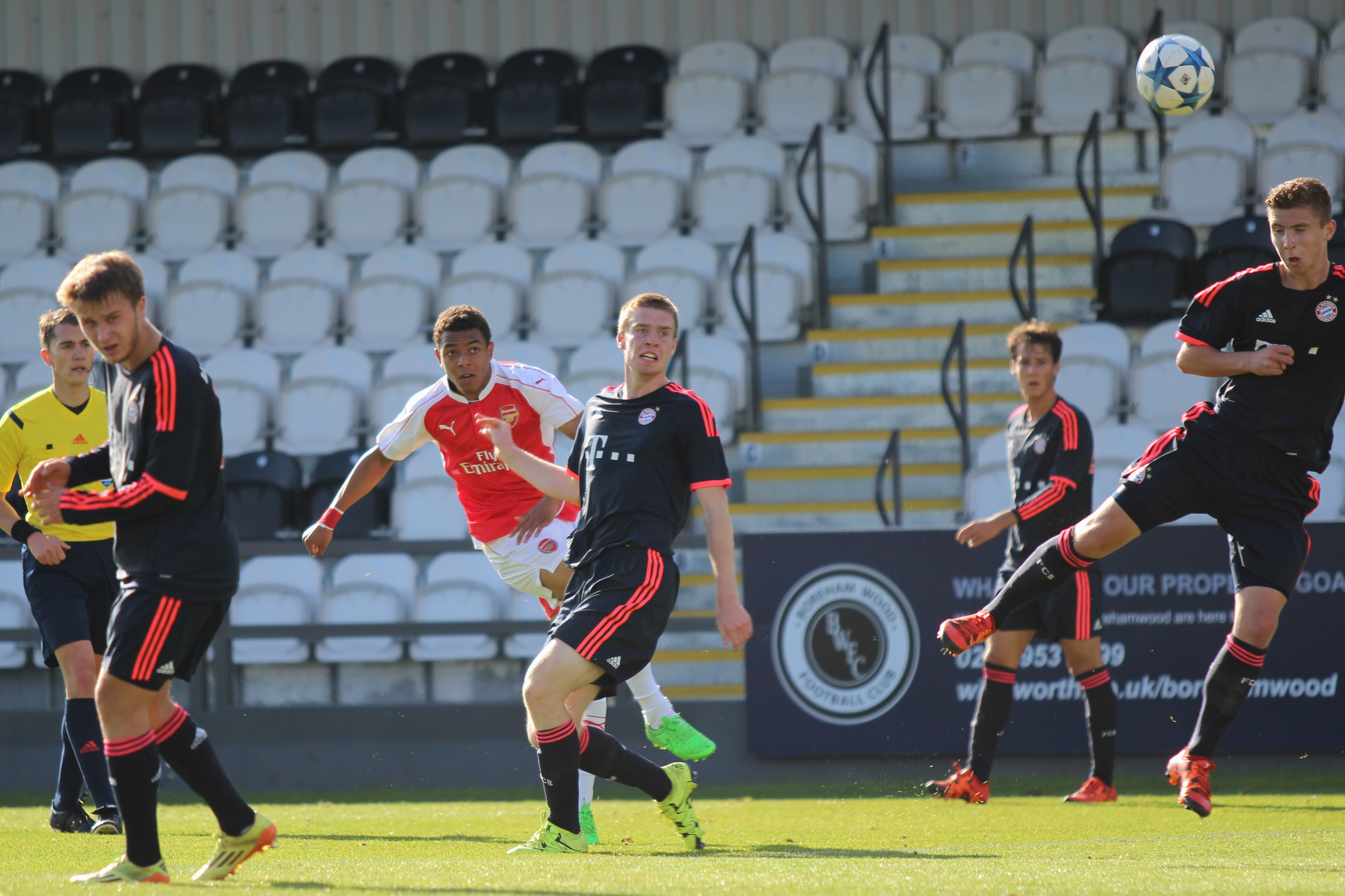
Malen (red shirt) while featuring for Arsenal

Malen began playing for the youth teams of Arsenal in the Youth Premier League together with the FA Youth Cup, and the UEFA Youth League in the 2015–16 season. He began to display his impressive talent during his debut season for the Gunners. He scored in the FA Youth Cup quarter-final away to Coventry City which Arsenal won on penalties. Coming off the bench, he scored against Manchester City in the semi-final of the 2016 FA Youth Cup at the Emirates Stadium. and played 30 times during the season, scoring 14 goals. During the 2016–17 season, Malen was used a great deal on the wing, and was included in the club's 2017–18 pre-season tour of Australia and China. He made his senior debut for Arsenal in a 2–0 win over Sydney on 13 July.

=== PSV Eindhoven ===
Malen was sold by Arsenal to PSV Eindhoven in late August 2017.

Malen went on to play as a winger for Jong PSV. On 24 November Malen scored a brace in Jong PSV's 6–0 win over Telstar. He scored again in PSV II's 3–0 win over FC Oss on 27 November. Malen scored and picked up an assist in PSV II's 2–3 loss to Fortuna upon 4 December.

He again scored in a 1–1 draw away to Go Ahead Eagles on 12 December. Malen went on to be named in Voetbal International's Jupiler League team of the week a day later.

Malen was awarded the Bronze Bull for being the Best Talent for the second period of the 2017–18 Jupiler League on 29 January 2018. He went to make his debut for PSV in a 4–0 Eredivisie win over PEC Zwolle on 3 February. Malen went on to win the 2018 Eredivisie title with PSV. He also ended the 2017–18 season as Jong PSV's topscorer.

On 14 September 2019, Malen scored all five goals for PSV as they thrashed Vitesse. On 29 October 2020, he scored a brace in a 2–1 away win over Omonia in the 2020–21 UEFA Europa League. Malen had his most productive campaign for PSV during the 2020–21 season, scoring 19 goals in 32 matches as his club finished second in the Eredivisie. He added a further eight goals across Europa League and KNVB Cup competition and he also registered ten assists, displaying his characteristics as a multi-faceted forward.

=== Borussia Dortmund ===
On 27 July 2021, Malen completed a move to Bundesliga club Borussia Dortmund, signing a five-year deal. On 28 September 2021, he scored his first Champions League goal in a 1–0 victory over Sporting CP. In the 2022–23 season, he scored nine league goals, finishing as his club's joint top scorer alongside Julian Brandt and Sébastien Haller.

On 20 February 2024, he became the first Dutch footballer to score against a team from his country in the Champions League, since Arjen Robben in 2016, after doing so in a 1–1 draw against his former club PSV. In the 2023–24 season, he set his personal best record in Bundesliga, becoming his club's top scorer in the league with 13 goals. In the same season, he featured in the Champions League final as a substitute, where his club lost 2–0 to Real Madrid.

=== Aston Villa ===
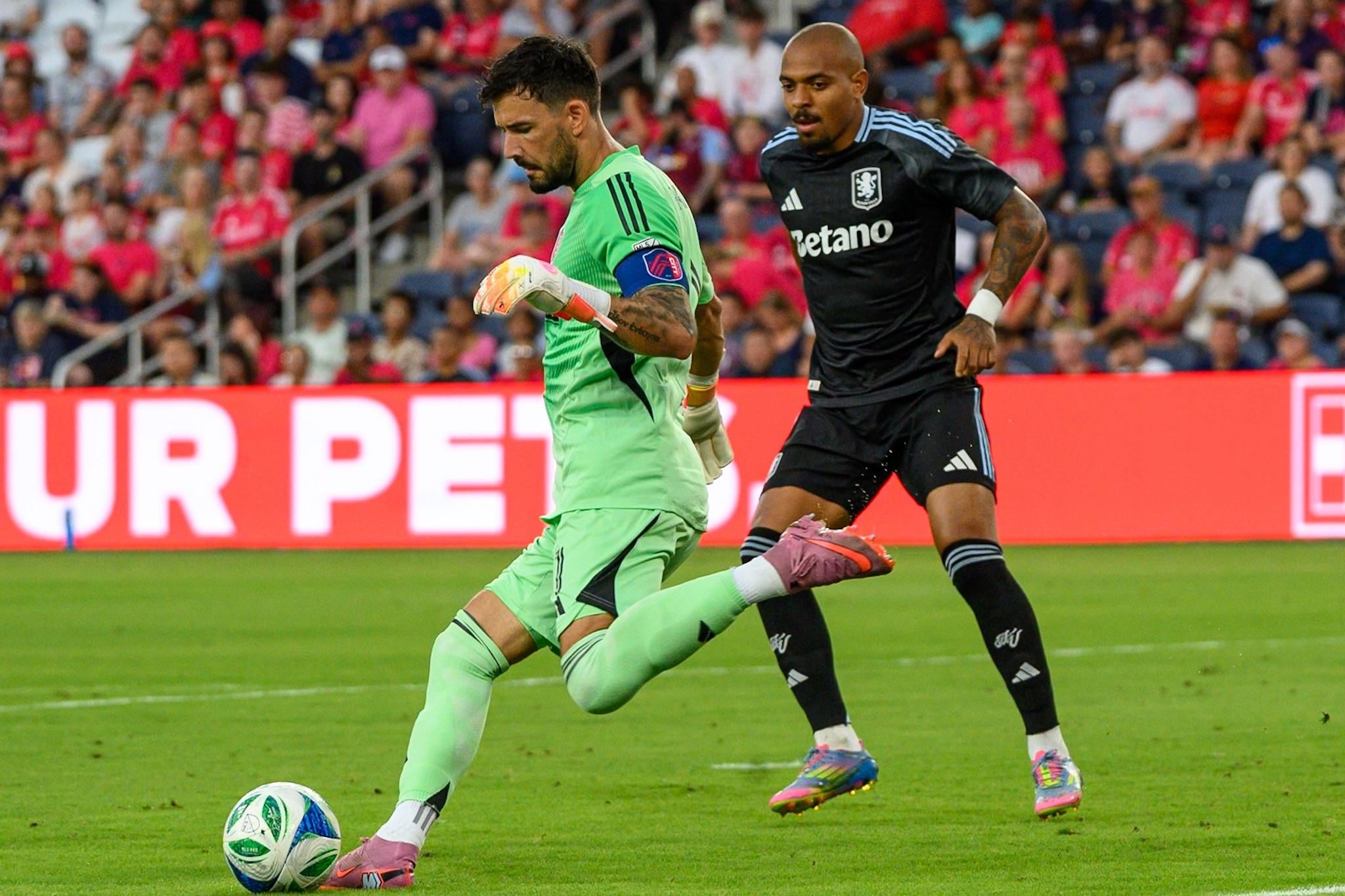
Malen (right) playing for Aston Villa in 2025

On 13 January 2025, Malen signed for Premier League club Aston Villa for an undisclosed fee, reported to be £21m plus addons. He made his debut for Villa on 26 January 2025 as a 65th-minute substitute for Leon Bailey against West Ham. While Malen had spoken of his excitement to play for the team during their Champions League campaign shortly after his signing, he was not registered in Villa's 25-man squad for the competition.

On 2 April 2025, Malen scored his first Premier League goal in the 100th minute of a 3–0 away victory against Brighton & Hove Albion.

After scoring four goals and registering one assist in November 2025, fans voted Malen as Aston Villa's Player of the Month.

=== Roma ===
On 16 January 2026, Malen signed for Roma in an undisclosed deal. It was reported that to be a loan with a fee of around €2m, with an obligation to buy for €25m at the end of the season. Malen made his Roma debut on 18 January 2026 in an away game against Torino, where he also scored his first goal for the club. He scored his first brace for the club against Cagliari on 9 February 2026, and repeated the feat six days later against Napoli. On 10 April 2026, he scored a hat-trick against Pisa, becoming the first (and only) player to do so in the entire Serie A season.

In May 2026, Roma made Malen's transfer permanent after securing qualification for European competition, activating the €25m obligation-to-buy clause in the deal agreed with Aston Villa. By then, Malen had established himself as Roma's leading scorer in Serie A, netting 13 league goals during the second half of the 2025–26 campaign. He concluded the season with 14 goals, scoring his final goal in a 2–0 away victory over Hellas Verona, securing his club's place in the UEFA Champions League for the first time in seven years. On 25 May, Roma announced that Malen had signed a permanent deal running until 30 June 2030.

== International career ==
=== Youth ===
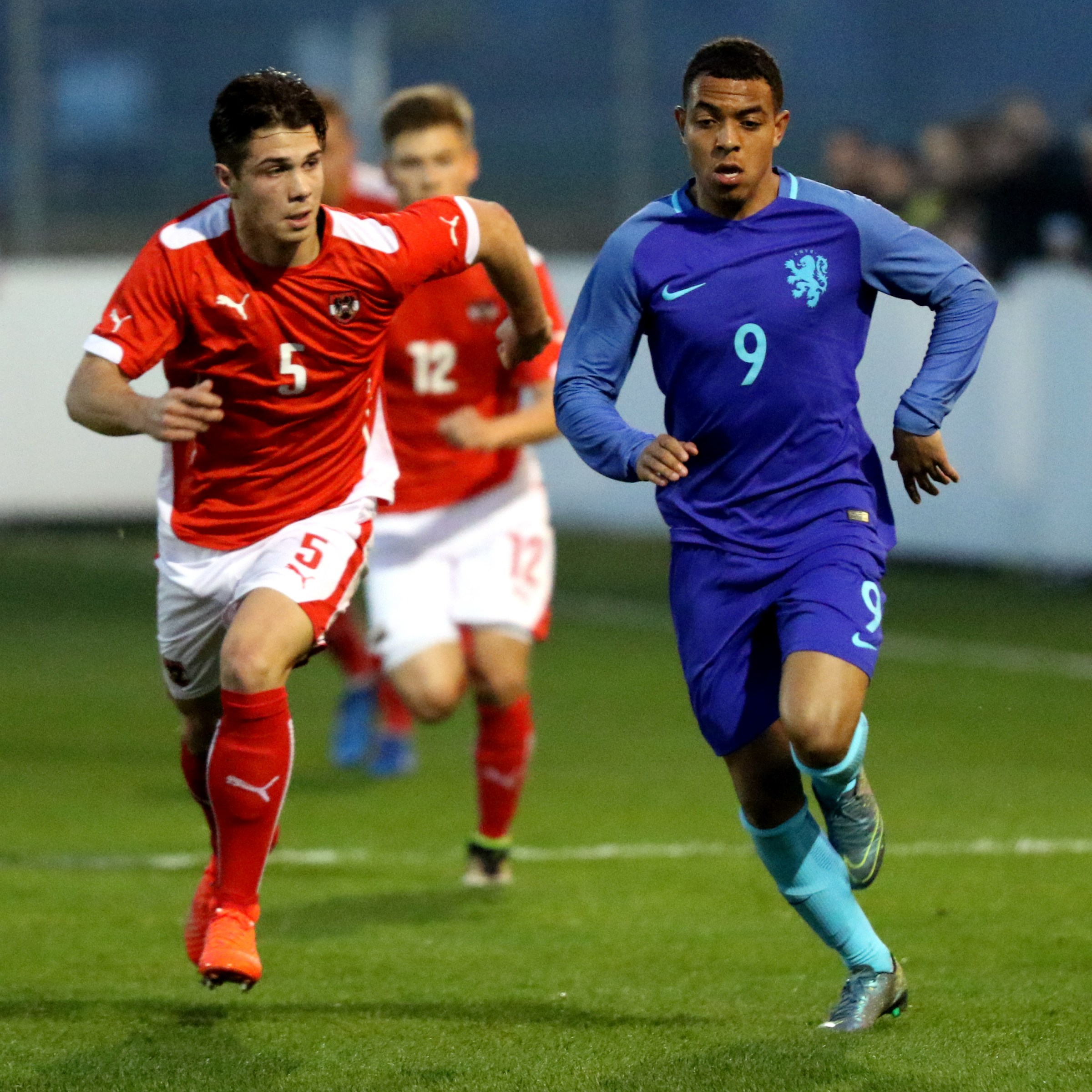
Malen (right) playing for Netherlands' under-18 team in 2017

Born in the Netherlands, Malen is of Surinamese descent through his father. He has represented the Netherlands at every age group from under-15 to senior level. He was a member of the Netherlands under-17 team that reached the semi-finals of the 2016 UEFA European Under-17 Championship held in Azerbaijan.

=== Senior ===
The 20-year-old Malen made his senior international debut for the Netherlands on 6 September 2019, in a UEFA Euro 2020 qualifier against Germany in Hamburg. He came off the bench in the 58th minute and scored his team's third goal in a 4–2 victory.

Malen was a member of the Netherlands squad for UEFA Euro 2020 and made his first tournament appearance as an 89th-minute substitute in their Group B opener against Ukraine on 13 June 2021. He made another appearance from the bench in the second match, assisting Denzel Dumfries' second goal as the Dutch beat Austria to ensure their progress to the knockout rounds. He was selected to start in the team's final group match against North Macedonia and assisted Memphis Depay's opening goal of the 3–0 win. Malen retained his place in the starting line-up for the round of 16 match with Czechia but was substituted after 57 minutes as the Netherlands were beaten 2–0 and eliminated from the tournament.

Malen scored three goals during 2022 FIFA World Cup qualification but was omitted from the 26-man squad for the tournament finals in Qatar.

In June 2023, Malen was part of the Netherlands' squad for the 2023 UEFA Nations League Finals. He scored the opening goal of an eventual 4–2 loss to Croatia in the semi-final and also started the third place play-off loss to Italy, where he was substituted at half time for Steven Bergwijn.

On 29 May 2024, Malen was named in the Netherlands' squad for UEFA Euro 2024. In the round of 16 match against Romania, he scored a brace in a 3–0 victory, securing his country's qualification to the quarter-finals.

On 27 May 2026, Malen was named in the Netherlands' squad for the 2026 FIFA World Cup.

== Style of play ==
A quick player, Malen is a capable dribbler who has been noted for his pace and finishing, particularly with his first touch, but criticised for his low pass numbers; writing for The Athletic in 2025, Jacob Tanswell identified Malen as "not a traditional [number] 9, [number 10] or winger", instead more as a second striker.

He has been likened by ex-Ajax youth coach Brian Tevreden to Chilean forward Alexis Sánchez.

== Personal life ==
Malen is a Christian. Born in Wieringen, Hollands Kroon, Malen is of Surinamese descent through his father. His mother separated from his father at a young age and he was later raised by his mother and grandparents. His mother remarried when he was seven, and he then lived with his new step-father alongside his four new half-brothers and sisters. Malen recognised his grandmother as the person who most encouraged him to become a footballer, teaching him how to kick a ball when he was three years old. Nicknamed "Don" by his friends and family, right after his first goal with Roma he has been renamed 'Bobby Malen' by fans, because of his surname's loose assonance to Bob Marley's. The player has shown appreciation for his new nickname, and the club used it in the video announcing the signing of his permanent deal. Malen was a childhood friend of future Netherlands teammate Matthijs de Ligt.

== Career statistics ==
=== Club ===
As of match played 21 November 2026

Appearances and goals by club, season and competition
Club	Season	League			National cup (Note: Includes KNVB Cup, DFB-Pokal, FA Cup)		League cup (Note: Includes EFL Cup)		Europe		Other		Total	
Club	Season	Division	Apps	Goals	Apps	Goals	Apps	Goals	Apps	Goals	Apps	Goals	Apps	Goals
Jong PSV	2017–18	Eerste Divisie	22	13	—		—		—		—		22	13
PSV Eindhoven	2017–18	Eredivisie	4	0	0	0	—		0	0	—		4	0
PSV Eindhoven	2018–19	Eredivisie	31	10	2	0	—		8 (Note: Appearances in UEFA Champions League)	1	1 (Note: Appearance in Johan Cruyff Shield)	0	42	11
PSV Eindhoven	2019–20	Eredivisie	14	11	0	0	—		10 (Note: Two appearances and one goal in UEFA Champions League, eight appearances and five goals in UEFA Europa League)	6	1	0	25	17
PSV Eindhoven	2020–21	Eredivisie	32	19	3	1	—		10 (Note: Appearances in UEFA Europa League)	7	—		45	27
PSV Eindhoven	Total		81	40	5	1	—		28	14	2	0	116	55
Borussia Dortmund	2021–22	Bundesliga	27	5	2	0	—		8 (Note: Six appearances and three goals in UEFA Champions League, two appearances and one goal in UEFA Europa League)	4	1 (Note: Appearance in DFL-Supercup)	0	38	9
Borussia Dortmund	2022–23	Bundesliga	26	9	3	1	—		6	0	—		35	10
Borussia Dortmund	2023–24	Bundesliga	27	13	3	1	—		8	1	—		38	15
Borussia Dortmund	2024–25	Bundesliga	14	3	2	0	—		5	2	—		21	5
Borussia Dortmund	Total		94	30	10	2	—		27	7	1	0	132	39
Aston Villa	2024–25	Premier League	14	3	3	0	—		0	0	—		17	3
Aston Villa	2025–26	Premier League	21	4	1	0	1	0	6	3	—		29	7
Aston Villa	Total		35	7	4	0	1	0	6	3	—		46	10
Roma (loan)	2025–26	Serie A	18	14	—		—		2	1	—		20	15
Roma	2026–27	Serie A	11	12	0	0	—		4	4	—		15	16
Roma	Roma total		29	26	0	0	—		6	5	—		35	31
Career total			261	116	19	3	1	0	67	29	3	0	351	148

=== International ===
As of match played 16 November 2026

Appearances and goals by national team and year
National team	Year	Apps	Goals
Netherlands	2019	4	1
Netherlands	2020	2	0
Netherlands	2021	11	3
Netherlands	2022	2	0
Netherlands	2023	9	1
Netherlands	2024	13	4
Netherlands	2025	8	4
Netherlands	2026	9	1
Total		58	14

Scores and results list the Netherlands' goal tally first, score column indicates score after each Malen goal.

List of international goals scored by Donyell Malen
No.	Date	Venue	Cap	Opponent	Score	Result	Competition
1	6 September 2019	Volksparkstadion, Hamburg, Germany	1	Germany	3–2	4–2	UEFA Euro 2020 qualifying
2	30 March 2021	Victoria Stadium, Gibraltar	8	Gibraltar	5–0	7–0	2022 FIFA World Cup qualification
3	7 September 2021	Johan Cruyff Arena, Amsterdam, Netherlands	15	Turkey	6–0	6–1	2022 FIFA World Cup qualification
4	11 October 2021	De Kuip, Rotterdam, Netherlands	16	Gibraltar	6–0	6–0	2022 FIFA World Cup qualification
5	14 June 2023	De Kuip, Rotterdam, Netherlands	22	Croatia	1–0	2–4 (a.e.t.)	2023 UEFA Nations League Finals
6	22 March 2024	Johan Cruyff Arena, Amsterdam, Netherlands	29	Scotland	4–0	4–0	Friendly
7	10 June 2024	De Kuip, Rotterdam, Netherlands	32	Iceland	3–0	4–0	Friendly
8	2 July 2024	Allianz Arena, Munich, Germany	35	Romania	2–0	3–0	UEFA Euro 2024
9	2 July 2024	Allianz Arena, Munich, Germany	35	Romania	3–0	3–0	UEFA Euro 2024
10	10 June 2025	Euroborg, Groningen, Netherlands	43	Malta	5–0	8–0	2026 FIFA World Cup qualification
11	10 June 2025	Euroborg, Groningen, Netherlands	43	Malta	7–0	8–0	2026 FIFA World Cup qualification
12	12 October 2025	Johan Cruyff Arena, Amsterdam, Netherlands	47	Finland	1–0	4–0	2026 FIFA World Cup qualification
13	17 November 2025	Johan Cruyff Arena, Amsterdam, Netherlands	49	Lithuania	4–0	4–0	2026 FIFA World Cup qualification
14	13 November 2026	Johan Cruyff Arena, Amsterdam, Netherlands	57	Greece	7–0	7–0	2026–27 UEFA Nations League A

== Honours ==
PSV Eindhoven

- Eredivisie: 2017–18

Borussia Dortmund

- UEFA Champions League runner-up: 2023–24

Aston Villa

- UEFA Europa League: 2025–26

Individual

- Bronze Bull: 2017–18 Jupiler League
- Eredivisie Player of the Month: September 2019, February 2021
- Bundesliga Player of the Month: April 2023
- Serie A Player of the Month: February 2026, August-September 2026
- Serie A Team of the Year: 2025–26
