= The Price of Heaven =

- Film poster
- Dutch: De Prijs van de Hemel
- Directed by: Jack Janssen
- Produced by: Harmen Jalvingh
- Starring: Pablo Rosario
- Cinematography: Hans Bouma, Gregor Meerman
- Edited by: Jack Janssen
- Distributed by: Human
- Release date: 14 May 2012
- Running time: 61 minutes
- Country: Netherlands
- Language: Dutch

The Price of Heaven (Dutch: De Prijs van de Hemel) is a 2012 documentary film produced and directed by independent Dutch filmmaker Jack Janssen.

The film premiered 14 May 2012 at the Rialto Theater in De Pijp, Amsterdam. The film is entirely spoken in Dutch, but subtitles are shown.

== Synopsis ==
The film follows 13-year-old football starlet Pablo Rosario around for a year, Pablo is thirteen and follows a general secondary education, while playing for local football club DWS, the same club that produced the likes of Frank Rijkaard and Ruud Gullit, Dutch international football stars who both found their start in the youth ranks of this same club. Just like many football playing boys his age, Pablo dreams of one day playing for FC Barcelona. His coach is convinced of the young boys talent and foresees a great future for him. Filmmaker Jack Janssen follows Pablo for a whole year, a year where all three of the Dutch big three Ajax, PSV and Feyenoord express an interest in contracting the young child. Janssen shows Pablo's performance on the pitch, where he is able to effortlessly dissect his opponents, with his family watching, where his father showers him with well-intended, but oftentimes inconsistent advice. At school things are running less smoothly for young Pablo, while the film offers insight into the world of a young professional footballer, where a continuous and often even tougher battle for young talents is fought by the top clubs.
