= 2019–20 PSV Eindhoven season =

PSV Eindhoven
2019–20 season
- Chairman: Jan Albers
- Head coach: Mark van Bommel (until 16 December); Ernest Faber (from 16 December until 28 April); Roger Schmidt (from 28 April)
- Stadium: Philips Stadion
- Eredivisie: 4th
- KNVB Cup: Round of 16
- UEFA Champions League: Second qualifying round
- UEFA Europa League: Group stage
- Johan Cruyff Shield: Runners-up
- Top goalscorer: League: Donyell Malen (11); All: Donyell Malen (17)
Home colours	Away colours	Third colours

During the 2019–20 season, PSV participated in the Eredivisie, the KNVB Cup, the UEFA Champions League, the UEFA Europa League and the Johan Cruyff Shield.

== Players ==
=== Squad information ===
As of 31 January 2019

For recent transfers, see List of Dutch football transfers summer 2019 and List of Dutch football transfers winter 2019–20

Note: Flags indicate national team as defined under FIFA eligibility rules; some limited exceptions apply. Players may hold more than one non-FIFA nationality.

No.	Pos.	Nation	Player
4	DF	NED	Nick Viergever
5	DF	GER	Timo Baumgartl
6	DF	GER	Daniel Schwaab
7	FW	POR	Bruma
8	MF	NED	Jorrit Hendrix
9	FW	NED	Donyell Malen
11	FW	GRE	Kostas Mitroglou (on loan from Marseille)
13	GK	GER	Lars Unnerstall
14	FW	NED	Sam Lammers
15	MF	MEX	Érick Gutiérrez
17	MF	NED	Ibrahim Afellay (captain)
18	MF	NED	Pablo Rosario

No.	Pos.	Nation	Player
19	FW	NED	Cody Gakpo
21	GK	NED	Robbin Ruiter
22	DF	NED	Denzel Dumfries (vice-captain)
24	MF	NED	Mohamed Ihattaren
25	FW	JPN	Ritsu Dōan
28	DF	FRA	Olivier Boscagli
30	MF	NZL	Ryan Thomas
31	GK	NED	Yanick van Osch
32	MF	CZE	Michal Sadílek
33	DF	NED	Jordan Teze
68	DF	SUI	Ricardo Rodríguez (on loan from Milan)

== Transfers ==
=== In ===
Ricardo Rodriguez(on loan from Milan)

== Pre-season and friendlies ==
Win Draw Loss

3 July 2019 Friendly	PSV (Netherlands)	0–0	(Switzerland) Sion	Bagnes, Switzerland
19:00 CEST (UTC+2)			Mveng (yellow card) 85'	Stadium: Stade Saint-Marc

7 July 2019 Friendly	PSV (Netherlands)	2–3	(France) Nice	Vevey, Switzerland
17:00 CEST (UTC+2)	Lammers 11'; Piroe 90+2'	Report	Sacko 37'; Saint-Maximin 42'; Coly 62'	Stadium: Stade de Copet; Attendance: 1,200

12 July 2019 Friendly	PSV (Netherlands)	3–0	(Greece) Aris	Oosterhout, Netherlands
19:15 CEST (UTC+2)	Malen 39', 47'; Piroe 85'		Vélez (yellow card) 11'	Stadium: Sportpark De Warande

17 July 2019 Friendly	PSV (Netherlands)	0–2	(Germany) VfL Wolfsburg	Eindhoven, Netherlands
19:05 CEST (UTC+2)			Arnold 5'; William 40'; Guilavogui (yellow card) 42'; Edwards (yellow card) 64' (yellow-red card) 90'; Schlager (yellow card) 82'	Stadium: Philips Stadion

9 January 2020 Friendly	PSV (Netherlands)	1–2	(Belgium) Club Brugge	Doha, Qatar
17:30 AST (UTC+3)	Teze (yellow card) 47'; Dōan 79'	Report	Vossen 53'; Sobol 73'	Stadium: ASPIRE Academy Pitch 1

11 January 2020 Friendly	Eupen (Belgium)	2–1	(Netherlands) PSV	Doha, Qatar
14:35 AST (UTC+3)	Milićević 24'; Ciampichetti 59'	Report	Bruma 34'; Madueke (yellow card) 81'	Stadium: ASPIRE Dome Hall 1

== Competitions ==
=== Overview ===
Competition	First match	Last match	Starting round	Final position	Record							
Competition	First match	Last match	Starting round	Final position	Pld	W	D	L	GF	GA	GD	Win %
Eredivisie	3 August 2019	24 May 2020	Matchday 1	4th	26	14	7	5	54	28	+26	53.85
KNVB Cup	18 December 2019	23 January 2020	Second round	Round of 16	2	1	0	1	2	3	−1	50.00
Johan Cruyff Shield	27 July 2019		Final	Runners-up	1	0	0	1	0	2	−2	0.00
UEFA Champions League	23 July 2019	30 July 2019	Second qualifying round	Second qualifying round	2	1	0	1	4	4	+0	50.00
UEFA Europa League	8 August 2019	12 December 2019	Third qualifying round	Group stage	10	5	3	2	17	12	+5	50.00
Total					41	21	10	10	77	49	+28	51.22

Last updated: 8 March 2020
Source: Soccerway

=== Eredivisie ===
==== League table ====
Pos	Team	Pld	W	D	L	GF	GA	GD	Pts	Qualification or relegation
2	AZ	25	18	2	5	54	17	+37	56	Qualification for the Champions League second qualifying round
3	Feyenoord	25	14	8	3	50	35	+15	50	Qualification for the Europa League group stage
4	PSV Eindhoven	26	14	7	5	54	28	+26	49	Qualification for the Europa League third qualifying round
5	Willem II	26	13	5	8	37	34	+3	44	Qualification for the Europa League second qualifying round
6	FC Utrecht	25	12	5	8	50	34	+16	41	

Source: eredivisie.nl
Rules for classification: Season in progress: 1) Most points won; 2) Less points lost; 3) Goal difference; 4) Goals scored; 5) Alphabetical order; End of season: 1) Points; 2) Goal difference; 3) Goals scored; 4) Head-to-head points; 5) Head-to-head goal difference; 6) Head-to-head away goals scored; 7) Play-off if relevant for deciding champion, relegation or participating in a European league, otherwise by draw. 8) Penalty shoot-out (only after a play-off)

==== Results summary ====
Overall								Home						Away					
Pld	W	D	L	GF	GA	GD	Pts	W	D	L	GF	GA	GD	W	D	L	GF	GA	GD
26	14	7	5	54	28	+26	49	8	3	1	32	12	+20	6	4	4	22	16	+6

Last updated: 8 March 2020.
Source: Eredivisie

==== Results by round ====
Round	1	2	3	4	5	6	7	8	9	10	11	12	13	14	15	16	17	18	19	20	21	22	23	24	25	26	27	28	29	30	31	32	33	34
Ground	A	H	A	A	H	H	H	A	H	A	H	A	A	H	A	H	A	H	A	H	A	H	A	A	H	A	H	A	H	H	A	H	A	H
Result	D	W	W	W	W	D	W	W	W	L	L	D	L	W	D	W	L	W	D	D	L	W	W	W	D	W	C	C	C	C	C	C	C	C
Position	12	7	6	3	2	2	2	2	2	2	3	3	3	3	3	3	4	3	4	5	5	5	4	4	4	4	4	4	4	4	4	4	4	4

Updated to match(es) played on 8 March 2020. Source: Eredivisie
A = Away; H = Home; W = Win; D = Draw; L = Loss; C = Cancelled

==== Matches ====
The Eredivisie schedule was announced on 14 June 2019. The 2019–20 season was abandoned on 24 April 2020, due to the coronavirus pandemic in the Netherlands.

3 August 2019 1	Twente	1–1	PSV	Enschede
20:45 CEST (UTC+2)	Nakamura 8'; Pleguezuelo (yellow card) 89'	Report	Dumfries 65', (yellow card) 76'	Stadium: De Grolsch Veste; Attendance: 27,200; Referee: Serdar Gözübüyük

11 August 2019 2	PSV	3–1	ADO Den Haag	Eindhoven
20:00 CEST (UTC+2)	Bruma 44'; Bergwijn (yellow card) 46'; Malen 52'; Gakpo 90+1'	Report	Necid 33'	Stadium: Philips Stadion; Attendance: 32,000; Referee: Danny Makkelie

18 August 2019 3	Heracles Almelo	0–2	PSV	Almelo
20:00 CEST (UTC+2)	Mauro Júnior (yellow card) 57'; Van der Water (yellow card) 73'	Report	Bergwijn 16'; Sadílek (yellow card) 46'; Baumgartl (yellow card) 50'; Ihattaren 58'; Hendrix (yellow card) 66'; Boscagli (yellow card) 75'; Viergever (yellow card) 78'; Gakpo (yellow card) 84'; Dumfries (yellow card) 88'	Stadium: Polman Stadion; Attendance: 10,063; Referee: Jochem Kamphuis

1 September 2019 4	RKC Waalwijk	1–3	PSV	Waalwijk
20:00 CEST (UTC+2)	Drost (yellow card) 34'; Meulensteen 43'; Bakari (yellow card) 75'	Report	Gakpo (yellow card) 29'; Gutiérrez (yellow card) 51'; Quasten 65' (o.g.); Baumgartl 76'; Mitroglou 78'	Stadium: Mandemakers Stadion; Attendance: 7,508; Referee: Kevin Blom

14 September 2019 5	PSV	5–0	Vitesse	Eindhoven
20:45 CEST (UTC+2)	Malen 18', 36', 46', 83', 89'	Report	Bazoer (yellow card) 73'	Stadium: Philips Stadion; Attendance: 33,300; Referee: Pol van Boekel

22 September 2019 6	PSV	1–1	Ajax	Eindhoven
16:45 CEST (UTC+2)	Sadílek (yellow card) 35'; Malen 77'	Report	Blind (yellow card) 14'; Álvarez (yellow card) 55'; Promes 63'	Stadium: Philips Stadion; Attendance: 35,000; Referee: Danny Makkelie

25 September 2019 7	PSV	3–1	Groningen	Eindhoven
18:30 CEST (UTC+2)	Rosario 12'; Dumfries 38'; Bruma 90+2'	Report	Hrustic (yellow card) 29'; Lundqvist 70'; Postema (yellow card) 90+5'	Stadium: Philips Stadion; Attendance: 32,800; Referee: Bas Nijhuis

29 September 2019 8	PEC Zwolle	0–4	PSV	Zwolle
14:30 CEST (UTC+2)	Hamer (yellow card) 27'	Report	Viergever (yellow card) 30'; Rosario 39'; Zoet (yellow card) 67'; Malen 68'; Dōan 72'; Gakpo (yellow card) 86'; Gutiérrez 90+4'	Stadium: MAC³PARK Stadion; Attendance: 13,482; Referee: Dennis Higler

6 October 2019 9	PSV	4–1	VVV-Venlo	Eindhoven
16:45 CEST (UTC+2)	Bergwijn 61'; Dumfries 65'; Malen 70', 86'	Report	Kirschbaum (yellow card) 60'; Pachonik 73'	Stadium: Philips Stadion; Attendance: 33,000; Referee: Allard Lindhout

19 October 2019 10	Utrecht	3–0	PSV	Utrecht
20:45 CEST (UTC+2)	Van de Streek 49'; Maher 82'; Klaiber 90+3'	Report	Viergever (red card) 68'; Dumfries (yellow card) 70'; Hendrix (red card) 74'	Stadium: Stadion Galgenwaard; Attendance: 22,632; Referee: Danny Makkelie

27 October 2019 11	PSV	0–4	AZ	Eindhoven
14:30 CET (UTC+1)	Thomas (red card) 22'	Report	Wijndal (yellow card) 33'; Boadu 45', 46'; Svensson 71'; De Wit 76'	Stadium: Philips Stadion; Attendance: 34,000; Referee: Pol van Boekel

2 November 2019 12	Sparta Rotterdam	2–2	PSV	Rotterdam
19:45 CET (UTC+1)	Ache 28'; Rayhi 58'	Report	Sadílek 56'; Gakpo 90+1'	Stadium: Sparta Stadion Het Kasteel; Attendance: 10,387; Referee: Bas Nijhuis

10 November 2019 13	Willem II	2–1	PSV	Tilburg
14:30 CET (UTC+1)	Nunnely 7', 64'; Heerkens (yellow card) 30'	Report	Gutiérrez (yellow card) 66'; Mitroglou (yellow card) 67'; Pereiro (yellow card) 70', (goal) 85'; Dōan (yellow card) 73'; Viergever (yellow card) 90'	Stadium: Koning Willem II Stadion; Attendance: 14,400; Referee: Björn Kuipers

24 November 2019 14	PSV	2–1	Heerenveen	Eindhoven
14:30 CET (UTC+1)	Bergwijn 17', 36'; Unnerstall (yellow card) 81'	Report	Odgaard 55'; Faik (yellow card) 70'; Drešević (yellow card) 90+2'	Stadium: Philips Stadion; Attendance: 33,800; Referee: Bas Nijhuis

1 December 2019 15	Emmen	1–1	PSV	Emmen
20:00 CET (UTC+1)	Kolar 52'; Chacón (yellow card) 70'; Bijl (red card) 90+3'	Report	Schwaab 15'; Thomas (yellow card) 48'; Gakpo (yellow card) 67'; Bergwijn (yellow card) 70'; Malen (yellow card) 88'	Stadium: De Oude Meerdijk; Attendance: 8,309; Referee: Dennis Higler

7 December 2019 16	PSV	5–0	Fortuna Sittard	Eindhoven
19:45 CET (UTC+1)	Dōan 8'; Malen 26'; Bergwijn 42' (pen.); Ihattaren 52' (pen.); Gakpo 84'	Report	Essers (yellow card) 13'; Angha (yellow card) 52'; Cox (yellow card) 76'; Niňaj (yellow card) 79'	Stadium: Philips Stadion; Attendance: 33,300; Referee: Allard Lindhout

15 December 2019 17	Feyenoord	3–1	PSV	Rotterdam
14:30 CET (UTC+1)	Berghuis 19', 34' (pen.), 64' (pen.); Geertruida (yellow card) 23'; Kökçü (yellow card) 68'; Malacia (yellow card) 74'	Report	Bergwijn (yellow card) 28'; Dumfries (yellow card) 63'; Schwaab (yellow card) 64'; Pereiro 84'	Stadium: De Kuip; Attendance: 47,625; Referee: Bas Nijhuis

21 December 2019 18	PSV	4–1	PEC Zwolle	Eindhoven
19:45 CET (UTC+1)	Hendrix 18'; Ihattaren 26'; Bruma 51'; Viergever (yellow card) 60'; Gakpo 72'	Report	Dekker (yellow card) 8'; Saymak 12'; Van Crooy (yellow card) 43'; Paal (yellow card) 68'; Thy (yellow card) 85'	Stadium: Philips Stadion; Attendance: 33,000; Referee: Jeroen Manschot

19 January 2020 19	VVV-Venlo	1–1	PSV	Venlo
12:15 CET (UTC+1)	Opoku 68'	Report	Dumfries 90+2'	Stadium: De Koel; Attendance: 7,059; Referee: Danny Makkelie

26 January 2020 20	PSV	1–1	Twente	Eindhoven
16:45 CET (UTC+1)	Gakpo (yellow card) 58'; Dumfries 61'; Afellay (yellow card) 64' (yellow-red card) 75'; Hendrix (yellow card) 90+4'	Report	Selahi (yellow card) 30'; Espinosa (yellow card) 63'; Vučkić 87'	Stadium: Philips Stadion; Attendance: 33,600; Referee: Siemen Mulder

2 February 2020 21	Ajax	1–0	PSV	Amsterdam
16:45 CET (UTC+1)	Promes 35'; Tadić (yellow card) 47'	Report	Schwaab (yellow card) 6'	Stadium: Johan Cruyff Arena; Attendance: 53,055; Referee: Björn Kuipers

8 February 2020 22	PSV	3–0	Willem II	Eindhoven
19:45 CET (UTC+1)	Dumfries 32', (yellow card) 58'; Thomas 70'; Ndayishimiye 90+4'	Report	Llonch (yellow card) 64'	Stadium: Philips Stadion; Attendance: 34,700; Referee: Allard Lindhout

15 February 2020 23	ADO Den Haag	0–3	PSV	The Hague
19:45 CET (UTC+1)	Meijers (yellow card) 66'	Report	Lammers 17' (pen.); Thomas 70'; Gakpo 83'	Stadium: Cars Jeans Stadion; Attendance: 13,370; Referee: Pol van Boekel

23 February 2020 24	Vitesse	1–2	PSV	Arnhem
14:30 CET (UTC+1)	Obispo (yellow card) 36'; Matavž 50'	Report	Lammers 59' (pen.); Gakpo 63'	Stadium: GelreDome; Attendance: 15,509; Referee: Danny Makkelie

1 March 2020 25	PSV	1–1	Feyenoord	Eindhoven
14:30 CET (UTC+1)	Gakpo 47', (yellow card) 48'	Report	Botteghin 33'; Malacia (yellow card) 57'; Kökçü (yellow card) 90+3'	Stadium: Philips Stadion; Attendance: 35,000; Referee: Dennis Higler

8 March 2020 26	Groningen	0–1	PSV	Groningen
16:45 CET (UTC+1)	Schreck (yellow card) 39'	Report	Dumfries 16'	Stadium: Hitachi Capital Mobility Stadion; Attendance: 19,116; Referee: Serdar Gözübüyük

14 March 2020 27	PSV	Cancelled	Emmen	Eindhoven
19:45 CET (UTC+1)				Stadium: Philips Stadion
Note: Match was initially scheduled for 14 March, but cancelled due to the COVID-19 pandemic in the Netherlands.

22 March 2020 28	Fortuna Sittard	Cancelled	PSV	Sittard
12:15 CET (UTC+1)				Stadium: Fortuna Sittard Stadion
Note: Match was initially scheduled for 22 March, but cancelled due to the COVID-19 pandemic in the Netherlands.

4 April 2020 29	PSV	Cancelled	Heracles Almelo	Eindhoven
18:30 CEST (UTC+2)				Stadium: Philips Stadion
Note: Match was initially scheduled for 4 April, but cancelled due to the COVID-19 pandemic in the Netherlands.

12 April 2020 30	PSV	Cancelled	Sparta Rotterdam	Eindhoven
12:15 CEST (UTC+2)				Stadium: Philips Stadion
Note: Match was initially scheduled for 12 April, but cancelled due to the COVID-19 pandemic in the Netherlands.

21 April 2020 31	AZ	Cancelled	PSV	Alkmaar
18:30 CEST (UTC+2)				Stadium: AFAS Stadion
Note: Match was initially scheduled for 21 April, but cancelled due to the COVID-19 pandemic in the Netherlands.

25 April 2020 32	PSV	Cancelled	Utrecht	Eindhoven
18:30 CEST (UTC+2)				Stadium: Philips Stadion
Note: Match was initially scheduled for 25 April, but cancelled due to the COVID-19 pandemic in the Netherlands.

3 May 2020 33	Heerenveen	Cancelled	PSV	Heerenveen
14:30 CEST (UTC+2)				Stadium: Abe Lenstra Stadion
Note: Match was initially scheduled for 3 May, but cancelled due to the COVID-19 pandemic in the Netherlands.

10 May 2020 34	PSV	Cancelled	RKC Waalwijk	Eindhoven
14:30 CEST (UTC+2)				Stadium: Philips Stadion
Note: Match was initially scheduled for 10 May, but cancelled due to the COVID-19 pandemic in the Netherlands.

=== KNVB Cup ===
18 December 2019 Second round	GVVV	1–2 (a.e.t.)	PSV	Veenendaal
20:45 CET (UTC+1)	Laghmouchi 84'; Fini (yellow card) 89'	Report	Mitroglou 41'; Ihattaren 117'	Stadium: Sportpark Panhuis; Attendance: 4,800; Referee: Sander van der Eijk

23 January 2020 Round of 16	NAC Breda	2–0	PSV	Breda
20:45 CET (UTC+1)	Boussaid 54', (yellow card) 70'; I. Ilić 73'; Van Anholt (yellow card) 84'	Report	Baumgartl (red card) 59'; Hendrix (yellow card) 85'	Stadium: Rat Verlegh Stadion; Attendance: 12,887; Referee: Serdar Gözübüyük

=== Johan Cruyff Shield ===
27 July 2019 Final	Ajax	2–0	PSV	Amsterdam
18:00 CEST (UTC+2)	Dolberg 1'; Blind 53'; Veltman (yellow card) 63'; Dest (yellow card) 78'	Report	Hendrix (yellow card) 21'; Gakpo (yellow card) 45'; Luckassen (yellow card) 83'	Stadium: Johan Cruyff Arena; Attendance: 51,837; Referee: Dennis Higler

=== UEFA Champions League ===
==== Qualifying rounds ====
===== Second qualifying round =====
23 July 2019 First leg	PSV (Netherlands)	3–2	(Switzerland) Basel	Eindhoven, Netherlands
20:00 CEST (UTC+2)	Bruma 14'; Bergwijn (yellow card) 73'; Sadílek (yellow card) 84'; Lammers 89'; Malen 90+2'	Report	Ajeti 45+1', (yellow card) 88'; Xhaka (yellow card) 63'; Widmer (yellow card) 73'; Alderete 79'	Stadium: Philips Stadion; Attendance: 31,000; Referee: Andris Treimanis (Latvia)

30 July 2019 Second leg	Basel (Switzerland)	2–1 ((a) 4–4 agg.)	(Netherlands) PSV	Basel, Switzerland
20:00 CEST (UTC+2)	Cömert 8'; Van Wolfswinkel (yellow card) 33', (goal) 68'; Xhaka (yellow card) 45'; Alderete (yellow card) 45+4'	Report	Bruma 23'; Sainsbury (yellow card) 44'; Bergwijn (yellow card) 67'; Sadílek (yellow card) 82'	Stadium: St. Jakob-Park; Attendance: 29,216; Referee: Fábio Veríssimo (Portugal)
Note: 4–4 on aggregate. Basel won on away goals.

=== UEFA Europa League ===
==== Qualifying rounds ====
===== Third qualifying round =====
8 August 2019 First leg	Haugesund (Norway)	0–1	(Netherlands) PSV	Haugesund, Norway
19:00 CEST (UTC+2)	Bergqvist (yellow card) 23'	Report	Rosario (yellow card) 17'; Bergwijn 24' (pen.); Malen (yellow card) 35'; Lozano (yellow card) 69'	Stadium: Haugesund Stadion; Attendance: 5,150; Referee: Matej Jug (Slovenia)

15 August 2019 Second leg	PSV (Netherlands)	0–0 (1–0 agg.)	(Norway) Haugesund	Eindhoven, Netherlands
20:30 CEST (UTC+2)	Sadílek (yellow card) 90+2'	Report		Stadium: Philips Stadion; Attendance: 22,759; Referee: Juan Martínez Munuera (Spain)
Note: PSV won 1–0 on aggregate.

==== Play-off round ====
22 August 2019 First leg	PSV (Netherlands)	3–0	(Cyprus) Apollon Limassol	Eindhoven, Netherlands
20:30 CEST (UTC+2)	Ihattaren 47'; Gakpo 56'; Dumfries 61'; Boscagli (yellow card) 67'; Malen (yellow card) 85'	Report	Sachetti (yellow card) 24'	Stadium: Philips Stadion; Attendance: 17,500; Referee: Aleksei Kulbakov (Belarus)

29 August 2019 Second leg	Apollon Limassol (Cyprus)	0–4 (0–7 agg.)	(Netherlands) PSV	Nicosia, Cyprus
20:00 EEST (UTC+3)	Cham. Kyriakou (yellow card) 7'; Yuste (yellow card) 34'	Report	Hendrix (yellow card) 56'; Ihattaren 73'; Mitroglou 76'; Malen 79', 90+4'	Stadium: GSP Stadium; Attendance: 2,004; Referee: Willie Collum (Scotland)
Note: PSV won 7–0 on aggregate.

==== Group stage ====
Pos	Team	Pld	W	D	L	GF	GA	GD	Pts	Qualification	LASK	SPO	PSV	ROS
1	(Austria) LASK	6	4	1	1	11	4	+7	13	Advance to knockout phase	—	3–0	4–1	1–0
2	(Portugal) Sporting CP	6	4	0	2	11	7	+4	12	Advance to knockout phase	2–1	—	4–0	1–0
3	(Netherlands) PSV Eindhoven	6	2	2	2	9	12	−3	8		0–0	3–2	—	1–1
4	(Norway) Rosenborg	6	0	1	5	3	11	−8	1		1–2	0–2	1–4	—

Source: UEFA
Rules for classification: Group stage tiebreakers

19 September 2019 1	PSV (Netherlands)	3–2	(Portugal) Sporting CP	Eindhoven, Netherlands
18:55 CEST (UTC+2)	Malen 19'; Coates 25' (o.g.); Baumgartl 48'	Report	Fernandes 38' (pen.); Mendes 82'	Stadium: Philips Stadion; Attendance: 30,000; Referee: Ivan Kružliak (Slovakia)

3 October 2019 2	Rosenborg (Norway)	1–4	(Netherlands) PSV	Trondheim, Norway
21:00 CEST (UTC+2)	Adegbenro 70'	Report	Rosario 14'; Meling 38' (o.g.); Malen 41', 79'; Sadílek (yellow card) 80'	Stadium: Philips Stadion; Attendance: 10,296; Referee: Halil Umut Meler (Turkey)

24 October 2019 3	PSV (Netherlands)	0–0	(Austria) LASK	Eindhoven, Netherlands
21:00 CEST (UTC+2)		Report		Stadium: Philips Stadion; Attendance: 29,000; Referee: Chris Kavanagh (England)

7 November 2019 4	LASK (Austria)	4–1	(Netherlands) PSV	Linz, Austria
18:55 CET (UTC+1)	Ranftl 56'; Frieser 60'; Klauss 78', 82'	Report	Schwaab 5' (pen.)	Stadium: Linzer Stadion; Attendance: 12,658; Referee: Radu Petrescu (Romania)

28 November 2019 5	Sporting CP (Portugal)	4–0	(Netherlands) PSV	Lisbon, Portugal
21:00 CET (UTC+1)	Phellype 9'; Fernandes 16', 64' (pen.); Mathieu 43'	Report		Stadium: Estádio José Alvalade; Attendance: 30,146; Referee: Orel Grinfeld (Israel)

12 December 2019 6	PSV (Netherlands)	1–1	(Norway) Rosenborg	Eindhoven, Netherlands
18:55 CET (UTC+1)	Ihattaren 63'; Malen (yellow card) 90+5'	Report	Helland 22'; Meling (yellow card) 59'; Reginiussen (yellow card) 80'	Stadium: Philips Stadion; Attendance: 24,000; Referee: Vitali Meshkov (Russia)

== Statistics ==
=== Appearances and goals ===
As of 8 March 2020

No.	Pos	Nat	Player	Total		Eredivisie		KNVB Cup		Johan Cruyff Shield		Champions League		Europa League	
No.	Pos	Nat	Player	Apps	Goals	Apps	Goals	Apps	Goals	Apps	Goals	Apps	Goals	Apps	Goals
Goalkeepers
13	GK	(Germany) GER	Lars Unnerstall	17	0	13	0	2	0	0	0	0	0	2	0
21	GK	(Netherlands) NED	Robbin Ruiter	2	0	1	0	0	0	0	0	0	0	1	0
31	GK	(Netherlands) NED	Yanick van Osch	0	0	0	0	0	0	0	0	0	0	0	0
Defenders
4	DF	(Netherlands) NED	Nick Viergever	37	0	23	0	2	0	0	0	2	0	10	0
5	DF	(Germany) GER	Timo Baumgartl	22	2	12+1	1	1+1	0	0	0	0	0	7	1
6	MF	(Germany) GER	Daniel Schwaab	20	1	17+1	1	2	0	0	0	0	0	0	0
22	DF	(Netherlands) NED	Denzel Dumfries	40	8	25	7	2	0	1	0	2	0	10	1
28	DF	(France) FRA	Olivier Boscagli	18	0	6+6	0	1	0	1	0	0	0	4	0
33	DF	(Netherlands) NED	Jordan Teze	3	0	1+1	0	0	0	0	0	0	0	0+1	0
68	DF	(Switzerland) SUI	Ricardo Rodríguez	6	0	5+1	0	0	0	0	0	0	0	0	0
Midfielders
8	MF	(Netherlands) NED	Jorrit Hendrix	25	1	13+4	1	1	0	1	0	0	0	4+2	0
15	MF	(Mexico) MEX	Érick Gutiérrez	26	1	9+6	1	0	0	0+1	0	2	0	7+1	0
17	MF	(Netherlands) NED	Ibrahim Afellay	4	0	1+2	0	0+1	0	0	0	0	0	0	0
18	MF	(Netherlands) NED	Pablo Rosario	41	3	26	2	2	0	1	0	2	0	9+1	1
24	MF	(Netherlands) NED	Mohamed Ihattaren	33	7	20+2	3	2	1	0	0	0	0	8+1	3
30	MF	(New Zealand) NZL	Ryan Thomas	15	2	10+1	2	1	0	0	0	0	0	1+2	0
32	MF	(Czech Republic) CZE	Michal Sadílek	24	1	13+1	1	0	0	1	0	2	0	6+1	0
Forwards
7	FW	(Portugal) POR	Bruma	31	5	12+6	3	1+1	0	1	0	2	2	6+2	0
9	FW	(Netherlands) NED	Donyell Malen	25	17	14	11	0	0	0+1	0	2	1	7+1	5
11	FW	(Greece) GRE	Kostas Mitroglou	20	3	0+13	1	1	1	0	0	2	0	0+4	1
14	FW	(Netherlands) NED	Sam Lammers	10	3	7	2	0+1	0	1	0	0+1	1	0	0
19	FW	(Netherlands) NED	Cody Gakpo	39	8	14+11	7	1+1	0	1	0	0+2	0	6+3	1
25	FW	(Japan) JPN	Ritsu Dōan	25	2	12+7	2	1+1	0	0	0	0	0	3+1	0
34	FW	(Bosnia and Herzegovina) BIH	Amar Ćatić	2	0	0	0	0	0	0	0	0	0	0+2	0
56	FW	(Netherlands) NED	Steven Bergwijn	4	0	1+3	0	0	0	0	0	0	0	0	0
Players transferred out during the season
1	GK	(Netherlands) NED	Jeroen Zoet	21	0	11	0	0	0	1	0	2	0	7	0
3	DF	(Spain) ESP	Toni Lato	1	0	0	0	0	0	0	0	0	0	0+1	0
20	DF	(Australia) AUS	Trent Sainsbury	1	0	1	0	0	0	0	0	0	0	0	0
23	DF	(Netherlands) NED	Derrick Luckassen	3	0	0	0	0	0	1	0	2	0	0	0
27	MF	(Uruguay) URU	Gastón Pereiro	8	2	1+3	2	1	0	0	0	0	0	1+2	0
10	FW	(Netherlands) NED	Steven Bergwijn	29	6	16	5	1+1	0	1	0	2	0	8	1
26	FW	(Morocco) MAR	Zakaria Aboukhlal	1	0	0+1	0	0	0	0	0	0	0	0	0
11	FW	(Mexico) MEX	Hirving Lozano	5	0	1	0	0	0	0+1	0	2	0	0+1	0
