= 2018–19 PSV Eindhoven season =

PSV
2018–19 season
- General manager: Toon Gerbrands
- Head coach: Mark van Bommel
- Stadium: Philips Stadion
- Eredivisie: 2nd
- KNVB Cup: Second round
- Johan Cruyff Shield: Runners-up
- Champions League: Group stage
- Top goalscorer: League: Luuk de Jong (28); All: Luuk de Jong (32)
Home colours	Away colours	Third colours

During the 2018–19 season, PSV Eindhoven participated in the Eredivisie, the KNVB Cup, the Johan Cruyff Shield and the UEFA Champions League.

== Season summary ==
The season was Mark van Bommel's first season as manager of PSV. He replaced Philip Cocu, who joined Fenerbahçe after five seasons at PSV, during which the club won three national titles.

PSV started the season as defending Eredivisie champions, which qualified them for the Johan Cruyff Shield against cup winners Feyenoord. The match was scoreless after 90 minutes and went straight to a penalty shootout, which Feyenoord won 6–5. In the Eredivisie, PSV finished in second place despite winning their first 13 matches, three points behind Ajax. Although they did not win the league, they did break an Eredivisie record by scoring at least one goal in each of their first 32 matches (out of 34). PSV's campaign in the KNVB Cup was a disappointment, as they were knocked out in the second round by Eerste Divisie side RKC Waalwijk.

PSV qualified for the group stage of the UEFA Champions League by eliminating BATE Borisov in the play-off round. They were drawn into group B against Inter Milan, Barcelona and eventual finalists Tottenham Hotspur. PSV finished their group in fourth and last place, picking up only two points.

== Squad ==
As of 17 January 2019

Note: Flags indicate national team as defined under FIFA eligibility rules; some limited exceptions apply. Players may hold more than one non-FIFA nationality.

No.	Pos.	Nation	Player
1	GK	NED	Jeroen Zoet
3	DF	AUS	Aziz Behich
4	DF	NED	Nick Viergever
5	DF	GER	Daniel Schwaab
6	DF	ESP	Angeliño
7	FW	URU	Gastón Pereiro
8	MF	NED	Jorrit Hendrix
9	FW	NED	Luuk de Jong (captain)
10	FW	ARG	Maximiliano Romero
11	FW	MEX	Hirving Lozano
13	GK	CUW	Eloy Room
14	FW	NED	Donyell Malen
15	DF	NED	Armando Obispo
16	MF	BEL	Dante Rigo

No.	Pos.	Nation	Player
17	FW	NED	Steven Bergwijn
18	MF	NED	Pablo Rosario
19	FW	NED	Cody Gakpo
20	DF	AUS	Trent Sainsbury
22	DF	NED	Denzel Dumfries
23	MF	NED	Bart Ramselaar
25	MF	MEX	Érick Gutiérrez
29	FW	BEL	Matthias Verreth
30	MF	NZL	Ryan Thomas
31	GK	NED	Yanick van Osch
32	MF	CZE	Michal Sadílek
33	DF	NED	Jordan Teze
47	MF	BRA	Mauro Júnior
52	MF	NED	Mohammed Ihattaren

== Friendlies ==
7 July 2018	Anderlecht	5–3	PSV
		Report (in Dutch)

14 July 2018	Neuchâtel Xamax	1–1	PSV
15:00 CEST	Xhemajli 59'	Report	Bergwijn 21'

18 July 2018	Galatasaray	1–3	PSV
19:00 CEST	Linnes 65'	Report	Bergwijn 41'; Malen 59'; Gakpo 78'

24 July 2018	PSV	4–0	Olympiacos
19:00 CEST	De Jong 68', 71'; Schwaab 76'; Malen 79'	Report

28 July 2018	PSV	2–1	Valencia CF
19:00 CEST	De Jong 34'; Pereiro 41' (pen.)	Report	Soler 25'

== Competitions ==
=== Johan Cruyff Shield ===
4 August 2018	PSV	0–0 (5–6 p)	Feyenoord	Philips Stadion, Eindhoven
18:00 CEST	Angeliño (yellow card) 56'	Report	St. Juste (yellow card) 50'; Verdonk (yellow card) 78'	Referee: Serdar Gözübüyük
	Penalties
	Pereiro (penalty scored); Hendrix (penalty missed); Schwaab (penalty scored); De Jong (penalty scored); Lozano (penalty scored); Mauro Júnior (penalty scored); Angeliño (penalty missed); Rosario (penalty missed)		(penalty scored) Van der Heijden; (penalty scored) Berghuis; (penalty scored) Vente; (penalty missed) Larsson; (penalty scored) Vilhena; (penalty scored) Verdonk; (penalty missed) Amrabat; (penalty scored) Clasie

=== Eredivisie ===
==== League table ====
Pos	Team	Pld	W	D	L	GF	GA	GD	Pts	Qualification or relegation
1	Ajax (C)	34	28	2	4	119	32	+87	86	Qualification for the Champions League third qualifying round
2	PSV Eindhoven	34	26	5	3	98	26	+72	83	Qualification for the Champions League second qualifying round
3	Feyenoord	34	20	5	9	75	41	+34	65	Qualification for the Europa League third qualifying round (Note: Since the winners of the 2018–19 KNVB Cup, Ajax, qualified for European competition based on league position, the spot awarded to the KNVB Cup winners (Europa League third qualifying round) was passed to the third-placed team and the spot awarded to the third-placed team (Europa League second qualifying round) was passed to the fourth-placed team.)
4	AZ	34	17	7	10	64	43	+21	58	Qualification for the Europa League second qualifying round
5	Vitesse	34	14	11	9	70	51	+19	53	Qualification for the European competition play-offs (Note: Four teams play for a spot in the 2019–20 UEFA Europa League second qualifying round.)

Source: eredivisie.nl
Rules for classification: Season in progress: 1) Most points won; 2) Less points lost; 3) Goal difference; 4) Goals scored; 5) Alphabetical order; End of season: 1) Points; 2) Goal difference; 3) Goals scored; 4) Head-to-head points; 5) Head-to-head goal difference; 6) Head-to-head away goals scored; 7) Play-off if relevant for deciding champion, relegation or participating in a European league, otherwise by draw. 8) Penalty shoot-out (only after a play-off)
(C) Champions
Notes:

Ten teams, two from the Eredivisie and eight from the Eerste Divisie, played for two spots in the 2019–20 Eredivisie, the remaining eight teams playing in the 2019–20 Eerste Divisie.

First round
NEC	2	0	2
RKC Waalwijk	0	3	3
SC Cambuur	2	2	4
Almere City	2	1	3

Second round
RKC Waalwijk	2	1	3
Excelsior	1	1	2
Go Ahead Eagles	2	1	3
FC Den Bosch	2	0	2
TOP Oss	0	0	0
Sparta Rotterdam	2	3	5
SC Cambuur	1	0	1
De Graafschap	1	2	3

Third round
RKC Waalwijk*	0	5	5
Go Ahead Eagles	0	4	4
Sparta Rotterdam*	1	2	3
De Graafschap	2	0	2

Key: * = Play-off winners, (a) = Wins because of away goals rule, (e) = Wins after extra time in second leg, (p) = Wins after penalty shoot-out.

==== Results summary ====
Overall								Home						Away					
Pld	W	D	L	GF	GA	GD	Pts	W	D	L	GF	GA	GD	W	D	L	GF	GA	GD
34	26	5	3	98	26	+72	83	16	1	0	58	7	+51	10	4	3	40	19	+21

==== Matches ====
11 August 2018 1	PSV	4–0	Utrecht	Eindhoven
20:45	Pereiro 16'; Bergwijn (yellow card) 40', (goal) 57'; Hendrix (yellow card) 45+1'; Lozano 77'; Dumfries 80'	Report	Troupée (yellow card) 26'; Van der Maarel (yellow card) 52'	Stadium: Philips Stadion; Attendance: 32,803; Referee: Bas Nijhuis

18 August 2018 2	Fortuna Sittard	1–2	PSV	Sittard
20:45	Novakovich 61'; Pinto (yellow card) 63'	Report	Rosario (yellow card) 19'; Lozano 33'; Rigo 90'	Stadium: Fortuna Sittard Stadion; Attendance: 11,135; Referee: Pol van Boekel

25 August 2018 3	PEC Zwolle	1–2	PSV	Zwolle
20:45	Ehizibue (yellow card) 40'; Van Crooy 48'	Report	De Jong 41', 90+3'; Dumfries (yellow card) 56'; Viergever (yellow card) 90+1'	Stadium: MAC³PARK Stadion; Attendance: 13,255; Referee: Björn Kuipers

1 September 2018 4	PSV	6–1	Willem II	Eindhoven
19:45	Hendrix 7'; Bergwijn 13', 72'; Pereiro 35' (pen.); Viergever 44', 49'	Report	Sol 46'; Heerkens (yellow card) 48'; Lewis (yellow card) 63'; Palacios (yellow card) 70'; Özbiliz (yellow card) 79'	Stadium: Philips Stadion; Attendance: 33,005; Referee: Jochem Kamphuis

15 September 2018 5	ADO Den Haag	0–7	PSV	The Hague
18:30	Meijers (yellow card) 27'; Beugelsdijk (yellow card) 42'	Report	Lozano 18', 73'; De Jong 45+2'; Pereiro 54' (pen.), 90+5' (pen.); Gutiérrez 75'; Bergwijn 90+2'	Stadium: Cars Jeans Stadion; Attendance: 14,519; Referee: Bas Nijhuis

23 September 2018 6	PSV	3–0	Ajax	Eindhoven
16:45	Pereiro 21', (yellow card) 27'; L. De Jong 24', (yellow card) 62'; Lozano (yellow card) 20', (goal) 35'	Report	Tadić (yellow card) 19'; Ziyech (yellow card) 77'	Stadium: Philips Stadion; Attendance: 34,433; Referee: Danny Makkelie

29 September 2018 7	NAC Breda	0–2	PSV	Breda
18:30	Te Vrede (yellow card) 17'; Nijholt (yellow card) 51'; Rosheuvel (yellow card) 53'	Report	De Jong 47', (yellow card) 51'; Rosario (yellow card) 58'; Lozano (yellow card) 75'; Zoet (yellow card) 90+1'; Malen 90+2'	Stadium: Rat Verlegh Stadion; Attendance: 18,926; Referee: Dennis Higler

6 October 2018 8	PSV	4–0	VVV-Venlo	Eindhoven
19:45	Lozano 34', 90+2'; De Jong 64'; Gutiérrez 87'	Report	Kum (yellow card) 12'; Promes (yellow card) 48'	Stadium: Philips Stadion; Attendance: 33,865; Referee: Siemen Mulder

20 October 2018 9	PSV	6–0	Emmen	Eindhoven
18:30	Pereiro 12', 42', (yellow card) 27'; Hendrix (yellow card) 20'; De Jong 29', 36'; Rosario (yellow card) 52'; Gutiérrez 79'; Lozano 88'	Report	(yellow card) 12' Jansen; (yellow card) 16' Cavlan; (yellow card) 63' Klok	Stadium: Philips Stadion; Attendance: 34,051

27 October 2018 10	Groningen	1–2	PSV	Groningen
19:45	Memišević 42' (pen.); Handwerker (yellow card) 44'; Reis (yellow card) 61'; Pohl (yellow card) 80'	Report	Malen 45+1'; Dumfries 86'	Stadium: Euroborg; Referee: Danny Makkelie

3 November 2018 11	PSV	1–0	Vitesse	Eindhoven
20:45	Bergwijn (yellow card) 42'; De Jong 69'; Dumfries (yellow card) 86'	Report	Doekhi (red card) 14'; Linssen (yellow card) 15'; Ødegaard (yellow card) 62'	Stadium: Philips Stadion; Attendance: 33,882; Referee: Serdar Gözübüyük

10 November 2018 12	De Graafschap	1–4	PSV	Doetinchem
19:45	El Jebli 21'; Nijland (yellow card) 81'	Report	De Jong 18', 87'; Bergwijn 27'; Malen 77'	Stadium: De Vijverberg; Attendance: 12,313; Referee: Kevin Blom

24 November 2018 13	PSV	3–0	Heerenveen	Eindhoven
18:30	Lozano 11', 66'; De Jong 52'	Report	Bulthuis (yellow card) 26'; Thorsby (red card) 37'; Lammers (yellow card) 42'	Stadium: Philips Stadion; Attendance: 33,944; Referee: Pol van Boekel

2 December 2018 14	Feyenoord	2–1	PSV	Rotterdam
14:30	Van Beek (yellow card) 26'; Jørgensen 28'; Larsson 33'; Malacia (yellow card) 68'	Report	Viergever (yellow card) 15'; Rosario (yellow card) 52'; Bergwijn 72'	Stadium: De Kuip; Attendance: 45,000; Referee: Serdar Gözübüyük

8 December 2018 15	PSV	6–0	Excelsior	Eindhoven
18:30	De Jong 17', 90+2'; Van der Meer 34' (o.g.); Mattheij 52' (o.g.); Sainsbury (yellow card) 60'; Malen 80'; Bergwijn 89'	Report	Bruins (yellow card) 54'; Van der Meer (yellow card) 64'; El Hamdaoui (yellow card) 67'	Stadium: Philips Stadion; Attendance: 33,045; Referee: Jeroen Manschot

15 December 2018 16	Heracles Almelo	0–4	PSV	Almelo
19:45	Duarte (yellow card) 23'; Drost (red card) 45+2'; Sama (yellow card) 45+4'; Blaswich (yellow card) 50'; Czyborra (yellow card) 65' (red card) 90+2'	Report	Bergwijn 12'; Schwaab 33'; Rosario (yellow card) 61'; Dumfries 79'; Pereiro 90+4'	Stadium: Polman Stadion; Attendance: 12,080; Referee: Dennis Higler

22 December 2018 17	PSV	3–1	AZ	Eindhoven
19:45	Hendrix (yellow card) 35'; Bergwijn 40', (yellow card) 90+1'; Sadílek 47', (yellow card) 70'; Lozano (yellow card) 66', (goal) 84' (pen.)	Report	Seuntjens 16'; Svensson (yellow card) 26'; Ouwejan (yellow card) 58'; Koopmeiners (yellow card) 62'; Idrissi (yellow card) 64'; Vlaar (yellow card) 76'	Stadium: Philips Stadion; Attendance: 34,259; Referee: Pol van Boekel

20 January 2019 18	Emmen	2–2	PSV	Emmen
14:30	Cavlan (yellow card) 68'; Pedersen 80', 90+2'	Report	De Jong 15'; Gutiérrez (yellow card) 67'; Angeliño 71'; Dumfries (yellow card) 85'; Malen (yellow card) 88'	Stadium: De Oude Meerdijk; Attendance: 8,301; Referee: Jochem Kamphuis

26 January 2019 19	PSV	2–1	Groningen	Eindhoven
19:45	Lozano 15', 19'; Pereiro (yellow card) 77'	Report	Reis 34'; Absalem (yellow card) 55'; Chabot (yellow card) 66'; te Wierik (yellow card) 77'; Bruns (yellow card) 90+4'	Stadium: Philips Stadion; Attendance: 33,818; Referee: Dennis Higler

3 February 2019 20	PSV	5–0	Fortuna Sittard	Eindhoven
14:30	Pereiro 8'; Malen (yellow card) 12'; Angeliño (yellow card) 40'; De Jong 54', 76', 87'; Gakpo 56'	Report	Essers (yellow card) 25' (yellow-red card) 32'; Mica (yellow card) 37'; El Messaoudi (yellow card) 75'	Stadium: Philips Stadion; Attendance: 34,312; Referee: Kevin Blom

10 February 2019 21	Utrecht	2–2	PSV	Utrecht
16:45	Van de Streek 7'; Kerk 38'; Gustafson (yellow card) 59'	Report	De Jong 57', 86'; Bergwijn (yellow card) 90+2'	Stadium: Stadion Galgenwaard; Attendance: 19,005; Referee: Pol van Boekel

16 February 2019 22	Heerenveen	2–2	PSV	Heerenveen
19:45	Van Bergen 3'; Vlap 25', (yellow card) 60'; Pierie (yellow card) 58'	Report	Pereiro 59'; Malen 90+5'	Stadium: Abe Lenstra Stadion; Attendance: 23,522; Referee: Jochem Kamphuis

24 February 2019 23	PSV	1–1	Feyenoord	Eindhoven
14:30	Lozano 72'	Report	Vilhena (yellow card) 47'; Van Beek (yellow card) 57' (red card) 59'; Jørgensen 70'; Van der Heijden (yellow card) 76'; Clasie (yellow card) 89'	Stadium: Philips Stadion; Attendance: 34,578; Referee: Dennis Higler

2 March 2019 24	Excelsior	0–2	PSV	Rotterdam
19:45		Report	Bergwijn 8', 54'; Lozano (yellow card) 24'	Stadium: Van Donge & De Roo Stadion; Referee: Danny Makkelie

9 March 2019 25	PSV	2–0	NAC Breda	Eindhoven
19:45	De Jong 5'; Angeliño (yellow card) 15'; Malen 71', (yellow card) 85'	Report		Stadium: Philips Stadion; Attendance: 34,143; Referee: Serdar Gözübüyük

17 March 2019 26	VVV-Venlo	0–1	PSV	Venlo
12:15		Report	Lozano 86'	Stadium: De Koel; Attendance: 8,000; Referee: Jeroen Manschot

31 March 2019 27	Ajax	3–1	PSV	Amsterdam
16:45	Schwaab 21' (o.g.); Mazraoui (red card) 57'; Tadić (yellow card) 68', (goal) 72' (pen.); Onana (yellow card) 90+2'; Neres 90+6', (yellow card) 90+7'	Report	Sadílek (yellow card) 54'; L. De Jong 58'; Malen (yellow card) 73'	Stadium: Johan Cruyff Arena; Attendance: 52,669; Referee: Björn Kuipers

4 April 2019 28	PSV	4–0	PEC Zwolle	Eindhoven
18:30	De Jong 24', 76'; Bergwijn 62'; Malen 90+4'	Report		Stadium: Philips Stadion; Attendance: 33,984; Referee: Pol van Boekel

7 April 2019 29	Vitesse	3–3	PSV	Arnhem
16:45	Serero 13'; Pasveer (yellow card) 40'; Ødegaard 59'; Karavayev (yellow card) 79'; Matavž 83'; Van der Werff (red card) 89'	Report	Rosario (yellow card) 16'; Lozano 41' (pen.), 90+1' (pen.); Viergever (yellow card) 60'; De Jong 70'; Dumfries (yellow card) 77'	Stadium: GelreDome; Attendance: 21,248; Referee: Serdar Gözübüyük

14 April 2019 30	PSV	2–1	De Graafschap	Eindhoven
12:15	Sadílek (yellow card) 52'; Bergwijn 65' (pen.); De Jong 73', (yellow card) 90+3'	Report	Burgzorg 26'; S. Nieuwpoort (yellow card) 62'	Stadium: Philips Stadion; Attendance: 34,495; Referee: Allard Lindhout

21 April 2019 31	PSV	3–1	ADO Den Haag	Eindhoven
16:45	Dumfries 20'; De Jong 83'; Malen 90+2'	Report	Necid 88'	Stadium: Philips Stadion; Attendance: 34,234; Referee: Danny Makkelie

25 April 2019 32	Willem II	0–3	PSV	Tilburg
20:45	Dankerlui (yellow card) 66'	Report	Malen 31'; De Jong 37'; Bergwijn 65'; Angeliño (yellow card) 68'	Stadium: Koning Willem II Stadion; Attendance: 14,700; Referee: Dennis Higler

12 May 2019 33	AZ	1–0	PSV	Alkmaar
14:30	Til 49' (yellow card) 90'	Report	Schwaab (yellow card) 70'	Stadium: AFAS Stadion; Attendance: 16,555; Referee: Danny Makkelie

15 May 2019 34	PSV	3–1	Heracles Almelo	Eindhoven
19:30	Droste 32' (o.g.); Rosario (yellow card) 43'; Viergever 48'; Malen 89'	Report	Konings 1'; Dalmau (yellow card) 15'	Stadium: Philips Stadion; Attendance: 34,067; Referee: Bas Nijhuis

=== KNVB Cup ===
28 September 2018 1	Excelsior Maassluis	0–4	PSV	Maassluis
18:30	Van Ewijk (yellow card) 66'; Kruithof (yellow card) 76'	Report	Gakpo 15'; Behich (yellow card) 34'; Sainsbury 44'; Sadílek (yellow card) 64'; Lundqvist 69'; Isimat-Mirin 73'	Stadium: Sportpark Dijkpolder; Referee: Jeroen Manschot

30 October 2018 2	PSV	2–3 (a.e.t.)	RKC Waalwijk	Eindhoven
18:30	Gutiérrez 1'; Mauro Júnior 76'; Lozano (yellow card) 120+1'	Report	Van Weert 29'; Vermeulen (yellow card) 70'; Maatsen 90+1', 109'; Tahiri (yellow card) 104'	Stadium: Philips Stadion; Referee: Martin van den Kerkhof

=== UEFA Champions League ===
==== Qualifying rounds ====
21 August 2018 Q4, 1st leg	(Belarus) BATE Borisov	2–3	(Netherlands) PSV	Barysaw
21:00	Tuominen 9'; Filipenko (yellow card) 38'; Stasevich (yellow card) 40'; Rios (yellow card) 83'; Hleb 88'	Report	De Jong (yellow card) 18'; Pereiro 35' (pen.); Lozano 61', (yellow card) 87'; Malen 89'; Teze (yellow card) 90+7'	Stadium: Borisov Arena; Attendance: 9,284; Referee: Felix Zwayer (Germany)

29 August 2018 Q4, 2nd leg	(Netherlands) PSV	3–0 (6–2 agg.)	(Belarus) BATE Borisov	Eindhoven
21:00	Bergwijn 14'; De Jong 36'; Lozano 62'; Angeliño (yellow card) 82'	Report	Milunović (yellow card) 47'; Rios (yellow card) 59'	Stadium: Philips Stadion; Attendance: 34,200; Referee: Anthony Taylor (England)

==== Group stage ====
Pos	Team	Pld	W	D	L	GF	GA	GD	Pts	Qualification	BAR	TOT	INT	PSV
1	(Spain) Barcelona	6	4	2	0	14	5	+9	14	Advance to knockout phase	—	1–1	2–0	4–0
2	(England) Tottenham Hotspur	6	2	2	2	9	10	−1	8 (Note: Head-to-head away goals: Tottenham Hotspur 1, Inter Milan 0.)	Advance to knockout phase	2–4	—	1–0	2–1
3	(Italy) Inter Milan	6	2	2	2	6	7	−1	8	Transfer to Europa League	1–1	2–1	—	1–1
4	(Netherlands) PSV Eindhoven	6	0	2	4	6	13	−7	2		1–2	2–2	1–2	—

Source: UEFA
Rules for classification: Group stage tiebreakers
Notes:

18 September 2018 1	Barcelona (Spain)	4–0	(Netherlands) PSV	Barcelona, Spain
18:55 CEST (UTC+02:00)	Messi 32', 77', 87'; Dembélé 75'; Umtiti (yellow card) 55' (red card) 79'	Report	Viergever (yellow card) 30'; De Jong (yellow card) 57'	Stadium: Camp Nou; Referee: Anastasios Sidiropoulos (Greece)

3 October 2018 2	PSV (Netherlands)	1–2	(Italy) Internazionale	Eindhoven, Netherlands
21:00 CEST (UTC+02:00)	Rosario 27'	Report	Handanović (yellow card) 41'; Nainggolan 44'; D'Ambrosio (yellow card) 45'; Icardi 60'; Asamoah (yellow card) 86'	Stadium: Philips Stadion; Attendance: 34,750; Referee: Milorad Mažić (Serbia)

24 October 2018 3	PSV (Netherlands)	2–2	(England) Tottenham Hotspur	Eindhoven, Netherlands
18:55 CEST (UTC+02:00)	Lozano 30'; Angeliño (yellow card) 59'; de Jong 87'; Dumfries (yellow card) 90+1'; Rosario (yellow card) 90+5'	Report	Dembélé (yellow card) 20'; Moura 39'; Kane 55'; Lloris (red card) 79'	Stadium: Philips Stadion; Referee: Slavko Vinčić (Slovenia)

6 November 2018 4	Tottenham Hotspur (England)	2–1	(Netherlands) PSV	London, England
21:00 CET (UTC+01:00)	Son (yellow card) 63'; Kane 78', 89'; Trippier (yellow card) 90+5'	Report	De Jong 2'; Lozano (yellow card) 38'; Schwaab (yellow card) 90+3'	Stadium: Wembley Stadium; Attendance: 46,588; Referee: Ivan Kružliak (Slovakia)

28 November 2018 5	PSV (Netherlands)	1–2	(Spain) Barcelona	Eindhoven, Netherlands
21:00 CET (UTC+01:00)	Hendrix (yellow card) 25'; De Jong 83', (yellow card) 84'; Gutiérrez (yellow card) 83'	Report	Messi 61'; Piqué 70', (yellow card) 90+3'; Alba (yellow card) 86'	Stadium: Philips Stadion; Attendance: 34,600; Referee: Pavel Královec (Czech Republic)

11 December 2018 6	Internazionale (Italy)	1–1	(Netherlands) PSV	Milan, Italy
21:00 CET (UTC+01:00)	Brozović (yellow card) 44'; Politano (yellow card) 71'; Icardi 73'; Škriniar (yellow card) 90+5'	Report	Lozano 13'; Zoet (yellow card) 52'; Bergwijn (yellow card) 71'; Sadílek (yellow card) 86'; Dumfries (yellow card) 90+1'	Stadium: San Siro; Attendance: 62,533; Referee: Felix Zwayer (Germany)

== Statistics ==
=== Appearances and goals ===
No.	Pos	Nat	Player	Total		ERE		CL		KNVB Cup		Super Cup	
No.	Pos	Nat	Player	Apps	Goals	Apps	Goals	Apps	Goals	Apps	Goals	Apps	Goals
1	GK	(Netherlands) NED	Jeroen Zoet	43	0	34	0	8	0	0	0	1	0
2	DF	(France) FRA	Nicolas Isimat-Mirin	6	1	1	0	0+3	0	2	1	0	0
3	DF	(Australia) AUS	Aziz Behich	6	0	0+4	0	0	0	2	0	0	0
4	DF	(Netherlands) NED	Nick Viergever	43	3	34	3	8	0	0	0	1	0
5	DF	(Germany) GER	Daniel Schwaab	39	1	31	1	7	0	0	0	1	0
6	DF	(Spain) ESP	Angeliño	43	1	34	1	8	0	0	0	1	0
7	FW	(Uruguay) URU	Gastón Pereiro	36	11	23+4	10	7+1	1	0	0	1	0
8	MF	(Netherlands) NED	Jorrit Hendrix	38	1	27+2	1	8	0	0	0	1	0
9	FW	(Netherlands) NED	Luuk de Jong	43	32	34	28	8	4	0	0	1	0
10	FW	(Argentina) ARG	Maximiliano Romero	2	0	0+1	0	0+1	0	0	0	0	0
11	FW	(Mexico) MEX	Hirving Lozano	40	21	30	17	8	4	0+1	0	0+1	0
13	GK	(Curaçao) CUW	Eloy Room	2	0	0	0	0	0	2	0	0	0
14	FW	(Netherlands) NED	Donyell Malen	41	10	6+24	9	1+7	1	1+1	0	1	0
15	DF	(Netherlands) NED	Armando Obispo	1	0	0	0	0	0	0+1	0	0	0
16	MF	(Belgium) BEL	Dante Rigo	6	1	1+4	1	0	0	1	0	0	0
17	FW	(Netherlands) NED	Steven Bergwijn	41	15	33	14	7	1	0	0	1	0
18	MF	(Netherlands) NED	Pablo Rosario	41	1	32	0	8	1	0	0	1	0
19	FW	(Netherlands) NED	Cody Gakpo	18	2	2+13	1	0+1	0	2	1	0	0
20	DF	(Australia) AUS	Trent Sainsbury	9	1	2+3	0	1+1	0	2	1	0	0
22	DF	(Netherlands) NED	Denzel Dumfries	42	4	33	4	8	0	0	0	1	0
23	MF	(Netherlands) NED	Bart Ramselaar	7	0	0+4	0	0+1	0	2	0	0	0
24	MF	(Sweden) SWE	Ramon Pascal Lundqvist	2	1	0	0	0	0	0+2	1	0	0
25	MF	(Mexico) MEX	Érick Gutiérrez	22	4	5+11	3	1+3	0	2	1	0	0
29	FW	(Belgium) BEL	Matthias Verreth	3	0	0+1	0	0	0	1+1	0	0	0
30	MF	(New Zealand) NZL	Ryan Thomas	0	0	0	0	0	0	0	0	0	0
31	GK	(Netherlands) NED	Yanick van Osch	0	0	0	0	0	0	0	0	0	0
32	MF	(Czech Republic) CZE	Michal Sadílek	13	1	7+4	1	0+1	0	1	0	0	0
33	DF	(Netherlands) NED	Jordan Teze	2	0	0+1	0	0	0	1	0	0	0
38	DF	(Netherlands) NED	Dirk Abels	1	0	0	0	0	0	1	0	0	0
47	FW	(Brazil) BRA	Mauro Júnior	8	1	0+4	0	0+1	0	2	1	0+1	0
48	FW	(Netherlands) NED	Zakaria Aboukhlal	1	0	0+1	0	0	0	0	0	0	0
52	MF	(Netherlands) NED	Mohammed Ihattaren	12	0	4+8	0	0	0	0	0	0	0

=== Disciplinary record ===
No.	Nat.	Name	Eredivisie			Champions League			KNVB Cup			Johan Cruyff Shield			Total		
No.	Nat.	Name	Yellow card	(yellow card) (yellow-red card)	Red card	Yellow card	(yellow card) (yellow-red card)	Red card	Yellow card	(yellow card) (yellow-red card)	Red card	Yellow card	(yellow card) (yellow-red card)	Red card	Yellow card	(yellow card) (yellow-red card)	Red card
1	(Netherlands)	Jeroen Zoet	1	0	0	1	0	0	0	0	0	0	0	0	2	0	0
3	(Australia)	Aziz Behich	0	0	0	0	0	0	1	0	0	0	0	0	1	0	0
4	(Netherlands)	Nick Viergever	3	0	0	1	0	0	0	0	0	0	0	0	4	0	0
5	(Germany)	Daniel Schwaab	1	0	0	1	0	0	0	0	0	0	0	0	2	0	0
6	(Spain)	Angeliño	3	0	0	2	0	0	0	0	0	1	0	0	6	0	0
7	(Uruguay)	Gastón Pereiro	3	0	0	0	0	0	0	0	0	0	0	0	3	0	0
8	(Netherlands)	Jorrit Hendrix	3	0	0	1	0	0	0	0	0	0	0	0	4	0	0
9	(Netherlands)	Luuk de Jong	3	0	0	3	0	0	0	0	0	0	0	0	6	0	0
14	(Netherlands)	Donyell Malen	4	0	0	0	0	0	0	0	0	0	0	0	4	0	0
11	(Mexico)	Hirving Lozano	4	0	0	2	0	0	1	0	0	0	0	0	7	0	0
17	(Netherlands)	Steven Bergwijn	4	0	0	1	0	0	0	0	0	0	0	0	5	0	0
18	(Netherlands)	Pablo Rosario	7	0	0	1	0	0	0	0	0	0	0	0	8	0	0
20	(Australia)	Trent Sainsbury	1	0	0	0	0	0	0	0	0	0	0	0	1	0	0
22	(Netherlands)	Denzel Dumfries	4	0	0	2	0	0	0	0	0	0	0	0	6	0	0
25	(Mexico)	Érick Gutiérrez	1	0	0	1	0	0	0	0	0	0	0	0	2	0	0
32	(Czech Republic)	Michal Sadílek	3	0	0	1	0	0	1	0	0	0	0	0	5	0	0
33	(Netherlands)	Jordan Teze	0	0	0	1	0	0	0	0	0	0	0	0	1	0	0
Total			45	0	0	18	0	0	3	0	0	1	0	0	66	0	0

== Transfers ==
In: Note: Flags indicate national team as defined under FIFA eligibility rules; some limited exceptions apply. Players may hold more than one non-FIFA nationality.

No.	Pos.	Nation	Player
—	DF	ESP	Angeliño (from (England) Manchester City)
—	DF	AUS	Aziz Behich (from (Turkey) Bursaspor)
—	DF	NED	Denzel Dumfries (from (Netherlands) Heerenveen)
—	MF	MEX	Érick Gutiérrez (from (Mexico) Pachuca)
—	DF	AUS	Trent Sainsbury (from (China) Jiangsu Suning)
—	MF	NZL	Ryan Thomas (from (Netherlands) PEC Zwolle)
—	GK	GER	Lars Unnerstall (from (Netherlands) VVV-Venlo)
—	DF	NED	Nick Viergever (from (Netherlands) Ajax)

Out: Note: Flags indicate national team as defined under FIFA eligibility rules; some limited exceptions apply. Players may hold more than one non-FIFA nationality.

No.	Pos.	Nation	Player
—	DF	COL	Santiago Arias (to (Spain) Atlético Madrid)
—	DF	NED	Joshua Brenet (to (Germany) 1899 Hoffenheim)
—	DF	FRA	Nicolas Isimat-Mirin (to (Turkey) Beşiktaş)
—	FW	ISL	Albert Guðmundsson (to (Netherlands) AZ Alkmaar)
—	MF	SWE	Ramon Pascal Lundqvist (to (Netherlands) NAC Breda)
—	DF	NED	Jordy de Wijs (to (England) Hull City)
—	GK	NED	Hidde Jurjus (on loan to (Netherlands) De Graafschap)
—	GK	NED	Luuk Koopmans (on loan to (Netherlands) MVV)
—	FW	NED	Sam Lammers (on loan to (Netherlands) Heerenveen)
—	DF	NED	Derrick Luckassen (on loan to (Germany) Hertha BSC)
—	DF	NED	Kenneth Paal (on loan to (Netherlands) PEC Zwolle)
—	GK	GER	Lars Unnerstall (on loan to (Netherlands) VVV-Venlo)
