= Denzel Dumfries =

Dutch footballer (born 1996)

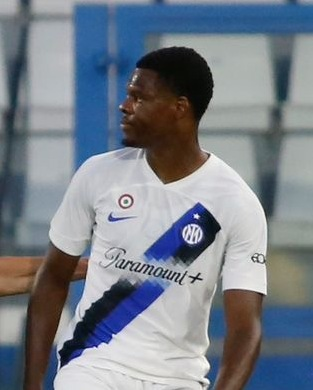
- Dumfries with Inter Milan in 2023

Personal information
- Full name: Denzel Justus Morris Dumfries
- Date of birth: 18 April 1996 (age 30)
- Place of birth: Rotterdam, Netherlands
- Height: 1.88 m (6 ft 2 in)
- Positions: Right-back; right wing-back

Team information
- Current team: Real Madrid
- Number: 24

Youth career
- 2002–2013: Smitshoek
- 2013–2014: BVV Barendrecht

Senior career*
Years	Team	Apps	(Gls)
2014–2017	Sparta Rotterdam	65	(2)
2017–2018	Heerenveen	33	(3)
2018–2021	PSV	89	(13)
2021–2026	Inter Milan	147	(20)
2026–	Real Madrid	8	(0)

International career^{‡}
2014	Aruba	2	(1)
2016	Netherlands U20	4	(0)
2016–2018	Netherlands U21	5	(0)
2018–	Netherlands	82	(11)
Medal record
Men's football
Representing Netherlands
UEFA European Championship
Bronze medal – third place	2024 Germany	Team
UEFA Nations League
Runner-up	2019 Portugal	Team
- * Club domestic league appearances and goals as of 22:05, 25 October 2026 (UTC) ‡ National team caps and goals as of 21:55, 16 November 2026 (UTC)

Denzel Justus Morris Dumfries (born 18 April 1996) is a Dutch professional footballer who plays as a right-back or right wing-back for La Liga club Real Madrid and the Netherlands national team.

Dumfries began his senior career in 2014 at Sparta Rotterdam, helping them gain promotion to the Eredivisie in 2016 as the Eerste Divisie Talent of the Year. In 2017, he joined Heerenveen, before moving to PSV the following year, eventually becoming the club captain. In 2021, Dumfries joined Serie A side Inter Milan, winning the league title in his third season. He eventually joined La Liga club Real Madrid in July 2026.

Born in the Netherlands to an Aruban father, Dumfries initially represented Aruba internationally in 2014, before switching allegiance to the Netherlands. He made his senior debut in 2018, and represented the Netherlands at the UEFA European Championship in 2020 and 2024, and the FIFA World Cup in 2022 and 2026.

== Early life ==
Dumfries was born on 18 April 1996 in Rotterdam, the Netherlands, to an Aruban father Boris, and a Surinamese mother Marleen. His parents named him after American actor Denzel Washington.

Growing up, Dumfries said he was determined to make it as a professional footballer, for which he was ridiculed and mocked by his peers, due to his lack of technical skills at the time. But Dumfries proved his doubters wrong, saying in an interview with Voetbal International: "I knew I would become a professional football player and I said it to everyone: I'm sure I'll make the Dutch national team. I knew that they all thought that doesn't make sense. But I have always proclaimed it. The people who have not seen it in me have been limited in their vision. They only looked at me at the time, but they should have looked further. How can he develop? I think everyone should look at themselves that way, not limit yourself to someone small. You have to look up, not down. What can I achieve, what is my potential and how am I going to get there? I knew exactly what I had to do to take certain steps."

== Club career ==
=== Sparta Rotterdam ===
As a South Hollander, Dumfries began his football career at Spartaan '20 and spent two years before he was released by the club for being "not considered good enough as a boy" and was not well liked by teammates and even trainers. Shortly after, Dumfries then joined Smitshoek, having to "sign up for himself" and said about his time at the club, saying: "As a youth I could already go to Spartaan'20, but that was difficult. My parents always had to bring me, I had to wait until I could ride my own bike. It took some getting used to. Smitshoek was a village, this was in the city. You had to fight for your place, maybe I was a bit too timid among all those city boys. You might find it hard to believe now, but I was a bit shy and reserved. They were all men, tough guys." When he started out playing football, Dumfries played as a striker before converting to defender. Dumfries then signed up for amateur side Barendrecht and spent a year at the club. At one point, Feyenoord scouted the player but they rejected him, claiming that "he's not good enough."

Dumfries then left Barendrecht for Sparta Rotterdam in 2014. Having progressed with the club's youth system within months, he signed his first professional contract with Sparta Rotterdam on a multi-year contract, keeping him at the club until 2017. Dumfries then made his professional debut on 20 February 2015 against Emmen, coming on as a second-half substitute, in a 2–1 loss. He later made two more appearances in the 2014–15 season, both coming on as a substitute.

At the start of the 2015–16 season, Dumfries started out on the substitute bench before he established himself in the first team, playing in the right–back position and helped Sparta Rotterdam become contenders for promotion to Eredivisie. On 7 November 2015, Dumfries signed a contract extension with the club, keeping him at the club until 2019. He then scored his first goal in his professional career, in a 5–2 win against RKC Waalwijk on 18 January 2016. Dumfries started in every match, playing in the right–back position, to help the club maintain their promotion to Eredivisie until he was suspended for one match for picking up five yellow cards this season. After serving a one match suspension, Dumfries returned to the starting line–up against Almere City on 14 March 2016, as Sparta Rotterdam lost 1–0. He later helped the club beat Jong Ajax 3–1 on 11 April 2016 to confirm their promotion to the Eredivisie next season. Throughout the 2015–16 season, Dumfries' performance led to Dutch media, calling him the best player in the league. For his performance, he won both Eerste Divisie Talent of the Year Award and the Bronze Bull. At the end of the 2015–16 season, Dumfries went on to make thirty–three appearances and scoring once in all competitions.

At the start of the 2016–17 season, Dumfries said about the new season, saying: "So the Eredivisie came for me at a good time. I want to keep developing myself, so it's good to have better and smarter opponents against me now. They force me to be smarter in choosing the moments I can come up with, but I think I picked this up pretty quickly." He continued to establish himself in the first team, playing in the right–back position. However, Dumfries received a red card for a second bookable offence, in a 1–1 draw against AZ on 2 October 2016. After serving a one match suspension, he returned to the starting line–up, in a 1–0 loss against PSV Eindhoven on 22 October 2016. Dumfries then scored his first Eredivisie goal, in a 3–2 loss against Excelsior on 19 November 2016. After serving a one match suspension in the next match, he returned to the starting line–up, in a 6–1 loss against Feyenoord on 4 December 2016. However, Dumfries found himself competing with new signing Janne Saksela over the right–back position. As a result, he was dropped to the substitute in favour of Saksela for two separate matches. Despite this, Dumfries continued to regain his first team place, playing in the right–back position for the rest of the 2016–17 season. He later helped Sparta Rotterdam avoid relegation after the club won the last two matches of the season against Twente and Go Ahead Eagles. A month after leaving Sparta Rotterdam, Dumfries was given a farewell send-off prior to the club's match against PEC Zwolle, along with departing teammates Mart Dijkstra, Rick Ketting and David Mendes da Silva.

=== Heerenveen ===
In October 2016, Dumfries stated that he wanted to leave Sparta Rotterdam in hopes of playing in a higher level. In summer 2017, Dumfries joined Heerenveen to replace Belgium-bound Stefano Marzo and signed a four–year contract with the club.

He made his debut for Heerenveen, starting a match in the opening game of the season against Groningen and set up two goals, in a 3–3 draw. Dumfries set up three goals, with twice against ADO Den Haag and once against PSV Eindhoven on 26 August 2017 and 10 September 2017 respectively. Both matches led to Dutch media Algemeen Dagblad to name him in the Team of the Week. He also awarded Eredivisie's Talent of the Month for August. During a match against PSV Eindhoven, Dumfries was subjected of the attention after Jürgen Locadia allegedly spat him, which was caught on camera, leading to an investigation from the KNVB committee. Eventually, Locadia was cleared by the committee after the player came forward to cooperate with the investigation. Since making his debut for the club, he quickly established himself in the first team, playing in the right–back position. His performances impressed so the Dutch media that Dumfries was named in the Team of the Week by Algemeen Dagblad on at least four occasions in the 2017–18 season.

On 9 December 2017, he scored his first goal for Heerenveen, scoring a header with a first equaliser, in an eventual 2–2 draw against VVV. In a league match against AZ Alkmaar on 23 December 2017, Dumfries scored an own goal to give the opposition team an equaliser, which the club eventually lost 3–1. But he was able to make amends by scoring his second goal for Heerenveen, in a 2–1 win against his former club, Sparta Rotterdam on 26 January 2018. A week later on 6 February 2018, Dumfries scored his third goal for the club and setting up one of the goals, in a 3–2 loss against PEC Zwolle. After serving a one match suspension due to picking up five yellow cards this season, he returned to the starting line–up against Willem II and set up a goal, in a 2–0 win on 3 March 2018. In the first leg of the league playoffs for the place in the UEFA Europa League spot against Utrecht, Dumfries scored his fourth goal of the season, in a 4–3 win. However, in the return leg, Utrecht managed to turn the deficit with the results by winning 2–1, resulting the opposition team going through, thanks to away goal rule. At the end of the 2017–18 season, he went on to make thirty–seven appearances and scoring four times in all competitions.

=== PSV ===
On 19 June 2018, Dumfries signed a five-year contract for PSV Eindhoven on a four–year contract, keeping him until 2023. The transfer fee reportedly be to have cost 5.5 million euros. It came after when he replaced the departing defender duo Joshua Brenet and Santiago Arias.

==== 2018–19 season ====
Dumfries made his PSV Eindhoven debut, playing in the right–back position against Feyenoord in the Johan Cruyff Shield and started the whole game throughout 120 minutes, as PSV Eindhoven lost 6–5 on penalties. He scored on his league debut, scoring from a header, as the club won 4–0 against Utrecht in the opening game of the season. After the match, Dumfries was named in the Team of the Week by both De Telegraaf and Algemeen Dagblad. He helped PSV Eindhoven got off to a good start to the season, including qualifying for the UEFA Champions League Group Stage after beating Bate Borisov 6–3 on aggregate and saw the club on a winning streak, resulting in them at the top of the table by the end of the month. Dumfries made his UEFA Champions League debut against Barcelona on 18 September 2018 and started the whole game in the right–back, as PSV Eindhoven lost 4–0. He helped PSV Eindhoven keep five clean sheets in five league matches between 15 September 2018 and 20 October 2018, including a 3–0 win over rivals, Ajax. Dumfries scored his second goal for the club against Groningen on 27 October 2018, which turned out to be a winning goal, in a 2–1 win.

Since the start of the 2018–19 season, he immediately established himself in the first team, playing in the right–back position. Dumfries then scored his third goal for PSV Eindhoven, scoring from a header, in a 4–0 win against Heracles Almelo on 15 December 2018. He then helped the club keep three clean sheets in three matches between 3 March 2019 and 17 March 2019 in attempt to maintain their title contender status. Dumfries set up two goals in two matches between 7 April 2019 and 14 April 2019 against Vitesse and De Graafschap. This was followed up by scoring his fourth goal of the season, in a 3–1 win against ADO Den Haag. However, he was unable to help PSV Eindhoven defend the league title after surrendering it to their rivals, Ajax. Having played in every league match throughout his first season at the club, Dumfries went on to make forty–three appearances and scoring four times in all competitions. For his performance, he was named in the Eredivisie Team of the Year of 2018–19 season.

==== 2019–20 season ====
At the start of the 2019–20 season, Dumfries started in the right–back position in the Johan Cruyff Shield against rivals, Ajax, as PSV Eindhoven lost 2–0. In the opening game of the season, he scored his first goal of the season, scoring an equaliser header, in a 1–1 draw against Twente. Throughout the club's matches in the UEFA Europa League qualification, Dumfries started four times and helped PSV Eindhoven advance to the group stage after beating Haugesund and Apollon Limassol (which he also earned a scoresheet in the first leg). He then scored his third goal of the season, in a 3–1 win against Groningen on 25 September 2019.

A week later on 6 October 2019 against VVV, Dumfries set up a goal for teammate Steven Bergwijn, who in return, set up a goal for him, as the club won 4–1. After the absence of Ibrahim Afellay and Pablo Rosario, it was announced that the player would be appointed as the new captain of PSV Eindhoven. He hinted about taking a captaincy for the club earlier in the season. Dumfries captained his first match for PSV Eindhoven against his former club, SC Heerenveen on 24 November 2019 and helped the club win 2–1. However, he was suspended for one match for picking five yellow cards, causing him to miss a match against PEC Zwolle on 21 December 2019 and was an ever–present in the right–back position since the start of the 2019–20 season until his suspension. Along the way, Dumfries received criticism for his performance, both domestically and internationally in the first half of the 2019–20 season, which he vowed to make an improvement in the second half of the season. After serving a one match suspension, Dumfries scored on his return, scoring a late minute equaliser, in a 1–1 draw against VVV-Venlo on 19 January 2020. This was followed up by scoring again in a 1–1 draw against Twente.

Two weeks later on 8 February 2020, he scored his seventh goal of the season, in a 3–0 win against Willem II. Dumfries scored his eighth goal of the season, in a 1–0 win against Groningen on 8 March 2020, in what turned out to be the last game of the season and the team in fourth place when the season was curtailed because of the COVID-19 pandemic. By the time the season was suspended, he went on to make forty appearances and scoring eight times in all competitions.

==== 2020–21 season ====
Ahead of the 2020–21 season, Dumfries was linked with a move to Serie A clubs, such as, Juventus and Milan. Despite weighing up his options, he ended up staying at PSV Eindhoven, leading the club to start a new contract negotiation with the player. At the start of the 2020–21 season, Dumfries resumed his captain role at PSV Eindhoven after Roger Schmidt chose him over Pablo Rosario. He helped the club make a good start to the season in first place in the first five league matches of the season and reaching the group stage in the UEFA Europa League.

After recovering from COVID-19, Dumfries made his return to the starting line–up against Willem II on 8 November 2020 and set up two goals, in a 3–0 win. Following this, he continued to regain his first team place, playing in the right–back position, as well as, retaining his captaincy for PSV Eindhoven. Dumfries then scored his first goal of the season, in a 4–0 win against AC Omonia in the UEFA Europa League on 10 December 2020. He made his 100th appearance for the club, in a 2–1 win against De Graafschap in the second round of the KNVB Cup on 16 December 2020. Three days later on 19 December 2020, Dumfries scored his third goal of the season, in a 4–1 win against RKC Waalwijk. In late–December, he later said his aim as captain was to help PSV Eindhoven win the league.

Dumfries scored his third goal of the season, in a 2–0 win against Volendam in the last 16 of the KNVB Cup on 19 January 2021. Having played in the right–back position for most of the season, he played in the right–midfield position against Vitesse on 21 February 2021, due to a rotation change made by Schmidt and the club went on to win 3–1. Dumfries then scored his fourth goal of the season, in a 3–0 win against Heracles Almelo on 4 April 2021. This was followed up by helping PSV Eindhoven keep two clean sheets in the next two matches to make it three in a row. His suspension against Heerenveen on 2 May 2021 saw the club draw 2–2, resulting in them losing their league title chances to rivals, Ajax. Despite suffering minor injuries on three separate occasions throughout the 2020–21 season, he went on to make forty–one appearances and scoring four times in all competitions.

Throughout the 2020–21 season, contract negotiations were a talking point as to whether Dumfries would stay at PSV Eindhoven. By February, the agreement had yet to be reached between the two parties. In April 2021, it was expected that Dumfries would be leaving the club in the summer transfer window. Throughout UEFA Euro 2020 with impressive performances, interest in signing the Dumfries increased from clubs around Europe, with Everton, Bayern Munich and Inter Milan all interested.

=== Inter Milan ===
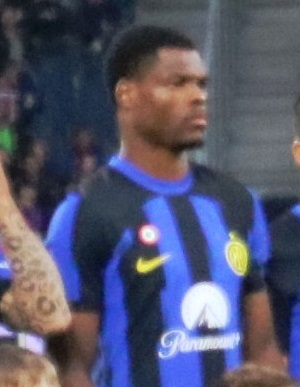
Denzel Dumfries in a starting line-up against Red Bull Salzburg on 9 August 2023.

Dumfries joined Serie A champions Inter Milan on 14 August 2021 for €12.5 million, with a further €2.5 million as a bonus for the PSV Eindhoven. It was reported by the Dutch media that his former clubs would receive compensations as part of the transfer. Upon joining the club, he was given a number two shirt.

Dumfries made his debut for Inter Milan as a second-half substitute against Genoa on the opening day of the 2021–22 Serie A season, winning 4–0.

==== 2023–24 season ====
Dumfries began his third season at Inter as the first choice right wingback. He scored his first goal of the season on the second match day, scoring Inter's first goal in what would prove to be a 2–0 away victory for the Nerazzurri against Cagliari.

==== 2024–25 season ====
Dumfries was a pivotal figure for Inter Milan during the 2024–25 season, showcasing his versatility and consistency across multiple competitions. He operated primarily and mainly as a right wing-back in Simone Inzaghi's defensive tactical setup.

On 15 September 2024, Dumfries scored a late equalizer at the Brianteo Stadium in a 1–1 draw against Monza, salvaging a point for Inter in a challenging away fixture and eventually got named the MVP of the game. Also, in a thrilling high-scoring 4-all draw against the Bianconeri, he scored Inter's fourth goal giving Inter a two-goal cushion before Juventus fought back to win a point.

He went on a goalscoring galore in January 2025, scoring in four different games that month including a brace, the only goals, against Atalanta in the semifinals of the Supercoppa Italiana and another in a 2–2 draw with Bologna, another in a Serie A game against Empoli in a 3–1 win, and the last one, in the month of January 2025, coming in a dominant 4–1 victory against Leece. On 30 April, he scored twice against Barcelona which ended in an eventual 3–3 draw away from home. Six days later, on 7 May, Dumfries provided two assists in a 4–3 win after extra time against Barça, sending Inter through to their second Champions League final in just under three years under Simone Inzaghi. After both ties against Barcelona, Dumfries said: "It was a crazy match again, seven goals on Tuesday, it was incredible". He added: "We fought until the end, and very proud of the way we fought today." In December 2025, it was announced that Dumfries had changed his agent from Jorge Mendes to Ali Barat.

==== 2025–26 season ====
Dumfries sustained an ankle injury during a 2–0 victory over Lazio on 10 November 2025, which sidelined him for several months after he underwent surgery. He returned to competitive action in March 2026, rejoining the squad during the final stages of the season. He subsequently played an important role in the closing months of the campaign as Inter secured a domestic double, winning both the Serie A title and the Coppa Italia.

=== Real Madrid ===
On 5 July 2026, Dumfries signed for La Liga club Real Madrid on a four-year contract after Los Blancos activated the release clause, reported to be €20 million. He made his debut on 22 August 2026, in a 2–1 win over Espanyol.

== International career ==
=== Aruba ===
Dumfries was eligible to represent Aruba through his father, Suriname through his mother, and his birthplace, the Netherlands. While still at Barendrecht, Dumfries received a call-up to play for the Aruba national team. He made his debut in a March 2014 friendly match against Guam, starting a match, in a 2–2 draw. Dumfries scored a goal against the same opposition in their second encounter a few days later.

However, Dumfries maintained his desires to represent Netherlands because he believed playing for the Oranje was his international future. During his success in the UEFA Euro 2020, then Aruba manager Giovanni Franken told in an interview how people in Aruba were critical of Dumfries' decision to reject the national team, calling him a "traitor" at the time.

=== Netherlands youth team ===
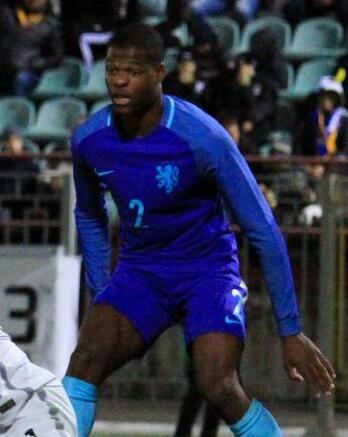
Dumfries with Netherlands U21 in 2017

In March 2016, Dumfries was called up to the Netherlands U20 squad for the first time. He made his Oranje U20 debut on 24 March 2016 against Portugal U20 and started the whole game, as they drew 1–1. Dumfries later made three more appearances by the end of the year.

In November 2016, Dumfries was called up to the Netherlands U21 squad for the first time. He made his debut for the Oranje U21, coming on as a 57th-minute substitute, in a 1–1 draw against Portugal U21 on 15 November 2016. Dumfries became a first choice right–back for Netherlands U21, playing five times in 2017, mostly for the UEFA European Under-21 Championship qualification. However, he continued to remain in the starting eleven for Oranje U21 between March and September. Dumfries went on to make eleven appearances for Netherlands U21.

=== Netherlands ===
Ronald Koeman named Dumfries in the Netherlands squad for the first time in October 2018. He played his first international match against Germany on 13 October 2018, as the Oranje national team won 3–0. After the match, Dumfries reflected on his debut, saying: "On the way to the game I had a moment of: this is really what I wanted and in which no one believed in. At that moment you are really proud of yourself. A fantastic moment for me, I worked hard for this." Although he was featured in a 2–0 win against France, Netherlands qualified for League A in the UEFA Nations League where they would qualify to the final four after drawing with Germany on the final match day, beating France by head-to-head records. During a 4–0 win against Belarus on 21 March 2019, Dumfries started in a European qualifier match and played 68 minutes before being substituted, due to suffering from a groin injury. But he quickly recovered and was featured in a match against Germany on 24 March 2019, as Netherlands lost 3–2.

In May 2019, Dumfries was called up to the Netherlands squad for the inaugural UEFA Nations League Finals. He started the whole game against England in the semi–finals on 6 June 2019 and helped Oranje win 3–1 to reach the final. After the match, his performance was praised by FC Update, saying: "Without him, the Netherlands would probably have fallen 0-2 behind". However, in the final against Portugal three days later on 9 June 2019, Dumfries started the whole game, as Oranje lost 1–0. After the match, his performance came under criticism for his poor display throughout the match, a criticism he acknowledged, calling his performance "sloppy". Between 2018 and 2019, Dumfries fought for his place in with Netherlands, competing in the right–back position with Kenny Tete and Joël Veltman.

Having not played for Oranje for almost a year, Dumfries made his first appearances for Netherlands against Italy on 7 September 2020, coming on as a 70th-minute substitute, in a 1–0 loss. In a UEFA Nations League match against Bosnia and Herzegovina on 15 November 2020, he set up two goals for Oranje, as they won 3–1. In May 2021, Dumfries was named in the Dutch 34-man preliminary squad for Euro 2020 on 14 May 2021, with the 26-man squad to be announced on 26 May. The tournament took place in the summer of 2021 due to the previous year's postponement as a result of Coronavirus. He was included in the final 26-man squad on 26 May. Dutch football expert James Rowe told BBC Sport that, prior to the start of the tournament, De Boer's favoured 5-3-2 formation would suit Dumfries and the marauding wing-back has looked more like a right-sided forward at times.

On 13 June 2021, Dumfries scored his first goal for the Netherlands, netting the winner in a 3–2 win over Ukraine at UEFA Euro 2020. After the match, FC Update said about his performance: "A taxi can go fast, but if it doesn't drop you off at your destination, it's of little use. With his energy, Dumfries was great in the first half, but the finish was dramatic. He was (in)directly involved in both the first and second Orange goal, although he did not receive an assist before that and in fact he was annoyingly offside for the second goal. But the goal stood still and with his striking header (his first international goal!) it was still Dumfries' evening." He followed this up with a goal in the next game against Austria in a 2–0 win. Having helped Netherlands qualify for the knockout stage, Dumfries was named Best Eleven of the group stage tournament. The Dutch were knocked out in the Round of 16 after a 2–0 loss against Czech Republic on 27 June at the Puskás Aréna in Budapest.

In November 2022, he was named in the final squad for the 2022 FIFA World Cup in Qatar. On 3 December, he scored a goal and provided two assists in a 3–1 win over the United States in the round of 16.

On 29 May 2024, Dumfries was named in the Netherlands' squad for UEFA Euro 2024. On 27 May 2026, he was included in the Netherlands squad for the 2026 FIFA World Cup.

== Style of play ==
Former teammate Daniël Esajas said about Dumfries: "As humble, almost shy as Denzel could be off the field, he was so convinced of his footballing qualities. He never doubted that he would reach the absolute top. Denzel had one quality that many of his peers lacked: an unwavering commitment. But he sometimes took it too far. He wanted to give the pass and then head the ball in himself. I can still see Denzel racing across that field. Then he would have picked up the ball from his own keeper. And there he then went with those big steps, in one straight line to the other side, directly towards his goal. Denzel wasn't even super wide, rather tall. But he was just unbearable for opponents. He went right through them like an elephant. Boom Boom Boom!". Dumfries said about his position: "Still, I think eliminating the opponent is the most important task of a right back. You are, after all, on the defensive. I can make quite a few meters and I like to do that. It's part of my game. With personal trainer Hans Kroon, we do a lot of strength training so that we become stronger every day. I may have to act smarter sometimes, but things like that come with time. Every game, I get better and I gain experience. I can use that experience, for example, to ensure that I never get into positional problems again." He further stated: "They used to say I had ADHD, but I like to give gas, I always want to do that. I was thinking about it and thought: these are nice games that I play. I played them last year and not the year before. Very nice. It is addictive to act at the highest level."

Then manager Alex Pastoor said about Dumfries, saying: "He has a lot of conditions to be able to reach the absolute top. Just look at his physique. If you can come up eighty times per half... Those are things that ultimately the biggest clubs in the world fall for." His performance against Ajax on 23 October 2018 led former defender Ben Wijnstekers commenting: "I think he's great. Dumfries led the fight and that was typical of PSV. He was incredibly aggressive in the duels, bit into his opponent and kept coming up. He has an enormous condition and was very irritating for Ajax. Such a player is great to have on your team. He is sometimes too hot-tempered and because of his enthusiasm he occasionally makes unnecessary violations. He has to be a little smarter in that. And in terms of standing up, he might also be able to dose a little more." Italian newspaper La Gazzetta dello Sport compared Dumfries to the cryptocurrency Bitcoin, writing: "In the beginning nobody trusts it, but you had better invest in it", which he responded by laughing in the press conference. De Telegraaf reporter John de Wolf commented about Dumfries, saying: "Denzel Dumfries played less conspicuously this time, not as compelling as usual. That's possible once. I worked with Denzel at Jong Sparta and later experienced as an assistant how he came to the first of Sparta. That was four years ago and when you see what he has achieved in the meantime, it is very impressive. You could then did not predict that he would achieve this. But Denzel stood out with his head power, jumping power and speed. I got to know him as a very enthusiastic boy, who had the absolute drive and passion to improve himself. It is admirable how he has done that."

Both Netherlands manager Koeman and then PSV Eindhoven manager Mark van Bommel praised Dumfries' development during the 2018–19 season. However, he faced criticism for playing the ball back instead of pressing more forward often. Dumfries responded to criticism, saying: "Then it's up to me to remain undisturbed. Just do my own thing and don't go crazy, to prove myself extra. Do everything I can to defend that goal. It's nice that I get that ball off the line." Former PSV Eindhoven manager Aad de Mos believed that Dumfries had the potential to be in the national team squad, though he thought that Dumfries needed to improve on his crosses. Dumfries said in an interview on the club's website that he has improved on his crosses since then. Former PSV Eindhoven player Kenneth Perez described Dumfries as "someone who stands out for his team".

== Personal life ==
Dumfries has two cousins, Jason and Jahfarr Wilnis, who are both kickboxers. In September 2020, he became a father for the first time.

In May 2020, Dumfries was among several players and staff members who agreed to give up a month's salary, due to the COVID-19 pandemic. On 25 October 2020, Dumfries tested positive for COVID-19 amid the pandemic in the Netherlands.

Dumfries has spoken out about racism, saying: "I don't like to play the victim role, but such incidents do come. I want to hear what drives someone, to think that this is funny. I am very open about that. I want to start such a conversation. That is the only way to learn to understand each other. In a football team, jokes are part and parcel, but it is always done within frameworks and with respect. It is binding, we also show interest in each other, regardless of origin or religion. That is what makes a team and that should be the case for the whole of society apply."

Dumfries is a devout Christian, and states that he prays along with his fellow Netherlands teammates before every match.

== Career statistics ==
=== Club ===
As of match played 4 November 2026

Appearances and goals by club, season and competition
Club	Season	League			National cup (Note: Includes KNVB Cup, Coppa Italia, Copa del Rey)		Europe		Other		Total	
Club	Season	Division	Apps	Goals	Apps	Goals	Apps	Goals	Apps	Goals	Apps	Goals
Sparta Rotterdam	2014–15	Eerste Divisie	3	0	0	0	—		—		3	0
Sparta Rotterdam	2015–16	Eerste Divisie	31	1	2	0	—		—		33	1
Sparta Rotterdam	2016–17	Eredivisie	31	1	5	0	—		—		36	1
Sparta Rotterdam	Total		65	2	7	0	—		—		72	2
Heerenveen	2017–18	Eredivisie	33	3	2	0	—		2 (Note: Appearances in Eredivisie European play-offs)	1	37	4
PSV Eindhoven	2018–19	Eredivisie	34	4	0	0	8 (Note: Appearances in UEFA Champions League)	0	1 (Note: Appearance in Johan Cruyff Shield)	0	43	4
PSV Eindhoven	2019–20	Eredivisie	25	7	2	0	12 (Note: Two appearances in UEFA Champions League, ten appearances and one goal in UEFA Europa League)	1	1	0	40	8
PSV Eindhoven	2020–21	Eredivisie	30	2	3	1	8 (Note: Appearances in UEFA Europa League)	1	—		41	4
PSV Eindhoven	Total		89	13	5	1	28	2	2	0	124	16
Inter Milan	2021–22	Serie A	33	5	4	0	7	0	1 (Note: Appearance in Supercoppa Italiana)	0	45	5
Inter Milan	2022–23	Serie A	34	1	5	0	12	1	0	0	51	2
Inter Milan	2023–24	Serie A	31	4	0	0	5	0	0	0	36	4
Inter Milan	2024–25	Serie A	29	7	2	0	12	2	4 (Note: Two appearances and two goals in Supercoppa Italiana, two appearances in FIFA Club World Cup)	2	47	11
Inter Milan	2025–26	Serie A	20	3	3	0	5	2	0	0	28	5
Inter Milan	Total		147	20	14	0	41	5	5	2	207	27
Real Madrid	2026–27	La Liga	8	0	0	0	3	0	0	0	11	0
Career total			340	38	28	1	72	7	9	3	449	49

=== International ===
As of match played 16 November 2026

Appearances and goals by national team and year
National team	Year	Apps	Goals
Aruba	2014	2	1
Total		2	1
Netherlands	2018	3	0
Netherlands	2019	6	0
Netherlands	2020	5	0
Netherlands	2021	16	3
Netherlands	2022	12	3
Netherlands	2023	8	0
Netherlands	2024	13	3
Netherlands	2025	6	2
Netherlands	2026	13	0
Total		82	11

Scores and results list Aruba's goal tally first, score column indicates score after each Dumfries goal.

List of Aruba international goals scored by Denzel Dumfries
No.	Date	Venue	Cap	Opponent	Score	Result	Competition
1	30 March 2014	Trinidad Stadium, Oranjestad, Aruba	2	Guam	1–0	2–0	Friendly

Scores and results list Netherlands' goal tally first, score column indicates score after each Dumfries goal.

List of Netherlands international goals scored by Denzel Dumfries
No.	Date	Venue	Cap	Opponent	Score	Result	Competition
1	13 June 2021	Johan Cruyff Arena, Amsterdam, Netherlands	20	Ukraine	3–2	3–2	UEFA Euro 2020
2	17 June 2021	Johan Cruyff Arena, Amsterdam, Netherlands	21	Austria	2–0	2–0	UEFA Euro 2020
3	11 October 2021	De Kuip, Rotterdam, Netherlands	28	Gibraltar	4–0	6–0	2022 FIFA World Cup qualification
4	3 June 2022	King Baudouin Stadium, Brussels, Belgium	33	Belgium	3–0	4–1	2022–23 UEFA Nations League A
5	11 June 2022	De Kuip, Rotterdam, Netherlands	34	Poland	2–2	2–2	2022–23 UEFA Nations League A
6	3 December 2022	Khalifa International Stadium, Al Rayyan, Qatar	41	United States	3–1	3–1	2022 FIFA World Cup
7	10 September 2024	Johan Cruyff Arena, Amsterdam, Netherlands	60	Germany	2–2	2–2	2024–25 UEFA Nations League A
8	11 October 2024	Puskás Aréna, Budapest, Hungary	61	Hungary	1–1	1–1	2024–25 UEFA Nations League A
9	16 November 2024	Johan Cruyff Arena, Amsterdam, Netherlands	63	Hungary	3–0	4–0	2024–25 UEFA Nations League A
10	7 June 2025	Helsinki Olympic Stadium, Helsinki, Finland	64	Finland	2–0	2–0	2026 FIFA World Cup qualification
11	4 September 2025	De Kuip, Rotterdam, Netherlands	66	Poland	1–0	1–1	2026 FIFA World Cup qualification

== Honours ==
Sparta Rotterdam

- Eerste Divisie: 2015–16

Inter Milan

- Serie A: 2023–24, 2025–26
- Coppa Italia: 2021–22, 2022–23, 2025–26
- Supercoppa Italiana: 2021, 2022, 2023
- UEFA Champions League runner-up: 2022–23, 2024–25

Individual

- Eredivisie Talent of the Month: August 2017
- Eredivisie Team of the Year: 2018–19
- Serie A Team of the Year: 2024–25
