= Pablo Rosario =

Dutch footballer (born 1997)

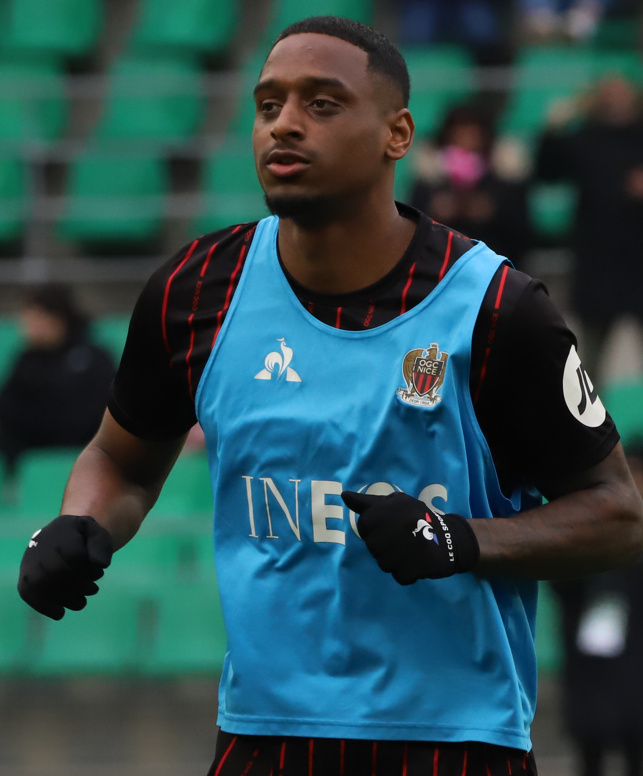
- Rosario with Nice in 2025

Personal information
- Full name: Cristian Pablo Mañón Paulino
- Birth name: Cristian Pablo Paulino Rosario
- Date of birth: 7 January 1997 (age 29)
- Place of birth: Amsterdam, Netherlands
- Height: 1.88 m (6 ft 2 in)
- Position: Midfielder

Team information
- Current team: Porto
- Number: 13

Youth career
- 2007–2008: AVV Swift
- 2008: Feyenoord
- 2008–2010: DWS
- 2010–2014: Ajax
- 2014–2015: Almere City

Senior career*
Years	Team	Apps	(Gls)
2015–2016	Almere City	34	(3)
2016–2021	Jong PSV	43	(7)
2017–2021	PSV	101	(3)
2021–2025	Nice	124	(3)
2025–	Porto	32	(2)

International career^{‡}
2013	Netherlands U16	3	(0)
2015–2016	Netherlands U19	7	(0)
2016–2017	Netherlands U20	7	(0)
2017	Netherlands U21	11	(0)
2018	Netherlands	1	(0)
2025–	Dominican Republic	13	(1)
- * Club domestic league appearances and goals as of 4 November 2026 ‡ National team caps and goals as of 29 September 2026

Cristian Pablo Mañón Paulino (born 7 January 1997), known as Pablo Rosario, is a professional footballer who plays as a midfielder for Primeira Liga club Porto. Rosario made one appearance for the Netherlands national team, before switching to play for the Dominican Republic national team.

== Club career ==
=== Early career ===
Born in the Netherlands to parents from the Dominican Republic, Rosario began his football career in the youth ranks of AVV Swift, followed by a brief stint with Feyenoord, before joining his local club DWS. In 2012 Dutch broadcasting company HUMAN released the documentary film The Price of Heaven which follows Rosario from the period in which he captained the under-13 squad of DWS.

Having been sensationalized as the next Ronaldo by the media, Rosario is confronted with the choice of joining the youth academies of either Ajax, Feyenoord or PSV, the top three clubs in the country. Rosario eventually decided for Ajax and in 2010 he joined the B2 squad (under-16) under coach Orlando Trustfull.

=== Almere City ===
In 2014, Rosario transferred to Ajax's partner club Almere City. On 7 August 2015, he made his debut for the first team in the Eerste Divisie, the second tier of professional football in the Netherlands, in a 3–3 draw at home against VVV-Venlo. He was subbed on by head coach Maarten Stekelenburg in the 59th minute for Soufyan Ahannach.

=== PSV ===
On 25 July 2016, Rosario signed a four-year deal for Dutch club PSV. He managed to achieve the 2017–18 Eredivisie title with the club. On 3 October 2018, he scored his first goal for PSV in a 2–1 defeat against Inter Milan in the Champions League.

=== Nice ===
On 27 July 2021, Rosario signed for French club Nice. On 20 September 2024, he netted his first goal in an 8–0 victory over Saint-Étienne.

=== Porto ===
On 28 August 2025, Rosario signed for the Portuguese giants Porto as their new number 13.

== International career ==
Born in the Netherlands, Rosario is of Dominican descent. He made his international debut playing for the Netherlands under-16 side in a friendly match against Austria U-16 on 9 February 2013. On 12 November 2015, he made his debut for the Netherlands U19 in a 2016 UEFA European Under-19 Championship qualification match against England U19 which ended in a 2–2 draw.

Rosario earned his first full international call up when Ronald Koeman named him in the Netherlands squad in October 2018. He made his international debut in a friendly against Belgium on 16 October, coming on as a half-time substitute.

On 29 May 2025, Rosario's request to switch international allegiance to the Dominican Republic was approved by FIFA.

== Filmography ==
Documentary
Year	Title	Role
2012	The Price of Heaven	Himself

== Career statistics ==
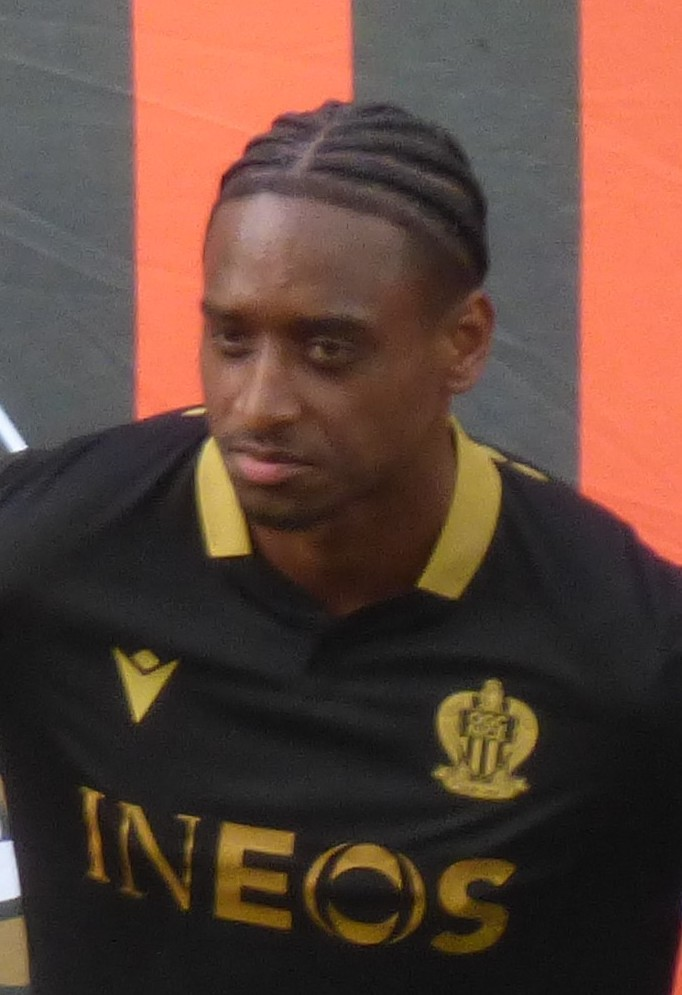
Rosario with Nice in 2022

=== Club ===
As of match played 8 September 2026

Appearances and goals by club, season and competition
Club	Season	League			National cup (Note: Includes KNVB Cup, Coupe de France, Taça de Portugal)		League cup (Note: Includes Taça da Liga)		Continental		Other		Total	
Club	Season	Division	Apps	Goals	Apps	Goals	Apps	Goals	Apps	Goals	Apps	Goals	Apps	Goals
Almere City	2015–16	Eerste Divisie	34	3	2	0	—		—		4 (Note: Appearances in Eerste Divisie promotion play-offs)	0	40	3
Jong PSV	2016–17	Eerste Divisie	31	7	—		—		—		—		31	7
Jong PSV	2017–18	Eerste Divisie	12	0	—		—		—		—		12	0
Jong PSV	Total		43	7	—		—		—		—		43	7
PSV Eindhoven	2017–18	Eredivisie	14	0	1	0	—		0	0	0	0	15	0
PSV Eindhoven	2018–19	Eredivisie	32	0	0	0	—		8 (Note: Appearance(s) in UEFA Champions League)	1	1 (Note: Appearance in Johan Cruyff Shield)	0	41	1
PSV Eindhoven	2019–20	Eredivisie	26	2	2	0	—		12 (Note: Two appearances in UEFA Champions League, ten appearances and one goal in UEFA Europa League)	1	1	0	41	3
PSV Eindhoven	2020–21	Eredivisie	29	1	3	0	—		8 (Note: Appearances in UEFA Europa League)	0	0	0	40	1
PSV Eindhoven	2021–22	Eredivisie	0	0	0	0	—		1	0	0	0	1	0
PSV Eindhoven	Total		101	3	6	0	—		29	2	2	0	138	5
Nice	2021–22	Ligue 1	36	0	4	0	—		—		—		40	0
Nice	2022–23	Ligue 1	31	0	0	0	—		8 (Note: Appearances in UEFA Europa Conference League)	0	—		39	0
Nice	2023–24	Ligue 1	28	0	3	0	—		—		—		31	0
Nice	2024–25	Ligue 1	29	3	1	0	—		5	1	—		35	4
Nice	2025–26	Ligue 1	1	0	0	0	—		0	0	—		1	0
Nice	Total		125	3	8	0	—		13	1	0	0	146	4
Porto	2025–26	Primeira Liga	22	2	5	0	1	0	12	0	—		40	2
Porto	2026–27	Primeira Liga	10	0	1	0	1	0	3	0	0	0	15	0
Porto	Total		32	2	7	0	1	0	15	0	0	0	55	2
Career total			335	18	22	0	2	0	57	3	6	0	422	21

=== International ===
As of match played 29 September 2026

Appearances and goals by national team and year
National team	Year	Apps	Goals
Netherlands
Netherlands	2018	1	0
Netherlands	Total	1	0
Dominican Republic
Dominican Republic	2025	9	0
Dominican Republic	2026	4	1
Dominican Republic	Total	13	1
Career total		14	1

Scores and results list Dominican Republic's goal tally first, score column indicates score after each Rosario goal.

List of international goals scored by Pablo Rosario
No.	Date	Venue	Opponent	Score	Result	Competition
1	24 September 2026	Estadio Cibao FC, Santiago de los Caballeros, Dominican Republic	Nicaragua	3–2	3–2	2026–27 CONCACAF Nations League A

== Honours ==
PSV

- Eredivisie: 2017–18

Nice

- Coupe de France runner-up: 2021–22

Porto

- Primeira Liga: 2025–26
- Supertaça Cândido de Oliveira: 2026
