= 2014–15 AZ Alkmaar season =

AZ
- Full name: Alkmaar Zaanstreek
- Nickname: The Cheese Farmers

2014–15 AZ Alkmaar season
2014/15 season
- Chairman: René Neelissen
- Manager: John van den Brom
- Ground: AFAS Stadion capacity: 17,023
- Eredivisie: 3rd
- KNVB Cup: Quarter-final
- Top goalscorer: League: Nemanja Gudelj (11); All: Nemanja Gudelj (12)
Home colours

During the 2014–15 season, AZ competed in the Eredivisie for the 17th consecutive season and the KNVB CUP under new manager Marco van Basten, and then John van den Brom after Van Basten relinquished his role after health issues, becoming assistant to Van den Brom. Under Gertjan Verbeek and Dick Advocaat the previous season, AZ lost their title of KNVB Cup to PEC Zwolle after being eliminated in the semi-finals by eventual league winners Ajax and finishing eighth in the league.

== Background ==
Following the 2013–14 season in which AZ broke their record for most competitive games in a season (58) which started in the KNVB Cup on 27 July 2013 (an extra time loss to Ajax) and ended in the Eredivisie UEFA Europa League play-offs (3–0 loss to Groningen).

During this run of 58 games, Gertjan Verbeek was sacked and Dick Advocaat was brought out of retirement to replace Verbeek until the end of the season. The club finished in 8th and lost at the final stages of the play-offs for European football.

League results were inconsistent, although the club managed to make the quarter-finals of the 2013–14 UEFA Europa League, playing Atromitos, PAOK, Maccabi Haifa, Shakhter Karagandy, Slovan Liberec, Anzhi Makhachkala before being eliminated by Benfica.

For the new season, Marco van Basten left Heerenveen to sign a two-year contract at AZ, expressing his desire for the new challenge.

== Transfers ==
=== Arrivals ===
- The following players moved to AZ.

	Name	Position	Previous club	Fee	Date
Substituted on	(Netherlands) Guus Hupperts	RW	(Netherlands) Roda JC	€1,000,000	Summer
Substituted on	(Netherlands) Robert Mühren	CF	(Netherlands) Volendam	€300,000	Summer
Substituted on	(Netherlands) Djavan Anderson	RB	(Netherlands) Ajax U19	€200,000	Summer
Substituted on	(Sweden) Muamer Tanković	FW	(England) Fulham U21	Free (end of contract)	Summer
Substituted on	(Uruguay) Sergio Rochet	GK	(Uruguay) Danubio	Undiscolsed	Summer

=== Departures ===
- The following players moved from AZ.

	Name	Position	New club	Fee	Date
Substituted off	(Netherlands) Nick Viergever	CB/LB/CDM	(Netherlands) Ajax	€2,000,000	Summer
Substituted off	(Netherlands) Roy Beerens	RW	(Germany) Hertha BSC	€1,500,000	Summer
Substituted off	(Netherlands) Ruud Boymans	CF	(Netherlands) Utrecht	Undisclosed	Summer
Substituted off	(Finland) Thomas Lam	CB	(Netherlands) PEC Zwolle	Free (percentage of next sale)	Summer
Substituted off	(Iceland) Johann Berg Guðmundsson	LW	(England) Charlton Athletic	Free (end of contract)	Summer
Substituted off	(Netherlands) Etiënne Reijnen	CB	(Netherlands) Cambuur	Free (end of contract)	Summer
Substituted off	(Netherlands) Erik Falkenburg	CM	(Netherlands) NAC Breda	Free (end of contract)	Summer
Substituted off	(Netherlands) Hobie Velhurst	GK	(Netherlands) MVV Maastricht	Free (end of contract)	Summer
Substituted off	(Netherlands) Erik Heijblok	GK	(Netherlands) Volendam	Free (end of contract)	Summer
Substituted off	(Netherlands) Paul Kok	LB	(Netherlands) Oss	Free (end of contract)	Summer
Substituted off	(Cameroon) Willie Overtoom	CAM	(Belgium) Zulte Waregem	Contract terminated	Summer
Substituted off	(Netherlands) Dirk Marcellis	RB	(Netherlands) NAC Breda	Contract expired	Summer
Substituted off	(Netherlands) Mikhail Rosheuvel	RW	(Netherlands) Cambuur	Undisclosed	January
Substituted off	(Sweden) Viktor Elm	CM	(Sweden) Kalmar FF	Undisclosed	March

=== Loans ===
- The following players moved to new clubs whilst under contract at AZ.

	Name	Position	New club	Loan period
Substituted off	(Belgium) Jonas Heymans	LB	(Netherlands) Willem II	Full season
Substituted off	(Netherlands) Joris van Overeem	CM	(Netherlands) Dordrecht	Full season
Substituted off	(Sweden) Denni Avdić	ST	(Netherlands) Heracles Almelo	Full season
Substituted off	(Netherlands) Donny Gorter	LB/CM	(Denmark) Aalborg BK	Full season
Substituted off	(Netherlands) Fernando Lewis	FW	(Netherlands) Go Ahead Eagles	August–January
Substituted off	(Netherlands) Fernando Lewis	FW	(Netherlands) Dordrecht	January–May
Substituted off	(Australia) Eli Babalj	CF	(Netherlands) PEC Zwolle	January–May
Substituted off	(Netherlands) Raymond Gyasi	FW	(Netherlands) Roda JC	January–May

== Pre-season friendlies ==
AZ's pre-season began on 30 June with their first training session and consisted of seven official matches which started with an away friendly match on 5 July 2014 against Dutch amateurs SVW '27 from Heerhugowaard, just outside Alkmaar, and amateur club AFC '34 from Alkmaar.

5 July 2014 Friendly	SVW’27	1–14	AZ	(Netherlands) Heerhugowaard
	Bakker 2'		Tanković 4', 44'; Haye 7', 45'; Berghuis 16'; Gorter 28' (pen.); Wuytens 35'; Johansson 42'; Avdić 49', 71'; Elm 57'; Rosheuvel 60'; Henriksen 62'; Haps 90'	Stadium: Sportpark de Kabel

9 July 2014 Friendly	AFC '34	1–4	AZ	(Netherlands) Alkmaar
	Ben Hamed 11'		Tanković 12' (pen.), 32'; Henriksen 40'; Anderson 53'	Stadium: Robonsbosweg

Following the games against amateur opposition the club played a friendly with the full AZ squad, with two teams (blue and red) where both teams were mixed with regular first team players.

13 July 2014 Friendly	AZ Rood (red)	1–2	AZ Blauw (blue)	(Netherlands) Alkmaar
	Van Overeem 49'		Tanković 27'; Gorter 75' (pen.)	Stadium: AFAS Stadion training field

Then followed a weeks training camp in Epe, Netherlands where AZ played their first games against professional teams in the pre-season; they played reserves against NEC, newly relegated from the Eredivisie, on the Saturday and then on Sunday fielded a full strength team against Gabala FK of Azerbaijan on the final day of the training camp.

19 July 2014 Friendly	AZ	0–0	NEC	(Netherlands) Epe
	-		-	Stadium: sv Wissel; Attendance: 400; Referee: Wim Bronsvoort

20 July 2014 Friendly	AZ	2–0	(Azerbaijan) Gabala	(Netherlands) Epe
	Tanković 27', 70'		Urfan Abbasov (yellow card) ?'; Ropotan (yellow card) ?'; Marquinhos Carioca (yellow card) ?'	Stadium: sv Wissel; Attendance: 250; Referee: Jochem Kamphuis

After the training camp in Epe, AZ had a specially arranged friendly against Eerste Divisie side VVV to celebrate exactly 60th anniversary since the two teams first met in a competitive game. This special fixture had silverware to be won in the form of the Herman Teeuwen Bokkal, a pre-season competition organised by VVV to play larger teams for the trophy named after the legendary VVV player and scout Herman Teeuwen. After VVV winning against OFI last year on this occasion AZ were victorious and awarded the cup;here is the AZ captain, Nemanja Gudelj, with the trophy.

26 July 2014 Friendly	VVV	0–2	AZ	(Netherlands) Venlo
	-		Gudelj (yellow card) ?'; Gouweleeuw 83'; Ortiz 90'	Stadium: Seacon Stadion; Referee: Edwin de Graaf

After winning silverware, AZ agreed to play a friendly against German Bundesliga side 1899 Hoffenheim as part of their training camp in Switzerland. The final match of pre-season has been arranged for 1 August on the training field outside AFAS Stadion and will once again feature players from just the AZ squad. This game featured the squad wearing their new kits for the forthcoming season. The white (away) kit was worn by fringe members of the squad and black (away) kits were worn by the reserve and under-19 AZ players. This concluded the pre-season with only eight days remaining until the Eredivisie season opener against Heracles Almelo away.

31 July 2014 Friendly	AZ	0–3	(Germany) 1899 Hoffenheim	(Switzerland) Weggis
	Gouweleeuw (yellow card) ?'; Johansson (yellow card) ?'		Firmino (red card) 25'; Rudy 57'; Modeste 71'; Salihović 88'	Stadium: Thermoplan Arena

1 August 2014 Friendly	AZ Wit (White)	0–0	AZ Zwart (Black)	(Netherlands) Alkmaar
	-		-	Stadium: AFAS Stadion training field

Accurate as of 1 August

=== Statistics ===
Top goalscorers

Rank	Player	(pen.)
1.	(Sweden) Muamer Tanković	7(1)
2.	(Netherlands) Thom Haye	2
2.	(Sweden) Denni Avdić	2
2.	(Norway) Markus Henriksen	2
2.	(Netherlands) Donny Gorter	2 (2)
6.	(Netherlands) Steven Berghuis	1
6.	(Belgium) Jan Wuytens	1
6.	(Sweden) Mattias Johansson	1
6.	(Sweden) Viktor Elm	1
6.	(Netherlands) Mikhail Rosheuvel	1
6.	(Netherlands) Ridgeciano Haps	1
6.	(Netherlands) Djavan Anderson	1
6.	(Netherlands) Joris van Overeem	1
6.	(Netherlands) Jeffrey Gouweleeuw	1
6.	(Paraguay) Celso Ortiz	1
Total		25(3)

Goals conceded

Against	(pen.)	Scorers
(Germany) 1899 Hoffenheim	3	(Germany) Rudy (France) Modeste (Bosnia and Herzegovina) Salihović
(Netherlands) AZ Rood	2(1)	(Sweden) Tankovic (Netherlands) Gorter (pen.)
(Netherlands) SVW’27	1	(Netherlands) Bakker
(Netherlands) AFC '34	1	(Netherlands) Ben Hamed
(Netherlands) AZ Blauw	1	(Netherlands) van Overeem
(Netherlands) NEC	0	-
(Azerbaijan) Qabala	0	-
(Netherlands) VVV	0	-
(Netherlands) AZ Wit	0	-
(Netherlands) AZ Zwart	0	-
Total	8(1)	

Accurate as of 1 August

== Eredivisie ==
The regular domestic league season began with an away fixture in the start of August 2015 to Heracles Almelo and finished away to Excelsior in mid-late May 2015.

9 August 2014 1	Heracles Almelo	0–3	AZ	Almelo
	Fledderus (yellow card) 64'		Berghuis 56'; Hupperts 62'; Tanković 75'	Stadium: Polman Stadion; Attendance: 8,315; Referee: Dennis Higler

17 August 2014 2	AZ	1–3	Ajax	Alkmaar
	Berghuis 50'; Wuytens (yellow card) 75'; Gouweleeuw (yellow card) 90'; Hupperts (yellow card) 90'		Klaassen 15'; Sigþórsson (yellow card) 37'; Schöne 69'; El Ghazi 90'; Moisander (yellow card) 90'	Stadium: AFAS Stadion; Attendance: 16,011; Referee: Kevin Blom

23 August 2014 3	Willem II	3–0	AZ	Tilburg
	Andrade 14'; Messaoud 29'; Ondaan (yellow card) 33'; Vicento 86'	Summary	Wuytens (yellow card) 37'	Stadium: Koning Willem II Stadion; Attendance: 9,500; Referee: (Netherlands) Jochem Kamphuis

30 August 2014 4	Dordrecht	1–3	AZ	Dordrecht
	Gosens (yellow card) 3'; Lieder 53'; Haddad (yellow card) 68'	Summary	Hupperts 6'; Tanković 22'; Gudelj (yellow card) 53'; Berghuis 58'	Stadium: GN Bouw Stadion; Attendance: 4,235; Referee: (Netherlands) Ed Janssen

13 September 2014 5	AZ	0–1	Heerenveen	Alkmaar
	Johansson (yellow card) 67'	Report	Sinkgraven 38', (yellow card) 58'; De Roon (yellow card) 76'	Stadium: AFAS Stadion; Attendance: 15,398; Referee: (Netherlands) Nijhuis

21 September 2014 6	AZ	1–0	PEC Zwolle	Alkmaar
	Luckassen (yellow card) 57'; Henriksen 72'; Hoedt (yellow card) 84'	Report	Reinstra (yellow card) 23'	Stadium: AFAS Stadion; Attendance: 14,748; Referee: (Netherlands) Kuipers

27 September 2014 7	ADO Den Haag	2–3	AZ	The Hague
	Zuiverloon (yellow card) 8'; Kramer 42'; Alberg (yellow card) 58' (goal) 85'	Report	Luckassen (yellow card) 25'; Hupperts (yellow card) 29'; Poulsen 45'; Johansson 67'; Gudelj 83'	Stadium: Kyocera Stadion; Attendance: 10,678; Referee: (Netherlands) Tom van Sichem

5 October 2014 8	AZ	2–2	Twente	Alkmaar
	Mühren 28'; Tanković 84'; Rochet (yellow card) 90'	Summary	Ebecilio 55'; Bjelland (yellow card) 57'; Ziyech 59'; Marsman (yellow card) 83'; Bengtsson (yellow card) 90+1'	Stadium: AFAS Stadion; Attendance: 15,333; Referee: (Netherlands) Reinold Wiedemeijer

18 October 2014 9	PSV	3–0	AZ	Eindhoven
	Narsingh 20'; Maher 29', 41'	L	Luckassen (yellow card) 4'; Elm (yellow card) 47'	Stadium: Philips Stadion; Attendance: 31,400; Referee: (Netherlands) Kuipers

25 October 2014 10	AZ	2–2	Groningen	Alkmaar
	Johansson (yellow card) 57'; Rosheuvel 59'; Gudelj 83'		De Leeuw 10'; Hoesen 52'; Botteghin (yellow card) 58'	Stadium: AFAS Stadion; Attendance: 15,019; Referee: (Netherlands) Pol van Boekel

2 November 2014 11	AZ	3–3	Excelsior	Alkmaar
	Gudelj 33'; Van Diermen 68' (o.g.); Tanković 73'; Johansson (yellow card) 83'	Summary	Kuipers (yellow card) 5'; Auassar 10'; Fischer (yellow card) 39'; Karami 40'; Vermeulen (yellow card) 77'; De Reuver 84'; Bruins (yellow card) 86'	Stadium: AFAS Stadion; Attendance: 15,236; Referee: (Netherlands) Jochem Kamphuis

8 November 2014 12	NAC Breda	0–1	AZ	Breda
	De Kamps (yellow card) 57'	Summary	Gudelj (yellow card) 20', (goal) 57'; Poulsen (yellow card) 81'	Stadium: Rat Verlegh Stadion; Attendance: 18,500; Referee: (Netherlands) Tom van Sichem

22 November 2014 13	AZ	1–0	Vitesse	Alkmaar
	Jóhannsson 14'	Summary	Labyad (yellow card) 65'; Pröpper (yellow card) 87'	Stadium: AFAS Stadion; Attendance: 15,517; Referee: (Netherlands) Nijhuis

29 November 2014 14	Cambuur	0–2	AZ	Leeuwarden
		Report	Gudelj 39' (pen.), 55'	Stadium: Cambuur Stadion; Attendance: 9,843; Referee: (Netherlands) Dennis Higler

6 December 2014 15	AZ	2-0	Go Ahead Eagles	Alkmaar
	Jóhannsson 25'; Johansson (yellow card) 53'; Gudelj (yellow card) 63'; Dos Santos 70'	Summary	Van der Linden (yellow card) 49'; De Sa (yellow card) 89'	Stadium: AFAS Stadion; Attendance: 15,188; Referee: (Netherlands) Pieter Vink

14 December 2014 16	Feyenoord	2–2	AZ	Rotterdam
	Kazim-Richards 53'; Boëtius (yellow card) 58'; Clasie 90+3'	Summary	Hoedt 25'; Haye (yellow card) 28'; Tanković 30'; Alvarado (yellow card) 59'; Gouweleeuw (yellow card) 59'; Haps (yellow card) 88'	Stadium: De Kuip; Attendance: 47,500; Referee: (Netherlands) Serdar Gözübüyük

20 December 2014 17	AZ	0–3	Utrecht	Alkmaar
	Haye (yellow card) 34'; Ortiz (yellow card) 53'	Summary	Duplan 12', 28', (yellow card) 76'; Diemers 37'; Ayoub (yellow card) 66'; Hardeveld (yellow card) 88'	Stadium: AFAS Stadion; Attendance: 14,825; Referee: (Netherlands) Richard Liesveld

17 January 2015 18	AZ	2–0	Dordrecht	Alkmaar
	Poulsen 25'; Gudelj 51'	Summary		Stadium: AFAS Stadion; Attendance: 14,714; Referee: (Netherlands) Bas Nijhuis

24 January 2015 19	PEC Zwolle	1–1	AZ	Zwolle
	Lukoki 15'	Summary	Gudelj 5', (yellow card) 66'; Gouweleeuw (yellow card) 72'; Ortiz (yellow card) 82'	Stadium: IJsseldelta Stadion; Attendance: 12,250; Referee: (Netherlands) Pieter Vink

1 February 2015 20	AZ	3–1	Heracles Almelo	Alkmaar
	Jóhannsson 9'; Hupperts (yellow card) 26'; Haps (yellow card) 46'; Berghuis 54'; Henriksen 88'	Summary	Aktaou (yellow card) 39'; Linssen (yellow card) 44'; Schenkeveld (yellow card) 75'; Darri 81'	Stadium: AFAS Stadion; Attendance: 14,512; Referee: (Netherlands) Björn Kuipers

5 February 2015 21	Ajax	0–1	AZ	Amsterdam
	Moisander (red card) 61'	Summary	Berghuis (yellow card) 43'; Jóhannsson 76'	Stadium: Amsterdam Arena; Attendance: 47,724; Referee: (Netherlands) Pol van Boekel

8 February 2015 22	Groningen	2–4	AZ	Groningen
	Berghuis 8' (o.g.); De Leeuw 37'; Kieftenbeld (yellow card) 62'	Summary	Berghuis 45'; Gouweleeuw 59'; Henriksen 65', 82'; Hoedt (yellow card) 80'	Stadium: Euroborg; Attendance: 18,807; Referee: (Netherlands) Martin van den Kerkhof

13 February 2015 23	AZ	2 – 4	PSV	Alkmaar
	Henriksen 40'; Mühren 49'	Report	de Jong 3', 8', 60'; Wijnaldum 58'; Rekik (yellow card) 14'	Stadium: AFAS Stadion; Attendance: 17,081; Referee: Bas Nijhuis

24	Go Ahead Eagles	v	AZ	Deventer
				Stadium: Adelaarshorst

25	AZ	v	Willem II	Alkmaar
				Stadium: AFAS Stadion

26	Utrecht	v	AZ	Utrecht
				Stadium: Stadion Galgenwaard

27	Vitesse	v	AZ	Arnhem
				Stadium: GelreDome

28	AZ	v	Cambuur	Alkmaar
				Stadium: AFAS Stadion

29	AZ	v	Feyenoord	Alkmaar
				Stadium: AFAS Stadion

30	Heerenveen	v	AZ	Heerenveen
				Stadium: Abe Lenstra Stadion

31	AZ	v	ADO Den Haag	Alkmaar
				Stadium: AFAS Stadion

32	Twente	v	AZ	Enschede
				Stadium: De Grolsch Veste

33	AZ	v	NAC Breda	Alkmaar
				Stadium: AFAS Stadion

34	Excelsior	v	AZ	Rotterdam
				Stadium: Stadion Woudestein

=== Statistics ===
Top goalscorers

Rank	Player	(pen.)
1.	(Netherlands) Steven Berghuis	3
2=	(Netherlands) Guus Hupperts	2
2=	(Sweden) Muamer Tanković	2
Total		7

Goals conceded

Against	Goal	Scorers
(Netherlands) Ajax	3	(Netherlands) Davy Klaassen (Denmark) Lasse Schöne (Netherlands) Anwar El Ghazi
(Netherlands) Willem II	3	(Brazil) Bruno Andrade (Netherlands) Ali Messaoud (Netherlands) Charlton Vicento
(Netherlands) Dordrecht	1	(Netherlands) Mart Lieder
(Netherlands) Heracles Almelo	0	-
(Netherlands) Heerenveen	-	-
(Netherlands) PEC Zwolle	-	-
(Netherlands) ADO Den Haag	-	-
(Netherlands) Twente	-	-
(Netherlands) PSV	-	-
(Netherlands) Groningen	-	-
(Netherlands) Excelsior	-	-
(Netherlands) NAC	-	-
(Netherlands) Vitesse	-	-
(Netherlands) Cambuur	-	-
(Netherlands) Go Ahead Eagles	-	-
(Netherlands) Feyenoord	-	-
(Netherlands) Utrecht	-	-
Total	7	

==== League table ====
Pos	Team	Pld	W	D	L	GF	GA	GD	Pts	Qualification or relegation
1	PSV (C)	34	29	1	4	92	31	+61	88	Qualification for the Champions League group stage
2	Ajax	34	21	8	5	69	29	+40	71	Qualification for the Champions League third qualifying round
3	AZ	34	19	5	10	63	56	+7	62	Qualification for the Europa League third qualifying round
4	Feyenoord	34	17	8	9	56	39	+17	59	Qualification for the European competition play-offs
5	Vitesse (O)	34	16	10	8	66	43	+23	58	Qualification for the European competition play-offs

Source: NUsport
Rules for classification: 1) points; 2) goal difference; 3) number of goals scored
(C) Champions; (O) Play-off winners

== KNVB Cup ==
AZ were drawn against the winners of the first round match on 27 August 2014 between Limburg amateurs EVV and Spirit'30, amateurs from Hoogkarspel for the second round of the KNVB Cup. EVV were victorious in the match, winning 4–0, and AZ will visit the 2,000 capacity Sportpark "In de Bandert" on 24 September 2014.

24 September 2014 Round 2	EVV	0–1	AZ	Echt-Susteren
		Summary	Haye 27'	Stadium: Sportpark "In de Bandert"; Attendance: 2,124; Referee: (Netherlands) Dennis Higler

29 October 2014 Round 3	GVVV	0–5	AZ	Veenendaal
		Summary	Gudelj 9'; Gouweleeuw 17'; Elm 80'; Mühren 82'; Rosheuvel 90'	Stadium: Sportpark Panhuis; Attendance: 3,000; Referee: (Netherlands) Martin van den Kerkhof

17 December 2014 Round of 16	AZ	2–1	NEC	Alkmaar
	Tanković 33', 62' (pen.); Haye (yellow card) 90+2'	Summary	Santos (yellow card) 38'; Daemen (yellow card) 62'; Limbombe 66'	Stadium: AFAS Stadion; Attendance: 8,066; Referee: (Netherlands) Tom van Sichem

27 January 2015 Quarter-final	Twente	3–0	AZ	Enschede
	Castaignos 24'; Ziyech 44', 62'	Summary	Ortiz (yellow card) 13'; Poulsen (yellow card) 38'; Gouweleeuw (yellow card) 66'	Stadium: De Grolsch Veste; Attendance: 18,600; Referee: (Netherlands) Kevin Blom

=== Statistics ===
Top goalscorers

Rank	Player	(pen.)
1.	(Isle of Man)	-(-)
Total		-(-)

Goals conceded

Against	(pen.)	Scorers
(Netherlands) EVV	-	(Isle of Man) -
Total	-(-)	

== Squad Performance ==
Player	League starts	(pen.)	Substituted off	Substituted on	Unused sub.	Cup starts	(pen.)	Substituted off	Substituted on	Unused sub.
01. (Costa Rica) Esteban Alvarado	3	-6	0	0	0	0	0	0	0	0
02. (Sweden) Mattias Johansson	3	0	1	0	1	0	0	0	0	0
03. (Netherlands) Jeffrey Gouweleeuw	4	0	0	0	0	0	0	0	0	0
04. (Belgium) Jan Wuytens	4	0	0	0	0	0	0	0	0	0
06. (Paraguay) Celso Ortiz	4	0	0	0	0	0	0	0	0	0
07. (Netherlands) Guus Hupperts	4	2	1	0	0	0	0	0	0	0
08. (Serbia) Nemanja Gudelj (c)	4	0	0	0	0	0	0	0	0	0
09. (United States) Aron Jóhannsson	0	0	0	0	0	0	0	0	0	0
10. (Norway) Markus Henriksen	3	0	1	0	0	0	0	0	0	0
11. (Sweden) Muamer Tanković	4	2	3	0	0	0	0	0	0	0
12. (Sweden) Viktor Elm	0	0	0	3	1	0	0	0	0	0
14. (Netherlands) Wesley Hoedt	0	0	0	0	4	0	0	0	0	0
15. (Denmark) Simon Poulsen	4	0	0	0	0	0	0	0	0	0
17. (Netherlands) Djavan Anderson	0	0	0	0	0	0	0	0	0	0
18. (Netherlands) Mikhail Rosheuvel	1	0	1	2	1	0	0	0	0	0
19. (Australia) Eli Babalj	0	0	0	0	0	0	0	0	0	0
20. (Netherlands) Thom Haye	1	0	0	1	2	0	0	0	0	0
21. (Netherlands) Robert Mühren	0	0	0	1	0	0	0	0	0	0
22. (Netherlands) Steven Berghuis	3	3	1	0	0	0	0	0	0	0
23. (Netherlands) Derrick Luckassen	1	0	1	0	3	0	0	0	0	0
24. (Netherlands) Ridgeciano Haps	0	0	0	2	2	0	0	0	0	0
25. (Uruguay) Sergio Rochet	1	-1	0	0	3	0	0	0	0	0
16. (Belgium) Yves De Winter	0	0	0	0	1	0	0	0	0	0

Squad Numbers

=== Loanees ===
==== Domestic ====
Player	Team	League starts	(pen.)	Substituted off	Substituted on	Unused sub.	Cup starts	(pen.)	Substituted off	Substituted on	Unused sub.
(Netherlands) Joris van Overeem	Dordrecht	4	1	1	0	0	0	0	0	0	0
(Belgium) Jonas Heymans	Willem II	4	0	0	0	0	0	0	0	0	0
(Sweden) Denni Avdić	Heracles Almelo	3	1	2	0	0	0	0	0	0	0
(Netherlands) Fernando Lewis	Go Ahead Eagles	0	0	0	4	0	0	0	0	0	0

==== Foreign ====
Player	Team	League XI	(pen.)	Substituted off	Substituted on	Unused sub.	League Cup XI	(pen.)	Substituted off	Substituted on	Unused sub.	European Competition XI	(pen.)	Substituted off	Substituted on
(Netherlands) Donny Gorter	(Denmark) Aalborg BK	0	0	0	0	0	0	0	0	0	0	0	0	0	0

Accurate as of matchday four.

== International appearances ==
The following first team players played for their respective nations during the 2014–15 season:

Player	National Team	Position	Time Played	Goals
-	-	-	-	-

== UEFA current ranking ==
As of 04/07/2014

Rank	Country	Team	Points
34	(Turkey)	Galatasaray	47.980
35	(Ukraine)	Dynamo Kyiv	47.166
36	(Netherlands)	AZ	45.612
37	(Italy)	Lazio	45.568
38	(Spain)	Athletic Bilbao	43.299

== Recent Eredivisie results ==
7	13	10	10	5	3	2	3	11	1	5	4	10	8
00	01	02	03	04	05	06	07	08	09	10	11	12	13	14
