= 2015–16 AZ Alkmaar season =

AZ Alkmaar
- Full name: Alkmaar Zaanstreek

AZ Alkmaar
2015/16 season
- Chairman: René Neelissen
- Manager: John van den Brom
- Ground: AFAS Stadion
- Eredivisie: 4th
- KNVB Cup: Semi-final
- Europa League: Group stage
Home colours

During the 2015–16 season AZ competed in the Eredivisie for the 18th consecutive season the KNVB Cup and the Europa League after qualifying for the 3rd qualification round due to finishing 3rd the previous season.

== Background ==
European football returned after a one-year hiatus. John van den Brom finished third last season with Marco van Basten his assistant. Several key players moved elsewhere including captain Nemanja Gudelj and fan favourite Simon Poulsen.

Several youth players were promoted to the first team the same year the club won the Rinus Michels award for best youth academy and youth development programme in the Netherlands, beating Feyenoord who won this award each of the five preceding years.

== Transfers ==
=== Arrivals ===
- The following players moved to AZ.

| | Name | Position | Previous club | Fee | Date |
|---|---|---|---|---|---|
| Substituted on | (Netherlands) Joris van Overeem | CM | (Netherlands) Dordrecht | Return from loan | June 2015 |
| Substituted on | (Netherlands) Fernando Lewis | LW | (Netherlands) Dordrecht | Return from loan | June 2015 |
| Substituted on | (Netherlands) Raymond Gyasi | RW | (Netherlands) Roda JC | Return from loan | June 2015 |
| Substituted on | (Sweden) Denni Avdic | ST | (Netherlands) Heracles | Return from loan | June 2015 |
| Substituted on | (Australia) Eli Babalj | ST | (Netherlands) PEC | Return from loan | June 2015 |
| Substituted on | (Belgium) Jonas Heymans | LB | (Netherlands) Willem II | Return from loan | June 2015 |
| Substituted on | (Netherlands) Jop van der Linden | LB | (Netherlands) Go Ahead Eagles | Free | June 2015 |
| Substituted on | (Netherlands) Gino Coutinho | GK | (Netherlands) Excelsior Rotterdam | Free | June 2015 |
| Substituted on | (Trinidad and Tobago) Levi García | FW | (Trinidad and Tobago) Central FC | Undisclosed | June 2015 |
| Substituted on | (Netherlands) Vincent Janssen | CF | (Netherlands) Almere City | €100,000 | June 2015 |
| Substituted on | (Iran) Alireza Jahanbakhsh | FW | (Netherlands) N.E.C. | Undisclosed | August 2015 |
| Substituted on | (Serbia) Rajko Brežančić | LB | (Serbia) FK Čukarički | Undisclosed | August 2015 |

=== Departures ===
- The following players moved from AZ.

| | Name | Position | New club | Fee | Date |
|---|---|---|---|---|---|
| Substituted off | (Serbia) Nemanja Gudelj | CM | (Netherlands) Ajax | €6 million | June 2015 |
| Substituted off | (Netherlands) Wesley Hoedt | CB | (Italy) Lazio | Compensation | June 2015 |
| Substituted off | (Denmark) Simon Poulsen | LB | (Netherlands) PSV | Free | June 2015 |
| Substituted off | (Costa Rica) Esteban Alvarado | GK | Unattached | Free | June 2015 |
| Substituted off | (Belgium) Yves de Winter | GK | (Belgium) Sint-Truidense V.V. | Free | June 2015 |
| Substituted off | (Netherlands) Steven Berghuis | FW | (England) Watford F.C. | undisclosed | July 2015 |
| Substituted off | (United States) Aron Jóhannsson | ST | (Germany) Werder Bremen | €5 million | August 2015 |

=== Loans ===
- The following players moved to new clubs whilst under contract at AZ.

| | Name | Position | New club | Loan period |
|---|---|---|---|---|
| Substituted off | (Australia) Eli Babalj | CF | (Australia) Adelaide United | 30/06/2017 |

== Pre-season friendlies ==
The first training session for the new season began on 28 June. Friendlies were arranged with smaller teams in the Netherlands as well as two additional friendlies against foreign teams touring the Netherlands. A training camp was also arranged the week before competitive football in the Europa League by 30 July.

| 4 July 2015 | Dirkshorn Regional Selection XI | 2-7 | AZ | Dirkshorn |
| | De Bruin 26' De Bruin 44' | | van Overeem 32' Janssen 54'; Janssen 74'; Gyasi 81'; Janssen 86'; Lewis 87'; Lewis 90+1' | Stadium: Sportcomplex De Veersloot; Referee: Luca Cantineau |

| 8 July 2015 | AFC '34 | 1-8 | AZ | Robonsbosweg, Alkmaar |
| | Inecia 45' | | Janssen 5'; Janssen 19' van Overeem 22'; Janssen 27'; Van der Linden 38'(pen.) Mühren 46'; Helmer 78'; Helmer 88' | Stadium: Gemeentelijk Sportpark; Referee: Sander Brito de Roque |

| 11 July 2015 | Fortuna Sittard | 0-5 | AZ | Sittard |
| | | | Janssen 35'; Dos Santos 44'; Janssen 52'; Van Overeem 55'; Luckassen 79' | Stadium: Offermans Joosten Stadion; Referee: Jeroen Sanders |

| 14 July 2015 | AZ | 3-1 | (Scotland) Dundee United | Dirkshorn |
| | Henriksen 21' Luckassen 56'; Gouweleeuw 78'(pen.) | | Spittal 28' | Stadium: Sportpark Veersloot; Referee: Danny Makkelie |

| 18 July 2015 | AZ | 3-0 | SC Telstar | Alkmaar |
| | Janssen 24'; Luckassen 50'; Janssen 66' | | | Stadium: AFAS Stadion; Referee: Martin van den Kerkhof |

| 24 July 2015 | AZ | 1-0 | (United Arab Emirates) Al Wasl | Putten |
| | Mühren 75' | | | Stadium: Sportpark Puttereng; Referee: Steven van der Vrande |

=== Statistics ===
Top goalscorers

| Rank | Player | (pen.) |
|---|---|---|
| 1. | (Netherlands) Janssen | 10 |
| 2= | (Netherlands) van Overeem (Netherlands) Luckassen | 3 |
| =4. | (Netherlands) Lewis (Netherlands) Helmer (Netherlands) Mühren | 2 |
| =7. | (Netherlands) Gyasi (Netherlands) Dos Santos (Norway) Henriksen (Netherlands) Van der Linden (Netherlands) Gouweleeuw | 1; 1; 1; 0(1); 0(1) |
| Total; Total inc. pen. | | 25 (2); 27 |

Goals conceded

| Against | Scorers | (pen.) |
|---|---|---|
| (Netherlands) Dirkshorn Regional Selection XI | (Netherlands) De Bruin x2 | 2 |
| (Netherlands) AFC '34 | (Netherlands) Inecia | 1 |
| (Netherlands) Fortuna Sittard | NA | 0 |
| (Scotland) Dundee United | (Scotland) Spittal | 1 |
| (Netherlands) SC Telstar | NA | 0 |
| (United Arab Emirates) Al Wasl | NA | 0 |
| Total | | 4 |

== Europa League ==
AZ qualified for the 3rd qualification round of the Europa League after finishing the league in 3rd position in the previous season. Due to previous runs in the competition, the club had a high coefficient and was seeded for the draw meaning a favourable draw against weaker opposition was likely. The first game was scheduled for 30 July with the return leg on 6 August.

| 30 July 2015 Europa League Third Qualifying Round, First Leg | AZ | 2-0 | (Turkey) İstanbul Başakşehir | Alkmaar |
| | Van der Linden 17'(pen.); Janssen 63' | | (red card) Babacan (GK) | Stadium: AFAS Stadion; Attendance: 11,723; Referee: Kevin Clancy |

| 6 August 2015 Europa League Third Qualifying Round, Second Leg | (Turkey) İstanbul Başakşehir | 1 - 2 (1 - 4 agg.) | AZ | Başakşehir, Istanbul |
| | Doka Madureira 45'; Gençer Cansev (yellow card) 74' | Summary | Henriksen 21'; Johansson (yellow card) 74' van Overeem 75' | Stadium: Başakşehir Fatih Terim Stadium; Attendance: 5,289; Referee: (Spain) Carlos Clos Gómez |

| 20 August 2015 Europa League Play off, First Leg | (Romania) Astra Giurgiu | 3 - 2 | (Netherlands) AZ | Giurgiu |
| | Fernando Boldrin 25'; Oros (yellow card) 30'; Alibec 41'; Dandea 45+3'; Enache (yellow card) 52'; Pedro Queirós (yellow card) 72' | Summary | van Overeem (yellow card) 9'; Henriksen 11' (yellow card) 22'; Janssen 13'; Luckassen (yellow card) 40'; Johansson (yellow card) 73' | Stadium: Stadionul Marin Anastasovici; Attendance: 3,712; Referee: (Slovenia) Slavko Vinčić |

=== Statistics ===
Top goalscorers

| Rank | Player | (pen.) |
|---|---|---|
| =1. | (Netherlands) Janssen (Netherlands) Van der Linden | 1; 0(1) |
| Total; Total inc. pen. | | 1 (1); 2 |

Goals conceded

| Against | Scorers | (pen.) |
|---|---|---|
| (Turkey) İstanbul Başakşehir | | |
| Total; Total inc. pen. | | |

== Eredivisie ==
| 9 August 2015 Eredivisie Matchday 1 | AZ | v | Ajax | Alkmaar |
| | | | | Stadium: AFAS Stadion |

| 15 August 2015 Eredivisie Matchday 2 | Excelsior | v | AZ | Rotterdam |
| | | | | Stadium: Stadion Woudestein |

| 15 August 2015 Eredivisie Matchday 3 | AZ | v | Willem II | Alkmaar |
| | | | | Stadium: AFAS Stadion |

| 30 August 2015 Eredivisie Matchday 4 | AZ | v | Roda JC | Alkmaar |
| | | | | Stadium: AFAS Stadion |

| 12 September 2015 Eredivisie Matchday 5 | De Graafschap | v | AZ | Doetinchem |
| | | | | Stadium: De Vijverberg |

| 20 September 2015 Eredivisie Matchday 6 | Groningen | v | AZ | Groningen |
| | | | | Stadium: Euroborg |

| 26 September 2015 Eredivisie Matchday 7 | AZ | v | Heracles | Alkmaar |
| | | | | Stadium: AFAS Stadion |

| 4 October 2015 Eredivisie Matchday 8 | AZ | v | Twente | Alkmaar |
| | | | | Stadium: AFAS Stadion |

| 4 October 2015 Eredivisie Matchday 9 | Cambuur | v | AZ | Leeuwarden |
| | | | | Stadium: Cambuur Stadion |

| 25 October 2015 Eredivisie Matchday 10 | Feyenoord | v | AZ | Rotterdam |
| | | | | Stadium: De Kuip |

| 1 November 2015 Eredivisie Matchday 11 | AZ | v | NEC | Alkmaar |
| | | | | Stadium: AFAS Stadion |

| 8 November 2015 Eredivisie Matchday 12 | Vitesse | v | AZ | Arnhem |
| | | | | Stadium: GelreDome |

| 21 November 2015 Eredivisie Matchday 13 | AZ | v | Heerenveen | Alkmaar |
| | | | | Stadium: AFAS Stadion |

| 29 November 2015 Eredivisie Matchday 14 | PSV | v | AZ | Eindhoven |
| | | | | Stadium: Philips Stadion |

| 4 December 2015 Eredivisie Matchday 15 | AZ | v | ADO | Alkmaar |
| | | | | Stadium: AFAS Stadion |

| 13 December 2015 Eredivisie Matchday 16 | PEC | v | AZ | Zwolle |
| | | | | Stadium: IJsseldelta Stadion |

| 19 December 2015 Eredivisie Matchday 17 | AZ | v | Utrecht | Alkmaar |
| | | | | Stadium: AFAS Stadion |

| Winter Break | v | 22 December 2015 - 14 January 2016 |

| 16 January 2016 Eredivisie Matchday 18 | Roda JC | v | AZ | Kerkrade |
| | | | | Stadium: Parkstad Limburg Stadion |

| 24 January 2016 Eredivisie Matchday 19 | AZ | v | Feyenoord | Alkmaar |
| | | | | Stadium: AFAS Stadion |

| 27 January 2016 Eredivisie Matchday 20 | AZ | v | Cambuur | Alkmaar |
| | | | | Stadium: AFAS Stadion |

| 30 January 2016 Eredivisie Matchday 21 | NEC | v | AZ | Nijmegen |
| | | | | Stadium: Goffertstadion |

| 6 February 2016 Eredivisie Matchday 22 | AZ | v | Vitesse | Alkmaar |
| | | | | Stadium: AFAS Stadion |

| 13 February 2016 Eredivisie Matchday 23 | Heracles | v | AZ | Almelo |
| | | | | Stadium: Polman Stadion |

| 20 February 2016 Eredivisie Matchday 24 | AZ | v | Groningen | Alkmaar |
| | | | | Stadium: AFAS Stadion |

| 28 February 2016 Eredivisie Matchday 25 | Ajax | v | AZ | Amsterdam |
| | | | | Stadium: Amsterdam ArenA |

| 5 March 2016 Eredivisie Matchday 26 | AZ | v | Excelsior | Alkmaar |
| | | | | Stadium: AFAS Stadion |

| 12 March 2016 Eredivisie Matchday 27 | Willem II | v | AZ | Limburg |
| | | | | Stadium: Koning Willem II Stadion |

| 20 March 2016 Eredivisie Matchday 28 | Twente | v | AZ | Enschede |
| | | | | Stadium: De Grolsch Veste |

| 2 April 2016 Eredivisie Matchday 29 | AZ | v | PSV | Alkmaar |
| | | | | Stadium: AFAS Stadion |

| 10 April 2016 Eredivisie Matchday 30 | Heerenveen | v | AZ | Heerenveen |
| | | | | Stadium: Abe Lenstra Stadion |

| 16 April 2016 Eredivisie Matchday 31 | AZ | v | PEC | Alkmaar |
| | | | | Stadium: AFAS Stadion |

| 20 April 2016 Eredivisie Matchday 32 | ADO | v | AZ | The Hague |
| | | | | Stadium: Kyocera Stadion |

| 1 May 2016 Eredivisie Matchday 33 | AZ | v | De Graafschap | Alkmaar |
| | | | | Stadium: AFAS Stadion |

| 8 May 2016 Eredivisie Matchday 34 | Utrecht | v | AZ | Rotterdam |
| | | | | Stadium: Stadion Galgenwaard |

=== Statistics ===
Top goalscorers

| Rank | Player | (pen.) |
|---|---|---|
| 1. | | |
| Total | | |

Goals conceded

| Against | Scorers | (pen.) |
|---|---|---|
| Total | | |

==== League table ====
| Pos | Team | Pld | W | D | L | GF | GA | GD | Pts | Qualification or relegation |
|---|---|---|---|---|---|---|---|---|---|---|
| 2 | Ajax | 34 | 25 | 7 | 2 | 81 | 21 | +60 | 82 | Qualification for the Champions League third qualifying round |
| 3 | Feyenoord | 34 | 19 | 6 | 9 | 62 | 40 | +22 | 63 | Qualification for the Europa League group stage (Note: Feyenoord qualified for the Europa League group stage by winning the 2015–16 KNVB Cup.) |
| 4 | AZ | 34 | 18 | 5 | 11 | 70 | 53 | +17 | 59 | Qualification for the Europa League third qualifying round |
| 5 | Utrecht | 34 | 15 | 8 | 11 | 57 | 48 | +9 | 53 | Qualification for the European competition play-offs (Note: Four teams played for one spot in the UEFA Europa League third qualifying round.) |
| 6 | Heracles Almelo (O) | 34 | 14 | 9 | 11 | 47 | 49 | −2 | 51 | Qualification for the European competition play-offs |

Source: Eredivisie, NUsport, Soccerway
Rules for classification: 1) Points; 2) Goal difference; 3) Goals scored; 4) Head-to-head points; 5) Head-to-head goal difference; 6) Head-to-head away goals scored; 7) Play-off (only if deciding champion, European competitions, or relegation); 8) Draw.
(O) Play-off winners

== KNVB Cup ==
| 23 September 2015 Second round | AZ | 6–1 | VVV-Venlo | Alkmaar |
| | van der Linden 8' (pen.); Tanković 37' 82'; Mühren 70'; Henriksen 78' 80' | Summary | Kristiaan Haagen (red card) 7'; Kruijsen (yellow card) 13'; Fleuren (yellow card) 48' van Crooy 69' | Stadium: AFAS Stadion; Attendance: 7,188; Referee: (Netherlands) Richard Liesveld |

| 29 October 2015 Third round | Telstar | 0–1 | AZ | Velsen |
| | Zonneveld (yellow card) 78'; Serrarens (yellow card) 83' van Berkel (yellow card) 85' | Summary | van Overeem 68'; Haye (yellow card) 83'; Ortiz (yellow card) 90' | Stadium: Telstar Stadion; Attendance: 3,200; Referee: (Netherlands) Dennis Higler |

| 16 December 2015 Round of 16 | Kozakken Boys | 1–3 | AZ | Werkendam |
| | Jesper Hogedoorn (red card) 39'; Tecleab (yellow card) 58'; Grot (yellow card) 67'; Bryan Jongeneel 72'; Quentin Jacoba (yellow card) 83' | Summary | Gouweleeuw 41' (pen.) 83' (pen.); Luckassen (yellow card) 67'; Haye (yellow card) 73'; Mühren 88' | Stadium: Sportpark De Zwaaier; Attendance: 4,000; Referee: (Netherlands) Siemen Mulder |

| 2 February 2016 Quarter-finals | AZ | 1–0 | HHC Hardenberg | Alkmaar |
| | Janssen 8'; García (yellow card) 59'; Henriksen (yellow card) 82' | Summary | Koos Werkman (yellow card) 40'; Stijn Pol (yellow card) 86' | Stadium: AFAS Stadion; Attendance: 7,623; Referee: (Netherlands) Pol van Boekel |

| 3 March 2016 Semi-finals | Feyenoord | 3–1 | AZ | Rotterdam |
| | Henriksen 15' (o.g.); Toornstra (yellow card) 58'; Kramer 78'; Kuyt 85' (pen.); Elia (yellow card) 86' | Summary | Luckassen (yellow card) 1'; Henriksen 46' van Overeem (yellow card) 89' | Stadium: De Kuip; Attendance: 47,500; Referee: (Netherlands) Danny Makkelie |

=== Statistics ===
Top goalscorers

| Rank | Player | (pen.) |
|---|---|---|
| 1. | | |
| Total | | |

Goals conceded

| Against | Scorers | (pen.) |
|---|---|---|
| Total | | |

== Squad Performance ==
| Player | League starts | (pen.) | Substituted off | Substituted on | Cup starts | (pen.) | Substituted off | Substituted on | European starts | (pen.) | Substituted off | Substituted on |
Goalkeepers
| 01. (Uruguay) Sergio Rochet | 0 | 0 | 0 | 0 | 0 | 0 | 0 | 0 | 0 | 0 | 0 | 0 |
| 16. (Netherlands) Gino Coutinho | 0 | 0 | 0 | 0 | 0 | 0 | 0 | 0 | 0 | 0 | 0 | 0 |
| 25. (Netherlands) Nick Olij | 0 | 0 | 0 | 0 | 0 | 0 | 0 | 0 | 0 | 0 | 0 | 0 |
Defenders
| 02. (Sweden) Mattias Johansson | 0 | 0 | 0 | 0 | 0 | 0 | 0 | 0 | 0 | 0 | 0 | 0 |
| 03. (Netherlands) Jeffrey Gouweleeuw | 0 | 0 | 0 | 0 | 0 | 0 | 0 | 0 | 0 | 0 | 0 | 0 |
| 04. (Belgium) Jan Wuytens | 0 | 0 | 0 | 0 | 0 | 0 | 0 | 0 | 0 | 0 | 0 | 0 |
| 05. (Serbia) Rajko Brežančić | 0 | 0 | 0 | 0 | 0 | 0 | 0 | 0 | 0 | 0 | 0 | 0 |
| 14. (Netherlands) Jop van der Linden | 0 | 0 | 0 | 0 | 0 | 0 | 0 | 0 | 0 | 0 | 0 | 0 |
| 15. (Netherlands) Donny Gorter | 0 | 0 | 0 | 0 | 0 | 0 | 0 | 0 | 0 | 0 | 0 | 0 |
| 17. (Netherlands) Djavan Anderson | 0 | 0 | 0 | 0 | 0 | 0 | 0 | 0 | 0 | 0 | 0 | 0 |
| 23. (Netherlands) Derrick Luckassen | 0 | 0 | 0 | 0 | 0 | 0 | 0 | 0 | 0 | 0 | 0 | 0 |
| 24. (Netherlands) Ridgeciano Haps | 0 | 0 | 0 | 0 | 0 | 0 | 0 | 0 | 0 | 0 | 0 | 0 |
| 33. (Greece) Pantelis Hatzidiakos | 0 | 0 | 0 | 0 | 0 | 0 | 0 | 0 | 0 | 0 | 0 | 0 |
| 34. (Netherlands) Joris Kramer | 0 | 0 | 0 | 0 | 0 | 0 | 0 | 0 | 0 | 0 | 0 | 0 |
Midfielders
| 06. (Paraguay) Celso Ortiz | 0 | 0 | 0 | 0 | 0 | 0 | 0 | 0 | 0 | 0 | 0 | 0 |
| 08. (Netherlands) Joris van Overeem | 0 | 0 | 0 | 0 | 0 | 0 | 0 | 0 | 0 | 0 | 0 | 0 |
| 10. (Norway) Markus Henriksen | 0 | 0 | 0 | 0 | 0 | 0 | 0 | 0 | 0 | 0 | 0 | 0 |
| 19. (Netherlands) Dabney dos Santos | 0 | 0 | 0 | 0 | 0 | 0 | 0 | 0 | 0 | 0 | 0 | 0 |
| 20. (Netherlands) Thom Haye | 0 | 0 | 0 | 0 | 0 | 0 | 0 | 0 | 0 | 0 | 0 | 0 |
| 26. (Netherlands) Stijn Spierings | 0 | 0 | 0 | 0 | 0 | 0 | 0 | 0 | 0 | 0 | 0 | 0 |
| 36. (Iceland) Alexander Sigurdarson | 0 | 0 | 0 | 0 | 0 | 0 | 0 | 0 | 0 | 0 | 0 | 0 |
| 38. (Netherlands) Thomas Ouwejan | 0 | 0 | 0 | 0 | 0 | 0 | 0 | 0 | 0 | 0 | 0 | 0 |
| 40. (Netherlands) Jeremy Helmer | 0 | 0 | 0 | 0 | 0 | 0 | 0 | 0 | 0 | 0 | 0 | 0 |
Attackers
| 07. (Netherlands) Guus Hupperts | 0 | 0 | 0 | 0 | 0 | 0 | 0 | 0 | 0 | 0 | 0 | 0 |
| 09. (Iran) Alireza Jahanbakhsh | 0 | 0 | 0 | 0 | 0 | 0 | 0 | 0 | 0 | 0 | 0 | 0 |
| 11. (Sweden) Muamer Tankovic | 0 | 0 | 0 | 0 | 0 | 0 | 0 | 0 | 0 | 0 | 0 | 0 |
| 12. (Netherlands) Vincent Janssen | 0 | 0 | 0 | 0 | 0 | 0 | 0 | 0 | 0 | 0 | 0 | 0 |
| 21. (Netherlands) Robert Mühren | 0 | 0 | 0 | 0 | 0 | 0 | 0 | 0 | 0 | 0 | 0 | 0 |
| 22. (Netherlands) Achille Vaarnold | 0 | 0 | 0 | 0 | 0 | 0 | 0 | 0 | 0 | 0 | 0 | 0 |
| 27. (Netherlands) Raymond Gyasi | 0 | 0 | 0 | 0 | 0 | 0 | 0 | 0 | 0 | 0 | 0 | 0 |
| 28. (Trinidad and Tobago) Levi García | 0 | 0 | 0 | 0 | 0 | 0 | 0 | 0 | 0 | 0 | 0 | 0 |
| 29. (Netherlands) Fernando Lewis | 0 | 0 | 0 | 0 | 0 | 0 | 0 | 0 | 0 | 0 | 0 | 0 |

== International Appearances ==
The following first team players either played or were involved for their respective national teams during the season:

=== Toulon Tournament ===
Three players were involved in this invitational tournament for youth teams throughout the world and all played for the Netherlands under 21s or Jong Oranje. The Netherlands team failed to progress from the group stages after two wins and two draws; France and The United States of America progressed from group A.

| Date | National Team | Player | Opposition | Appearances | Goals | Result |
|---|---|---|---|---|---|---|
| 27 May 2015 | (Netherlands) U21 | 3.Derrick Luckassen | (Costa Rica) U23 | 1 | 0 | U21 (Netherlands) 3-2 (Costa Rica) U23 |
| 27 May 2015 | (Netherlands) U21 | 8.Thom Haye | (Costa Rica) U23 | 1 | 0 | U21 (Netherlands) 3-2 (Costa Rica) U23 |
| 27 May 2015 | (Netherlands) U21 | 10.Joris van Overeem | (Costa Rica) U23 | 1 | 0 | U21 (Netherlands) 3-2 (Costa Rica) U23 |
| 29 May 2015 | (Netherlands) U21 | 10.Joris van Overeem | (United States) U23 | 1 | 0 | U21 (Netherlands) 1-3 (United States) U23 |
| 31 May 2015 | (Netherlands) U21 | 3.Derrick Luckassen | (Qatar) U23 | 1 | 0 | U21 (Netherlands) 5-1 (Qatar) U23 |
| 31 May 2015 | (Netherlands) U21 | 8.Thom Haye | (Qatar) U23 | 1 | 0 | U21 (Netherlands) 5-1 (Qatar) U23 |
| 4 June 2015 | (Netherlands) U21 | 3.Derrick Luckassen | (France) U21 | 1 | 0 | U21 (Netherlands) 0-4 (France) U21 |
| 4 June 2015 | (Netherlands) U21 | 8.Thom Haye | (France) U21 | 1 | 0 | U21 (Netherlands) 0-4 (France) U21 |
| 4 June 2015 | (Netherlands) U21 | 10.Joris van Overeem | (France) U21 | 1 | 0 | U21 (Netherlands) 0-4 (France) U21 |

=== Gold Cup ===
Aron Jóhannsson is the only internationalist from the CONCACAF association eligible to play in this tournament.

| Date | National Team | Player | Opposition | Appearances | Goals | Result |
|---|---|---|---|---|---|---|
| 8 July 2015 | (United States) | 9.Aron Jóhannsson | (Honduras) | 0 | 0 | (United States) 2-1 (Honduras) |
| 11 July 2015 | (United States) | 9.Aron Jóhannsson | (Haiti) | 1 | 0 | (United States) 1-0 (Haiti) |
| 14 July 2015 | (United States) | 9.Aron Jóhannsson | (Panama) | - | - | (Panama) x-x (United States) |

=== EURO 2016 Qualification ===
| Date | National Team | Player | Opposition | Appearances | Goals | Result |
|---|---|---|---|---|---|---|
| 12 June 2015 | (Netherlands) | 17.Steven Berghuis | (Latvia) | 0 | 0 | (Latvia) 0-2 (Netherlands) |

=== Friendlies ===
| Date | National Team | Player | Opposition | Appearances | Goals | Result |
|---|---|---|---|---|---|---|
| 5 June 2015 | (United States) | 9.Aron Jóhannsson | (Netherlands) | 1 | 0 | (Netherlands) 3-4 (United States) |
| 5 June 2015 | (Netherlands) | 17.Steven Berghuis | (United States) | 0 | 0 | (Netherlands) 3-4 (United States) |
| 10 June 2015 | (United States) | 9.Aron Jóhannsson | (Germany) | 1 | 0 | (Germany) 1-2 (United States) |
| 4 July 2015 | (United States) | 9.Aron Jóhannsson | (Guatemala) | 0 | 0 | (United States) 4-0 (Guatemala) |

== UEFA Ranking ==
After the 2014-15 season where AZ did not compete in European competitions the club fell 8 places to 44th.

This places the club in third place overall in domestic terms: Ajax (26) lead PSV (30) following AZ (44), FC Twente (45) and Feyenoord (95).

| Rank | Country | Team | Points |
|---|---|---|---|
| 42 | (England) | Liverpool | 47.078 |
| 43 | (Ukraine) | Metalist Kharkiv | 47.033 |
| 44 | (Netherlands) | AZ | 45.612 |
| 45 | (Netherlands) | Twente | 43.695 |
| 46 | (Italy) | Roma | 43.602 |

As of 28/05/2015
