= 2013 Johan Cruyff Shield =

Johan Cruijff Schaal XVIII
AZ	Ajax
2	3
- After extra time
- Date: 27 July 2013
- Venue: Amsterdam Arena, Amsterdam
- Referee: Richard Liesveld
- Attendance: 47,000

The 2013 Johan Cruyff Shield was the eighteenth edition of the Johan Cruyff Shield (Dutch: Johan Cruijff Schaal), an annual Dutch football match played between the winners of the previous season's Eredivisie and KNVB Cup. The match was contested by AZ, the 2012–13 KNVB Cup winners, and Ajax, champions of the 2012–13 Eredivisie. It was held at the Amsterdam Arena on 27 July 2013. Ajax won the match 3–2 after extra time.

== Match details ==
27 July 2013

AZ	2–3 (a.e.t.)	Ajax
Guðmundsson 51'; Jóhannsson 67'	Report	Gouweleeuw 69' (o.g.); Sigþórsson 75'; De Jong 103'

Amsterdam Arena, Amsterdam
Attendance: 47,000
Referee: Richard Liesveld

AZ	Ajax

GK	1	(Costa Rica) Esteban Alvarado
RB	2	(Sweden) Mattias Johansson
CB	24	(Netherlands) Jeffrey Gouweleeuw
CB	29	(Belgium) Jan Wuytens
LB	4	(Netherlands) Nick Viergever (c)
DM	8	(Serbia) Nemanja Gudelj
CM	19	(Norway) Markus Henriksen
CM	12	(Sweden) Viktor Elm	(substituted off) 81'
RW	23	(Netherlands) Roy Beerens	(substituted off) 84'
CF	20	(Iceland) Aron Jóhannsson
LW	7	(Iceland) Jóhann Berg Guðmundsson	(substituted off) 98'
Substitutes:
GK	16	(Belgium) Yves De Winter
DF	28	(Finland) Thomas Lam
DF	5	(Netherlands) Donny Gorter
MF	26	(Paraguay) Celso Ortiz
MF	10	(Cameroon) Willie Overtoom	(substituted on) 81'
MF	11	(Belgium) Maarten Martens	(substituted on) 98'
FW	40	(Netherlands) Fernando Lewis	(substituted on) 84'
Manager:
(Netherlands) Gertjan Verbeek

GK	1	(Netherlands) Kenneth Vermeer
RB	2	(Netherlands) Ricardo van Rhijn	(substituted off) 90+1'
CB	3	(Belgium) Toby Alderweireld
CB	4	(Finland) Niklas Moisander
LB	17	(Netherlands) Daley Blind	(substituted off) 106'
CM	8	(Denmark) Christian Eriksen
CM	10	(Netherlands) Siem de Jong (c)
CM	20	(Denmark) Lasse Schöne
RW	11	(Spain) Bojan	(substituted off) 64'
CF	9	(Iceland) Kolbeinn Sigþórsson
LW	7	(Denmark) Viktor Fischer
Substitutes:
GK	22	(Netherlands) Jasper Cillessen
DF	12	(Netherlands) Joël Veltman	(substituted on) 90+1'
DF	15	(Denmark) Nicolai Boilesen	(substituted on) 106'
MF	5	(Denmark) Christian Poulsen
MF	25	(South Africa) Thulani Serero
FW	16	(Denmark) Lucas Andersen	(substituted on) 64'
FW	23	(Netherlands) Danny Hoesen
Manager:
(Netherlands) Frank de Boer

Match officials:

- Assistant referees:
  - Dave Goossens
  - Hessel Steegstra
- Fourth official:
  - Dennis Higler
