= Bas Nijhuis =

Dutch football referee

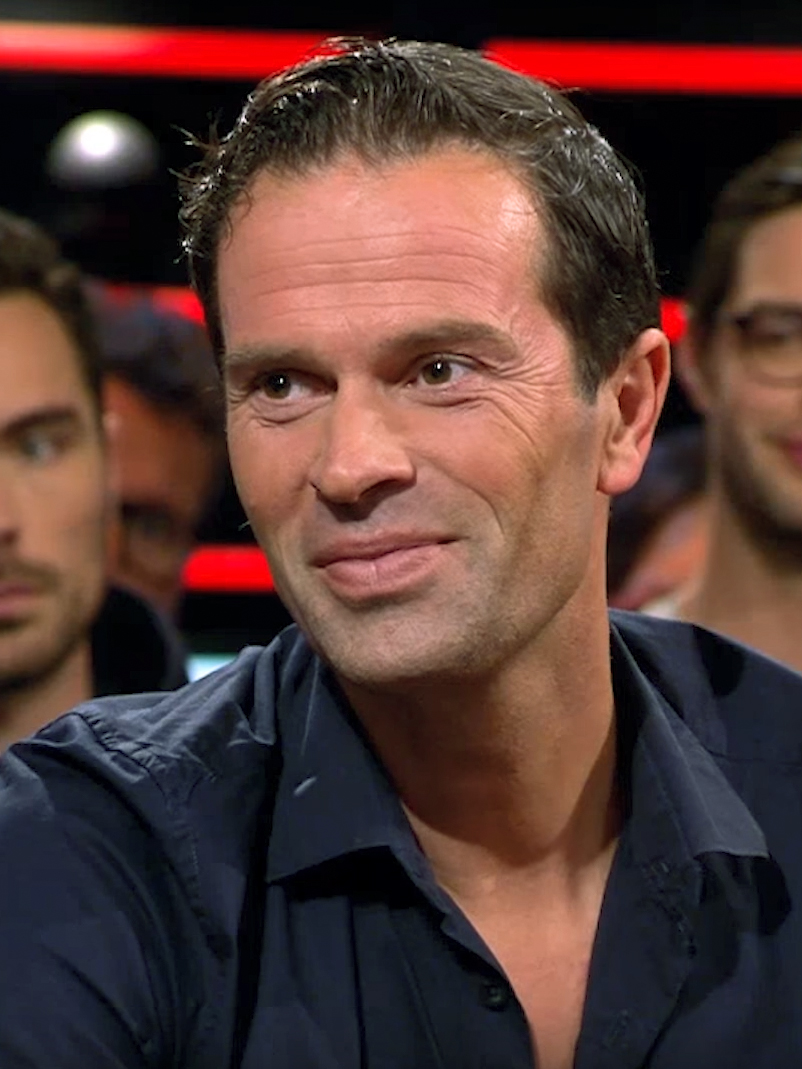
- Full name: Hendrikus Sebastian Nijhuis
- Born: 12 January 1977 (age 49); Enschede, Netherlands

Domestic
Years	League	Role

International
Years	League	Role
2007–	FIFA listed	Referee

Hendrikus Sebastian "Bas" Nijhuis (born 12 January 1977) is a Dutch football referee. Since 2007 he has officiated for FIFA international matches. Nijhuis comes from Enschede.

== Career ==
Inspired by his father, who had also served as a referee, Nijhuis began refereeing at the age of 15 years. In March 2005 he made his debut in a SC Heerenveen match against RKC Waalwijk in the highest Dutch league, the Eredivisie. He has served as an official in the group stages of the UEFA Champions League and UEFA Cup in 2007 after being appointed as a FIFA referee. In 2009, Nijhuis was one of six referees at the FIFA U-20 World Cup.

In 2011, he was selected for the U-17 World Cup in Mexico. Nijhuis has also officiated in qualifying matches for the 2010 and 2014 World Cups.

On 21 December 2011 Bas Nijhuis sent off AZ Alkmaar goalkeeper Esteban Alvarado in a KNVB Cup second round match against Ajax after he retaliated following an attack by a pitch invader. Alvarado's sending off caused his manager, Gertjan Verbeek, to order the team to walk off and abandon the match in protest.

== International matches refereed ==
Date	Match	Results	Type	Yellow card	Red and yellow card	Red card
26-03-2008	Belgium – Morocco	1 – 4	Friendly	2	0	0
10-06-2009	England – Andorra	6 – 0	UEFA qualifier	3	0	0
18-11-2009	Malta – Bulgaria	1 – 4	Friendly	4	0	0
27-05-2010	Denmark – Senegal	2 – 0	Friendly	0	0	0
17-11-2010	Hungary – Lithuania	2 – 0	Friendly	3	0	0
29-03-2011	Estonia – Serbia	1 – 1	UEFA qualifier	6	0	0
12-10-2014	Austria - Montenegro	1 - 0	UEFA qualifier	5	0	0
06-10-2017	Republic of Ireland - Moldova	2 - 0	FIFA qualifier	2	0	1
