= Jeffrey Gouweleeuw =

Dutch footballer (born 1991)

Personal information
- Date of birth: 10 July 1991 (age 35)
- Place of birth: Heemskerk, Netherlands
- Height: 1.88 m (6 ft 2 in)
- Position: Centre-back

Team information
- Current team: FC Augsburg
- Number: 6

Youth career
- ADO '20
- 2006–2010: Heerenveen

Senior career*
Years	Team	Apps	(Gls)
2010–2013	Heerenveen	68	(4)
2013–2016	AZ	87	(4)
2016–	FC Augsburg	276	(7)

International career
2009	Netherlands U19	2	(0)
2012–2013	Netherlands U21	3	(0)
- * Club domestic league appearances and goals as of 31 October 2026

Jeffrey Gouweleeuw (born 10 July 1991) is a Dutch professional footballer who plays as a centre-back for and captains Bundesliga club FC Augsburg.

== Club career ==
=== AZ ===
Born in Heemskerk, Gouweleeuw began his early career with ADO '20 and Heerenveen, before signing a five-year contract with AZ in May 2013, having received interest from the club since December 2012.

In August 2015, after being made club captain at AZ, a transfer to Greek club Olympiacos fell through. He suffered an injury in December 2015, one of a number of AZ's defenders on the sidelines.

=== FC Augsburg ===
In January 2016, Gouweleeuw moved to German club FC Augsburg. He made his debut for the club on 14 February in a 2–1 home loss to Bayern Munich in the Bundesliga. On 11 September, he scored his first goal for Augsburg in a 2–1 victory against Werder Bremen.

Following the retirement of Daniel Baier in September 2020, Gouweleeuw was appointed as the new captain of Augsburg by head coach Heiko Herrlich.

== International career ==
Gouweleeuw has formerly played for the Netherlands under-21 national team.

== Career statistics ==
As of match played 31 October 2026

Appearances and goals by club, season and competition
Club	Season	League			National cup (Note: Includes KNVB Cup, DFB-Pokal)		Europe		Other		Total	
Club	Season	Division	Apps	Goals	Apps	Goals	Apps	Goals	Apps	Goals	Apps	Goals
Heerenveen	2010–11	Eredivisie	6	0	0	0	0	0	0	0	6	0
Heerenveen	2011–12	Eredivisie	30	3	5	1	0	0	0	0	35	4
Heerenveen	2012–13	Eredivisie	32	1	3	1	4 (Note: Appearances in UEFA Europa League)	0	0	0	39	2
Heerenveen	Total		68	4	8	2	4	0	0	0	80	6
AZ	2013–14	Eredivisie	37	1	5	1	12	1	1 (Note: Appearance in Johan Cruyff Shield)	0	55	3
AZ	2014–15	Eredivisie	34	1	4	1	—		—		38	2
AZ	2015–16	Eredivisie	16	2	3	2	10	3	—		29	7
AZ	Total		87	4	12	4	22	4	1	0	122	12
Augsburg	2015–16	Bundesliga	11	0	0	0	—		—		11	0
Augsburg	2016–17	Bundesliga	18	2	1	0	—		—		19	2
Augsburg	2017–18	Bundesliga	27	0	1	0	—		—		28	0
Augsburg	2018–19	Bundesliga	25	0	3	0	—		—		28	0
Augsburg	2019–20	Bundesliga	21	0	0	0	—		—		21	0
Augsburg	2020–21	Bundesliga	32	1	2	0	—		—		34	1
Augsburg	2021–22	Bundesliga	29	2	1	0	—		—		30	2
Augsburg	2022–23	Bundesliga	32	0	2	0	—		—		34	0
Augsburg	2023–24	Bundesliga	30	1	0	0	—		—		30	1
Augsburg	2024–25	Bundesliga	33	1	4	0	—		—		37	1
Augsburg	2025–26	Bundesliga	11	0	1	0	—		—		12	0
Augsburg	2026–27	Bundesliga	7	0	1	0	—		—		8	0
Augsburg	Total		276	7	16	0	—		—		292	7
Career total			431	15	36	6	26	4	1	0	494	25
