= Paul Kok =

Dutch footballer (born 1994)

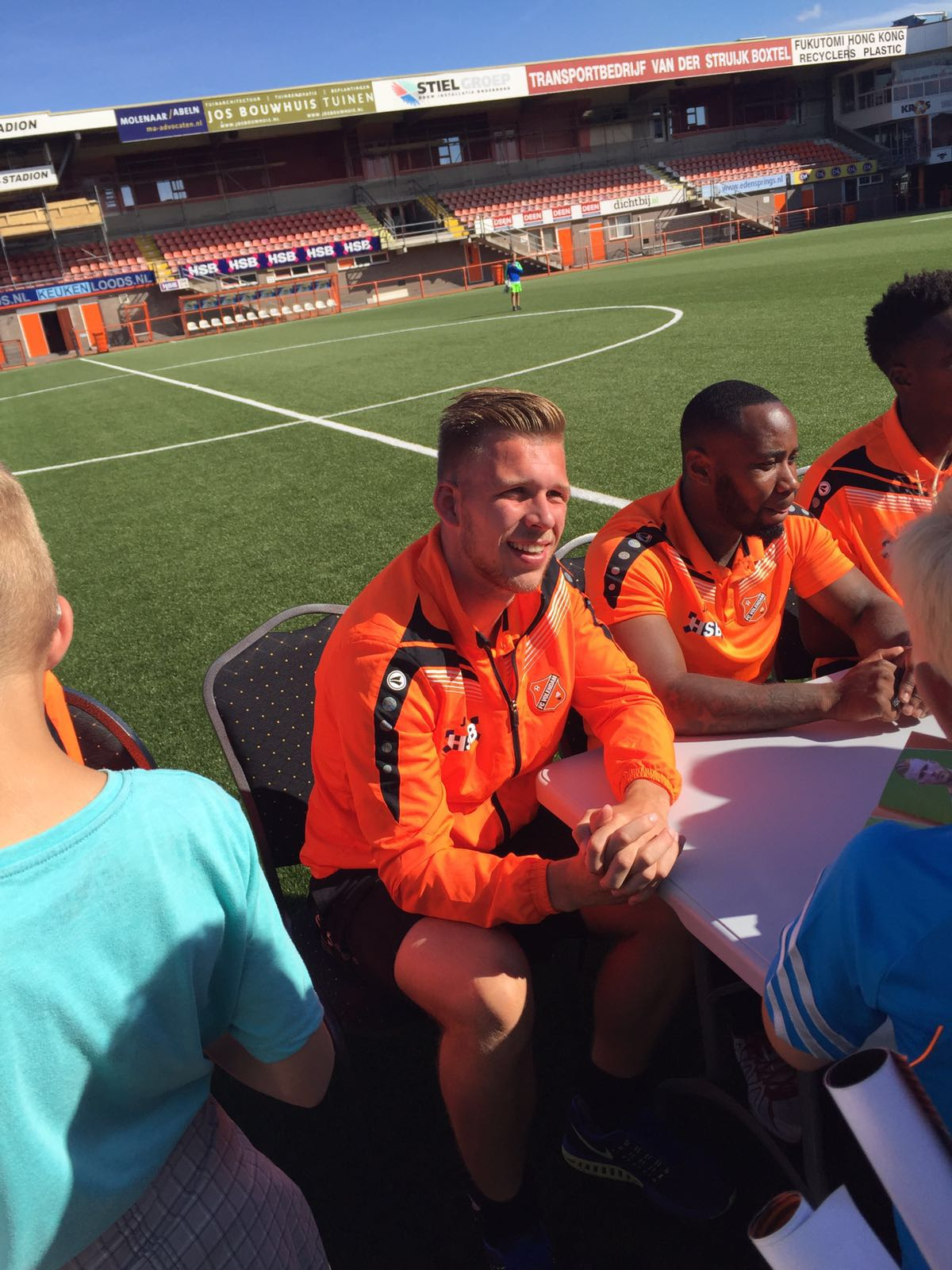

Personal information
- Date of birth: 21 December 1994 (age 31)
- Place of birth: Hoorn, Netherlands
- Height: 1.90 m (6 ft 3 in)
- Position: Left-back

Team information
- Current team: Katwijk
- Number: 5

Youth career
- SC Spirit'30
- De Zouaven
- AZ

Senior career*
Years	Team	Apps	(Gls)
2013–2014	AZ	0	(0)
2013–2014	→ Telstar (loan)	31	(0)
2014–2016	FC Oss	37	(0)
2016–2019	Volendam	68	(1)
2019–2020	Koninklijke HFC	17	(0)
2020–	Katwijk	98	(1)
- * Club domestic league appearances and goals as of 13:13, 22 October 2024 (UTC)

Paul Kok (born 21 December 1994) is a Dutch footballer who plays as a left-back for Katwijk in the Tweede Divisie.

== Career ==
Kok did not make one appearance for AZ first team and was loaned to Eerste Divisie side Telstar for the 2013–14 season.

On loan at the club Kok played 31 times in the season primarily as a left back, the club finished 15th out of the 20 team division and had the second worst defence in the league, Achilles '29 had the honour of conceding the most goals.

Kok joined Oss on a free transfer after his contract expired at AZ and signed a one-year contract with an option of an additional year.

On 27 September 2019, Kok signed with Tweede Divisie club Koninklijke HFC. After one season there, he joined fellow Tweede Divisie club VV Katwijk after having signing a pre-contract in January 2020.

== Honours ==
Katwijk

- Tweede Divisie: 2021–22, 2022–23
