= Mattias Johansson =

Swedish footballer

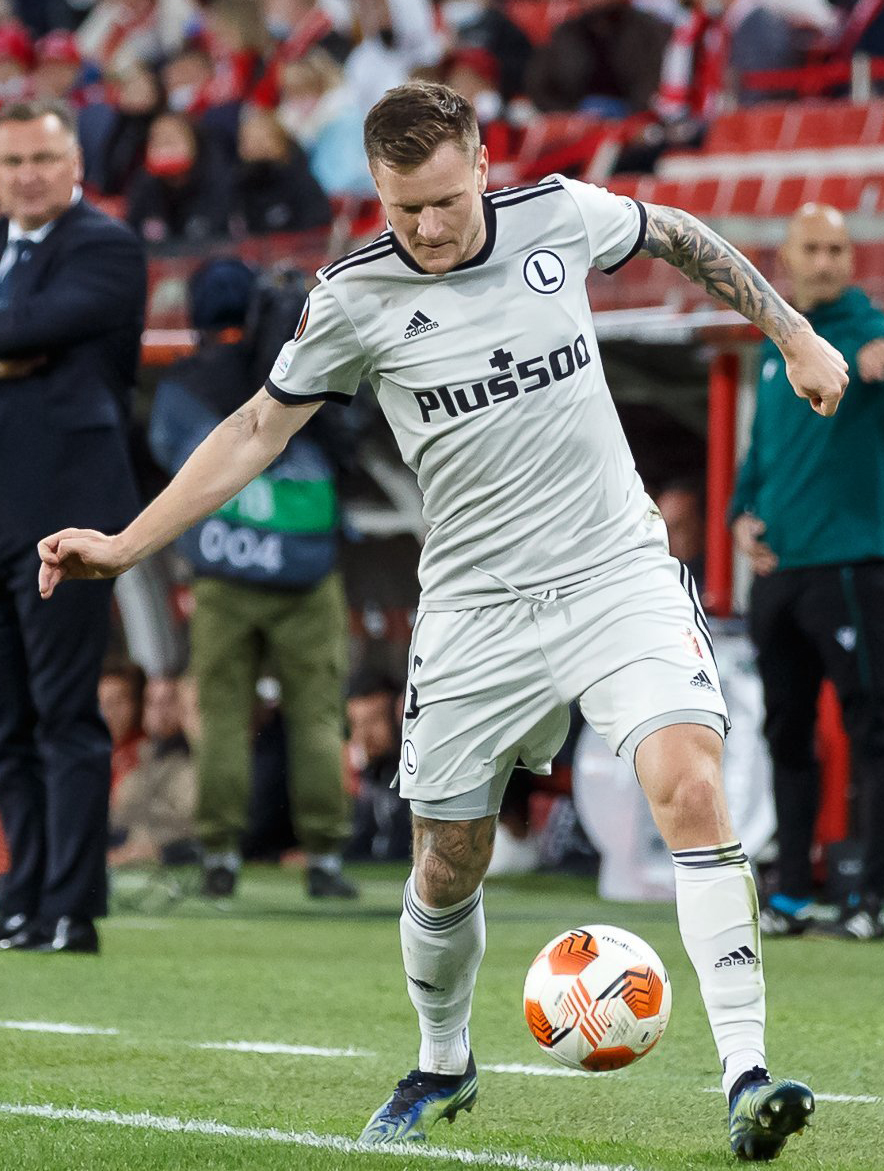
- Johansson playing for Legia in 2021

Personal information
- Full name: Mattias Erik Johansson
- Date of birth: 16 February 1992 (age 34)
- Place of birth: Jönköping, Sweden
- Height: 1.74 m (5 ft 9 in)
- Position: Right back

Team information
- Current team: Apollon Kalythies

Youth career
- –2007: IF Hallby
- 2008–2009: Kalmar FF

Senior career*
Years	Team	Apps	(Gls)
2009–2011	Kalmar FF	41	(1)
2012–2017	AZ	125	(6)
2017–2020	Panathinaikos	63	(5)
2020–2021	Gençlerbirliği	29	(3)
2021–2023	Legia Warsaw	31	(2)
2024	IFK Göteborg	7	(0)
2024–2025	AEL	5	(0)
2025	Niki Volos	6	(0)
2025–2026	Jönköpings Södra IF	8	(0)
2026–	Apollon Kalythies		

International career^{‡}
2007–2009	Sweden U17	19	(0)
2009–2010	Sweden U19	6	(0)
2011–2015	Sweden U21	18	(0)
2014–2021	Sweden	8	(1)
- * Club domestic league appearances and goals as of 1 December 2025 ‡ National team caps and goals as of 23:09, 8 September 2021 (UTC)

Mattias Erik Johansson (born 16 February 1992) is a Swedish professional footballer who plays as a right back for Gamma Ethniki club Apollon Kalythies. Starting his career with Kalmar FF in 2009, he went on to play professionally in the Netherlands, Greece, Turkey, and Poland before returning to Sweden in 2024. A full international since 2014, he has won eight caps and scored one goal for the Sweden national team.

== Club career ==
AZ Alkmaar signed Johansson on a four-year contract for a fee of around €1.5 million on 27 January 2012.

On 1 August 2017, Johansson, who had been released by AZ Alkmaar, moved to Super League Greece club Panathinaikos.

On 16 September 2018, he scored a brace in a 3–1 away win game against AEL. On 23 September 2018, he scored for the second game in the row, the third goal of Panathinaikos at the 3–0 victory against Levadiakos, a goal that made him the top scorer of Panathinaikos after four games. On 24 November 2018, Johansson scored a goal in a 5–1 home win game against struggling Apollon Smyrnis.

On 21 June 2021, Johansson signed a two-year deal with Polish Ekstraklasa champions Legia Warsaw.

On 27 March 2024, Johansson signed a short-term deal with Swedish side IFK Göteborg until 31 July 2024.

After some time back in Greece, he was presented on August 24, 2025 for the Söderettan club Jönköpings Södra IF, in his hometown. He left the club in November, after the end of the season.

== Career statistics ==
=== Club ===
As of 29 November 2021

Appearances and goals by club, season and competition
Club	Season	League			National cup (Note: Includes Svenska Cupen, KNVB Cup, Greek Cup, Polish Cup)		Europe		Other		Total	
Club	Season	Division	Apps	Goals	Apps	Goals	Apps	Goals	Apps	Goals	Apps	Goals
Kalmar FF	2009	Allsvenskan	4	0	—		—		—		4	0
Kalmar FF	2010	Allsvenskan	13	0	2	0	6 (Note: Appearance(s) in UEFA Europa League)	0	—		21	0
Kalmar FF	2011	Allsvenskan	24	1	3	0	—		—		27	1
Kalmar FF	Total		41	1	5	0	6	0	—		52	1
AZ	2011–12	Eredivisie	4	0	—		—		—		4	0
AZ	2012–13	Eredivisie	12	0	5	0	—		—		17	0
AZ	2013–14	Eredivisie	31	4	3	0	11	0	1 (Note: Appearance in Johan Cruyff Shield)	0	46	4
AZ	2014–15	Eredivisie	31	1	3	0	—		—		34	1
AZ	2015–16	Eredivisie	26	1	3	0	10	0	—		39	1
AZ	2016–17	Eredivisie	25	0	2	0	9	0	—		36	0
AZ	Total		129	6	16	0	30	0	1	0	176	6
Panathinaikos	2017–18	Superleague Greece	21	1	2	0	1	0	—		24	1
Panathinaikos	2018–19	Superleague Greece	19	4	2	0	—		—		21	4
Panathinaikos	2019–20	Superleague Greece	23	0	4	0	—		—		27	0
Panathinaikos	Total		63	5	8	0	1	0	—		72	5
Gençlerbirliği	2020–21	Süper Lig	29	3	0	0	—		—		29	3
Legia Warsaw	2021–22	Ekstraklasa	5	1	1	0	7 (Note: Two appearances in UEFA Champions League, five appearances in UEFA Europa League)	0	0	0	13	1
Career total			267	16	28	0	44	0	1	0	342	16

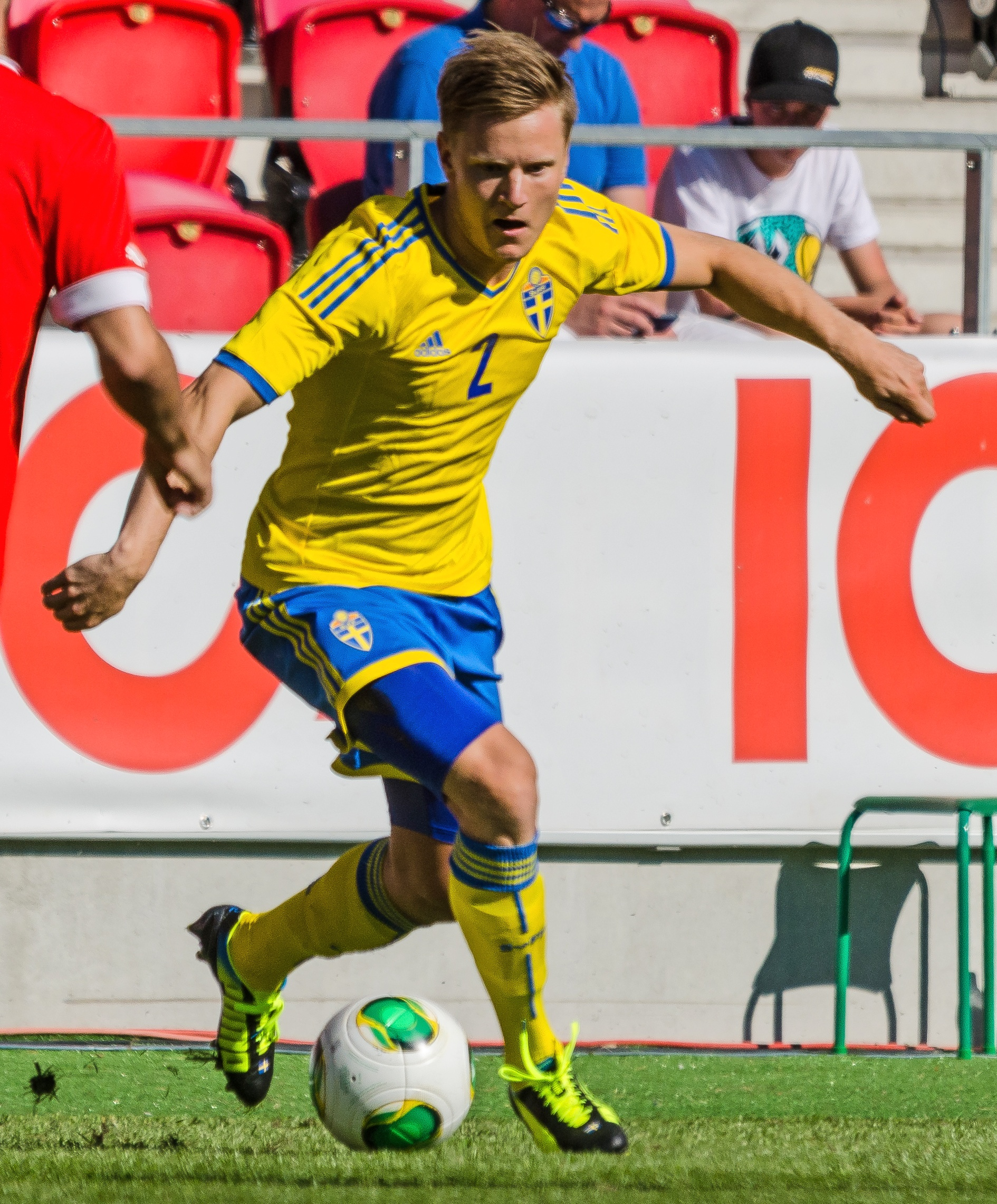
Johansson playing for Sweden U21 in 2013

=== International ===
Appearances and goals by national team and year
National team	Year	Apps	Goals
Sweden	2014	3	0
Sweden	2020	3	1
Sweden	2021	2	0
Total		8	1

Scores and results list Sweden's goal tally first, score column indicates score after each Johansson goal.

List of international goals scored by Mattias Johansson
No.	Date	Venue	Opponent	Score	Result	Competition
1	8 October 2020	VEB Arena, Moscow, Russia	Russia	2–0	2–1	Friendly

== Honours ==
AZ

- KNVB Cup: 2012–13

Legia Warsaw

- Polish Cup: 2022–23
