= Djavan Anderson =

Surinamese footballer (born 1995)

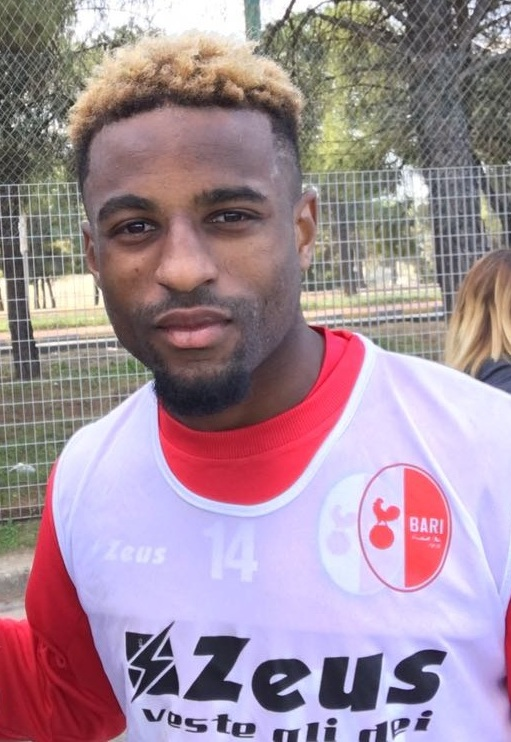
- Anderson training for Bari in 2017

Personal information
- Date of birth: 21 April 1995 (age 31)
- Place of birth: Amsterdam, Netherlands
- Height: 1.74 m (5 ft 9 in)
- Positions: Midfielder; right-back

Team information
- Current team: Al-Nahda
- Number: 8

Youth career
- –2010: AFC
- 2010–2013: Ajax

Senior career*
Years	Team	Apps	(Gls)
2013–2014	Ajax	0	(0)
2013–2014	→ Jong Ajax	8	(0)
2014–2015	AZ	1	(0)
2015–2017	SC Cambuur	26	(1)
2017–2018	Bari	19	(2)
2018–2022	Lazio	9	(0)
2018–2019	→ Salernitana (loan)	18	(1)
2021–2022	→ Cosenza (loan)	8	(0)
2022	→ PEC Zwolle (loan)	14	(0)
2022–2023	Oxford United	25	(1)
2025	Lecco	11	(0)
2025–2026	Al-Ittifaq	27	(4)
2026–	Al-Nahda	4	(1)

International career^{‡}
2012	Netherlands U17	11	(0)
2012	Netherlands U18	2	(0)
2025–	Suriname	6	(0)
Medal record
Men's football
Representing Netherlands
UEFA European Under-17 Championship
Winner	2012 Slovenia
- * Club domestic league appearances and goals as of 19 October 2026 ‡ National team caps and goals as of 28 September 2026

Djavan Lorenzo Anderson (born 21 April 1995) is a professional footballer who plays as a midfielder or right-back for Oman Professional League club Al-Nahda. Born in the Netherlands, he plays for the Suriname national team.

== Club career ==
=== Ajax ===
Anderson began his football career with AFC in Amsterdam before joining the Ajax Youth Academy in 2010. He had briefly interrupted his football career to pursue a career in gymnastics, before returning to football. On 23 April 2012, Anderson signed his first professional contract with Ajax, binding him to the club until 30 June 2015. During the 2013–14 season Anderson began playing for the Ajax A1 selection, the under-19 side of the club, making three appearances in the UEFA Youth League, the Champions League equivalent for under-19 teams. Due to the absence of several reserves, who were competing Internationally on Matchday 7 of the Eerste Divisie, Anderson made his professional debut playing for the reserves team Jong Ajax in the away match against Achilles '29, which ended in a 2–1 loss. After the winter break in January it was announced that he would not return to the under-19 squad and would remain with Jong Ajax for the remainder of the season, making eight appearances in total.

=== AZ ===
On 19 June 2014, it was announced that Anderson would transfer to AZ. With newly appointed head coach Marco van Basten taking a particular interest in the young player, a transfer fee of €200,000 was agreed upon between the two clubs, with Anderson signing on for three years. He made his Eredivisie debut on 8 November 2014 in a 1–0 away win against NAC Breda.

=== Cambuur ===
On 19 August 2015, it was announced that Anderson had signed a two-year contract with Eredivisie side SC Cambuur.

=== Bari ===
On 7 September 2017, it was announced that Anderson had signed with Bari in the Italian Serie B.

=== Lazio ===
On 27 July 2018, Djavan signed for Serie A side Lazio on a free transfer.

==== Salernitana (loan) ====
On 17 August 2018, Djavan joined Serie B club Salernitana on loan until 30 June 2019.

==== PEC Zwolle (loan) ====
On 31 January 2022, Anderson returned to the Netherlands and joined PEC Zwolle on loan until the end of the season.

=== Oxford United ===
On 1 September 2022, Anderson signed for Oxford United on a one-year deal, with an option for a further year. On 13 September, he made his league debut for the club, coming on in the 75th minute in a 1–0 defeat to Plymouth Argyle. On 29 October, Anderson scored his first goal for the club in a 3–1 win against Bolton Wanderers. This was Anderson's only goal in 25 league appearances (9 of them as substitute) for Oxford. His contract extension clause was not activated at the end of the 2022–23 season.

=== Lecco ===
After a year and a half without club football, on 14 February 2025 Anderson signed with Lecco in Italian Serie C until the end of the 2024–25 season.

=== Al-Ittifaq ===
On 11 September 2025, Anderson moved to UAE First Division side Al-Ittifaq.

== International career ==
Born in the Netherlands, Anderson is of Jamaican and Surinamese descent. On 2 February 2012, Anderson made his debut for the Netherlands under-17 side in a match at the XXXV Torneio Int. do Algarve '12 against France U-17 in a 1–0 victory. He was a part of the Netherlands U17 team to compete in the 2012 UEFA European Under-17 Championship in Slovenia where the Dutch secured their second title in the competition, playing in all matches and helping his team to defeat Germany U-17 in the final. On 11 September 2012 Anderson made his debut for the Netherlands under-18 squad in a friendly match against the United States U-18. The match ended in a 4–2 loss.

In March 2022, he was called up for Suriname for a friendly match against Thailand.

On 3 October 2025, FIFA approved Anderson's request to change his sporting nationality from Dutch to Surinamese. A week later, he made his debut as a starter against Guatemala.

== Career statistics ==
As of match played 14 September 2025

Appearances and goals by club, season and competition
Club	Season	League			National cup (Note: Includes KNVB Cup, Coppa Italia, FA Cup, UAE President's Cup)		Continental		Other		Total	
Club	Season	Division	Apps	Goals	Apps	Goals	Apps	Goals	Apps	Goals	Apps	Goals
Jong Ajax	2013–14	Eerste Divisie	8	0	—		—		—		8	0
AZ	2014–15	Eredivisie	1	0	0	0	—		—		1	0
SC Cambuur	2015–16	Eredivisie	9	0	0	0	—		—		9	0
SC Cambuur	2016–17	Eerste Divisie	17	1	2	0	—		0	0	19	1
SC Cambuur	Total		26	1	2	0	0	0	0	0	28	1
Bari	2017–18	Serie B	19	2	0	0	—		—		19	2
Lazio	2019–20	Serie A	6	0	1	0	0	0	0	0	7	0
Lazio	2020–21	Serie A	3	0	0	0	0	0	—		3	0
Lazio	Total		9	0	1	0	0	0	0	0	10	0
Salernitana (loan)	2018–19	Serie B	18	1	0	0	—		1 (Note: Appearance in Serie B relegation play-out)	0	19	1
Cosenza (loan)	2021–22	Serie B	8	0	0	0	—		—		8	0
PEC Zwolle (loan)	2021–22	Eredivisie	14	0	0	0	—		—		14	0
Oxford United	2022–23	League One	25	1	3	0	—		2 (Note: Appearances in EFL Trophy)	0	30	1
Lecco	2024–25	Serie C Group A	11	0	—		—		—		11	0
Al-Ittifaq	2025–26	UAE First Division League	?	?	1	0	—		—		1	0
Career total			139	5	7	0	0	0	3	0	149	5

=== International ===
As of match played 28 September 2026

Appearances and goals by national team and year
National team	Year	Apps	Goals
Suriname	2025	4	0
Suriname	2026	2	0
Total		2	0

== Honours ==
Netherlands U17

- UEFA European Under-17 Championship: 2012
