= Mikhail Rosheuvel =

Dutch footballer (born 1990)

Personal information
- Date of birth: 10 August 1990 (age 36)
- Place of birth: Amsterdam, Netherlands
- Height: 1.76 m (5 ft 9 in)
- Position: Winger

Youth career
- Zaanlandia
- Hellas Sport
- Ajax
- AZ

Senior career*
Years	Team	Apps	(Gls)
2009–2012	Almere City	90	(13)
2012–2015	AZ	23	(1)
2013–2014	→ Heracles Almelo (loan)	34	(4)
2015–2016	Cambuur	34	(3)
2016–2018	Roda JC Kerkrade	65	(4)
2018–2019	NAC Breda	33	(5)
2019–2021	Al Dhafra	35	(4)
2021–2024	Erzurumspor FK	69	(8)
- * Club domestic league appearances and goals as of 11 May 2024

Mikhail Rosheuvel (born 10 August 1990) is a Dutch professional footballer who plays as a winger.

== Career ==
Rosheuvel was born in Amsterdam. He was added to the Ajax youth academy at a young age due to his impressive skill and speed. However, after only a single year in the club he was sent away. He was quickly picked up by AZ, where he went through the several youth teams. He never made it to the first team, and was signed by second division side, FC Omniworld, where he made his professional debut on 24 August 2009, in a 0–0 home draw against Fortuna Sittard.

== Personal life ==
Born in the Netherlands, Rosheuvel is of Surinamese descent.

== Honours ==
AZ

- KNVB Cup: 2012–13
