= Wesley Hoedt =

Dutch footballer

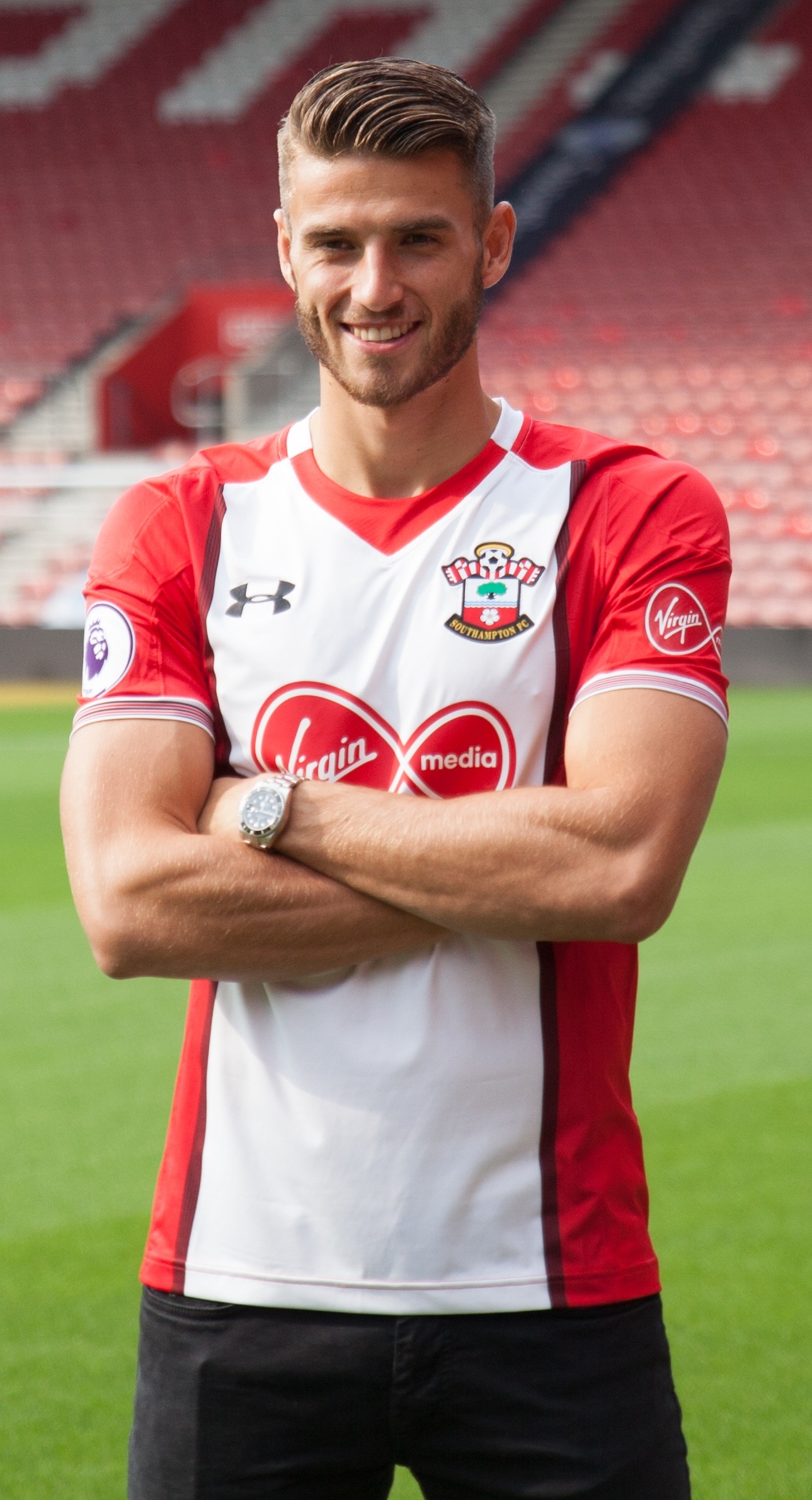
- Hoedt with Southampton in 2017

Personal information
- Full name: Wesley Theodorus Hoedt
- Date of birth: 6 March 1994 (age 32)
- Place of birth: Alkmaar, Netherlands
- Height: 1.88 m (6 ft 2 in)
- Position: Centre back

Team information
- Current team: AZ
- Number: 29

Youth career
- VV Reiger Boys
- –2005: Hollandia
- 2005–2013: AZ

Senior career*
Years	Team	Apps	(Gls)
2013–2015	AZ	26	(2)
2015–2017	Lazio	48	(2)
2017–2021	Southampton	41	(0)
2019	→ Celta Vigo (loan)	10	(0)
2019–2020	→ Antwerp (loan)	21	(0)
2020–2021	→ Lazio (loan)	17	(0)
2021–2023	Anderlecht	53	(1)
2023–2024	Watford	59	(4)
2024–2026	Al-Shabab	63	(5)
2026–	AZ	3	(0)

International career^{‡}
2008–2009	Netherlands U15	4	(0)
2013–2014	Netherlands U20	6	(0)
2015–2016	Netherlands U21	4	(0)
2017	Netherlands	6	(0)
- * Club domestic league appearances and goals as of 06:34, 14 November 2026 (UTC) ‡ National team caps and goals as of 3 September 2017 (UTC)

Wesley Theodorus Hoedt (Dutch pronunciation: [ˈʋɛsli ˈɦut]; born 6 March 1994) is a Dutch professional footballer who plays as a centre back for Eredivisie club AZ.

Hoedt is a product of the AZ academy and was promoted to the first team in the 2014–15 season. In 2015, he joined Serie A club Lazio before he moved to Premier League club Southampton in August 2017. Hoedt had loan spells with Celta Vigo, Antwerp and Lazio. In June 2021, he signed for Anderlecht. Hoedt played for Watford and Al-Shabab before he returned to AZ.

After his senior debut in March 2017, Hoedt made six appearances for the Netherlands.

== Club career ==
=== AZ ===
Hoedt was born in Alkmaar and raised in Heerhugowaard and is a product of the youth academy from AZ. For the 2014–15 season, he was promoted to the first team and named in the 24-man squad for the upcoming season.

=== Lazio ===
Following Hoedt's departure from AZ in 2015, Serie A club Lazio signed him on a free transfer. He signed a four-year contract worth €1.25m per season. Hoedt scored his first goal for the club on 21 August 2016 in a 4–3 away victory against Atalanta.

=== Southampton ===
On 22 August 2017, Hoedt signed for Southampton on a five-year deal reported to be €17 million (£15 million). He made his debut on 9 September 2017 in a 0–2 defeat against Watford. On 17 February 2018, Hoedt scored his first goal for the club in a 1–2 victory against West Bromwich Albion in the FA Cup.

==== Loan moves ====
Hoedt joined La Liga club Celta Vigo on 22 January 2019 on loan until the end of the season, with an option to purchase. He made his debut on 27 January in an away game against Real Valladolid where he was booked twice and sent off.

Hoedt joined Belgian First Division A club Royal Antwerp on loan for the rest of the 2019–20 season on 2 September 2019. On 5 October 2020, Hoedt returned to Lazio on a season-long loan deal with an option to buy.

=== Later career ===
On 17 June 2021, Anderlecht announced the signing of Hoedt on their official website. On 31 January 2023, Watford confirmed the signing of Hoedt from Anderlecht on a two-and-a-half-year deal for an undisclosed fee. The same year on 11 February, he made his club debut in a 1–1 draw with Blackburn Rovers with a goal.

On 23 August 2024, Hoedt joined Saudi club Al-Shabab. On 1 September 2026, Hoedt rejoined AZ on a free transfer.

== International career ==
On 25 March 2017, Hoedt debuted for the Netherlands in a 2–0 friendly defeat against Bulgaria, replacing Matthijs de Ligt.

== Personal life ==
Hoedt is fluent in Italian and Spanish to a certain extent. He was in relationship with Dutch singer Emma Heesters from 2020 until 2023.

== Career statistics ==
=== Club ===
As of match played 8 November 2026

Appearances and goals by club, season and competition
Club	Season	League			National cup (Note: Includes KNVB Cup, Coppa Italia, FA Cup, Belgian Cup, King Cup)		League cup (Note: Includes EFL Cup)		Continental		Total	
Club	Season	Division	Apps	Goals	Apps	Goals	Apps	Goals	Apps	Goals	Apps	Goals
AZ	2013–14	Eredivisie	2	0	0	0	—		1 (Note: Appearance(s) in UEFA Europa League)	0	3	0
AZ	2014–15	Eredivisie	24	2	3	0	—		—		27	2
AZ	Total		26	2	3	0	—		1	0	30	2
Lazio	2015–16	Serie A	25	0	2	0	—		8	1	35	1
Lazio	2016–17	Serie A	23	2	3	1	—		—		26	3
Lazio	2017–18	Serie A	0	0	—		—		0	0	0	0
Lazio	Total		48	2	5	1	—		8	1	61	4
Southampton	2017–18	Premier League	28	0	4	1	0	0	—		32	1
Southampton	2018–19	Premier League	13	0	0	0	0	0	—		13	0
Southampton	Total		41	0	4	1	0	0	—		45	1
Celta Vigo (loan)	2018–19	La Liga	10	0	—		—		—		10	0
Antwerp (loan)	2019–20	Belgian Pro League	21	0	4	0	—		—		25	0
Lazio (loan)	2020–21	Serie A	17	0	2	0	—		7 (Note: Appearances in UEFA Champions League)	0	26	0
Anderlecht	2021–22	Belgian Pro League	38	1	6	2	—		4 (Note: Appearances in UEFA Conference League)	1	48	4
Anderlecht	2022–23	Belgian Pro League	15	0	0	0	—		10	0	25	0
Anderlecht	Total		53	1	6	2	—		14	1	73	4
Watford	2022–23	Championship	15	1	0	0	0	0	—		15	1
Watford	2023–24	Championship	44	3	3	0	1	0	—		48	3
Watford	Total		59	4	3	0	1	0	—		63	4
Al-Shabab	2024–25	Saudi Pro League	31	5	4	0	—		—		35	5
Al-Shabab	2025–26	Saudi Pro League	32	0	2	0	—		8 (Note: Appearances in GFF Gulf Club Champions League)	0	42	0
Al-Shabab	Total		63	5	6	0	—		8	0	77	5
AZ	2026–27	Eredivisie	3	0	0	0	—		3	0	6	0
Career total			341	14	33	4	2	0	40	2	416	20

=== International ===
As of match played 3 September 2017

Appearances and goals by national team and year
National team	Year	Apps	Goals
Netherlands	2017	6	0
Total		6	0

== Honours ==
Lazio

- Supercoppa Italiana: 2017
- Coppa Italia runner-up: 2016–17

Individual

- Watford Player of the Season: 2023–24
