= Jonas Heymans =

Belgian footballer

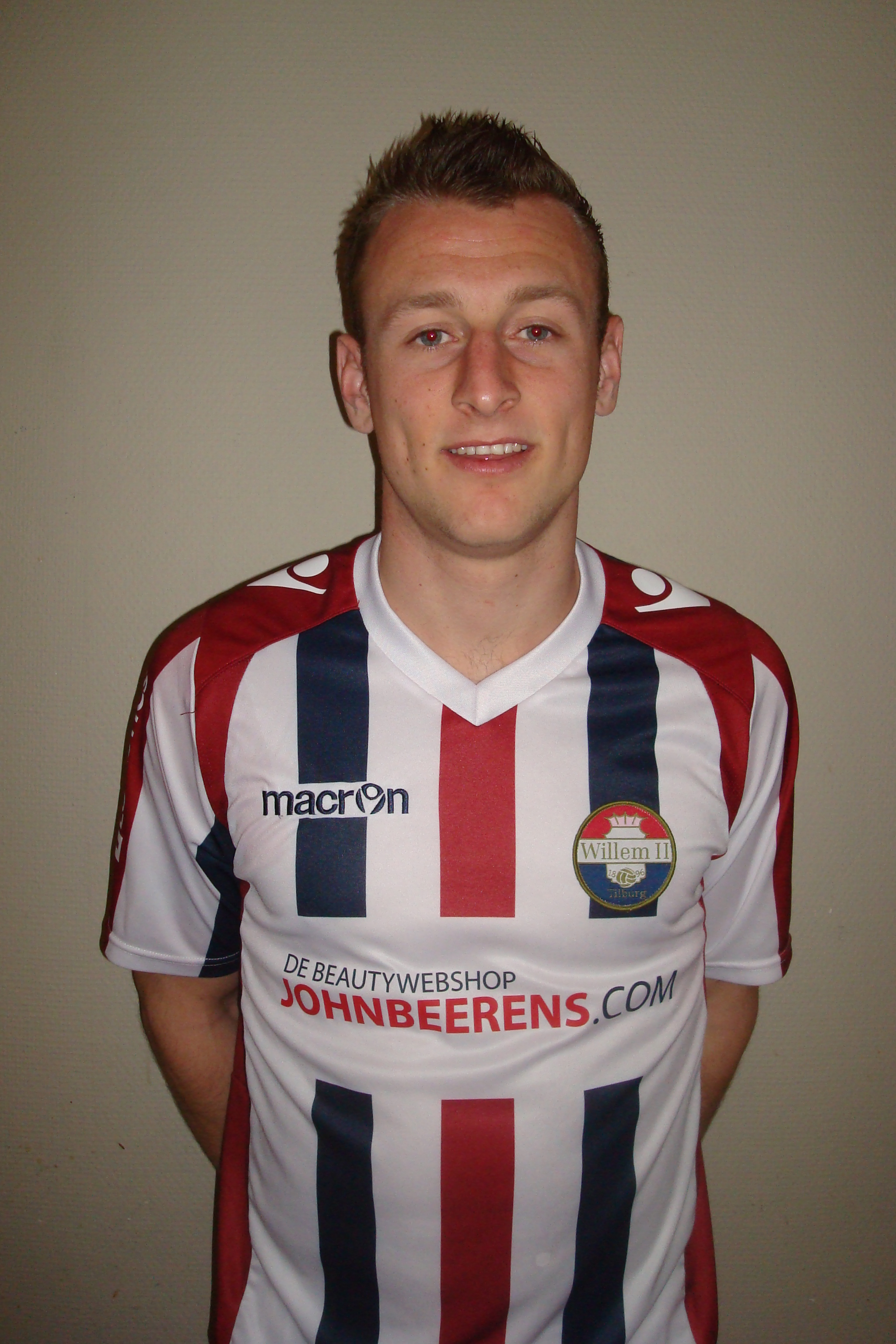

Personal information
- Date of birth: 6 February 1993 (age 33)
- Place of birth: Liedekerke, Belgium
- Height: 1.80 m (5 ft 11 in)
- Position: Left-back

Team information
- Current team: KFC Voorde-Appelterre
- Number: 13

Youth career
- Eendracht Aalst
- Gent
- Standaard Wetteren

Senior career*
Years	Team	Apps	(Gls)
2010–2012	Standaard Wetteren	51	(2)
2012–2013	Lierse	11	(0)
2013–2015	AZ	0	(0)
2014–2015	→ Willem II (loan)	19	(5)
2015	Antwerp	0	(0)
2016–2018	Den Bosch	43	(1)
2018–2019	Eendracht Aalst	33	(3)
2019–2025	RFC Wetteren	123	(11)
2025–	KFC Voorde-Appelterre	0	(0)

International career
2008	Belgium U15	6	(0)
2006	Belgium U16	2	(0)
2010	Belgium U17	1	(0)
2012	Belgium U19	4	(1)
2012	Belgium U20	2	(0)
2012	Belgium U21	2	(0)
- * Club domestic league appearances and goals as of 18:03, 15 January 2026 (UTC)

Jonas Heymans (born 6 February 1993) is a Belgian professional footballer who plays as a left-back for KFC Voorde-Appelterre.

== Honours ==
=== Club ===
Willem II

- Eerste Divisie (1): 2013–14
