= Esteban Alvarado =

Costa Rican football player (born 1989)

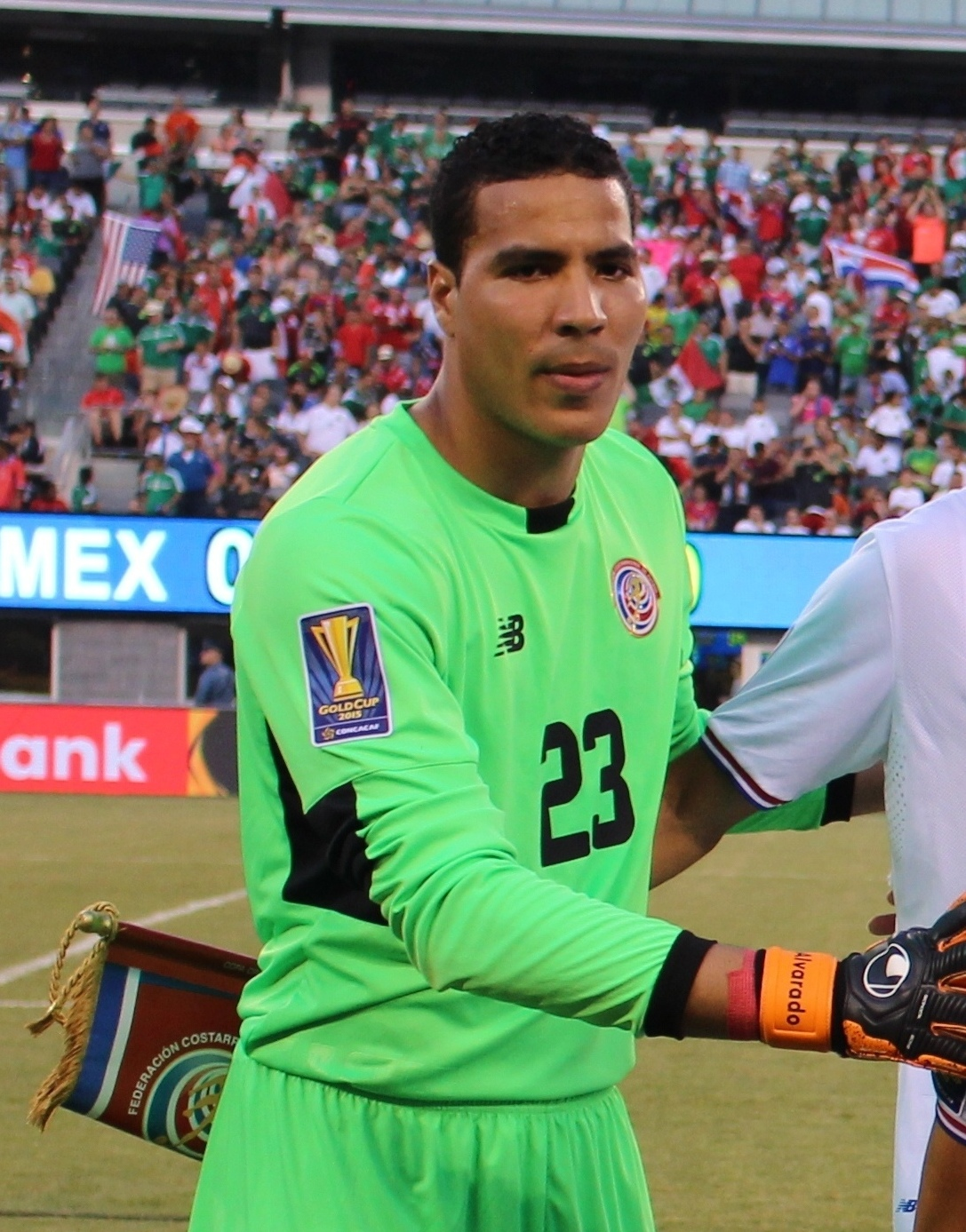
- Alvarado with Costa Rica at the 2015 CONCACAF Gold Cup

Personal information
- Full name: Esteban Alvarado Brown
- Date of birth: 28 April 1989 (age 37)
- Place of birth: Siquirres, Costa Rica
- Height: 1.93 m (6 ft 4 in)
- Position: Goalkeeper

Youth career
- Saprissa

Senior career*
Years	Team	Apps	(Gls)
2008–2009	Saprissa	4	(0)
2010–2015	AZ	138	(0)
2015–2018	Trabzonspor	20	(0)
2019	Alajuelense	0	(0)
2019–2020	Herediano	51	(0)
2020–2021	Limón	20	(0)
2021–2023	Herediano	30	(0)
2023–2025	Saprissa	55	(0)

International career^{‡}
2007–2009	Costa Rica U20	7	(0)
2010–2025	Costa Rica	26	(0)
- * Club domestic league appearances and goals as of 21 May 2025 ‡ National team caps and goals as of 22 January 2025

Esteban Alvarado Brown (born 28 April 1989) is a Costa Rican former professional footballer who played as a goalkeeper for Liga FPD club Saprissa and the Costa Rica national team.

== Club career ==
=== Saprissa ===
Born in Siquirres, Costa Rica, Alvarado started his academy career at Santos de Guápiles before moving to Saprissa. Alvarado made his Saprissa debut, in a 3–1 win over Municipal Liberia on 29 November 2009. With his move to AZ Alkmaar finalised and expected to move in the summer, Alvarado made four appearances for the club and helped the club win the league.

=== AZ Alkmaar ===
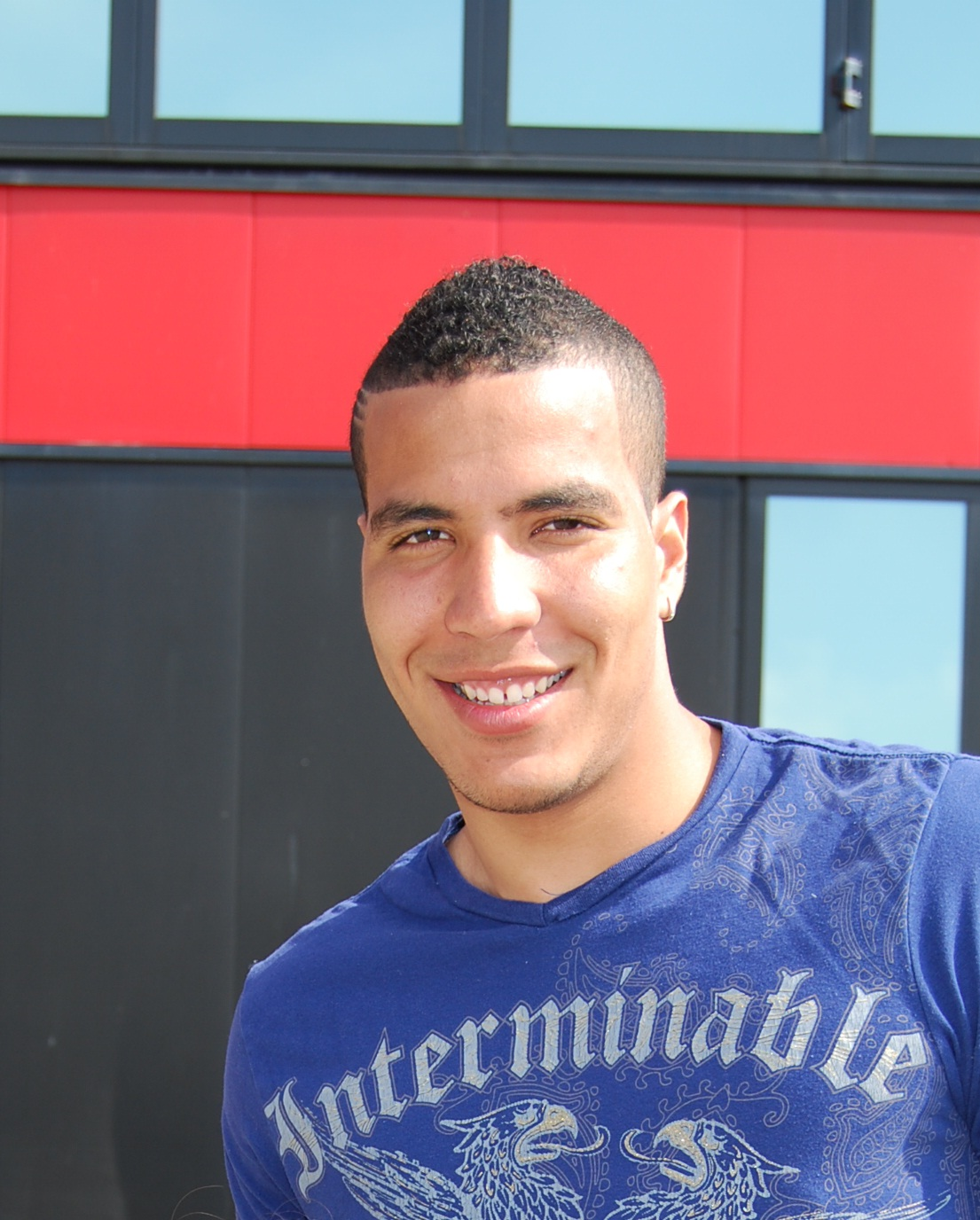
Alvarado during his time at AZ in 2011.

In December 2009, AZ Alkmaar signed the Costa Rican goalkeeper from Deportivo Saprissa, the youngster moved to the Netherlands in July 2010. The move was later confirmed when Alvarado signed a five-year contract with the club, keeping him until 2015.

Following his signing for AZ, Alvarado remained a backup goalkeeper for AZ behind Joey Didulica and Sergio Romero. But after Romeo's injury from his international duty, Alvarado made his AZ debut on 12 February 2011 against PSV Eindhoven, where it turned out to be disastrous when he conceded four goals, in a 4–0 loss. After the match, Alvarado said, quoting: "Only Superman could have saved me." From that on, Alvarado continued to be the first choice goalkeeper temporary, where he made six appearances for the club in the 2010–11 season, including a clean-sheet in a match against Heerenveen on 19 February 2011. Alvarado also find himself left out the squad against Feyenoord when he returned late to Netherlands from Costa Rica.

Ahead of the 2011–12 season, Alvardo was given number thirty-four shirt. Alvarado became a first choice goalkeeper for AZ after Sergio Romero's departure to Sampdoria and Joey Didulica's unexpected retirement. Alvarado made his first AZ appearance of 2011–12 season when he played, in a 2–0 win over Baumit Jablonec on 28 July 2011, which AZ went through after a 1–1 draw against them in the second leg. Alvarado made his league debut of the 2011–12 season, where he helped AZ beat PSV 3–1 in the opening game of the season. His performance soon led supporters voting for Alvarado awarded the club's player of the month November. On 21 December 2011, Alvarado was sent off by Bas Nijhuis in a KNVB Cup match against Ajax after an Ajax supporter tried to attack and injure him. A 19-year-old Ajax fan identified as Wesley van W had been drinking alcohol and entered the pitch after 36 minutes of play. He ran towards the AZ goalkeeper and attempted to kick him but slipped to the ground. Alvarado then kicked the attacker twice and was sent off for violent conduct. This prompted AZ manager Gertjan Verbeek to order his players to the dressing rooms in protest. The game was consequently abandoned. The KNVB subsequently rescinded the red card, and Ajax banned Wesley van W from all of their home matches for life. He was also sentenced to six months in prison, with two months suspended. He would also have to undergo treatment for an alcohol problem and report to police during all Eredivisie and Dutch national team matches. The KNVB ordered the match replayed in its entirety behind closed doors. On 19 January 2012, the match was replayed with Alvarado in goal. AZ beat Ajax 3–2 to progress through the quarter final. Alvarado was the ever present goalkeeper, making thirty-four appearances and earning fifteen clean sheets in the 2011–12 season. Alvarado was also named Goal.com's Eredivisie Team of the Season.

In the 2012–13 season, Alvarado was given number one shirt. Alvarado made his first appearance of the 2012–13 season, in a 2–2 draw against Ajax in the opening game of the season. In both games against Anzhi Makhackala in the play-offs, Alvarado was in goal, as they proved to be too strong and failed to win either legs losing 1–0 and 5–0 respectively. Later in the 2012–13 season, Alvarado was the ever present goalkeeper, making thirty-four appearances in 3060 minutes, as well as, earning five clean sheets. Despite this, Alvarado was in goal for the KNVB Cup final, as AZ beat PSV 2–1, making this as Alvarado's first achievement at AZ Alkmaar.

In the 2013–14 season, Alvarado hinted he may leave the club in effort for new challenges. Despite this, Alvarado made his first appearance of the season, in a 3–2 loss against Ajax in the Johan Cruijff Schaal. Two weeks later on 11 August 2013, Alvarado help the club gain their revenge against Ajax when AZ beat them 3–2. Alvarado also helped the club against Anzhi Makhackala when AZ beat 1–0 on aggregate. Alvarado was the ever present goalkeeper, making thirty-four appearances, including the play-offs, which AZ lost 3–0 on aggregate against Groningen.

In the 2014–15 season, Alvarado continued to be the first choice goalkeeper until he suffered a knee injury that kept him out for months. He spent two months on the sidelines, including having a flu. Alvarado made his return to the first team on 2 November 2014, in a 3–3 draw against Excelsior. Alvarado was featured as a first choice goalkeeper since his return for the rest of the season. For the first time in his AZ career, Alvarado made less than thirty appearances, as he made twenty-six appearances in the 2014–15 season.

With his contract expiring at the end of the 2014–15 season, Alvarado was expected to leave the club, with newly signed Sergio Rochet from Uruguay as his successor. After making his last appearance against Excelsior in the last game of the season, Alvarado helped the club finish third place. During his time at AZ, Alvarado was the club's fan favourite.

=== Trabzonspor ===
After leaving AZ, Alvarado joined Trabzonspor on a free transfer in early-August, keeping him until 2017. The move was officially confirmed on 6 August 2015. Contract between Trabzonspor and Alvarado was terminated on 20 December 2018. Following his departure, he agreed with Costa Rican outfit Liga Deportiva Alajuelense however the movement is not completed due to licensing issues in which Trabzonspor received a caution from FIFA to sort out the issue.

== International career ==
At the 2009 FIFA U-20 World Cup, he was named the best goalkeeper of the tournament. He made his national team début in an August 2010 friendly match against Paraguay.

On 12 March 2012, it was announced that Alvarado was barred from the national team for five months after leaving the team before a friendly match against Spain without communicating the staff. In March 2014, he ruled out a selection for the 2014 FIFA World Cup due to an apparent strife with national team manager Jorge Luis Pinto. But in May 2014, Alvarado was named in a provisional 26-man squad in the FIFA World Cup By the end of May, Alvarado was not named in the 23 men squad, presumed to be a continuous strife with national team manager Pinto.

Following Pinto's departure as manager of Costa, Alvarado returned to the national football team, under new management of Paulo Wanchope. In the CONCACAF Gold Cup, Alvarado was included in the squad and replaced Keylor Navas as a first choice goalkeeper following his injury.

== Personal life ==
Born in Costa Rica, Alvarado is of Jamaican descent. In June 2011, Alvarado was accused by his girlfriend, Marcela Juárez Castillo, of domestic violence. However, two months later, charges against Alvarado were later dropped.

While growing up in Costa Rica, Alvarado made good friends with Joel Campbell, having played together in childhood. Alvarado also revealed that he played as striker before switching position to become goalkeeper at fourteen.

== Career statistics ==
=== Club ===
As of 21 May 2025

Appearances and goals by club, season and competition
Club	Season	League			Cup		Continental		Other		Total	
Club	Season	Division	Apps	Goals	Apps	Goals	Apps	Goals	Apps	Goals	Apps	Goals
Saprissa	2009–10	Liga FPD	4	0	—		—		—		4	0
AZ	2010–11	Eredivisie	6	0	0	0	0	0	—		6	0
AZ	2011–12	Eredivisie	34	0	5	0	16	0	—		55	0
AZ	2012–13	Eredivisie	34	0	6	0	2	0	—		42	0
AZ	2013–14	Eredivisie	34	0	5	0	13	0	5	0	57	0
AZ	2014–15	Eredivisie	26	0	3	0	—		—		29	0
AZ	Total		134	0	19	0	31	0	5	0	189	0
Trabzonspor	2015–16	Süper Lig	14	0	2	0	—		—		16	0
Trabzonspor	2016–17	Süper Lig	3	0	8	0	—		—		11	0
Trabzonspor	2017–18	Süper Lig	3	0	5	0	—		—		8	0
Trabzonspor	2018–19	Süper Lig	0	0	1	0	—		—		1	0
Trabzonspor	Total		20	0	16	0	—		—		36	0
Herediano	2019–20	Liga FPD	43	0	—		2	0	—		45	0
Herediano	2020–21	Liga FPD	8	0	—		0	0	—		8	0
Herediano	Total		51	0	—		2	0	—		53	0
Limón	2020–21	Liga FPD	20	0	—		—		—		20	0
Herediano	2021–22	Liga FPD	14	0	—		—		—		14	0
Herediano	2022–23	Liga FPD	16	0	2	0	4	0	1	0	23	0
Herediano	Total		30	0	2	0	4	0	1	0	37	0
Saprissa	2022–23	Liga FPD	3	0	—		—		—		3	0
Saprissa	2023–24	Liga FPD	7	0	1	0	8	0	1	0	17	0
Saprissa	2024–25	Liga FPD	45	0	1	0	10	0	1	0	57	0
Saprissa	Total		55	0	2	0	18	0	2	0	77	0
Career total			314	0	39	0	55	0	8	0	416	0

=== International ===
As of match played 22 January 2025

Appearances and goals by national team and year
National team	Year	Apps	Goals
Costa Rica	2010	1	0
Costa Rica	2011	1	0
Costa Rica	2014	1	0
Costa Rica	2015	8	0
Costa Rica	2016	1	0
Costa Rica	2018	3	0
Costa Rica	2019	3	0
Costa Rica	2020	1	0
Costa Rica	2021	3	0
Costa Rica	2022	3	0
Costa Rica	2025	1	0
Total		26	0

== Honours ==
Saprissa

- Liga FPD: Clausura 2010

AZ Alkmaar

- KNVB Cup: 2012–13

CS Herediano

- Liga FPD: Apertura 2019

Individual

- 2009 FIFA U-20 World Cup: Golden Glove Award
