= Jan Wuytens =

Belgian footballer

Personal information
- Full name: Jan Wuytens
- Date of birth: 9 June 1985 (age 41)
- Place of birth: Hasselt, Belgium
- Height: 1.89 m (6 ft 2 in)
- Position: Centre back

Youth career
- 1997–2004: PSV

Senior career*
Years	Team	Apps	(Gls)
2004–2005	PSV	0	(0)
2005–2009	Heracles Almelo	79	(5)
2009–2013	Utrecht	126	(6)
2013–2016	AZ	33	(0)
2017–2018	KSC Hasselt		

Managerial career
- 2017–2018: KSC Hasselt (assistant)
- * Club domestic league appearances and goals

Jan Wuytens (Dutch pronunciation: [jɑɱ ˈʋœytəns]; born 9 June 1985) is a Belgian former professional footballer who played as a centre back.

== Career ==
Wuytens is a defender who was born in Hasselt and began his career with PSV Eindhoven in 1997. He left after seven years and joined Heracles Almelo, making his professional debut in the 2005–06 season. On 15 June 2009 league rivals FC Utrecht bought the defender for €900,000.

On 2 August 2016, his contract until 2017 was terminated. He joined KSC Hasselt as a player-assistant in 2017. In June 2018, Wuytens became a youth coach with Genk.

== International career ==
He is a former Belgium Under-19 international.

== Personal ==
Jan is also the cousin of Stijn Wuytens, who plays professionally for AZ Alkmaar.
