= Gertjan Verbeek =

Dutch footballer and manager

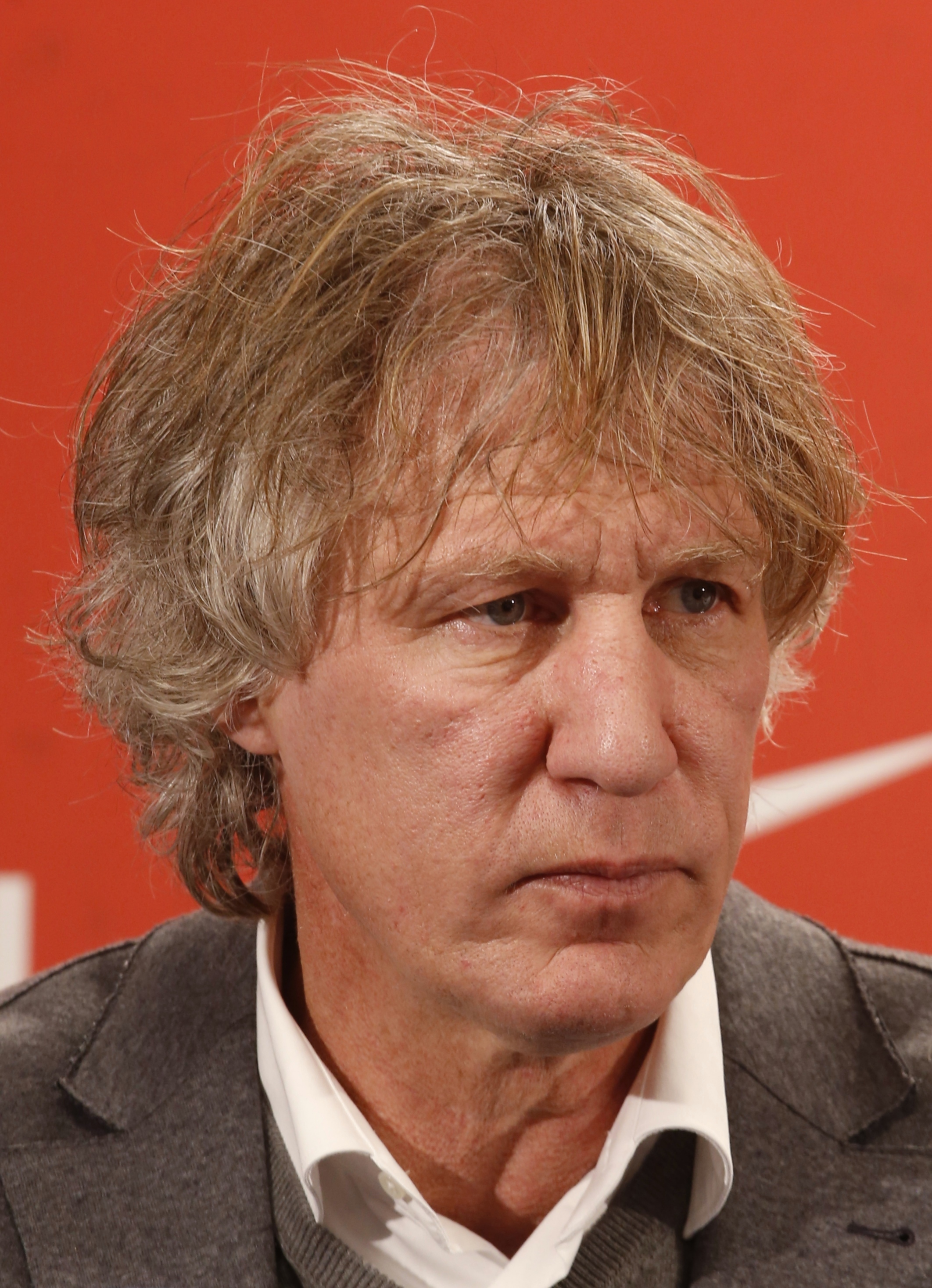
- Verbeek in 2016

Personal information
- Full name: Gerrit Jan Alfons Verbeek
- Date of birth: 1 August 1962 (age 64)
- Place of birth: Deventer, Netherlands
- Position: Defender

Youth career
- VV Zuid Eschmarke
- –1982: ATC '65
- 1982–1984: Achilles '12

Senior career*
Years	Team	Apps	(Gls)
1984–1994	Heerenveen	254	(38)
1986–1987	→ SC Heracles (loan)	31	(9)
Total		285	(47)

Managerial career
- 2001–2004: Heracles Almelo
- 2004–2008: Heerenveen
- 2008–2009: Feyenoord
- 2009–2010: Heracles Almelo
- 2010–2013: AZ Alkmaar
- 2013–2014: 1. FC Nürnberg
- 2014–2017: VfL Bochum
- 2017–2018: FC Twente
- 2019–2020: Adelaide United
- 2021: Almere City
- * Club domestic league appearances and goals

Gertjan Verbeek (Dutch pronunciation: [ˈɣɛrtɕɑɱ vərˈbeːk]; born 1 August 1962) is a Dutch former professional footballer who last managed Eerste Divisie side Almere City.

== Coaching career ==
=== Netherlands ===
After retiring from his playing career in 1994, Verbeek stayed with SC Heerenveen as an assistant-coach. He left for Heracles Almelo in 2001, and after a successful stint there was hired as the successor to Foppe de Haan with SC Heerenveen. In 2008, he was hired by Feyenoord, but was fired after clashing with players a few months into his tenure. He moved to Heracles Almelo for the 2009–2010 season, and after guiding them to a 6th-place finish in the Eredivisie, AZ hired him for the 2010–2011 season. Verbeek caused controversy in December 2011 in a 2011–12 KNVB Cup match against Ajax by leading AZ off the pitch in protest at having their goalkeeper Esteban Alvarado sent off for retaliating against a pitch invader. The game was consequently abandoned. On 29 September 2013, AZ fired him due to lack of chemistry with the players.

=== Germany ===
The German football club 1. FC Nürnberg hired him on 22 October 2013, giving him the first coaching opportunity outside of Netherlands, with a contract until 30 June 2015. However, he was sacked on 23 April 2014. On 22 December 2014, the VfL Bochum announced signing Verbeek as head coach, starting 1 January 2015. In his return to Nuremberg on 23 March 2015, Bochum defeated 1. FC Nürnberg 2–1. He was sacked on 11 July 2017.

=== FC Twente ===
On 29 October 2017 he returned to management in his native Holland, where he signed with FC Twente, which was going through a disastrous campaign of the 2017-18 Eredivisie. On 26 March, after 149 days, Verbeek was fired as FC Twente's manager, with the team at the bottom of the table with six games remaining of the season.

=== Adelaide United ===
On 23 May 2019, Verbeek was officially announced as Marco Kurz' replacement as manager for A-League club Adelaide United. Verbeek led Adelaide United to their third FFA Cup victory by defeating Melbourne City 4–0 at Coopers Stadium. Due to the COVID-19 pandemic, Verbeek took a leave of absence to return home to the Netherlands indefinitely while still being under contract with the club. Verbeek and Adelaide United decided to mutually part ways on 29 April 2020.

== Career statistics ==
=== Playing career ===
Club performance			League		Cup		Total	
Season	Club	League	Apps	Goals	Apps	Goals	Apps	Goals
Netherlands			League		KNVB Cup		Total	
1984–85	Heerenveen	Eerste Divisie	21	6				
1985–86	Heerenveen	Eerste Divisie	22	1				
1986–87	SC Heracles	Eerste Divisie	31	9				
1987–88	Heerenveen	Eerste Divisie	31	3				
1988–89	Heerenveen	Eerste Divisie	30	4				
1989–90	Heerenveen	Eerste Divisie	34	10				
1990–91	Heerenveen	Eredivisie	30	2				
1991–92	Heerenveen	Eerste Divisie	32	6				
1992–93	Heerenveen	Eerste Divisie	29	5				
1993–94	Heerenveen	Eredivisie	25	1				
Total	Netherlands		285	47				
Career total			285	47				

=== Coaching record ===
As of match played 27 March 2020

Team	From	To	Record					
Team	From	To	G	W	D	L	Win %	Ref.
Heracles Almelo	1 July 2001	30 June 2004	117	60	22	35	51.28	
Heerenveen	1 July 2004	30 June 2008	176	83	34	59	47.16	
Feyenoord	1 July 2008	14 January 2009	26	8	4	14	30.77	
Heracles Almelo	1 July 2009	30 June 2010	39	19	6	14	48.72	
AZ	1 July 2010	29 September 2013	157	76	33	48	48.41	
1. FC Nürnberg	22 October 2013	23 April 2014	22	5	5	12	22.73	
VfL Bochum	22 December 2014	11 July 2017	88	31	30	27	35.23	
FC Twente	29 October 2017	26 March 2018	21	2	8	11	9.52	
Adelaide United	23 May 2019	29 April 2020	26	14	0	12	53.85	
Total			672	298	142	232	44.35	—

== Honours ==
AZ

- KNVB Cup: 2012–13

Adelaide

- FFA Cup: 2019
