= Donny Gorter =

Dutch footballer (born 1988)

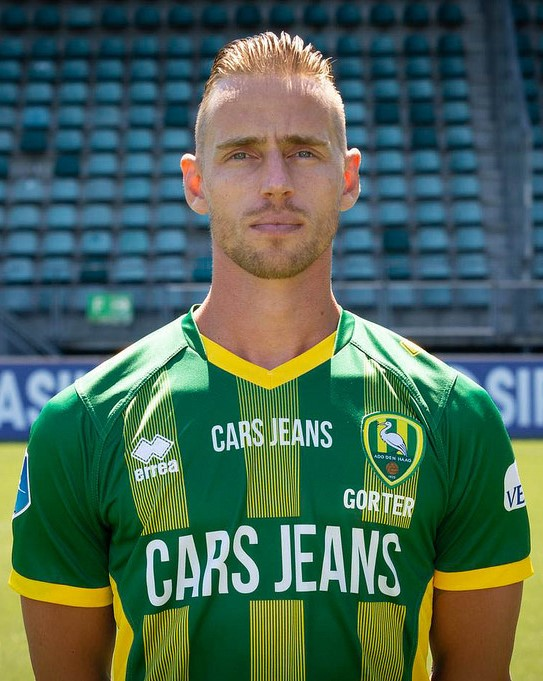
- Donny Gorter in 2018

Personal information
- Date of birth: 15 June 1988 (age 38)
- Place of birth: Lugano, Switzerland
- Height: 1.75 m (5 ft 9 in)
- Positions: Left back; midfielder

Youth career
- RKSV Rood-Wit
- NAC
- PSV

Senior career*
Years	Team	Apps	(Gls)
2007–2012	NAC	111	(10)
2012–2015	AZ	34	(1)
2014–2015	→ AaB (loan)	9	(0)
2015–2016	NAC	25	(0)
2016–2017	Viborg	1	(0)
2017–2020	ADO Den Haag	30	(0)
2020–2021	Halsteren	3	(0)
Total		213	(11)

International career
2006	Netherlands U18	2	(0)
2007	Netherlands U19	3	(0)
2010	Netherlands U21	4	(0)
- * Club domestic league appearances and goals

Donny Gorter (born 15 June 1988) is a Dutch retired footballer who plays as a left back. He formerly played for NAC Breda, AZ, AaB, Viborg FF and ADO Den Haag. He is the son of former footballer Edwin Gorter.

== Career ==
Gorter's first season with AaB ended when he tore his cruciate ligament in the last Europa League group game against Rio Ave on 11 December 2014.

He finished his professional career in 2020 when he joined amateur side Halsteren.

== International career ==
Gorter was a youth international for the Netherlands.

== Career statistics ==
As of match played 22 December 2019.

Club	Season	League			Cup		Europe		Other		Total	
Club	Season	Division	Apps	Goals	Apps	Goals	Apps	Goals	Apps	Goals	Apps	Goals
NAC Breda	2007–08	Eredivisie	1	0	0	0	0	0	0	0	1	0
NAC Breda	2008–09	Eredivisie	32	3	1	0	0	0	0	0	33	3
NAC Breda	2009–10	Eredivisie	29	2	3	2	6	0	0	0	38	4
NAC Breda	2010–11	Eredivisie	31	4	4	0	0	0	0	0	35	4
NAC Breda	2011–12	Eredivisie	22	2	1	0	0	0	0	0	23	2
NAC Breda	Total		115	11	9	3	6	0	0	0	130	14
AZ	2012–13	Eredivisie	23	1	5	0	2	0	0	0	29	1
AZ	2013–14	Eredivisie	11	0	2	0	2	1	0	0	15	1
AZ	Total		34	1	7	0	4	1	0	0	45	2
AaB (loan)	2014-15	Danish Superliga	9	0	1	0	7	0	0	0	17	0
NAC Breda	2015-16	Eerste Divisie	25	0	1	0	0	0	4	0	30	0
Viborg FF	2016-17	Danish Superliga	1	0	0	0	0	0	0	0	1	0
ADO Den Haag	2016–17	Eredivisie	10	0	0	0	0	0	0	0	10	0
ADO Den Haag	2017–18	Eredivisie	18	0	1	0	0	0	0	0	19	0
ADO Den Haag	2018–19	Eredivisie	2	0	0	0	0	0	0	0	2	0
ADO Den Haag	2019–20	Eredivisie	0	0	0	0	0	0	0	0	0	0
Career total			214	12	19	2	17	1	4	0	254	15

== Honours ==
=== Club ===
AZ

- KNVB Cup: 2012-13
