= Fernando Lewis =

Aruban footballer (born 1993)

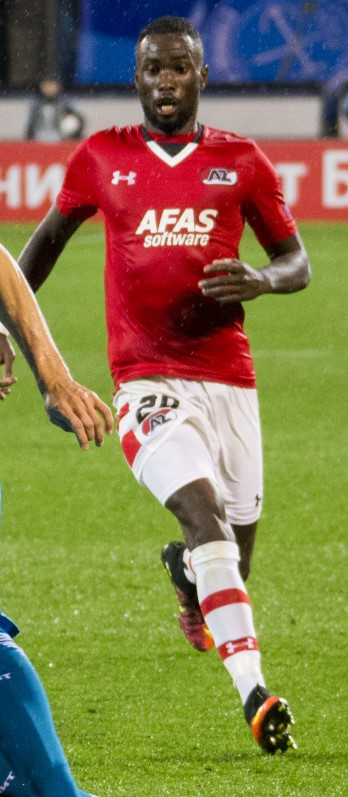
- Lewis with AZ in 2016

Personal information
- Full name: Fernando Frederick Roy Lewis
- Date of birth: 31 January 1993 (age 33)
- Place of birth: Haarlem, Netherlands
- Height: 1.80 m (5 ft 11 in)
- Positions: Right back; right winger

Youth career
- Ajax
- HFC Haarlem
- AZ

Senior career*
Years	Team	Apps	(Gls)
2011–2017	AZ	10	(0)
2014	→ Go Ahead Eagles (loan)	17	(2)
2015	→ Dordrecht (loan)	7	(0)
2016–2017	Jong AZ	14	(5)
2017–2020	Willem II	56	(2)
2020–2022	Quick Boys	24	(3)
2022–2023	OFC	2	(0)

International career
2011	Netherlands U19	3	(1)
2021–2024	Aruba	12	(0)
- * Club domestic league appearances and goals as of 16:11, 15 January 2026 (UTC)

Fernando Frederick Roy Lewis (born 31 January 1993) is a professional footballer who plays as a right back. Born in the Netherlands, he represents the Aruba national football team.

== Club career ==
On 19 August 2020, Lewis joined Tweede Divisie side Quick Boys on a free transfer, signing a one-year deal.

== International career ==
Lewis made his Aruba national football team debut on 2 June 2021 in the 2022 FIFA World Cup qualification game against Cayman Islands.
