= Celso Ortiz =

Paraguayan footballer (born 1989)

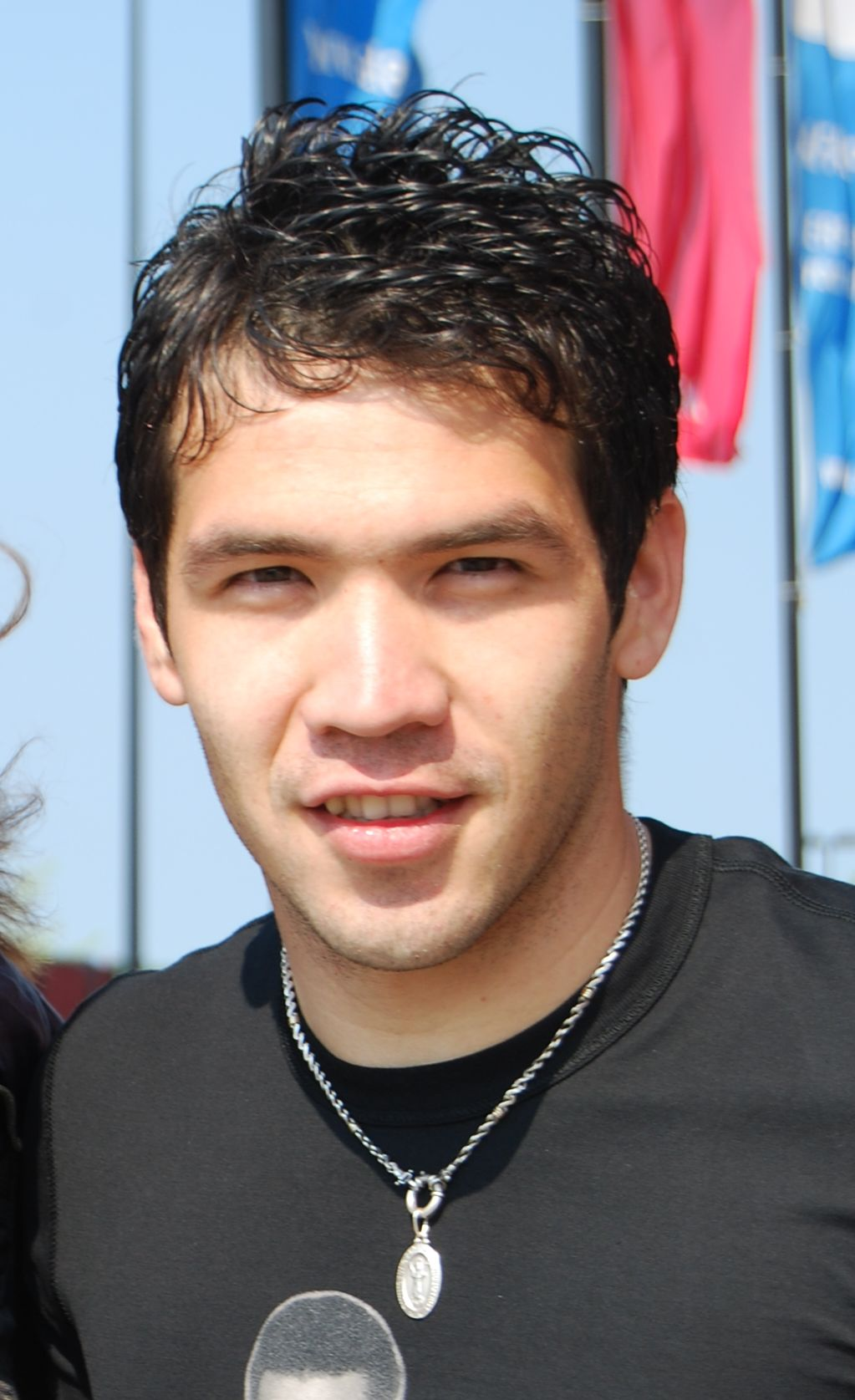
- Ortiz in 2011

Personal information
- Full name: Celso Fabián Ortiz Gamarra
- Date of birth: 26 January 1989 (age 37)
- Place of birth: Asunción, Paraguay
- Height: 1.74 m (5 ft 9 in)
- Position: Midfielder

Youth career
- 2005–2007: Cerro Porteño

Senior career*
Years	Team	Apps	(Gls)
2007–2010	Cerro Porteño	46	(7)
2010–2016	AZ Alkmaar	100	(2)
2016–2023	Monterrey	264	(4)
2023–2024	Pachuca	11	(0)
2025	Nacional	17	(0)

International career^{‡}
2007–2009	Paraguay U20	10	(3)
2010–2019	Paraguay	22	(0)
- * Club domestic league appearances and goals as of 13 August 2025 ‡ National team caps and goals as of 9 October 2020 (UTC)

Celso Fabián Ortiz Gamarra (born 26 January 1989) is a Paraguayan professional footballer who plays as a midfielder.

== Career ==
On 26 August 2009, AZ Alkmaar secured the services of the Paraguayan football midfielder. The Dutch club have signed him from Cerro Porteño on a five-year deal. Ortiz joined AZ in January 2010. On 6 June 2016, Monterrey coach Antonio Mohamed announced that Ortiz would be their first signing ahead of the Apertura 2016.

== International career ==
Ortiz was a member of the Paraguay national under-20 football team and represented the team at 2009 FIFA U-20 World Cup held in Egypt.

He was selected in the final 23-man squad for the 2019 Copa América, playing the full 90 minutes in the quarterfinal loss against host Brazil.

== Honours ==
AZ Alkmaar

- KNVB Cup: 2012–13

Monterrey

- Liga MX: Apertura 2019
- Copa MX: Apertura 2017, 2019–20
- CONCACAF Champions League: 2019, 2021

Pachuca

- CONCACAF Champions Cup: 2024
