= 2011–12 AZ Alkmaar season =

AZ Alkmaar
2011–12 season
- Chairman: René Neelissen
- Manager: Gertjan Verbeek
- Eredivisie: 4th
- KNVB Cup: Semi-finals
- UEFA Europa League: Quarter-finals
- Top goalscorer: League: Jozy Altidore (16); All: Jozy Altidore (20)
Home colours	Away colours

The 2011–12 AZ Alkmaar season was the club's 45th season of existence, and their 14th season in the Eredivisie, the top-flight of Dutch football.

== Club ==
=== First team ===
As of 1 August 2011

Note: Flags indicate national team as defined under FIFA eligibility rules; some limited exceptions apply. Players may hold more than one non-FIFA nationality.

No.	Pos.	Nation	Player
3	DF	NED	Dirk Marcellis
4	DF	NED	Nick Viergever
6	DF	NED	Etiënne Reijnen
7	FW	ISL	Jóhann Berg Guðmundsson
8	MF	NED	Adam Maher
9	FW	NED	Ruud Boymans
10	MF	NED	Erik Falkenburg
11	MF	BEL	Maarten Martens
14	DF	EST	Ragnar Klavan
15	DF	DEN	Simon Poulsen
16	MF	SWE	Pontus Wernbloom
17	FW	USA	Jozy Altidore
20	MF	SWE	Rasmus Elm
21	GK	NED	Erik Heijblok
23	FW	NED	Roy Beerens

No.	Pos.	Nation	Player
24	DF	NED	Erik Schouten
25	DF	FIN	Niklas Moisander (captain)
26	MF	PAR	Celso Ortiz
27	FW	AUS	Brett Holman
28	DF	FIN	Thomas Lam
30	MF	AUS	James Holland
31	GK	FIN	Niki Mäenpää
32	DF	NED	Giliano Wijnaldum
34	GK	CRC	Esteban Alvarado
35	FW	NED	Charlison Benschop
36	MF	MAR	Ali Messaoud
37	GK	NED	Hobie Verhulst
39	DF	NED	Milan Hoek
41	DF	NED	Toine van Huizen

== Competitions ==
=== Eredivisie ===
==== League table ====
Pos	Team	Pld	W	D	L	GF	GA	GD	Pts	Qualification or relegation
2	Feyenoord	34	21	7	6	70	37	+33	70	Qualification to Champions League third qualifying round
3	PSV	34	21	6	7	87	47	+40	69	Qualification to Europa League play-off round (Note: PSV qualified for the play-off round of the 2012–13 UEFA Europa League after winning the 2011–12 KNVB Cup. As they finished third in the league, all Europa League berths and play-off places were moved down one spot from the original scheme.)
4	AZ	34	19	8	7	64	35	+29	65	Qualification to Europa League play-off round
5	Heerenveen	34	18	10	6	79	59	+20	64	Qualification to Europa League third qualifying round
6	Twente	34	17	9	8	82	46	+36	60	Qualification to European competition play-offs and Europa League first qualifying round (Note: Twente qualified for the first qualifying round of the 2012–13 UEFA Europa League based on the 2011–12 UEFA Respect Fair Play ranking, which awarded one extra qualifying spot to the Netherlands. This allowed qualification for Twente despite their loss in the European competition Playoffs.)

Source: Eredivisie (official site) (in Dutch)
Rules for classification: 1) points; 2) goal difference; 3) number of goals scored.

==== Matches ====
7 August 2011 1	AZ	3–1	PSV	Alkmaar
11:30	Martens 26'; Moisander (yellow card) 38' (yellow-red card) 82'; Viergever 40'; Altidore 80', (yellow card) 88'	Summary	Mertens 45+2'; Ojo (yellow card) 61'; Pieters (yellow card) 76'	Stadium: AFAS Stadion; Attendance: 16,298; Referee: Eric Braamhaar (Netherlands)

13 August 2011 2	Twente	2–0	AZ	Enschede
17:45	Janko 3'; Ruiz 66'	Summary		Stadium: De Grolsch Veste; Attendance: 24,800; Referee: Pieter Vink (Netherlands)

21 August 2011 3	AZ	4–0	NEC	Alkmaar
13:30	Altidore 54', 73'; Elm 64' (pen.); Moisander 85'	Summary	Čmovš (red card) 63'; Van Eijden (yellow card) 75'; Schøne (yellow card) 79'	Stadium: AFAS Stadion; Attendance: 15,589; Referee: Pol van Boekel (Netherlands)

28 August 2011 4	Groningen	0–3	AZ	Groningen
13:30	Holla (yellow card) 30'	Summary	Viergever 1'; Holman (yellow card) 27'; Wernbloom (yellow card) 38'; Altidore (yellow card) 68'; Elm (yellow card) 75', (goal) 84'; Guðmundsson 79'; Falkenburg (yellow card) 90'	Stadium: Euroborg; Attendance: 22,128; Referee: Kevin Blom (Netherlands)

10 September 2011 5	AZ	4–0	Vitesse	Alkmaar
18:45	Wernbloom 22', 26'; Beerens 38'; Elm 45' (pen.); Viergever (yellow card) 47'	Summary	Hofs (yellow card) 15'; Van der Struijk (yellow card) 44'; Bony (yellow card) 45' (yellow-red card) 70'; Jenner (yellow card) 70'	Stadium: AFAS Stadion; Attendance: 16,000; Referee: Bjorn Kuipers (Netherlands)

18 September 2011 6	RKC Waalwijk	1–2	AZ	Waalwijk
13:30	Ramos (yellow card) 9'; Castillion 45+1'; Castillion (yellow card) 71'	Summary	Elm 10' (pen.), (yellow card) 11'; Marcellis (yellow card) 21'; Wernbloom (yellow card) 39'; Benschop 65'; Alvarado (yellow card) 89'	Stadium: Mandemakers Stadion; Attendance: 5,500; Referee: Richard Liesveld (Netherlands)

25 September 2011 7	AZ	2–1	Feyenoord	Alkmaar
11:30	Elm 60'; Holman 85'; Wernbloom (yellow card) 90'	Summary	Bakkal 36'; Schaken (yellow card) 54'; De Vrij (yellow card) 60'; Leerdam (red card) 68'; Martins Indi (yellow card) 77'; El Ahmadi (yellow card) 90'	Stadium: AFAS Stadion; Attendance: 16,773; Referee: Pol van Boekel (Netherlands)

2 October 2011 8	VVV	1–3	AZ	Venlo
11:30	Cullen 90+1'	Summary	Elm 32'; Marcellis (yellow card) 54'; Maher 62'; Poulsen 73'	Stadium: Seacon Stadion; Attendance: 7,350; Referee: Luc Wouters (Belgium)

15 October 2011 9	Ajax	2–2	AZ	Amsterdam
17:45	Enoh (yellow card) 43' (yellow-red card) 70'; Ooijer (yellow card) 44'; Sulejmani 47' (pen.); Janssen (yellow card) 70', (goal) 82'; Anita (yellow card) 79'	Summary	Holman 14', (yellow card) 35'; Beerens 22'; Moisander (yellow card) 29'; Maher (yellow card) 89'	Stadium: Amsterdam Arena; Attendance: 51,585; Referee: Bjorn Kuipers (Netherlands)

23 October 2011 10	AZ	1–0	Roda JC	Alkmaar
13:30	Elm 51'; Altidore (yellow card) 63'	Summary	Wielaert (yellow card) 19'; Fledderus (yellow card) 38' (yellow-red card) 51'; Monteyne (yellow card) 48'; Hempte (yellow card) 68'	Stadium: AFAS Stadion; Attendance: 16,200; Referee: Danny Makkelie (Netherlands)

30 October 2011 11	Heracles Almelo	0–1	AZ	Almelo
15:30		Summary	Klavan (yellow card) 56'; Maher 89'	Stadium: Polman Stadion; Attendance: 8,500; Referee: Richard Liesveld (Netherlands)

6 November 2011 12	AZ	3–0	ADO Den Haag	Alkmaar
13:30	Holman 11'; Elm (yellow card) 51'; Maher 64'; Wernbloom (yellow card) 67'; Altidore 83'	Summary	Immers (yellow card) 18'; Mörec (yellow card) 34'; Toornstra (yellow card) 84'	Stadium: AFAS Stadion; Attendance: 16,222; Referee: Serdar Gözübüyük (Netherlands)

7 December 2011 13	Excelsior	0–0	AZ	Rotterdam
18:30	De Graaf (yellow card) 32'	Summary	Moisander (yellow card) 50'	Stadium: Stadion Woudestein; Attendance: 3,500; Referee: Kevin Blom (Netherlands)

25 November 2011 14	AZ	2–0	Utrecht	Alkmaar
19:00	Wernbloom (yellow card) 19'; Moisander (yellow card) 43'; Elm 67'; Guðmundsson 89'	Summary	Bulthuis (yellow card) 20'; Mårtensson (yellow card) 38'; De Kogel (yellow card) 59'; Wuytens (yellow card) 66'	Stadium: AFAS Stadion; Attendance: 16,000; Referee: Ed Janssen (Netherlands)

4 December 2011 15	Heerenveen	5–1	AZ	Heerenveen
15:30	Dost 14'; Van La Parra 31'; Đuričić 46'; Zomer 48'; Narsingh 74'	Summary	Altidore 20'; Holman (yellow card) 43'; Klavan (yellow card) 82'	Stadium: Abe Lenstra Stadion; Attendance: 25,000; Referee: Eric Braamhaar (Netherlands)

10 December 2011 16	AZ	4–0	De Graafschap	Alkmaar
18:45	Maher 22'; Poulsen 31'; Wormgoor 54' (o.g.); Benschop 79'	Summary		Stadium: AFAS Stadion; Attendance: 16,198; Referee: Richard Liesveld (Netherlands)

18 December 2011 17	NAC Breda	2–1	AZ	Breda
13:30	Lurling 31'; Gilissen (yellow card) 87'; Koenders 90'; Koenders (yellow card) 90+1'	Summary	Holman 45'	Stadium: Rat Verlegh Stadion; Attendance: 17,720; Referee: Danny Makkelie (Netherlands)

22 January 2012 18	AZ	1–1	Ajax	Alkmaar
13:30	Elm 37'	Summary	Poulsen 75' (o.g.)	Stadium: AFAS Stadion; Attendance: 16,761; Referee: Pieter Vink (Netherlands)

28 January 2012 19	Roda JC	2–0	AZ	Kerkrade
19:45	Malki 10'; Junker 33'; Vuković (yellow card) 36'; Wielaert (yellow card) 52'	Summary	Moisander (yellow card) 65'; Altidore (yellow card) 80'	Stadium: Limburg Stadion; Attendance: 14,655; Referee: Serdar Gözübüyük (Netherlands)

4 February 2012 20	ADO Den Haag	0–6	AZ	The Hague
17:45	Supusepa (yellow card) 39'	Summary	Benschop 33', 47', 69'; Martens 73'; Altidore 85', 88'	Stadium: Kyocera Stadion; Attendance: 8,756; Referee: Kevin Blom

11 February 2012 21	AZ	2–0	Excelsior	Alkmaar
17:45	Martens 58', 60'	Summary		Stadium: AFAS Stadion; Attendance: 15,964; Referee: Jack Van Hulten

19 February 2012 22	Utrecht	3–0	AZ	Utrecht
14:30	Gerndt 15' (pen.), 21'; Demouge (yellow card) 23'; Duplan 41'; Van der Hoorn (yellow card) 90+1'		Moisander (red card) 15'; Marcellis (yellow card) 18'; Elm (yellow card) 39'	Stadium: Galgenwaard Stadion; Attendance: 19,500; Referee: Pol van Boekel

26 February 2012 23	AZ	3–3	Heerenveen	Alkmaar
16:30	Altidore 26', 58'; Falkenburg 83'	Summary	Kums (yellow card) 7'; Đuričić 55'; Alvarado 76' (o.g.); Narsingh 81'	Stadium: AFAS Stadion; Attendance: 16,763; Referee: Bjorn Kuipers

3 March 2012 24	AZ	3–1	Heracles Almelo	Alkmaar
14:45	Poulsen 31'; Altidore 43'; Maher 52'	Summary	Overtoom 56' (pen.)	Stadium: AFAS Stadion; Attendance: 16,078; Referee: Ruud Bossen

11 March 2012 25	De Graafschap	0–2	AZ	Alkmaar
11:30		Summary	Elm 64'; Falkenburg 90+2'	Stadium: De Vijverberg; Attendance: 12,145; Referee: Pieter Vink

18 March 2012 26	AZ	0–0	NAC Breda	Alkmaar
15:30	Reijnen (yellow card) 73'	Summary	Bonevacia (yellow card) 57'; Gilissen (yellow card) 87'	Stadium: AFAS Stadion; Attendance: 16,268; Referee: Jan Wegereef

25 March 2012 27	AZ	1–0	RKC Waalwijk	Alkmaar
11:30	Guðmundsson 49'	Summary		Stadium: AFAS Stadion; Attendance: 16,368; Referee: Jack Van Hulten

1 April 2012 28	Vitesse	2–2	AZ	Arnhem
15:30	Kashia 35', (yellow card) 38'; Van Ginkel 47'; Bony (yellow card) 66'	Summary	Martens (yellow card) 14'; Moisander (yellow card) 29'; Altidore 32'; Holman (yellow card) 38' (yellow-red card) 63'; Maher (yellow card) 46'; Poulsen 59'	Stadium: GelreDome; Attendance: 22,164; Referee: Danny Makkelie

11 April 2012 29	AZ	2–2	Twente	Alkmaar
18:00	Altidore 3', 70'; Marcellis (yellow card) 19'; Martens (yellow card) 26'	Summary	De Jong 31'; Douglas (yellow card) 39'; Rosales (yellow card) 73'; Röseler (yellow card) 76'; Bajrami 90'; Tiendalli (yellow card) 90+1'	Stadium: AFAS Stadion; Attendance: 16,801; Referee: Pieter Vink

14 April 2012 30	PSV	3–2	AZ	Eindhoven
17:45	Lens 17', 77', (yellow card) 45'; Strootman (yellow card) 42'; Labyad (yellow card) 45'; Toivonen (yellow card) 90+2'; Matavž 90+3'	Summary	Altidore 24'; Beerens 34'; Reijnen (yellow card) 68'	Stadium: Philips Stadion; Attendance: 34,200; Referee: Bjorn Kuipers

22 April 2012 31	AZ	2–1	VVV	Alkmaar
13:30	Moisander (yellow card) 23'; Holman 47'; Altidore 65'	Summary	Kruijsen 59'	Stadium: AFAS Stadion; Attendance: 16,459; Referee: Bas Nijhuis

29 April 2012 32	Feyenoord	1–0	AZ	Rotterdam
13:30	Clasie (yellow card) 3'; Bakkal 54'	Summary	Viergever (yellow card) 68'; Klavan (yellow card) 73'	Stadium: Stadion Feijenoord; Attendance: 48,000; Referee: Eric Braamhaar

2 May 2012 33	NEC	1-1	AZ	Nijmegen
19:00	Zeefuik 13'; Conboy (yellow card) 63'	Summary	Boymans 59'; Maher (yellow card) 70'	Stadium: Goffertstadion; Attendance: 12,498; Referee: Kevin Blom

6 May 2012 34	AZ	1–0	Groningen	Alkmaar
13:30	Falkenburg 26'	Summary	Kappelhof (yellow card) 73'	Stadium: AFAS Stadion; Attendance: 16,800; Referee: Pol Van Boekel

=== KNVB Cup ===
22 September 2011 2	AZ	4–2 (a.e.t.)	Groningen	Alkmaar
20:45 CET (UTC+01)	Klavan (yellow card) 74'; Viergever 76', (yellow card) 109'; Maher (yellow card) 84', (goal) 99'; Moisander 93'; Guðmundsson 115'	Summary	Texeira 6'; Sparv (yellow card) 23' (yellow-red card) 97'; Burnet (yellow card) 52'; Bacuna (yellow card) 90'; Van Loo (yellow card) 100'; Keurntjes 103'; Ivens (red card) 120'	Stadium: AFAS Stadion; Attendance: 7,160; Referee: Bas Nijhuis

27 October 2011 3	Dordrecht	2–3 (a.e.t.)	AZ	Dordrecht
18:45 CET (UTC+01)	Curiel 71'; Hulst 73'; Beugelsdijk (yellow card) 120+2'	Summary	Wernbloom 44'; Klavan 61'; Maher 97'; Alvarado (yellow card) 120+2'	Stadium: GN Bouw Stadion; Attendance: 3,287; Referee: Pieter Vink

19 January 2012 4	Ajax	2–3 (a.e.t.)	AZ	Amsterdam
14:30 CET (UTC+01)	De Jong 10', 37'	Summary	Martens 24'; Benschop 32'; Moisander (yellow card) 36'; Elm 55' (pen.); Holman (yellow card) 57'	Stadium: Amsterdam Arena; Attendance: 22,800; Referee: Pol Van Boekel

1 February 2012 Quarter-final	AZ	2–1	GVVV	Alkmaar
20:45 CET (UTC+01)	Martens 19', 66'	Summary	Van Meegdenburg 10'; Bonke (yellow card) 84'	Stadium: AFAS Stadion; Attendance: 9,137; Referee: Jan Wegereef

22 March 2012 Semi-final	AZ	2–4 (a.e.t.)	Heracles	Alkmaar
20:45 CET (UTC+01)	Maher 20'; Guðmundsson 22'; Klavan (yellow card) 81'	Summary	Everton 7'; Armenteros (yellow card) 47'; Quansah 66'; Bruns 110'; Telgenkamp (yellow card) 118'; Gouriye 120'	Stadium: AFAS Stadion; Attendance: 10,669; Referee: Richard Liesveld

=== UEFA Europa League ===
==== Qualification rounds ====
Third qualifying round

28 July 2011 First leg	AZ (Netherlands)	2–0	(Czech Republic) Baumit Jablonec	Alkmaar, Netherlands
20:00	Wernbloom 64'; Guðmundsson 88'	Report		Stadium: AFAS Stadion; Attendance: 8,871; Referee: Szymon Marciniak (Poland)

4 August 2011 Second leg	Baumit Jablonec (Czech Republic)	1–1 (1–3 agg.)	(Netherlands) AZ	Jablonec nad Nisou, Czech Republic
20:30	Loučka 80'	Report	Benschop 45'	Stadium: Stadion Střelnice; Attendance: 4,844; Referee: Viktor Shvetsov (Ukraine)

Play-off round

18 August 2011 First leg	Aalesund (Norway)	2–1	(Netherlands) AZ	Ålesund, Norway
19:00	Barrantes 13' (pen.), 73'; Morrison (yellow card) 51'	Report	Moisander (yellow card) 13'; Martens 30'; Benschop (yellow card) 87'	Stadium: Color Line Stadion; Attendance: 5,646; Referee: Stephan Studer (Switzerland)

25 August 2011 Second leg	AZ (Netherlands)	6–0 (7–2 agg.)	(Norway) Aalesund	Alkmaar, Netherlands
19:00	Wernbloom 7'; Altidore 25', 59'; Martens 54'; Holman 68'; Moisander 90' (pen.)	Report	Okronokwo (yellow card) 19'; Barrantes (yellow card) 57'; Jääger (yellow card) 59'; Phillips (red card) 62'; Jalasto (yellow card) 72'	Stadium: AFAS Stadion; Attendance: 11,814; Referee: Alan Kelly (Republic of Ireland)

==== Group stage ====
Group G Standings

Team	Pld	W	D	L	GF	GA	GD	Pts
(Ukraine) Metalist Kharkiv	6	4	2	0	15	6	+9	14
(Netherlands) AZ	6	1	5	0	10	7	+3	8
Austria Wien	6	2	2	2	10	11	−1	8
(Sweden) Malmö FF	6	0	1	5	4	15	−11	1

Match reports

15 September 2011 Group G	AZ (Netherlands)	4–1	(Sweden) Malmö FF	Alkmaar, Netherlands
21:05	Altidore 21'; Elm 32' (pen.); Beerens (yellow card) 35'; Maher 39'; Holman 49'; Reijnen (yellow card) 72'; Alvarado (yellow card) 75'	Report	Pekalski (yellow card) 16'; Ricardinho (yellow card) 31'; Larsson 72' (pen.)	Stadium: AFAS Stadion; Attendance: 11,905; Referee: Ivan Bebek (Croatia)

29 September 2011 Group G	(Ukraine) Metalist Kharkiv	1–1	AZ (Netherlands)	Kharkiv, Ukraine
19:00	Torres (yellow card) 39'; Gueye (yellow card) 60'; Taison 76', (yellow card) 90+2'	Report	Altidore 26', (yellow card) 28'; Wernbloom (yellow card) 44'; Poulsen (yellow card) 59'; Elm (yellow card) 62'	Stadium: Metalist Stadium; Attendance: 37,122; Referee: (Poland) Marcin Borski

20 October 2011 Group G	AZ (Netherlands)	2–2	Austria Wien	Alkmaar, Netherlands
19:00	Moisander (yellow card) 13' (yellow-red card) 90+2'; Wernbloom (yellow card) 42', (goal) 83'; Hlinka 80' (o.g.); Poulsen (yellow card) 90+3'	Report	Gorgon 29'; Marcellis 18' (o.g.)	Stadium: AFAS Stadion; Attendance: 15,321; Referee: (Romania) Alexandru Tudor

3 November 2011 Group G	Austria Wien	2–2	AZ (Netherlands)	Vienna, Austria
20:05	Ortlechner 58'; Barazite 61'; Junuzović (yellow card) 63'; Mader (yellow card) 73'	Report	Elm 19' (pen.); Wernbloom 44', (yellow card) 69'; Viergever (yellow card) 52'	Stadium: Franz Horr Stadium; Attendance: 10,450; Referee: (France) Tony Chapron

30 November 2011 Group G	(Sweden) Malmö FF	0–0	AZ (Netherlands)	Malmö, Sweden
19:00 CET (UTC+01)	Durmaz (yellow card) 67'; Figueiredo (yellow card) 75'	Report		Stadium: Swedbank Stadion; Attendance: 7,632; Referee: (Northern Ireland) Mark Courtney

15 December 2011 Group G	AZ (Netherlands)	1–1	(Ukraine) Metalist Kharkiv	Alkmaar, Netherlands
21:05 CET (UTC+01)	Maher 37'; Guðmundsson (yellow card) 52'	Report	Devych 37'; Torsiglieri (yellow card) 45+2'; Shelayev (yellow card) 54'; Blanco (yellow card) 63'	Stadium: AFAS Stadion; Attendance: 13,268; Referee: (Spain) Carlos Clos Gomez

==== Knock-out round ====
===== Round of 32 =====
16 February 2012 First leg	(Netherlands) AZ	1–0	(Belgium) Anderlecht	Alkmaar
19:00 CET (UTC+01)	Maher 35'; Marcellis (yellow card) 80'; Guðmundsson (yellow card) 89'	Report	Suárez (yellow card) 84'; Mbokani (yellow card) 89'	Stadium: AFAS Stadion; Attendance: 13,744; Referee: (Germany) Florian Meyer

23 February 2012 Second leg	(Belgium) Anderlecht	0–1 (0–2 agg.)	(Netherlands) AZ	Brussels
21:05 CET (UTC+01)	Kljestan (yellow card) 54'; Juhász (yellow card) 60'; Mbokani (yellow card) 70'; Wasilewski (yellow card) 78'	Report	Marcellis (yellow card) 33'; Martens (yellow card) 53', (goal) 54'; Moisander (yellow card) 85'	Stadium: Constant Vanden Stock Stadium; Attendance: 25,000; Referee: (Portugal) Pedro Garcia Proenca

===== Round of 16 =====
8 March 2012 First leg	(Netherlands) AZ	2–0	(Italy) Udinese	Alkmaar
21:05 CET (UTC+01)	Martens 63'; Elm (yellow card) 75'; Falkenburg 84'	Report	Domizzi (yellow card) 57'; Pazienza (yellow card) 84'; Danilo (yellow card) 90+1'	Stadium: AFAS Stadion; Attendance: 12,579; Referee: (Spain) David Fernandez Borbalan

15 March 2012 Second leg	(Italy) Udinese	2–1 (2–3 agg.)	(Netherlands) AZ	Udine
19:00 CET (UTC+01)	Di Natale 3' (pen.), 15'; Pasquale (yellow card) 39'; Domizzi (yellow card) 63'; Pazienza (yellow card) 73'; Pinzi (yellow card) 90+4'	Report	Viergever (red card) 3'; Falkenburg 31'; Altidore (yellow card) 55'; Maher (yellow card) 65'	Stadium: Stadio Friuli; Attendance: 13,300; Referee: (Serbia) Milorad Mažić

===== Quarter-finals =====
29 March 2012 First leg	(Netherlands) AZ	2–1	(Spain) Valencia	Alkmaar
21:05 CET (UTC+01)	Holman 45+1'; Martens 79'; Maher (yellow card) 87'	Report	Topal 52'; Barragán (yellow card) 64'; Dealbert (yellow card) 88'	Stadium: AFAS Stadion; Attendance: 16,100; Referee: (England) Martin Atkinson

5 April 2012 Second leg	(Spain) Valencia	4–0 (5–2 agg.)	(Netherlands) AZ	Valencia
21:05 CET (UTC+01)	T. Costa (yellow card) 4'; Rami 15', 17'; Alba 56'; Barragán (yellow card) 74'; Hernández 80'	Report		Stadium: Mestalla Stadium; Attendance: 25,000; Referee: (Czech Republic) Pavel Kralovec
