= 2020–21 PSV Eindhoven season =

PSV Eindhoven
2020–21 season
- General manager: Toon Gerbrands
- Chairman: Jan Albers
- Head coach: Roger Schmidt
- Stadium: Philips Stadion
- Eredivisie: 2nd
- KNVB Cup: Quarter-finals
- UEFA Europa League: Round of 32
- Top goalscorer: League: Donyell Malen (19); All: Donyell Malen (27)
Home colours	Away colours	Third colours

The 2020–21 season was PSV Eindhoven's 108th season in existence and the club's 65th consecutive season in the top flight of Dutch football. In addition to the domestic league, PSV participated in this season's edition of the KNVB Cup and also participated in the UEFA Europa League. The season covers the period from 1 July 2020 to 30 June 2021.

== Players ==
=== First-team squad ===
As of 1 February 2021

Note: Flags indicate national team as defined under FIFA eligibility rules; some limited exceptions apply. Players may hold more than one non-FIFA nationality.

No.	Pos.	Nation	Player
4	DF	NED	Nick Viergever
5	DF	GER	Timo Baumgartl
6	MF	CIV	Ibrahim Sangaré
7	FW	ISR	Eran Zahavi
9	FW	NED	Donyell Malen (vice-captain)
10	MF	NED	Mohamed Ihattaren
11	MF	GER	Adrian Fein (on loan from Bayern Munich)
13	GK	GER	Lars Unnerstall
14	MF	NED	Marco van Ginkel (on loan from Chelsea)
15	MF	MEX	Érick Gutiérrez
16	GK	GER	Vincent Müller
17	MF	BRA	Mauro Júnior
18	MF	NED	Pablo Rosario
19	FW	NED	Cody Gakpo

No.	Pos.	Nation	Player
20	FW	ARG	Maximiliano Romero
21	GK	BEL	Maxime Delanghe
22	DF	NED	Denzel Dumfries (captain)
23	FW	ENG	Noni Madueke
24	DF	NED	Armando Obispo
27	MF	GER	Mario Götze
28	DF	FRA	Olivier Boscagli
29	FW	NED	Joël Piroe
30	MF	NZL	Ryan Thomas
31	DF	GER	Philipp Max
33	DF	NED	Jordan Teze
38	GK	SUI	Yvon Mvogo (on loan from RB Leipzig)
53	FW	BEL	Yorbe Vertessen

==== Players out on loan ====
Note: Flags indicate national team as defined under FIFA eligibility rules; some limited exceptions apply. Players may hold more than one non-FIFA nationality.

No.	Pos.	Nation	Player
—	DF	NED	Derrick Luckassen (at Kasımpaşa until 30 June 2021)
—	MF	CZE	Michal Sadílek (at Slovan Liberec until 30 June 2021)

No.	Pos.	Nation	Player
—	FW	POR	Bruma (at Olympiacos until 30 June 2021)
—	MF	JPN	Ritsu Doan (at Arminia Bielefeld until 30 June 2021)

== Transfers ==
=== In ===
No.	Pos	Player	Transferred from	Fee	Date	Source
38	GK	(Switzerland) Yvon Mvogo	(Germany) RB Leipzig	Loan	25 August 2020	
31	DF	(Germany) Philipp Max	(Germany) FC Augsburg	€ 8,000,000	2 September 2020	
7	FW	(Israel) Eran Zahavi	(China) Guangzhou R&F	Free	20 September 2020	
16	GK	(Germany) Vincent Müller	(Germany) Würzburger Kickers	€ 500,000	23 September 2020	
6	MF	(Ivory Coast) Ibrahim Sangaré	(France) Toulouse	€ 9,000,000	28 September 2020	
11	MF	(Germany) Adrian Fein	(Germany) Bayern Munich	Loan	6 October 2020	
14	MF	(Netherlands) Marco van Ginkel	(England) Chelsea	Loan	6 October 2020	
27	MF	(Germany) Mario Götze	(Germany) Borussia Dortmund	Free	6 October 2020	

=== Out ===
No.	Pos	Player	Transferred to	Fee	Date	Source
11	FW	(Greece) Kostas Mitroglou	(France) Marseille	Loan return	1 July 2020	
1	GK	(Netherlands) Jeroen Zoet	(Italy) Spezia	€ 1,500,000	8 September 2020	
14	FW	(Netherlands) Sam Lammers	(Italy) Atalanta	€ 9,000,000	23 September 2020	
8	MF	(Netherlands) Jorrit Hendrix	(Russia) Spartak	€ 700,000	16 January 2021	

== Pre-season and friendlies ==
Win Draw Loss Fixtures

31 July 2020 Friendly	PSV (Netherlands)	Cancelled	(Netherlands) UNA	Eindhoven, Netherlands
19:00 CEST (UTC+2)				Stadium: Philips Stadion

8 August 2020 Friendly	SC Verl (Germany)	0–3	(Netherlands) PSV	Verl, Germany
16:00 CEST (UTC+2)		Report	Madueke 21', 25', 43'	Stadium: Sportclub Arena

9 August 2020 Friendly	KFC Uerdingen (Germany)	0–3	(Netherlands) PSV	Harsewinkel, Germany
16:00 CEST (UTC+2)		Report	Gakpo 10'; Lammers 75', 88'	Stadium: Sportanlage Klosterpforte

15 August 2020 Friendly	PSV (Netherlands)	1–1	(Netherlands) Vitesse	Eindhoven, Netherlands
18:45 CEST (UTC+2)	Dumfries (yellow card) 35'; Gakpo 52'	Report	Doekhi 6'; Bero (yellow card) 56'; Oukili (yellow card) 86'	Stadium: Philips Stadion

21 August 2020 Friendly	Willem II (Netherlands)	1–1	(Netherlands) PSV	Tilburg, Netherlands
18:45 CEST (UTC+2)	Llonch (yellow card) 30'; Pavlidis 76'	Report	Malen 16'; Rosario (yellow card) 40'	Stadium: Koning Willem II Stadion

22 August 2020 Friendly	PSV (Netherlands)	1–2	(Germany) Eintracht Frankfurt	Eindhoven, Netherlands
18:00 CEST (UTC+2)	Gakpo 63'	Report	Kamada 55'; Hinteregger 68'	Stadium: Philips Stadion

29 August 2020 Friendly	Hertha BSC (Germany)	Cancelled	(Netherlands) PSV	Berlin, Germany
15:00 CEST (UTC+2)				Stadium: Hanns-Braun-Stadion

29 August 2020 Friendly	Hertha BSC (Germany)	0–4	(Netherlands) PSV	Berlin, Germany
17:00 CEST (UTC+2)		Report	Malen 37'; Stark 47' (o.g.); Gakpo 70'; Lammers 76'	Stadium: Hanns-Braun-Stadion; Attendance: 0 Referee: Florian Lechner

3 September 2020 Friendly	PSV (Netherlands)	1–1	(Germany) Viktoria Köln	Eindhoven, Netherlands
15:00 CEST (UTC+2)	Viergever 43'	Report	Rossmann (yellow card) 32'; Risse 47'; Lanius (yellow card) 79'	Stadium: De Herdgang

== Competitions ==
=== Overview ===
Competition	First match	Last match	Starting round	Final position	Record							
Competition	First match	Last match	Starting round	Final position	Pld	W	D	L	GF	GA	GD	Win %
Eredivisie	13 September 2020	16 May 2021	Matchday 1	2nd	34	21	9	4	74	35	+39	61.76
KNVB Cup	16 December 2020	10 February 2021	Second round	Quarter-finals	3	2	0	1	5	3	+2	66.67
Europa League	24 September 2020	25 February 2021	Third qualifying round	Round of 32	10	7	0	3	23	15	+8	70.00
Total					47	30	9	8	102	53	+49	63.83

Last updated: 16 May 2021
Source: Soccerway

=== Eredivisie ===
==== League table ====
Pos	Team	Pld	W	D	L	GF	GA	GD	Pts	Qualification or relegation
1	Ajax (C)	34	28	4	2	102	23	+79	88	Qualification for the Champions League group stage
2	PSV Eindhoven	34	21	9	4	74	35	+39	72	Qualification for the Champions League second qualifying round
3	AZ	34	21	8	5	75	41	+34	71	Qualification for the Europa League play-off round
4	Vitesse	34	18	7	9	52	38	+14	61	Qualification for the Europa Conference League third qualifying round
5	Feyenoord (O)	34	16	11	7	64	36	+28	59	Qualification for the European competition play-offs (Note: Winner of play-off will qualify to Europa Conference League second qualifying round.)

Source: Eredivisie, Soccerway
Rules for classification: Season in progress: 1) Most points won; 2) Less points lost; 3) Goal difference; 4) Goals scored; 5) Alphabetical order; End of season: 1) Points; 2) Goal difference; 3) Goals scored; 4) Head-to-head points; 5) Head-to-head goal difference; 6) Head-to-head away goals scored; 7) Play-off if relevant for deciding champion, relegation or participating in a European league, otherwise by draw. 8) Penalty shoot-out (only after a play-off)
(C) Champions; (O) Play-off winners

==== Results summary ====
Overall								Home						Away					
Pld	W	D	L	GF	GA	GD	Pts	W	D	L	GF	GA	GD	W	D	L	GF	GA	GD
34	21	9	4	74	35	+39	72	13	3	1	39	13	+26	8	6	3	35	22	+13

Last updated: 16 May 2021.
Source: Eredivisie

==== Results by round ====
Round	1	2	3	4	5	6	7	8	9	10	11	12	13	14	15	16	17	18	19	20	21	22	23	24	25	26	27	28	29	30	31	32	33	34
Ground	A	H	A	H	A	A	H	H	A	H	A	H	A	H	A	H	A	H	A	A	H	A	H	H	A	H	A	H	A	H	H	A	H	A
Result	W	W	D	W	W	L	W	W	D	W	D	W	W	W	D	L	W	W	W	L	W	D	W	D	W	D	L	W	W	W	D	W	W	D
Position	2	3	5	2	1	2	3	3	4	3	3	2	2	2	2	4	3	3	2	2	2	2	2	2	2	2	2	2	2	2	2	2	2	2

Updated to match(es) played on 16 May 2021. Source: Eredivisie
A = Away; H = Home; W = Win; D = Draw; L = Loss

==== Matches ====
The league fixtures were announced on 24 July 2020.

13 September 2020 1	FC Groningen	1–3	PSV	Groningen
16:45 CEST (UTC+2)	Dammers (yellow card) 1'; Dankerlui (yellow card) 35'; Lundqvist (yellow card) 39'; Suslov 53'; Padt (yellow card) 79'	Report	Gakpo 34', 87'; Malen 57'; Max (yellow card) 60'; Teze (yellow card) 65'	Stadium: Hitachi Capital Mobility Stadion; Attendance: 6,049; Referee: Serdar Gözübüyük

19 September 2020 2	PSV	2–1	FC Emmen	Eindhoven
20:00 CEST (UTC+2)	Madueke 21'; Romero 90+4'	Report	Cavlan (yellow card) 42'; Mvogo 83' (o.g.); Laursen (yellow card) 84'; Jansen (yellow card) 87'	Stadium: Philips Stadion; Attendance: 8,000; Referee: Martin van den Kerkhof

27 September 2020 3	Heracles Almelo	1–1	PSV	Almelo
14:30 CEST (UTC+2)	Hardeveld (yellow card) 28'; Vloet 31' (pen.); Bijleveld (yellow card) 42'; Kiomourtzoglou (yellow card) 76'; Pröpper (yellow card) 88'	Report	Max 51' (pen.); Rosario (yellow card) 73'; Bruma (yellow card) 78'	Stadium: Erve Asito; Attendance: 3,083; Referee: Jochem Kamphuis

4 October 2020 4	PSV	2–0	Fortuna Sittard	Eindhoven
16:45 CEST (UTC+2)	Malen 5'; Madueke 85'	Report	Seuntjens (yellow card) 42'	Stadium: Philips Stadion; Attendance: 0 Referee: Jeroen Manschot

18 October 2020 5	PEC Zwolle	0–3	PSV	Zwolle
16:45 CEST (UTC+2)	Huiberts (yellow card) 43'; van Polen (yellow card) 57'	Report	Götze 9'; Gakpo 18'; Malen 39'; Rosario (yellow card) 61'; Sangaré (yellow card) 86'	Stadium: MAC³PARK Stadion; Attendance: 0 Referee: Danny Makkelie

25 October 2020 6	Vitesse	2–1	PSV	Arnhem
14:30 CET (UTC+1)	Rasmussen 9'; Openda 54'; Tronstad (yellow card) 64'; Buitink (yellow card) 80'; Dasa (yellow card) 84'	Report	Boscagli 50'	Stadium: GelreDome; Attendance: 0 Referee: Bas Nijhuis

1 November 2020 7	PSV	4–0	ADO Den Haag	Eindhoven
16:45 CET (UTC+1)	Zahavi 16' (pen.); Teze (yellow card) 37'; Madueke 51', 90+2'; Thomas 84'	Report	Karelis (yellow card) 80'	Stadium: Philips Stadion; Attendance: 0 Referee: Jochem Kamphuis

8 November 2020 8	PSV	3–0	Willem II	Eindhoven
20:00 CET (UTC+1)	Max 14'; Götze 21'; Rosario (yellow card) 40'; Malen 82'	Report	Köhn (red card) 63'	Stadium: Philips Stadion; Attendance: 0 Referee: Allard Lindhout

22 November 2020 9	FC Twente	1–1	PSV	Enschede
16:45 CET (UTC+1)	Danilo 63' (pen.); Pleguezuelo (yellow card) 68'	Report	Malen 8'; Zahavi (penalty missed) 44'; Madueke (yellow card) 57'; Gakpo (yellow card) 62'	Stadium: De Grolsch Veste; Attendance: 0 Referee: Pol van Boekel

29 November 2020 10	PSV	1–0	Sparta Rotterdam	Eindhoven
20:00 CET (UTC+1)	Ledezma (yellow card) 30'; Malen 78'	Report	Mijnans (yellow card) 66'; Engels (yellow card) 81'; Meijers (yellow card) 83'	Stadium: Philips Stadion; Attendance: 0 Referee: Jeroen Manschot

6 December 2020 11	SC Heerenveen	2–2	PSV	Heerenveen
16:45 CET (UTC+1)	H. Veerman 69'; Van Bergen 78'	Report	Rosario (yellow card) 13'; Götze 28'; Piroe 90+2'; Dumfries (yellow card) 90+3'	Stadium: Abe Lenstra Stadion; Attendance: 0 Referee: Bas Nijhuis

13 December 2020 12	PSV	2–1	FC Utrecht	Eindhoven
16:45 CET (UTC+1)	Malen 30'; Ihattaren 37'; Dumfries (yellow card) 76'	Report	Hoogma (yellow card) 54'; Mahi 71'	Stadium: Philips Stadion; Attendance: 0 Referee: Serdar Gözübüyük

19 December 2020 13	RKC Waalwijk	1–4	PSV	Waalwijk
20:00 CET (UTC+1)	Ngonge (yellow card) 63'; Stokkers 86'	Report	Gakpo 11'; Ihattaren 14'; Max (yellow card) 59'; Dumfries 71' (pen.); Rosario (yellow card) 78'; Madueke 90+5'	Stadium: Mandemakers Stadion; Attendance: 0 Referee: Kevin Blom

22 December 2020 14	PSV	4–1	VVV-Venlo	Eindhoven
20:00 CET (UTC+1)	Max 35' (pen.); Boscagli 49'; Gakpo 58'; Fein 90+2'	Report	Arias 22'	Stadium: Philips Stadion; Attendance: 0 Referee: Sander van der Eijk

10 January 2021 15	Ajax	2–2	PSV	Amsterdam
16:45 CET (UTC+1)	Promes 40'; Klaassen (yellow card) 53'; Antony 65'	Report	Zahavi 2', 21', (yellow card) 81'	Stadium: Johan Cruyff Arena; Attendance: 0 Referee: Björn Kuipers

13 January 2021 16	PSV	1–3	AZ	Eindhoven
18:45 CET (UTC+1)	Rosario (yellow card) 26'; Dumfries (yellow card) 56'; Max 59'; Sangaré (yellow card) 69'	Report	Koopmeiners 31' (pen.), 39'; Chatzidiakos (yellow card) 58'; Martins Indi (yellow card) 68'; Wijndal (yellow card) 77'; Stengs 90'	Stadium: Philips Stadion; Attendance: 0 Referee: Serdar Gözübüyük

16 January 2021 17	Sparta Rotterdam	3–5	PSV	Rotterdam
18:45 CET (UTC+1)	Smeets 4'; Beugelsdijk (yellow card) 45+2'; Gravenberch 75'; Kharchouch 87' (pen.)	Report	Mauro Júnior 24'; Malen 47', 90+3'; Madueke 49'; Max 71'	Stadium: Het Kasteel; Attendance: 0 Referee: Bas Nijhuis

23 January 2021 18	PSV	2–0	RKC Waalwijk	Eindhoven
20:00 CET (UTC+1)	Zahavi 45+1'; Gutiérrez (yellow card) 70'; Rosario 73'	Report	Meulensteen (yellow card) 45'	Stadium: Philips Stadion; Attendance: 0 Referee: Danny Makkelie

26 January 2021 19	FC Emmen	0–2	PSV	Emmen
20:00 CET (UTC+1)		Report	Mauro Júnior 81'; Zahavi 88'	Stadium: De Oude Meerdijk; Attendance: 0 Referee: Jeroen Manschot

31 January 2021 20	Feyenoord	3–1	PSV	Rotterdam
14:30 CET (UTC+1)	Diemers 7'; Berghuis 25'; Linssen 41'; Malacia (yellow card) 85'	Report	Sangaré 56', (yellow card) 61'; Mauro Júnior (yellow card) 82'	Stadium: De Kuip; Attendance: 0 Referee: Dennis Higler

6 February 2021 21	PSV	3–0	FC Twente	Eindhoven
16:30 CET (UTC+1)	Malen 30', 53'; Zahavi 36'	Report	Ilić (red card) 75'	Stadium: Philips Stadion; Attendance: 0 Referee: Siemen Mulder

13 February 2021 22	ADO Den Haag	2–2	PSV	The Hague
18:45 CET (UTC+1)	Adekanye 27'; Kramer 90+3'	Report	Max (penalty missed) 21'; Malen 51', 76'; Sangaré (yellow card) 67'	Stadium: Cars Jeans Stadion; Attendance: 0 Referee: Pol van Boekel

21 February 2021 23	PSV	3–1	Vitesse	Eindhoven
16:45 CET (UTC+1)	Gutiérrez (yellow card) 38'; Malen 66'; Sangaré (yellow card) 74'; Götze 86', 88'	Report	Broja 4'	Stadium: Philips Stadion; Attendance: 0 Referee: Björn Kuipers

28 February 2021 24	PSV	1–1	Ajax	Eindhoven
14:30 CET (UTC+1)	Zahavi 39', (yellow card) 87'; Boscagli (yellow card) 54'; Malen (yellow card) 89'; Dumfries (yellow card) 90+1'; Teze (yellow card) 90+4'	Report	Álvarez (yellow card) 38'; Tadić 90+2' (pen.)	Stadium: Philips Stadion; Attendance: 0 Referee: Danny Makkelie

7 March 2021 25	Fortuna Sittard	1–3	PSV	Sittard
14:30 CET (UTC+1)	Cox 69'	Report	Zahavi 10', 27'; Viergever (yellow card) 35'; Sangaré (yellow card) 43'; Madueke 87'	Stadium: Fortuna Sittard Stadion; Attendance: 0 Referee: Allard Lindhout

14 March 2021 26	PSV	1–1	Feyenoord	Eindhoven
14:30 CET (UTC+1)	Viergever (yellow card) 25'; Malen 38'	Report	Berghuis 15'; Sinisterra (yellow card) 19'; Malacia (yellow card) 81'; Senesi (yellow card) 90+1'	Stadium: Philips Stadion; Attendance: 0 Referee: Bas Nijhuis

21 March 2021 27	AZ	2–0	PSV	Alkmaar
14:30 CET (UTC+1)	Karlsson 4'; Koopmeiners 68'	Report	Sangaré (yellow card) 73'	Stadium: AFAS Stadion; Attendance: 0 Referee: Dennis Higler

4 April 2021 28	PSV	3–0	Heracles Almelo	Eindhoven
14:30 CEST (UTC+2)	Malen 9'; Dumfries 21'; Zahavi (yellow card) 59'; Ihattaren 90+2'	Report	Quagliata (yellow card) 71'; Pröpper (yellow card) 79'	Stadium: Philips Stadion; Attendance: 0 Referee: Martin van den Kerkhof

11 April 2021 29	VVV-Venlo	0–2	PSV	Venlo
14:30 CEST (UTC+2)	Giakoumakis (yellow card) 65'	Report	Gakpo 13'; Malen 59'	Stadium: De Koel; Attendance: 0 Referee: Kevin Blom

24 April 2021 30	PSV	1–0	FC Groningen	Eindhoven
20:00 CEST (UTC+2)	Zahavi 64' (pen.); Dumfries (yellow card) 72'	Report	Te Wierik (yellow card) 59'; Dammers (yellow card) 62'; Da Cruz (yellow card) 76'	Stadium: Philips Stadion; Attendance: 0 Referee: Jeroen Manschot

2 May 2021 31	PSV	2–2	SC Heerenveen	Eindhoven
16:45 CEST (UTC+2)	Viergever (yellow card) 38'; Vertessen 57'; Gakpo 58', (yellow card) 87'	Report	Kongolo (yellow card) 22'; Halilović 34'; De Jong 59'; Smit (yellow card) 90+4'; Floranus (yellow card) 90+6'	Stadium: Philips Stadion; Attendance: 0 Referee: Allard Lindhout

9 May 2021 32	Willem II	0–2	PSV	Tilburg
16:45 CEST (UTC+2)		Report	Malen 26'; Köhn 51' (o.g.); Dumfries (yellow card) 82'	Stadium: Koning Willem II Stadion; Attendance: 0 Referee: Dennis Higler

13 May 2021 33	PSV	4–2	PEC Zwolle	Eindhoven
14:30 CEST (UTC+2)	Mous 22' (o.g.); Malen 29'; Vertessen 34'; Zahavi 54'	Report	Bajselmani (yellow card) 42'; Doue (yellow card) 52'; Lam (yellow card) 66'; Pherai 69'; Lagsir 90'	Stadium: Philips Stadion; Attendance: 0 Referee: Serdar Gözübüyük

16 May 2021 34	FC Utrecht	1–1	PSV	Utrecht
14:30 CEST (UTC+2)	Van de Streek 36'	Report	Van Ginkel 49'	Stadium: Stadion Galgenwaard; Attendance: 0 Referee: Björn Kuipers

=== KNVB Cup ===
16 December 2020 Second round	De Graafschap	1–2	PSV	Doetinchem
18:45 CET (UTC+1)	Van Heertum (yellow card) 45'; Hilderink 90'; Van Huizen (yellow card) 90+1'	Report	Sangaré (yellow card) 22'; Max 56' (pen.); Malen 84'	Stadium: De Vijverberg; Attendance: 0 Referee: Jochem Kamphuis

19 January 2021 Round of 16	FC Volendam	0–2	PSV	Volendam
21:00 CET (UTC+1)	Van de Ven (yellow card) 47'	Report	Madueke 51'; Dumfries 79' (pen.)	Stadium: Kras Stadion; Attendance: 0 Referee: Christiaan Bax

10 February 2021 Quarter-finals	Ajax	2–1	PSV	Amsterdam
20:00 CET (UTC+1)	Haller 19', 24'; Tagliafico (yellow card) 64'; Rensch (yellow card) 64'; Álvarez (yellow card) 89'	Report	Teze (yellow card) 26'; Timber 58' (o.g.); Zahavi (yellow card) 82'; Malen (yellow card) 89'	Stadium: Johan Cruyff Arena; Attendance: 0 Referee: Serdar Gözübüyük
Note: The game has been moved an hour earlier due to severe winter conditions.

=== UEFA Europa League ===
==== Qualifying rounds and play-off round ====
24 September 2020 Third qualifying round	Mura (Slovenia)	1–5	(Netherlands) PSV	Murska Sobota, Slovenia
19:00 CEST (UTC+2)	Kouter 21'; Filipović (yellow card) 30'; Kous (yellow card) 70'	Report	Malen 17', 65'; Mauro Júnior 28'; Thomas (yellow card) 49'; Gakpo 54', 90'; Dumfries (yellow card) 62'	Stadium: Fazanerija City Stadium; Attendance: 0 Referee: Sandro Schärer (Switzerland)

1 October 2020 Play-off round	Rosenborg (Norway)	0–2	(Netherlands) PSV	Trondheim, Norway
19:00 CEST (UTC+2)	Adegbenro (yellow card) 63'; Konate (yellow card) 90'	Report	Rosario (yellow card) 16'; Zahavi 22'; Hendrix (yellow card) 58'; Gakpo 61'; Dumfries (yellow card) 87'	Stadium: Lerkendal Stadion; Attendance: 0 Referee: Davide Massa (Italy)

==== Group stage ====
The group stage draw was held on 2 October 2020.

Pos	Team	Pld	W	D	L	GF	GA	GD	Pts	Qualification	PSV	GRA	PAOK	OMO
1	(Netherlands) PSV Eindhoven	6	4	0	2	12	9	+3	12	Advance to knockout phase	—	1–2	3–2	4–0
2	(Spain) Granada	6	3	2	1	6	3	+3	11	Advance to knockout phase	0–1	—	0–0	2–1
3	(Greece) PAOK	6	1	3	2	8	7	+1	6		4–1	0–0	—	1–1
4	(Cyprus) Omonia	6	1	1	4	5	12	−7	4		1–2	0–2	2–1	—

Source: UEFA
Rules for classification: Group stage tiebreakers

22 October 2020 1	PSV (Netherlands)	1–2	(Spain) Granada	Eindhoven, Netherlands
18:55 CEST (UTC+2)	Götze 45+1'; Mauro Júnior (yellow card) 45+3'	Report	Molina (yellow card) 45+1', (goal) 57'; Milla (yellow card) 45+2'; Montoro (yellow card) 49'; Machís 66'; Silva (yellow card) 90+2'; Suárez (yellow card) 90+5'	Stadium: Philips Stadion; Attendance: 0 Referee: Felix Zwayer (Germany)

29 October 2020 2	Omonia (Cyprus)	1–2	(Netherlands) PSV	Nicosia, Cyprus
21:00 CET (UTC+1)	Gómez 29', (yellow card) 78'; Asante (yellow card) 86'	Report	Malen 40', 90+2'; Thomas (yellow card) 47'; Teze (yellow card) 69'; Fein (yellow card) 85'	Stadium: GSP Stadium; Attendance: 0 Referee: Donatas Rumšas (Lithuania)

5 November 2020 3	PAOK (Greece)	4–1	(Netherlands) PSV	Thessaloniki, Greece
18:55 CET (UTC+1)	Douglas (yellow card) 18'; Schwab 47'; Živković 56', 66'; Tzolis 58'	Report	Zahavi 21' (pen.); Sangaré (yellow card) 77'	Stadium: Toumba Stadium; Attendance: 0 Referee: Daniel Stefański (Poland)

26 November 2020 4	PSV (Netherlands)	3–2	(Greece) PAOK	Eindhoven, Netherlands
21:00 CET (UTC+1)	Gakpo 20'; Madueke 51'; Malen 53'; Dumfries (yellow card) 90+5'	Report	Varela 4', (yellow card) 90+6'; Tsiggaras (yellow card) 8'; Tzolis 13'; El Kaddouri (yellow card) 64'; Douglas (yellow card) 71'; Biseswar (yellow card) 90+4'	Stadium: Philips Stadion; Attendance: 0 Referee: Andris Treimanis (Latvia)

3 December 2020 5	Granada (Spain)	0–1	(Netherlands) PSV	Granada, Spain
21:00 CET (UTC+1)	Duarte (yellow card) 18'; Germán (yellow card) 27'; Machís (yellow card) 77'	Report	Malen 38'; Sangaré (yellow card) 40'; Götze (yellow card) 61'	Stadium: Nuevo Los Cármenes; Attendance: 0 Referee: Roi Reinshreiber (Israel)

10 December 2020 6	PSV (Netherlands)	4–0	(Cyprus) Omonia	Eindhoven, Netherlands
18:55 CET (UTC+1)	Dumfries (yellow card) 30', (goal) 63' (pen.); Malen 36'; Hendrix (yellow card) 78'; Piroe 90+1', 90+3'	Report	Gómez (penalty missed) 70'; Lang (yellow card) 73'; Ďuriš (yellow card) 83'	Stadium: Philips Stadion; Attendance: 0 Referee: Kevin Clancy (Scotland)

==== Knockout phase ====
===== Round of 32 =====
The draw for the round of 32 was held on 14 December 2020.

18 February 2021 First leg	Olympiacos (Greece)	4–2	(Netherlands) PSV	Piraeus, Greece
18:55 CET (UTC+1)	Bouchalakis 9'; M'Vila 37'; El-Arabi 45+2'; Reabciuk (yellow card) 57'; Ba (yellow card) 63'; Bruma (yellow card) 63'; Masouras 83'	Report	Zahavi 14', 40'; Sangaré (yellow card) 32'; Rosario (yellow card) 63'	Stadium: Karaiskakis Stadium; Attendance: 0 Referee: Andreas Ekberg (Sweden)

25 February 2021 Second leg	PSV (Netherlands)	2–1 (4–5 agg.)	(Greece) Olympiacos	Eindhoven, Netherlands
21:00 CET (UTC+1)	Max (yellow card) 3'; Zahavi 23', 44'; Malen (yellow card) 84'	Report	Masouras (yellow card) 51'; Lala (yellow card) 79'; Hassan 88'; Tzolakis (yellow card) 88'; Dräger (yellow card) 88'	Stadium: Philips Stadion; Attendance: 0 Referee: Clément Turpin (France)

== Statistics ==
=== Appearances and goals ===
As of 16 May 2021

No.	Pos	Nat	Player	Total		Eredivisie		KNVB Cup		Europa League	
No.	Pos	Nat	Player	Apps	Goals	Apps	Goals	Apps	Goals	Apps	Goals
Goalkeepers
13	GK	(Germany) GER	Lars Unnerstall	4	0	1	0	3	0	0	0
16	GK	(Germany) GER	Vincent Müller	0	0	0	0	0	0	0	0
21	GK	(Belgium) BEL	Maxime Delanghe	0	0	0	0	0	0	0	0
38	GK	(Switzerland) SUI	Yvon Mvogo	43	0	33	0	0	0	10	0
Defenders
4	DF	(Netherlands) NED	Nick Viergever	22	0	13+4	0	1	0	2+2	0
5	DF	(Germany) GER	Timo Baumgartl	14	0	6+2	0	2	0	2+2	0
22	DF	(Netherlands) NED	Denzel Dumfries	41	4	27+3	2	3	1	8	1
24	DF	(Netherlands) NED	Armando Obispo	5	0	1+4	0	0	0	0	0
28	DF	(France) FRA	Olivier Boscagli	42	2	29+1	2	1+1	0	9+1	0
31	DF	(Germany) GER	Philipp Max	44	6	29+2	5	3	1	10	0
33	DF	(Netherlands) NED	Jordan Teze	45	0	31+2	0	2+1	0	8+1	0
35	DF	(Norway) NOR	Fredrik Oppegård	1	0	0+1	0	0	0	0	0
39	DF	(Brazil) BRA	Luis Felipe	1	0	0+1	0	0	0	0	0
44	DF	(Netherlands) NED	Shurandy Sambo	1	0	0+1	0	0	0	0	0
Midfielders
6	MF	(Ivory Coast) CIV	Ibrahim Sangaré	39	1	25+4	1	3	0	6+1	0
10	MF	(Netherlands) NED	Mohamed Ihattaren	29	3	13+9	3	3	0	4	0
11	MF	(Germany) GER	Adrian Fein	18	1	4+9	1	0+2	0	0+3	0
14	MF	(Netherlands) NED	Marco van Ginkel	12	1	3+8	1	0	0	0+1	0
15	MF	(Mexico) MEX	Érick Gutiérrez	10	0	1+7	0	0+1	0	0+1	0
17	MF	(Brazil) BRA	Mauro Júnior	28	3	12+7	2	2	0	3+4	1
18	MF	(Netherlands) NED	Pablo Rosario	40	1	26+3	1	2+1	0	8	0
27	MF	(Germany) GER	Mario Götze	25	6	17+1	5	1	0	6	1
30	MF	(New Zealand) NZL	Ryan Thomas	24	1	11+5	1	0+2	0	6	0
37	MF	(United States) USA	Richard Ledezma	6	0	1+2	0	0	0	1+2	0
49	MF	(Norway) NOR	Mathias Kjølø	1	0	0+1	0	0	0	0	0
55	MF	(Morocco) MAR	Ismael Saibari	2	0	0+1	0	0	0	0+1	0
Forwards
7	FW	(Israel) ISR	Eran Zahavi	33	17	24+1	11	1+1	0	5+1	6
9	FW	(Netherlands) NED	Donyell Malen	45	27	26+6	19	3	1	10	7
19	FW	(Netherlands) NED	Cody Gakpo	29	11	22+1	7	1	0	3+2	4
20	FW	(Argentina) ARG	Maximiliano Romero	2	1	0+1	1	0	0	0+1	0
23	FW	(England) ENG	Noni Madueke	32	9	7+17	7	1	1	3+4	1
29	FW	(Netherlands) NED	Joel Piroe	14	3	0+11	1	0+2	0	1	2
53	FW	(Belgium) BEL	Yorbe Vertessen	18	2	6+9	2	0+1	0	0+2	0
57	FW	(Curaçao) CUW	Jeremy Antonisse	1	0	0+1	0	0	0	0	0
Players transferred out during the season
8	MF	(Netherlands) NED	Jorrit Hendrix	16	0	3+6	0	1	0	3+3	0
14	MF	(Netherlands) NED	Sam Lammers	1	0	1	0	0	0	0	0
32	MF	(Czech Republic) CZE	Michal Sadílek	3	0	1+1	0	0	0	0+1	0
7	FW	(Portugal) POR	Bruma	4	0	1+2	0	0	0	1	0

=== Goalscorers ===
As of 25 February 2021

Rank	No.	Pos	Nat	Name	Eredivisie	KNVB Cup	Europa League	Total
1	9	FW	(Netherlands)	Donyell Malen	14	1	7	22
2	11	FW	(Israel)	Eran Zahavi	6	0	6	12
3	19	FW	(Netherlands)	Cody Gakpo	5	0	4	9
4	23	FW	(England)	Noni Madueke	6	1	1	8
5	31	DF	(Germany)	Philipp Max	5	1	0	6
5	27	MF	(Germany)	Mario Götze	5	0	1	6
7	17	MF	(Brazil)	Mauro Júnior	2	0	1	3
7	22	DF	(Netherlands)	Denzel Dumfries	1	1	1	3
7	29	FW	(Netherlands)	Joël Piroe	1	0	2	3
10	10	MF	(Netherlands)	Mohamed Ihattaren	2	0	0	2
10	28	DF	(France)	Olivier Boscagli	2	0	0	2
12	6	MF	(Ivory Coast)	Ibrahim Sangaré	1	0	0	1
12	11	MF	(Germany)	Adrian Fein	1	0	0	1
12	18	MF	(Netherlands)	Pablo Rosario	1	0	0	1
12	20	FW	(Argentina)	Maximiliano Romero	1	0	0	1
12	30	MF	(New Zealand)	Ryan Thomas	1	0	0	1
Own goals					0	1	0	1
Totals					54	5	23	83
