= Adam Maher =

Dutch footballer (born 1993)

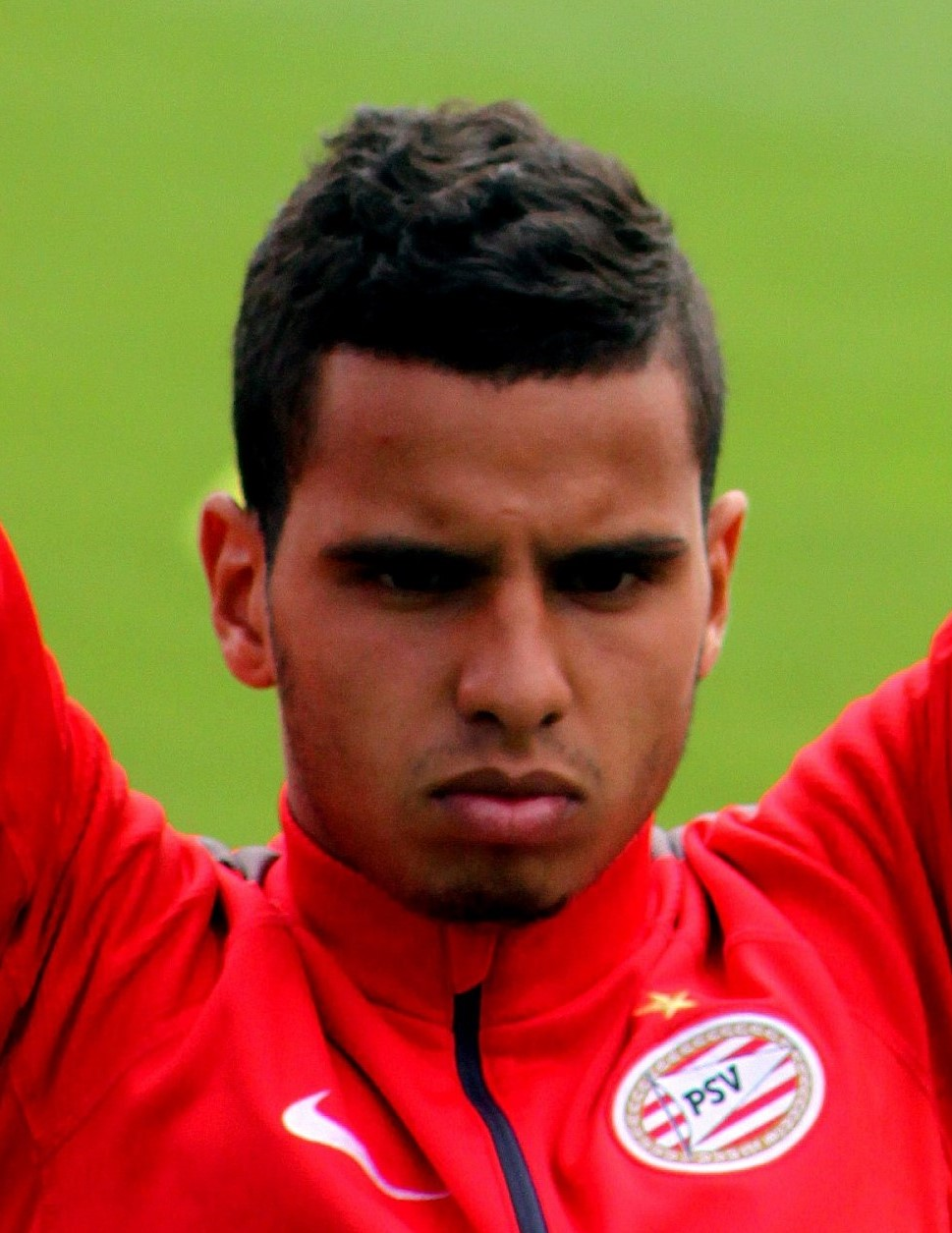
- Maher with PSV in 2014

Personal information
- Full name: Adam Maher
- Date of birth: 20 July 1993 (age 33)
- Place of birth: Ait Izzou, Zagora Province, Morocco
- Height: 1.70 m (5 ft 7 in)
- Position: Midfielder

Youth career
- 1998–2001: SV Diemen
- 2001–2004: AVV Zeeburgia
- 2004–2010: AZ

Senior career*
Years	Team	Apps	(Gls)
2010–2013	AZ	66	(12)
2013–2018	PSV	72	(12)
2016–2017	→ Osmanlıspor (loan)	24	(2)
2018	FC Twente	16	(1)
2018–2019	AZ	25	(1)
2019–2022	FC Utrecht	82	(6)
2022–2025	Damac	33	(0)
2024	→ Al-Wakrah (loan)	2	(0)

International career^{‡}
2007–2008	Netherlands U15	4	(0)
2008–2009	Netherlands U16	6	(0)
2009–2010	Netherlands U17	10	(3)
2010–2011	Netherlands U19	12	(1)
2011–2014	Netherlands U21	21	(2)
2012–2013	Netherlands	5	(0)
- * Club domestic league appearances and goals as of 12 August 2023 ‡ National team caps and goals as of 27 July 2022

Adam Maher (Arabic: آدم ماهر; born 20 July 1993) is a professional footballer who plays as a midfielder. Born in Morocco, he played for the Netherlands national team.

== Club career ==
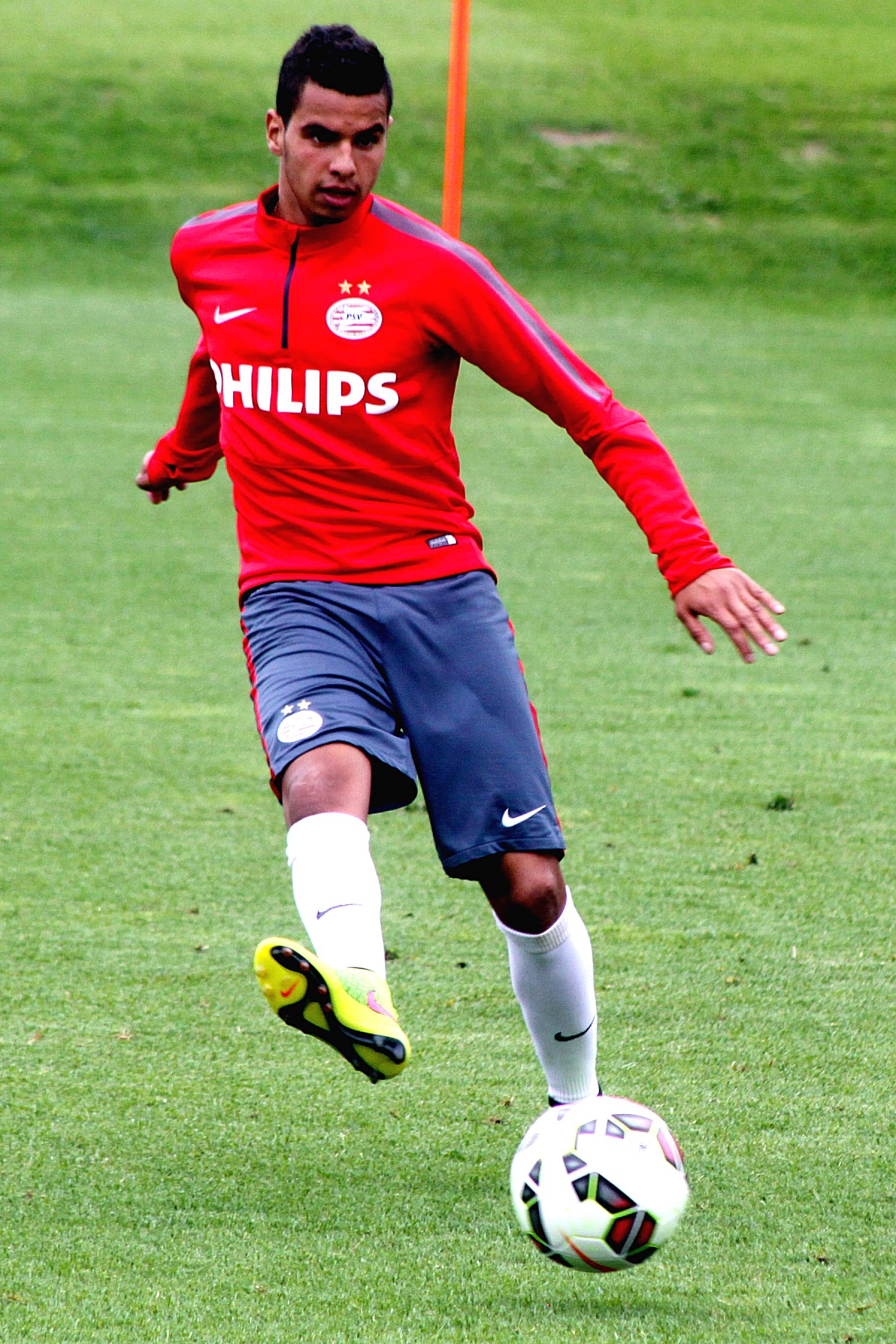
Maher training with PSV in 2014

Maher made his professional debut for AZ on 15 December 2010 in a 2010–11 UEFA Europa League game against FC BATE Borisov and scored a goal on his debut. He was the youngest player playing for a Dutch football club ever to score a goal in the Europa League and UEFA Cup. When AZ won the 2013 KNVB Cup Final Maher scored the first goal as they defeated PSV Eindhoven 2–1.

On 1 July 2013, Adam Maher moved to PSV for a fee of €6.5 million. He signed a five-year contract and was one of 5 players that PSV signed. Maher returned to AZ in the 2018–19 season, before joining FC Utrecht in the summer of 2019.

On 11 July 2022, FC Utrecht announced the departure of Maher to Damac FC on a permanent transfer. On 15 February 2024, Maher joined Qatar Stars League club Al-Wakrah on a six-month loan.

== International career ==
Born in Morocco, Maher moved to the Netherlands at a young age. He was a member of the Netherlands squad for the 2009 FIFA U-17 World Cup. In February 2012, Maher was called at the preselection of the Dutch team by Bert van Marwijk. On 7 May 2012, he was named in the provisional list of 36 players for the Euro 2012 tournament, one of nine uncapped players to be chosen by Netherlands manager Bert van Marwijk as part of the preliminary squad, but eventually did not make the final cut. He made his debut for the Netherlands in a friendly match against German club Bayern Munich. On 15 August 2012, Maher earned his first official cap under new manager Louis van Gaal in the 4–2 loss against Belgium in a friendly match. He later played in three competitive matches during the 2014 FIFA World Cup qualification.

== Career statistics ==
=== Club ===
As of match played 31 May 2023

Appearances and goals by club, season and competition
Club	Season	League			National cup (Note: Includes KNVB Cup, Turkish Cup, King Cup)		Continental		Other		Total	
Club	Season	Division	Apps	Goals	Apps	Goals	Apps	Goals	Apps	Goals	Apps	Goals
AZ	2010–11	Eredivisie	1	0	1	0	1 (Note: Appearance(s) in UEFA Europa League)	1	–		3	1
AZ	2011–12	Eredivisie	34	5	5	3	13	3	–		52	11
AZ	2012–13	Eredivisie	31	7	6	3	2	0	–		39	10
AZ	Total		66	12	12	6	16	4	–		94	22
PSV	2013–14	Eredivisie	26	3	1	0	10 (Note: Four appearances in UEFA Champions League, six appearances and one goal in UEFA Europa League)	1	–		37	4
PSV	2014–15	Eredivisie	31	7	3	0	12	1	–		46	8
PSV	2015–16	Eredivisie	14	2	2	0	3 (Note: Appearances in UEFA Champions League)	0	1 (Note: Appearance in Johan Cruyff Shield)	1	20	3
PSV	2017–18	Eredivisie	0	0	0	0	0	0	0	0	0	0
PSV	2017–18	Eredivisie	1	0	2	2	0	0	–		3	2
PSV	Total		72	12	8	2	25	2	1	1	105	18
Osmanlıspor (loan)	2016–17	Süper Lig	24	2	7	0	8	1	–		39	3
FC Twente	2017–18	Eredivisie	16	1	2	2	–		–		18	3
AZ	2018–19	Eredivisie	25	1	4	1	0	0	–		29	2
FC Utrecht	2019–20	Eredivisie	23	3	4	2	2	0	–		29	5
FC Utrecht	2020–21	Eredivisie	27	2	1	0	–		–		28	2
FC Utrecht	2021–22	Eredivisie	32	1	2	1	–		–		34	2
FC Utrecht	Total		82	6	7	3	2	0	–		91	9
Damac	2022–23	Saudi Pro League	29	0	1	0	–		–		30	0
Career total			291	34	41	14	51	7	1	1	406	57

=== International ===
As of 10 September 2013

Appearances and goals by national team and year
National team	Year	Apps	Goals
Netherlands	2012	2	0
Netherlands	2013	3	0
Total		5	0

== Honours ==
AZ

- KNVB Cup: 2012–13

PSV

- Eredivisie: 2014–15, 2015–16
- Johan Cruyff Shield: 2015, 2016

Individual

- Johan Cruijff Trophy: 2011–12
- Eredivisie Player of the Month: October 2019
