= Roy Beerens =

Dutch footballer (born 1987)

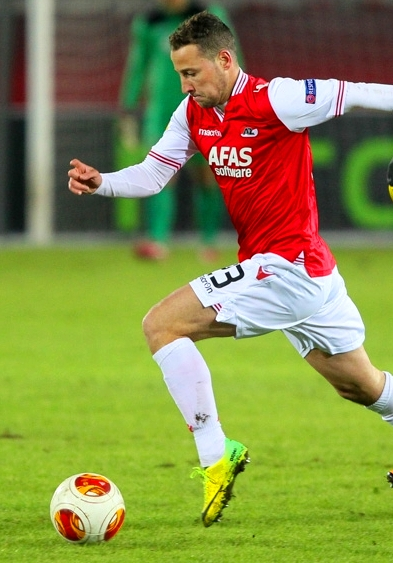
- Beerens with AZ in 2014

Personal information
- Full name: Roy Johannes Henricus Beerens
- Date of birth: 22 December 1987 (age 38)
- Place of birth: Bladel, Netherlands
- Height: 1.73 m (5 ft 8 in)
- Position: Winger

Youth career
- Bladella
- 1998–2005: PSV

Senior career*
Years	Team	Apps	(Gls)
2005–2007	PSV	9	(1)
2007	→ NEC (loan)	14	(2)
2007–2011	Heerenveen	114	(25)
2011–2014	AZ	93	(13)
2014–2016	Hertha BSC	29	(4)
2016–2018	Reading	57	(8)
2018–2020	Vitesse	30	(2)
Total		346	(53)

International career
2007–2010	Netherlands U21	19	(3)
2008–2009	Netherlands B	3	(0)
2010–2011	Netherlands	2	(0)
Medal record
Men's football
Representing Netherlands
UEFA European Under-21 Championship
Winner	2007 Netherlands
- * Club domestic league appearances and goals

Roy Johannes Henricus Beerens (born 22 December 1987) is a Dutch former professional footballer who played as a right winger.

Known for his quick dribbling and fast sprints, Beerens emerged as a talent from the PSV youth academy, but made his breakthrough as part of the Heerenveen team between 2007 and 2011. After a four-year spell with AZ, he moved abroad and represented German club Hertha BSC and English club Reading, before returning to the Netherlands where he ended his career as part of Vitesse.

Beerens was part of the Netherlands U21 team winning the 2007 UEFA European Under-21 Football Championship at home. He made his senior debut for the Netherlands on 11 August 2010 in a friendly against Ukraine.

== Club career ==
=== PSV ===
Born in Bladel, Netherlands, Beerens progressed through the PSV youth academy. He promoted to the second team, Jong PSV, for the 2005–06 season and regularly practiced with the first team. He was also allowed to join training camp for the Peace Cup tournament in South Korea, as part of the pre-season. In the match against Colombian club Once Caldas, Beerens made his first ever senior start. On 25 March 2006, he made his official debut for PSV in a 3–0 win over Willem II, where he came in for Arouna Koné. Beerens' first official goal for PSV's first team came on 15 October 2006 in the home match against Roda JC.

==== NEC (loan) ====
On 30 December 2006, PSV and NEC agreed on a six-month loan. At NEC, he scored in the derby against Vitesse, among others. He also made his debut for the Netherlands U21 team during this period.

=== Heerenveen ===
At the end of the 2006–07 season, PSV wanted to extend Beerens' contract, which ran for one more year. In July 2007, however, Beerens decided to sign a three-year contract with Heerenveen. In May 2009, Beerens signed a contract extension with Heerenveen until the summer of 2013. At Heerenveen, he grew into a fan favourite, playing almost every match under head coach Gertjan Verbeek. Although he appeared in almost every game in his final seasons, his playing minutes became less and less, as he had lost his starting place to Luciano Narsingh. This caused Beerens to hand in a transfer request; something Heerenveen was willing to cooperate on, due to his proven for the club.

=== AZ ===
In August 2011, Beerens moved from Heerenveen to AZ Alkmaar on a four-year contract, reuniting him with former coach Gertjan Verbeek.

=== Hertha BSC ===
On 11 July 2014, it was announced by German club Hertha BSC that they had signed Roy Beerens on a 3-year deal. He scored his first goal in a 4–2 win against FC Viktoria Köln on 16 August 2014.

=== Reading ===
On 16 July 2016, Beerens signed a three-year contract with Reading for an undisclosed fee. There, he played under head coach Jaap Stam, a fellow Dutchman. He scored his first goal for Reading in a 2–0 EFL Cup win against Plymouth Argyle on 9 August 2016.

=== Vitesse ===
On 31 January 2018, Beerens returned to the Eredivisie, signing a three-and-a-half-year deal. After a strong start in 2018, under head coach Henk Fraser, a conflict with his successor, Russian coach Leonid Slutsky followed. Beerens was benched afterwards.

On 24 December 2020, he announced his retirement from football.

== International career ==
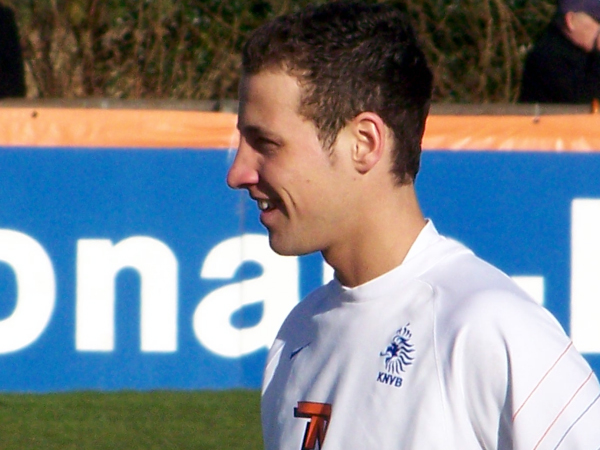
Beerens training with the Netherlands under-21 team in 2008

In 2007, Beerens was called up by Netherlands U21 coach Foppe de Haan to be part of his squad for the 2007 UEFA European Under-21 Football Championship held in the Netherlands. Beerens participated in their second first round group match against Portugal (2–1 win) to secure a semi final spot and to qualify for the 2008 Summer Olympics. In the semi-finals against England (1–1, 13–12 after 32 penalty kicks) Beerens came on as a substitute and scored both penalties he had to take in the series. The Dutch went on to retain their 2006 title by beating Serbia 4–1 in the final.

Beerens also played for the Netherlands at the 2008 Summer Olympics. He was first called up for the senior team for a friendly match against Ukraine in August 2010.

== Style of play ==
Beerens has been described as a versatile winger that can play on either the left or right flank. Furthermore, he was technically gifted. During his career, he was renowned for his quick pace, and his ability to score goals and create chances for others.

== Career statistics ==
=== Club ===
Appearances and goals by club, season and competition
Club	Season	League			National Cup		League Cup		Continental		Other		Total	
Club	Season	Division	Apps	Goals	Apps	Goals	Apps	Goals	Apps	Goals	Apps	Goals	Apps	Goals
PSV Eindhoven	2005–06	Eredivisie	2	0	0	0	–		0	0	0	0	2	0
PSV Eindhoven	2006–07	Eredivisie	7	1	1	0	–		2 (Note: Appearances in the Champions League)	0	0	0	10	1
PSV Eindhoven	Total		9	1	1	0	0	0	2	0	0	0	12	1
N.E.C. (loan)	2006–07	Eredivisie	14	2	0	0	–		–		4 (Note: Appearances in the Eredivisie playoffs)	0	18	2
Heerenveen	2007–08	Eredivisie	28	6	2	0	–		0	0	4	0	34	6
Heerenveen	2008–09	Eredivisie	29	9	6	2	–		5 (Note: Appearances in the Europa League)	0	–		40	11
Heerenveen	2009–10	Eredivisie	29	4	2	0	–		6	0	1 (Note: Appearance in the Johan Cruijff Shield)	0	38	4
Heerenveen	2010–11	Eredivisie	28	6	1	0	–		–		–		29	6
Heerenveen	Total		114	25	11	2	0	0	13	0	5	0	143	27
AZ Alkmaar	2011–12	Eredivisie	26	3	4	0	–		12	0	–		42	3
AZ Alkmaar	2012–13	Eredivisie	34	5	5	0	–		2	0	–		41	5
AZ Alkmaar	2013–14	Eredivisie	33	5	4	0	–		13	0	1	0	51	5
AZ Alkmaar	Total		93	13	13	0	0	0	27	0	1	0	134	13
Hertha BSC	2014–15	Bundesliga	27	4	2	1	–		–		–		29	5
Hertha BSC	2015–16	Bundesliga	2	0	1	0	–		–		–		3	0
Hertha BSC	Total		29	4	3	1	0	0	0	0	0	0	32	5
Reading	2016–17	Championship	40	6	1	0	2	1	–		–		43	7
Reading	2017–18	Championship	17	2	2	0	1	0	–		0	0	20	2
Reading	Total		57	8	3	0	3	1	0	0	0	0	63	9
Vitesse	2017–18	Eredivisie	12	1	0	0	–		0	0	4	0	16	1
Vitesse	2018–19	Eredivisie	16	1	2	0	–		4	1	–		22	2
Vitesse	2019–20	Eredivisie	2	0	0	0	–		–		–		2	0
Vitesse	Total		30	2	2	0	–		4	1	4	0	40	3
Career total			346	55	34	3	3	1	46	1	14	0	443	60

=== International ===
Netherlands
Year	Apps	Goals
2010	1	0
2011	1	0
Total	2	0

== Honours ==
PSV

- Eredivisie: 2005–06

Heerenveen

- KNVB Cup: 2008–09

AZ

- KNVB Cup: 2012–13
