= 2017–18 PSV Eindhoven season =

PSV
2017–18 season
- General manager: Toon Gerbrands
- Head coach: Phillip Cocu
- Stadium: Philips Stadion
- Eredivisie: 1st
- KNVB Cup: Quarter-finals
- Europa League: Third qualifying round
- Top goalscorer: League: Hirving Lozano (15); All: Hirving Lozano (17)
Home colours	Away colours	Third colours

During the 2017–18 season, PSV Eindhoven participated in the Dutch Eredivisie, the KNVB Cup and the UEFA Europa League. They won the Eredivisie by defeating Ajax 3-0 at the Philips Stadion.

== Season summary ==
Several starting players departed the club before the season, including Andrés Guardado, Héctor Moreno, Davy Pröpper and Jetro Willems. The biggest incoming transfer was Hirving Lozano, coming from Mexican club Pachuca. Despite these changes PSV won the Eredivisie title. The league was decided after a 3–0 victory over rivals Ajax.

In the KNVB cup, PSV reached the quarter-finals before being eliminated by Feyenoord. PSV's Europa League campaign was a failure as they were knocked out by Croatian side Osijek in the qualifying rounds: it was the first time in 43 years that PSV failed to qualify for the main tournament of a European competition.

== Squad ==
As of 19 January 2018

Note: Flags indicate national team as defined under FIFA eligibility rules; some limited exceptions apply. Players may hold more than one non-FIFA nationality.

No.	Pos.	Nation	Player
1	GK	NED	Jeroen Zoet
2	DF	GLP	Nicolas Isimat-Mirin
3	DF	NED	Derrick Luckassen
4	DF	COL	Santiago Arias
5	DF	GER	Daniel Schwaab
7	FW	URU	Gastón Pereiro
8	MF	NED	Jorrit Hendrix
9	FW	NED	Luuk de Jong
10	MF	NED	Marco van Ginkel (Captain, on loan from Chelsea)
11	FW	MEX	Hirving Lozano
13	GK	CUW	Eloy Room
14	FW	NED	Sam Lammers

No.	Pos.	Nation	Player
16	MF	BEL	Dante Rigo
17	FW	NED	Steven Bergwijn
18	MF	NED	Pablo Rosario
20	DF	NED	Joshua Brenet
21	GK	NED	Luuk Koopmans
22	FW	ARG	Maximiliano Romero
23	MF	NED	Bart Ramselaar
24	MF	SWE	Ramon Pascal Lundqvist
29	FW	ISL	Albert Guðmundsson
31	GK	NED	Yanick van Osch
32	MF	NED	Kenneth Paal
47	MF	BRA	Mauro Júnior

== Friendlies ==
8 July 2016 Friendly	PSV	2–0	RKC Waalwijk
16:00	Bergwijn 54', 78'	Report

12 July 2016 Friendly	Sion	0–1	PSV
19:00		Report	Pereiro 28'

16 July 2016 Friendly	Monaco	0–0	PSV
17:00		Report

18 July 2016 Friendly	Grasshoppers	3–1	PSV
19:00	Andersen 33', 64'; Munsy 85'	Report	Pereiro 46'

6 August 2016 Friendly	Augsburg	0–0	PSV	Augsburg
15:00		Report		Stadium: Augsburg Arena

== Competitions ==
=== Eredivisie ===
==== League table ====
Pos	Team	Pld	W	D	L	GF	GA	GD	Pts	Qualification or relegation
1	PSV Eindhoven (C)	34	26	5	3	87	39	+48	83	Qualification to Champions League play-off round
2	Ajax	34	25	4	5	89	33	+56	79	Qualification to Champions League second qualifying round
3	AZ	34	22	5	7	72	38	+34	71	Qualification to Europa League second qualifying round
4	Feyenoord	34	20	6	8	76	39	+37	66	Qualification to Europa League third qualifying round (Note: Feyenoord qualified for the Europa League third qualifying round by winning the 2017–18 KNVB Cup.)
5	Utrecht	34	14	12	8	58	53	+5	54	Qualification to European competition play-offs (Note: Four teams play for a spot in the 2018–19 UEFA Europa League second qualifying round.)

Source: eredivisie.nl
Rules for classification: 1) Points; 2) Goal difference; 3) Goals scored; 4) Head-to-head points; 5) Head-to-head goal difference; 6) Head-to-head away goals scored; 7) Play-off if relevant for deciding champion, relegation or participating in a European league, otherwise by draw. 8) Penalty shoot-out (only after a play-off)
(C) Champions

==== Results summary ====
Overall								Home						Away					
Pld	W	D	L	GF	GA	GD	Pts	W	D	L	GF	GA	GD	W	D	L	GF	GA	GD
34	26	5	3	87	39	+48	83	15	2	0	44	9	+35	11	3	3	43	30	+13

==== Matches ====
12 August 2017 1	PSV	3–2	AZ	Eindhoven
18:30	Lozano 31'; Pereiro 48'; Van Ginkel 76'	Report	dos Santos 18'; Weghorst 81' (pen.); Vejinović (yellow card) 39'; Vlaar (yellow card) 79'; Seuntjens (yellow card) 90+2'	Stadium: Philips Stadion; Attendance: 32,700; Referee: Björn Kuipers

20 August 2017 2	NAC Breda	1–4	PSV	Breda
16:45	Ambrose 41' (pen.); Horsfield (yellow card) 42'; El Allouchi (yellow card) 50'; Marí (yellow card) 89'	Report	Bergwijn 17', (yellow card) 50'; Van Ginkel 60'; Lozano 69'; Hendrix 87'	Stadium: Rat Verlegh Stadion; Attendance: 18,788; Referee: Pol van Boekel

27 August 2017 3	PSV	2–0	Roda JC	Eindhoven
16:45	Locadia 9'; Lozano 24'	Report	Ananou (yellow card) 55'	Stadium: Philips Stadion; Attendance: 32,200; Referee: Danny Makkelie

10 September 2017 4	Heerenveen	2–0	PSV	Heerenveen
12:30	Zeneli 4'; Ghoochannejhad 6'	Report	Lozano (red card) 37'; Luckassen (yellow card) 56'; Isimat-Mirin (yellow card) 74'; Hendrix (yellow card) 90'	Stadium: Abe Lenstra Stadion; Attendance: 22,345; Referee: Kevin Blom

17 September 2017 5	PSV	1–0	Feyenoord	Eindhoven
16:45	Pereiro 2'; Bergwijn (yellow card) 50'; Ramselaar (yellow card) 87'	Report	Berghuis (yellow card) 16' (yellow-red card) 43'; Van der Heijden (yellow card) 23'; Haps (yellow card) 60'; Toornstra (yellow card) 68'	Stadium: Philips Stadion; Attendance: 35,000; Referee: Björn Kuipers

24 September 2017 6	Utrecht	1–7	PSV	Utrecht
12:30	Labyad 21' (pen.); Klaiber (yellow card) 24'; Bahebeck (yellow card) 32'; Troupée (red card) 84'	Report	Locadia 15', 49', 68', 85' (pen.); Lozano 40'; Van Ginkel 80' (pen.); Bergwijn 90'; Isimat-Mirin (yellow card) 48'; Luckassen (yellow card) 65'	Stadium: Stadion Galgenwaard; Attendance: 22,006; Referee: Serdar Gözübüyük

30 September 2017 7	PSV	4–0	Willem II	Eindhoven
19:45	Lozano 49', 58'; Pereiro 55'; Van Ginkel 70' (pen.)	Report	Lachman (yellow card) 53'; Wellenreuther (yellow card) 68'; Heerkens (yellow card) 68'	Stadium: Philips Stadion; Attendance: 32,500; Referee: Jeroen Manschot

15 October 2017 8	VVV-Venlo	2–5	PSV	Venlo
14:30	Leemans 40' (pen.); Hunte 48'; Janse (yellow card) 8'; Promes (red card) 61'	Report	Locadia 23'; Pereiro 58', 85'; Schwaab 67'; Mauro Júnior 72'; Arias (yellow card) 4'; Isimat-Mirin (yellow card) 39'	Stadium: De Koel; Attendance: 8,000; Referee: Danny Makkelie

22 October 2017 9	PSV	3–0	Heracles Almelo	Eindhoven
12:30	Lozano 18'; Van Ginkel 78', 90+1' (pen.); Locadia (yellow card) 39'	Report	Hardeveld (yellow card) 76'; Pelupessy (yellow card) 81'; Droste (yellow card) 85'; Pröpper (red card) 90'	Stadium: Philips Stadion; Attendance: 32,800; Referee: Ed Janssen

29 October 2017 10	Vitesse	2–4	PSV	Arnhem
12:30	Locadia 45' (o.g.); Mount 63'; Dabo (yellow card) 13'; Büttner (yellow card) 67'; Miazga (yellow card) 72'	Report	Lozano 18', 59'; Locadia 49', 56'; Van Ginkel (yellow card) 4'; Schwaab (yellow card) 25'; Pereiro (yellow card) 38'; Arias (yellow card) 67'	Stadium: GelreDome; Referee: Serdar Gözübüyük

5 November 2017 11	PSV	4–3	Twente	Eindhoven
16:45	Locadia 14'; Van Ginkel 61' (pen.); De Jong 72'; Thesker 90+1' (o.g.); Ramselaar (yellow card) 90+5'	Report	Thesker 21', (yellow card) 15'; Lam 68', (yellow card) 90+4'; Jensen 75'	Stadium: Philips Stadion; Attendance: 33,040; Referee: Dennis Higler

19 November 2017 12	PEC Zwolle	0–1	PSV	Zwolle
14:30	Van Polen	Report	Isimat-Mirin 90+3'; Hendrix (yellow card) 13'; Van Ginkel (yellow card) 61'; Luckassen (yellow card) 64'	Stadium: MAC³PARK Stadion; Attendance: 13,250; Referee: Björn Kuipers

26 November 2017 13	Excelsior	1–2	PSV	Rotterdam
14:30	Koolwijk 52'; Mattheij (yellow card) 62'; Fortes (yellow card) 86'	Report	Mattheij 13' (o.g.); Lozano 41'; Isimat-Mirin (yellow card) 82'	Stadium: Stadion Woudestein; Attendance: 4,400; Referee: Jochem Kamphuis

3 December 2017 14	PSV	1–0	Sparta Rotterdam	Eindhoven
14:30	De Jong 52'; Bergwijn (yellow card) 33'	Report	Holst (yellow card) 86'	Stadium: Philips Stadion; Attendance: 33,000; Referee: Siemen Mulder

10 December 2017 15	Ajax	3–0	PSV	Amsterdam
16:45	Neres 61'; Schöne 64', (yellow card) 27'; Van de Beek 72'; Wöber (yellow card) 62'; Zeefuik (yellow card) 90+2'	Report	Hendrix (yellow card) 27'; Brenet (yellow card) 34'; Lozano (yellow card) 40'; Van Ginkel (yellow card) 59'	Stadium: Amsterdam ArenA; Attendance: 52,379; Referee: Kevin Blom

13 December 2017 16	Groningen	3–3	PSV	Groningen
18:30	Van Nieff 31', (yellow card) 90+1'; Veldwijk 54' (pen.); Te Wierik 90+5'; Idrissi (yellow card) 40'; Reis (yellow card) 74'	Report	Van Ginkel 7', 37' (pen.); Ramselaar 16'; Lozano (yellow card) 39'; Zoet (yellow card) 90+2'	Stadium: Euroborg; Attendance: 19,500; Referee: Bas Nijhuis

16 December 2017 17	PSV	3–0	ADO Den Haag	Eindhoven
19:45	De Jong 5', 7'; Van Ginkel 35' (pen.); Arias (yellow card) 74'	Report	Meißner (yellow card) 12' (yellow-red card) 80'; Becker (yellow card) 32'; Kuipers (yellow card) 34'; Zwinkels (yellow card) 42'	Stadium: Philips Stadion; Attendance: 32,700; Referee: Björn Kuipers

23 December 2017 18	PSV	2–1	Vitesse	Eindhoven
19:45	Schwaab 43'; Lozano 53'	Report	Matavž 32'; Miazga (yellow card) 17'; Lelieveld (yellow card) 43'; Faye (yellow card) 55'; Bruns (yellow card) 80'	Stadium: Philips Stadion; Attendance: 33,800; Referee: Dennis Higler

21 January 2018 19	Heracles Almelo	1–2	PSV	Almelo
16:45	Hardeveld 66' (pen.)	Report	Bergwijn 45+1'; De Jong 90+3'; Lozano (yellow card) 58'; Arias (yellow card) 65'	Stadium: Polman Stadion; Attendance: 11,211; Referee: Ed Janssen

27 January 2018 20	Twente	0–2	PSV	Enschede
19:45	Maher (yellow card) 90+2'	Report	Lozano 4'; Arias 90'	Stadium: De Grolsch Veste; Attendance: 25,700; Referee: Kevin Blom

3 February 2018 21	PSV	4–0	PEC Zwolle	Eindhoven
19:45	De Jong 45+3', 65', 72'; Brenet 78'; Van Ginkel (yellow card) 20'	Report	Freire (yellow card) 39'; Van der Hart (red card) 42'	Stadium: Philips Stadion; Attendance: 32,800; Referee: Serdar Gözübüyük

7 February 2018 22	PSV	1–0	Excelsior	Eindhoven
18:30	Lozano 17'; Brenet (yellow card) 69'; Bergwijn (yellow card) 76'	Report	Fortes (yellow card) 42'; Mattheij (yellow card) 69'; Vermeulen (yellow card) 82'	Stadium: Philips Stadion; Attendance: 32,100; Referee: Allard Lindhout

10 February 2018 23	Sparta Rotterdam	1–2	PSV	Rotterdam
19:45	Dougall 6'	Report	Bergwijn 41', 56'	Stadium: Sparta Stadion Het Kasteel; Attendance: 10,591; Referee: Bas Nijhuis

17 February 2018 24	PSV	2–2	Heerenveen	Eindhoven
18:30	Arias 34'; De Jong 43'; Lozano (red card) 45'; Hendrix (yellow card) 48'	Report	Schaars 56', (yellow card) 61'; Ghoochannejhad 82'; Dumfries (yellow card) 76'	Stadium: Philips Stadion; Attendance: 33,500; Referee: Dennis Higler

25 February 2018 25	Feyenoord	1–3	PSV	Rotterdam
14:30	Vilhena 53'; Amrabat (yellow card) 32'; Van der Heijden (yellow card) 50'; Botteghin (yellow card) 55'; El Ahmadi (yellow card) 72'	Report	Arias 23'; Bergwijn 34'; Pereiro 58'	Stadium: De Kuip; Attendance: 47,500; Referee: Danny Makkelie

3 March 2018 26	PSV	3–0	Utrecht	Eindhoven
18:30	Leeuwin 16' (o.g.); De Jong 22'; Bergwijn 51'; Pereiro (yellow card) 37'; Hendrix (yellow card) 71'	Report	Klich (yellow card) 87'	Stadium: Philips Stadion; Attendance: 33,800; Referee: Kevin Blom

10 March 2018 27	Willem II	5–0	PSV	Tilburg
19:45	Rienstra 21', 76'; Sol 59', 70' (pen.), 90' (pen.); Tsimikas (yellow card) 24'	Report	De Jong (yellow card) 41'; Luckassen (yellow card) 69' (yellow-red card) 90'	Stadium: Koning Willem II Stadion; Attendance: 13,650; Referee: Björn Kuipers

17 March 2018 28	PSV	3–0	VVV-Venlo	Eindhoven
19:45	Van Ginkel 68', 83' (pen.); Lozano 80'	Report	Seuntjens (yellow card) 45+2' (yellow-red card) 58'	Stadium: Philips Stadion; Attendance: 33,900; Referee: Serdar Gözübüyük

31 March 2018 29	PSV	5–1	NAC Breda	Eindhoven
19:45	Van Ginkel 37' (pen.); Sadiq 59' (o.g.); De Jong 76'; Mets 81' (o.g.); Pereiro 84'; Bergwijn (yellow card) 41'; Hendrix (yellow card) 57'	Report	Sadiq 64', (yellow card) 41'; Ambrose (yellow card) 9'; Vloet (yellow card) 14'; Marí (yellow card) 68'	Stadium: Philips Stadion; Attendance: 34,300; Referee: Pol van Boekel

7 April 2018 30	AZ	2–3	PSV	Alkmaar
19:45	Weghorst 53', 61', (yellow card) 77'; Vlaar (yellow card) 78' (red card) 89'; Midtsjø (yellow card) 89'	Report	Pereiro 74'; Lozano 76'; Van Ginkel 79' (pen.); Malen (yellow card) 90+1'	Stadium: AFAS Stadion; Attendance: 17,023; Referee: Kevin Blom

15 April 2018 31	PSV	3–0	Ajax	Eindhoven
16:45	Pereiro 23'; L. de Jong 38'; Bergwijn 54'; Hendrix (yellow card) 30'	Report	Tagliafico (yellow card) 35' (yellow-red card) 80'; S. de Jong (red card) 83'; Onana (yellow card) 83'; Neres (yellow card) 86'	Stadium: Philips Stadion; Attendance: 35,000; Referee: Danny Makkelie

18 April 2018 32	Roda JC	2–2	PSV	Kerkrade
18:30	Vansteenkiste 29'; Gustafson 65'	Report	Lozano 32'; Hendrix 86'	Stadium: Parkstad Limburg Stadion; Attendance: 15,383; Referee: Serdar Gözübüyük

29 April 2018 33	ADO Den Haag	3–3	PSV	The Hague
14:30	Johnsen 16', 72'; El Khayati 27' (pen.); Beugelsdijk (yellow card) 85'	Report	Lozano 11'; Pereiro 58', 85'; Arias (yellow card) 45+2'	Stadium: Cars Jeans Stadion; Attendance: 14,031; Referee: Pol van Boekel

6 May 2018 34	PSV	0–0	Groningen	Eindhoven
14:30	Lozano (yellow card) 13'	Report	Te Wierik (yellow card) 13'; Doan (yellow card) 14'	Stadium: Philips Stadion; Attendance: 33,700; Referee: Ed Janssen

=== KNVB Cup ===
21 September 2017 1	SDC Putten	0–4	PSV	Putten
20:45		Report	Maher 6', 70'; Luckassen 61', (yellow card) 86'; Lammers 79'	Stadium: Sportpark Puttereng; Referee: Ed Janssen

26 October 2017 2	Volendam	0–2 (a.e.t.)	PSV	Volendam
18:30	Mertens (red card) 114'	Report	Van Ginkel 107'; Lozano 119'	Stadium: Kras Stadion; Attendance: 6,404; Referee: Bas Nijhuis

20 December 2017 3	PSV	4–1	VVV-Venlo	Eindhoven
18:30	De Jong 45+2'; Van Ginkel 66'; Lozano 79'; Isimat-Mirin 90+3'	Report	Rutten 41'; Janssen (yellow card) 33'; Leemans (yellow card) 52'; Van Crooy (yellow card) 61'	Stadium: Philips Stadion; Attendance: 31,800; Referee: Danny Makkelie

31 January 2018 Quarter-final	Feyenoord	2–0	PSV	Rotterdam
20:45	Larsson 3'; Vilhena 35'; Toornstra (yellow card) 7'; Malacia (yellow card) 29'; Van Beek (yellow card) 70'	Report	De Jong (yellow card) 4'; Hendrix (yellow card) 76'; Van Ginkel (yellow card) 89'	Stadium: De Kuip; Referee: Pol van Boekel

=== UEFA Europa League ===
==== Qualifying rounds ====
27 July 2017 Q3, 1st leg	PSV	0–1	Osijek	Eindhoven
19:00	Bergwijn (yellow card) 64'	Report	Barišić 57' (pen.); Lyopa (yellow card) 60'; Mudražija (yellow card) 64'; Lukić (yellow card) 90+2'	Stadium: Philips Stadion; Attendance: 32,000; Referee: Andrew Dallas

3 August 2017 Q3, 2nd leg	Osijek	1–0 (2–0 agg.)	PSV	Osijek
19:00	Bočkaj 25', (yellow card) 87'; Mioč (yellow card) 11'; Mudražija (yellow card) 90+4'	Report	Brenet (yellow card) 57'; Locadia (yellow card) 59'; Pereiro (yellow card) 90'; Hendrix (yellow card) 90+2'	Stadium: Stadion Gradski vrt Referee: Hugo Miguel

== Statistics ==
=== Appearances and goals ===
No.	Pos	Nat	Player	Total		ERE		EL		KNVB Cup	
No.	Pos	Nat	Player	Apps	Goals	Apps	Goals	Apps	Goals	Apps	Goals
1	GK	(Netherlands) NED	Jeroen Zoet	38	0	32	0	2	0	4	0
2	DF	(France) FRA	Nicolas Isimat-Mirin	36	2	32	1	2	0	2	1
3	DF	(Netherlands) NED	Derrick Luckassen	22	1	9+10	0	1	0	1+1	1
4	DF	(Colombia) COL	Santiago Arias	36	3	31	3	2	0	3	0
5	DF	(Germany) GER	Daniel Schwaab	35	2	30	2	1	0	4	0
6	MF	(Netherlands) NED	Davy Pröpper	2	0	0	0	1+1	0	0	0
7	MF	(Uruguay) URU	Gastón Pereiro	33	11	21+7	11	0+2	0	2+1	0
8	MF	(Netherlands) NED	Jorrit Hendrix	39	2	33	2	2	0	4	0
9	FW	(Netherlands) NED	Luuk de Jong	33	13	22+6	12	1+1	0	3	1
10	MF	(Netherlands) NED	Marco van Ginkel	33	16	28	14	2	0	1+2	2
11	FW	(Mexico) MEX	Hirving Lozano	34	19	29	17	1+1	0	3	2
13	GK	(Curaçao) CUW	Eloy Room	3	0	2+1	0	0	0	0	0
14	FW	(Netherlands) NED	Sam Lammers	11	1	1+6	0	0+1	0	1+2	1
16	MF	(Belgium) BEL	Dante Rigo	3	0	0+2	0	0	0	0+1	0
17	FW	(Netherlands) NED	Steven Bergwijn	37	8	28+5	8	2	0	1+1	0
18	MF	(Netherlands) NED	Pablo Rosario	15	0	2+12	0	0	0	0+1	0
19	FW	(Netherlands) NED	Jürgen Locadia	18	9	15	9	2	0	1	0
20	DF	(Netherlands) NED	Joshua Brenet	38	1	32	1	2	0	4	0
21	GK	(Netherlands) NED	Luuk Koopmans	0	0	0	0	0	0	0	0
22	FW	(Argentina) ARG	Maximiliano Romero	0	0	0	0	0	0	0	0
23	MF	(Netherlands) NED	Bart Ramselaar	36	1	18+13	1	1	0	4	0
24	MF	(Sweden) SWE	Ramon Pascal Lundqvist	0	0	0	0	0	0	0	0
25	MF	(Netherlands) NED	Adam Maher	3	2	0+1	0	0	0	2	2
29	FW	(Iceland) ISL	Albert Guðmundsson	12	0	1+8	0	0	0	1+2	0
30	DF	(Netherlands) NED	Jordy de Wijs	1	0	0+1	0	0	0	0	0
31	GK	(Netherlands) NED	Yanick van Osch	0	0	0	0	0	0	0	0
32	DF	(Netherlands) NED	Kenneth Paal	6	0	4+1	0	0	0	1	0
35	FW	(Netherlands) NED	Donyell Malen	4	0	0+4	0	0	0	0	0
47	FW	(Brazil) BRA	Mauro Júnior	17	1	5+10	1	0	0	1+1	0
50	DF	(Netherlands) NED	Armando Obispo	2	0	0+2	0	0	0	0	0
52	FW	(Netherlands) NED	Cody Gakpo	1	0	0+1	0	0	0	0	0

=== Disciplinary record ===
No.	Nat.	Name	Eredivisie			Europa League			KNVB Cup			Total		
No.	Nat.	Name	Yellow card	(yellow card) (yellow-red card)	Red card	Yellow card	(yellow card) (yellow-red card)	Red card	Yellow card	(yellow card) (yellow-red card)	Red card	Yellow card	(yellow card) (yellow-red card)	Red card
1	(Netherlands)	Jeroen Zoet	1	0	0	0	0	0	0	0	0	1	0	0
2	(France)	Nicolas Isimat-Mirin	4	0	0	0	0	0	0	0	0	4	0	0
3	(Netherlands)	Derrick Luckassen	3	1	0	0	0	0	1	0	0	4	1	0
4	(Colombia)	Santiago Arias	5	0	0	0	0	0	0	0	0	5	0	0
5	(Germany)	Daniel Schwaab	1	0	0	0	0	0	0	0	0	1	0	0
7	(Uruguay)	Gastón Pereiro	2	0	0	0	0	0	0	0	0	2	0	0
8	(Netherlands)	Jorrit Hendrix	7	0	0	1	0	0	1	0	0	9	0	0
9	(Netherlands)	Luuk de Jong	1	0	0	0	0	0	1	0	0	2	0	0
10	(Netherlands)	Marco van Ginkel	4	0	0	0	0	0	1	0	0	5	0	0
11	(Mexico)	Hirving Lozano	4	0	2	0	0	0	0	0	0	4	0	2
17	(Netherlands)	Steven Bergwijn	5	0	0	1	0	0	0	0	0	6	0	0
19	(Netherlands)	Jürgen Locadia	1	0	0	1	0	0	0	0	0	2	0	0
20	(Netherlands)	Joshua Brenet	2	0	0	1	0	0	0	0	0	3	0	0
23	(Netherlands)	Bart Ramselaar	2	0	0	0	0	0	0	0	0	2	0	0
35	(Netherlands)	Donyell Malen	1	0	0	0	0	0	0	0	0	1	0	0
Total			43	1	2	4	0	0	4	0	0	51	1	2

== Transfers ==
=== Transfers in ===
First Team
Date from	Position	Nationality	Name	From	Fee	Ref.
19 June 2017	LW	(Mexico)	Hirving Lozano	(Mexico) Pachuca	€8,000,000	
11 July 2017	CB	(Netherlands)	Derrick Luckassen	(Netherlands) AZ	€5,000,000	
16 August 2017	GK	(Curaçao)	Eloy Room	(Netherlands) Vitesse	?	

=== Transfers out ===
First Team
Date from	Position	Nationality	Name	To	Fee	Ref.
13 June 2017	CB	(Mexico)	Héctor Moreno	(Italy) Roma	€5,700,000	
30 June 2017	MF	(Netherlands)	Rai Vloet	(Netherlands) NAC Breda	€100,000	
3 July 2016	CB	(Netherlands)	Menno Koch	(Netherlands) Utrecht	€100,000	
5 July 2017	GK	(Netherlands)	Remko Pasveer	(Netherlands) Vitesse	€450,000	
7 July 2017	MF	(Mexico)	Andrés Guardado	(Spain) Real Betis	€2,500,000	
21 July 2017	LB	(Netherlands)	Jetro Willems	(Germany) Eintracht Frankfurt	€5,000,000	
7 August 2017	MF	(Netherlands)	Davy Pröpper	(England) Brighton & Hove Albion	?	
15 January 2018	MF	(Netherlands)	Adam Maher	(Netherlands) Twente	Free	
19 January 2018	CF	(Netherlands)	Jürgen Locadia	(England) Brighton & Hove Albion	?	

=== Loans in ===
First Team
Date from	Position	Nationality	Name	From	Fee	Ref.
17 July 2017	MF	(Netherlands)	Marco van Ginkel	(England) Chelsea	On loan	
21 December 2017	CF	(Argentina)	Maximiliano Romero	(Argentina) Vélez Sarsfield	On loan	

=== Loans out ===
First Team
Date from	Position	Nationality	Name	To	Fee	Ref.
30 June 2017	GK	(Netherlands)	Hidde Jurjus	(Netherlands) Roda JC	On loan	
31 August 2017	CB	(Netherlands)	Jordy de Wijs	(Netherlands) Excelsior	On loan	
