= Ait Izzou =

Place in Drâa-Tafilalet, Morocco

Ait Izzou (Arabic: ايت إيزو) is a small town in the Moroccan region of Drâa-Tafilalet.

== Born in Ait Izzou ==
- Adam Maher (1993), Dutch-Moroccan football player
