= Erik Falkenburg =

Dutch footballer (born 1988)

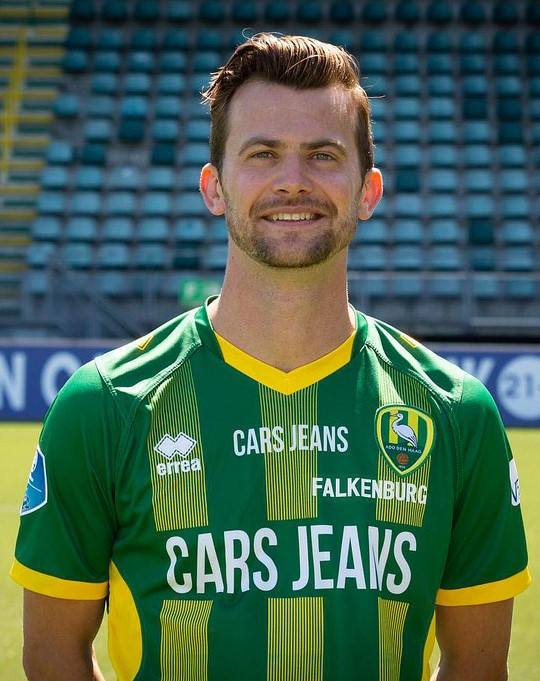
- Falkenburg at ADO Den Haag in July 2018

Personal information
- Date of birth: 5 May 1988 (age 38)
- Place of birth: Leiden, Netherlands
- Height: 1.87 m (6 ft 2 in)
- Position: Attacking midfielder

Youth career
- 1993–2000: Oegstgeest
- 2000–2001: UVS
- 2001–2007: Sparta

Senior career*
Years	Team	Apps	(Gls)
2007–2010	Sparta	62	(13)
2010–2014	AZ	44	(10)
2013	→ NEC (loan)	14	(2)
2013–2014	→ Go Ahead Eagles (loan)	31	(9)
2014–2015	NAC	27	(5)
2015–2017	Willem II	62	(16)
2017–2020	ADO Den Haag	69	(11)
2020–2021	Roda JC	29	(9)
Total		338	(75)

International career
2009	Netherlands U-20	4	(0)
2009–2010	Netherlands U-21	3	(3)
- * Club domestic league appearances and goals as of 20 May 2021

Erik Falkenburg (born 5 May 1988) is a Dutch retired footballer who played as an attacking midfielder.

== Club career ==
Born in Leiden, he came through the youth system at and made his professional debut for Sparta Rotterdam on 23 January 2008 against PSV. At Sparta he played alongside future international players Kevin Strootman and Nick Viergever. He and Viergever left the club for AZ in 2010. Not a regular starter at AZ, he joined NEC on loan in January 2013 and he was sent on loan the next season to Go Ahead Eagles.

After his contract with AZ expired in summer 2014, Falkenburg moved to NAC, who surprisingly beat Cambuur, Go Ahead and Willem II for his signature despite being in financial trouble. He did join eternal rivals Willem II however the next season after NAC was relegated to the Eerste Divisie. The attacking midfielder changed clubs once more, when he teamed up with ADO Den Haag in 2017.

On 10 September 2020, Falkenburg signed a one-year contract with Roda JC in the Eerste Divisie. He left the club as his contract expired in July 2021.

In summer 2023, Falkenburg (who already lived in Amsterdam), joined local amateur side AVV Swift as a player and academy coach but left them after only three games and was snapped up by fellow amateurs LSVV’70 in his hometown Leiden a year later.

== International career ==
Falkenburg played three matches for the Netherlands U-21s in 2009 and 2010, scoring three goals.

== Career statistics ==
As of match played 20 May 2021

Appearances and goals by club, season and competition
Club	Season	League			National Cup		Other		Total	
Club	Season	Division	Apps	Goals	Apps	Goals	Apps	Goals	Apps	Goals
Sparta Rotterdam	2007–08	Eredivisie	2	0	0	0	0	0	2	0
Sparta Rotterdam	2008–09	Eredivisie	30	3	1	0	0	0	31	3
Sparta Rotterdam	2009–10	Eredivisie	30	10	3	2	4	1	37	13
Sparta Rotterdam	Total		62	13	4	2	4	1	70	16
AZ	2010–11	Eredivisie	19	4	3	0	9	1	31	5
AZ	2011–12	Eredivisie	11	3	1	0	8	2	20	5
AZ	2012–13	Eredivisie	14	3	1	0	2	0	17	3
AZ	Total		44	10	5	0	19	3	68	13
NEC	2012–13	Eredivisie	14	2	0	0	0	0	14	2
Go Ahead Eagles	2013–14	Eredivisie	31	9	2	1	0	0	33	10
NAC Breda	2014–15	Eredivisie	27	5	2	1	0	0	29	6
Willem II	2015–16	Eredivisie	34	11	2	0	4	4	40	15
Willem II	2016–17	Eredivisie	28	5	0	0	0	0	28	5
Willem II	Total		62	16	2	0	4	4	68	20
ADO Den Haag	2017–18	Eredivisie	29	5	1	0	2	0	32	5
ADO Den Haag	2018–19	Eredivisie	24	5	0	0	0	0	24	5
ADO Den Haag	2019–20	Eredivisie	16	1	1	0	0	0	17	1
ADO Den Haag	Total		69	11	2	0	2	0	73	11
Roda JC Kerkrade	2020–21	Eerste Divisie	29	9	0	0	2	0	31	9
Career total			338	75	19	4	50	8	388	87
