= Jorrit Hendrix =

Dutch footballer (born 1995)

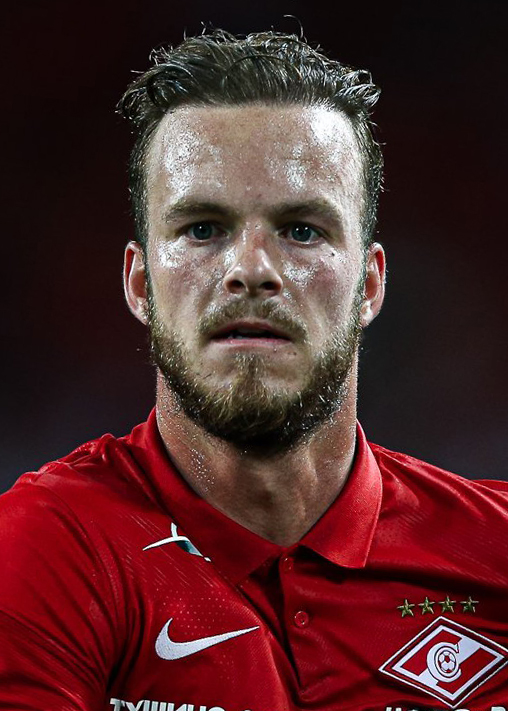
- Hendrix with Spartak Moscow in 2021

Personal information
- Full name: Jorrit Petrus Carolina Hendrix
- Date of birth: 6 February 1995 (age 31)
- Place of birth: Panningen, Netherlands
- Height: 1.82 m (6 ft 0 in)
- Position: Midfielder

Team information
- Current team: Fortuna Düsseldorf
- Number: 8

Youth career
- –2004: SV Panningen
- 2004–2013: PSV

Senior career*
Years	Team	Apps	(Gls)
2013–2016	Jong PSV	8	(1)
2013–2021	PSV	238	(8)
2021–2022	Spartak Moscow	22	(0)
2022	→ Feyenoord (loan)	9	(1)
2022–2023	Fortuna Düsseldorf	20	(0)
2023–2024	Western Sydney Wanderers	20	(1)
2024–2026	Preußen Münster	63	(8)
2026–	Fortuna Düsseldorf	0	(0)

International career^{‡}
2009–2010	Netherlands U15	4	(2)
2010–2011	Netherlands U16	6	(0)
2011–2012	Netherlands U17	12	(1)
2012–2013	Netherlands U18	2	(0)
2012–2014	Netherlands U19	8	(0)
2014–2016	Netherlands U21	7	(0)
2016	Netherlands	1	(0)
- * Club domestic league appearances and goals as of 18 May 2026 ‡ National team caps and goals as of 16 September 2023

Jorrit Petrus Carolina Hendrix (born 6 February 1995) is a Dutch professional footballer who plays as a defensive midfielder for German 3. Liga club Fortuna Düsseldorf.

== Club career ==
=== PSV ===
Hendrix started playing youth football at hometown club SV Panningen. From there, he joined the youth academy of PSV Eindhoven in 2004. Hendrix made his professional debut as a Jong PSV player in the second-tier Eerste Divisie on 3 August 2013 against Sparta Rotterdam. A week later, he made his Eredivisie debut against NEC in a 5–0 home win. He replaced Karim Rekik after 86 minutes. Ten days after his official debut, Hendrix signed a new contract with PSV, which tied him to the club until 2017. On 31 August 2013, he made his first start against Cambuur at home. Hendrix scored the first goal for the PSV first team on 26 October 2014. That day, he scored the 3–0 in the 25th minute of a league match against Utrecht. Hendrix won his first league title with PSV on 18 April 2015, after the club had kept a table lead since the second matchday of the season. A 4–1 victory at home against Heerenveen on matchday 31 ensured the title. As a result, Hendrix made his debut in the UEFA Champions League main tournament on 15 September 2015. That day, PSV beat Manchester United 2–1 at home, with Hendrix playing the entire game.

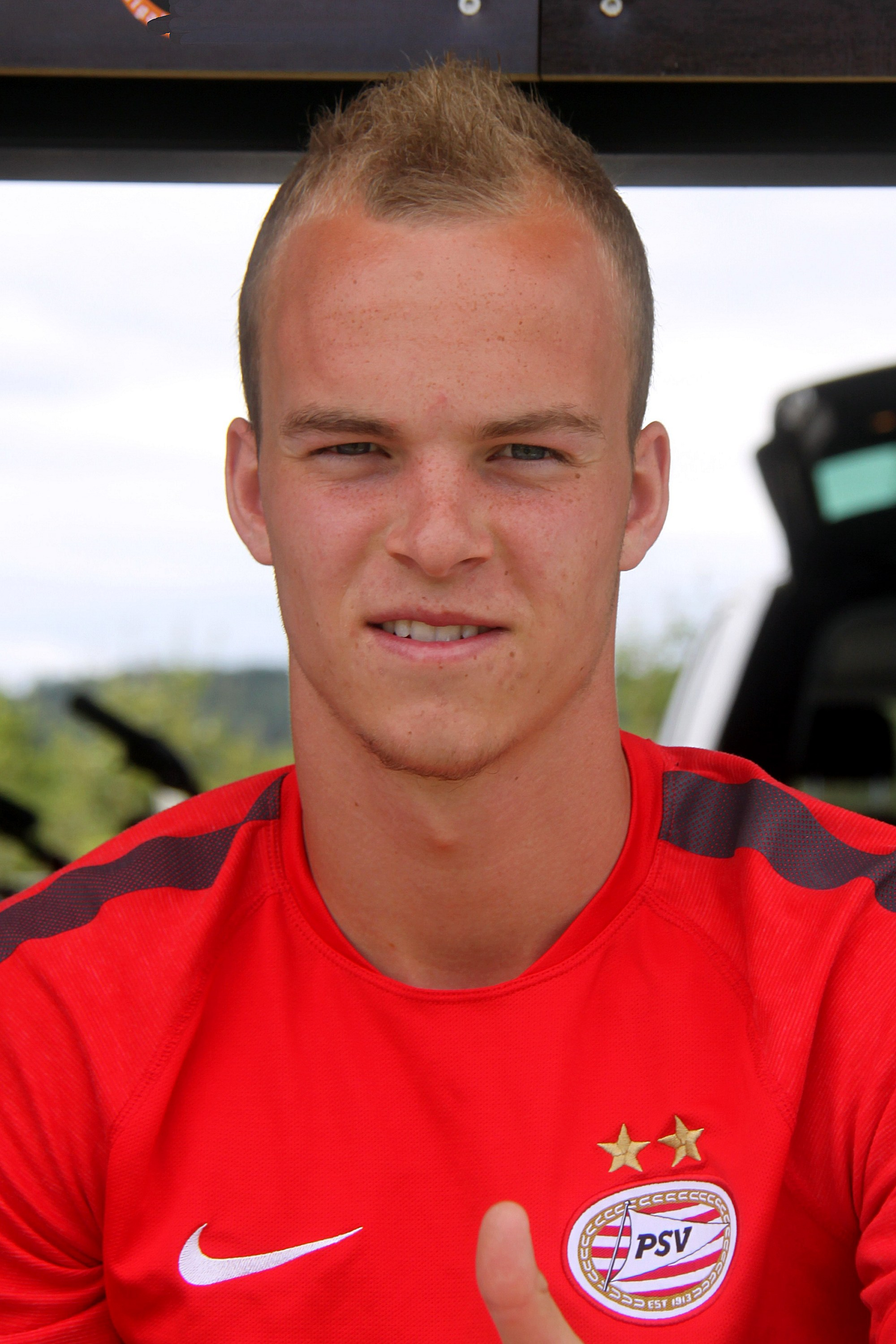
Hendrix with PSV in 2014

Hendrix scored the only goal of the game on 5 December 2015 during a 1–0 competition match against Vitesse. By doing this, he ensured that PSV scored at least one goal for the 42nd league game in a row, a new record in the Eredivisie. This record eventually rose to 54 league games. On 18 December 2015, Hendrix extended his contract with PSV until 2020. He won the league title with PSV for the second time in a row on 8 May 2016. The club started the last matchday of the season with the same number of points as rivals Ajax, but with a negative six goal difference. PSV beat PEC Zwolle 1–3 that day, while Ajax drew 1–1 at De Graafschap. Hendrix saw this happen from the stands, as he missed the last four games of the season due to an injury.

Hendrix started the 2016–17 season as a starter. Upon midfielder Stijn Schaars' departure, Hendrix was given the number 8 shirt. During a Champions League match against FC Rostov in late September, he left the pitch with a knee injury. This injury kept him sidelined until he made his comeback on 14 January 2017, in a league game won at home over Excelsior. He did not return as a starter that year, with fellow midfielders Andrés Guardado and Davy Pröpper almost always preferred, and Siem de Jong, newcomer Bart Ramselaar and especially Marco van Ginkel competing heavily for the spot in midfield. Hendrix returned as a starter for the 2017–18 season from the first matchday. In that role, he won the national title with PSV for the third time that year, with the team beating Ajax 3–0 on 15 April 2018 en route to clinch the championship. Hendrix signed a one-and-a-half-year contract extension with PSV on 14 January 2019 until mid-2021. That season, he faced competition for his position from Michal Sadílek, who already knew his new head coach Mark van Bommel from his time as the PSV U19 coach.

From his first 100 matches playing for PSV, they won 78. This places him in the top ten of players with the most Eredivisie victories in their first one hundred games. It is an illustrious list which includes Johan Cruijff, Johan Neeskens, Ruud Krol, Arie Haan, and Edwin van der Sar. Former Ajax player Horst Blankenburg leads the way with 83 victories in his first 100 games.

=== Spartak Moscow ===
On 12 January 2021, with less than six months left on his contract with PSV, Hendrix moved to Russian club Spartak Moscow on a deal worth €500,000. On 16 January 2021, Spartak confirmed that he signed a long-term contract with the club. On 17 January 2021, he held his first training session with Spartak at the winter training camp in Dubai. He made his debut for the club on 20 February 2021 in the starting lineup of the away match of the Russian Cup against Dynamo Moscow, a 0–2 loss. On 28 February, he made his league debut in the 0–2 home loss to Rubin Kazan.

==== Loan to Feyenoord ====
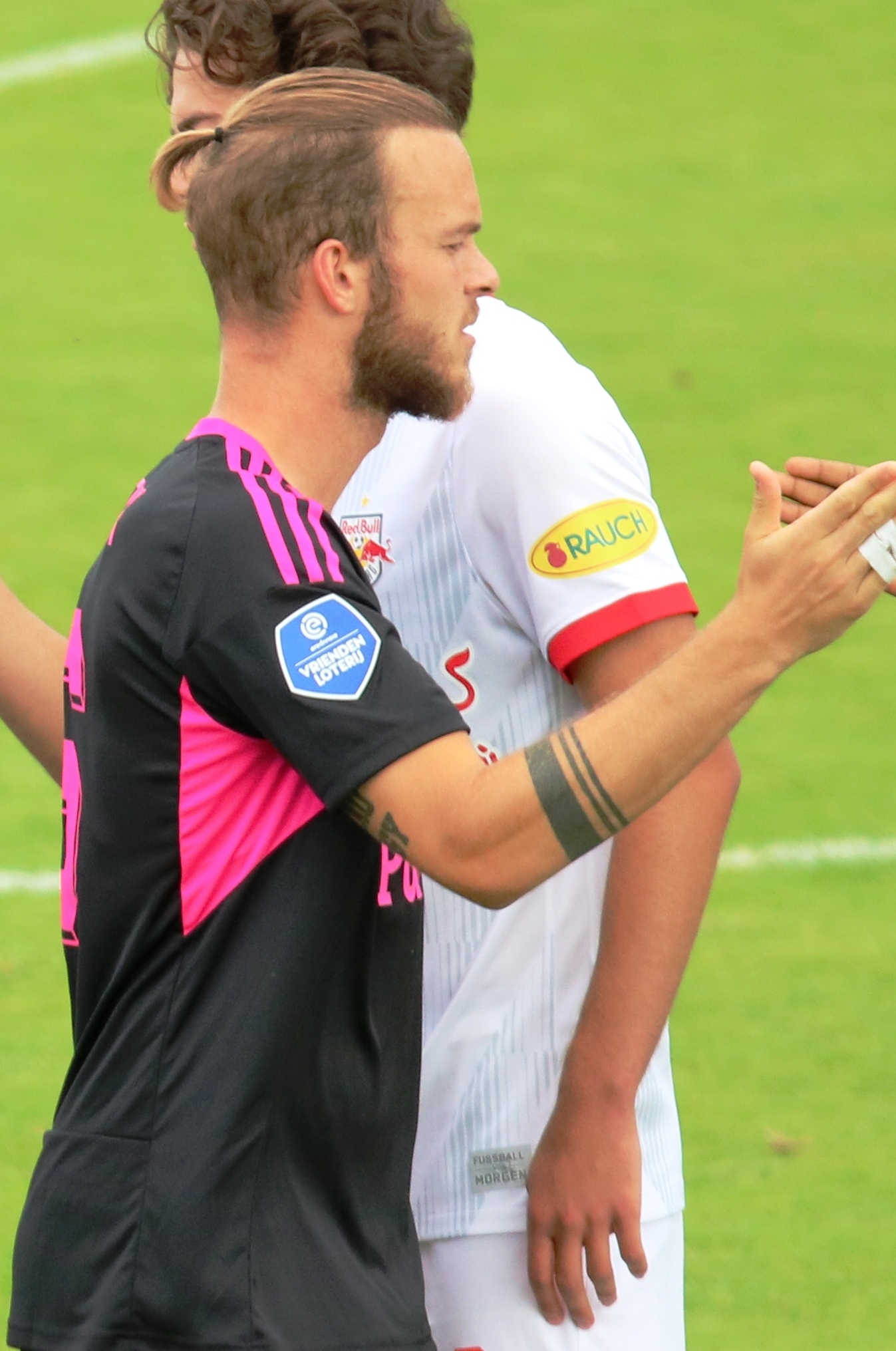
Hendrix with Feyenoord in 2022

On 26 January 2022, he joined Feyenoord on loan until the end of the 2021–22 season, with an option to buy.

=== Fortuna Düsseldorf ===
On 11 August 2022, Hendrix signed a one-season contract with Fortuna Düsseldorf in Germany.

=== Western Sydney Wanderers ===
On 16 September 2023, Hendrix joined A-League Men club Western Sydney Wanderers, on a one-year contract. On 10 July 2024, he departed the team following the end of his contract.

=== Preußen Münster ===
Hendrix joined Preußen Münster, newly promoted to the 2. Bundesliga, in July 2024.

== International career ==
Hendrix was called up to the senior Netherlands squad to face Greece and Sweden in August 2016.

== Career statistics ==
=== Club ===
As of match played on 23 July 2024

Appearances and goals by club, season and competition
Club	Season	League			Cup		Continental		Other		Total	
Club	Season	Division	Apps	Goals	Apps	Goals	Apps	Goals	Apps	Goals	Apps	Goals
PSV	2013–14	Eredivisie	20	0	2	0	5	0	—		27	0
PSV	2014–15	Eredivisie	20	1	2	0	11	0	—		33	1
PSV	2015–16	Eredivisie	26	2	3	0	7	0	1	0	37	2
PSV	2016–17	Eredivisie	19	1	1	0	2	0	1	0	23	1
PSV	2017–18	Eredivisie	33	2	4	0	2	0	—		39	2
PSV	2018–19	Eredivisie	29	1	0	0	8	0	1	0	38	1
PSV	2019–20	Eredivisie	17	1	1	0	6	0	1	0	25	1
PSV	2020–21	Eredivisie	9	0	1	0	6	0	—		16	0
PSV	Total		173	8	14	0	47	0	4	0	238	8
Jong PSV	2013–14	Eerste Divisie	4	0	—		—		—		4	0
Jong PSV	2014–15	Eerste Divisie	2	1	—		—		—		2	1
Jong PSV	2016–17	Eerste Divisie	2	0	—		—		—		2	0
Jong PSV	Total		8	1	—		—		—		8	1
Spartak Moscow	2020–21	Russian Premier League	10	0	1	0	—		—		11	0
Spartak Moscow	2021–22	Russian Premier League	8	0	0	0	3	0	—		11	0
Spartak Moscow	Total		18	0	1	0	3	0	0	0	22	0
Feyenoord (loan)	2021–22	Eredivisie	9	1	0	0	5	0	—		14	1
Fortuna Düsseldorf	2022–23	2. Bundesliga	20	0	1	0	—		—		21	0
Western Sydney Wanderers	2023–24	A-League Men	20	1	0	0	—		—		20	1
Preußen Münster	2024–25	2. Bundesliga	0	0	0	0	—		—		0	0
Career total			248	11	16	0	55	0	4	0	323	11

== Honours ==
PSV

- Eredivisie: 2014–15, 2015–16, 2017-18
- Johan Cruyff Shield: 2015, 2016
- Maspalomas Cup: 2015

Feyenoord

- UEFA Europa Conference League runner-up: 2021–22

Netherlands

- UEFA U-17 Championship: 2012
