= Vincent Müller =

German footballer (born 2000)

Personal information
- Full name: Vincent Carsten Maria Müller
- Date of birth: 23 August 2000 (age 26)
- Place of birth: Cologne, Germany
- Height: 1.90 m (6 ft 3 in)
- Position: Goalkeeper

Team information
- Current team: AaB
- Number: 1

Youth career
- –2007: SG Köln-Worringen
- 2007–2018: 1. FC Köln

Senior career*
Years	Team	Apps	(Gls)
2018–2019	1. FC Köln II	2	(0)
2019–2020	Würzburger Kickers	25	(0)
2020–2022	Jong PSV	27	(0)
2020–2022	PSV	0	(0)
2022–2024	MSV Duisburg	65	(1)
2024–	AaB	53	(0)
- * Club domestic league appearances and goals as of 2 June 2026

Vincent Carsten Maria Müller (born 23 August 2000) is a German professional footballer who plays as a goalkeeper for AaB.

== Career ==
=== Early career ===
After taking his first steps in youth football with local club SG Köln-Worringen, Cologne native Müller was accepted into the 1. FC Köln youth academy at the age of six.

Müller grew into first choice in goal in both the U17 and U19 teams of Die Geißböcke. With the U19 team, he finished third in the Under 19 Bundesliga West group in his final season and narrowly missed participation in the final round of the championship. That season he also appeared twice for the reserve team in the Regionalliga despite being a backup to Jan-Christoph Bartels and Brady Scott.

=== Würzburger Kickers ===
For the 2019–20 season, 19-year-old Müller signed a two-year contract with 3. Liga club Würzburger Kickers. From early-October onwards, Müller, originally planned as the third goalkeeper, replaced regular starter in goal Eric Verstappen, who had conceded 27 goals by then. Müller featured as a starter from then on and kept a clean sheet for four games, but broke his jaw on 2 June 2020 in a 1–0 home loss to 1. FC Magdeburg which sidelined him for two games. From 13 June and until the end of the season, Müller would continue as the starter in goal for the Kickers, keeping a clean sheet twice. Würzburger Kickers won promotion to the 2. Bundesliga at the end of the season.

=== PSV ===
After signing Fabian Giefer, who won the starting spot in goal in pre-season for Würzburg, Müller moved to Dutch Eredivisie club PSV in late-September 2020. There, he was united with German head coach Roger Schmidt and three other compatriots, including fellow goalkeeper Lars Unnerstall.

=== MSV Duisburg ===
Müller joined 3. Liga club MSV Duisburg on 21 June 2022, signing a two-year contract. He made his competitive debut for the club on the opening day of the 2022–23 season, playing the full game as his club lost 1–0 to VfL Osnabrück. On 21 August 2022, he scored the second goal in a 3–0 victory against SV Meppen, with a free-kick from his own half.

=== AaB ===
On May 23, 2024, newly promoted Danish Superliga club AaB confirmed that they had signed Müller on a contract until June 2028.

== Career statistics ==
As of 19 May 2024

Appearances and goals by club, season and competition
Club	Season	League			Cup		Europe		Other		Total	
Club	Season	Division	Apps	Goals	Apps	Goals	Apps	Goals	Apps	Goals	Apps	Goals
1. FC Köln II	2018–19	Regionalliga West	2	0	—		—		—		2	0
Würzburger Kickers	2019–20	3. Liga	25	0	0	0	—		—		25	0
Jong PSV	2020–21	Eerste Divisie	12	0	0	0	—		—		12	0
Jong PSV	2021–22	Eerste Divisie	15	0	0	0	—		—		15	0
Jong PSV	Total		27	0	0	0	0	0	0	0	27	0
MSV Duisburg	2022–23	3. Liga	31	1	—		—		—		31	1
MSV Duisburg	2023–24	3. Liga	34	0	—		—		—		34	0
MSV Duisburg	Total		65	1	0	0	—		—		65	1
Career total			119	1	0	0	—		—		119	1
