= Nick Viergever =

Dutch footballer (born 1989)

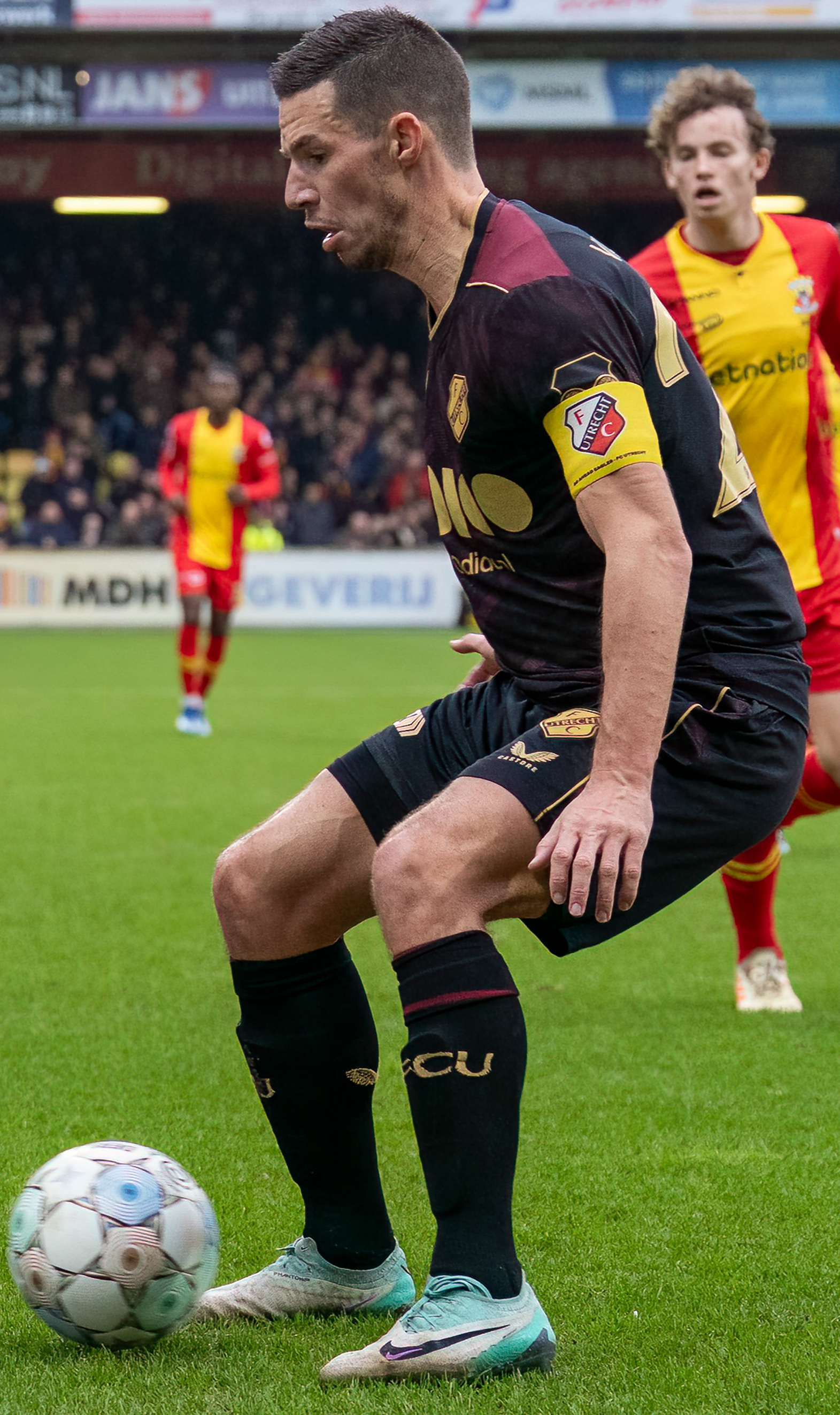
- Viergever playing for Utrecht in 2023

Personal information
- Full name: Nick Viergever
- Date of birth: 3 August 1989 (age 37)
- Place of birth: Capelle aan den IJssel, Netherlands
- Height: 1.83 m (6 ft 0 in)
- Positions: Centre-back; left-back

Team information
- Current team: PEC Zwolle
- Number: 24

Youth career
- Sparta Rotterdam

Senior career*
Years	Team	Apps	(Gls)
2008–2010	Sparta Rotterdam	30	(0)
2010–2014	AZ	110	(5)
2014–2018	Ajax	84	(6)
2015	Jong Ajax	4	(0)
2018–2021	PSV	75	(3)
2021–2022	Greuther Fürth	24	(0)
2022–2026	Utrecht	102	(6)
2026–	PEC Zwolle	0	(0)

International career
2009–2010	Netherlands U21	5	(0)
2012–2017	Netherlands	3	(0)
- * Club domestic league appearances and goals as of 17 May 2026

Nick Viergever (born 3 August 1989) is a Dutch professional footballer who plays as a defender for Eredivisie club PEC Zwolle. He also made three appearances for the Netherlands national team.

== Club career ==
=== Sparta Rotterdam ===
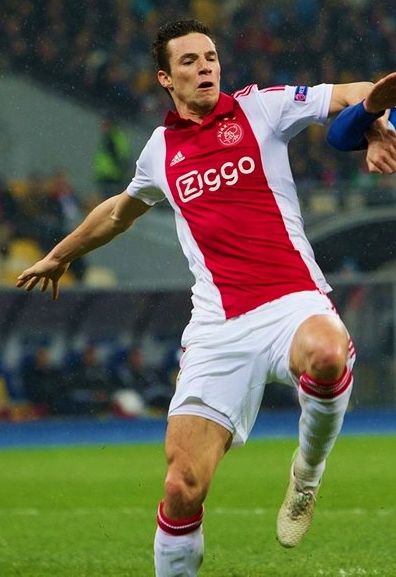
Viergever playing for Ajax in 2015

Viergever made his debut in the Eredivisie with Sparta Rotterdam in a 1–1 draw with NEC on 10 May 2009, coming on as a substitute for Edwin van Bueren in the second half.

=== AZ Alkmaar ===
In the summer of 2010, Viergever moved to AZ. He was named as vice-captain behind Maarten Martens at the beginning of the 2012–13 season, after Niklas Moisander and Rasmus Elm had left the club. With Martens ruled out through a long-term injury, Viergever skippered AZ for most of the season.

=== Ajax ===
On 24 May 2014, it was announced that Viergever had signed a four-year contract with Ajax. Viergever scored an important goal for Ajax against FC Schalke 04 in the quarter-finals of the UEFA Europa League. After a 2–0 victory in the first leg in Amsterdam Viergever saw his team trailing with 3–0 in the away game in Gelsenkirchen before hitting the net in 110th minute of extra time, sending his club to the semi-finals on away goals for the first time in over twenty years.

=== PSV ===
On 2 May 2018, Viergever signed a contract with PSV Eindhoven on a free transfer. Viergever said he understood the controversy with the move to Ajax arch rivals, however expressed his delight with signing with the Eredivisie champions.

=== Greuther Fürth ===
Viergever moved to Bundesliga newcomers Greuther Fürth on 31 August 2021, the last day of the 2021 summer transfer window. He signed a two-year contract.

=== Utrecht ===
On 16 May 2022, Viergever signed a two-year contract with Utrecht.

=== PEC Zwolle ===
On 30 June 2026, Viergever joined PEC Zwolle for one season.

== International career ==
On 7 May 2012, Viergever was one of nine uncapped players named in the provisional list of 36 players for the Euro 2012 tournament by Netherlands manager Bert van Marwijk. He did not make the final cut. On 15 August 2012, Viergever made his debut under new manager Louis van Gaal in the 4–2 away loss to Belgium in a friendly match.

== Career statistics ==
=== Club ===
As of match played 21 May 2026

Appearances and goals by club, season and competition
Club	Season	League			Cup		Continental (Note: Includes UEFA Champions League and UEFA Europa League)		Other (Note: Includes Johan Cruyff Shield and Eredivisie playoffs)		Total	
Club	Season	Division	Apps	Goals	Apps	Goals	Apps	Goals	Apps	Goals	Apps	Goals
Sparta Rotterdam	2008–09	Eredivisie	1	0	0	0	—		—		1	0
Sparta Rotterdam	2009–10	Eredivisie	29	0	3	0	—		3	0	35	0
Sparta Rotterdam	Total		30	0	3	0	0	0	3	0	36	0
AZ	2010–11	Eredivisie	16	0	0	0	3 (Note: Appearances in UEFA Europa League)	0	—		19	0
AZ	2011–12	Eredivisie	30	2	5	1	14	0	—		49	3
AZ	2012–13	Eredivisie	31	0	6	0	2	0	—		39	0
AZ	2013–14	Eredivisie	33	3	5	0	13	2	—		51	5
AZ	Total		110	5	16	1	32	2	0	0	158	8
Ajax	2014–15	Eredivisie	26	2	3	0	9 (Note: Five appearances in UEFA Champions League, four appearances in UEFA Europa League)	1	1	0	39	3
Ajax	2015–16	Eredivisie	17	0	1	0	1	0	0	0	19	0
Ajax	2016–17	Eredivisie	29	2	1	0	13 (Note: Three appearances in UEFA Champions League, ten appearances in UEFA Europa League)	2	—		43	4
Ajax	2017–18	Eredivisie	12	2	2	0	4 (Note: Two appearances in UEFA Champions League, two appearances in UEFA Europa League)	0	—		18	2
Ajax	Total		84	6	7	0	27	3	1	0	119	9
PSV Eindhoven	2018–19	Eredivisie	34	3	0	0	8 (Note: Appearances in UEFA Champions League)	0	1	0	43	3
PSV Eindhoven	2019–20	Eredivisie	23	0	2	0	12 (Note: Two appearances in UEFA Champions League, ten appearances in UEFA Europa League)	0	0	0	37	0
PSV Eindhoven	2020–21	Eredivisie	17	0	1	0	4	0	—		22	0
PSV Eindhoven	2021–22	Eredivisie	1	0	0	0	1	0	0	0	2	0
PSV Eindhoven	Total		75	3	3	0	25	0	1	0	104	3
Greuther Fürth	2021–22	Bundesliga	24	0	0	0	—		—		24	0
Utrecht	2022–23	Eredivisie	19	2	2	1	—		2 (Note: Appearances in Eredivisie promotion/relegation playoffs)	1	23	4
Utrecht	2023–24	Eredivisie	25	1	1	0	—		2	1	28	2
Utrecht	2024–25	Eredivisie	33	3	4	0	—		—		37	3
Utrecht	2025–26	Eredivisie	25	0	1	0	13	2	1 (Note: Appearance in European play-offs)	0	40	2
Utrecht	Total		102	6	8	1	13	2	5	2	128	11
Career total			425	20	37	2	97	7	10	2	568	32

=== International ===
As of match played 31 May 2017

Appearances and goals by national team and year
National team	Year	Apps	Goals
Netherlands	2012	1	0
Netherlands	2017	2	0
Total		3	0

== Honours ==
AZ

- KNVB Cup: 2012–13

Ajax

- UEFA Europa League runner-up: 2016–17

PSV Eindhoven

- Johan Cruyff Shield: 2021

Individual

- Eredivisie Team of the Month: October 2024
