= Tim Gilissen =

Dutch footballer

Personal information
- Full name: Tim Gilissen
- Date of birth: June 4, 1982 (age 44)
- Place of birth: Enschede, Netherlands
- Position: Midfielder

Youth career
- Rigtersbleek
- Vogido
- SC Enschede
- Twente

Senior career*
Years	Team	Apps	(Gls)
2002–2005	Heracles	19	(1)
2005–2007	Go Ahead Eagles	71	(5)
2007–2014	NAC	144	(0)
Total		234	(6)
- * Club domestic league appearances and goals

Tim Gilissen (Dutch pronunciation: [ˈtɪm ˈɣilɪsə(n)]; born 4 June 1982) is a Dutch retired footballer who played as a midfielder. During his career his played for Heracles Almelo, Go Ahead Eagles and NAC Breda.

After retiring as a player, Gilissen was head of the NAC Academy alongside Eric Hellemons. From 2019 to 2022, Gilissen was TD at Heracles. He then became technical manager at FC Utrecht before joining FC Twente as a Strategic Manager.

== Honours ==
Heracles Almelo

- Eerste Divisie: 2004–05
