= Dennis Telgenkamp =

Dutch footballer

Personal information
- Date of birth: 9 May 1987 (age 39)
- Place of birth: Wierden, Netherlands
- Height: 1.92 m (6 ft 4 in)
- Position: Goalkeeper

Youth career
- SV Omhoog
- Twente

Senior career*
Years	Team	Apps	(Gls)
2008–2015	Heracles Almelo	23	(0)
2012–2013	→ Cambuur (loan)	26	(0)
2015–2021	Emmen	147	(0)
Total		196	(0)
- * Club domestic league appearances and goals

Dennis Telgenkamp (born 9 May 1987) is a Dutch former professional footballer who played as a goalkeeper. He played for Heracles Almelo, SC Cambuur and FC Emmen.
