= List of Eredivisie top scorers =

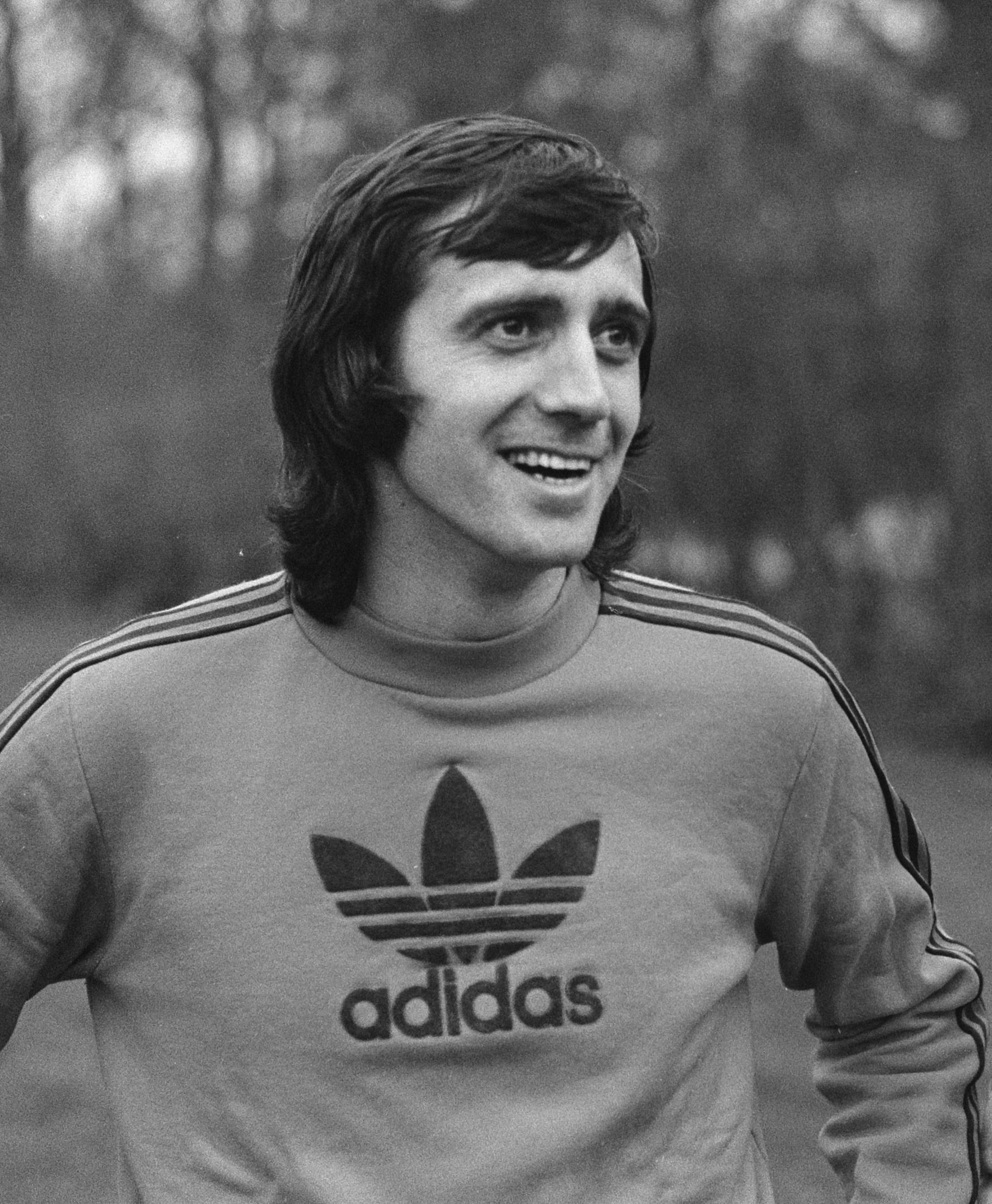
Willy van der Kuijlen has scored the most goals in Eredivisie history.

This is a list of players who scored over 100 goals in Eredivisie, Netherlands' top flight football league, during its history starting from the 1956 season.

== All-time top scorers ==
Key

- **Bold** shows players still playing in Eredivisie.
- Italics show players still playing professional football in other leagues.

As of matches played 1 June 2025

Rank	Player	Goals	Apps	Ratio	Topscorer	First	Last	Club(s) (goals/apps)	Notes
1	(Netherlands) Willy van der Kuijlen	311	544	0.57	3	1964	1982	PSV Eindhoven (308/528), MVV Maastricht (3/16)	
2	(Netherlands) Ruud Geels	265	393	0.67	5	1966	1983	Telstar (5/8), Feyenoord (46/89), Go Ahead Eagles (35/62), Ajax (123/132), Sparta Rotterdam (35/48), PSV Eindhoven (15/32), NAC Breda (6/22)	
3	(Netherlands) Johan Cruyff	215	308	0.7	3	1964	1984	Ajax (204/275), Feyenoord (11/33)	
4	(Netherlands) Kees Kist	212	372	0.57	2	1972	1985	AZ Alkmaar	
5	(Netherlands) Tonny van der Linden	208	324	0.64	0	1956	1967	Utrecht	
6	(Netherlands) Henk Groot	196	283	0.69	2	1959	1969	Ajax (164/229), Feyenoord (34/54)	
7	(Netherlands) Luuk de Jong	192	337	0.57	2	2008	2025	De Graafschap (2/14), Twente (39/75), PSV Eindhoven (151/248)	
8	(Netherlands) Peter Houtman	180	339	0.53	1	1978	1992	Feyenoord (84/132), Groningen (62/116), Sparta Rotterdam (32/76), Den Haag (2/15)	
9	(Netherlands) Sjaak Swart	175	463	0.38	0	1956	1973	Ajax	
10	(Netherlands) Leo van Veen	174	491	0.35	0	1965	1984	Utrecht (174/468), Ajax (0/23)	
11	(Netherlands) Cor van der Gijp	162	212	0.76	0	1956	1963	Feyenoord	
12	(Netherlands) Wim Kieft	158	266	0.59	2	1980	1994	Ajax (68/96), PSV Eindhoven (90/170)	
13	(Netherlands) Klaas-Jan Huntelaar	154	233	0.66	2	2002	2021	PSV Eindhoven (0/1), De Graafschap (0/9), Heerenveen (33/46), Ajax (121/177)	
14	(Netherlands) Dirk Kuyt	153	324	0.47	1	1998	2017	Utrecht (51/160), Feyenoord (102/164)	
15	(Netherlands) Henk Bosveld	152	362	0.42	0	1961	1979	Enschede (43/84), Sparta Rotterdam (94/222), Vitesse (15/56)	
15	(Norway) Hallvar Thoresen	152	314	0.48	0	1976	1987	Twente (46/135), PSV Eindhoven (106/179)	
17	(Netherlands) John Bosman	146	304	0.48	0	1983	2002	Ajax (77/125), PSV Eindhoven (11/30), Twente (34/87), AZ Alkmaar (24/62)	
17	(Netherlands) Willy Brokamp	146	352	0.41	1	1964	1976	MVV Maastricht (123/297), Ajax (23/55)	
17	(Netherlands) Piet Keizer	146	364	0.4	0	1961	1974	Ajax	
20	(Netherlands) Lex Schoenmaker	144	396	0.36	0	1966	1982	ADO Den Haag (96/292), Feyenoord (48/104)	
21	(Netherlands) Cees van Kooten	134	385	0.35	0	1972	1984	Telstar (45/138), Go Ahead Eagles (79/198), PEC Zwolle (11/49)	
21	(Netherlands) Jan Vennegoor of Hesselink	134	316	0.42	0	1996	2012	Twente (59/142), PSV Eindhoven (75/174)	
23	(Netherlands) Piet Kruiver	133	236	0.56	1	1957	1968	PSV Eindhoven (36/90), Feyenoord (74/94), DWS (23/52)	
24	(Sweden) Ove Kindvall	129	144	0.9	3	1966	1971	Feyenoord	
25	(Netherlands) Marco van Basten	128	133	0.96	4	1982	1987	Ajax	
26	(Netherlands) Martin van Geel	127	403	0.32	0	1979	1995	Ajax (9/22), Roda JC (53/198), Feyenoord (24/50), Willem II (41/133)	
27	(Netherlands) Theo de Jong	126	373	0.34	0	1970	1984	NEC Nijmegen (20/57), Feyenoord (61/163), Roda JC (41/125), Den Bosch (4/28)	
27	(Netherlands) Piet Keur	126	300	0.42	0	1981	1995	Haarlem (66/165), Twente (33/60), Feyenoord (15/42), SV SVV (4/15), Heerenveen (8/18)	
27	(Netherlands) Ronald Koeman	126	342	0.37	0	1980	1997	Groningen (33/89), Ajax (23/94), PSV Eindhoven (51/98), Feyenoord (19/61)	
27	(Netherlands) Willem van Hanegem	126	494	0.26	0	1966	1983	Xerxes (32/67), Feyenoord (81/298), AZ Alkmaar (10/75), Utrecht (3/54)	
31	(Netherlands) Pierre van Hooijdonk	125	191	0.65	1	1993	2007	Vitesse (25/29), NAC Breda (40/64), Feyenoord (60/98)	
32	(Netherlands) Gerald Vanenburg	124	381	0.33	0	1980	1997	Ajax (64/173), PSV Eindhoven (58/199), Utrecht (2/9)	
33	(Netherlands) Klaas Nuninga	121	328	0.37	0	1961	1972	Groningen (37/87), Ajax (76/152), DWS (8/89)	
34	(Netherlands) Coen Dillen	120	133	0.91	1	1956	1961	PSV Eindhoven	
35	(Serbia) Dušan Tadić	119	295	0.4	1	2010	2023	Groningen (14/68), Twente (28/66), Ajax (77/161)	
35	(Netherlands) René van de Kerkhof	119	377	0.32	0	1970	1983	Twente (34/99), PSV Eindhoven (85/278)	
37	(Netherlands) Dick Nanninga	118	261	0.45	0	1974	1986	Roda JC (107/226), MVV Maastricht (11/35)	
38	(Ghana) Matthew Amoah	117	310	0.38	0	1998	2014	Vitesse (62/174), Fortuna Sittard (10/15), NAC Breda (43/105), Heracles Almelo (2/16)	
39	(Netherlands) **Steven Berghuis**	116	351	0.33	0	2010	2025	Twente (1/8), VVV-Venlo (2/16), AZ Alkmaar (19/70), Feyenoord (70/149), **Ajax** (24/108)	
40	(Netherlands) Leo Canjels	114	148	0.77	2	1956	1963	NAC Breda	
40	(Switzerland) Blaise N'Kufo	114	223	0.51	0	2003	2010	Twente	
42	(Netherlands) Henk Wery	113	367	0.31	0	1963	1976	DWS (2/15), Utrecht (62/179), Feyenoord (49/173)	
43	(Denmark) Jon Dahl Tomasson	112	237	0.47	0	1994	2010	Heerenveen (37/78), Feyenoord (75/159)	
43	(Netherlands) **Bryan Linssen**	112	356	0.31	0	2010	2025	VVV-Venlo (12/70), Heracles Almelo (21/64), Groningen (13/55), Vitesse (41/88), Feyenoord (21/63), **NEC Nijmegen** (4/16)	
45	(Netherlands) Henny Meijer	111	328	0.34	0	1984	1996	Volendam (9/33), Roda JC (27/65), Ajax (11/26), Groningen (49/146), Cambuur (8/25), Heerenveen (2/13), De Graafschap (5/20)	
46	(Belgium) Luc Nilis	110	164	0.67	2	1994	2000	PSV Eindhoven	
47	(Netherlands) Dick van Dijk	109	149	0.73	1	1967	1972	Twente (52/65), Ajax (57/84)	
47	(Netherlands) Jacques Visschers	109	251	0.43	0	1959	1971	NAC Breda	
49	(Netherlands) André Hoekstra	106	317	0.33	0	1981	1994	Feyenoord (66/181), RKC Waalwijk (40/136)	
50	(Serbia) Mateja Kežman	105	122	0.86	3	2000	2004	PSV Eindhoven	
50	(Netherlands) Carol Schuurman	105	166	0.63	0	1957	1963	ADO Den Haag	
50	(Netherlands) Frans Rutten	105	213	0.49	0	1956	1964	MVV Maastricht (71/149), Roda JC (25/29), Fortuna Sittard (9/35)	
50	(Denmark) Kenneth Pérez	105	325	0.32	0	1997	2010	MVV Maastricht (16/47), AZ Alkmaar (51/164), PSV Eindhoven (8/14), Ajax (19/43), Twente (11/57)	
54	(Luxembourg) Spitz Kohn	104	190	0.55	0	1959	1968	Enschede (12/18), Fortuna Sittard (81/143), Twente (11/29)	
54	(Netherlands) John van Loen	104	313	0.33	0	1983	1998	Roda JC (25/56), Ajax (11/37), Feyenoord (17/54), Utrecht (51/166)	
56	(Denmark) John Eriksen	103	175	0.59	0	1979	1986	Roda JC (81/144), Feyenoord (22/31)	
56	(Netherlands) Chris Coenen	103	342	0.3	0	1956	1969	MVV Maastricht (84/237), Fortuna Sittard (19/105),	
58	(Netherlands) Dennis Bergkamp	102	186	0.55	3	1986	1993	Ajax	
58	(Netherlands) Hans Gillhaus	102	237	0.43	0	1983	1997	Den Bosch (45/105), PSV Eindhoven (23/67), Vitesse (33/54), AZ Alkmaar (1/11)	
58	(Netherlands) Ronald Lengkeek	102	240	0.43	0	1979	1989	Sparta Rotterdam	
58	(Netherlands) Harry Lubse	102	320	0.32	0	1969	1984	PSV Eindhoven (83/254), Helmond Sport (19/66)	
62	(Netherlands) Jan Jeuring	101	326	0.31	0	1966	1977	Twente	
63	(Netherlands) Rick Hoogendorp	100	241	0.41	0	1998	2009	RKC Waalwijk (95/218), ADO Den Haag (5/23)	
63	(Netherlands) Arnold Bruggink	100	310	0.32	0	1993	2011	Twente (34/105), PSV Eindhoven (59/152), Heerenveen (7/53)	

== See also ==
- List of Eredivisie hat-tricks
