= 2009–10 FC Twente season =

FC Twente
2009–10 season
- Manager: Steve McClaren
- Stadium: De Grolsch Veste
- Eredivisie: 1st
- KNVB Cup: Semi-finals
- UEFA Champions League: Third qualifying round
- UEFA Europa League: Round of 32
- Top goalscorer: League: Bryan Ruiz (24); All: Bryan Ruiz (28)

During the 2009–10 Dutch football season, FC Twente competed in the Eredivisie.

== Season summary ==
Twente won their first ever Eredivise title. Manager Steve McClaren departed for Bundesliga club VfL Wolfsburg and was replaced by Gent manager Michel Preud'homme.

== Competitions ==
=== Eredivisie ===
==== League table ====
Pos	Team	Pld	W	D	L	GF	GA	GD	Pts	Qualification or relegation
1	Twente (C)	34	27	5	2	63	23	+40	86	Qualification to Champions League group stage
2	Ajax	34	27	4	3	106	20	+86	85	Qualification to Champions League third qualifying round
3	PSV	34	23	9	2	72	29	+43	78	Qualification to Europa League play-off round
4	Feyenoord	34	17	12	5	54	31	+23	63	Qualification to Europa League play-off round
5	AZ	34	19	5	10	64	34	+30	62	Qualification to Europa League third qualifying round

Source: eredivsie.nl (in Dutch)
Rules for classification: 1) points; 2) goal difference; 3) number of goals scored.
(C) Champions

=== UEFA Europa League ===
==== Group stage ====
Pos	Team	Pld	W	D	L	GF	GA	GD	Pts	Qualification
1	(Turkey) Fenerbahçe	6	5	0	1	8	3	+5	15	Advance to knockout phase
2	(Netherlands) Twente	6	2	2	2	5	6	−1	8	Advance to knockout phase
3	(Moldova) Sheriff Tiraspol	6	1	2	3	4	5	−1	5	
4	(Romania) Steaua București	6	0	4	2	3	6	−3	4	

== Kit ==
Twente's kit was manufactured by Italian brand Diadora and sponsored by Arke.

== First-team squad ==
Squad at end of season

Note: Flags indicate national team as defined under FIFA eligibility rules; some limited exceptions apply. Players may hold more than one non-FIFA nationality.

No.	Pos.	Nation	Player
1	GK	NED	Sander Boschker
2	DF	AUS	David Carney
3	DF	NED	Nicky Kuiper
4	DF	NED	Peter Wisgerhof
5	DF	SRB	Slobodan Rajković (on loan from Chelsea)
6	MF	NED	Wout Brama (captain)
7	FW	AZE	Vagif Javadov
8	DF	NED	Ronnie Stam
9	FW	SUI	Blaise Nkufo (Note: Nkufo was born in Kinshasa, Zaire (now Democratic Republic of the Congo), but also qualified to represent Switzerland internationally and made his international debut for Switzerland in 2000.)
10	FW	DEN	Kenneth Perez
13	GK	BUL	Nikolay Mihaylov (on loan from Liverpool)
14	MF	RSA	Bernard Parker
15	FW	SVK	Miroslav Stoch (on loan from Chelsea)
16	GK	NED	Cees Paauwe

No.	Pos.	Nation	Player
17	FW	BRA	Wellington (on loan from 1899 Hoffenheim)
18	MF	CIV	Cheick Tioté
19	DF	BRA	Douglas
20	FW	NED	Luuk de Jong (Note: de Jong was born in Aigle, Switzerland, but also qualified to represent the Netherlands internationally and represented the Netherlands at U-19 and U-21 level before making his international debut for the Netherlands in February 2011.)
22	MF	CRC	Bryan Ruiz
23	MF	IRQ	Nashat Akram
24	MF	NED	Theo Janssen
25	FW	SVK	Andrej Rendla
26	DF	NED	Dwight Tiendalli (Note: Tiendalli was born in Paramaribo, Suriname, but was raised in the Netherlands and represented the Netherlands at U-21 level before making his international debut for the Netherlands in June 2013.)
27	MF	CRO	Dario Vujičević (Note: Vujičević was born in Sarajevo, SFR Yugoslavia (now Bosnia and Herzegovina), but also qualified to represent Croatia internationally and represented Croatia at U-21 level.)
28	FW	GHA	Ransford Osei (on loan from Maccabi Haifa)
33	MF	NED	Alexander Bannink
34	MF	GER	Thilo Leugers
36	DF	AUT	Michael Schimpelsberger

=== Left club during season ===
Note: Flags indicate national team as defined under FIFA eligibility rules; some limited exceptions apply. Players may hold more than one non-FIFA nationality.

No.	Pos.	Nation	Player
7	FW	NED	Romano Denneboom (on loan to Sparta Rotterdam)
11	FW	AUS	Nikita Rukavytsya (on loan to Roeselare)
12	DF	NED	Jeroen Heubach (on loan to NEC)
17	MF	NED	Youssouf Hersi (Note: Hersi was born in Dire Dawa, Ethiopia, but also qualified to represent the Netherlands internationally and represented the Netherlands at U-21 level.) (to AEK Athens)
21	FW	AUT	Marko Arnautović (on loan to Inter)

No.	Pos.	Nation	Player
26	MF	ISL	Bjarni Viðarsson (to Roeselare)
29	MF	FIN	Përparim Hetemaj (Note: Hetemaj was born in Srbica, SFR Yugoslavia (now Skenderaj, Kosovo), but was raised in Finland from the age of 5 and represented Finland at U-19 and U-21 level before making his international debut for Finland in February 2009.) (to Brescia)
31	FW	NED	Lesley Nahrwold (on loan to RBC Roosendaal)
66	DF	CZE	Martin Sus (to 1. FC Brno)

=== Reserves ===
Note: Flags indicate national team as defined under FIFA eligibility rules; some limited exceptions apply. Players may hold more than one non-FIFA nationality.

No.	Pos.	Nation	Player
32	FW	NOR	Flamur Kastrati (Note: Kastrati was born in Oslo, Norway, and represented Norway at U-18, U-19, and U-21 level, but also qualified to represent Albania and Kosovo internationally and made his international debut for Kosovo in 2014.)
35	DF	GER	Sebastian Sumelka
37	DF	NED	Mitch Stockentree
38	MF	GER	Theo Vogelsang (Note: Vogelsang was born in Omsk, Soviet Union (now Russia), but also holds German citizenship.)
39	DF	FIN	Petteri Pennanen
40	DF	POL	Bartek Pacuszka
42	DF	FIN	Tuomas Rannankari
43	DF	GER	Stefan Thesker
44	GK	NED	Nick Hengelman
45	GK	NED	Nick Marsman
46	DF	NED	Sander van Aken

No.	Pos.	Nation	Player
47	DF	NED	Thijs Bouma
48	DF	GER	Nils Röseler
49	FW	SVK	Filip Oršula
50	FW	NED	Ruud Bruns
52	DF	NED	Leon van Dijk
53	FW	ANG	Hermani de Andrade
54	FW	NED	Steven Berghuis
55	MF	AFG	Faysal Shayesteh
57	FW	NED	Ola John (Note: John was born in Zwedru, Liberia, but was raised in the Netherlands from the age of 2 and represented the Netherlands at U-17, U-19 and U-21 level before making his international debut for the Netherlands in 2013.)
62	MF	GER	Marcel Piesche
69	FW	NED	Ninos Gouriye
