= List of Eredivisie hat-tricks =

The following is a list of Eredivisie hat-tricks for Eredivisie, the highest level of professional football in the Netherlands.

== List ==
Key
^{4}	Player scored four goals
^{5}	Player scored five goals
†	Player scored hat-trick as a substitute
^{P}	Player scored a perfect hat-trick

Rnd	Player	Club	Goals	Date	Home	Score	Away
2	(Belgium) Zakaria Bakkali	PSV Eindhoven	6' 47' 82'	10 August 2013	PSV Eindhoven	5–0	NEC
4	(Italy) Graziano Pellè	Feyenoord	37' 38' 53'	25 August 2013	Feyenoord	3–1	NAC Breda
5	(Netherlands) Erik Falkenburg	Go Ahead Eagles	9' 19' 64'	31 August 2013	RKC Waalwijk	1–4	Go Ahead Eagles
8	(Germany) Mark Uth	Heracles Almelo	10' 53' 79'	28 September 2013	RKC Waalwijk	1–4	Heracles Almelo
8	(Italy) Graziano Pellè	Feyenoord	7' 54' 63' (pen.)	29 September 2013	Feyenoord	4–1	ADO Den Haag
13	(Iceland) Alfreð Finnbogason	Heerenveen	48' (pen.) 64' 79' (pen.)	8 November 2013	Heerenveen	5–2	RKC Waalwijk
16	(Netherlands) Davy Klaassen	Ajax	34' 45+1' 64'	7 December 2013	Ajax	4–0	NAC Breda
18	(Netherlands) Michael de Leeuw	Groningen	14' 49' 70'	22 December 2013	Groningen	5–2	NEC Nijmegen
28	(Denmark) Lasse Schöne	Ajax	12' (pen.) 18' (pen.) 82'	16 February 2014	Ajax	3–0	Heerenveen
4	(Germany) Mark Uth	Heerenveen	3' 54' 90+4'	30 August 2014	Heerenveen	3–1	Utrecht
7	(Georgia (country)) Valeri Qazaishvili	Vitesse	55' 65' 90+3'	27 September 2014	Dordrecht	2–6	Vitesse
7	(Iceland) Kolbeinn Sigþórsson	Ajax	29' 38' 89'	27 September 2014	NAC Breda	2–5	Ajax
8	(Netherlands) Marko Vejinović	Vitesse	37' 40' (pen.) 62' (pen.)	3 October 2014	Vitesse	6–1	ADO Den Haag
14	(Netherlands) Luuk de Jong	PSV Eindhoven	22' 60' 63'	17 December 2014	PSV Eindhoven	4–3	Feyenoord
23	(Netherlands) Luuk de Jong	PSV Eindhoven	3' 8' 60'	13 February 2015	AZ	2–4	PSV Eindhoven
23	(France) Sébastien Haller^{4}	Utrecht	16' 39' 49' (pen.) 81'	15 February 2015	Utrecht	6–1	Dordrecht
26	(Netherlands) Stef Nijland†	PEC Zwolle	71' (pen.) 80' 89'	7 March 2015	PEC Zwolle	6–1	SC Cambuur
34	(Netherlands) Michael de Leeuw	FC Groningen	11' 24' 31'	17 May 2015	NAC Breda	4–5	FC Groningen
3	(Morocco) Oussama Tannane^{4}	Heracles Almelo	7' 21' (pen.) 29' 41'	22 August 2015	Cambuur	1–6	Heracles Almelo
5	(Netherlands) Luuk de Jong^{P}	PSV Eindhoven	9' (pen.) 12' 42'	12 September 2015	Cambuur	0–6	PSV Eindhoven
5	(Netherlands) Lars Veldwijk	PEC Zwolle	13' 25' 57'	12 September 2015	PEC Zwolle	3–0	Excelsior
9	(Netherlands) Dirk Kuyt	Feyenoord	7' 32' 39'	18 October 2015	Heerenveen	2–5	Feyenoord
10	(Netherlands) Dirk Kuyt	Feyenoord	13' 59' 77' (pen.)	25 October 2015	Feyenoord	3–1	AZ
14	(Netherlands) Michiel Kramer	Feyenoord	36' 55' 71'	28 November 2015	Excelsior	2–4	Feyenoord
14	(Denmark) Lucas Andersen	Willem II	16' 21' 45+2'	28 November 2015	Twente	1–3	Willem II
19	(Netherlands) Vincent Janssen	AZ	26' 53' 55'	24 January 2016	AZ	4–2	Feyenoord
31	(Netherlands) Vincent Janssen^{4}	AZ	20' (pen.) 25' 69' (pen.) 83'	16 April 2016	AZ	5–1	PEC Zwolle
1	(Netherlands) Eljero Elia	Feyenoord	36' 45' 56'	7 August 2016	Groningen	0–5	Feyenoord
3	(Turkey) Enes Ünal	Twente	23' 36' 39'	21 August 2016	Groningen	3–4	Twente
19	(Denmark) Kasper Dolberg	Ajax	19' 24' 37'	20 November 2016	Ajax	5–0	NEC
19	(Iran) Reza Ghoochannejhad	Heerenveen	5' 54' 80'	22 January 2017	PSV Eindhoven	4–3	Heerenveen
26	(Denmark) Nicolai Jørgensen	Feyenoord	11' 80' (pen.) 82'	14 March 2017	Feyenoord	5–2	AZ
29	(Netherlands) Jens Toornstra	Feyenoord	9' 41' 90'	5 April 2017	Feyenoord	8–0	Go Ahead Eagles
30	(Netherlands) Ricky van Wolfswinkel^{P}	Vitesse	14' 70' 75'	8 April 2017	Vitesse	4–2	Heerenveen
34	(Netherlands) Dirk Kuyt	Feyenoord	1' 12' 84' (pen.)	14 May 2017	Feyenoord	3–1	Heracles Almelo
6	(Netherlands) Jürgen Locadia^{4}	PSV Eindhoven	15' 49' 68' 85' (pen.)	24 September 2017	Utrecht	1–7	PSV Eindhoven
12	(Netherlands) Donny van de Beek	Ajax	18' 27' 75'	18 November 2017	NAC Breda	0–8	Ajax
13	(Nigeria) Bartholomew Ogbeche^{P}	Willem II	62' 74' 90+2'	25 November 2017	VVV-Venlo	3–3	Willem II
13	(Netherlands) Justin Kluivert	Ajax	45' 60' 85'	26 November 2017	Ajax	5–1	Roda JC Kerkrade
18	(Germany) Lennart Thy	VVV-Venlo	17' 54' 76'	24 December 2017	VVV-Venlo	3–1	Heracles Almelo
21	(Netherlands) Luuk de Jong	PSV Eindhoven	45+3' 65' 72'	3 February 2018	PSV Eindhoven	4–0	PEC Zwolle
27	(Spain) Fran Sol	Willem II	59' 70' (pen.) 90' (pen.)	10 March 2018	Willem II	5–0	PSV Eindhoven
32	(Iran) Alireza Jahanbakhsh	AZ	12' 45+2' 53'	18 April 2018	AZ	4–3	Vitesse
34	(Iran) Alireza Jahanbakhsh	AZ	13' 52' 88'	6 May 2018	AZ	6–0	PEC Zwolle
3	(Spain) Fran Sol	Willem II	34' 52' (pen.) 70'	26 August 2018	Willem II	5–0	Heracles Almelo
4	(Netherlands) Abdenasser El Khayati^{4}	ADO Den Haag	21' (pen.) 45+1' 65' 69'	1 September 2018	Excelsior	2–4	ADO Den Haag
16	(Netherlands) Daley Blind	Ajax	65' 74' 90'	16 December 2018	Ajax	8–0	De Graafschap
16	(Morocco) Hakim Ziyech	Ajax	32' 62' 69'	16 December 2018	Ajax	8–0	De Graafschap
18	(Netherlands) Fabian Serrarens	De Graafschap	27' 30' 66'	20 January 2019	De Graafschap	5–1	Fortuna Sittard
20	(Netherlands) Luuk de Jong	PSV Eindhoven	54' 76' 87'	3 February 2019	PSV Eindhoven	5–0	Fortuna Sittard
22	(Spain) Adrián Dalmau^{4}	Heracles Almelo	1' 51' 60' 78'	16 February 2019	Heracles Almelo	6–0	Fortuna Sittard
24	(Netherlands) Robin van Persie	Feyenoord	38' 52' 62'	3 March 2019	Feyenoord	4–0	Emmen
27	(Sweden) Alexander Isak	Willem II	44' (pen.) 58' (pen.) 61' (pen.)	30 March 2019	Willem II	3–2	Fortuna Sittard
27	(Netherlands) Thomas Buitink	Vitesse	21' 27' 43'	30 March 2019	ADO Den Haag	3–3	Vitesse
30	(Netherlands) Klaas-Jan Huntelaar	Ajax	10' 40' 65'	13 April 2019	Ajax	6–2	Excelsior
31	(Netherlands) Bryan Linssen	Vitesse	9' 47' 77'	20 April 2019	Vitesse	4–1	PEC Zwolle
33	(Spain) Adrián Dalmau	Heracles Almelo	23' 51' 59'	12 May 2019	Heracles Almelo	4–5	Excelsior
33	(Iceland) Elías Már Ómarsson	Excelsior	4' 45' 90+1'	12 May 2019	Heracles Almelo	4–5	Excelsior
33	(Togo) Peniel Mlapa	VVV-Venlo	54' 57' 75'	12 May 2019	PEC Zwolle	2–4	VVV-Venlo
4	(Netherlands) Quincy Promes	Ajax	50' 68' 83'	25 September 2019	Ajax	5–0	Fortuna Sittard
6	(Netherlands) Donyell Malen^{5}	PSV Eindhoven	18' 36' 46' 83' (pen.) 89' (pen.)	14 September 2019	PSV Eindhoven	5–0	Vitesse
6	(Iran) Reza Ghoochannejhad^{4}†	PEC Zwolle	60' 81' 83' 88'	15 September 2019	PEC Zwolle	6–2	RKC Waalwijk
11	(Netherlands) Mark Diemers	Fortuna Sittard	9' 26' 87' (pen.)	26 October 2019	Fortuna Sittard	4–1	VVV-Venlo
13	(Nigeria) Cyriel Dessers	Heracles Almelo	56' 64' 82'	9 November 2019	Heracles Almelo	6–1	VVV-Venlo
15	(Netherlands) Noa Lang	Ajax	32' 51' 70'	1 December 2019	Twente	2–5	Ajax
17	(Netherlands) Steven Berghuis	Feyenoord	19' 34' (pen.) 64' (pen.)	15 December 2019	Feyenoord	3–1	PSV Eindhoven
1	(Greece) Giorgos Giakoumakis	VVV-Venlo	50' 65' (pen.) 72'	13 September 2020	Emmen	3–5	VVV-Venlo
6	(Burkina Faso) Lassina Traoré^{5}	Ajax	17' 32' 54' 65' 87'	24 October 2020	VVV-Venlo	0–13	Ajax
7	(Netherlands) Rai Vloet	Heracles Almelo	2' 63' 71'	1 November 2020	Heracles Almelo	4–1	Utrecht
14	(Netherlands) Bryan Linssen	Feyenoord	48' 58' 90+1'	23 December 2020	Feyenoord	3–0	Heerenveen
16	(Greece) Giorgos Giakoumakis^{4}	VVV-Venlo	6' (pen.) 58' 68' 86' (pen.)	13 January 2021	ADO Den Haag	1–4	VVV-Venlo
16	(Turkey) Sinan Bakış	Heracles Almelo	26' 44' 64'	12 January 2021	Heracles Almelo	4–0	Emmen
18	(Iran) Reza Ghoochannejhad†	PEC Zwolle	58' 62' 70' (pen.)	22 January 2021	Willem II	1–3	PEC Zwolle
19	(Greece) Giorgos Giakoumakis^{4}	VVV-Venlo	16' 28' 43' 79'	27 January 2021	VVV-Venlo	4–1	Vitesse
24	(Netherlands) Myron Boadu	AZ	22' 41' 64'	28 January 2021	AZ	4–2	Feyenoord
30	(Netherlands) Michael de Leeuw	Emmen	58' (pen.) 89' 90+1'	25 April 2021	Emmen	3–1	Heracles Almelo
31	(Turkey) Sinan Bakış	Heracles Almelo	35' 55' 83' (pen.)	1 May 2021	Heracles Almelo	4–0	VVV-Venlo
11	(Netherlands) Bart Ramselaar	Utrecht	10' 25' 67'	31 October 2021	Utrecht	5–1	Willem II
22	(Ivory Coast) Sébastien Haller	Ajax	53' 85' 88'	13 February 2022	Ajax	5–0	Twente
2	(Netherlands) Steven Bergwijn	Ajax	4' 45' 57'	14 August 2022	Ajax	6–1	Groningen
3	(Netherlands) Sydney van Hooijdonk	Heerenveen	5' 72' 77'	20 August 2022	Vitesse	0–4	Heerenveen
3	(Netherlands) Cody Gakpo	PSV Eindhoven	25' (pen.) 39' 51'	31 August 2022	PSV Eindhoven	7–1	Volendam
5	(Greece) Anastasios Douvikas†	Utrecht	71' (pen.) 77' 86'	2 September 2022	Fortuna Sittard	3–4	Utrecht
19	(Greece) Anastasios Douvikas	Utrecht	12' 16' 65'	28 January 2023	AZ	5–5	Utrecht
19	(Greece) Vangelis Pavlidis	AZ	31' 34' 78'	28 January 2023	AZ	5–5	Utrecht
30	(Netherlands) Ole Romeny^{P}	Emmen	47' 75' 90+2'	22 April 2023	Heerenveen	2–3	Emmen
33	(Netherlands) Million Manhoef	Vitesse	4' 56' 74'	21 May 2023	Vitesse	6–0	Groningen
6	(Mexico) Santiago Giménez	Feyenoord	9' 18' 59'	27 September 2023	Ajax	0–4	Feyenoord
9	(Greece) Vangelis Pavlidis	AZ	11' 59' 76'	21 October 2023	AZ	3–0	Heerenveen
10	(Mexico) Hirving Lozano	PSV Eindhoven	20' 60' 72'	29 October 2023	PSV Eindhoven	5–2	Ajax
13	(Mexico) Santiago Giménez	Feyenoord	6' 61' 82'	25 November 2023	Excelsior	2–4	Feyenoord
13	(Netherlands) Mohamed Sankoh	Heracles Almelo	4' 64' 87'	26 November 2023	Almere City	0–5	Heracles Almelo
14	(Netherlands) Ferdy Druijf†	PEC Zwolle	62' 67' 87'	2 December 2023	Volendam	0–5	PEC Zwolle
17	(Netherlands) Luuk de Jong	PSV Eindhoven	13' 17' 69'	13 January 2024	PSV Eindhoven	3–1	Excelsior
20	(United States) Taylor Booth	Utrecht	38' 57' 84'	4 February 2024	Utrecht	4–2	Volendam
23	(Netherlands) Luuk de Jong	PSV Eindhoven	32' 51' 71'	24 February 2024	PEC Zwolle	1–7	PSV Eindhoven
24	(Netherlands) Kaj Sierhuis	Fortuna Sittard	15' 29' 34'	3 March 2024	Fortuna Sittard	5–2	Excelsior
32	(Netherlands) David Min	RKC Waalwijk	7' 67' 82'	5 May 2024	Heracles Almelo	0–5	RKC Waalwijk
33	(Netherlands) Steven Bergwijn	Ajax	29' 34' 38'	12 May 2024	Ajax	3–0	Almere City
33	(Netherlands) Sem Steijn	Twente	43' 69' 73'	12 May 2024	Twente	7–2	Volendam
5	(Republic of Ireland) Troy Parrott^{4}	AZ	23' 48' 50' 56'	14 September 2024	AZ	9–1	Heerenveen
13	(United States) Ricardo Pepi	PSV Eindhoven	37' 64' 78'	23 November 2024	PSV Eindhoven	5–0	Groningen
15	(Norway) Oliver Edvardsen	Go Ahead Eagles	5' 6' 25'	7 December 2024	Go Ahead Eagles	5–0	NEC
16	(Mexico) Santiago Giménez	Feyenoord	31' 36' (pen.) 45+3'	14 December 2024	Feyenoord	5–2	Heracles Almelo
18	(Denmark) Jakob Breum	Go Ahead Eagles	27' 47' 87'	10 January 2025	Fortuna Sittard	0–3	Go Ahead Eagles
18	(Netherlands) Sem Steijn	Twente	12' 36' 50' (pen.)	12 January 2025	Twente	6–2	Willem II
26	(Brazil) Igor Paixão	Feyenoord	14' 53' 62'	16 March 2025	Twente	2–6	Feyenoord
31	(Croatia) Ivan Perišić	PSV Eindhoven	15' 40' 73'	3 May 2025	PSV Eindhoven	4–1	Fortuna Sittard
9	(Japan) Ayase Ueda	Feyenoord	7' 33' 38'	19 October 2025	Heracles Almelo	0–7	Feyenoord
10	(Morocco) Ismael Saibari	PSV Eindhoven	30' 51' 60'	26 October 2025	Feyenoord	2–3	PSV Eindhoven
11	(Netherlands) Jizz Hornkamp	Heracles Almelo	18' 29' 32'	2 November 2025	Heracles Almelo	8–2	PEC Zwolle
12	(Netherlands) Guus Til	PSV Eindhoven	11' 28' 89'	9 November 2025	AZ	1–5	PSV Eindhoven
15	(Japan) Ayase Ueda^{4}	Feyenoord	11' 20' 42' 55'	6 December 2025	Feyenoord	6–1	PEC Zwolle
27	(Denmark) Jakob Breum	Go Ahead Eagles	45' 73' 76'	15 March 2026	Go Ahead Eagles	6–0	NAC Breda
6	(Spain) Nacho Ferri	Feyenoord	18' 23' 49'	13 September 2026	PEC Zwolle	0–7	Feyenoord
6	(Netherlands) Sven Mijnans^{P}	PSV Eindhoven	23' 74' 88'	13 September 2026	PSV Eindhoven	4–1	Sparta Rotterdam
11	(Netherlands) Wout Weghorst^{4} ^{P}	Twente	12' 32' 33' 62' (pen.)	1 November 2026	Excelsior	0–9	Twente
12	(Netherlands) Ringo Meerveld	Heerenveen	61' 84' 90+3'	8 November 2026	Heerenveen	5–3	Feyenoord
12	(Netherlands) Sven Mijnans	PSV Eindhoven	1' 15' 80'	8 November 2026	Cambuur	2–5	PSV Eindhoven
