= Luuk de Jong =

Dutch footballer (born 1990)

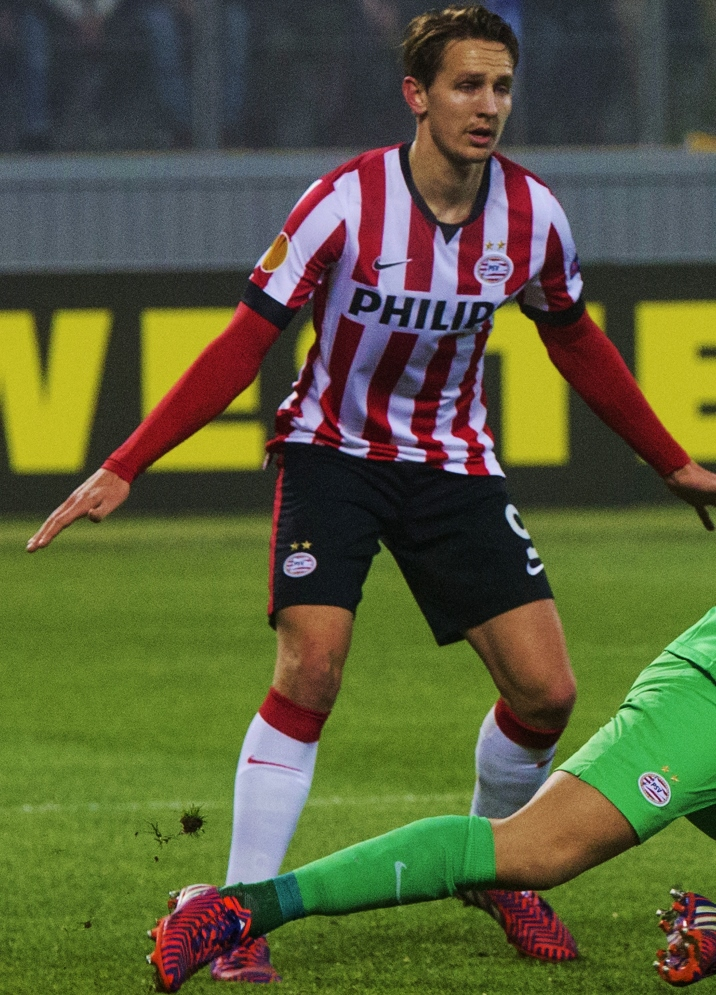
- De Jong playing for PSV in 2014

Personal information
- Full name: Luuk de Jong
- Date of birth: 27 August 1990 (age 36)
- Place of birth: Aigle, Switzerland
- Height: 1.88 m (6 ft 2 in)
- Position: Striker

Youth career
- DZC '68
- 2001–2008: De Graafschap

Senior career*
Years	Team	Apps	(Gls)
2008–2009	De Graafschap	14	(2)
2009–2012	Twente	75	(39)
2012–2014	Borussia Mönchengladbach	36	(6)
2014	→ Newcastle United (loan)	12	(0)
2014–2019	PSV	159	(94)
2019–2022	Sevilla	69	(10)
2021–2022	→ Barcelona (loan)	21	(6)
2022–2025	PSV	89	(57)
2025–2026	Porto	5	(1)

International career
2008–2009	Netherlands U19	5	(1)
2009–2013	Netherlands U21	18	(5)
2011–2022	Netherlands	39	(8)
Medal record
Men's football
Representing Netherlands
UEFA Nations League
Runner-up	2019 Portugal
- * Club domestic league appearances and goals as of 12:55, 23 May 2026 (UTC)

Luuk de Jong (Dutch pronunciation: [ˈlyɡ də ˈjɔŋ]; born 27 August 1990) is a professional footballer who plays as a striker. Born in Switzerland, he played for the Netherlands national team.

De Jong previously played for DZC '68, De Graafschap, Twente, Borussia Mönchengladbach, and Newcastle United, before joining PSV Eindhoven in 2014. He played over 200 games for the club, scoring over 100 goals, and helped them win the Eredivisie three times in his five-season stay. In 2019, he joined Sevilla, before going out on loan to Barcelona in 2021. He re-joined PSV in 2022.

A former Dutch international, De Jong represented the Netherlands at UEFA Euro 2012, Euro 2020 and the 2022 FIFA World Cup.

== Early life ==
De Jong was born in Aigle, Switzerland to Dutch professional volleyball players George de Jong and Loekie Raterink. When he was four years old, the family relocated to Doetinchem, Netherlands, where Luuk grew up along with his older brother Siem.

== Club career ==
=== De Graafschap ===
De Jong joined the youth academy of De Graafschap at the age of 10, before making his professional debut for the club at the age of 18 in a 2–0 loss to NAC Breda in the Eredivisie on 7 November 2008. He scored his first career goal against FC Twente on 8 February 2009.

On 6 April, De Jong announced he had signed a three-year contract with Twente, whom he would join for the start of the 2009–10 season.

In De Jong's final appearance for De Graafschap, the club was relegated to the Eerste Divisie, losing 1–0 to RKC Waalwijk in a play-off on 3 June.

=== Twente ===
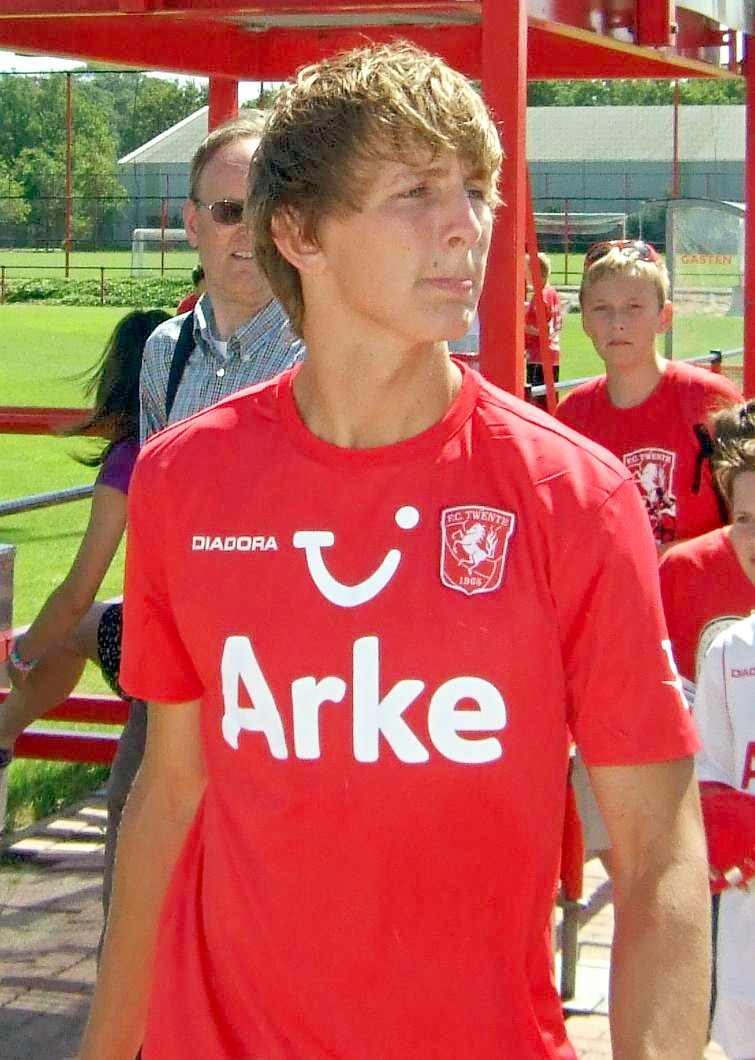
De Jong with Twente in 2010

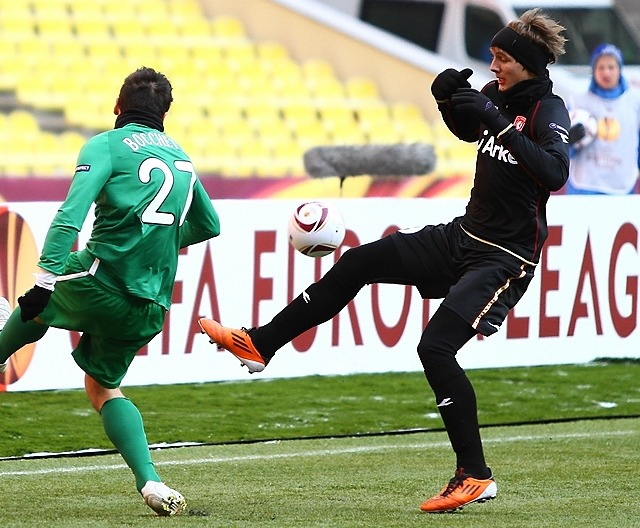
Luuk de Jong (right) in a 2011 Europa League match against Rubin Kazan

On 17 January 2010, De Jong made his debut for Twente as a substitute in an Eredivisie match against FC Utrecht. He scored his first goal for the club in a 2–1 win over NEC Nijmegen on 28 February. He ended the season with two goals from 12 appearances in the Eredivisie as the Enschede club won its first ever Dutch championship.

2010–11 would prove to be De Jong's breakout season. He scored twelve goals from 32 Eredivisie appearances, made his UEFA Champions League debut and played 106 minutes in the 2011 KNVB Cup Final, assisting goals for Wout Brama and Theo Janssen as Twente came from 2–0 down to beat Ajax 3–2 in Rotterdam. He ended the season with a total of 20 goals and 16 assists in all competitions.

On 20 August 2011, De Jong scored his first Eredivisie goal of the 2011–12 season in a 5–1 win over Heerenveen. The following week, on De Jong's 21st birthday, he found the back of the net two more times as Twente beat VVV Venlo 4–1.

De Jong scored two goals against Waalwijk on 21 January 2012 – a tap in to an open goal and a penalty – as Twente won 5–0. In Twente's following fixture against Groningen on 29 January, De Jong netted a hat-trick, each goal coming off an assist from Ola John, and provided an assist for Leroy Fer, as his side won 4–1 and climbed to second place in the league table. On 10 February, De Jong found the back of the net two more times, but Twente missed the chance to go top of the league table, as they lost 3–2 at home to Heracles. De Jong's two goals meant he had scored seven times in the past three Eredivisie fixtures.

On 8 March, in a Europa League match against Schalke 04, De Jong was the protagonist of a controversial penalty decision that resulted in a red card for Schalke defender Joël Matip, and a penalty kick which he himself successfully converted, to ensure the win for his side by 1–0. However, Twente ended up falling out of the competition, losing 4–1 in the second leg in Germany, as de Jong's fellow Dutchman Klaas-Jan Huntelaar netted a hat-trick.

De Jong scored twice in two minutes on 14 April to put his side 2–1 up away to Breda, but an injury-time strike from Nourdin Boukhari denied Twente the chance to close the gap on title rivals Ajax. He finished the season with 25 goals on a joint-second place, seven behind top-scorer Bas Dost.

At the end of the 2011–12 season, De Jong announced his decision to leave the club. Having attracted the interest of several clubs around Europe, including Premier League side Newcastle United, de Jong accused the club's chairman Joop Munsterman of increasing the asking price for him. In response, Joop Munsterman and Steve McClaren expressed dismay over de Jong's comments.

=== Borussia Mönchengladbach ===
On 18 July 2012, De Jong signed for Bundesliga side Borussia Mönchengladbach on a five-year deal, with a fee of €15 million (£12.6m), having stated it was his dream to join. Eight months later after the move, de Jong stated the Bundesliga was "a great place to develop as a player".

He made his debut with Mönchengladbach in a match against Munich 1860; his team ended up winning 4–2, however, De Jong was quite anonymous during his first match, failing to score or assist any goals. On 21 August, he started his first European game for Mönchengladbach and in the process scored an own goal from a free kick in a 3–1 defeat at the hands of Dynamo Kyiv during the Champions League Qualifiers. On 15 September, he scored his first goal for the club in a 3–2 defeat to 1. Nürnberg, converting a tap in after a cross from Patrick Herrmann. However, later in the season, De Jong's first team opportunities soon faded after falling out with manager Lucien Favre, and only made 23 appearances, scoring six times. Towards the end of the season, De Jong reiterated he was confident he could prove himself as the best striker.

However, in the 2013–14 season, De Jong's first team place remained limited, as his playing minutes significantly decreased and made 14 appearances in the first half of the season.

==== Newcastle United (loan) ====
On 29 January 2014, De Jong completed a loan signing with Premier League side Newcastle United until the end of the 2013–14 season. He made his debut on 1 February in the Tyne-Wear derby against Sunderland. In May 2014, it was announced that de Jong would be returning to Borussia Mönchengladbach after he failed to score in any of his twelve appearances for Newcastle.

=== PSV ===
On 12 July 2014, De Jong signed a five-year deal with PSV for a fee of €5.5m. Following his move to PSV, De Jong said he felt he had made a mistake by moving to Germany.

De Jong made his official debut for the club, where he scored in both legs, as PSV beat St. Pölten 4–2 on aggregate in the third round of Europa League.

It took until 31 August 2014 for De Jong to score his first league goal for the club, in a 2–0 win over Vitesse Arnhem. On 17 December 2014, De Jong scored his first hat-trick for the club in a 4–3 home win over Feyenoord, and his second on 13 February 2015 in a 4–2 away win over AZ Alkmaar. He also scored twice on 18 April, as the team defeated Heerenveen 4–1 for their 22nd Eredivisie title and first since 2008.

On 2 August 2015, De Jong scored a double to help PSV clinch the 2015 Johan Cruyff Shield.

=== Sevilla ===
On 1 July 2019, De Jong signed a four-year contract with Spanish club Sevilla. On 16 August 2020, de Jong scored the winning goal in a 2–1 victory over Manchester United in the semi-finals of the UEFA Europa League. On 21 August, he scored twice in a 3–2 win over Inter Milan in the final, whilst being named the man of the match. With his performance in the Europa League, he subsequently was named in the Squad of the Season.

On 28 October 2020, he scored the only goal in a 1–0 win against Rennes in the 2020–21 UEFA Champions League group stage.

==== Barcelona (loan) ====
On 31 August 2021, De Jong joined Barcelona on a season-long loan until 30 June 2022. On 23 September, he made his debut in a goalless draw against Cádiz, starting and playing 67 minutes before being substituted for Philippe Coutinho. Three days later, he scored his first goal for the club, assisted by Sergiño Dest, in a 3–0 La Liga victory over Levante.

=== Return to PSV ===
PSV announced on 2 July 2022 that De Jong would return to the club, where he signed a contract until mid-2025. He immediately got a starting place again, played the first two league games and scored once. During a qualifying match in the preliminary round of the Champions League, he sustained an injury which prevented him from playing for more than two months. Once recovered, he returned to the base and scored 14 goals in 24 rounds in the Eredivisie. With that, he brought his total number of Eredivisie goals for PSV to 108 and passed Romário, Mateja Kežman and Hallvar Thoresen in the list of all-time club top scorers. From that moment on he only had to tolerate Willy van der Kuijlen, Coen Dillen and Luc Nilis. On 4 August 2023 De Jong was the first player ever to play the match for the Johan Cruijff Shield for the seventh time. He won it for the sixth time that day. This put him on a level with Ronald Waterreus. Nevertheless, De Jong was also the first to win this prize six times by actually playing all these matches. Waterreus was the winner once while standing in reserve for ninety minutes.

De Jong finished second in the Eredivisie with PSV in 2022/23. As a result, he and his teammates were allowed to take part in the preliminary rounds of the Champions League in the early stages of 2023/24. The team from Eindhoven and he won twice against Sturm Graz in the third qualifying round (4–1 at home and 1–3 away). De Jong scored three times in those matches. With that, he brought his total number of goals in a European context on behalf of PSV to seventeen, just as many as Harry Lubse. Only Van der Kuijlen scored more often for PSV in European tournaments (29 times). De Jong then also scored in both games of the decisive play-off against Glasgow Rangers. This brought his total to nineteen and he passed Lubse. Because he and PSV won that meeting, he was also allowed to participate in the Champions League for the seventh time in his career. For PSV, this was the first time since 2018/19, the last year of De Jong's first period in Eindhoven service. On 20 February 2024, he converted a penalty kick against Borussia Dortmund to become the all-time top-scorer for PSV in the Champions League.

De Jong ended the 2023–24 season with 27 goals to share the Willy van der Kuijlen Trophy with AZ's Vangelis Pavlidis as he captained PSV to a 25th Eredivisie championship.

De Jong's future at PSV Eindhoven was uncertain after his contract expired on 30 June 2025 and did not train with the club. Despite this, he continued to train with PSV Eindhoven. His future at the club was further uncertain when Jerdy Schouten was appointed as the new captain of PSV Eindhoven. De Jong paid tribute to the club, stating that PSV Eindhoven will remain for the rest of his life. The club, in return, paid tribute to De Jong, stating "his years in the red and white form a story that will forever belong to PSV. A story of dedication, character and unconditional club love".

=== Porto ===
On 3 August 2025, it was announced that De Jong had signed a one-year contract with Primeira Liga club Porto. His signing was announced before the club was to play a pre-season friendly match against Atlético Madrid. Many found the transfer unusual due to the secrecy and the absence of transfer speculation in the days before the transfer. Porto kept the move secret by taking measures such as rushing De Jong into a private van with tinted windows after his flight landed, and registering his medical tests as being for a handball player.

Later that month, on 30 August, he netted his first goal for the club in a 2–1 away win over Sporting CP. On 8 September, during a training match against Liga Portugal 2 side Lusitânia de Lourosa, De Jong suffered a sprain in his left knee, injuring the medial collateral ligament, which sidelined him for almost three months. He returned from injury on 22 November, coming on as a substitute near the end of a 3–0 home victory over Sintrense in the fourth round of the Taça de Portugal. However, just eight days later, in a match against Estoril, de Jong suffered another left knee injury, this time a parcial tear in his anterior cruciate ligament, which sidelined him until the end of the season. In May 2026, after Porto were crowned Primeira Liga champions, de Jong left the club.

== International career ==
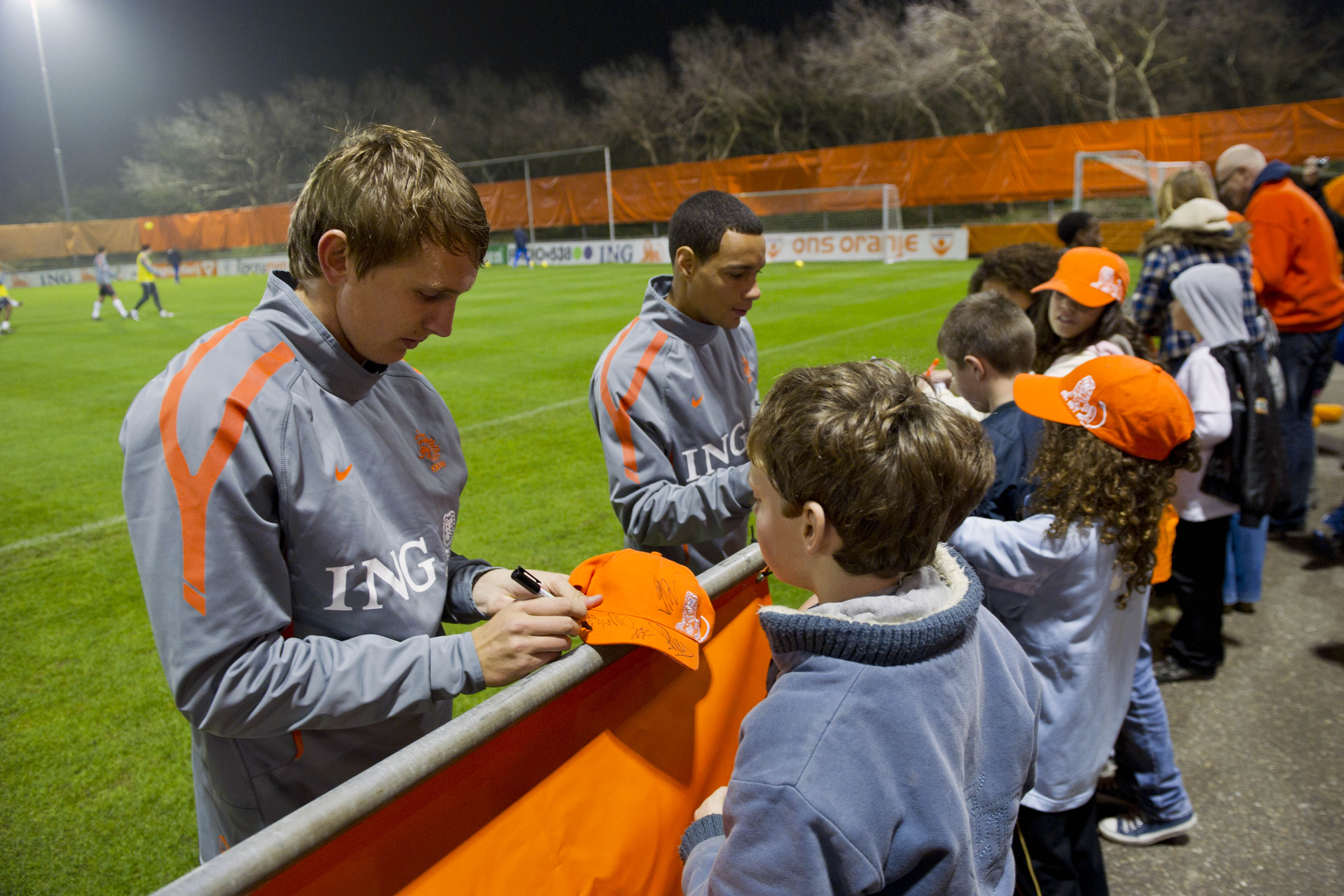
De Jong and teammate Gregory van der Wiel at an Oranje training session in 2011

De Jong received his first call-up for the Netherlands senior team for a friendly against Austria on 9 February 2011, making his debut in the same match, replacing Dirk Kuyt.

He scored his first international goal on 6 September 2011, in a 2–0 win during the UEFA Euro 2012 qualifying game against Finland that secured the Netherlands qualification to the finals.

On 7 May 2012, he was named in the provisional list of 36 players for UEFA Euro 2012 by Netherlands manager Bert van Marwijk. He was one of the 23 players chosen to represent the team in the tournament, but did not make any appearances.

De Jong was included in the Netherlands squad for both Euro 2020 and the 2022 FIFA World Cup.

On 3 March 2023, De Jong officially announced his retirement from the national team.

== Career statistics ==
=== Club ===
As of match played 30 November 2025

Appearances and goals by club, season and competition
Club	Season	League			National cup (Note: Includes KNVB Cup, DFB-Pokal, Copa del Rey and Taça de Portugal)		Continental		Other		Total	
Club	Season	Division	Apps	Goals	Apps	Goals	Apps	Goals	Apps	Goals	Apps	Goals
De Graafschap	2008–09	Eredivisie	14	2	2	0	—		3 (Note: Appearances in Eredivisie play-offs)	1	19	3
Twente	2009–10	Eredivisie	12	2	5	4	4 (Note: Appearance(s) in UEFA Europa League)	1	0	0	21	7
Twente	2010–11	Eredivisie	32	12	5	3	11 (Note: Six appearances and one goal in UEFA Champions League, five appearances and three goals in UEFA Europa League)	4	1 (Note: Appearance in Johan Cruyff Shield)	1	49	20
Twente	2011–12	Eredivisie	31	25	3	2	14 (Note: Four appearances and four one goal in UEFA Champions League, ten appearances and four goals in UEFA Europa League)	5	3 (Note: One appearance in Johan Cruyff Shield, two appearances in Eredivisie play-offs)	0	51	32
Twente	Total		75	39	13	9	29	10	4	1	121	59
Borussia Mönchengladbach	2012–13	Bundesliga	23	6	1	0	7 (Note: Two appearances in UEFA Champions League, five appearances and two goals in UEFA Europa League)	2	—		31	8
Borussia Mönchengladbach	2013–14	Bundesliga	13	0	1	0	—		—		14	0
Borussia Mönchengladbach	Total		36	6	2	0	7	2	—		45	8
Newcastle United (loan)	2013–14	Premier League	12	0	0	0	—		—		12	0
PSV	2014–15	Eredivisie	32	20	2	2	11	4	—		45	26
PSV	2015–16	Eredivisie	33	26	4	2	6 (Note: Appearances in UEFA Champions League)	2	1	2	44	32
PSV	2016–17	Eredivisie	32	8	1	0	5	1	1	0	39	9
PSV	2017–18	Eredivisie	28	12	3	1	2	0	—		33	13
PSV	2018–19	Eredivisie	34	28	0	0	8	4	1	0	43	32
PSV	Total		159	94	10	5	32	11	3	2	204	112
Sevilla	2019–20	La Liga	35	6	3	1	8	3	—		46	10
Sevilla	2020–21	La Liga	34	4	7	3	6	2	1 (Note: Appearance in UEFA Super Cup)	0	48	9
Sevilla	Total		69	10	10	4	14	5	1	0	94	19
Barcelona (loan)	2021–22	La Liga	21	6	0	0	7 (Note: Three appearances in UEFA Champions League, four appearances in UEFA Europa League)	0	1 (Note: Appearance in Supercopa de España)	1	29	7
PSV	2022–23	Eredivisie	24	14	5	1	9 (Note: Four appearances and one goal in UEFA Champions League, five appearances and two goals in UEFA Europa League)	3	1	0	39	18
PSV	2023–24	Eredivisie	34	29	2	1	11	8	1	0	48	38
PSV	2024–25	Eredivisie	31	14	3	0	12	2	1	2	47	18
PSV	Total		89	57	10	2	32	13	3	2	134	74
Porto	2025–26	Primeira Liga	5	1	1	0	1	0	0	0	7	1
Career total			480	215	48	20	122	41	15	7	665	283

=== International ===
Appearances and goals by national team and year
National team	Year	Apps	Goals
Netherlands	2011	6	1
Netherlands	2012	1	0
Netherlands	2013	0	0
Netherlands	2014	0	0
Netherlands	2015	2	0
Netherlands	2016	3	2
Netherlands	2017	2	1
Netherlands	2018	3	0
Netherlands	2019	7	1
Netherlands	2020	8	0
Netherlands	2021	6	3
Netherlands	2022	1	0
Total		39	8

Scores and results list Netherlands' goal tally first.

List of international goals scored by Luuk de Jong
No.	Date	Venue	Opponent	Score	Result	Competition
1	6 September 2011	Olympic Stadium, Helsinki, Finland	Finland	2–0	2–0	UEFA Euro 2012 qualifying
2	25 March 2016	Amsterdam Arena, Amsterdam, Netherlands	France	1–2	2–3	Friendly
3	27 May 2016	Aviva Stadium, Dublin, Ireland	Republic of Ireland	1–0	1–1	Friendly
4	14 November 2017	Arena Națională, Bucharest, Romania	Romania	3–0	3–0	Friendly
5	10 October 2019	De Kuip, Rotterdam, Netherlands	Northern Ireland	2–1	3–1	UEFA Euro 2020 qualifying
6	24 March 2021	Atatürk Olympic Stadium, Istanbul, Turkey	Turkey	2–3	2–4	2022 FIFA World Cup qualification
7	27 March 2021	Johan Cruyff Arena, Amsterdam, Netherlands	Latvia	2–0	2–0	2022 FIFA World Cup qualification
8	30 March 2021	Victoria Stadium, Gibraltar	Gibraltar	2–0	7–0	2022 FIFA World Cup qualification

== Honours ==
Twente

- Eredivisie: 2009–10
- KNVB Cup: 2010–11
- Johan Cruyff Shield: 2010, 2011

PSV

- Eredivisie: 2014–15, 2015–16, 2017–18, 2023–24, 2024–25
- KNVB Cup: 2022–23
- Johan Cruyff Shield: 2015, 2016, 2022, 2023

Sevilla

- UEFA Europa League: 2019–20

Porto

- Primeira Liga: 2025–26

Individual

- Eredivisie top scorer: 2018–19 (shared), 2023–24 (shared)
- Eredivisie Team of the Season: 2017–18, 2018–19, 2022–23, 2024–25
- UEFA Europa League Squad of the Season: 2019–20
- Eredivisie Player of the Month: April 2023, February 2024
- Eredivisie Player of the Season: 2023–24
- Dutch Footballer of the Year: 2023–24
