= 2000–01 FC Utrecht season =

FC Utrecht
2000–01 season
- Chairman: Gerrit Bloemink
- Head coach: Frans Adelaar
- Stadium: Stadion Galgenwaard
- Eredivisie: 5th
- KNVB Cup: Round of 16
- Top goalscorer: League: Igor Gluščević (19); All: Igor Gluščević (19)

The 2000–01 season was the 51st season in the history of FC Utrecht and the club's 31st consecutive season in the top flight of Dutch football. In addition to the domestic league, FC Utrecht participated in this season's editions of the KNVB Cup.

== Pre-season and friendlies ==
Win Draw Loss

== Competitions ==
=== Overall record ===
Competition	First match	Last match	Starting round	Final position	Record							
Competition	First match	Last match	Starting round	Final position	Pld	W	D	L	GF	GA	GD	Win %
Eredivisie	20 August 2000	27 May 2001	Matchday 1	5th	34	17	8	9	58	43	+15	50.00
KNVB Cup	11 August 2000	26 January 2001	Group stage	Round of 16	6	5	0	1	28	3	+25	83.33
Total					40	22	8	10	86	46	+40	55.00

Source: Competitions

=== Eredivisie ===
==== League table ====
Pos	Team	Pld	W	D	L	GF	GA	GD	Pts	Qualification or relegation
3	Ajax	34	18	7	9	85	43	+42	61	Qualification to Champions League third qualifying round
4	Roda JC Kerkrade	34	17	8	9	59	41	+18	59	Qualification to UEFA Cup first round (Note: FC Twente qualified for the UEFA Cup by winning the 2000–01 KNVB Cup.)
5	Utrecht	34	17	8	9	58	43	+15	59	Qualification to UEFA Cup first round
6	Vitesse	34	16	11	7	56	43	+13	59	
7	RKC Waalwijk	34	16	11	7	48	36	+12	59	Qualification to Intertoto Cup third round

Source: voetbal.com
Rules for classification: 1) Points; 2) Goal difference; 3) Goals scored; 4) Head-to-head points; 5) Head-to-head goal difference; 6) Head-to-head away goals scored; 7) Play-off if relevant for deciding champion, relegation or participating in a European league, otherwise by draw. 8) Penalty shoot-out (only after a play-off)

==== Results summary ====
Overall								Home						Away					
Pld	W	D	L	GF	GA	GD	Pts	W	D	L	GF	GA	GD	W	D	L	GF	GA	GD
34	17	8	9	58	43	+15	59	11	4	2	36	14	+22	6	4	7	22	29	−7

Source: Eredivisie

==== Results by round ====
Round	1	2	3	4	5	6	7	8	9	10	11	12	13	14	15	16	17	18	19	20	21	22	23	24	25	26	27	28	29	30	31	32	33	34
Ground	H	H		A	H	A	A	A	H	H	A	H	A	A	H	H	A	H	A	H	A	H	A	H	A	A	H	A	H	A	A	H	A	H
Result	W	L	P	D	L	W	L	L	W	D	L	D	L	L	W	W	W	W	W	W	W	D	L	W	L	W	W	D	W	W	D	W	D	W
Position	4	10		13	15																													

Source: Eredivisie
A = Away; H = Home; W = Win; D = Draw; L = Loss

==== Matches ====
20 August 2000	Utrecht	2–0	Heerenveen	Utrecht
				Referee: Jan Wegereef

27 August 2000	Utrecht	1–3	PSV	Utrecht
				Referee: Dick Jol

10 September 2000	NEC Nijmegen	1–1	NEC Nijmegen	Nijmegen
				Referee: Roelof Luinge

17 September 2000	Utrecht	1–2	Twente	Utrecht
				Referee: Ruud Bossen

24 September 2000	Groningen	1–3	Utrecht	Groningen
				Referee: Mario van der Ende

1 October 2000	Vitesse	2–1	Utrecht	Arnhem
				Referee: Jaap Uilenberg

14 October 2000	Willem II	6–2	Utrecht	Tilburg
				Referee: Dick van Egmond

22 October 2000	Utrecht	5–3	RBC Roosendaal	Utrecht
				Referee: Hennie de Graaf

29 October 2000	Utrecht	1–1	Feyenoord	Utrecht
				Referee: Herman van Dijk

1 November 2000	RKC Waalwijk	4–1	Utrecht	Waalwijk
				Referee: Jack van Hulten

5 November 2000	Utrecht	1–1	Sparta Rotterdam	Utrecht
				Referee: Roelof Luinge

12 November 2000	AZ	2–1	Utrecht	Alkmaar
				Referee: Ruud Bossen

17 November 2000	Roda JC Kerkrade	2–1	Utrecht	Kerkrade
				Referee: René Temmink

26 November 2000	Utrecht	2–1	Ajax	Utrecht
				Referee: Roelof Luinge

2 December 2000	Fortuna Sittard	0–1	Utrecht	Sittard
				Referee: Mario van der Ende

10 December 2000	Utrecht	5–0	NAC Breda	Utrecht
				Referee: Fred Sterk

17 December 2000	De Graafschap	0–3	Utrecht	Doetinchem
				Referee: Jaap Uilenberg

20 December 2000	Utrecht	2–1	RKC Waalwijk	Utrecht
				Referee: Eugene Westerink

11 February 2001	Utrecht	1–1	NEC Nijmegen	Utrecht
				Referee: Hennie de Graaf

18 February 2001	Utrecht	3–1	De Graafschap	Utrecht
				Referee: Rien Koopman

25 February 2001	Ajax	2–0	Utrecht	Amsterdam
				Referee: Jaap Uilenberg

4 March 2001	Utrecht	1–0	Fortuna Sittard	Utrecht
				Referee: Ruud Bossen

11 March 2001	Utrecht	0–0	Vitesse	Utrecht
				Referee: Dick Jol

18 March 2001	PSV	5–1	Utrecht	Eindhoven
				Referee: René Temmink

1 April 2001	Sparta Rotterdam	0–1	Utrecht	Rotterdam
				Referee: Jan Wegereef

6 April 2001	Utrecht	1–0	AZ	Utrecht
				Referee: Ger Buiting

16 April 2001	Twente	0–0	Utrecht	Enschede
				Referee: Jack van Hulten

20 April 2001	Utrecht	1–0	Willem II	Utrecht
				Referee: Herman van Dijk

29 April 2001	RBC Roosendaal	1–2	Utrecht	Roosendaal
				Referee: Eric Braamhaar

2 May 2001	Heerenveen	1–2	Utrecht	Heerenveen
				Referee: Dick van Egmond

6 May 2001	NAC Breda	0–0	Utrecht	Breda
				Referee: Roelof Luinge

13 May 2001	Utrecht	3–0	Roda JC Kerkrade	Utrecht
				Referee: Ruud Bossen

20 May 2001	Feyenoord	2–2	Utrecht	Rotterdam
				Referee: Ben Haverkort

27 May 2001	Utrecht	6–0	Groningen	Utrecht
				Referee: Mario van der Ende

=== KNVB Cup ===
==== Group stage ====
Group 6

11 August 2000	Utrecht	4–0	Haarlem

23 August 2000	Utrecht	3–0	ADO '20

13 September 2000	IJsselmeervogels	1–8	Utrecht

==== Second round ====
21 September 2000	Utrecht	10–0	BV Veendam	Utrecht

==== Third round ====
19 October 2000	MVV Maastricht	0–3	Utrecht	Maastricht

==== Round of 16 ====
26 January 2001	Roda JC Kerkrade	2–0	Utrecht	Kerkrade
