= Leon van Dijk =

Dutch footballer (born 1992)

Personal information
- Full name: Leon van Dijk
- Date of birth: 9 March 1992 (age 34)
- Place of birth: Enschede, Netherlands
- Height: 1.78 m (5 ft 10 in)
- Position: Right back

Team information
- Current team: WVV '34 (head coach)

Youth career
- Enschedese Boys
- Twente

Senior career*
| Years | Team | Apps | (Gls) |
| 2011–2014 | Heracles Almelo | 4 | (0) |
| 2014–2018 | HSC '21 | 65 | (1) |
- * Club domestic league appearances and goals

Leon van Dijk (born 9 March 1992) is a Dutch retired footballer, who played as a right back.

== Club career ==
He started his career in the combined youth department of FC Twente and Go Ahead Eagles.

Later, at the end of the 2011–12 season, van Dijk transferred to Heracles Almelo.

=== Heracles Almelo ===
Leon van Dijk transferred from the combined youth department of FC Twente and Go Ahead Eagles to Heracles Almelo at the end of the 2010–11 season. He signed a two-year contract with the option of an extra year.

Van Dijk only played 4 matches as a professional, he moved to amateur team HSC '21 in 2014.

== Post-playing career ==
Van Dijk was named manager of amateur side WVV '34 in summer 2025, succeeding another former professional footballer, Niki Leferink. He had retired from playing due to injury and worked as a youth- and assistant head coach at HSC 21.

== Personal life ==
In 2014, Van Dijk was selected to enter The Voice of Holland singing competition, but did not progress to the next round.
