= Blaise Nkufo =

Swiss footballer (born 1975)

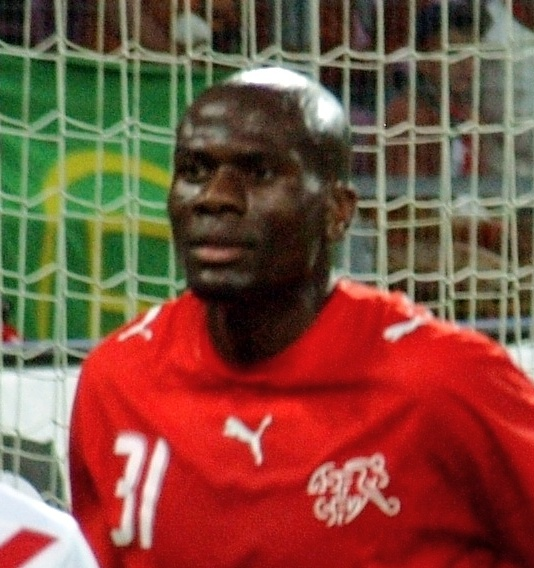
- Nkufo playing for Switzerland in 2007

Personal information
- Full name: Isetsima Blaise Nkufo
- Date of birth: 25 May 1975 (age 51)
- Place of birth: Kinshasa, Zaire
- Height: 1.86 m (6 ft 1 in)
- Position: Striker

Senior career*
Years	Team	Apps	(Gls)
1993–1994	Lausanne	2	(0)
1994–1995	Echallens	16	(9)
1995–1996	Al-Arabi	12	(6)
1996–1997	Yverdon	35	(12)
1997–1998	Lausanne	34	(18)
1998–2000	Grasshopper	18	(4)
1999–2000	→ Lugano (loan)	21	(14)
2000–2001	Lucerne	19	(7)
2001–2002	Mainz 05	42	(20)
2002–2003	Hannover 96	9	(0)
2003–2010	Twente	223	(114)
2010	Seattle Sounders FC	11	(5)
Total		442	(209)

International career
2000–2010	Switzerland	34	(7)

Managerial career
- 2017-: Rino's Tigers
- * Club domestic league appearances and goals

Isetsima Blaise Nkufo (born 25 May 1975) is a Swiss former international footballer who played as a striker and current coach of Rino's Tigers in the Vancouver Metro Soccer League.

He was born in Zaire and raised in Switzerland from the age of seven. Nkufo played professionally in Switzerland, Qatar, Germany, the Netherlands, and the United States, scoring 209 goals in 442 career league appearances. Nkufo was also a member of the Switzerland national team, having won 34 caps and scored seven goals. He played for them at the 2010 World Cup.

== Club career ==
Nkufo played for Lausanne Sport, FC Echallens, Al-Arabi, Yverdon-Sport FC, Grasshopper Club Zürich, AC Lugano, FC Lucerne, Mainz 05, Hannover 96, FC Twente and Seattle Sounders FC.

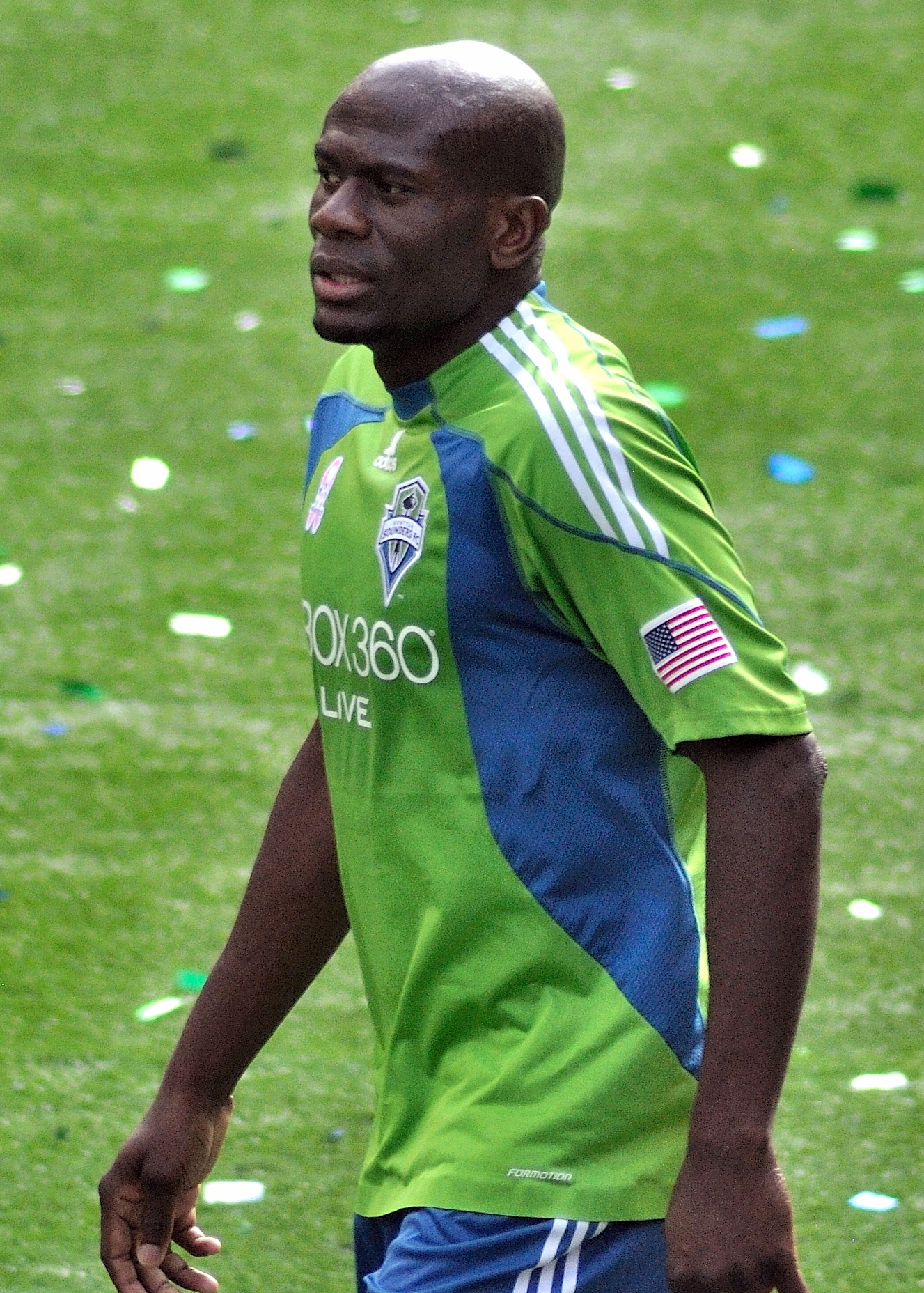
Nkufo playing for Seattle Sounders FC.

In early 2010, Nkufo left Twente and was linked to sign with the Major League Soccer team Seattle Sounders FC. On 4 March 2010, the Sounders confirmed that they had signed Nkufo and that he would be joining the Sounders' squad on 13 July 2010 when his contract with Twente expired. In his final season with Twente, Nkufo scored 12 Eredivisie goals helping the club to their first league title in their 45-year history. Nkufo made 223 Eredivisie appearances for Twente, and scored 114 goals - a club record. Twente erected a statue in his honour outside of the stadium following his departure.

His first appearance for the Sounders was on 18 July 2010 during a friendly vs. Celtic. Nkufo was the first Sounders player to record a hat-trick in league play, doing so against the Columbus Crew on 18 September 2010. It ended a scoreless drought of 415 minutes for him after joining the club. On 5 October 2010, Nkufo featured in the final of the U.S. Open Cup as the Sounders defeated the Columbus Crew by a score of 2–1. On 15 March 2011, Seattle and Nkufo agreed mutually to the termination of his deal. Nkufo announced his retirement thirteen days later.

== International career ==
Nkufo made his international debut for Switzerland in 2000. He was a squad member at the 2010 World Cup in South Africa. At the tournament, Nkufo played an influential role in helping the Swiss upset eventual world champions Spain in the group stage.

== Career statistics ==
=== Club ===
Appearances and goals by club, season and competition
Club	Season	League			National cup (Note: Includes Swiss Cup, DFB-Pokal, KNVB Cup, U.S. Open Cup)		Continental		Other		Total	
Club	Season	Division	Apps	Goals	Apps	Goals	Apps	Goals	Apps	Goals	Apps	Goals
Luzern	2000–01	Swiss Nationalliga A	19	7	1	2	—		—		20	9
1. FSV Mainz 05	2000–01	2. Bundesliga	14	6	—		—		—		14	6
1. FSV Mainz 05	2001–02	2. Bundesliga	28	14	3	1	—		—		31	15
1. FSV Mainz 05	Total		42	20	3	1	—		—		45	21
Hannover 96	2002–03	Bundesliga	9	0	2	2	—		—		11	2
FC Twente	2003–04	Eredivisie	28	14	3	2	—		—		31	16
FC Twente	2004–05	Eredivisie	32	16	2	3	—		—		34	19
FC Twente	2005–06	Eredivisie	32	12	1	0	—		6 (Note: Appearances in Eredivisie UEFA competition play-offs)	3	39	15
FC Twente	2006–07	Eredivisie	34	22	0	0	4 (Note: Two appearances in UEFA Intertoto Cup, two appearances in UEFA Cup)	0	2	0	40	22
FC Twente	2007–08	Eredivisie	34	22	1	0	2 (Note: Appearances in UEFA Cup)	0	4	3	41	25
FC Twente	2008–09	Eredivisie	31	16	6	4	6	1	—		43	21
FC Twente	2009–10	Eredivisie	32	12	2	2	11 (Note: Two appearances in UEFA Champions League, nine appearances and two goals in UEFA Europa League)	2	—		45	16
FC Twente	Total		223	114	15	11	23	3	12	6	273	134
Seattle Sounders FC	2010	MLS	11	5	1	0	2 (Note: Appearances in CONCACAF Champions League)	0	2 (Note: Appearances in MLS Cup Playoffs)	0	16	5
Career total			304	146	22	16	25	3	14	6	365	171

=== International ===
Scores and results list Switzerland's goal tally first, score column indicates score after each Nkufo goal.

List of international goals scored by Blaise Nkufo
No.	Date	Venue	Opponent	Score	Result	Competition
1	15 May 2002	Espenmoos, St. Gallen, Switzerland	Canada		1–3	Friendly
2	11 September 2007	Wörthersee Stadion, Klagenfurt, Austria	Japan		3–4	Friendly
3	6 September 2008	Ramat Gan National Stadium, Tel Aviv, Israel	Israel		2–2	2010 FIFA World Cup qualifier
4	10 September 2008	Letzigrund, Zürich, Switzerland	Luxembourg		1–2	2010 FIFA World Cup qualifier
5	11 October 2008	Kybunpark, St. Gallen, Switzerland	Latvia		2–1	2010 FIFA World Cup qualifier
6	15 October 2008	Olympic Stadium, Athens, Greece	Greece		2–1	2010 FIFA World Cup qualifier
7	1 April 2009	Stade de Genève, Geneva, Switzerland	Moldova		2–0	2010 FIFA World Cup qualifier

== Coaching career ==
Nkufo owned the Nkufo Academy Sports in the Greater Vancouver area, is managing director of the Blaise Soccer Elite Training INC, and works as Head coach of Rino's Tigers in the Vancouver Metro Soccer League Premier Division.

== Personal life ==
Born in Kinshasa, Zaire, Nkufo emigrated to Switzerland with his family when he was seven and became naturalised as a Swiss citizen.

Nkufo is married to a woman from Vancouver, British Columbia.

== Name confusion ==
Nkufo has himself said in interviews that his surname is Nkufo. The incorrect version N'Kufo is often found in media. The surname is pronounced Kufo, without the N.

== Honours ==
Twente

- Eredivisie: 2009–10

Seattle Sounders FC

- U.S. Open Cup: 2010
