= Dirk Kuyt =

Dutch football manager (born 1980)

- Kuyt with Fenerbahçe in 2026

Personal information
- Full name: Dirk Kuijt
- Date of birth: 22 July 1980 (age 46)
- Place of birth: Katwijk, Netherlands
- Height: 1.84 m (6 ft 0 in)
- Positions: Forward; right winger

Youth career
- 1985–1998: Quick Boys

Senior career*
Years	Team	Apps	(Gls)
1998–2003	Utrecht	160	(51)
2003–2006	Feyenoord	101	(71)
2006–2012	Liverpool	208	(51)
2012–2015	Fenerbahçe	95	(26)
2015–2017	Feyenoord	63	(31)
Total		627	(230)

International career
1998–1999	Netherlands U18	5	(2)
2000–2001	Netherlands U21	11	(6)
2004–2014	Netherlands	104	(24)

Managerial career
- 2018–2020: Feyenoord (U19)
- 2022: ADO Den Haag
- 2023–2025: Beerschot
- 2025–2026: FC Dordrecht
- 2026: Fenerbahçe (assistant)
- 2026: Fenerbahçe (interim)
Medal record
Representing Netherlands
Men's football
FIFA World Cup
Runner-up	2010 South Africa	Team
Third place	2014 Brazil	Team
- * Club domestic league appearances and goals

Dirk Kuijt (Dutch: [ˈdɪr(ə) ˈkœyt]; born 22 July 1980), anglicised to Kuyt, is a Dutch former professional footballer and manager who last served as the assistant manager of Süper Lig club Fenerbahçe. Originally starting out as a forward, he played much of his career as a right-winger.

Kuyt began his professional career with Utrecht in 1998 and became part of their first-team. He spent five years at the club, and in his final season he won his first senior honour, the KNVB Cup, and was chosen as the season's Dutch Golden Shoe Winner. Following this, he left Utrecht in a €1 million transfer to Feyenoord. He became the club captain in 2005 and was a prolific goalscorer at the Rotterdam club; he was the club's top scorer for three consecutive seasons, the top goalscorer in the 2004–05 Eredivisie season, and the 2005–06 Dutch Footballer of the Year. Kuyt missed five games over seven seasons from 1999 until 2006 and appeared in 179 consecutive matches between 2001 and 2006, striking up a partnership with fellow Feyenoord teammate Salomon Kalou.

He left Feyenoord after three years, having scored 71 league goals in 101 appearances, and joined Premier League side Liverpool for £10 million. He scored in the Champions League final which Liverpool lost 2–1 to Milan. He scored several goals for Liverpool elsewhere, including seven goals in the 2007–08 Champions League, including a goal in the quarter-finals against Arsenal at Emirates Stadium and in the semi-finals against Chelsea, and two penalty kicks against Everton in the derby the same season. He scored his first hat-trick for Liverpool against Manchester United on 6 March 2011. After coming on as a substitute, his extra-time goal at Wembley for Liverpool against Cardiff City in the 2012 League Cup final helped win the trophy for Liverpool, and was also his only trophy as a Liverpool player.

Kuyt played for the Netherlands from 2004 to 2014. He represented the nation at five major international tournaments, the FIFA World Cup in 2006, 2010, and 2014 and the UEFA European Championship in 2008 and 2012.

Kuyt announced his retirement from professional football in 2017, having scored a hat-trick in the final game of the season to secure Feyenoord their first Eredivisie title since 1999 three days earlier. He briefly came out of retirement the following April, to help out Quick Boys, where he already was the assistant-manager, to fix their shortage on strikers for the remainder of the season.

== Early life and career ==
Dirk Kuijt was born on 22 July 1980 in Katwijk aan Zee, the third of four children. His father was a fisherman, and Kuyt has recalled that in Katwijk it was normal for boys to join their fathers at sea for the first time around the age of twelve. At that age he chose football over the fishing trade, reasoning that the demands of a working trip would force him to miss weekday training sessions and ultimately Saturday matches.

Kuyt had joined the local amateur club Quick Boys at the age of five, choosing the Katwijk club over the geographically closer VV Katwijk. As a youth player he was selected for regional representative sides, and drew early interest from Haarlem, Telstar and ADO Den Haag. His route into Quick Boys' first team came about through circumstance: in early 1998, first-team striker Pieter Slootweg announced his intention to join rivals VV Katwijk, making him unwelcome at the club and leaving a vacancy in attack. Kuyt, then an under-19 player, was given his chance; Quick Boys won the remaining six matches of the Hoofdklasse season, with Kuyt contributing three goals. His performances attracted interest from FC Utrecht, who invited him to a trial in Zeist alongside other prominent amateur players. "A few weeks later Hans van Breukelen called to ask whether I wanted to join FC Utrecht", Kuyt later recalled. "That was very strange, because he was one of my heroes from Euro 1988". On 7 May 1998, Kuyt and Quick Boys team-mate Hendrik van Beelen signed professional contracts with Utrecht.

== Club career ==
=== Utrecht ===
==== 1998–2001: Establishing himself ====
Although Utrecht had initially planned to develop Kuyt in their reserve side, injuries during pre-season preparations meant he was drafted into the first-team squad within days of his arrival. He made his competitive debut on 30 August 1998 under manager Mark Wotte, coming on as a late substitute for Michael Mols in a 3–0 home win over Cambuur; his first professional goal followed on 20 September in a 1–1 draw against Fortuna Sittard. He ended the debut season with five goals in 29 appearances, relying mostly on substitute appearances. Kuyt later reflected that in those early months experienced midfielder Alfons Groenendijk—who commuted with him daily from Katwijk to Utrecht—proved an important mentor.

When Mols departed for Rangers in the summer of 1999, Kuyt became the new crowd favourite at the Galgenwaard. Under Frans Adelaar, who served as head coach from 2000, Kuyt formed a productive attacking partnership with Igor Gluščević. In the 2000–01 season, the pair combined for 32 league goals, with Gluščević the primary striker and top scorer of the season on 19. That campaign also saw Utrecht qualify for European football for the first time in a decade.

==== 2001–2003: Cup glory and departure ====
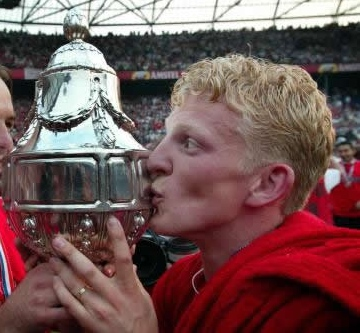
Kuyt celebrates winning the KNVB Cup with Utrecht in 2003

In the 2001–02 KNVB Cup, Utrecht reached the final at De Kuip, where they narrowly lost to Ajax; a late goal by Wamberto that was adjudged onside denied Utrecht victory deep into added time. Kuyt was suspended for that match. The following season, Foeke Booy was appointed as head coach alongside his assistant John van Loen, and Kuyt's scoring output increased markedly, with the club crediting his development to the guidance of a coaching staff that included two former Dutch strikers. Kuyt acknowledged the influence of both men directly, noting that "especially those last two are not bad people for a striker to learn from".

Utrecht entered the 2002–03 KNVB Cup motivated by what many in the club regarded as an injustice the previous spring. On 1 June 2003, they faced Feyenoord in the final, played at Feyenoord's home ground De Kuip. The occasion carried additional significance for Kuyt: he had already signed a pre-contract with Feyenoord, making it his final appearance in Utrecht colours—and one against his future employers. Utrecht were commanding throughout, with goals from Jean-Paul de Jong, Gluščević, and Kuyt giving them a 4–1 victory; Salomon Kalou scored Feyenoord's consolation. Reflecting on the goal, Kuyt said: "That goal actually had everything. I had signed for Feyenoord—that was a dream—but I also wanted to finish well at Utrecht and immediately show Feyenoord what I could do". Booy later described Kuyt's performances that season as consistently decisive, noting that even on an off-day he was "good enough."

Kuyt ended the 2002–03 campaign as the Gouden Schoen winner, the Dutch football writers' prize for the outstanding player of the season. He left Utrecht that summer in a €1 million transfer to Feyenoord, where he succeeded Pierre van Hooijdonk, who had departed for Fenerbahçe shortly before Kuyt's arrival. In five seasons at Utrecht, Kuyt made 184 appearances across all competitions and scored 66 goals.

=== Feyenoord ===
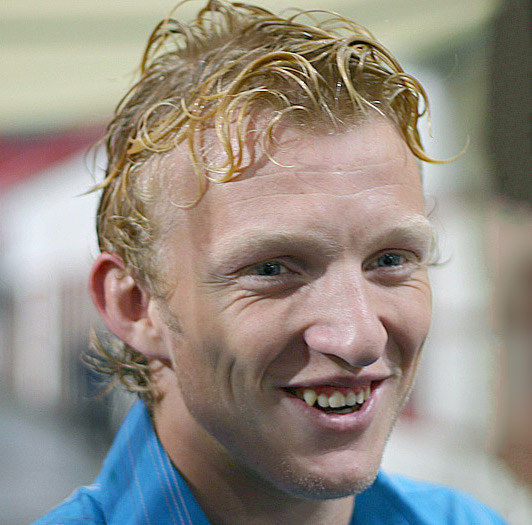
Kuyt with Feyenoord in 2005

At Feyenoord, Kuyt immediately became a fan favourite with his continued goal scoring success. His first season saw him net another 20 league goals. The opening game of the 2004–05 season marked Kuyt's first ever hat-trick against De Graafschap. He later went on to score three in the 6–3 victory against ADO Den Haag and ended the season as the Eredivisie's top scorer with 29 goals, a career high.

In 2005, Kuyt was handed the Feyenoord captaincy and went on to have a third successful season with the club, scoring 25 goals in all competitions. He formed a strong partnership with Salomon Kalou, with the duo nicknamed "K2".

In the summer of 2006, Kuyt was again linked with moves to many top English clubs, most notably Liverpool and Newcastle United. Rumours began in May, with Kuyt stating: "I am happy at Feyenoord but I would like to play in the Premier League". Kuyt completed a move to Liverpool on 18 August for an undisclosed fee.

Kuyt missed only five games over seven seasons from 1999 until 2006, making 233 appearances. Between March 2001 and April 2006, he played 179 consecutive matches.

=== Liverpool ===
==== 2006–07 season ====
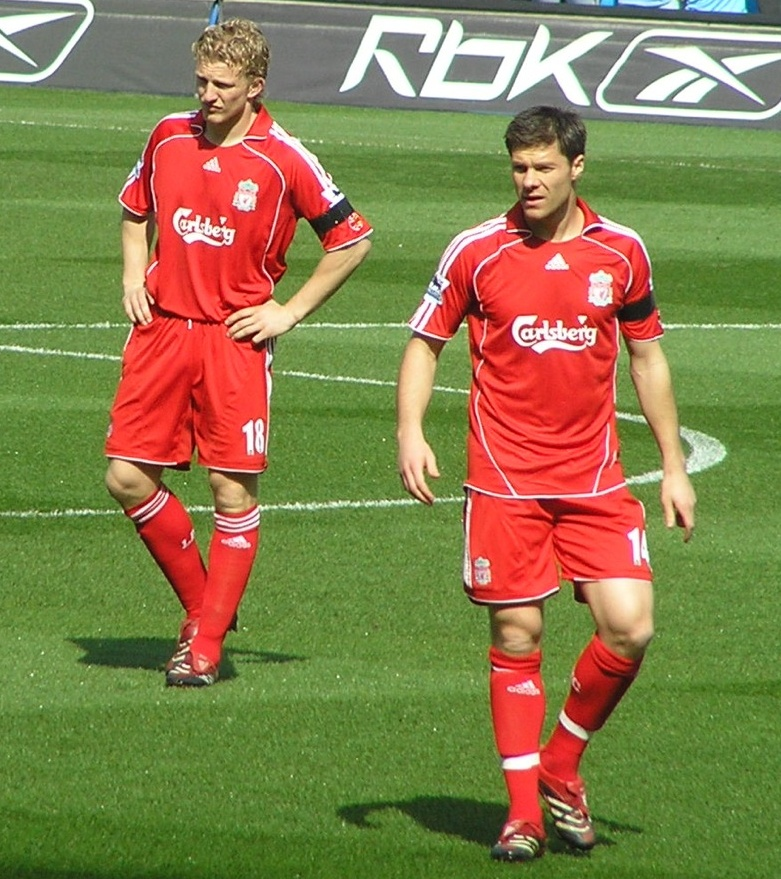
Kuyt (left) playing for Liverpool in 2007

Upon joining Liverpool, Kuyt stated: "I only wanted to leave Feyenoord for a really big club, and that is what Liverpool are. They are a fantastic big club and it will be a real pleasure to play here".

Kuyt made his Liverpool debut as a substitute against West Ham United on 26 August 2006. His first start came against PSV Eindhoven in the UEFA Champions League, immediately receiving praise for the new defensive approach by a striker. In his third start for the club, Kuyt scored his first Liverpool goal in a 2–0 win against Newcastle United at Anfield in the Premier League, and followed up with another in a 3–0 win against Tottenham Hotspur in the next match. He scored his third goal for Liverpool – with his father watching the match at Anfield – contributing to Liverpool's 3–1 win over Aston Villa. Two weeks later, he bagged a brace as the only scorer in the Reds' 2–0 victory against Reading.

Kuyt won much praise for his early performances, with the Daily Mirror writing: "The Dutch striker has the look of a cult hero in the making", and The People reporting that he is "propelling himself towards iconic status". One of the reasons for his early popularity was his post-match courtesy to the fans; after each match, he would walk to every corner of the ground and applaud the Liverpool supporters.

On 20 January 2007, Kuyt opened the scoring against Chelsea after only 4 minutes as Liverpool went on to defeat the reigning Premier League champions 2–0, marking the first time Rafael Benítez had defeated José Mourinho in the Premier League. It was also the first goal scored by Liverpool against a top four club in the league in the 2006–07 season. Kuyt moved his league-goal tally into double figures by scoring the first goal in the match against West Ham United on 30 January 2007, opening the scoring in a 2–1 away win at Upton Park.

Kuyt played a key part in Liverpool's penalty shoot-out win over Chelsea in the semi-finals of the 2006–07 UEFA Champions League. In extra-time, he had a goal disallowed for offside from Xabi Alonso's strike. Kuyt also scored the winning kick in the penalty shoot-out, and scored a consolation goal in the club's 2–1 defeat to Milan in the final.

==== 2007–08 season ====
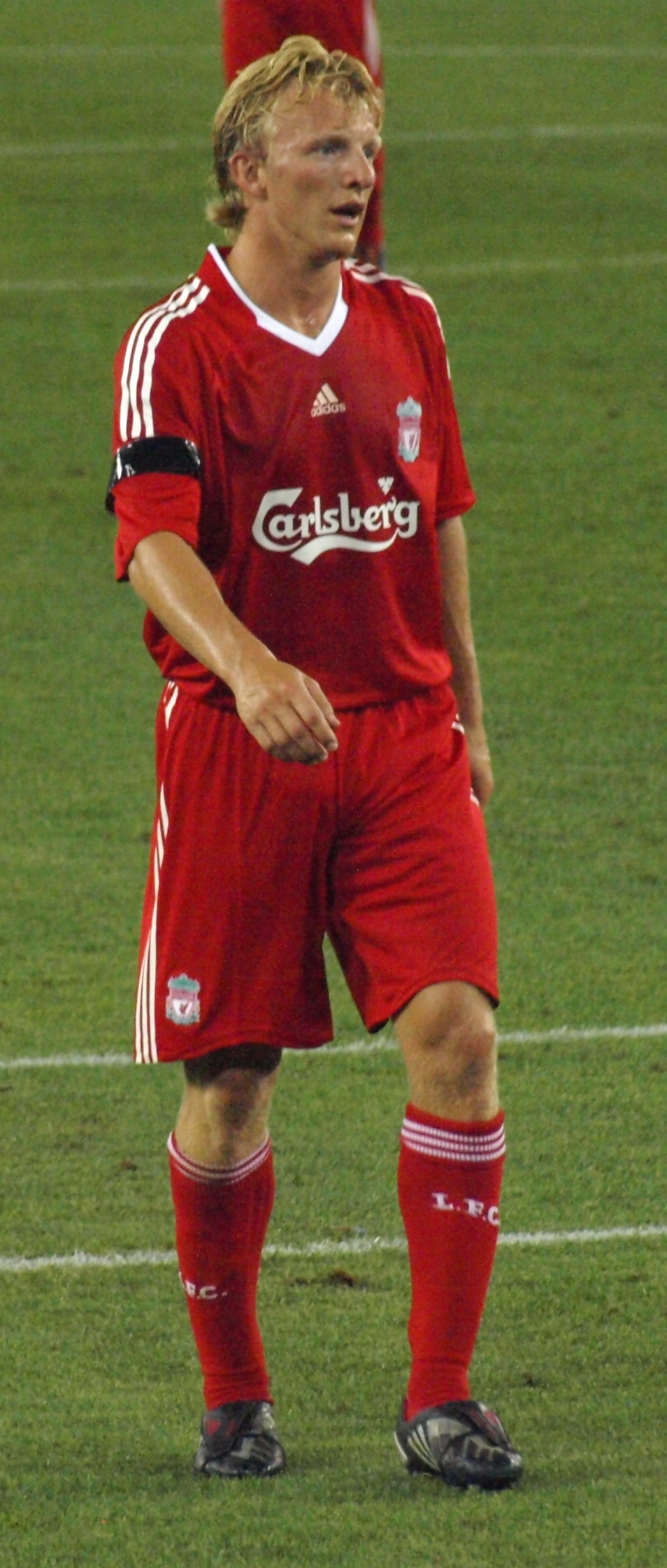
Kuyt playing for Liverpool in 2009

Kuyt scored his first goals of the 2007–08 season in Liverpool's 4–0 Champions League qualifying victory over Toulouse on 28 August 2007. He scored two penalties against Everton in the Merseyside derby to give Liverpool a 2–1 win. His third and final league goal of the season came in a 3–0 away win over Newcastle United on 24 November 2007; Kuyt would not score another league goal until 5 October 2008. In all competitions, he failed to score in 13 matches for Liverpool before netting against Barnsley in the fifth round of the FA Cup on 16 February 2008.

On 19 February 2008, Kuyt scored the first goal in the first-leg of the Round of 16 in the UEFA Champions League against favourites Inter Milan in a 2–0 win.

Starting in early 2008, Kuyt began to be employed as a right-winger and set up two of Fernando Torres' goals against West Ham United on 5 March 2008. He adapted to this new role and soon regained his overall form, playing himself into the starting XI again after putting on various vital team performances. On 2 April 2008, Kuyt scored an equalising goal against Arsenal at Emirates Stadium.

On 22 April 2008, in the first-leg of the Champions League all-English semi-final against Chelsea at Anfield, Kuyt scored the opening goal just before half-time.

==== 2008–09 season ====
Kuyt scored a late extra time goal against Standard Liège in the 2008–09 Champions League qualifying match to put Liverpool through to the group stages of the competition. In his next game, a 2–1 win in the Premier League against Manchester United, he assisted fellow countryman Ryan Babel's winning goal.

Kuyt's goals at vital moments in important games, such as the last minute strike against Standard Liège, an injury-time winner against Manchester City on 5 October 2008 and twice in Liverpool's 3–2 comeback win over Wigan Athletic on 18 October 2008, led to his reputation as a "Big Game Player".

The 2008–09 season saw Kuyt score 15 goals, his best return for the club, as they finished runners-up in the Premier League

==== 2009–10 season ====
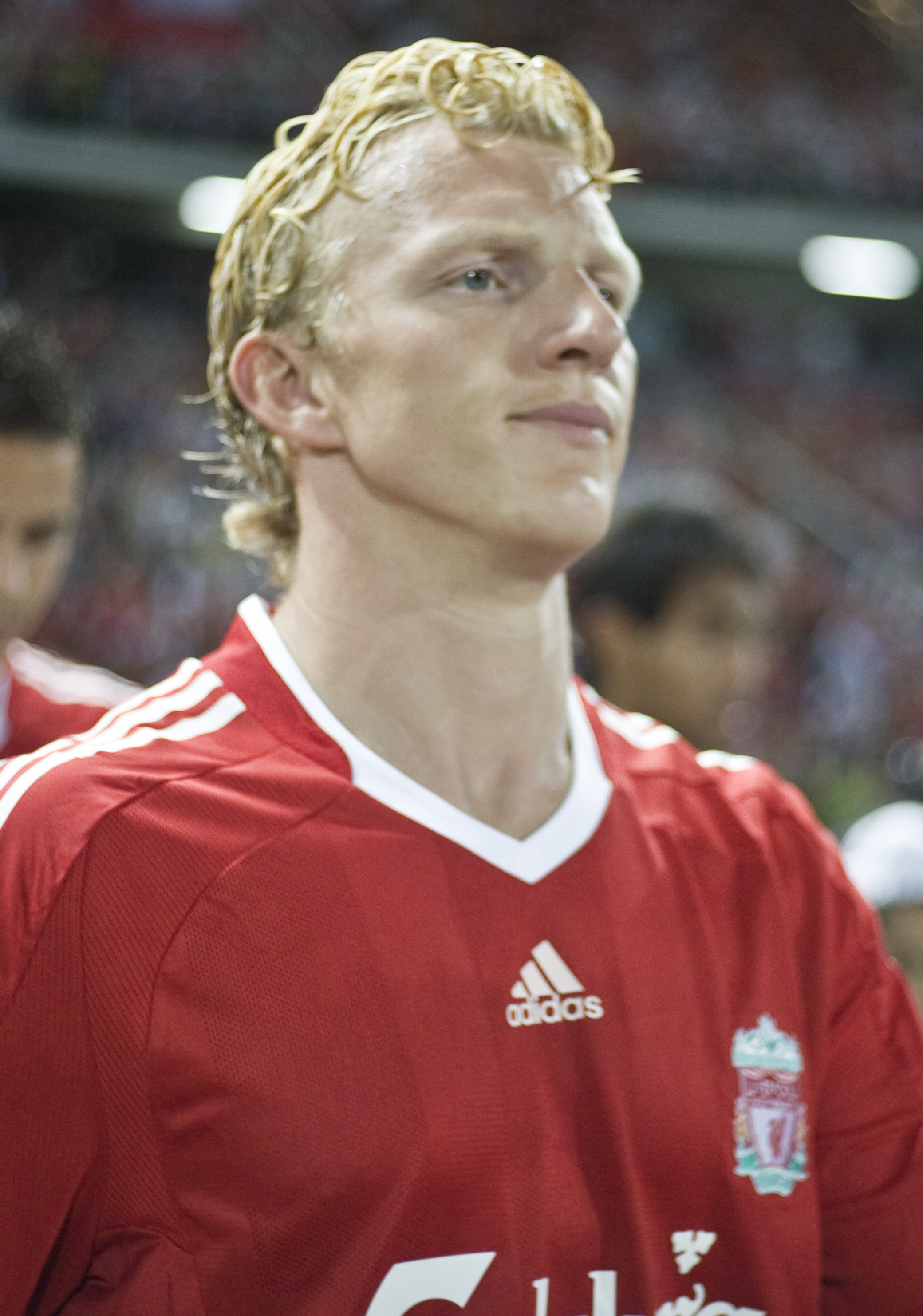
Kuyt with Liverpool in 2009

As a result of heavy injuries sustained by the Liverpool squad, Kuyt often found himself playing a central striker role. He scored against Stoke City and Burnley in two home 4–0 triumphs. He also scored the winning goal in Liverpool's opening Champions League group game against Hungarian team Debrecen in a 1–0 win. Kuyt's goal against Debrecen means only Ian Rush, Steven Gerrard and Mohamed Salah have scored more goals for the club in the European Cup/UEFA Champions League. It was his 12th goal in Europe's premier club competition. Kuyt scored his fourth league goal of the season in a 2–0 win against Everton at Goodison Park, in the Merseyside derby. He took his season's goal tally to six, his fifth in the league, by scoring in a 2–1 Premier League loss to Arsenal at Anfield. On 20 January, Kuyt scored both goals at Anfield against Tottenham Hotspur in a 2–0 victory and a week later, scored the opener against Bolton Wanderers.

On 6 February, Kuyt scored his fourth Merseyside derby goal with a header from a corner against Everton in the 55th minute, bringing his tally of goals for Liverpool to 50 in all competitions. He was also awarded man of the match for this game, which Liverpool won 1–0. On 8 April, he scored his 51st goal for Liverpool with a header in the UEFA Europa League against Benfica. The goal, a header direct from a corner, was originally disallowed by the linesmen for offside, but after some heavy protests by the Liverpool players and manager Rafael Benítez that a player cannot be offside directly from a corner, the referee changed his mind and allowed the goal. Kuyt played in his 200th competitive game for Liverpool, against Hull City on the final day of the season.

==== 2010–11 season ====
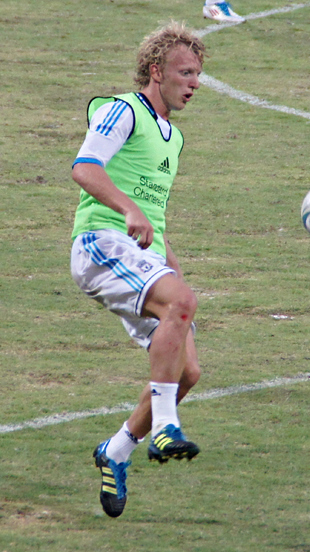
Kuyt during a pre-season training session with Liverpool in 2011

Kuyt featured in Liverpool's opening game of the season against Arsenal at Anfield, the game finishing 1–1 and both teams finishing with ten men. On 23 August, he played in the team's heavy defeat to Manchester City at the City of Manchester Stadium and featured in Liverpool's Europa League qualifier against Trabzonspor, netting the winning goal in a 2–1 win three days later. On 29 August, he played in Liverpool's 1–0 win against West Bromwich Albion at Anfield. An injury to his shoulder during a Netherlands training session forced Kuyt out for a month, but returned a week earlier than expected, celebrating by scoring his second goal of the season against Sunderland at Anfield on 25 September in a 2–2 draw.

Kuyt scored a penalty in Liverpool's 3–0 win against West Ham United. On 16 January 2011, he scored another penalty to draw Liverpool level 2–2 against Everton, after Tim Howard had fouled Maxi Rodríguez. On 24 February, he headed in from a corner against Sparta Prague to put Liverpool through to the last 16 of the Europa League, winning 1–0 on the night at Anfield and 1–0 on aggregate.

On 6 March, Kuyt scored his first Premier League hat-trick for Liverpool in a 3–1 win at Anfield against rivals Manchester United. Kuyt added another goal to his Liverpool tally on 20 March 2011 with a well placed penalty kick against Sunderland, and scored his 11th goal of the season against Manchester City in a 3–0 win. On 15 April, Kuyt signed a contract extension to keep him at the club until the summer of 2013.

On 17 April, Kuyt scored a 102nd-minute penalty kick to seal a late draw against Arsenal after Robin van Persie had scored a penalty in the 98th minute. The match finished 1–1. On 23 April, Kuyt scored a 23-minute goal against Birmingham City after a tussle inside the box, the match ended 5–0 to Liverpool. On 1 May, Kuyt scored a 59-minute penalty kick against Newcastle United for the second goal in a 3–0 win. On 9 May 2011, he became the first Liverpool player since John Aldridge, in over two decades to score in five consecutive games, after his 16th-minute goal against Fulham that led to a 5–2 victory. Kuyt finished the season as Liverpool's top goal scorer scoring 13 league goals, finishing with a total of 15, equalling his best return for the club in a season.

==== 2011–12 season ====
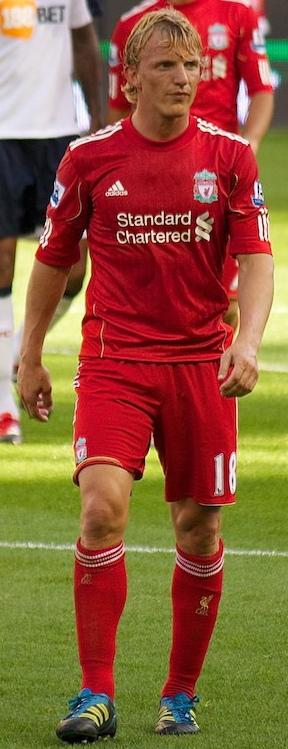
Kuyt playing for Liverpool in 2011

On 21 September 2011, Kuyt scored his first goal of the season in a 2–1 win against Brighton & Hove Albion in the third round of the League Cup. He did not score for the rest of 2011, missing a chance to get his 50th league goal for the club on 1 October 2011 with a saved penalty against Everton, a game Liverpool went on to win 2–0. On 8 October, Kuyt was announced as having taken up an advisory role with his first club in football, Quick Boys. On 28 January 2012, Kuyt scored the winning goal in the 88th minute of a 2–1 victory over Manchester United in the fourth round of the FA Cup. He went on to score his 50th league goal for Liverpool the following week in a 3–0 victory over Wolverhampton Wanderers, becoming only the fifth player to score 50 or more goals for Liverpool in the Premier League.

After coming on as a substitute, Kuyt scored Liverpool's second goal in the 2012 League Cup final against Cardiff City on 26 February 2012; the game finished 2–2 after extra-time, with Liverpool winning after a penalty shoot-out, Kuyt converting his kick.

=== Fenerbahçe ===
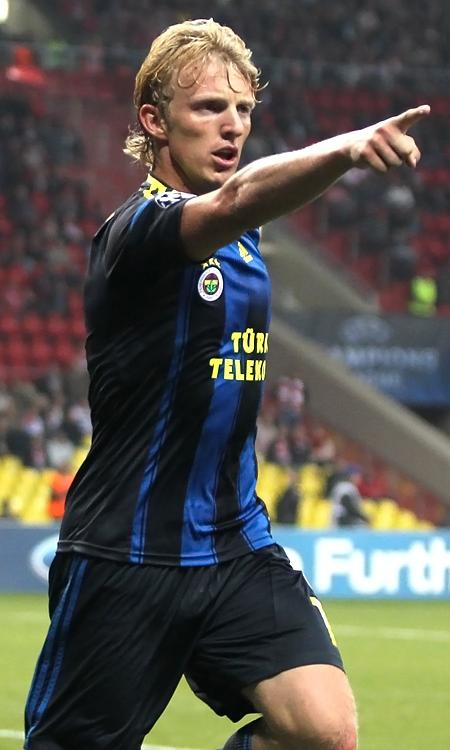
Kuyt playing for Fenerbahçe in 2012

On 3 June 2012, Fenerbahçe declared on its official website that Kuyt had signed with the club on a three-year contract. The transfer fee was €1 million, the release clause in his contract. Kuyt initially earned €2.85 million per season in addition to a match bonus of €17,500.

He scored his first Fenerbahçe goal in a Champions League qualifier against Romanian side Vaslui in a 4–1 win, netting the second and third goals. Kuyt also scored on his league debut at league newcomers Elazigspor on 18 August 2012, as the game ended in a 1–1 draw. In the match against Gaziantepspor, Kuyt scored his 250th goal in his career, including international goals.

=== Return to Feyenoord ===
On 10 April 2015, Kuyt signed a one-year contract to rejoin his former club Feyenoord for the 2015–16 season.

In the 2016–17 season, Kuyt led Feyenoord to their first Eredivisie title since 1999. On the final day of the seasonm on 14 May, he scored a hat-trick to clinch the title. Three days later, on 17 May, Kuyt announced his retirement from professional football.

== International career ==
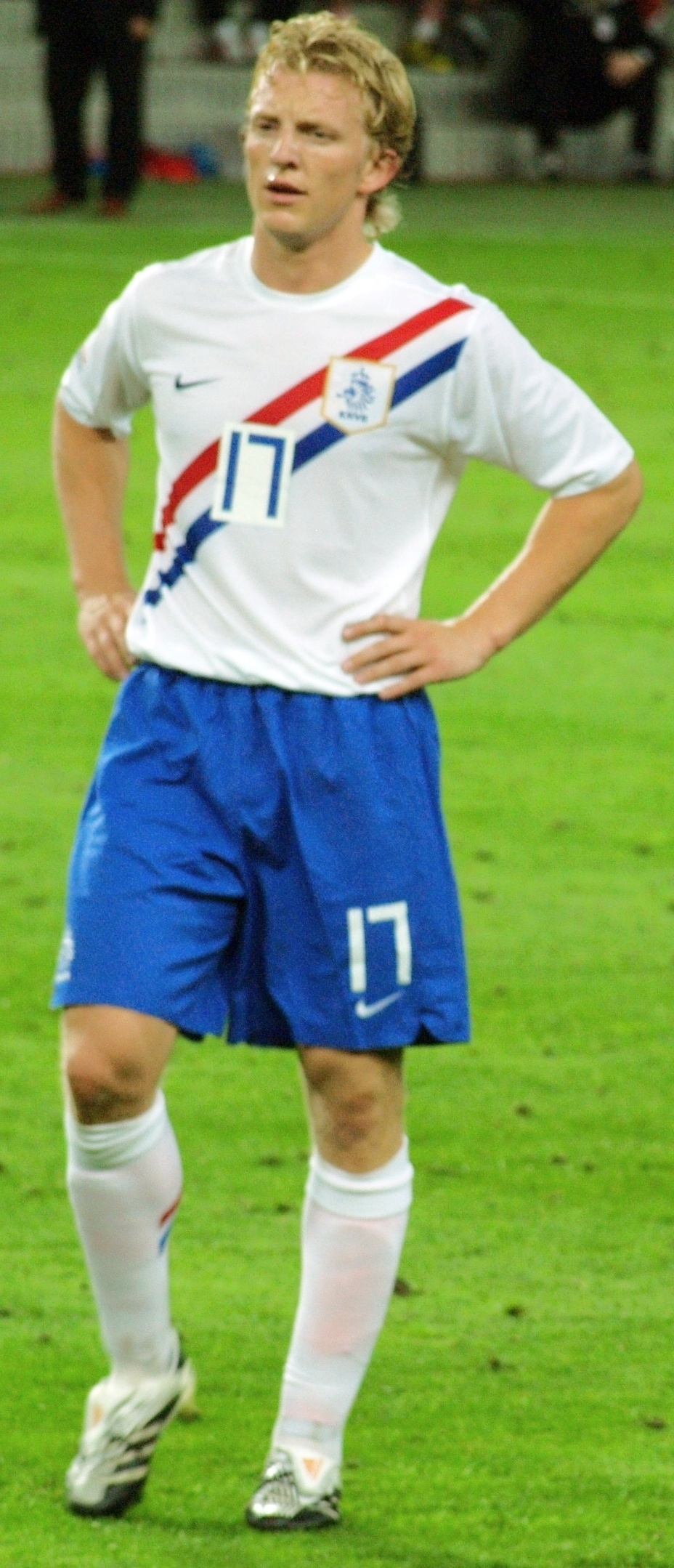
Kuyt playing for the Netherlands in 2007

When Marco van Basten took over as coach of the Dutch national team, he dropped many established players, including strikers Roy Makaay and Patrick Kluivert. Kuyt benefitted as, in September 2004, he made his international debut in Van Basten's first game against Liechtenstein. He became a permanent fixture in the Dutch squad, making the starting line-up for 11 of the Netherlands' 12 2006 FIFA World Cup qualification matches. Kuyt usually wore the number 7 jersey when representing his country, with exception of UEFA Euro 2008, where he wore number 18, the same number he then wore at his club Liverpool.

=== 2006 World Cup ===
At the 2006 World Cup, Kuyt found himself dropped to the substitutes' bench. Although he made an appearance as a 69th-minute replacement in the first match against Serbia and Montenegro, he sat out the entire second game. With the team having already qualified for the next round, Van Basten decided to rest many of his first-choice players for the final group stage match against Argentina, and Kuyt was handed a start in the right wing position.

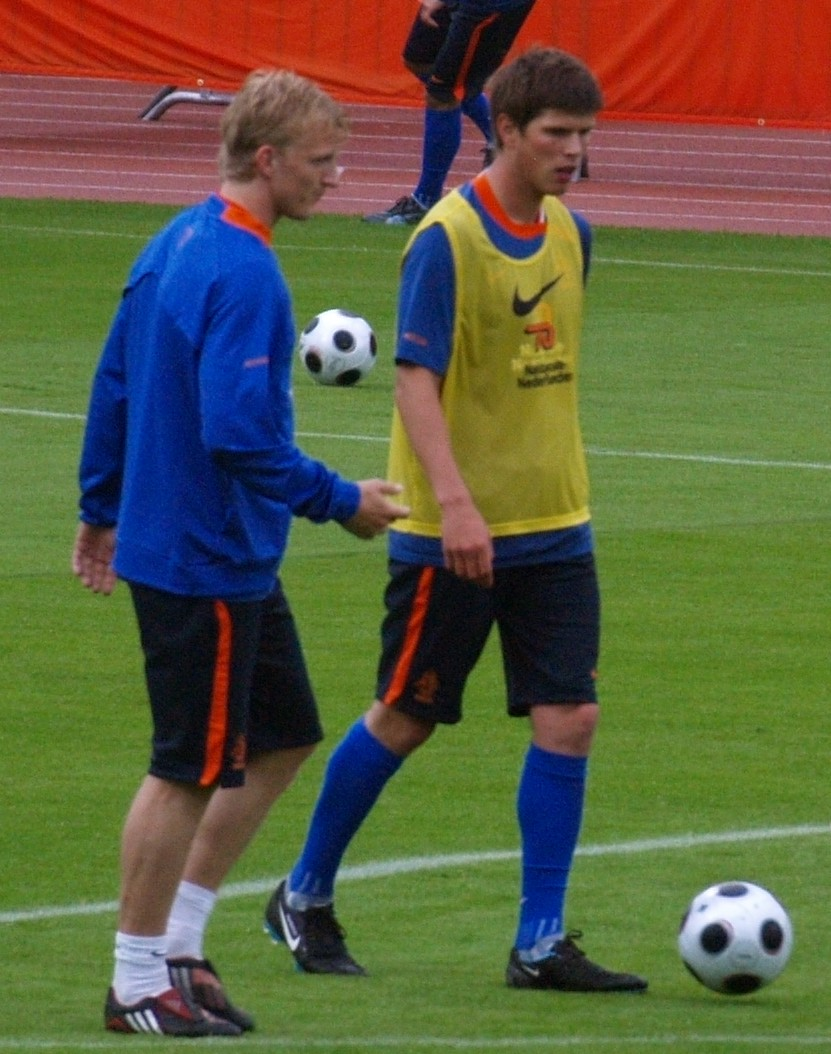
Kuyt (left) with Klaas-Jan Huntelaar in a training session prior to Euro 2008

For the Netherlands' round of 16 tie against Portugal, Kuyt was selected to start ahead of regular first-choice striker Ruud van Nistelrooy. However, Kuyt did not have a good game and the Netherlands eventually lost 1–0 in a game that was more notable for its record breaking disciplinary record (4 red cards and 16 yellow cards).

=== Euro 2008 ===
Kuyt was selected for the Dutch squad for Euro 2008. On 9 June, he played in their opening Group C match, a 3–0 victory over world champions Italy, assisting two goals, his most notable contribution being the header that provided the link between Giovanni van Bronckhorst's cross-field pass and Wesley Sneijder's goal to make the score 2–0 on 31 minutes. On 13 June, Kuyt scored his team's second goal in the next game of Group C, a 4–1 victory over 2006 World Cup finalists France, opening the scoring with a ninth-minute header from a corner, taking his tally of international goals to eight. During Euro 2008, Kuyt was utilised as a winger, partnering Sneijder and Rafael van der Vaart in the midfield due to the team's change of formation from 4–3–3/4–4–2 to 4–2–3–1.

=== 2010 World Cup ===
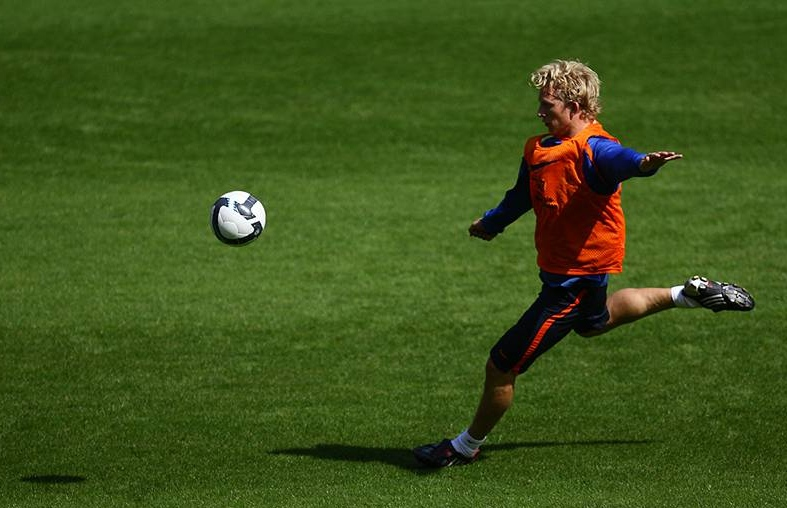
Kuyt prior to a 2010 World Cup qualification match in 2009

Kuyt scored three goals in the 2010 World Cup qualifiers. During a friendly against England, he opened the scoring less than ten minutes after kick-off, pouncing on Rio Ferdinand's poor back pass. Kuyt was included in the Netherlands' preliminary squad for the 2010 World Cup in South Africa. On 27 May 2010, the Netherlands manager Bert van Marwijk announced that the player would be part of the final squad of 23 participating in the competition. At the finals, Kuyt scored the Netherlands' second goal in the 85th minute of their 2–0 win over Denmark in its opening group match, slotting in the rebound after Eljero Elia's shot hit the post. In the quarter-final match on 2 July against Brazil, Kuyt flicked a corner on to Wesley Sneijder, who headed the ball into the net to give the Dutch a 2–1 win. Kuyt also assisted the goal scored by Arjen Robben against Uruguay in the semi-finals. Kuyt started all seven matches for the national team, which finished as runners-up to Spain, and finished the tournament with one goal and three assists.

=== Euro 2012 ===
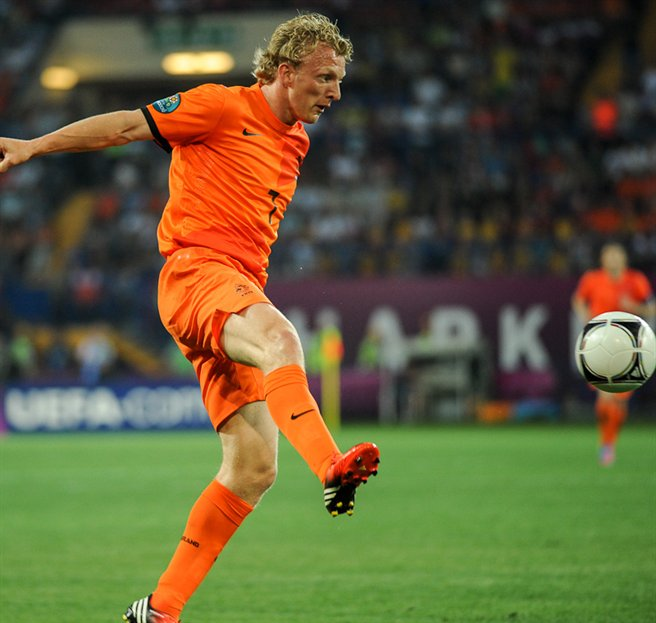
Kuyt playing for the Netherlands at Euro 2012

On 2 September 2010, Kuyt scored a penalty as the Netherlands began its Euro 2012 qualifying campaign with a 5–0 away win against San Marino. On 12 October 2010, Kuyt injured his ankle in the Netherlands' fourth qualifier against Sweden and was out of action for four weeks with the injury. On 25 March 2011, Kuyt scored the Netherlands' third goal in a 4–0 win against Hungary and, four days later, he scored twice in a 5–3 win against the same opponents. Kuyt scored the fourth goal in the Netherlands' record 11–0 win over San Marino. Kuyt headed in his seventh international goal of 2011 in a 3–2 loss against Sweden. Despite being an undisputed starter in the qualifying campaign, Kuyt lost his spot during Euro 2012, with Arjen Robben preferred on the right wing and Ibrahim Affelay on the left. He made two brief appearances as a substitute for Gregory van der Wiel against Denmark in the 85th minute and for Robben against Germany in the 83rd minute.

=== 2014 World Cup ===
After Bert van Marwijk resigned as manager of the Netherlands in June 2012, Kuyt was made vice-captain behind Wesley Sneijder by new coach Louis van Gaal. Despite being vice-captain, he did not feature in any games until the match against Andorra on 12 October replacing Jermain Lens as a substitute in the 71st minute. After Kevin Strootman was substituted off four minutes later, Kuyt took the captain's armband. On 14 November, he played the full 90 minutes in a friendly against Germany as a striker, wearing the captain's armband.

Kuyt won his 100th cap in the Netherlands' round of 16 victory over Mexico on 29 June 2014, making him only the seventh Dutch player to play 100 matches. He was selected to start the match in an unfamiliar left wing-back role by Van Gaal, who also positioned the 33-year-old at wingback and centre forward during the course of the match.

In the quarter-final, Kuyt scored the Netherlands' final kick in a 4–3 penalty shootout win over Costa Rica. In the semi-final, Kuyt scored the Netherlands' fourth kick in a penalty shootout against Argentina, but the Oranje went on to lose the shootout 4–2. In the third place play-off, Kuyt made his last international appearance in a 3–0 victory over Brazil, playing the full 90 minutes in the right wing-back position.

Kuyt retired from international football on 3 October 2014. "I want to be important to the Netherlands team, but the coach explained to me that he no longer has the role for me that I would prefer", Kuyt said on the Dutch FA website, knvb.de. "I'm 34 years old, then you should be honest to yourself. I didn't quite fancy investing a lot of energy in the Oranje for another two years without getting to play much. I look back with great pride on 10 wonderful years with the Dutch national team".

== Managerial career ==
=== ADO Den Haag ===
On 2 June 2022, ADO Den Haag presented Kuyt as their new head coach, with him signing a one-year contract. He was fired on 24 November 2022, after disappointing results which saw the team sitting in 17th after 16 matches.

=== Beerschot ===
On 28 December 2023, Kuyt was appointed as manager of Challenger Pro League (Belgian second division) club Beerschot, signing a contract until the end of the 2023–24 season.

Beerschot clinched promotion to the top division of the Belgian Pro League on 7 April 2024, seeing the Dutch international guide the Antwerp club to the top flight in his first season in charge and champions of Challenger Pro League in 2023–24. However, the club finished last in the following season to be relegated back to the second division. On 20 June 2025, he departed the club.

=== Dordrecht ===
On 27 June 2025, Kuyt became the head coach of Dutch side FC Dordrecht by signing a one-year contract.

=== Fenerbahçe ===
On 18 June 2026, Kuyt was announced as the new assistant manager for Fenerbahçe under İsmail Kartal. On 28 October 2026, following the resignation of İsmail Kartal, he was appointed as interim manager until a new head coach could be named.

On 4 November 2026, he managed Fenerbahçe, to a 3–2 victory over former club Liverpool, in the UEFA Champions League at the Chobani Stadium.

== Personal life ==
Kuyt and Gertrude van Vuuren were together for more than twenty years, married for seventeen of them. They have four children: a daughter, Noëlle, and three sons, Roan Dirk, Jordan Giovanni and Aidan Benyamin. In 2020 the couple separated. In December 2023, Kuyt married Kate Ruinemans.

Kuyt's father, also named Dirk, died of oesophageal cancer on 29 June 2007. Despite undergoing chemotherapy at the Erasmus MC in Rotterdam, his father travelled to Germany to watch Kuyt make his 2006 FIFA World Cup debut; at the 2006 Dutch Footballer of the Year ceremony, Kuyt senior walked to the stage with a drip in his arm to present the award to his son. Seven years after his death, at the 2014 FIFA World Cup, the round-of-sixteen match against Mexico on 29 June simultaneously became Kuyt's 100th international appearance. After Klaas-Jan Huntelaar converted a late penalty to put the Netherlands through, Kuyt walked to the nearest camera and dedicated the win to his father.

Kuyt was raised in a strictly religious household in Katwijk aan Zee, where football on Sundays was not permitted; even when professional clubs expressed interest, his parents declined on his behalf until he turned seventeen and was allowed to decide for himself. He has spoken openly throughout his career about remaining a practising Christian, telling de Volkskrant: "Every week I read the Bible. We say grace before meals and give thanks afterwards. Faith is a good anchor for me when things go well, and also when they go less well". He has noted that he deliberately keeps his faith separate from football outcomes. In 2018, he published an autobiography, Het Geloof in Succes (The Belief in Success), written with journalist Jaap de Groot and published by Nieuw Amsterdam.

In 2005, Kuyt established the Dirk Kuyt Foundation, a charity dedicated to enabling people with physical or intellectual disabilities to participate in sport in the Netherlands. He described the rationale in his own words: "For many of us, sport is a matter of course, but for people with a disability this is unfortunately not the case". By its twentieth year the Foundation had supported and co-organised approximately 175 sporting events across the country. In January 2026, it merged with the Feyenoord Foundation, continuing its activities from De Kuip.

Kuyt's nephew, Jan Plug, is a professional footballer who plays for Feyenoord. Plug, whose mother is Kuyt's younger sister, described the relationship: "Uncle Dirk is my mother's younger brother. We have regular contact, and wherever he can help, he helps me. He has been through everything already."

He currently presents a prank TV show on Dutch TV called Dirk Kuyt's About.

== Career statistics ==
=== Club ===
Appearances and goals by club, season and competition
Club	Season	League			National cup		League cup		Europe		Other		Total	
Club	Season	Division	Apps	Goals	Apps	Goals	Apps	Goals	Apps	Goals	Apps	Goals	Apps	Goals
Quick Boys	1997–98	Hoofdklasse Saturday A	6	3	0	0	—		—		—		6	3
Utrecht	1998–99	Eredivisie	28	5	2	1	—		0	0	—		30	6
Utrecht	1999–2000	Eredivisie	32	6	4	4	—		0	0	—		36	10
Utrecht	2000–01	Eredivisie	32	13	5	3	—		0	0	—		37	16
Utrecht	2001–02	Eredivisie	34	7	3	3	—		4	1	—		41	11
Utrecht	2002–03	Eredivisie	34	20	4	2	—		2	1	—		40	23
Utrecht	Total		160	51	18	13	—		6	2	—		184	66
Feyenoord	2003–04	Eredivisie	34	20	2	1	—		4	1	—		40	22
Feyenoord	2004–05	Eredivisie	34	29	3	4	—		7	3	—		44	36
Feyenoord	2005–06	Eredivisie	33	22	1	0	—		2	1	2 (Note: Appearances in Eredivisie European play-offs)	2	38	25
Feyenoord	Total		101	71	6	5	—		13	5	2	2	122	83
Liverpool	2006–07	Premier League	34	12	1	1	2	0	11	1	—		48	14
Liverpool	2007–08	Premier League	32	3	4	1	0	0	12	7	—		48	11
Liverpool	2008–09	Premier League	38	12	2	0	0	0	11	3	—		51	15
Liverpool	2009–10	Premier League	37	9	2	0	1	0	13	2	—		53	11
Liverpool	2010–11	Premier League	33	13	1	0	0	0	7	2	—		41	15
Liverpool	2011–12	Premier League	34	2	5	1	5	2	—		—		44	5
Liverpool	Total		208	51	16	3	8	2	54	15	—		285	71
Fenerbahçe	2012–13	Süper Lig	31	8	7	1	1	1	17	7	—		56	17
Fenerbahçe	2013–14	Süper Lig	32	10	0	0	1	0	4	0	—		37	10
Fenerbahçe	2014–15	Süper Lig	32	8	4	2	1	0	—		—		37	10
Fenerbahçe	Total		95	26	11	3	3	1	21	7	—		130	37
Feyenoord	2015–16	Eredivisie	32	19	6	4	—		—		—		38	23
Feyenoord	2016–17	Eredivisie	31	12	2	3	—		5	0	1 (Note: Appearance in Johan Cruyff Shield)	0	39	15
Feyenoord	Total		63	31	8	7	—		5	0	1	0	77	38
Quick Boys	2017–18	Derde Divisie Saturday	3	0	—		—		—		—		3	0
Career total			636	233	59	31	11	3	99	29	3	2	807	298

=== International ===
Appearances and goals by national team and year
National team	Year	Apps	Goals
Netherlands	2004	5	1
Netherlands	2005	10	2
Netherlands	2006	12	2
Netherlands	2007	8	1
Netherlands	2008	13	3
Netherlands	2009	11	4
Netherlands	2010	14	4
Netherlands	2011	11	7
Netherlands	2012	8	0
Netherlands	2013	6	0
Netherlands	2014	6	0
Total		104	24

Scores and results list Netherlands' goal tally first.

List of international goals scored by Dirk Kuyt
No.	Date	Venue	Opponent	Score	Result	Competition
1.	9 October 2004	Skopje City Stadium, Skopje, Macedonia	Macedonia	2–1	2–2	2006 FIFA World Cup qualification
2.	4 June 2005	De Kuip, Rotterdam, Netherlands	Romania	2–0	2–0	2006 FIFA World Cup qualification
3.	8 June 2005	Olympic Stadium, Helsinki, Finland	Finland	2–0	4–0	2006 FIFA World Cup qualification
4.	1 March 2006	Amsterdam Arena, Amsterdam, Netherlands	Ecuador	1–0	1–0	Friendly
5.	6 September 2006	Philips Stadion, Eindhoven, Netherlands	Belarus	3–0	3–0	UEFA Euro 2008 qualifying
6.	22 August 2007	Stade de Genève, Geneva, Switzerland	Switzerland	1–2	1–2	Friendly
7.	24 May 2008	De Kuip, Rotterdam, Netherlands	Ukraine	1–0	3–0	Friendly
8.	13 June 2008	Stade de Suisse, Bern, Switzerland	France	1–0	4–1	UEFA Euro 2008
9.	19 November 2008	Amsterdam Arena, Amsterdam, Netherlands	Sweden	3–1	3–1	Friendly
10.	28 March 2009	Amsterdam Arena, Amsterdam, Netherlands	Scotland	3–0	3–0	2010 FIFA World Cup qualification
11.	1 April 2009	Amsterdam Arena, Amsterdam, Netherlands	Macedonia	1–0	4–0	2010 FIFA World Cup qualification
12.	1 April 2009	Amsterdam Arena, Amsterdam, Netherlands	Macedonia	3–0	4–0	2010 FIFA World Cup qualification
13.	12 August 2009	Amsterdam Arena, Amsterdam, Netherlands	England	1–0	2–2	Friendly
14.	3 March 2010	Amsterdam Arena, Amsterdam, Netherlands	United States	1–0	2–1	Friendly
15.	1 June 2010	De Kuip, Rotterdam, Netherlands	Ghana	1–0	4–1	Friendly
16.	14 June 2010	Soccer City, Johannesburg, South Africa	Denmark	2–0	2–0	2010 FIFA World Cup
17.	3 September 2010	Stadio Olimpico, Serravalle, San Marino	San Marino	1–0	5–0	UEFA Euro 2012 qualifying
18.	9 February 2011	Philips Stadion, Eindhoven, Netherlands	Austria	3–0	3–1	Friendly
19.	25 March 2011	Ferenc Puskás Stadium, Budapest, Hungary	Hungary	3–0	4–0	UEFA Euro 2012 qualifying
20.	29 March 2011	Amsterdam Arena, Amsterdam, Netherlands	Hungary	4–3	5–3	UEFA Euro 2012 qualifying
21.	29 March 2011	Amsterdam Arena, Amsterdam, Netherlands	Hungary	5–3	5–3	UEFA Euro 2012 qualifying
22.	8 June 2011	Estadio Centenario, Montevideo, Uruguay	Uruguay	1–0	1–1	Friendly
23.	2 September 2011	Philips Stadion, Eindhoven, Netherlands	San Marino	4–0	11–0	UEFA Euro 2012 qualifying
24.	11 October 2011	Råsunda Stadium, Stockholm, Sweden	Sweden	2–0	2–3	UEFA Euro 2012 qualifying

=== Managerial ===
As of match played 4 November 2026

Team	Nat.	From	To	Record								
Team	Nat.	From	To	M	W	D	L	GF	GA	GD	Win %	Ref.
ADO Den Haag	(Netherlands)	2 June 2022	24 November 2022	17	5	4	8	22	28	−6	29.41	
Beerschot	(Belgium)	28 December 2023	20 June 2025	53	14	12	27	60	88	−28	26.42	
FC Dordrecht	(Netherlands)	30 June 2025	18 June 2026	39	12	11	16	48	63	−15	30.77	
Fenerbahçe (interim)	(Turkey)	28 October 2026	11 November 2026	2	1	0	1	4	4	+0	50.00	
Total				111	32	27	52	134	183	−49	28.83	—

== Honours ==
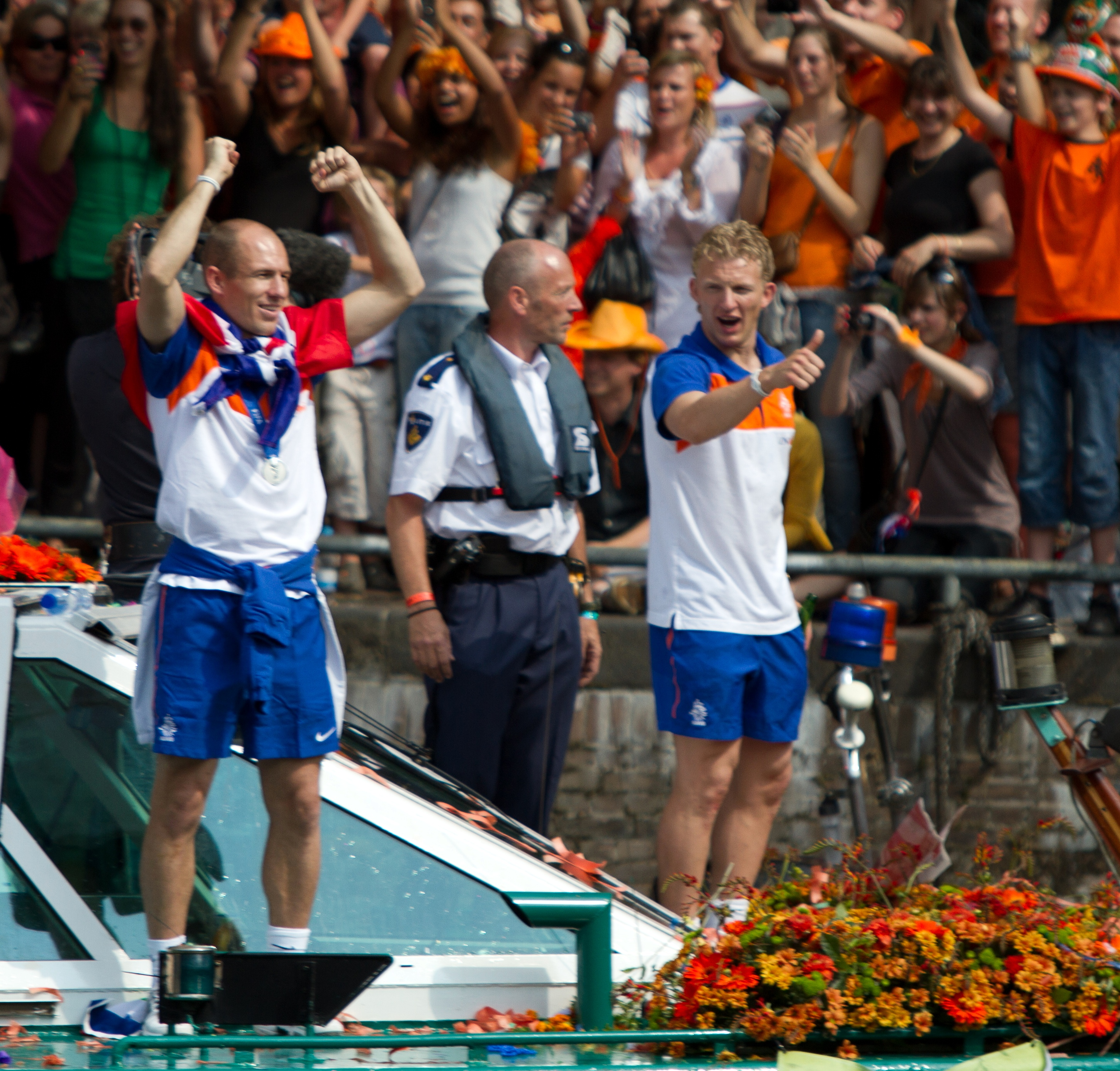
Kuyt with Arjen Robben on a boat in Amsterdam following the 2010 FIFA World Cup

=== Player ===
Utrecht

- KNVB Cup: 2002–03

Liverpool

- Football League Cup: 2011–12
- FA Cup runner-up: 2011–12
- UEFA Champions League runner-up: 2006–07

Fenerbahçe

- Süper Lig: 2013–14
- Turkish Cup: 2012–13
- Turkish Super Cup: 2014

Feyenoord

- Eredivisie: 2016–17
- KNVB Cup: 2015–16

Netherlands

- FIFA World Cup runner-up: 2010; third place: 2014

Individual

- Dutch Golden Shoe: 2003, 2006
- Eredivisie Top Scorer: 2005
- Dutch Footballer of the Year: 2006

=== Manager ===
Beerschot

- Challenger Pro League: 2023–24

== See also ==
- List of footballers with 100 or more caps
