= 2021–22 FC Twente season =

Twente
2021–22 season
- Chairman: Paul van der Kraan
- Head coach: Ron Jans
- Stadium: De Grolsch Veste
- Eredivisie: 4th
- KNVB Cup: Round of 16
- Top goalscorer: League: Ricky van Wolfswinkel (16); All: Ricky van Wolfswinkel (17)
- Highest home attendance: 30,000 (vs. Heracles Almelo, 5 November 2021)
- Lowest home attendance: 0 (all games from mid-November onwards)
- Average home league attendance: 14,300
- Biggest win: 4–1 (vs. Vitesse (a), 19 September 2021)
- Biggest defeat: 2–5 (vs. PSV (a), 30 October 2021)
Home colours	Away colours	Third colours
- All statistics correct as of 15 May 2022.

The 2021–22 season was the 57th season in the existence of FC Twente and the club's third consecutive season in the top flight of Dutch football. In addition to the domestic league, FC Twente participated in this season's edition of the KNVB Cup.

== Players ==
=== First-team squad ===
As of 17 February 2022

Note: Flags indicate national team as defined under FIFA eligibility rules; some limited exceptions apply. Players may hold more than one non-FIFA nationality.

No.	Pos.	Nation	Player
1	GK	GER	Lars Unnerstall
2	DF	NED	Giovanni Troupée
3	DF	NED	Robin Pröpper (vice-captain)
4	DF	ESP	Julio Pleguezuelo
5	DF	NED	Gijs Smal
6	MF	NED	Wout Brama (captain)
7	FW	CZE	Václav Černý
10	FW	NED	Virgil Misidjan
13	FW	NED	Ricky van Wolfswinkel
14	MF	NED	Michel Vlap (on loan from Anderlecht)
15	DF	NED	Kik Pierie (on loan from Ajax)
18	FW	GRE	Dimitrios Limnios (on loan from Köln)
19	MF	ALG	Ramiz Zerrouki

No.	Pos.	Nation	Player
20	DF	NED	Joshua Brenet
22	GK	NED	Jeffrey de Lange
23	MF	CZE	Michal Sadílek (on loan from PSV)
26	FW	NED	Denilho Cleonise
27	FW	CRC	Manfred Ugalde (on loan from Lommel)
30	GK	NED	Ennio van der Gouw
32	MF	NED	Jesse Bosch
35	DF	NED	Mees Hilgers
36	DF	NED	Luca Everink
38	MF	NED	Max Bruns
39	FW	NED	Daan Rots
40	MF	NED	Casper Staring

=== Out on loan ===
Note: Flags indicate national team as defined under FIFA eligibility rules; some limited exceptions apply. Players may hold more than one non-FIFA nationality.

No.	Pos.	Nation	Player
—	DF	NED	Jayden Oosterwolde (on loan at Parma)
—	MF	NED	Thijs van Leeuwen (on loan at Almere City)

No.	Pos.	Nation	Player
—	MF	NED	Godfried Roemeratoe (on loan at Willem II)

== Pre-season and friendlies ==
Win Draw Loss Fixtures

3 July 2021 Friendly	Sparta Enschede (Netherlands)	1–8	(Netherlands) Twente	Enschede, Netherlands
18:00 CEST (UTC+2)				Stadium: Sportpark Schreurserve

6 July 2021 Friendly	HSC '21 (Netherlands)	0–2	(Netherlands) Twente	Haaksbergen, Netherlands
18:30 CEST (UTC+2)				Stadium: Sportpark Groot Scholtenhagen veld 2

10 July 2021 Friendly	Cambuur (Netherlands)	Cancelled	(Netherlands) Twente	Leeuwarden, Netherlands
13:00 CEST (UTC+2)				Stadium: Cambuurstadion

24 July 2021 Friendly	ADO Den Haag (Netherlands)	2–2	(Netherlands) Twente	Den Haag, Netherlands
14:00 CEST (UTC+2)	Besuijen 34'; Steijn 62'		Zerrouki 51', 57'	Stadium: Cars Jeans Stadion

31 July 2021 Friendly	Arminia Bielefeld (Germany)	1–1	(Netherlands) Twente	Bielefeld, Germany
15:30 CEST (UTC+2)	Klos 67'		Van Wolfswinkel 25' (pen.)	Stadium: Bielefelder Alm; Attendance: 3,713

3 August 2021 Friendly	Twente (Netherlands)	0–1	(Italy) Venezia	Enschede, Netherlands
15:00 CEST (UTC+2)			Heymans 65'	Stadium: De Grolsch Veste

7 August 2021 Friendly	Twente (Netherlands)	0–1	(Italy) Lazio	Enschede, Netherlands
19:30 CEST (UTC+2)			Immobile 3'	Stadium: De Grolsch Veste; Referee: Bas Nijhuis

24 March 2022 Friendly	Fortuna Düsseldorf (Germany)	4–0	(Netherlands) Twente	Düsseldorf, Germany
13:00 CET (UTC+1)				Stadium: Paul-Janes-Stadion

== Competitions ==
=== Overall record ===
Competition	First match	Last match	Starting round	Final position	Record							
Competition	First match	Last match	Starting round	Final position	Pld	W	D	L	GF	GA	GD	Win %
Eredivisie	14 August 2021	15 May 2022	Matchday 1	4th	34	20	8	6	55	37	+18	58.82
KNVB Cup	27 October 2021	19 January 2022	First round	Round of 16	3	2	0	1	5	3	+2	66.67
Total					37	22	8	7	60	40	+20	59.46

Last updated: 15 May 2022
Source: Soccerway

=== Eredivisie ===
==== League table ====
Pos	Team	Pld	W	D	L	GF	GA	GD	Pts	Qualification or relegation
2	PSV Eindhoven	34	26	3	5	86	42	+44	81	Qualification for the Champions League third qualifying round
3	Feyenoord	34	22	5	7	76	34	+42	71	Qualification for the Europa League group stage (Note: Since the winners of the 2021–22 KNVB Cup, PSV, qualified for the Champions League based on their league position, the Europa League play-off berth awarded to the KNVB Cup winners was transferred to the third-placed team Feyenoord, the highest-placed team not qualified for the Champions League. Feyenoord qualified for the Europa League group stage as their opponent in the 2022 UEFA Europa Conference League final, Roma, qualified to the Europa League group stage through domestic performance by finishing sixth in the Serie A.)
4	Twente	34	20	8	6	55	37	+18	68	Qualification for the Europa Conference League third qualifying round
5	AZ (O)	34	18	7	9	64	44	+20	61	Qualification for the European competition play-offs
6	Vitesse	34	15	6	13	42	51	−9	51	Qualification for the European competition play-offs

Source: Eredivisie
Rules for classification: Season in progress: 1) Most points won; 2) Less points lost; 3) Goal difference; 4) Goals scored; 5) Alphabetical order; End of season: 1) Points; 2) Goal difference; 3) Goals scored; 4) Head-to-head points; 5) Head-to-head goal difference; 6) Head-to-head away goals scored; 7) Play-off if relevant for deciding champion, relegation or participating in a European league, otherwise by draw. 8) Penalty shoot-out (only after a play-off)
(O) Play-off winners

==== Results summary ====
Overall								Home						Away					
Pld	W	D	L	GF	GA	GD	Pts	W	D	L	GF	GA	GD	W	D	L	GF	GA	GD
34	20	8	6	55	37	+18	68	10	5	2	28	13	+15	10	3	4	27	24	+3

Last updated: 15 May 2022.
Source: Eredivisie

==== Results by round ====
Round	1	2	3	4	5	6	7	8	9	10	11	12	13	14	15	16	17	18	19	20	21	22	23	24	25	26	27	28	29	30	31	32	33	34
Ground	A	H	A	H	A	H	A	A	H	H	A	H	A	H	A	H	A	A	H	A	H	A	H	A	H	A	H	H	A	H	A	H	H	A
Result	L	D	L	W	W	W	W	D	D	L	L	W	W	D	W	W	W	D	W	W	W	L	D	W	W	W	W	D	W	W	D	L	W	W
Position	11	13	15	14	8	6	6	6	8	8	10	7	6	7	6	5	4	6	6	4	4	5	5	5	5	5	4	5	4	4	4	4	4	4

Updated to match(es) played on 15 May 2022. Source: Eredivisie
A = Away; H = Home; W = Win; D = Draw; L = Loss

==== Matches ====
The league fixtures were announced on 11 June 2021.

14 August 2021 1	Fortuna Sittard	2–1	Twente	Sittard
20:00 CEST (UTC+2)	Seuntjens (yellow card) 33', (goal) 60'; Duarte (yellow card) 72'; Lake 80'	Report	van Wolfswinkel (yellow card) 32', (goal) 35'; Menig (yellow card) 80'	Stadium: Fortuna Sittard Stadion; Attendance: 6,300; Referee: Jochem Kamphuis

22 August 2021 2	Twente	1–1	Ajax	Enschede
12:15 CEST (UTC+2)	Menig (yellow card) 10'; Pröpper 87'	Report	Klaassen (yellow card) 17'; Haller 52', (yellow card) 55'	Stadium: De Grolsch Veste; Attendance: 20,000; Referee: Dennis Higler

28 August 2021 3	Cambuur	2–0	Twente	Leeuwarden
18:45 CEST (UTC+2)	Hoedemakers (yellow card) 36'; Jacobs 66', 90+1'	Report	Smal (yellow card) 17'; van Wolfswinkel (yellow card) 42'; Ilić (yellow card) 50' (yellow-red card) 55'	Stadium: Cambuurstadion; Attendance: 6,672; Referee: Kevin Blom

11 September 2021 4	Twente	1–0	FC Utrecht	Enschede
16:30 CEST (UTC+2)	Hilgers (yellow card) 12'; Brama (yellow card) 81'; Limnios (yellow card) 89'; Ugalde (yellow card) 89'; Pröpper 90+1'	Report	Janssen (yellow card) 51'; Warmerdam (yellow card) 74'; Sylla (yellow card) 82'; Maher (yellow card) 89'	Stadium: De Grolsch Veste; Attendance: 20,000; Referee: Serdar Gözübüyük

19 September 2021 5	Vitesse	1–4	Twente	Arnhem
16:45 CEST (UTC+2)	Doekhi (yellow card) 42' (yellow-red card) 85'; Schubert (yellow card) 45+2'; Bero (yellow card) 58'; Darfalou 62'	Report	Pröpper 3', 56'; Brama (yellow card) 18'; Sadílek (yellow card) 39'; van Wolfswinkel 45+1' (pen.); Zerrouki (yellow card) 45+2'; Vlap 60'	Stadium: GelreDome; Attendance: 13,808; Referee: Pol van Boekel

23 September 2021 6	Twente	3–1	AZ	Enschede
21:00 CEST (UTC+2)	van Wolfswinkel 1'; Rots 17'; Pröpper (yellow card) 56'; Limnios 90+1'	Report	Martins Indi (yellow card) 39'; Karlsson 44'; de Wit (yellow card) 51'; Guðmundsson (yellow card) 84'; Chatzidiakos (yellow card) 90'	Stadium: De Grolsch Veste; Attendance: 20,000; Referee: Danny Makkelie

26 September 2021 7	SC Heerenveen	2–3	Twente	Heerenveen
14:30 CEST (UTC+2)	Drešević (yellow card) 9'; J. Veerman (yellow card) 45+3'; Musaba (yellow card) 50'; Pröpper 74' (o.g.); H. Veerman 81'	Report	van Wolfswinkel 10' (pen.); Rots 42'; van Beek 66' (o.g.)	Stadium: Abe Lenstra Stadion; Attendance: 18,500; Referee: Jeroen Manschot

1 October 2021 8	FC Groningen	1–1	Twente	Groningen
20:00 CEST (UTC+2)	Ngonge 8', (yellow card) 72'; van Hintum (yellow card) 49'; El Hankouri (yellow card) 59'	Report	Zerrouki (yellow card) 68'; Ugalde 74', (yellow card) 89'; Everink (yellow card) 79'; Oosterwolde (yellow card) 90+6'	Stadium: Euroborg; Attendance: 16,250; Referee: Martin van de Kerkhof

17 October 2021 9	Twente	1–1	Willem II	Enschede
16:45 CEST (UTC+2)	Limnios 6'; Zerrouki (yellow card) 33' (yellow-red card) 45+3'; Sadílek (yellow card) 40'	Report	Nunnely 24'; Köhn (yellow card) 33' (yellow-red card) 76'; Wriedt (yellow card) 52'	Stadium: De Grolsch Veste; Attendance: 27,000; Referee: Jochem Kamphuis

24 October 2021 10	Twente	1–2	NEC	Enschede
12:15 CEST (UTC+2)	Troupée (yellow card) 39'; Pröpper (yellow card) 49'; Misidjan 58'	Report	Okita (yellow card) 38'; Tavşan 50'; El Karouani (yellow card) 51'; Vet 76', (yellow card) 84'; Odenthal (yellow card) 90+3'	Stadium: De Grolsch Veste; Attendance: 26,000; Referee: Kevin Blom

30 October 2021 11	PSV	5–2	Twente	Eindhoven
16:30 CEST (UTC+2)	Vertessen 14', 54'; Zahavi 27'; Carlos Vinícius 58', 63'	Report	Vlap 13', (yellow card) 42'; Zerrouki 44'	Stadium: Philips Stadion; Attendance: 32,500; Referee: Danny Makkelie

5 November 2021 12	Twente	1–0	Heracles Almelo	Enschede
20:00 CET (UTC+1)	Hilgers 5'; Sadílek (yellow card) 63'; van Wolfswinkel (yellow card) 63'; Rots (yellow card) 78'	Report	Sierhuis (yellow card) 63'; Quagliata (yellow card) 90+1'; Bakış (yellow card) 90+5'	Stadium: De Grolsch Veste; Attendance: 30,000; Referee: Dennis Higler

20 November 2021 13	Sparta Rotterdam	0–1	Twente	Rotterdam
18:45 CET (UTC+1)	Masouras (yellow card) 82'	Report	van Wolfswinkel 83' (pen.); Vlap (yellow card) 89'	Stadium: Sparta Stadion; Attendance: 0 Referee: Edwin van de Graaf

28 November 2021 14	Twente	0–0	Feyenoord	Enschede
14:30 CET (UTC+1)	Zerrouki (yellow card) 43'	Report	Kökçü (yellow card) 90+1'	Stadium: De Grolsch Veste; Attendance: 0 Referee: Dennis Higler

5 December 2021 15	Go Ahead Eagles	1–2	Twente	Deventer
14:30 CET (UTC+1)	Córdoba 39'	Report	Zerrouki (yellow card) 44', (goal) 83'; van Wolfswinkel 79'	Stadium: De Adelaarshorst; Attendance: 0 Referee: Allard Lindhout

12 December 2021 16	Twente	2–1	RKC Waalwijk	Enschede
12:15 CET (UTC+1)	van Wolfswinkel 2'; Vlap 5'	Report	Odgaard 10', (yellow card) 90+4'	Stadium: De Grolsch Veste; Attendance: 0 Referee: Pol van Boekel

18 December 2021 17	PEC Zwolle	1–3	Twente	Zwolle
21:00 CET (UTC+1)	Lagsir 89'	Report	Limnios 15'; Ugalde 39'; Misidjan 52'	Stadium: MAC³PARK Stadion; Attendance: 0 Referee: Alex Bos

22 December 2021 18	FC Utrecht	1–1	Twente	Utrecht
21:00 CET (UTC+1)	van der Maarel (yellow card) 77'; Douvikas (yellow card) 82'; Mahi 90+5'; Timber (yellow card) 90+8'	Report	van Wolfswinkel 17'; Oosterwolde (yellow card) 42'; Sadílek (red card) 51'; Zerrouki (yellow card) 90+7'	Stadium: Galgenwaard Stadion; Attendance: 0 Referee: Richard Martens

15 January 2022 19	Twente	2–0	SC Heerenveen	Enschede
20:00 CET (UTC+1)	Ugalde 77'; van Wolfswinkel 88' (pen.)	Report		Stadium: De Grolsch Veste; Attendance: 0 Referee: Pol van Boekel

22 January 2022 20	Willem II	0–1	Twente	Tilburg
21:00 CET (UTC+1)	Jenssen (yellow card) 78'	Report	Sadílek 39'; Zerrouki (yellow card) 90+3'	Stadium: Koning Willem II Stadion; Attendance: 0 Referee: Edwin van de Graaf

5 February 2022 21	Twente	3–0	Vitesse	Enschede
21:00 CET (UTC+1)	Bosch 18'; van Wolfswinkel 45+1' (pen.), 53'	Report	Doekhi (yellow card) 30'; Rasmussen (red card) 45'	Stadium: De Grolsch Veste; Attendance: 0 Referee: Danny Makkelie

13 February 2022 22	Ajax	5–0	Twente	Amsterdam
16:45 CET (UTC+1)	Klaassen 31'; Tadić (yellow card) 41', (penalty missed) 62'; Haller 53', 85', 88'; Pröpper 77' (o.g.)	Report	Rots (yellow card) 54'	Stadium: Johan Cruyff Arena; Attendance: 17,859; Referee: Allard Lindhout

20 February 2022 23	Twente	2–2	Go Ahead Eagles	Enschede
14:30 CET (UTC+1)	Limnios (yellow card) 54'; Pleguezuelo (yellow card) 64'; Kramer 72' (o.g.); Brenet 89'; van Wolfswinkel (yellow card) 90'	Report	Brouwers (yellow card) 38'; Lidberg 45+1'; Córdoba 48'; Kuipers (yellow card) 81'; Oratmangoen (yellow card) 90'	Stadium: De Grolsch Veste; Attendance: 13,620; Referee: Martin van den Kerkhof

25 February 2022 24	RKC Waalwijk	1–2	Twente	Waalwijk
20:00 CET (UTC+1)	van der Venne (yellow card) 34'; Odgaard 74'; Bel Hassani (yellow card) 86'	Report	van Wolfswinkel 23'; Brenet (yellow card) 44'; Bruns (yellow card) 87'; Limnios 90'	Stadium: Mandemakers Stadion; Attendance: 5,364; Referee: Martin Perez

6 March 2022 25	Twente	1–0	Cambuur	Enschede
14:30 CET (UTC+1)	Pröpper 63'; Brenet (yellow card) 70'; van Wolfswinkel (penalty missed) 78'	Report	ter Heide (yellow card) 16'; Mac-Intosch (yellow card) 25'; Schouten (yellow card) 57'; Paulissen (yellow card) 88'; Tol (yellow card) 90+4'	Stadium: De Grolsch Veste; Attendance: 26,800; Referee: Sander van der Eijk

13 March 2022 26	AZ	0–1	Twente	Alkmaar
20:00 CET (UTC+1)	Koopmeiners (yellow card) 8'; Chatzidiakos (yellow card) 75'	Report	Sadílek (yellow card) 38'; Brenet 62'; Pröpper (yellow card) 78'	Stadium: AFAS Stadion; Attendance: 15,349; Referee: Pol van Boekel

19 March 2022 27	Twente	1–0	PEC Zwolle	Enschede
20:00 CET (UTC+1)	Rots 19'	Report	van den Belt (yellow card) 46'; Paal (yellow card) 53'	Stadium: De Grolsch Veste; Attendance: 28,000; Referee: Edwin van de Graaf

2 April 2022 28	Twente	3–3	PSV	Enschede
18:45 CEST (UTC+2)	van Wolfswinkel 13', 19', (yellow card) 59'; Vlap 25'; Sadílek (yellow card) 42'; Zerrouki (yellow card) 78'	Report	Veerman 35'; Gakpo 53'; Ramalho (yellow card) 59'; Sangaré (yellow card) 71'; Carlos Vinícius (yellow card) 80'; Boscagli 90+3'	Stadium: De Grolsch Veste; Attendance: 30,000; Referee: Serdar Gözübüyük

9 April 2022 29	NEC	0–2	Twente	Nijmegen
21:00 CEST (UTC+2)	Márquez (yellow card) 57'; Akman (red card) 58'	Report	Misidjan 65'; Limnios 75'	Stadium: Goffertstadion; Attendance: 12,390; Referee: Dennis Higler

22 April 2022 30	Twente	2–0	Sparta Rotterdam	Enschede
20:00 CEST (UTC+2)	Van Wolfswinkel 23'; Vlap 57'	Report	Vriends (yellow card) 51'; Verschueren (yellow card) 59'; Masouras (yellow card) 79'	Stadium: De Grolsch Veste; Attendance: 29,100; Referee: Danny Makkelie

30 April 2022 31	Heracles Almelo	1–1	Twente	Almelo
20:00 CEST (UTC+2)	Ouahim (red card) 16'; Fadiga 36', (yellow card) 45+2'; Laursen (yellow card) 41'	Report	Pleguezuelo (yellow card) 40'; Smal 45+3'; Brenet (yellow card) 74'; Van Wolfswinkel (yellow card) 90+5'	Stadium: Erve Asito; Attendance: 7,845; Referee: Sander van der Eijk

7 May 2022 32	Twente	1–2	Fortuna Sittard	Enschede
18:45 CEST (UTC+2)	Van Wolfswinkel 37'; Brenet (yellow card) 40'; Černý (yellow card) 78'; Pröpper (yellow card) 86'	Report	Flemming (yellow card) 5', (goal) 25', 42'; Cox (yellow card) 22'; Gladon (yellow card) 44'; Duarte (yellow card) 73'; Samaris (yellow card) 78'; Seuntjens (yellow card) 90'	Stadium: De Grolsch Veste; Attendance: 29,500; Referee: Jochem Kamphuis

11 May 2022 33	Twente	3–0	FC Groningen	Enschede
20:00 CEST (UTC+2)	Černý 29'; Limnios 68', 81'	Report	Te Wierik (yellow card) 90+4'	Stadium: De Grolsch Veste; Attendance: 29,100; Referee: Martin van den Kerkhof

15 May 2022 34	Feyenoord	1–2	Twente	Rotterdam
14:30 CEST (UTC+2)	Dessers 68'; Toornstra (yellow card) 74'; Geertruida (yellow card) 90+2'; Pedersen (yellow card) 90+6'	Report	Limnios 27'; Smal 37'; Zerrouki (yellow card) 66'; Pleguezuelo (yellow card) 71'	Stadium: De Kuip; Attendance: 47,500; Referee: Jeroen Manschot

=== KNVB Cup ===
27 October 2021 First round	OSS '20	0–2	Twente	Oss
18:45 CEST (UTC+2)	van der Velden (yellow card) 18'; Zonnenberg (yellow card) 36'; van de Rande (yellow card) 86'; Engelen (yellow card) 89'	Report	Zerrouki 15', 90+3'; Staring (yellow card) 79'	Stadium: Frans Heesen Stadion; Attendance: 4,700; Referee: Martin Perez

15 December 2021 Second round	Twente	2–1 (a.e.t.)	Feyenoord	Enschede
18:00 CET (UTC+1)	Troupée 79'; Ugalde 114', (yellow card) 119'; Pröpper (yellow card) 117'	Report	Dessers 47'	Stadium: De Grolsch Veste; Attendance: 0 Referee: Serdar Gözübüyük

19 January 2022 Round of 16	Twente	1–2	AZ	Enschede
21:00 CET (UTC+1)	van Wolfswinkel 48' (pen.); Sadílek (yellow card) 89'	Report	Vindahl (yellow card) 48'; Pleguezuelo 63' (o.g.); Pavlidis 82'; Sugawara (yellow card) 90'	Stadium: De Grolsch Veste; Attendance: 0 Referee: Serdar Gözübüyük
