= 2020–21 FC Twente season =

FC Twente
2020–21 season
- Chairman: René Takens
- Head coach: Ron Jans
- Stadium: De Grolsch Veste
- Eredivisie: 10th
- KNVB Cup: First round
- Top goalscorer: League: Danilo (17); All: Danilo (17)
| Home colours | Away colours | Third colours |

The 2020–21 FC Twente season was the club's 56th season in existence and second consecutive season in the top flight of Dutch football. In addition to the domestic league, FC Twente participated in this season's edition of the KNVB Cup. The season covered the period from 1 July 2020 to 30 June 2021.

== Players ==
=== First-team squad ===
Note: Flags indicate national team as defined under FIFA eligibility rules; some limited exceptions apply. Players may hold more than one non-FIFA nationality.

| No. | Pos. | Nation | Player |
|---|---|---|---|
| 4 | DF | ESP | Julio Pleguezuelo |
| 5 | DF | NED | Gijs Smal |
| 6 | MF | NED | Wout Brama (captain) |
| 7 | FW | CZE | Václav Černý (on loan from Utrecht) |
| 8 | MF | SRB | Luka Ilić (on loan from Manchester City) |
| 9 | FW | BRA | Danilo (on loan from Ajax) |
| 10 | FW | GHA | Abass Issah (on loan from Mainz 05) |
| 11 | FW | NED | Queensy Menig |
| 15 | DF | NED | Kik Pierie (on loan from Ajax) |
| 16 | GK | NED | Joël Drommel |
| 17 | DF | NED | Jayden Oosterwolde |
| 19 | MF | NED | Ramiz Zerrouki |

| No. | Pos. | Nation | Player |
|---|---|---|---|
| 20 | MF | NED | Godfried Roemeratoe |
| 22 | GK | NED | Jeffrey de Lange |
| 23 | DF | NGR | Tyronne Ebuehi (on loan from Benfica) |
| 24 | DF | NED | Nathangelo Markelo (on loan from Everton) |
| 25 | FW | NED | Luciano Narsingh (on loan from Feyenoord) |
| 30 | GK | NED | Ennio van der Gouw |
| 32 | MF | NED | Jesse Bosch |
| 35 | DF | NED | Mees Hilgers |
| 37 | MF | NED | Thijs van Leeuwen |
| 40 | MF | NED | Casper Staring |
| 43 | DF | BIH | Dario Đumić |
| — | MF | NED | Max Bruns |
| — | FW | NED | Daan Rots |

=== Out on loan ===
Note: Flags indicate national team as defined under FIFA eligibility rules; some limited exceptions apply. Players may hold more than one non-FIFA nationality.

| No. | Pos. | Nation | Player |
|---|---|---|---|
| 18 | MF | ALB | Lindon Selahi (at Willem II until 30 June 2021) |

== Transfers ==
=== Transfers in ===
| Date | Pos. | Name | Transferred from | Fee | Ref. |
|---|---|---|---|---|---|
| 1 July 2020 | DF | (Netherlands) Gijs Smal | (Netherlands) FC Volendam | Free transfer | |
| 13 July 2020 | FW | (Czech Republic) Václav Černý | (Netherlands) FC Utrecht | Loan | |
| 16 July 2020 | DF | (Netherlands) Kik Pierie | (Netherlands) Ajax | Loan | |
| 20 July 2020 | DF | (Netherlands) Jayden Oosterwolde | (Netherlands) FC Twente / Heracles Academie | Free transfer | |
| 27 July 2020 | DF | (Netherlands) Nathangelo Markelo | (England) Everton | Loan | |
| 31 July 2020 | FW | (Greece) Lazaros Lamprou | (Greece) PAOK | Loan | |
| 3 August 2020 | FW | (Sweden) Alexander Jeremejeff | (Germany) Dynamo Dresden | Loan | |
| 20 August 2020 | FW | (Brazil) Danilo | (Netherlands) Ajax | Loan | |
| 21 August 2020 | DF | (Nigeria) Tyronne Ebuehi | (Portugal) Benfica | Loan | |
| 4 September 2020 | DF | (Bosnia and Herzegovina) Dario Đumić | (Netherlands) FC Utrecht | Undisclosed | |
| 5 October 2020 | MF | (Serbia) Luka Ilić | (England) Manchester City | Loan | |
| 6 October 2020 | FW | (Turkey) Halil Dervişoğlu | (England) Brentford | Loan | |

=== Out ===
| No. | Pos | Player | Transferred to | Fee | Date | Source |
|---|---|---|---|---|---|---|
| 15 | | | TBD | | 1 July 2020 | |

== Pre-season and friendlies ==
Win Draw Loss

| 7 August 2020 Friendly | Twente (Netherlands) | 3–1 | (Netherlands) Excelsior '31 | Enschede, Netherlands |
| 19:00 CEST (UTC+2) | Pleguezuelo 36'; Aburjania 60'; Lamprou 75' | Report | Ezafzafi 55' | Stadium: De Grolsch Veste; Attendance: 0 |

| 10 August 2020 Friendly | Twente (Netherlands) | 2–1 | (Netherlands) Fortuna Sittard | Enschede, Netherlands |
| 18:45 CEST (UTC+2) | Aburjania 49'; Rots 57' | Report | Angha 76' | Stadium: De Grolsch Veste; Attendance: 3,025; Referee: Jochem Kamphuis |

| 16 August 2020 Friendly | Feyenoord (Netherlands) | 0–0 | (Netherlands) Twente | Rotterdam, Netherlands |
| 14:30 CEST (UTC+2) | | Report | | Stadium: De Kuip; Referee: Siemen Mulder |

| 22 August 2020 Friendly | Twente (Netherlands) | 2–0 | (Netherlands) Go Ahead Eagles | Enschede, Netherlands |
| 18:00 CEST (UTC+2) | Bosch 32'; Seppenwoolde 86' | Report | | Stadium: De Grolsch Veste; Attendance: 3,650; Referee: Bas Nijhuis |

| 5 September 2020 Friendly | Twente (Netherlands) | 1–1 | (Netherlands) FC Emmen | Enschede, Netherlands |
| 19:00 CEST (UTC+2) | Černý 57' | Report | Kolar 26' | Stadium: De Grolsch Veste; Attendance: 3,600; Referee: Jeroen Manschot |

== Competitions ==
=== Overview ===
| Competition | First match | Last match | Starting round | Final position | Record | | | | | | | |
| Competition | First match | Last match | Starting round | Final position | Pld | W | D | L | GF | GA | GD | Win % |
|---|---|---|---|---|---|---|---|---|---|---|---|---|
| Eredivisie | 12 September 2020 | 16 May 2021 | Matchday 1 | 10th | 34 | 10 | 11 | 13 | 48 | 50 | −2 | 29.41 |
| KNVB Cup | 27 October 2020 | | First round | First round | 1 | 0 | 0 | 1 | 1 | 3 | −2 | 0.00 |
| Total | | | | | 35 | 10 | 11 | 14 | 49 | 53 | −4 | 28.57 |

Source: Soccerway

=== Eredivisie ===
==== League table ====
| Pos | Team | Pld | W | D | L | GF | GA | GD | Pts | Qualification or relegation |
|---|---|---|---|---|---|---|---|---|---|---|
| 8 | Sparta Rotterdam | 34 | 13 | 8 | 13 | 49 | 48 | +1 | 47 | Qualification for the European competition play-offs (Note: Winner of play-off will qualify to Europa Conference League second qualifying round.) |
| 9 | Heracles Almelo | 34 | 12 | 8 | 14 | 42 | 53 | −11 | 44 | |
| 10 | Twente | 34 | 10 | 11 | 13 | 48 | 50 | −2 | 41 | |
| 11 | Fortuna Sittard | 34 | 12 | 5 | 17 | 50 | 58 | −8 | 41 | |
| 12 | Heerenveen | 34 | 9 | 12 | 13 | 43 | 49 | −6 | 39 | |

Source: Eredivisie, Soccerway
Rules for classification: Season in progress: 1) Most points won; 2) Less points lost; 3) Goal difference; 4) Goals scored; 5) Alphabetical order; End of season: 1) Points; 2) Goal difference; 3) Goals scored; 4) Head-to-head points; 5) Head-to-head goal difference; 6) Head-to-head away goals scored; 7) Play-off if relevant for deciding champion, relegation or participating in a European league, otherwise by draw. 8) Penalty shoot-out (only after a play-off)

==== Results summary ====
| Overall | | | | | | | | Home | | | | | | Away | | | | | |
| Pld | W | D | L | GF | GA | GD | Pts | W | D | L | GF | GA | GD | W | D | L | GF | GA | GD |
|---|---|---|---|---|---|---|---|---|---|---|---|---|---|---|---|---|---|---|---|
| 34 | 10 | 11 | 13 | 48 | 50 | −2 | 41 | 4 | 6 | 7 | 23 | 25 | −2 | 6 | 5 | 6 | 25 | 25 | 0 |

Source: Eredivisie

==== Results by round ====
| Round | 1 | 2 | 3 | 4 | 5 | 6 | 7 | 8 | 9 | 10 | 11 | 12 | 13 | 14 | 15 | 16 | 17 | 18 | 19 | 20 | 21 | 22 | 23 | 24 | 25 | 26 | 27 | 28 | 29 | 30 | 31 | 32 | 33 | 34 |
|---|---|---|---|---|---|---|---|---|---|---|---|---|---|---|---|---|---|---|---|---|---|---|---|---|---|---|---|---|---|---|---|---|---|---|
| Ground | H | A | H | H | A | A | H | A | H | H | A | H | A | H | A | H | A | H | A | H | A | A | H | A | H | A | A | H | A | H | A | H | A | H |
| Result | W | D | W | D | W | L | W | W | D | L | W | L | W | L | W | L | D | L | D | D | L | W | D | D | D | L | D | L | L | L | L | D | L | W |
| Position | 3 | 6 | 4 | 6 | 5 | 6 | 6 | 5 | 5 | 5 | 5 | 7 | 7 | 7 | 6 | 7 | 7 | 7 | 7 | 7 | 7 | 7 | 8 | 7 | 8 | 8 | 8 | 9 | 9 | 9 | 12 | 12 | 12 | 10 |

Source: Eredivisie
A = Away; H = Home; W = Win; D = Draw; L = Loss

==== Matches ====
The league fixtures were announced on 24 July 2020.

| 12 September 2020 1 | Twente | 2–0 | Fortuna Sittard | Enschede |
| 21:00 CEST (UTC+2) | Menig 10', (yellow card) 67'; Danilo 51' (pen.) | Report | | Stadium: De Grolsch Veste; Attendance: 8,000; Referee: Allard Lindhout |

| 20 September 2020 2 | Feyenoord | 1–1 | Twente | Rotterdam |
| 14:30 CEST (UTC+2) | Linssen (yellow card) 26'; Berghuis 29' (pen.); Senesi (yellow card) 48' | Report | Černý 2'; Zerrouki (yellow card) 18'; Oosterwolde (yellow card) 28' | Stadium: De Kuip; Attendance: 13,000; Referee: Pol van Boekel |

| 25 September 2020 3 | Twente | 3–1 | FC Groningen | Enschede |
| 20:00 CEST (UTC+2) | Černý 22'; Danilo 37'; Jeremejeff 88' | Report | Van Hintum (yellow card) 42'; El Messaoudi 52' | Stadium: De Grolsch Veste; Attendance: 8,000; Referee: Sander van der Eijk |

| 3 October 2020 4 | Twente | 1–1 | FC Emmen | Enschede |
| 21:00 CEST (UTC+2) | Černý (yellow card) 45+1' (goal) 48' | Report | Bakker (yellow card) 20'; De Leeuw 65' | Stadium: De Grolsch Veste; Attendance: 0 Referee: Siemen Mulder |

| 17 October 2020 5 | Willem II | 0–3 | Twente | Tilburg |
| 20:00 CEST (UTC+2) | Holmén (yellow card) 45+2'; Sağlam (yellow card) 64'; Nelom (yellow card) 70' | Report | Danilo 2', 62'; Oosterwolde 48'; Lamprou (yellow card) 83' | Stadium: Koning Willem II Stadion; Attendance: 0 Referee: Dennis Higler |

| 24 October 2020 6 | FC Utrecht | 2–1 | Twente | Utrecht |
| 18:45 CEST (UTC+2) | Van der Maarel (yellow card) 27'; Ramselaar 43'; Van de Streek 47' | Report | Danilo 1'; Oosterwolde (yellow card) 18'; Ebuehi (yellow card) 32'; Bosch (yellow card) 55'; Pleguezuelo (yellow card) 57' | Stadium: Stadion Galgenwaard; Attendance: 0 Referee: Kevin Blom |

| 31 October 2020 7 | Twente | 5–1 | PEC Zwolle | Enschede |
| 18:45 CET (UTC+1) | Menig 5'; Danilo 29'; Brama 33'; Pierie (yellow card) 47'; Černý 51'; Ilić 84' | Report | Reijnders 74' | Stadium: De Grolsch Veste; Attendance: 0 Referee: Serdar Gözübüyük |

| 7 November 2020 8 | ADO Den Haag | 2–4 | Twente | The Hague |
| 16:30 CET (UTC+1) | Pleguezuelo 76' (o.g.); Bourard 86' | Report | Menig 41'; Danilo 59', 88'; Oosterwolde (yellow card) 80'; Van Leeuwen 90+4' | Stadium: Cars Jeans Stadion; Attendance: 0 Referee: Rob Dieperink |

| 22 November 2020 9 | Twente | 1–1 | PSV | Enschede |
| 16:45 CET (UTC+1) | Danilo 63' (pen.); Pleguezuelo (yellow card) 68' | Report | Malen 8'; Zahavi (penalty missed) 44'; Madueke (yellow card) 57'; Gakpo (yellow card) 62' | Stadium: De Grolsch Veste; Attendance: 0 Referee: Pol van Boekel |

| 27 November 2020 10 | Twente | 0–2 | RKC Waalwijk | Enschede |
| 20:00 CET (UTC+1) | Pleguezuelo (yellow card) 63'; Zerrouki (yellow card) 67'; Pierie (yellow card) 76'; Černý (yellow card) 90+4' | Report | Ngonge 22'; Stokkers 30' | Stadium: De Grolsch Veste; Attendance: 0 Referee: Richard Martens |

| 5 December 2020 11 | Ajax | 1–2 | Twente | Amsterdam |
| 20:00 CET (UTC+1) | Tadić 59' (pen.); Gravenberch (yellow card) 83' | Report | Menig 22', 84' | Stadium: Johan Cruyff Arena; Attendance: 0 Referee: Allard Lindhout |

| 13 December 2020 12 | Twente | 1–3 | AZ | Enschede |
| 20:00 CET (UTC+1) | Drommel (yellow card) 33'; Danilo 73' (pen.), (yellow card) 90+2'; Oosterwolde (red card) 88' | Report | Koopmeiners 34' (pen.), 90'; Sugawara 43' | Stadium: De Grolsch Veste; Attendance: 0 Referee: Danny Makkelie |

| 19 December 2020 13 | VVV-Venlo | 1–2 | Twente | Venlo |
| 18:45 CET (UTC+1) | Linthorst 70'; Schmitz (yellow card) 75'; Van Crooij (yellow card) 78' | Report | Danilo 27', (yellow card) 85'; Ilić (yellow card) 40', (goal) 63' | Stadium: De Koel; Attendance: 0 Referee: Serdar Gözübüyük |

| 22 December 2020 14 | Twente | 0–2 | Sparta Rotterdam | Enschede |
| 21:00 CET (UTC+1) | Pierie (yellow card) 82' | Report | Engels 45+1'; Duarte 63' | Stadium: De Grolsch Veste; Attendance: 0 Referee: Martin Van Den Kerkhof |

| 9 January 2021 15 | FC Emmen | 1–4 | Twente | Emmen |
| 18:45 CET (UTC+1) | Araujo 59' | Report | Černý 16', 63'; Menig 33'; Bosch 42', (yellow card) 66' | Stadium: De Oude Meerdijk; Attendance: 0 Referee: Allard Lindhout |

| 14 January 2021 16 | Twente | 1–3 | Ajax | Enschede |
| 20:00 CET (UTC+1) | Rots (yellow card) 81'; Pleguezuelo 84' | Report | Haller 7'; Huntelaar 90', 90+1' | Stadium: De Grolsch Veste; Attendance: 0 Referee: Pol van Boekel |

| 17 January 2021 17 | FC Groningen | 2–2 | Twente | Groningen |
| 14:30 CET (UTC+1) | El Messaoudi 47'; Schreck (yellow card) 64'; Larsen 66' | Report | Đumić 12'; Van Leeuwen 22', (yellow card) 53'; Abass (yellow card) 78' | Stadium: Euroborg; Attendance: 0 Referee: Kevin Blom |

| 24 January 2021 18 | Twente | 0–1 | VVV-Venlo | Enschede |
| 14:30 CET (UTC+1) | Zerrouki (yellow card) 43'; Danilo (yellow card) 77' | Report | Van Crooij (yellow card) 69'; Hunte 78' | Stadium: De Grolsch Veste; Attendance: 0 Referee: Martin van den Kerkhof |

| 28 January 2021 19 | Sparta Rotterdam | 0–0 | Twente | Rotterdam |
| 18:45 CET (UTC+1) | Abels (yellow card) 90+3' | Report | | Stadium: Het Kasteel; Attendance: 0 Referee: Edwin van de Graaf |

| 31 January 2021 20 | Twente | 0–0 | SC Heerenveen | Enschede |
| 12:15 CET (UTC+1) | Roemeratoe (yellow card) 33'; Menig (yellow card) 88' | Report | Kongolo (yellow card) 90+2' | Stadium: De Grolsch Veste; Attendance: 0 Referee: Jeroen Manschot |

| 6 February 2021 21 | PSV | 3–0 | Twente | Eindhoven |
| 16:30 CET (UTC+1) | Malen 30', 53'; Zahavi 36' | Report | Ilić (red card) 75' | Stadium: Philips Stadion; Attendance: 0 Referee: Siemen Mulder |

| 14 February 2021 22 | Vitesse | 0–2 | Twente | Arnhem |
| 16:45 CET (UTC+1) | Tronstad (yellow card) 40' | Report | Menig 16'; Bosch (yellow card) 56'; Van Leeuwen 90+4' | Stadium: GelreDome; Attendance: 0 Referee: Sander van der Eijk |

| 21 February 2021 23 | Twente | 2–2 | Feyenoord | Enschede |
| 12:15 CET (UTC+1) | Oosterwolde (yellow card) 10'; Danilo 13' (pen.); Ebuehi 14' | Report | Toornstra 24'; Spajić (yellow card) 56'; Berghuis 67' (pen.); Senesi (yellow card) 90' | Stadium: De Grolsch Veste; Attendance: 0 Referee: Danny Makkelie |

| 27 February 2021 24 | Heracles Almelo | 2–2 | Twente | Almelo |
| 21:00 CET (UTC+1) | Azzaoui 6'; Vloet 47' | Report | Menig 13'; Danilo 50' | Stadium: Erve Asito; Attendance: 0 Referee: Dennis Higler |

| 6 March 2021 25 | Twente | 1–1 | Willem II | Enschede |
| 18:45 CET (UTC+1) | Roemeratoe (yellow card) 40'; Bosch 64', (yellow card) 89' | Report | Pavlidis 81' | Stadium: De Grolsch Veste; Attendance: 0 Referee: Serdar Gözübüyük |

| 13 March 2021 26 | AZ | 4–1 | Twente | Alkmaar |
| 20:00 CET (UTC+1) | Boadu 4'; Đumić 22' (o.g.); Drommel 34' (o.g.); Martins Indi (yellow card) 43'; Koopmeiners 78' | Report | Đumić (yellow card) 36'; Guðmundsson 40' (o.g.); Zerrouki (yellow card) 57' | Stadium: AFAS Stadion; Attendance: 0 Referee: Kevin Blom |

| 19 March 2021 27 | SC Heerenveen | 0–0 | Twente | Heerenveen |
| 20:00 CET (UTC+1) | Bochniewicz (yellow card) 71' | Report | Markelo (yellow card) 90' | Stadium: Abe Lenstra Stadion; Attendance: 0 Referee: Martin van den Kerkhof |

| 3 April 2021 28 | Twente | 1–2 | Vitesse | Enschede |
| 20:00 CEST (UTC+2) | Đumić (yellow card) 4'; Danilo 20' (pen.); Roemeratoe (yellow card) 88' | Report | Tannane 44' (pen.), 90+5' (pen.); Broja (yellow card) 88' | Stadium: De Grolsch Veste; Attendance: 0 Referee: Pol van Boekel |

| 10 April 2021 29 | PEC Zwolle | 1–0 | Twente | Zwolle |
| 21:00 CEST (UTC+2) | Misidjan 35' | Report | | Stadium: MAC³PARK Stadion; Attendance: 0 Referee: Richard Martens |

| 25 April 2021 30 | Twente | 1–2 | FC Utrecht | Enschede |
| 16:45 CEST (UTC+2) | Danilo 28'; Drommel (yellow card) 59'; Pierie (yellow card) 61'; Oosterwolde (yellow card) 61' | Report | Elia (yellow card) 21'; Van de Streek 49', (penalty missed) 60'; Kerk 55'; Janssen (yellow card) 62'; Van der Maarel (yellow card) 80' | Stadium: De Grolsch Veste; Attendance: 4,000; Referee: Kevin Blom |

| 1 May 2021 31 | Fortuna Sittard | 3–0 | Twente | Sittard |
| 18:45 CEST (UTC+2) | Semedo 25', 74'; Seuntjens 63' (pen.) | Report | Brama (yellow card) 62'; Markelo (yellow card) 90' | Stadium: Fortuna Sittard Stadion; Attendance: 0 Referee: Laurens Gerrets |

| 8 May 2021 32 | Twente | 1–1 | Heracles Almelo | Enschede |
| 16:30 CEST (UTC+2) | Smal (yellow card) 52'; Bosch (yellow card) 73'; Danilo 85' | Report | Knoester 70'; Burgzorg (yellow card) 79' | Stadium: De Grolsch Veste; Attendance: 0 Referee: Allard Lindhout |

| 13 May 2021 33 | RKC Waalwijk | 2–1 | Twente | Waalwijk |
| 14:30 CEST (UTC+2) | Sow 48', 54'; Oosting (yellow card) 69'; Touba (yellow card) 90+4' | Report | Danilo 47', (red card) 88'; Drommel (yellow card) 88' | Stadium: Mandemakers Stadion; Attendance: 0 Referee: Martin van den Kerkhof |

| 16 May 2021 34 | Twente | 3–2 | ADO Den Haag | Enschede |
| 14:30 CEST (UTC+2) | Rots 40'; Narsingh 45+1' (pen.); Menig (yellow card) 51'; Bosch (yellow card) 71'; Đumić 84' | Report | Goossens 30', 38'; Vejinović (yellow card) 88' | Stadium: De Grolsch Veste; Attendance: 0 Referee: Dennis Higler |

=== KNVB Cup ===
| 27 October 2020 First round | Twente | 1–3 | De Graafschap | Enschede |
| 18:45 CET (UTC+1) | Zerrouki (yellow card) 53'; Staring 62' | Report | Hamdaoui 18'; Van Heertum (yellow card) 21'; Konings 34'; Lieftink (yellow card) 77'; Lelieveld 90+4' | Stadium: De Grolsch Veste; Attendance: 0 Referee: Jeroen Manschot |
