= 2022–23 FC Twente season =

FC Twente
2022–23 season
- Chairman: Paul van der Kraan
- Head coach: Ron Jans
- Stadium: De Grolsch Veste
- Eredivisie: 5th
- KNVB Cup: Round of 16
- UEFA Europa Conference League: Play-off round
- Top goalscorer: League: Václav Černý (13); All: Václav Černý (15)
Home colours

The 2022–23 season was the 58th season in the history of FC Twente, and their fourth consecutive season in the Dutch top flight. The club participated in the Eredivisie, the KNVB Cup, and the UEFA Europa Conference League.

== Players ==
=== First-team squad ===
As of 26 July 2022

Note: Flags indicate national team as defined under FIFA eligibility rules; some limited exceptions apply. Players may hold more than one non-FIFA nationality.

No.	Pos.	Nation	Player
1	GK	GER	Lars Unnerstall
2	DF	NED	Mees Hilgers
3	DF	NED	Robin Pröpper (vice-captain)
4	DF	ESP	Julio Pleguezuelo
5	DF	NED	Gijs Smal
6	MF	NED	Wout Brama (captain)
7	FW	CZE	Václav Černý
8	MF	ALG	Ramiz Zerrouki
9	FW	NED	Ricky van Wolfswinkel
10	FW	NED	Virgil Misidjan
11	FW	NED	Daan Rots
14	MF	NED	Sem Steijn
16	GK	MAR	Issam El Maach

No.	Pos.	Nation	Player
18	MF	NED	Michel Vlap
19	MF	GRE	Christos Tzolis (on loan from Norwich City)
20	DF	NED	Joshua Brenet
21	MF	NOR	Mathias Kjølø
22	GK	POL	Przemysław Tytoń
23	MF	CZE	Michal Sadílek
24	DF	NED	Luca Everink
26	FW	NED	Denilho Cleonise
27	FW	CRC	Manfred Ugalde (on loan from Lommel)
30	GK	NED	Sam Karssies
32	MF	NED	Casper Staring
37	MF	NED	Thijs van Leeuwen
38	MF	NED	Max Bruns

== Pre-season and friendlies ==
Win Draw Loss Fixtures

3 July 2022 Friendly	Twente (Netherlands)	1–0	(Denmark) Nordsjælland	Goor
14:00 CEST (UTC+2)	Steijn 5'	Report		Stadium: Sportpark Heeckeren; Attendance: 2,500; Referee: Bas Nijhuis

8 July 2022 Friendly	Fortuna Düsseldorf (Germany)	1–5	(Netherlands) Twente	Düsseldorf, Germany
14:00 CEST (UTC+2)	Hennings 8'		Černý 32'; Rots 73', 90+'; Staring 79'; Vlap 90+' (pen.)	Stadium: Paul-Janes-Stadion

16 July 2022 Friendly	Twente (Netherlands)	3–3	(Germany) Werder Bremen	Enschede
13:00 CEST (UTC+2)	Ugalde 45'; Van Wolfswinkel 65'; Cleonise 89'; Černý (penalty missed) 105'	Report	Ducksch 26'; Weiser 79'; Schmidt 100'	Stadium: FC Twente-Trainingscentrum; Attendance: 0 Referee: Nick Smit
Note: Match was played in two 60-minute halves. Match was played behind closed doors due to security concerns.

22 July 2022 Friendly	Twente (Netherlands)	3–1	(Germany) Schalke 04	Enschede
20:00 CEST (UTC+2)	Vlap 13'; Steijn 83'; Ugalde 89'	Report	Kamiński 9'; Latza (yellow card) 45+1'	Stadium: De Grolsch Veste; Attendance: 26,000; Referee: Serdar Gözübüyük

29 July 2022 Friendly	Twente (Netherlands)	4–1	(Italy) Bologna	Enschede
19:00 CEST (UTC+2)	Rots 2'; Misidjan (yellow card) 30'; Brenet 32'; Vlap 36'; Smal 47'; Pleguezuelo (yellow card) 58'; Zerrouki (yellow card) 72'		Medel (yellow card) 31'; Soumaoro 45'; Domínguez (yellow card) 57'	Stadium: De Grolsch Veste; Referee: Marc Nagtegaal

3 December 2022 Friendly	Almere City (Netherlands)	1–1	(Netherlands) Twente	Almere
13:30 CET (UTC+1)	Duijvestijn 44'	Report	Bruns 86'	Stadium: Yanmar Stadion

10 December 2022 Friendly	Twente (Netherlands)	2–1	(Netherlands) Sparta Rotterdam	Enschede
17:00 CET (UTC+1)		Report		Stadium: De Grolsch Veste

17 December 2022 Friendly	Alajuelense (Costa Rica)	2–2	(Netherlands) Twente	Costa Rica
23:00 CET (UTC+1)		Report

21 December 2022 Friendly	Alajuelense (Costa Rica)	3–2	(Netherlands) Twente	Costa Rica
17:00 CET (UTC+1)		Report

== Competitions ==
=== Overall record ===
Competition	First match	Last match	Starting round	Final position	Record							
Competition	First match	Last match	Starting round	Final position	Pld	W	D	L	GF	GA	GD	Win %
Eredivisie	7 August 2022	28 May 2023	Matchday 1	5th	34	18	10	6	66	27	+39	52.94
Eredivisie Play-offs	1 June 2023	11 June 2023	Semi-finals	Winners	4	3	1	0	8	1	+7	75.00
KNVB Cup	10 January 2023	9 February 2023	Second round	Round of 16	2	1	0	1	3	1	+2	50.00
UEFA Europa Conference League	4 August 2022	25 August 2022	Third qualifying round	Play-off round	4	2	1	1	8	4	+4	50.00
Total					44	24	12	8	85	33	+52	54.55

Source: Soccerway

=== Eredivisie ===
==== League table ====
Pos	Team	Pld	W	D	L	GF	GA	GD	Pts	Qualification or relegation
3	Ajax	34	20	9	5	86	38	+48	69	Qualification to Europa League play-off round
4	AZ	34	20	7	7	68	35	+33	67	Qualification to Europa Conference League third qualifying round
5	Twente (O)	34	18	10	6	66	27	+39	64	Qualification to European competition play-offs
6	Sparta Rotterdam	34	17	8	9	60	37	+23	59	Qualification to European competition play-offs
7	Utrecht	34	15	9	10	55	50	+5	54	Qualification to European competition play-offs

Source: Eredivisie
Rules for classification: Season in progress: 1) Most points won; 2) Less points lost; 3) Goal difference; 4) Goals scored; 5) Alphabetical order; End of season: 1) Points; 2) Goal difference; 3) Goals scored; 4) Head-to-head points; 5) Head-to-head goal difference; 6) Head-to-head away goals scored; 7) Play-off if relevant for deciding champion, relegation or participating in a European league, otherwise by draw. 8) Penalty shoot-out (only after a play-off)
(O) Play-off Winner

==== Results by round ====
Round	1	2	3	4	5	6	7	8	9	10	11	12	13	14	15	16	17	18	19	20	21	22	23	24	25	26	27	28	29	30	31	32	33	34
Ground	A	H	A	H	H	A	A	H	A	H	A	H	H	A	H	A	H	A	H	A	H	A	A	H	A	H	A	H	A	H	A	H	A	H
Result	W	W	L	W	W	D	L	W	L	W	W	W	D	D	W	D	W	D	D	D	W	L	L	D	W	W	D	W	L	D	W	W	W	W
Position	6	4	2	5	5	5	5	5	5	5	5	5	5	5	4	5	4	4																

Source: Eredivisie
A = Away; H = Home; W = Win; D = Draw; L = Loss

==== Matches ====
The league fixtures were announced on 17 June 2022.

7 August 2022 1	NEC	0–1	Twente	Nijmegen
14:30 CEST (UTC+2)	Duelund (yellow card) 53'	Report	Sadilek (yellow card) 50'; Steijn 90+1'	Stadium: Goffertstadion; Attendance: 12,256; Referee: Danny Makkelie

14 August 2022 2	Twente	3–0	Fortuna Sittard	Enschede
14:30 CEST (UTC+2)	van Wolfswinkel 22', (yellow card) 74'; Brenet 44'; Misidjan 53'	Report	Duarte (yellow card) 73'; Seuntjens (yellow card) 80'; Yılmaz (yellow card) 90+2'	Stadium: De Grolsch Veste; Attendance: 27,000; Referee: Martin van den Kerkhof

28 August 2022 3	FC Volendam	1–0	Twente	Volendam
14:30 CEST (UTC+2)	Douiri (yellow card) 45'; van Mieghem (yellow card) 61'; Zeefuik 83'	Report		Stadium: Kras Stadion; Attendance: 6,750; Referee: (Netherlands) Alex Bos

31 August 2022 4	Twente	4–0	Excelsior	Enschede
21:00 CEST (UTC+2)	Cleonise 1'; Tzolis 8'; Černý 62' 90+3'	Report		Stadium: De Grolsch Veste; Attendance: 27,000; Referee: (Netherlands) Marc Nagtegaal

3 September 2022 5	Twente	2–1	PSV	Enschede
18:45 CEST (UTC+2)	Černý 17' 24'; Pröpper (yellow card) 27'	Report	Til 55'; Max (yellow card) 74'; Sangaré (yellow card) 76'	Stadium: De Grolsch Veste; Attendance: 30,000; Referee: (Netherlands) Danny Makkelie

11 September 2022 6	AZ	1–1	Twente	Enschede
16:45 CEST (UTC+2)	Claise (yellow card) 46'; Odgaard 54'	Report	Ugalde 81'; Hilgers (yellow card) 89'; Misidjan (yellow card) 90+2'	Stadium: De Grolsch Veste; Attendance: 16,269; Referee: (Netherlands) Pol van Boekel

18 September 2022 7	Heerenveen	2–1	Twente	Heerenveen
14:30 CEST (UTC+2)	van Ewijk 28'; Bochniewicz 36'; Tahiri (yellow card) 55'; Kaib (yellow card) 79'; van Ottele (yellow card) 90+5'	Report	Misidjan 2'; Smal (yellow card) 14'; Pröpper (yellow card) 15'	Stadium: Abe Lenstra Stadion; Attendance: 21,039; Referee: (Netherlands) Jeroen Manschot

1 October 2022 8	Twente	3–0	Vitesse	Enschede
21:00 CEST (UTC+2)	Brenet 37'; Pröpper (yellow card) 45+4'; Misidjan 74'; Smal 90+3'	Report	Wittek (yellow card) 52'	Stadium: De Grolsch Veste; Attendance: 29,500; Referee: (Netherlands) Danny Makkelie

9 October 2022 9	Feyenoord	2–0	Twente	Rotterdam
14:30 CEST (UTC+2)	Kökçü (yellow card) 30' (goal) 43'; Hancko 64'; Igor Paixão (yellow card) 73'	Report	Brenet (yellow card) 41'; Černý (red card) 45+2'	Stadium: Stadion Feijenoord; Attendance: 47,500; Referee: (Netherlands) Dennis Higler

16 October 2022 10	Twente	3–0	Groningen	Enschede
14:30 CEST (UTC+2)	Misidjan (yellow card) 25' (goal) 48'; Brenet 55'; van Wolfswinkel 84'	Report	Kalley (yellow card) 88'; te Wierik (yellow card) 90+2'	Stadium: De Grolsch Veste; Attendance: 29,000; Referee: (Netherlands) Allard Lindhout

23 October 2022 11	Cambuur	0–1	Twente	Leeuwarden
14:30 CEST (UTC+2)	van der Water (yellow card) 29'; Schmidt (yellow card) 32'; Uldriķis (yellow card) 35'	Report	Misidjan (yellow card) 3'; Brenet (yellow card) 62'; van Wolfswinkel 90+7' (pen.)	Stadium: Cambuur Stadion; Attendance: 10,000; Referee: (Netherlands) Jochem Kamphuis

30 October 2022 12	Twente	3–0	RKC Waalwijk	Enschede
14:30 CEST (UTC+2)	Steijn 34' 45'; Pröpper (yellow card) 46'; van Wolfswinkel 89'	Report	Lelieveld (yellow card) 6'; Augustijns (yellow card) 85'	Stadium: De Grolsch Veste; Attendance: 29,100; Referee: (Netherlands) Rob Dieperink

6 November 2022 13	Twente	1–1	Go Ahead Eagles	Enschede
14:30 CET (UTC+1)	Hilgers (yellow card) 18'; van Wolfswinkel 34' (pen.); Pröpper (yellow card) 45+1'; Everink (yellow card) 90+1'; Zerrouki (yellow card) 90+2'	Report	Adekanye (yellow card) 37'; Stokkers (yellow card) 86'; Willumsson 90+2' (pen.)	Stadium: De Grolsch Veste; Attendance: 30,000; Referee: (Netherlands) Jeroen Manschot

11 November 2022 14	Sparta Rotterdam	1–1	Twente	Rotterdam
20:00 CET (UTC+1)	Verschueren (yellow card) 60' (goal) 71'; Jeremy van Mullem (yellow card) 62'	Report	Steijn 63'	Stadium: Sparta Stadion Het Kasteel; Attendance: 10,606; Referee: (Netherlands) Alex Bos

6 January 2023 15	Twente	2–0	FC Emmen	Enschede
20:00 CET (UTC+1)	van Wolfswinkel 5'; Hilgers (yellow card) 31'; Sadílek 67'	Report	Assehnoun (yellow card) 87'; Heylen (yellow card) 90+1'	Stadium: De Grolsch Veste; Attendance: 29.500; Referee: Serdar Gözübüyük

14 January 2023 16	Ajax	0–0	Twente	Amsterdam
21:00 CET (UTC+1)	Rensch (red card) 35'; Tadić (yellow card) 55'	Report	Sampsted (yellow card) 13'; van Wolfswinkel (yellow card) 45+6'; Zerrouki (yellow card) 61'; Tzolis (yellow card) 73'	Stadium: Johan Cruijff Arena; Attendance: 53.649; Referee: Allard Lindhout

22 January 2023 17	Twente	2–0	FC Utrecht	Enschede
14:30 CET (UTC+1)	Černý 45+1'; Misidjan 64'; Salah-Eddine (yellow card) 80'	Report	Booth (yellow card) 50'	Stadium: De Grolsch Veste; Attendance: 28.500; Referee: Martin van den Kerkhof

25 January 2023 18	Vitesse	2–2	Twente	Arnhem
18:45 CET (UTC+1)	Vidović 44'; Bero 52'; Oroz (yellow card) 90+6'; Domgjoni (yellow card) 90+7'	Report	van Wolfswinkel 33' (pen.); Černý 59'	Stadium: GelreDome; Attendance: 14.699; Referee: Marc Nagtegaal

29 January 2023 19	Twente	1–1	Feyenoord	Enschede
12:15 CET (UTC+1)				Stadium: De Grolsch Veste

5 February 2023 20	FC Groningen	1–1	Twente	Groningen
16:45 CET (UTC+1)				Stadium: Euroborg

12 February 2023 21	Twente	3–0	FC Volendam	Enschede
16:45 CET (UTC+1)				Stadium: De Grolsch Veste

19 February 2023 22	Go Ahead Eagles	2–0	Twente	Deventer
14:30 CET (UTC+1)				Stadium: De Adelaarshorst

26 February 2023 23	PSV	3–1	Twente	Eindhoven
16:45 CET (UTC+1)				Stadium: Philips Stadion

4 March 2023 24	Twente	3–3	Heerenveen	Enschede
21:00 CET (UTC+1)				Stadium: De Grolsch Veste

11 March 2023 25	Fortuna Sittard	0–3	Twente	Sittard
18:45 CET (UTC+1)				Stadium: Fortuna Sittard Stadion

19 March 2023 26	Twente	2–1	AZ	Enschede
20:00 CET (UTC+1)				Stadium: De Grolsch Veste

1 April 2023 27	Excelsior	0–0	Twente	Rotterdam
18:45 CET (UTC+1)				Stadium: Van Donge & De Roo Stadion

9 April 2023 28	Twente	4–0	Cambuur	Enschede
12:15 CET (UTC+1)				Stadium: De Grolsch Veste

16 April 2023 29	FC Utrecht	1–0	Twente	Utrecht
14:30 CET (UTC+1)				Stadium: Stadion Galgenwaard

23 April 2023 30	Twente	3–3	Sparta Rotterdam	Enschede
12:15 CET (UTC+1)				Stadium: De Grolsch Veste

7 May 2023 31	FC Emmen	0–3	Twente	Emmen
12:15 CET (UTC+1)				Stadium: De Oude Meerdijk

12 May 2023 32	Twente	4–0	NEC	Enschede
20:00 CET (UTC+1)				Stadium: De Grolsch Veste

21 May 2023 33	RKC Waalwijk	0–5	Twente	Waalwijk
14:30 CET (UTC+1)				Stadium: Mandemakers Stadion

28 May 2023 34	Twente	3–1	Ajax	Enschede
14:30 CET (UTC+1)				Stadium: De Grolsch Veste

==== European competition play-offs ====
1 June 2023 Semi-finals First leg	SC Heerenveen	1–2	Twente	Heerenveen
18:45	Haye 45+1'	Report	19' Černý; 90+3' Ugalde	Stadium: Abe Lenstra Stadion; Attendance: 21,360; Referee: Marc Nagtegaal

4 June 2023 Semi-finals Second leg	Twente	4–0	SC Heerenveen	Enschede
14:30	Vlap 11'; Pröpper 22'; Brenet 45'; Misidjan 68'	Report		Stadium: De Grolsch Veste; Attendance: 29,000; Referee: Pol van Boekel

8 June 2023 Final First leg	Sparta Rotterdam	1–1	Twente	Rotterdam
20:00	Van Crooij 47' (pen.)	Report	90+3' Zerrouki	Stadium: Het Kasteel; Attendance: 10,349; Referee: Jeroen Manschot

11 June 2023 Final Second leg	Twente	1–0	Sparta Rotterdam	Enschede
14:30		Report		Stadium: De Grolsch Veste; Referee: Danny Makkelie

=== KNVB Cup ===
10 January 2023 Second round	Twente	3–1	Telstar	Enschede
CET (UTC+1)	Rots 37', 42'; Misidjan 67'	Report	Blackson (yellow card) 31'; Giousis (yellow card) 33'; Oude Kotte 68'	Stadium: De Grolsch Veste; Attendance: 20,000

9 February 2023 Round of 16	Twente	0–1	Ajax	Enschede
18:45 CET (UTC+1)		Report	Kudus 70'	Stadium: De Grolsch Veste; Attendance: 29,500; Referee: Danny Makkelie

=== UEFA Europa Conference League ===
==== Third qualifying round ====
The draw for the third qualifying round was held on 18 July 2022.

4 August 2022 First leg	Čukarički (Serbia)	1–3	(Netherlands) Twente	Belgrade, Serbia
20:00 CEST (UTC+2)	Badamosi (yellow card) 48'; Kovač 59'	Report	Rots 8'; Vlap 31'; Brenet 43'; Smal (yellow card) 65'; Sadilek (yellow card) 85'	Stadium: Partizan Stadium, Belgrade (Note: Čukarički will play their third qualifying round home match at the Partizan Stadium, instead of their regular venue, the Čukarički Stadium); Attendance: 2,374; Referee: Harald Lechner (Austria)

11 August 2022 Second leg	Twente (Netherlands)	4–1 (7–2 agg.)	(Serbia) Čukarički	Enschede, Netherlands
19:00 CEST (UTC+2)	R. Pröpper 16'; Vlap 34'; Tzolis 84', 90+2'	Report	Adžić 7'; Badamosi (yellow card) 54'; Ivanović (yellow card) 62'	Stadium: De Grolsch Veste; Attendance: 22,500; Referee: Kristo Tohver (Estonia)

==== Play-off round ====
The draw for the play-off round was held on 2 August 2022.

18 August 2022 First leg	Fiorentina (Italy)	2–1	(Netherlands) Twente	Florence, Italy
21:00 CEST (UTC+2)	González 2'; Cabral 31'; Milenković (yellow card) 39'; Amrabat (yellow card) 90+1'; Maleh (yellow card) 90+5'	Report	Smal (yellow card) 33'; Pröpper (yellow card) 55'; Vlap (yellow card) 62'; Černý 64', (yellow card) 70'	Stadium: Stadio Artemio Franchi; Attendance: 16,674; Referee: Daniel Stefanski (Poland)

25 August 2022 Second leg	Twente (Netherlands)	0–0 (1–2 agg.)	(Italy) Fiorentina	Enschede, Netherlands
19:00 CEST (UTC+2)	Pröpper (yellow card) 45+1'; Sadílek (yellow card) 58'; Zerrouki (yellow card) 63'; Hilgers (yellow card) 77'	Report	Ikoné (yellow card) 30'; Maleh (yellow card) 43'; Gollini (yellow card) 76'; Igor (yellow card) 83' (yellow-red card) 90+3'	Stadium: De Grolsch Veste; Attendance: 29,500; Referee: Radu Petrescu (Romania)
