= Ramiz Zerrouki =

Algerian footballer (born 1998)

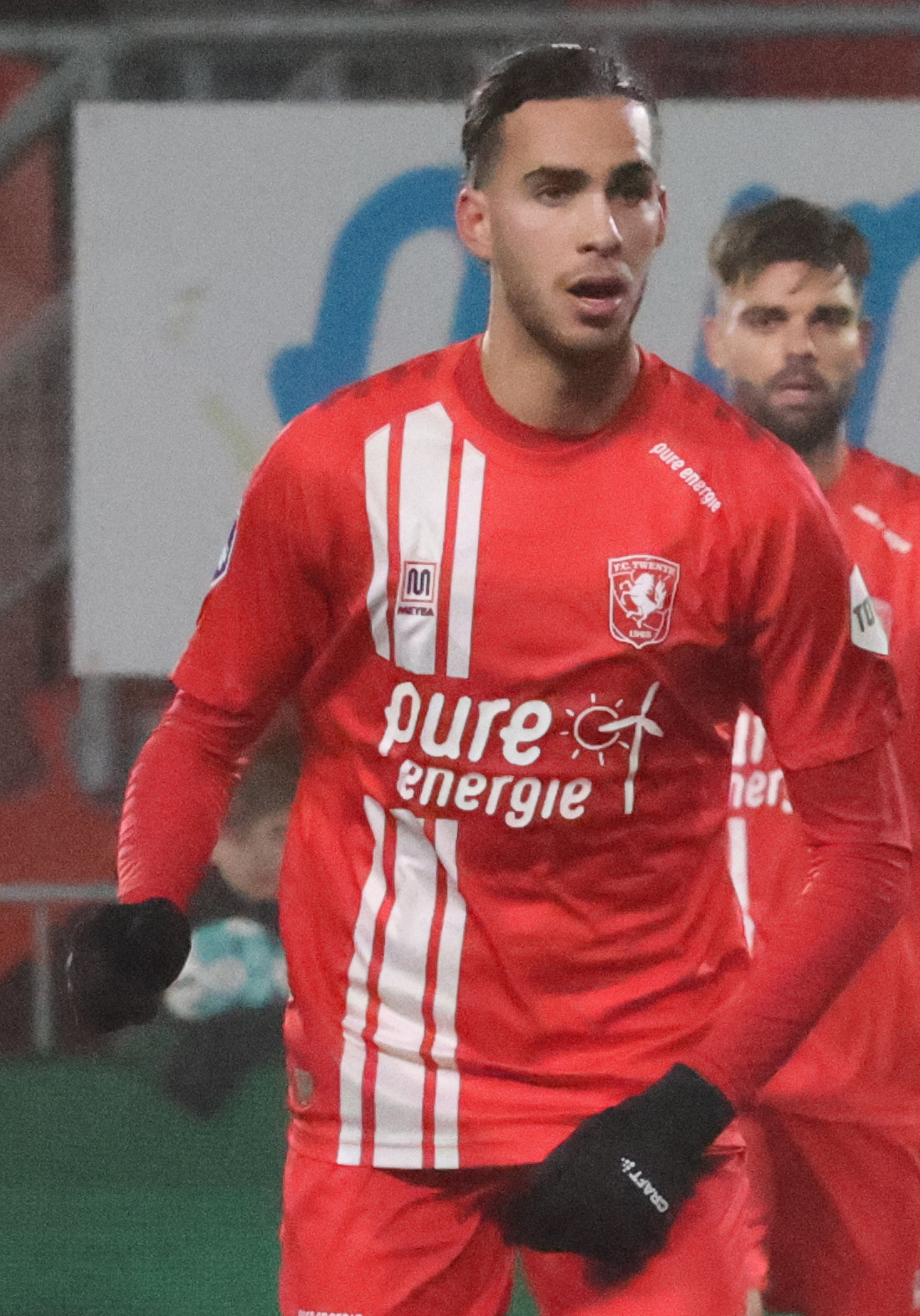
- Zerrouki with Twente in 2022

Personal information
- Full name: Ramiz Larbi Zerrouki
- Date of birth: 26 May 1998 (age 28)
- Place of birth: Amsterdam, Netherlands
- Height: 1.83 m (6 ft 0 in)
- Position: Central midfielder

Team information
- Current team: Twente

Youth career
- 2006–2016: Ajax
- 2016–2019: Twente

Senior career*
Years	Team	Apps	(Gls)
2017–2018	Jong Twente	31	(1)
2019–2023	Twente	95	(3)
2023–2026	Feyenoord	48	(1)
2025–2026	→ Twente (loan)	32	(3)
2026–	Twente	10	(0)

International career^{‡}
2021–	Algeria	56	(3)
- * Club domestic league appearances and goals as of 22:05, 25 October 2026 (UTC) ‡ National team caps and goals as of 2 July 2026

Ramiz Larbi Zerrouki (Arabic: رامز العربي زروقي; born 26 May 1998) is a professional footballer who plays as a central midfielder for Twente, and the Algeria national team.

== Club career ==
=== Twente ===
==== Youth years (2008–18) ====
Born in Amsterdam, Zerrouki started playing football for at the Ajax Youth Academy. However, in 2016, he decided to join the Twente football academy, and became a resident with a host family, namely former Twente player Marcel Mentink and his wife, Birgit.

During the 2017–18 season, he gained experience with the reserve team Jong Twente in the fourth-tier Derde Divisie, where he netted his only goal in a 3–0 away victory against Harkemase Boys. From the 2018–19 season onwards, he continued his development with Jong Twente in the reserves' team league, the Beloften Eredivisie. In August 2018, he signed his first professional contract with Twente, which eventually led to his promotion to the first-team squad in the summer of 2019.

==== First team (2020–23) ====
Zerrouki made his first-team debut for Twente on 30 October 2019, during a KNVB Cup match against De Treffers, which they won 2–0. Under coach Gonzalo García, he made a brief appearance, replacing Queensy Menig in the 89th minute. However, he struggled to secure more opportunities under García and mostly trained with a smaller group at the Twente reserves, led by coach Theo ten Caat.

Despite the initial challenges, his contract was extended in March 2020, keeping him at the club until 30 June 2021. In the run-up to the 2020–21 season, Zerrouki caught the eye of the new coach, Ron Jans. As a result, he began to receive regular playing time from the start of the season, and in October 2020, he extended his contract until 2023. His determination and dedication paid off, and he secured a spot in the starting lineup following an injury to Wout Brama after the winter break.

In the 2021–22 season, Zerrouki marked his presence by scoring his first goals for Twente. He played a crucial role in their 2–0 cup victory against OSS '20 on 27 October 2021, where he scored both goals. Just three days later, he found the back of the net again, this time in a league match against PSV.

In March 2022, Ramiz Zerrouki's commitment to Twente was further solidified when he extended his contract with the club until 2024, with an option for the club to extend the agreement for an additional year.

=== Feyenoord ===
In the summer of 2022, Feyenoord expressed interest in Zerrouki, but a transfer did not materialise. This situation persisted during the winter transfer window of 2022–23 when both clubs failed to reach an agreement. However, in June 2023, they did reach an agreement, and Zerrouki signed a four-year contract with Feyenoord.

Zerrouki made his debut for the club on 4 August, starting in a 1–0 loss to rivals PSV in the Johan Cruyff Shield. He scored his first goal for Feyenoord on 25 October, contributing to a 3–1 home victory against Lazio in the UEFA Champions League group phase. Zerrouki played regularly during his first season at the club, scoring once in 36 appearances in all competitions, as Feyenoord won the KNVB Cup and finished second in the Eredivisie.

==== Loan to Twente ====
On 30 July 2025, Zerrouki re‑joined Twente on a season‑long loan, remaining at De Grolsch Veste until the end of the 2025–26 campaign.

=== Return to Twente ===
On 20 July 2026, Zerrouki made a permanent return to Twente for a reported fee of just over €2 million, signing a four-year deal.

== International career ==
Zerrouki was born in the Netherlands and is Algerian by descent. He had his debut with the Algeria national team in a 3–3 2021 Africa Cup of Nations qualification tie with Zambia on 25 March 2021.

He scored his first goal for Algeria on 2 September 2021 against Djibouti scoring the eighth goal of the game.

He was included in Algeria's squad for the 2021 Africa Cup of Nations.

In December 2023, he was named in Algeria's squad for the 2023 Africa Cup of Nations.

On 31 May 2026, Zerrouki was named in Vladimir Petković's 26-man Algeria squad for the 2026 FIFA World Cup.

== Career statistics ==
=== Club ===
As of match played 25 October 2026

Appearances and goals by club, season and competition
Club	Season	League			KNVB Cup		Europe		Other		Total	
Club	Season	Division	Apps	Goals	Apps	Goals	Apps	Goals	Apps	Goals	Apps	Goals
Twente	2019–20	Eredivisie	0	0	1	0	—		—		1	0
Twente	2020–21	Eredivisie	31	0	1	0	—		—		32	0
Twente	2021–22	Eredivisie	32	2	2	2	—		—		34	4
Twente	2022–23	Eredivisie	32	1	1	0	4 (Note: Appearances in UEFA Conference League)	0	4 (Note: Appearances in Eredivisie European competition play-offs)	1	41	2
Twente	Total		95	3	5	2	4	0	4	1	108	6
Feyenoord	2023–24	Eredivisie	26	0	2	0	7 (Note: Five appearances and one goal in UEFA Champions League, two appearances in UEFA Europa League)	1	1 (Note: Appearance in Johan Cruyff Shield)	0	36	1
Feyenoord	2024–25	Eredivisie	22	1	2	0	4 (Note: Appearances in UEFA Champions League)	0	1	0	29	1
Feyenoord	Total		48	1	4	0	11	1	2	0	65	2
Twente (loan)	2025–26	Eredivisie	32	3	3	0	—		—		35	3
Twente	2026–27	Eredivisie	10	0	0	0	8 (Note: Two appearances in UEFA Europa League, six appearances and two goals in UEFA Conference League)	2	—		18	2
Career total			186	7	12	2	23	3	6	1	227	13

=== International ===
As of match played 2 July 2026

Appearances and goals by national team and year
National team	Year	Apps	Goals
Algeria	2021	9	1
Algeria	2022	11	0
Algeria	2023	8	2
Algeria	2024	13	0
Algeria	2025	6	0
Algeria	2026	9	0
Total		56	3

Algeria score listed first, score column indicates score after each Zerrouki goal.

List of international goals scored by Ramiz Zerrouki
No.	Date	Venue	Cap	Opponent	Score	Result	Competition	Ref.
1	2 September 2021	Mustapha Tchaker Stadium, Blida, Algeria	5	Djibouti	8–0	8–0	2022 FIFA World Cup qualification	
2	12 October 2023	Chahid Hamlaoui Stadium, Constantine, Algeria	25	Cape Verde	4–1	5–1	Friendly	
3	19 November 2023	Estádio do Zimpeto, Maputo, Mozambique	28	Mozambique	2–0	2–0	2026 FIFA World Cup qualification	

== Honours ==
Feyenoord

- KNVB Cup: 2023–24
- Johan Cruyff Shield: 2024

Individual

- Eredivisie Team of the Month: January 2023
