= Joshua Brenet =

Dutch-Curaçaoan footballer (born 1994)

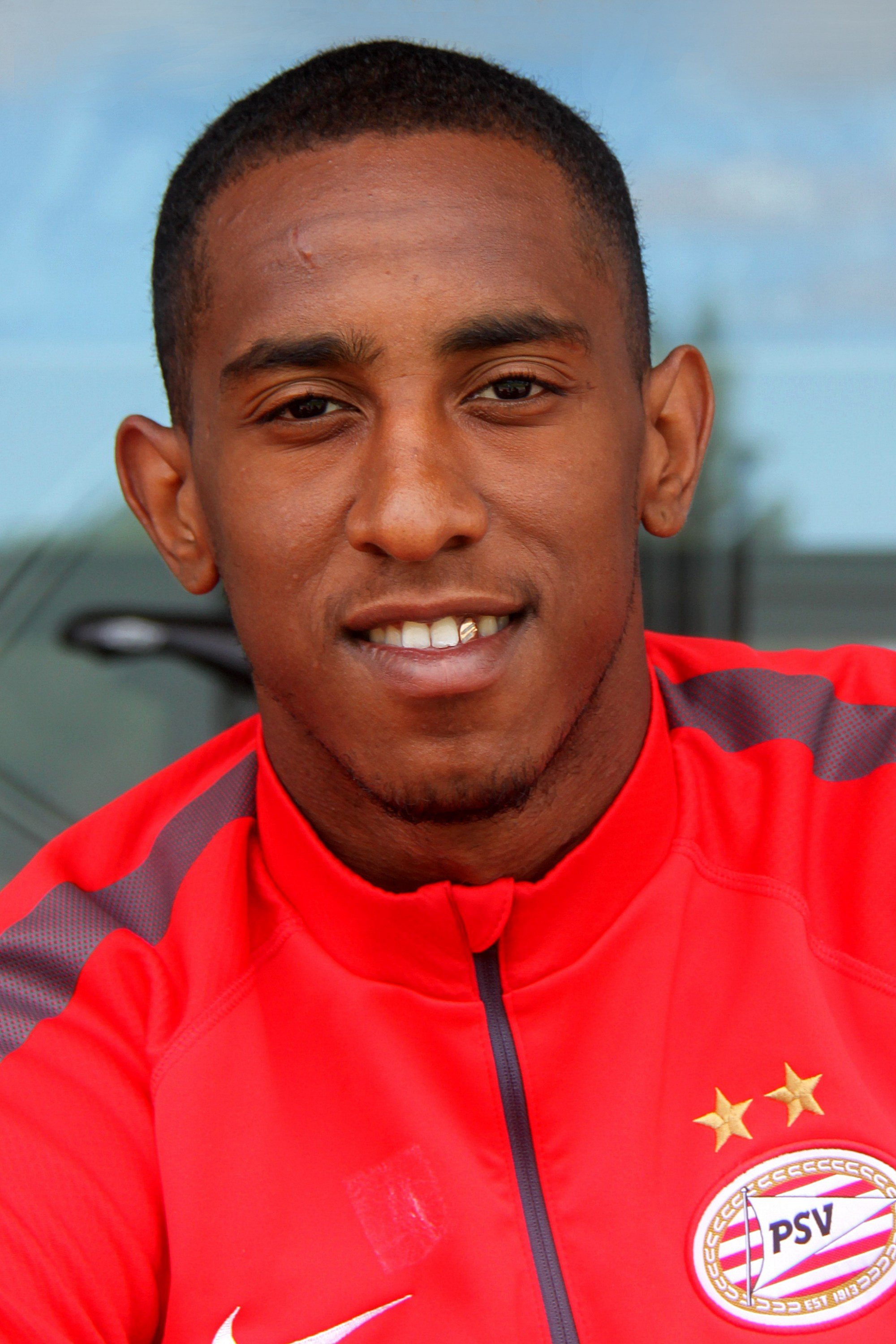
- Brenet with PSV Eindhoven in 2014

Personal information
- Full name: Joshua Benjamin Brenet
- Date of birth: 20 March 1994 (age 32)
- Place of birth: Kerkrade, Netherlands
- Height: 1.81 m (5 ft 11 in)
- Position: Full-back

Team information
- Current team: Kayserispor
- Number: 20

Youth career
- SV Heerlen
- Roda JC
- 2006–2008: FC Omniworld
- 2008–2009: ASC Waterwijk
- 2009–2011: AVV Zeeburgia
- 2011–2012: PSV

Senior career*
Years	Team	Apps	(Gls)
2013–2015	Jong PSV	12	(1)
2012–2018	PSV	109	(3)
2018–2022	TSG Hoffenheim	15	(2)
2020–2021	→ Vitesse (loan)	4	(0)
2021–2022	TSG Hoffenheim II	10	(1)
2022–2024	Twente	60	(11)
2024–2025	Al-Rayyan	0	(0)
2025–2026	Livingston	14	(0)
2026–	Kayserispor	11	(0)

International career^{‡}
2011–2012	Netherlands U18	2	(0)
2013	Netherlands U19	4	(0)
2013–2016	Netherlands U21	11	(0)
2016	Netherlands	2	(0)
2024–	Curaçao	21	(2)
- * Club domestic league appearances and goals as of 29 May 2026 ‡ National team caps and goals as of 4 October 2026

Joshua Benjamin Brenet (born 20 March 1994) is a professional footballer who plays as a full-back for Kayserispor. Born in the Netherlands, he plays for the Curaçao national team.

== Club career ==
=== PSV ===
Brenet is a graduate of PSV's youth academy, having joined the club in 2011 from Zeeburgia. He made his professional debut on 6 December 2012 in a Europa League game against Napoli, coming on for Peter van Ooijen after 87 minutes. He made his Champions League qualification debut on 30 July 2013 against Zulte Waregem.

In November 2015, Brenet's contract with the club was extended until summer 2017, and in December 2016, his contract with the club was again extended until summer 2020.

He played on 15 April 2018 as PSV beat rivals Ajax 3–0 to clinch the 2017–18 Eredivisie title.

=== TSG Hoffenheim ===
On 24 May 2018, it was announced that Brenet had signed for Bundesliga club TSG Hoffenheim on a four-year contract, for a fee rumoured to be €3,500,000. Though he made 14 Bundesliga appearances in his debut season at the club under manager Julian Nagelsmann, he did not play in the Bundesliga at all in the first half of the 2019–20 season under new manager Alfred Schreuder, and on 31 January 2020, he joined SBV Vitesse on loan until the end of the season. He played 4 times for the club prior to the suspension of their season due to the COVID-19 pandemic.

Brenet made just one Bundesliga appearance during the 2020–21 season, as a late substitute in the first match of the season, and he was moved to the club's reserve team for the 2021–22 season, for whom he made 10 appearances in the Regionalliga Südwest, and scored one goal.

=== Twente ===
On 31 January 2022, Brenet joined Twente until the end of the 2021–22 season. In July 2022, he signed a new two-year contract with the club, turning down a contract offer from Feyenoord.

=== Later career ===
Brenet signed for Al-Rayyan SC in September 2024. His only appearances came in the AFC Champions League Elite as he was not registered by the club to play in the domestic league. He left the club in June 2025.

In September 2025, Brenet was linked with a move to Scottish side Livingston. He signed for Livi on 1 October 2025 until July 2026. During his four-month stay with The Lions, the team failed to win a game, and Brenet announced on his Instagram page that he had signed for Kayserispor on 6 February. This was later confirmed by Livingston, saying he "exercised his option to depart the club" for an undisclosed fee.

== International career ==
Born in the Netherlands, Brenet is of Curaçaoan descent. Brenet made his debut for the Netherlands in a November 2016 friendly match against Belgium. He was called up to the preliminary squad for the Curaçao national team for the 2021 CONCACAF Gold Cup.

Brenet made his debut for Curaçao on 5 June 2024 in a 2026 World Cup qualification match starting against Barbados.

On 18 May 2026, he was named by head coach Dick Advocaat in the 26-man squad for the 2026 FIFA World Cup, marking the country's first-ever appearance at the tournament.

== Personal life ==
In March 2024, he was sentenced to a month in prison for driving without a license on two occasions. His contract with Twente expired at the end of the 2023–24 season and was not extended.

== Career statistics ==
=== Club ===
As of match played 17 May 2026

Appearances and goals by club, season and competition
Club	Season	League			Cup		Continental		Other		Total	
Club	Season	Division	Apps	Goals	Apps	Goals	Apps	Goals	Apps	Goals	Apps	Goals
PSV Eindhoven	2012–13	Eredivisie	0	0	0	0	1	0	—		1	0
PSV Eindhoven	2013–14	Eredivisie	12	0	1	1	4	0	—		17	1
PSV Eindhoven	2014–15	Eredivisie	18	1	2	0	9	0	—		29	1
PSV Eindhoven	2015–16	Eredivisie	27	0	4	0	7	0	1 (Note: Appearance in Johan Cruyff Shield)	0	39	0
PSV Eindhoven	2016–17	Eredivisie	20	1	1	0	4	0	1	0	26	1
PSV Eindhoven	2017–18	Eredivisie	32	1	4	0	2	0	—		38	1
PSV Eindhoven	Total		109	3	12	1	27	0	2	0	150	4
Jong PSV	2013–14	Eerste Divisie	9	1	—		—		—		9	1
Jong PSV	2014–15	Eerste Divisie	3	1	—		—		—		3	1
Jong PSV	Total		12	2	—		—		—		12	2
1899 Hoffenheim	2018–19	Bundesliga	14	2	1	1	2 (Note: Appearances in UEFA Champions League)	0	—		17	3
1899 Hoffenheim	2019–20	Bundesliga	0	0	2	0	—		—		2	0
1899 Hoffenheim	2020–21	Bundesliga	1	0	1	0	—		—		2	0
1899 Hoffenheim	Total		15	2	4	1	2	0	—		21	3
Vitesse (loan)	2019–20	Eredivisie	4	0	0	0	0	0	—		4	0
1899 Hoffenheim II	2021–22	Regionalliga Südwest	10	1	—		—		—		10	1
Twente	2021–22	Eredivisie	13	2	—		—		—		13	2
Twente	2022–23	Eredivisie	32	7	1	0	4 (Note: Appearances in UEFA Europa Conference League)	1	4 (Note: Appearances in Eredivisie European competition play-offs)	2	41	9
Twente	2023–24	Eredivisie	15	2	1	0	4	0	—		20	2
Twente	Total		60	11	2	0	8	1	4	2	74	13
Al-Rayyan	2024−25	Qatar Stars League	0	0	0	0	6 (Note: Appearances in AFC Champions League)	0	1 (Note: Appearance in Qatar-UAE Super Cup)	0	7	0
Livingston	2025–26	Scottish Premier League	14	0	1	0	0	0	0	0	15	0
Kayserispor	2025–26	Turkish Super League	11	0	0	0	0	0	0	0	11	0
Career total			235	19	19	2	43	0	7	2	304	23

=== International ===
As of match played 4 October 2026

Appearances and goals by national team and year
National team	Year	Apps	Goals
Netherlands	2016	2	0
Curaçao	2024	8	1
Curaçao	2025	8	0
Curaçao	2026	5	1
Total		23	2

Scores and results list Curaçao's goal tally first, score column indicates score after each Brenet goal.

List of international goals scored by Joshua Brenet
No.	Date	Venue	Opponent	Score	Result	Competition
1	6 September 2024	Kirani James Athletic Stadium, St. George's, Grenada	Saint Lucia	1–2	1–2	2024–25 CONCACAF Nations
2	6 June 2026	Ergilio Hato Stadium, Willemstad, Curaçao	Aruba	1–0	4–0	Friendly

== Honours ==
PSV

- Eredivisie: 2014–15, 2015–16, 2017–18
- Johan Cruijff Shield: 2015, 2016

Individual

- Eredivisie Team of the Month: March 2022
