= Luca Everink =

Dutch footballer (born 2001)

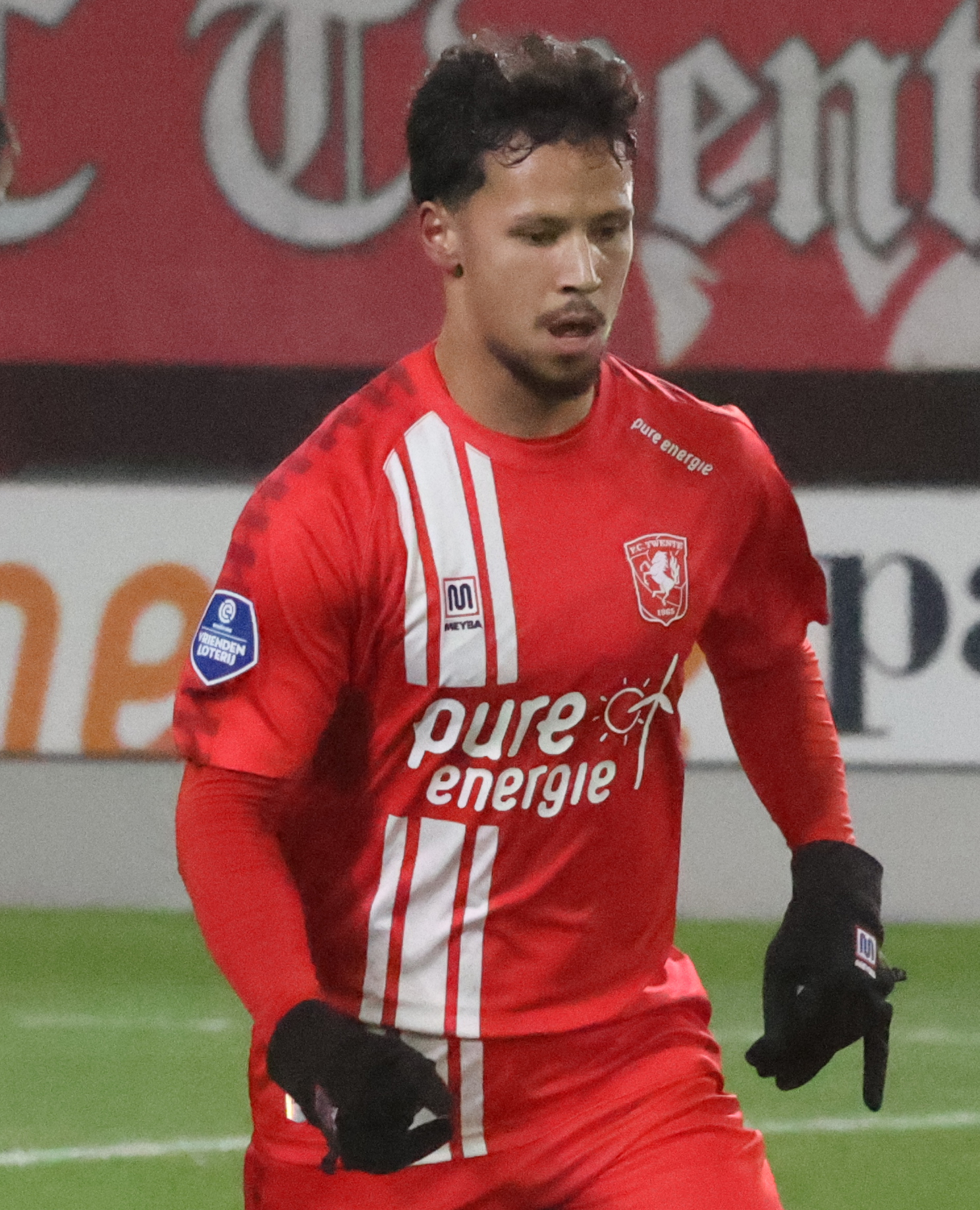
- Everink playing for Twente in 2022

Personal information
- Date of birth: 9 February 2001 (age 25)
- Place of birth: Diepenveen, Netherlands
- Height: 1.79 m (5 ft 10 in)
- Position: Full-back

Team information
- Current team: Emmen (on loan from Go Ahead Eagles)
- Number: 36

Youth career
- –2012: DSC
- 2012–2020: Twente

Senior career*
Years	Team	Apps	(Gls)
2021–2023	Twente	7	(0)
2023	TOP Oss	4	(0)
2023–	Go Ahead Eagles	11	(0)
2025–	→ Emmen (loan)	24	(0)
- * Club domestic league appearances and goals as of 28 April 2026

Luca Everink (born 9 February 2001) is a Dutch professional footballer who plays as a full-back for Eerste Divisie club Emmen, on loan from Eredivisie club Go Ahead Eagles.

== Career ==
Born in Diepenveen, Everink started his career at local amateur side DSC before joining the FC Twente/Heracles academy at 11 years of age. He made his Eredivisie debut for the senior Twente side away against SC Cambuur on 28 August 2021.

On 31 January 2023, Everink's contract with Twente was terminated by mutual consent.

On 13 February 2023, Everink signed a three-year contract with Go Ahead Eagles, beginning in the 2023–24 season.

== Personal life ==
Born in the Netherlands, Everink is of Indonesian descent.

== Career statistics ==
As of match played 21 December 2025

Appearances and goals by club, season and competition
Club	Season	League			Cup		Europe		Other		Total	
Club	Season	Division	Apps	Goals	Apps	Goals	Apps	Goals	Apps	Goals	Apps	Goals
Twente	2021–22	Eredivisie	4	0	0	0	—		—		4	0
Twente	2022–23	Eredivisie	3	0	0	0	0	0	—		3	0
Twente	Total		7	0	0	0	0	0	—		7	0
TOP Oss	2022–23	Eerste Divisie	4	0	0	0	—		—		4	0
Go Ahead Eagles	2023–24	Eredivisie	7	0	1	0	—		0	0	8	0
Go Ahead Eagles	2024–25	Eredivisie	4	0	0	0	2 (Note: Appearances in UEFA Conference League)	0	—		6	0
Go Ahead Eagles	2025–26	Eredivisie	0	0	0	0	0	0	0	0	0	0
Go Ahead Eagles	Total		11	0	1	0	2	0	0	0	14	0
Emmen (loan)	2025–26	Eerste Divisie	15	0	0	0	—		—		15	0
Career total			37	0	1	0	2	0	0	0	40	0

== Honours ==
Go Ahead Eagles

- KNVB Cup: 2024–25
