= Gijs Smal =

Dutch footballer

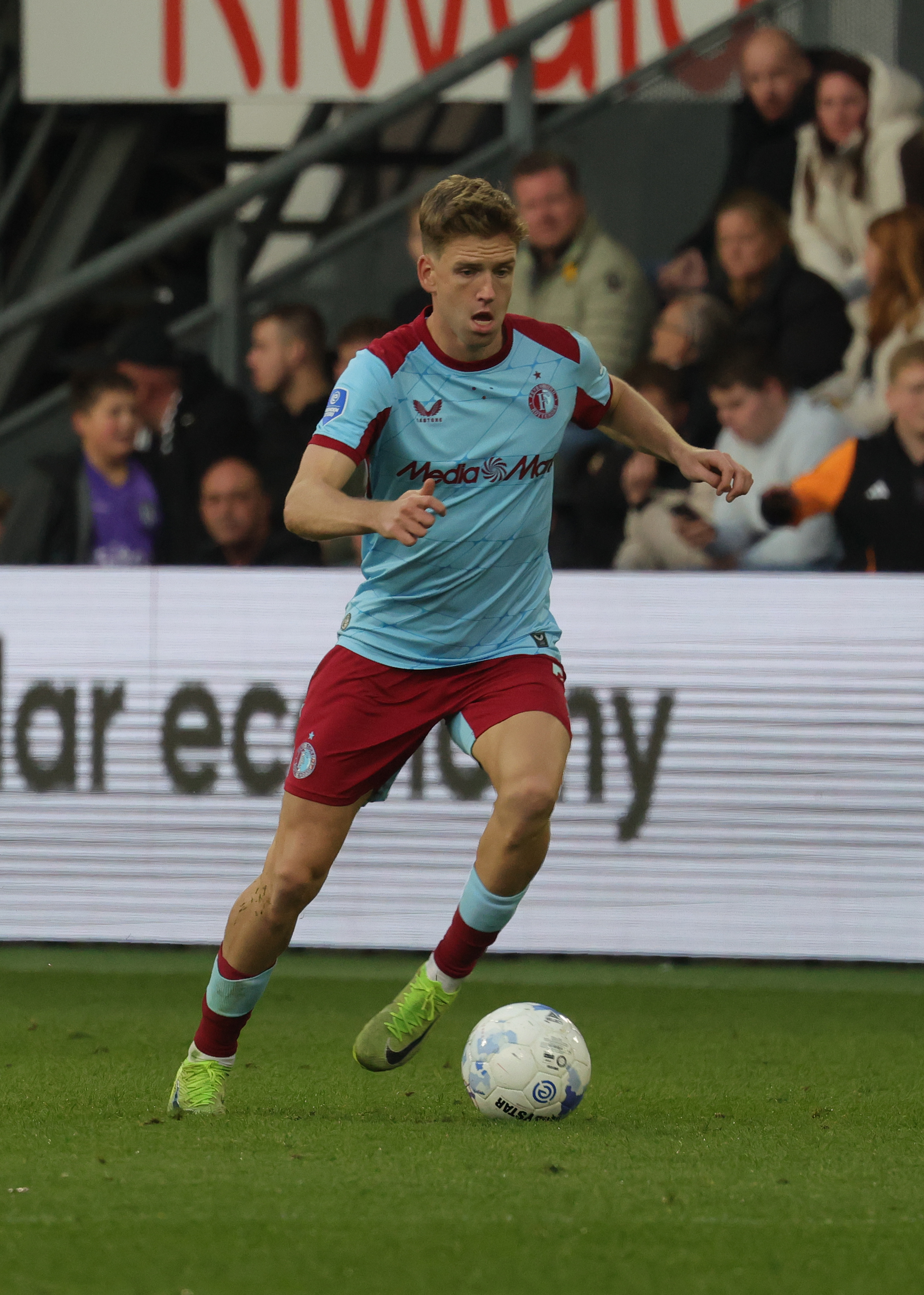
- Smal in 2025 with Feyenoord

Personal information
- Date of birth: 31 August 1997 (age 29)
- Place of birth: De Rijp, Netherlands
- Height: 1.83 m (6 ft 0 in)
- Position: Left-back

Team information
- Current team: Feyenoord
- Number: 5

Youth career
- SV De Rijp
- 2010–2012: AFC '34
- 2012–2015: Volendam

Senior career*
Years	Team	Apps	(Gls)
2015–2020	Jong Volendam	63	(4)
2017–2020	Volendam	68	(9)
2020–2024	Twente	107	(4)
2024–	Feyenoord	42	(0)
- * Club domestic league appearances and goals as of 21 May 2026

Gijs Smal (born 31 August 1997) is a Dutch professional footballer who plays as a left-back for Eredivisie club Feyenoord.

== Career ==
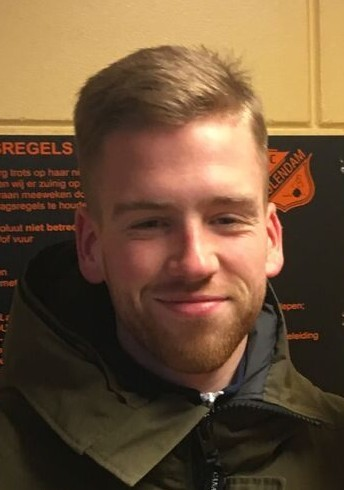
Smal in 2018

Born in De Rijp, Smal made his Eerste Divisie debut for FC Volendam on 22 September 2017 in a game against De Graafschap. He then managed to establish himself in the starting line-up and made 28 league appearances in his first season. The following season, Smal lost the competition for left-back to Robin Schouten, who had come over from Jong Ajax, and mainly appeared as a substitute. However, he did become champion of the Derde Divisie Sunday with the reserve team, Jong Volendam. Under the new head coach Wim Jonk, he again became a starter for the first team in the 2019–20 season. With six goals and ten assists, he was a key player in the second-tier that season, which was suspended and later abandoned due to the COVID-19 pandemic.

On 26 June 2020, Smal signed a three-year contract with Eredivisie club FC Twente, coming over on a free transfer.

=== Feyenoord ===
On 31 May 2024, Smal signed a four-year contract with Feyenoord. He made his official debut for the club on 18 August, coming on as a substitute in a 5–1 away win against PEC Zwolle.

== Career statistics ==
As of match played 17 May 2026

Appearances and goals by club, season and competition
Club	Season	League			KNVB Cup		Europe		Other		Total	
Club	Season	Division	Apps	Goals	Apps	Goals	Apps	Goals	Apps	Goals	Apps	Goals
Jong Volendam	2015–16	Beloften Eredivisie	7	0	—		—		—		7	0
Jong Volendam	2016–17	Derde Divisie	33	1	—		—		—		33	1
Jong Volendam	2017–18	Derde Divisie	7	1	—		—		—		7	1
Jong Volendam	2018–19	Derde Divisie	16	2	—		—		—		16	2
Jong Volendam	Total		63	4	—		—		—		63	4
FC Volendam	2017–18	Eerste Divisie	28	3	—		—		—		28	3
FC Volendam	2018–19	Eerste Divisie	12	0	—		—		—		12	0
FC Volendam	2019–20	Eerste Divisie	28	6	1	0	—		—		29	6
FC Volendam	Total		68	9	1	0	—		—		69	9
FC Twente	2020–21	Eredivisie	22	0	1	0	—		—		23	0
FC Twente	2021–22	Eredivisie	25	2	2	0	—		—		27	0
FC Twente	2022–23	Eredivisie	34	2	2	0	4 (Note: Appearances in UEFA Europa Conference League)	0	4 (Note: Appearances in Eredivisie European competition play-offs)	0	44	2
FC Twente	2023–24	Eredivisie	26	0	1	0	2	0	—		29	0
FC Twente	Total		107	4	6	0	6	0	4	0	123	2
Feyenoord	2024–25	Eredivisie	25	0	2	0	11 (Note: Appearances in UEFA Champions League)	0	0	0	38	0
Feyenoord	2025–26	Eredivisie	17	0	1	0	5 (Note: Appearances in UEFA Europa League)	0	—		23	0
Feyenoord	Total		42	0	3	0	16	0	0	0	61	0
Career total			261	19	10	0	22	0	4	0	297	21

== Honours ==
Individual

- Eredivisie Team of the Month: May 2022, August 2022, November 2022, January 2023,
