= Václav Černý (footballer) =

Czech footballer (born 1997)

- Černý with Rangers in 2025

Personal information
- Date of birth: 17 October 1997 (age 29)
- Place of birth: Příbram, Czech Republic
- Height: 1.82 m (6 ft 0 in)
- Positions: Attacking midfielder; wide midfielder

Team information
- Current team: Beşiktaş
- Number: 18

Youth career
- –2013: 1. FK Příbram
- 2013–2015: Ajax

Senior career*
Years	Team	Apps	(Gls)
2015–2019	Jong Ajax	69	(31)
2015–2019	Ajax	16	(1)
2019–2021	Utrecht	13	(0)
2019	Jong Utrecht	3	(2)
2020–2021	→ Twente (loan)	16	(6)
2021–2023	Twente	50	(14)
2023–2025	VfL Wolfsburg	24	(4)
2024–2025	→ Rangers (loan)	33	(12)
2025–	Beşiktaş	41	(8)

International career^{‡}
2012–2013	Czech Republic U16	8	(3)
2012–2014	Czech Republic U17	27	(8)
2014–2015	Czech Republic U19	7	(1)
2015–2017	Czech Republic U21	16	(9)
2020–2026	Czech Republic	30	(8)
- * Club domestic league appearances and goals as of 22:28, 22 November 2026 (UTC) ‡ National team caps and goals as of 10 July 2026

Václav Černý (born 17 October 1997) is a Czech professional footballer who plays as a wide midfielder or attacking midfielder for Süper Lig club Beşiktaş.

== Club career ==
=== AFC Ajax ===
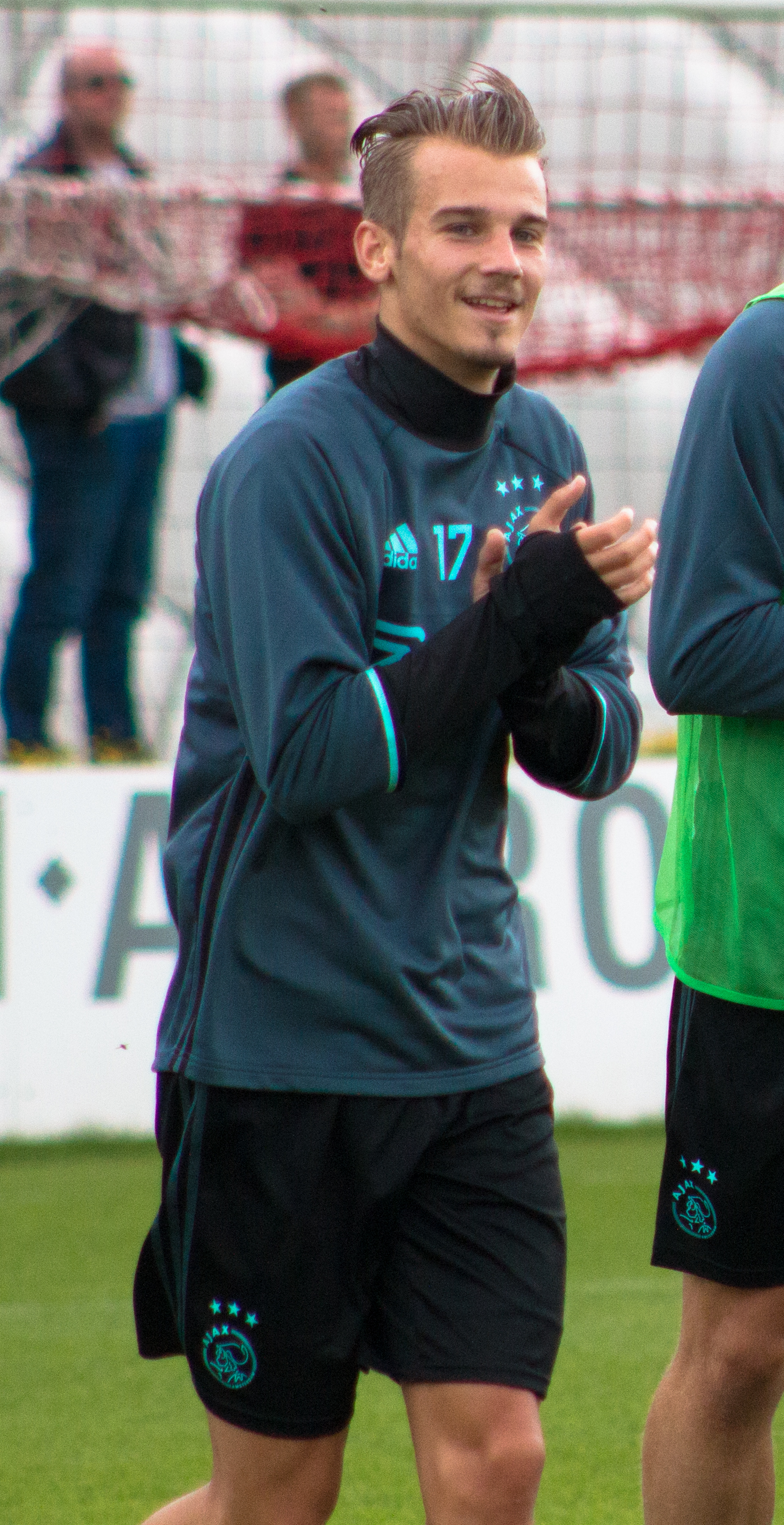
Cerny during training with Ajax in 2016

In January 2013, Černý signed a youth contract with Dutch club Ajax, moving there exactly one year after that in January 2014, as he could only transfer after turning 16. Following the footsteps of Zdeněk Grygera and Tomáš Galásek, Černý became the third Czech player to join said club. In January 2015, he signed a professional contract with Ajax, valid until 2018.

==== 2015–16 season ====
At the start of the 2015–16 season, Černý joined Ajax first team for a training camp in Austria. On 15 August 2015, he made his first team debut with jersey number 32 in the second round of the Eredivisie 2015/16 against Willem II, ending in a 3–0 victory. Coach Frank de Boer sent him onto the pitch in the 77th minute, replacing Riechedly Bazoer (Ajax had both of their wingers injured, German Amin Younes and Dane Viktor Fischer). He assisted in a goalscoring action during stoppage time. Five days later on 20 August, Černý made his European competition debut in a home play-off match of the 2015/16 UEFA Europa League against Czech team FK Jablonec (a 1–0 victory for Ajax, entering the pitch in the 85th minute, replacing Anwar El Ghazi). His first goal for Ajax came the same year on 26 November, in the group stage of the 2015–16 UEFA Europa League against Scottish team Celtic at their home ground, where he scored the winning goal in the 88th minute for a final score of 2–1 for Ajax.

==== 2017–18 season ====
In October 2017, Černý did not finish a Wednesday match in the Dutch Cup against third-tier De Dijk, in which he contributed one goal to a 4–1 victory and progression to the Round of 16. The Czech winger suffered a serious knee injury. Subsequent examinations confirmed that he tore the anterior cruciate ligament in his knee during the cup match, ending his season prematurely. In mid-December, he underwent surgery.

==== 2018–19 season ====
Černý returned to football with Ajax's junior team in September 2018 after an eleven-month absence. In December 2018, he sat on the bench for the first team for the first time since his injury. At the start of the year, he gained his first minutes in the first team, playing in a cup match against Heerenveen. During the winter transfer window, he rejected a move to Heerenveen.

=== Utrecht ===
Černý joined Utrecht in July 2019, signing a three-year contract with Eredivisie side.

Černý spent the 2020–21 Eredivisie on loan at Twente before transferring permanently in July 2021. On 2 June 2023, Černý was named Eredivisie player of the month for May 2023. On 14 January 2022, he suffered a knee injury after an Eredivisie match against his former club, Ajax.

=== Twente ===
==== 2020–21 season ====
In July 2020, Černý transferred from Utrecht to Twente Enschede for a one-year loan. Černý scored his first goal for Twente on 20 September, opening the scoring against Feyenoord in the second minute, contributing to a 1–1 draw. One week later, Černý played a role in Twente's 3:1 victory over Groningen. On 3 October, Černý scored for the third consecutive match, opening the scoring against Emmen in the 48th minute. However, it was not enough for victory as the match ended in a 1–1 draw. Černý's season came to an early end in January when he tore ligaments in his knee during a match against Ajax. In 17 competitive matches during the season, Černý scored six goals and provided seven assists, earning his first call-up to the senior national team.

==== 2021–22 season ====
In early July 2021, Černý transferred from Utrecht to Twente permanently, signing a two-year contract with an option for another two years. Černý returned to training with Twente in October 2021 after a nine-month absence due to injury. He made his first appearance after injury on 20 November, coming on for the final minutes of a league match against Sparta Rotterdam. In spring, Černý mostly came on as a substitute, appearing in a total of 18 league matches whilst scoring one goal.

==== 2022–23 season ====
Černý started the 2022–23 season in great form, having scored five goals in nine matches by early September. He scored twice in a 2–1 victory over PSV Eindhoven and once in a 4–0 victory against SBV Excelsior. Twente was again competing for a European qualification spot in the league. In mid-May, the team from Enschede achieved a significant 4–0 victory against Nijmegen, with Černý scoring the opening goal, assisting two more, and receiving applause from fans upon substitution. This marked his twelfth goal of the season. Černý had an outstanding season in the Dutch league, amassing 14 goals and 13 assists. His contributions helped Twente secure a place in the UEFA Europa Conference League for the following season.

=== Vfl Wolfsburg and loan to Rangers ===
On 23 June 2023, VfL Wolfsburg announced the signing of Černý on a four-year contract. The same year on 3 November, he scored his first Bundesliga goal in a 2–2 draw against Werder Bremen.

On 26 July 2024, Rangers announced Černý on a one-year loan. On 10 August, he scored his first goal for Rangers against Motherwell at Hampden Stadium. On 6 October, Černý scored his first brace for Rangers in their 2–0 victory St Johnstone at Ibrox. Skilful, popular with the fans and hard working Černý was a contender for player of the season.

=== Beşiktaş ===
On 2 September 2025, Černý joined Beşiktaş on a permanent three-year deal with an option for another year.

== International career ==
=== Youth ===
Černý represented Czech national youth football teams from the under-16 level. He was called up to the Czech Republic under-21 team in August 2015 at the age of 17. This call-up drew media attention as if Černý played in the against Latvia or Malta in early September, he would become the youngest player to represent the team. Černý made his U21 debut on 4 September, starting in the 4–1 victory against Malta.

=== Senior ===
Černý was first called up to the Czech senior national team on 9 November 2020, and debuted for the Czech senior national team on 11 November 2020 in a friendly match against Germany. He started and was substituted at half-time in the 1–0 loss.

After missing out the UEFA Euro 2020 due to health issues, Černý returned to the national team in June 2022 for the 2022–23 UEFA Nations League A matches against Spain, Switzerland, and Portugal. He played only half an hour against the former and assisted on Jan Kuchta's goal, ending in a 2–2 draw.

On 17 November 2022, Černý scored his first goal in a UEFA Euro 2024 qualifying match against Faroe Islands, ending in a 5–0 victory for the Czech Republic.

On 10 July 2026, Černý announced his retirement from international football, citing personal reasons.

== Style of play ==
Former manager of VfL Wolfsburg, Niko Kovač, described Černý as a left-footed player with speed and technical skills.

== Personal life ==
Černý's father, also named Václav, was the head coach of FK Příbram.

== Career statistics ==
=== Club ===
As of match played 19 September 2026

Appearances and goals by club, season and competition
Club	Season	League			National cup (Note: Includes KNVB Cup, DFB-Pokal, Scottish Cup, Turkish Cup)		League cup (Note: Includes Scottish League Cup)		Europe		Other		Total	
Club	Season	Division	Apps	Goals	Apps	Goals	Apps	Goals	Apps	Goals	Apps	Goals	Apps	Goals
Jong Ajax	2014–15	Eerste Divisie	1	0	—		—		—		—		1	0
Jong Ajax	2015–16	Eerste Divisie	17	5	—		—		—		—		17	5
Jong Ajax	2016–17	Eerste Divisie	28	15	—		—		—		—		28	15
Jong Ajax	2017–18	Eerste Divisie	1	1	—		—		—		—		1	1
Jong Ajax	2018–19	Eerste Divisie	22	10	—		—		—		—		22	10
Jong Ajax	Total		69	31	—		—		—		—		69	31
Ajax	2015–16	Eredivisie	7	1	0	0	—		2 (Note: Appearance(s) in UEFA Europa League)	1	—		9	2
Ajax	2016–17	Eredivisie	5	0	3	1	—		2 (Note: One appearance in UEFA Champions League, one appearance in UEFA Europa League)	0	—		10	1
Ajax	2017–18	Eredivisie	4	0	2	1	—		1	0	—		7	1
Ajax	2018–19	Eredivisie	0	0	3	0	—		0	0	—		3	0
Ajax	Total		16	1	8	2	—		5	1	—		29	4
Utrecht	2019–20	Eredivisie	13	0	1	0	—		2	0	—		16	0
Jong Utrecht	2019–20	Eerste Divisie	3	2	—		—		—		—		3	2
Twente (loan)	2020–21	Eredivisie	16	6	1	0	—		—		—		17	6
Twente	2021–22	Eredivisie	18	1	2	0	—		—		—		20	1
Twente	2022–23	Eredivisie	32	13	1	0	—		4 (Note: Appearances in UEFA Europa Conference League)	1	4 (Note: Appearances in Eredivisie European play-offs)	1	41	15
Twente	Total		50	14	3	0	—		4	1	4	1	61	16
VfL Wolfsburg	2023–24	Bundesliga	22	4	3	1	—		—		—		25	5
VfL Wolfsburg	2025–26	Bundesliga	2	0	1	1	—		—		—		3	1
VfL Wolfsburg	Total		24	4	4	2	—		—		—		28	6
Rangers (loan)	2024–25	Scottish Premiership	33	12	1	0	4	0	14 (Note: Two appearances in UEFA Champions League, twelve appearances and six goals in UEFA Europa League)	6	—		52	18
Beşiktaş	2025–26	Süper Lig	30	5	4	2	—		—		—		34	7
Beşiktaş	2026–27	Süper Lig	5	2	0	0	—		7	2	—		12	4
Beşiktaş	Total		35	7	4	2	—		7	2	—		46	11
Career total			259	77	22	6	4	0	32	10	4	1	321	94

=== International ===
As of match played 12 October 2025

Appearances and goals by national team and year
National team	Year	Apps	Goals
Czech Republic	2020	2	0
Czech Republic	2022	6	2
Czech Republic	2023	7	3
Czech Republic	2024	7	1
Czech Republic	2025	8	2
Total		30	8

Scores and results list Czech Republic's goal tally first, score column indicates score after each Černý goal.

List of international goals scored by Václav Černý
No.	Date	Venue	Opponent	Score	Result	Competition
1	16 November 2022	Andrův stadion, Olomouc, Czech Republic	Faroe Islands	4–0	5–0	Friendly
2	19 November 2022	Gaziantep Stadium, Gaziantep, Turkey	Turkey	1–1	2–1	Friendly
3	17 June 2023	Tórsvøllur, Tórshavn, Faroe Islands	Faroe Islands	2–0	3–0	UEFA Euro 2024 qualifying
4	17 June 2023	Tórsvøllur, Tórshavn, Faroe Islands	Faroe Islands	3–0	3–0	UEFA Euro 2024 qualifying
5	7 September 2023	Eden Arena, Prague, Czech Republic	Albania	1–0	1–1	UEFA Euro 2024 qualifying
6	7 June 2024	Untersberg-Arena, Grödig, Austria	Malta	7–1	7–1	Friendly
7	25 March 2025	Estádio Algarve, Faro/Loulé, Portugal	Gibraltar	1–0	4–0	2026 FIFA World Cup qualification
8.	5 September 2025	Podgorica City Stadium, Podgorica, Montenegro	Montenegro	2–0	2–0	2026 FIFA World Cup qualification

== Honours ==
Ajax

- Eredivisie: 2018–19
- KNVB Cup: 2018–19
- UEFA Europa League runner-up: 2016–17

Jong Ajax

- Eerste Divisie: 2017–18

Individual

- Czech Talent of the Year: 2015
- Eredivisie Player of the Month: May 2023
- Eredivisie Team of the Month: May 2023
