= Daan Rots =

Dutch footballer (born 2001)

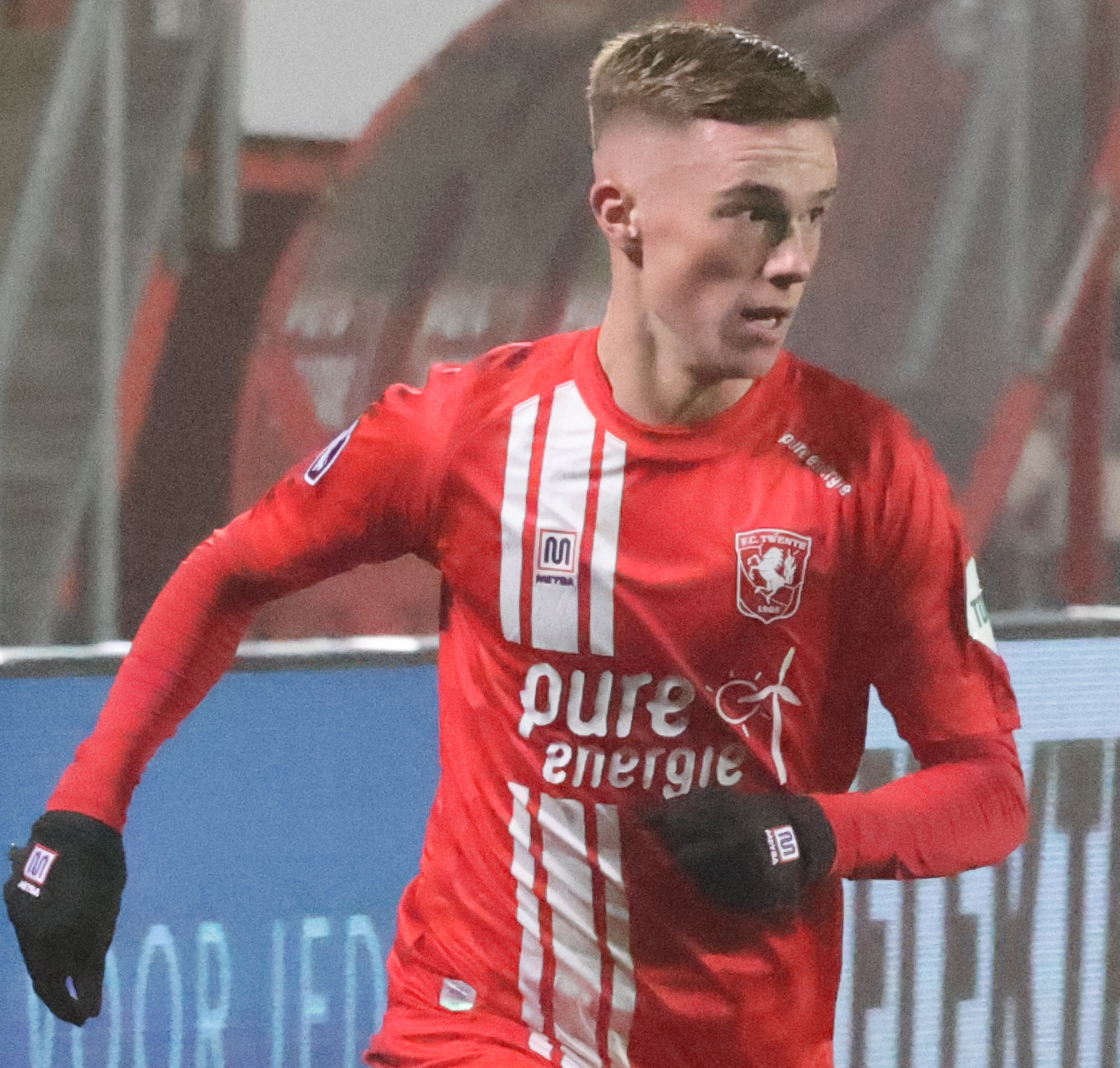

Personal information
- Date of birth: 25 July 2001 (age 25)
- Place of birth: Groenlo, Netherlands
- Height: 1.79 m (5 ft 10 in)
- Position: Winger

Team information
- Current team: Twente
- Number: 11

Youth career
- 2012–2021: Twente

Senior career*
Years	Team	Apps	(Gls)
2021–	Twente	171	(24)
- * Club domestic league appearances and goals as of 25 October 2026

Daan Rots (born 25 July 2001) is a Dutch professional footballer who plays as a winger for Eredivisie club Twente.

== Club career ==
Rots made his professional debut with Twente in a 4–1 Eredivisie win over FC Emmen on 9 January 2021. On 17 February 2021, he signed his first professional contract with Twente for 2+1 years.

Rots became a starter during the 2021–22 season in which the club finished fourth in the league and qualified for the 2022–23 UEFA Europa Conference League. He contributed with three goals in 30 appearances.

== Personal life ==
Daan is the older brother of the Dutch footballer Mats Rots.

== Career statistics ==
As of match played 25 October 2026

Appearances and goals by club, season and competition
Club	Season	League			Cup		Europe		Other		Total	
Club	Season	Division	Apps	Goals	Apps	Goals	Apps	Goals	Apps	Goals	Apps	Goals
Twente	2020–21	Eredivisie	11	1	0	0	—		—		11	1
Twente	2021–22	Eredivisie	27	3	3	0	—		—		30	3
Twente	2022–23	Eredivisie	24	0	1	2	4 (Note: Appearances in UEFA Conference League)	1	—		29	3
Twente	2023–24	Eredivisie	33	7	1	0	6	2	—		40	9
Twente	2024–25	Eredivisie	34	3	2	0	9 (Note: Appearances in UEFA Europa League)	2	—		45	5
Twente	2025–26	Eredivisie	33	9	4	1	—		—		37	10
Twente	2026–27	Eredivisie	9	1	0	0	8 (Note: Two appearances in UEFA Europa League, six appearances and one goal in UEFA Conference League)	1	—		17	2
Career total			171	24	11	3	27	6	0	0	209	33

== Honours ==
Individual

- Eredivisie Team of the Month: January 2025
