= Dimitrios Limnios =

Greek footballer (born 1998)

Dimitris Limnios
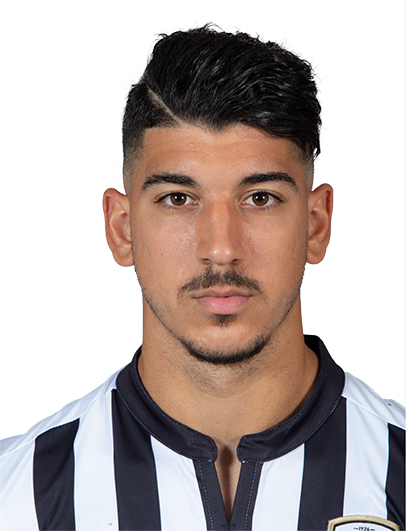
- Limnios with PAOK in 2017

Personal information
- Full name: Dimitrios Limnios
- Date of birth: 27 May 1998 (age 28)
- Place of birth: Volos, Greece
- Height: 1.78 m (5 ft 10 in)
- Position: Winger

Team information
- Current team: APOEL
- Number: 18

Youth career
- 2002–2012: Niki Volos
- 2012–2014: Atromitos

Senior career*
Years	Team	Apps	(Gls)
2014–2017	Atromitos	34	(1)
2017–2020	PAOK	76	(5)
2020–2023	1. FC Köln	14	(0)
2021–2022	→ Twente (loan)	33	(8)
2024–2026	Panathinaikos	23	(0)
2025–2026	→ Fortuna Sittard (loan)	34	(2)
2026–	APOEL	0	(0)

International career^{‡}
2014	Greece U16	1	(0)
2014–2015	Greece U17	16	(3)
2015–2017	Greece U19	15	(3)
2017–2019	Greece U21	12	(3)
2018–	Greece	26	(3)
- * Club domestic league appearances and goals as of 30 June 2026 ‡ National team caps and goals as of 11 June 2024

Dimitrios Limnios (Greek: Δημήτριος Λημνιός; born 27 May 1998) is a Greek professional footballer who plays as a winger for Dutch Eredivisie club Fortuna Sittard, on loan from Panathinaikos, and the Greece national team.

== Club career ==
=== Early career ===
Born in Volos, Limnios started his football career at home-town club Niki Volos, before joining the youth academy of Atromitos in 2012.

=== Atromitos ===
In 2014, Limnios was called up to the Atromitos first team. At the age of 16, on 16 October 2014, he made his Super League Greece debut against Ergotelis at Peristeri Stadium, replacing Andreas Tatos in the 84th minute. He became the third-youngest player to ever appear in the Greek top-tier (after Kyriakos Papadopoulos and Kostas Antoniou); he later made his European debut against AIK in the Europa League second qualifying round.

On 4 December 2016, Limnios scored his first goal for Atromitos in a 2–1 away league win over AEL.

=== PAOK ===
On 6 April 2017, Atromitos announced that they had reached an agreement for the permanent transfer of Limnios to fellow Greek club PAOK, starting from the 2017–18 season, for a reported fee of €900,000 and a 15% sell-on clause on future sales.

On 20 August 2017, Limnios made his debut for PAOK, starting in a goalless away draw against Levadiakos. On 29 November, he scored his first goal in a 5–0 away Greek Cup win against Aiginiakos. On 8 August 2018, he scored a goal in a 3–2 home win over Spartak Moscow in the UEFA Champions League third qualifying round. On 29 October, he scored just 30 seconds after replacing Diego Biseswar in the second half of a 2–0 home win over Panathinaikos.

On 29 August 2019, he scored a goal in a 3–2 win over Slovan Bratislava in the second leg of the UEFA Europa League play-offs; however, Slovan progressed on away goals due to the final 3–3 score on aggregate.

=== 1. FC Köln ===
On 7 September 2020, 1. FC Köln reached an agreement with PAOK to sign Limnios on a four-year contract, for a reported fee of €3.3 million. The Greek Super League side also obtained a 15% sell-on clause of any future transfer. Köln officially announced the arrival of Limnios two weeks later.

In August 2021, Limnios was sent out on a season-long loan to Dutch club Twente. On 23 September 2021, he scored his first goal for the club in a 3–1 home league win over AZ Alkmaar. He scored eight goals and two assists in 33 appearances for Twente.

On 25 February 2023, he returned to action with Köln's reserve team, eight and a half months after suffering an ACL injury.

=== Panathinaikos ===
On 29 December 2023, Limnios joined Greek Super League club Panathinaikos on a permanent deal, signing a contract until June 2027.

On 21 February 2024, Limnios scored a goal in the 120+9 minute to force the Greek Cup semifinal against PAOK to go to penalties, where Panathinaikos ended up winning and advancing to the final.

==== Loan to Fortuna Sittard ====
On 16 July 2025, Limnios returned to the Netherlands and joined Fortuna Sittard on loan with an option to buy.

== International career ==
Limnios has represented his country at various age groups. He was capped for Greece at Under-19 level. It was while on international duty, scoring a hat-trick against Moldova U19, that he was spotted by U.C. Sampdoria. He visited the Serie A club for a week's training in 2014.

He was a member of Greece U17 national team in the 2015 UEFA European Under-17 Championship. In the competition, he played nine games and scored two goals including qualification round. Since March 2016, he has been member of Greece national under-19 football team and played in 2017 UEFA European Under-19 Championship qualification. On 16 March 2018, he called up to the Greece national team by Michael Skibbe for the friendly match against Switzerland on 23 March 2018.

On 15 November 2019, Limnios scored the only goal of the game after 35 minutes of the UEFA Euro 2020 qualifier against Armenia. On 9 June 2022, Limnios at the last minute of a 2022–23 UEFA Nations League game against Cyprus suffered a cruciate ligament rupture, and according to doctors' estimations will be out for at least six to seven months.

== Personal life ==
Limnios' father, Stelios, played for Niki Volos. His mother is named Aide-Silva Barreto and is from Bahia, Brazil.

== Career statistics ==
=== Club ===
As of 15 May 2026

Appearances and goals by club, season and competition
Club	Season	League			National cup (Note: Includes Greek Football Cup, DFB-Pokal, KNVB Cup)		Europe		Total	
Club	Season	Division	Apps	Goals	Apps	Goals	Apps	Goals	Apps	Goals
Atromitos	2014–15	Super League Greece	1	0	1	0	–		2	0
Atromitos	2015–16	Super League Greece	8	0	5	0	1 (Note: Appearance in UEFA Europa League)	0	14	0
Atromitos	2016–17	Super League Greece	25	1	7	0	—		32	1
Atromitos	Total		34	1	13	0	1	0	48	1
PAOK	2017–18	Super League Greece	21	0	9	1	1	0	31	1
PAOK	2018–19	Super League Greece	20	1	7	1	10 (Note: Six appearances and one goal in UEFA Champions League, four appearances in UEFA Europa League)	1	37	3
PAOK	2019–20	Super League Greece	35	4	5	1	3 (Note: Two appearances in UEFA Champions League, one appearance and one goal in UEFA Europa League)	1	43	6
PAOK	2020–21	Super League Greece	0	0	0	0	1 (Note: Appearance in UEFA Champions League)	0	1	0
PAOK	Total		76	5	21	3	15	2	112	10
1. FC Köln	2020–21	Bundesliga	12	0	1	0	—		13	0
1. FC Köln	2022–23	Bundesliga	2	0	0	0	—		2	0
1. FC Köln	Total		14	0	1	0	—		15	0
FC Twente (loan)	2021–22	Eredivisie	33	8	3	0	—		36	8
1. FC Köln II	2022–23	Regionalliga West	6	0	—		—		6	0
Panathinaikos	2023–24	Super League Greece	12	0	1	1	—		13	1
Panathinaikos	2024–25	Super League Greece	11	0	2	0	4	0	17	0
Panathinaikos	Total		23	0	3	1	4	0	30	1
Fortuna Sittard (loan)	2025–26	Eredivisie	33	2	2	0	—		35	2
Career total			219	16	43	4	20	2	282	22

=== International ===
Scores and results list Greece's goal tally first, score column indicates score after each Limnios goal.

List of international goals scored by Dimitris Limnios
No.	Date	Venue	Opponent	Score	Result	Competition
1	15 November 2019	Vazgen Sargsyan Republican Stadium, Yerevan, Armenia	Armenia	1–0	1–0	UEFA Euro 2020 qualification
2	6 September 2020	Fadil Vokrri Stadium, Pristina, Kosovo	Kosovo	1–0	2–1	2020–21 UEFA Nations League C
3	9 June 2022	Panthessaliko Stadium, Volos, Greece	Cyprus	3–0	3–0	2022–23 UEFA Nations League C

== Honours ==
PAOK

- Super League Greece: 2018–19
- Greek Cup: 2017–18, 2018–19

Panathinaikos

- Greek Cup: 2023–24

Individual

- Eredivisie Team of the Month: May 2022,
