= Joep van de Rande =

Dutch footballer (born 1997)

Personal information
- Date of birth: 3 February 1997 (age 29)
- Place of birth: Schaijk, Netherlands
- Height: 1.87 m (6 ft 2 in)
- Position: Centre-back

Team information
- Current team: Rosmalen
- Number: 3

Youth career
- –2008: DAW
- 2008–2009: RKC Waalwijk
- 2009–2017: Willem II

Senior career*
Years	Team	Apps	(Gls)
2017–2018	FC Oss	1	(0)
2018–2023	OSS '20	85	(4)
2023–	Rosmalen	12	(1)
- * Club domestic league appearances and goals as of 14:23, 6 October 2024 (UTC)

Joep van de Rande (born 3 February 1997) is a Dutch footballer who plays as a centre-back for Derde Divisie club Rosmalen.

== Club career ==
In his youth, Van de Rande began his football journey with DAW, subsequently transitioning to the youth ranks of RKC Waalwijk. After a season, RKC's youth academy amalgamated with that of Willem II. Following the dissolution of the joint venture in 2014, Van de Rande opted to continue his development within the youth system of Willem II. In 2017, he made a move to FC Oss, marking his debut in professional football on 25 August 2017, during the home fixture against Volendam, which ended in a 1–0 victory. Van de Rande entered the pitch in the 94th minute, replacing Fatih Kamaçi.

In 2018, Van de Rande transferred to amateur club OSS '20. He played there for five years, making 85 Derde Divisie appearances, in which he scored four goals. He announced his departure from the club in May 2023, instead opting to sign with OJC Rosmalen.
