= Thijs van Leeuwen =

Dutch footballer (born 2001)

Personal information
- Date of birth: 15 July 2001 (age 25)
- Place of birth: Heerde, Netherlands
- Height: 1.75 m (5 ft 9 in)
- Position: Midfielder

Team information
- Current team: RKC Waalwijk
- Number: 10

Youth career
- –2011: VV Heerde
- 2011–2019: Twente

Senior career*
Years	Team	Apps	(Gls)
2019–2023	Twente	21	(3)
2021–2022	→ Almere City (loan)	22	(1)
2023–2024	TOP Oss	41	(1)
2024–2026	Den Bosch	58	(8)
2026–	RKC Waalwijk	9	(1)
- * Club domestic league appearances and goals as of 3 October 2026

Thijs van Leeuwen (born 15 July 2001) is a Dutch professional footballer who plays as a midfielder for Eerste Divisie club RKC Waalwijk.

== Club career ==
Van Leeuwen made his professional debut as part of Twente on 12 September 2020, coming on as a substitute for Queensy Menig in a 2–0 win over Fortuna Sittard in the Eredivisie. In October 2020, Van Leeuwen signed a new contract with Twente until 2023 with an option for an additional year. He scored his first goal on 7 November in a 4–2 away win over ADO Den Haag, securing the result deep into stoppage time.

Van Leeuwen joined Eerste Divisie club Almere City on 31 August 2021 on loan for the 2021–22 season.

On 31 January 2023, van Leeuwen signed a year-and-a-half-long contract with TOP Oss. He made his debut for the club on 3 February, starting in a 3–0 derby win over Den Bosch. Two weeks later, on 17 February, he scored his first goal for TOP, helping them past Eindhoven with a 2–0 victory.

On 16 May 2024, Van Leeuwen was announced as league rival Den Bosch's new signing ahead of the 2024–25 season. He signed a two-year contract with an option for an additional year.

In the summer of 2026, Van Leeuwen signed a two-season contract with RKC Waalwijk.

== Career statistics ==
As of match played 10 May 2024

Appearances and goals by club, season and competition
Club	Season	League			KNVB Cup		Other		Total	
Club	Season	Division	Apps	Goals	Apps	Goals	Apps	Goals	Apps	Goals
Twente	2020–21	Eredivisie	21	3	0	0	—		21	3
Almere City (loan)	2021–22	Eerste Divisie	22	1	1	0	—		23	1
TOP Oss	2022–23	Eerste Divisie	13	1	0	0	—		13	1
TOP Oss	2023–24	Eerste Divisie	28	0	1	0	—		29	0
TOP Oss	Total		41	1	1	0	—		42	1
Den Bosch	2024–25	Eerste Divisie	0	0	0	0	—		0	0
Career total			84	5	2	0	0	0	86	5
