= Pol van Boekel =

Dutch football referee (born 1975)

Personal information
- Full name: Paulus Hendrikus Martinus van Boekel
- Date of birth: 19 September 1975 (age 51)
- Place of birth: Vierlingsbeek, Netherlands
- Position: Defender

Senior career*
Years	Team	Apps	(Gls)
1994–2000	VVV	127	(8)
- * Club domestic league appearances and goals

Pol van Boekel
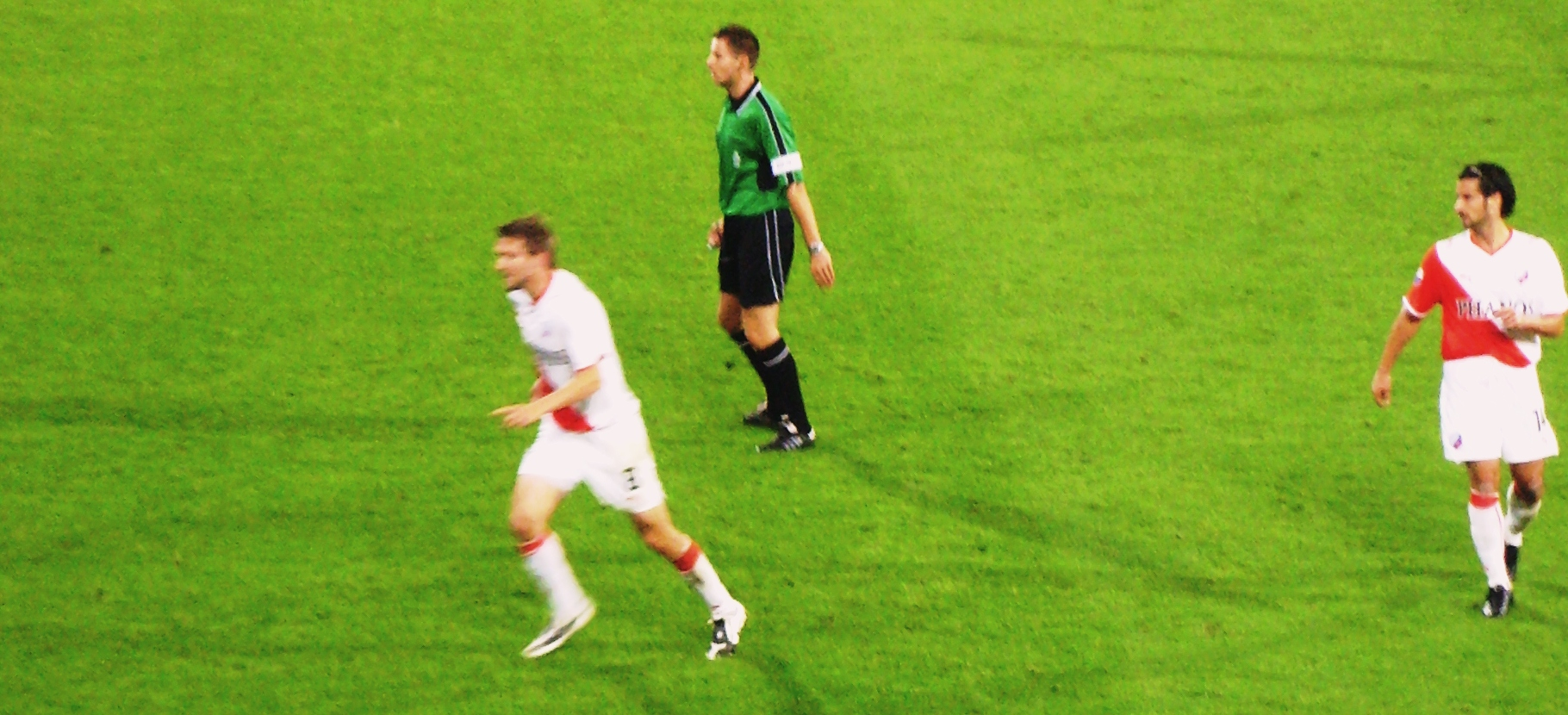
- Pol van Boekel (center) in 2007

Domestic
Years	League	Role

International
Years	League	Role
2008–	FIFA listed	Referee

Paulus Hendrikus Martinus van Boekel (born 19 July 1975) is a Dutch international football referee.

Van Boekel also played football professionally himself, six seasons with Eerste Divisie club VVV.

He refereed at the 2014 FIFA World Cup qualifiers, beginning with the match between Moldova and England.

Van Boekel became a FIFA referee in 2008.

== Controversial calls ==
On 7 July 2021, he was the video assistant referee (VAR) for the Euro 2020 semifinal match between England and Denmark. Controversially, he chose to uphold referee Danny Makkelie's decision to award a penalty for a foul on Raheem Sterling of England.

On 26 October 2022 he was the video assistant referee (VAR) for the 2022–2023 UEFA Champions League Group stage match between Tottenham Hotspur and Sporting CP, he controversially ruled out Harry Kane's injury time winner which would have meant Tottenham went through to the round of 16 in the Champions league.

On 12 October 2023 he was the video assistant referee (VAR) for the Euro 2024 Qualifying match between Spain and Scotland; he controversially ruled out Scott McTominay's free kick goal that put Scotland 1-0 ahead for, initially, a foul on the goalkeeper, before changing the decision to offside.
