= Casper Staring =

Dutch footballer (born 2001)

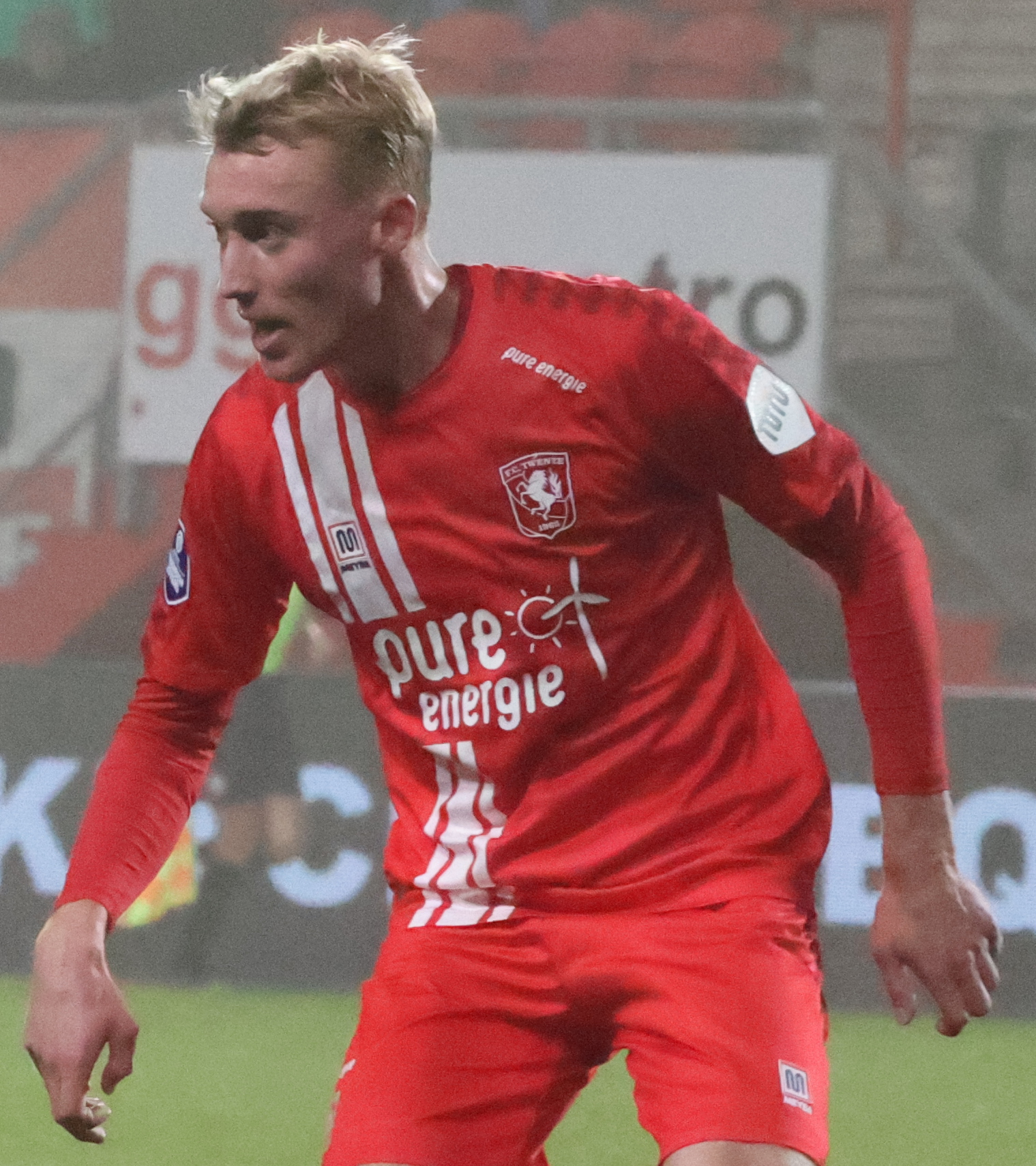
- Staring with Twente

Personal information
- Date of birth: 1 February 2001 (age 25)
- Place of birth: Barneveld, Netherlands
- Height: 1.86 m (6 ft 1 in)
- Position: Midfielder

Team information
- Current team: Emmen
- Number: 6

Youth career
- Twente

Senior career*
Years	Team	Apps	(Gls)
2020–2023	Twente	10	(0)
2023–2026	NAC Breda	65	(0)
2026–	Emmen	15	(1)
- * Club domestic league appearances and goals as of 28 April 2026

Casper Staring (born 1 February 2001) is a Dutch professional footballer who plays as a midfielder for Eerste Divisie club Emmen.

== Career ==
In January 2023, Staring signed a three-and-a-half-year contract with NAC Breda.

On 3 February 2026, Staring moved to Emmen on a two-and-a-half-year deal.
