= Queensy Menig =

Dutch footballer (born 1995)

Personal information
- Full name: Queensy Miquel Saymon Wensley Menig
- Date of birth: 19 August 1995 (age 31)
- Place of birth: Amsterdam, Netherlands
- Height: 1.74 m (5 ft 9 in)
- Position: Winger

Youth career
- 2007–2014: Ajax

Senior career*
Years	Team	Apps	(Gls)
2014–2017	Ajax	3	(0)
2014–2017	Jong Ajax	30	(11)
2015–2017	→ PEC Zwolle (loan)	66	(15)
2017–2019	Nantes	0	(0)
2017–2018	→ Oldham Athletic (loan)	14	(1)
2018	→ PEC Zwolle (loan)	13	(1)
2019–2021	Twente	46	(9)
2021–2024	Partizan	78	(18)
2024–2025	Sivasspor	26	(4)

International career
2012	Netherlands U17	5	(0)
2012	Netherlands U19	1	(1)
2015	Netherlands U21	2	(0)
Medal record
Men's football
Representing Netherlands
UEFA European Under-17 Championship
Winner	2012
- * Club domestic league appearances and goals as of 24 August 2025

Queensy Miquel Saymon Wensley Menig (born 19 August 1995) is a Dutch professional footballer who plays as a winger.

== Club career ==
=== Ajax ===
On 6 June 2012, Menig signed a three-year contract with Ajax, tying him down to the club until 30 June 2015. On 11 August 2014, he marked his debut for the reserves team Jong Ajax with two goals in an Eerste Divisie match against Telstar. He made his first team debut in the KNVB Cup in the first official Amsterdam derby to be contested since 1983, scoring on his debut against JOS Watergraafsmeer in the Olympic Stadium. The match ended in a 9–0 victory for Ajax, with Menig scoring in the 70th minute of the match. In October 2014, Menig extended his contract with Ajax until 2019. He made his league debut for the clubs' first team on 6 December 2014, coming on as a 76th-minute substitute in the 5–0 win at home against Willem II.

=== Nantes ===
On 31 August 2017, it was announced that Menig had transferred to the French Ligue 1 side FC Nantes, who in turn immediately loaned him out to EFL League One Oldham Athletic on a season long loan spell.

Menig was loaned out once again, this time to his former club PEC Zwolle, for the rest of the season.

=== Twente ===
On 9 September 2019, he returned to the Netherlands, signing a two-year contract with one-year extension option with Twente. On 12 September, he made his debut for the club in a home match against Fortuna Sittard, scoring the 1–0 goal after an assist from Jayden Oosterwolde, as Twente won 2–0. On 5 December 2020 he scored both goals in an impressive 1–2 win away against his former club Ajax.

=== Partizan ===
On 2 September 2021 Menig signed a three-year deal with Partizan. The former Ajax academy graduate signed to Partizan from Twente for a fee around €700,000. Menig scored his first goal for Partizan in his full debut against Anorthosis Famagusta, in Round 1 of UEFA Europa Conference League Menig was voted Player of the Week 11 in Serbian SuperLiga after recording two assists and a goal in a 5–0 victory against Spartak Subotica. In the 17th round of the domestic championship, Menig scored a goal in a 4–1 victory over rivals Vojvodina. Queensy Menig started a solo action, ran towards the goal of Vojvodina and eventually shot past four players. He scored the winning goal in a 1–0 away victory over Sparta Prague in the Europa Conference League knockout round play-offs. On 25 October 2023, Menig made his 100th appearance in the Partizan jersey in a 4–0 win against Radnički Kragujevac.

=== Sivasspor ===
On 9 February 2024, Menig joined Sivasspor in Turkey on a two-and-a-half-year deal.

== Personal life ==
Born in the Netherlands, Menig is of Surinamese descent.

== Career statistics ==
As of match played 31 May 2024

Appearances and goals by club, season and competition
Club	Season	League			Domestic Cup		League Cup		Continental		Other		Total	
Club	Season	Division	Apps	Goals	Apps	Goals	Apps	Goals	Apps	Goals	Apps	Goals	Apps	Goals
Jong Ajax	2014–15	Eerste Divisie	30	11	–		–		–		0	0	30	11
Ajax	2014–15	Eredivisie	3	0	2	1	–		0	0	0	0	5	1
PEC Zwolle (loan)	2015–16	Eredivisie	35	6	1	0	–		–		0	0	36	6
PEC Zwolle (loan)	2016–17	Eredivisie	31	9	2	0	–		–		0	0	33	9
PEC Zwolle (loan)	Total		66	15	3	0	0	0	0	0	0	0	69	15
Nantes	2017–18	Ligue 1	0	0	0	0	0	0	–		0	0	0	0
Oldham Athletic (loan)	2017–18	League One	14	1	1	0	1	0	–		0	0	16	1
PEC Zwolle (loan)	2017–18	Eredivisie	13	1	0	0	–		–		0	0	13	1
FC Twente	2019–20	Eredivisie	11	1	2	0	–		–		0	0	13	1
FC Twente	2020–21	Eredivisie	32	8	1	0	–		–		0	0	33	8
FC Twente	2021–22	Eredivisie	3	0	0	0	–		–		0	0	3	0
FC Twente	Total		46	9	3	0	0	0	0	0	0	0	49	9
Partizan	2021–22	Serbian SuperLiga	30	6	4	3	–		10	2	0	0	44	11
Partizan	2022–23	Serbian SuperLiga	33	7	0	0	–		10	2	0	0	43	9
Partizan	2023–24	Serbian SuperLiga	15	2	2	0	–		4	0	0	0	21	2
Partizan	Total		78	15	6	3	–		24	4	0	0	108	22
Sivasspor	2023–24	Süper Lig	11	2	0	0	–		–		0	0	11	2
Career total			262	54	15	4	1	0	24	4	0	0	301	62

== Honours ==
Netherlands U17

- UEFA European Under-17 Football Championship: 2012

Individual

- Best player of AEGON Future Cup: 2012
