= 2026–27 FC Twente season =

Dutch football club season

Twente
2026–27 season
- Chairman: Dominique Scholten
- Manager: John van den Brom
- Stadium: De Grolsch Veste
- Eredivisie: 4th
- KNVB Cup: Second round
- UEFA Europa League: Second qualifying round
- UEFA Conference League: League phase
- Top goalscorer: League: All: Wout Weghorst (12)
- Highest home attendance: 29,500 (vs PEC Zwolle, 16 August 2026)
- Lowest home attendance: 27,500 (vs Ferencváros, 23 July 2026)
- Average home league attendance: 27,500
- Biggest win: 9–0 Excelsior (A)
- Biggest defeat: 1–2 Ferencváros (H)
Home colours	Away colours	Third colours
- All statistics correct as of 10 November 2026.

The 2026–27 season is the 62nd season in the history of FC Twente and the club's eighth consecutive season in the Eredivisie, the top tier of Dutch football. In addition to the domestic league, Twente are competing in the KNVB Cup and the UEFA Conference League, having previously competed in the UEFA Europa League.

== Season events ==
On 6 January 2026, FC Twente announced that former player and manager Erik ten Hag would become the club's technical director from the start of the 2026–27 season, succeeding Jan Streuer. Ten Hag joined the club's football organisation on 1 February ahead of formally taking over the role.

On 27 March 2026, Twente extended the contract of head coach John van den Brom until mid-2027, meaning he remained in charge for the start of the 2026–27 season.

At the end of the 2025–26 season, striker Ricky van Wolfswinkel retired from professional football. The 37-year-old had joined Twente in 2021 and made 186 appearances across all competitions for the club, scoring 62 goals.

On 9 June 2026, Mats Rots left Twente to join 1899 Hoffenheim, with reports stating that the transfer fee was around €16 million, which would make it a club-record sale for Twente.

On 27 June 2026, Twente announced the signing of Dutch international striker Wout Weghorst on a two-year contract.

On 20 July 2026, Ramiz Zerrouki returned to Twente on a permanent transfer from Feyenoord, signing a four-year contract after spending the previous season on loan at the club.

On 30 July 2026, Twente were eliminated by Ferencváros in the second qualifying round of the 2026–27 UEFA Europa League. They subsequently entered the 2026–27 UEFA Conference League in the third qualifying round, where they were drawn against DAC 1904.

On 11 August 2026, Twente signed Norwegian winger Filip Thorvaldsen from Vålerenga on a five-year contract. The transfer fee was reportedly around €5.5 million, with additional bonuses potentially increasing the total amount.

On 24 August 2026, Twente extended the contract of Norwegian winger Sondre Ørjasæter by one year, keeping him at the club until mid-2030. Ørjasæter had established himself as an important first-team player following his arrival in August 2025.

On 1 November 2026, Twente recorded their largest league win and equalled their largest ever competitive win after defeating Excelsior 9–0.

== Players ==
=== Squad ===
Players' ages are as of FC Twente's opening match of the 2026–27 Eredivisie season, 9 August 2026.

No.	Player	Nationality	Position	Date of birth (age)	Signed from	Signed in	Contract ends
Goalkeepers
1	Lars Unnerstall	(Germany)	GK	20 July 1990 (aged 36)	PSV	2021	2027
16	Joël Drommel	(Netherlands)	GK	16 November 1996 (aged 29)	PSV	2026	2030
22	Remko Pasveer	(Netherlands)	GK	8 November 1983 (aged 42)	Unattached	2026	2027
31	Yannick Gerritsen	(Netherlands)	GK	14 February 2006 (aged 20)	Academy	2025	2028
Defenders
2	Michał Rosiak	(Poland)	RB	12 October 2005 (aged 20)	Śląsk Wrocław	2026	2030 (+1)
3	Robin Pröpper	(Netherlands)	CB	23 September 1993 (aged 32)	Rangers	2025	2029
4	Ruud Nijstad	(Netherlands)	CB	17 January 2008 (aged 18)	Academy	2025	2029
23	Stav Lemkin	(Israel)	CB	2 April 2003 (aged 23)	Shakhtar Donetsk	2025	2028
24	Krzysztof Kurowski	(Poland)	LB	29 August 2006 (aged 19)	Śląsk Wrocław	2026	2030 (+1)
28	Bart van Rooij	(Netherlands)	RB	26 May 2001 (aged 25)	N.E.C.	2024	2028
29	Aske Adelgaard	(Denmark)	LB	10 November 2003 (aged 22)	Go Ahead Eagles	2026	2030 (+1)
38	Max Bruns	(Netherlands)	CB	6 November 2002 (aged 23)	Academy	2021	2029
Midfielders
6	Ramiz Zerrouki	(Algeria)	CM	26 May 1998 (aged 28)	Feyenoord	2026	2030
8	Daouda Weidmann	(France)	CM	4 May 2003 (aged 23)	RKC Waalwijk	2025	2030
14	Kristian Hlynsson	(Iceland)	AM	23 January 2004 (aged 22)	Ajax	2025	2029
18	Jordy Bawuah	(Belgium)	DM / CM	17 November 2006 (aged 19)	PSV	2026	2029 (+1)
20	Thomas van den Belt	(Netherlands)	DM / CM	18 June 2001 (aged 25)	Feyenoord	2025	2029
41	Gijs Besselink	(Netherlands)	CM	16 June 2004 (aged 22)	Academy	2023	2028
Attackers
7	Marko Pjaca	(Croatia)	LW	6 May 1995 (aged 31)	Dinamo Zagreb	2025	2027
9	Wout Weghorst	(Netherlands)	FW	7 August 1992 (aged 34)	Unattached	2026	2028
10	Younes Taha	(Morocco)	RW / AM	27 November 2002 (aged 23)	PEC Zwolle	2023	2029 (+1)
11	Daan Rots	(Netherlands)	RW	25 July 2001 (aged 25)	Academy	2021	2027
17	Filip Thorvaldsen	(Norway)	RW	15 April 2006 (aged 20)	Vålerenga	2026	2031
25	Lucas Vennegoor of Hesselink	(Netherlands)	FW	14 March 2006 (aged 20)	Academy	2025	2028
27	Sondre Ørjasæter	(Norway)	LW	28 November 2003 (aged 22)	Sarpsborg 08	2025	2030
37	Naci Ünüvar	(Turkey)	LW / AM	13 June 2003 (aged 23)	Ajax	2025	2028

== Transfers ==
=== In ===
Date	Pos.	Player	Transferred from	Fee	Ref.
24 June 2026	DF	(Poland) Krzysztof Kurowski	(Poland) Śląsk Wrocław	Undisclosed	
1 July 2026	DF	(Denmark) Aske Adelgaard	(Netherlands) Go Ahead Eagles	Undisclosed	
1 July 2026	FW	(Netherlands) Wout Weghorst	Unattached	Free transfer	
2 July 2026	GK	(Netherlands) Remko Pasveer	Unattached	Free transfer	
20 July 2026	MF	(Algeria) Ramiz Zerrouki	(Netherlands) Feyenoord	Undisclosed	
4 August 2026	GK	(Netherlands) Joël Drommel	(Netherlands) PSV	Undisclosed	
11 August 2026	FW	(Norway) Filip Thorvaldsen	(Norway) Vålerenga	Undisclosed	
31 August 2026	MF	(Belgium) Jordy Bawuah	(Netherlands) PSV	Undisclosed	
2 September 2026	DF	(Poland) Michał Rosiak	(Poland) Śląsk Wrocław	Undisclosed	

=== Out ===
Date	Pos.	Player	To	Fee	Ref.
9 June 2026	DF	(Netherlands) Mats Rots	(Germany) 1899 Hoffenheim	€16 million	
24 June 2026	DF	(Netherlands) Bas Kuipers	(Netherlands) Sparta Rotterdam	Undisclosed	
25 June 2026	DF	(Belgium) Alec Van Hoorenbeeck	(Croatia) Hajduk Split	Undisclosed	
30 June 2026	FW	(Netherlands) Ricky van Wolfswinkel	Retired		
30 June 2026	GK	(Poland) Przemysław Tytoń	Released		
30 June 2026	MF	(Algeria) Ramiz Zerrouki	(Netherlands) Feyenoord	End of loan	
4 August 2026	MF	(Netherlands) Harrie Kuster	(Netherlands) Telstar	Undisclosed	
20 August 2026	FW	(Tunisia) Sayfallah Ltaief	(Poland) Cracovia	Undisclosed	
31 August 2026	DF	(Indonesia) Mees Hilgers	(Netherlands) SC Heerenveen	Undisclosed	
31 August 2026	MF	(Norway) Mathias Kjølø	(Norway) Rosenborg	Undisclosed	
1 September 2026	MF	(Belgium) Arno Verschueren	(Belgium) SK Beveren	Undisclosed	
2 September 2026	FW	(Netherlands) Sam Lammers	(Netherlands) PSV Eindhoven	€2 million	
2 September 2026	GK	(Morocco) Issam El Maach	Released		

=== Loans out ===
Start date	Pos.	Player	To	End date	Ref.
15 June 2026	GK	(Netherlands) Sam Karssies	(Netherlands) FC Emmen	15 June 2027	
2 September 2026	FW	(United States) Taylor Booth	(United States) Real Salt Lake	April 2027	
2 September 2026	DF	(Portugal) Guilherme Peixoto	(Netherlands) Roda JC	30 June 2027	

== Pre-season and friendlies ==
Win Draw Loss

27 June 2026 Friendly	Vroomshoopse Boys (Netherlands)	Cancelled	(Netherlands) Twente	Vroomshoop
18:00		Report		Stadium: Sportpark De Bosrand

4 July 2026 Friendly	Twente (Netherlands)	1–0	(Scotland) Aberdeen	Goor
14:00	Vennegoor of Hesselink 30'	Report		Stadium: Sportpark Heeckeren

11 July 2026 Friendly	Twente (Netherlands)	3–1	(Germany) SF Lotte	Tegelen
13:00		Report

11 July 2026 Friendly	Twente (Netherlands)	3–2	(Greece) PAOK	Tegelen
16:00	Ørjasæter 36'; Vennegoor of Hesselink 56'; Hlynsson 90+4'	Report	Nijstad 10' (o.g.); Jeremejeff 87'

18 July 2026 Friendly	Twente (Netherlands)	2–2	(Belgium) KAA Gent	Delden
13:00	Weghorst 7'; Vennegoor of Hesselink 66' (pen.)	Report	Kanga 2', 54'	Stadium: Sports Park Scheetheuvel

18 July 2026 Friendly	Twente (Netherlands)	0–2	(Belgium) KAA Gent	Delden
15:30		Report	Dean 22'; Kadri 70'	Stadium: Sports Park Scheetheuvel

24 July 2026 Friendly	FC Emmen (Netherlands)	0–3	(Netherlands) Twente	Coevorden
19:00		Report	Lammers 6', 18', 85'	Stadium: Sportpark De Pampert

2 August 2026 Friendly	KRC Genk (Belgium)	2–1	(Netherlands) Twente	Genk, Belgium
18:30	Heynen 7'; Ito 14'	Report	Pjaca 86'	Stadium: Cegeka Arena

== Competitions ==
=== Overall record ===
Competition	First match	Last match	Starting round	Record							
Competition	First match	Last match	Starting round	Pld	W	D	L	GF	GA	GD	Win %
Eredivisie	9 August 2026	May 2027	Matchday 1	12	7	3	2	30	12	+18	58.33
KNVB Cup	December 2026	TBD	Second round	0	0	0	0	0	0	+0	—
UEFA Europa League	23 July 2026	30 July 2026	Second qualifying round	2	0	1	1	3	4	−1	0.00
UEFA Conference League	6 August 2026	TBD	Third qualifying round	7	5	1	1	21	7	+14	71.43
Total				21	12	5	4	54	23	+31	57.14

Last updated: 8 November 2026
Source: Soccerway

=== Eredivisie ===
==== League table ====
Pos	Team	Pld	W	D	L	GF	GA	GD	Pts	Qualification or relegation
2	Feyenoord	12	7	4	1	36	17	+19	25	Qualification for the Champions League third qualifying round
3	Ajax	12	7	4	1	32	15	+17	25	Qualification for the Europa League second qualifying round
4	Twente	12	7	3	2	30	12	+18	24	Qualification for the European competition play-offs
5	AZ	12	7	2	3	24	16	+8	23	Qualification for the European competition play-offs
6	Heerenveen	12	6	3	3	24	16	+8	21	Qualification for the European competition play-offs

Updated to match(es) played on 8 November 2026. Source: Eredivisie
Rules for classification: 1) Points; 2) Less loss points; 3) Goal difference; 4) Goals scored; 5) Head-to-head points; 6) Head-to-head goal difference; 7) Head-to-head away goals scored; 9) Play-off if relevant for deciding champion, relegation or participating in a European league, otherwise by draw. 9) Penalty shoot-out (only after a play-off)

==== Results summary ====
Overall								Home						Away					
Pld	W	D	L	GF	GA	GD	Pts	W	D	L	GF	GA	GD	W	D	L	GF	GA	GD
12	7	3	2	30	12	+18	24	4	1	1	12	7	+5	3	2	1	18	5	+13

Last updated: 8 November 2026.
Source: Soccerway

==== Results by round ====
Round	1	2	3	4	5	6	7	8	9	10	11	12
Ground	A	H	A	A	H	H	H	A	H	A	A	H
Result	L	W	W	D	W	W	W	D	L	W	W	D
Position	13	11	11	7	5	6	4	4	5	4	4	4
Points	0	3	6	7	10	13	16	17	17	20	23	24

Source: Eredivisie
A = Away; H = Home; W = Win; D = Draw; L = Loss; P = Postponed

==== Matches ====
The Eredivisie fixtures were released on 16 June 2026.

Win Draw Loss Fixtures

9 August 2026 1	Heerenveen	1–0	Twente	Heerenveen
15:45 CEST	Oyen 52', (yellow card) 90+6'; Proper (yellow card) 75'	Report	Rots (yellow card) 90+5'	Stadium: Abe Lenstra Stadion; Attendance: 21,022; Referee: Marc Nagtegaal

16 August 2026 2	Twente	3–1	PEC Zwolle	Enschede
13:30 CEST	Weidmann 38'; Mbayo 59' (o.g.); Rots 69'	Report	Sørensen 21'	Stadium: De Grolsch Veste; Attendance: 29,500; Referee: Allard Lindhout

30 August 2026 3	SC Cambuur	1–4	Twente	Leeuwarden
19:00 CEST	Souren (yellow card) 39'; Hamache 88'	Report	Nijstad 22'; Weghorst 26'; Ørjasæter (yellow card) 40'; Pjaca 47'; Taha 82'	Stadium: Kooi Stadion; Attendance: 13,105; Referee: Erwin Blank

6 September 2026 4	Groningen	2–2	Twente	Groningen
11:15 CEST	Van Bergen 18'; Land 29'; Csinger (yellow card) 55'	Report	Pjaca 6'; Zerrouki (yellow card) 8'; Weghorst 40'	Stadium: Euroborg; Attendance: 21,435; Referee: Danny Makkelie

9 September 2026 5	Twente	1–0	Telstar	Enschede
17:45 CEST	Taha (yellow card) 23'; Ørjasæter 65'; Weghorst (penalty missed) 81'	Report	Þórisson (yellow card) 46'; Peersman (yellow card) 55'; Valk (yellow card) 62'	Stadium: De Grolsch Veste; Attendance: 29,000; Referee: Richard Martens

12 September 2026 6	Twente	2–0	ADO Den Haag	Enschede
15:30 CEST	Weghorst 61' (pen.); Pröpper 74'; Bruns (yellow card) 79'	Report	De Bruin (yellow card) 33'; Hawkins (yellow card) 50'; Sylla (yellow card) 87'	Stadium: De Grolsch Veste; Attendance: 29,000; Referee: Jannick Van Der Laan

20 September 2026 7	Twente	3–2	PSV	Enschede
14:30 CEST	Taha 14'; Weghorst (yellow card) 43', (goal) 79'; Weidmann 83'	Report	Til 26', 29'; Van Bommel (yellow card) 60'; Perišić (yellow card) 66'	Stadium: De Grolsch Veste; Attendance: 30,000; Referee: Serdar Gözübüyük

10 October 2026 8	Fortuna Sittard	1–1	Twente	Sittard-Geleen
20:00 CEST	Descotte 9'	Report	Pröpper 34'; Van Rooij (yellow card) 74'	Stadium: Fortuna Sittard Stadion; Attendance: 10,523; Referee: Robin Hensgens

18 October 2026 9	Twente	1–2	Utrecht	Enschede
20:00 CEST	Weidmann 28'	Report	Alarcón 47', 63'; Horemans (yellow card) 57'; van den Berg (yellow card) 70'	Stadium: De Grolsch Veste; Attendance: 28,500; Referee: Allard Lindhout

25 October 2026 10	AZ	0–2	Twente	Alkmaar
19:00 CEST	Daal (yellow card) 4'; Dijkstra (yellow card) 19'; Oufkir (yellow card) 70'	Report	Propper (yellow card) 43'; Weidmann (yellow card) 50' (yellow-red card) 88'; Ørjasæter 84'; Vennegoor of Hesselink 90+3'	Stadium: AFAS Stadion; Attendance: 18,838; Referee: Alex Bos

1 November 2026 11	Excelsior	0–9	Twente	Rotterdam
13:30 CET	Groen (red card) 5'; Hartjes (yellow card) 43'	Report	Weghorst (yellow card) 17', (goal) 12', 32', 33', 62' (pen.); van den Belt 39'; Rots 45+1', 82'; Bawuah 49'; Zerrouki 71' (pen.)	Stadium: Stadion Woudestein; Attendance: 4,600; Referee: Erwin Blank

8 November 2026 12	Twente	2–2	Ajax	Enschede
13:30 CET	Pröpper (yellow card) 60'; Janse 68' (o.g.); Weidmann (yellow card) 82'; Zerrouki (yellow card) 90+2'; Weghorst 90+5' (pen.)	Report	Arokodare (yellow card) 52', (goal) 3'; Rosa (yellow card) 35'; Bouwman (yellow card) 64'; Bounida 66'; Gloukh (yellow card) 70'; Wijndal (yellow card) 90+4'	Stadium: De Grolsch Veste; Attendance: 30,000; Referee: Joey Kooij

21 November 2026 13	Twente	v	Willem II	Enschede
TBC		Report		Stadium: De Grolsch Veste

28 November 2026 14	NEC	v	Twente	Nijmegen
TBC		Report		Stadium: Stadion de Goffert

5 December 2026 15	GA Eagles	v	Twente	Deventer
TBC		Report		Stadium: De Adelaarshorst

12 December 2026 16	Twente	v	Sparta	Enschede
TBC		Report		Stadium: De Grolsch Veste

19 December 2026 17	Feyenoord	v	Twente	Rotterdam
TBC		Report		Stadium: De Kuip

8 January 2027 18	Twente	v	Fortuna Sittard	Enschede
19:00 UTC+2		Report		Stadium: De Grolsch Veste

16 January 2027 19	Utrecht	v	Twente	Utrecht
TBC		Report		Stadium: Stadion Galgenwaard

23 January 2027 20	Twente	v	SC Heerenveen	Enschede
TBC		Report		Stadium: De Grolsch Veste

30 January 2027 21	Twente	v	SC Cambuur	Enschede
TBC		Report		Stadium: De Grolsch Veste

13 February 2027 22	PSV	v	Twente	Eindhoven
TBC		Report		Stadium: Philips Stadion

20 February 2027 23	Twente	v	Excelsior	Enschede
TBC		Report		Stadium: De Grolsch Veste

27 February 2027 24	ADO Den Haag	v	Twente	Den Haag
TBC		Report		Stadium: Bingoal Stadium

6 March 2027 25	Twente	v	AZ	Enschede
TBC		Report		Stadium: De Grolsch Veste

13 March 2027 26	Willem II	v	Twente	Tilburg
TBC		Report		Stadium: Koning Willem II Stadion

20 March 2027 27	Twente	v	GA Eagles	Enschede
TBC		Report		Stadium: De Grolsch Veste

3 April 2027 28	Ajax	v	Twente	Amsterdam
TBC		Report		Stadium: Johan Cruyff Arena

10 April 2027 29	Telstar	v	Twente	Velsen
TBC		Report		Stadium: BUKO Stadion

24 April 2027 30	Twente	v	NEC	Enschede
TBC		Report		Stadium: De Grolsch Veste

1 May 2027 31	Sparta	v	Twente	Rotterdam
TBC		Report		Stadium: Het Kasteel

8 May 2027 32	Twente	v	Groningen	Enschede
TBC		Report		Stadium: De Grolsch Veste

16 May 2027 33	Twente	v	Feyenoord	Enschede
13:30 UTC+2		Report		Stadium: De Grolsch Veste

23 May 2027 34	PEC Zwolle	v	Twente	Zwolle
13:30 UTC+2		Report		Stadium: MAC3PARK Stadion

=== UEFA Europa League ===
As the fourth-place team in Eredivisie, Twente entered the competition in the second qualifying round.

==== Second qualifying round ====
23 July 2026 1st leg	Twente (Netherlands)	1–2	(Hungary) Ferencváros	Enschede, Netherlands
20:00 CEST	Adelgaard 38'	Report	Joseph 14', 80'	Stadium: De Grolsch Veste; Attendance: 27,500; Referee: Damian Kos

30 July 2026 2nd leg	Ferencváros (Hungary)	2–2 (4–3 agg.)	(Netherlands) Twente	Budapest, Hungary
20:00 CEST	Raemaekers 24' (pen.); Rommens (red card) 34'; Joseph 50'	Report	Weghorst 83'; Vennegoor of Hesselink 86'	Stadium: Groupama Aréna; Attendance: 17,201; Referee: Viktor Kopiievskyi

=== UEFA Conference League ===
==== Qualifying rounds ====
6 August 2026 Third qualifying round 1st leg	Twente (Netherlands)	6–0	(Slovakia) DAC Dunajská Streda	Enschede, Netherlands
19:00 CEST	D.Rots 7'; Pjaca 11'; Weidmann 49'; Bruns 56'; Zerrouki 64'; Pröpper (yellow card) 52', (goal) 78'	Report	Diongue (yellow card) 55'	Stadium: De Grolsch Veste; Attendance: 24,135; Referee: Sam Barrott (England)

13 August 2026 Third qualifying round 2nd leg	DAC Dunajská Streda (Slovakia)	3–3 (3–9 agg.)	(Netherlands) Twente	Dunajská Streda, Slovakia
17:00 CEST	Gueye 56'; Nemanič 66'; Gagua (yellow card) 85'; Owusu 88'	Report	Bruns 7'; Pjaca 51', 90+4'	Stadium: DAC Aréna; Attendance: 3,225; Referee: Florian Badstübner (Germany)

20 August 2026 Play-off round 1st leg	Twente (Netherlands)	0–1	(Azerbaijan) Qarabağ	Enschede, Netherlands
20:00	Pröpper (yellow card) 23'; Adelgaard (yellow card) 28'; Weidmann (yellow card) 34'; Zerrouki (yellow card) 58'; D.Rots (yellow card) 66'	Report	Silva (yellow card) 28'; Kady 52'	Stadium: De Grolsch Veste; Referee: Juxhin Xhaja (Albania)

27 August 2026 Play-off round 2nd leg	Qarabağ (Azerbaijan)	1–4 (a.e.t.) (2–4 agg.)	(Netherlands) Twente	Baku, Azerbaijan
20:00 (UTC+4)	Langa (yellow card) 23'; Lobato (yellow card) 58'; Kady 59'; Várkonyi (yellow card) 90+4'; Mouaddib (yellow card) 92'; Janković (yellow card) 90' (yellow-red card) 106'	Report	Zerrouki (yellow card) 22'; Pjaca 79'; Bruns 90+2'; Weghorst 94' (yellow card) 106'; Taha 114' (yellow card) 116'	Stadium: Tofiq Bahramov Republican Stadium; Attendance: 28,869; Referee: Rohit Saggi (Norway)

==== League phase ====
In the league phase, Twente were drawn against Thun, Kairat and Pafos at home, and Freiburg, Lincoln Red Imps and AGF away.

Pos	Team	Pld	W	D	L	GF	GA	GD	Pts	Qualification
1	(Switzerland) Lugano	3	3	0	0	11	4	+7	9	Advance to round of 16 (seeded)
2	(Greece) Panathinaikos	3	3	0	0	9	3	+6	9	Advance to round of 16 (seeded)
3	(Netherlands) Twente	3	3	0	0	8	2	+6	9	Advance to round of 16 (seeded)
4	(France) Monaco	3	3	0	0	7	1	+6	9	Advance to round of 16 (seeded)
5	(England) Brighton & Hove Albion	3	2	1	0	5	0	+5	7	Advance to round of 16 (seeded)

Updated to match(es) played on 5 November 2026. Source: UEFA
Rules for classification: League phase tiebreakers

Round	1	2	3	4	5	6
Ground	H	A	H	A	A	H
Result	W	W	W			
Position	13	5	3			
Points	3	6	9			

Updated to match(es) played on 5 November 2026. Source: UEFA
A = Away; H = Home; W = Win; D = Draw; L = Loss

Win Draw Loss Fixtures

15 October 2026 1	Twente (Netherlands)	1–0	(Switzerland) FC Thun	Enschede, Netherlands
21:00 CEST	Adelgaard (yellow card) 43'; Zerrouki 65'	Report	Fehr (yellow card) 31'; Kristal (red card) 60'	Stadium: De Grolsch Veste; Attendance: 28,500; Referee: Genc Nuza (Kosovo)

22 October 2026 2	Lincoln Red Imps (Gibraltar)	1–4	(Netherlands) Twente	Europa Point, Gibraltar
21:00 CEST	Nano 38'	Report	van den Belt 19', 57'; Weghorst 24'; Nijstad (yellow card) 37'; Taha (yellow card) 43'; Weidmann 90+4'	Stadium: Europa Point Stadium; Attendance: 1,238; Referee: Matteo Marcenaro (Italy)

5 November 2026 3	Twente (Netherlands)	3–1	(Cyprus) Pafos	Enschede, Netherlands
21:00 CET	Nijstad (yellow card) 34', (goal) 62'; Ørjasæter 76'; Weidmann 82'	Report	Lelê 39', (yellow card) 40' (yellow-red card) 64'	Stadium: De Grolsch Veste; Attendance: 28,500; Referee: Michal Očenáš (Slovakia)

26 November 2026 4	SC Freiburg (Germany)	v	(Netherlands) Twente	Freiburg, Germany
21:00 CET				Stadium: Europa-Park Stadion

10 December 2026 5	AGF (Denmark)	v	(Netherlands) Twente	Aarhus, Denmark
21:00 CET				Stadium: Vejlby Stadium

17 December 2026 6	Twente (Netherlands)	v	(Kazakhstan) Kairat	Enschede, Netherlands
21:00 CET				Stadium: De Grolsch Veste

=== KNVB Cup ===
2 December 2026 Second round	Fortuna Sittard	v	Twente	Sittard
21:00				Stadium: Fortuna Sittard Stadion

== Statistics ==
=== Goalscorers ===
As of 8 November 2026

Rank	No	Pos	Nat	Name	Eredivisie	KNVB Cup	Europa League	Conference League	Total
1	9	FW	(Netherlands)	Wout Weghorst	9	0	1	2	12
2	7	FW	(Croatia)	Marko Pjaca	2	0	0	4	6
2	8	MF	(France)	Daouda Weidmann	3	0	0	3	6
3	11	FW	(Netherlands)	Daan Rots	3	0	0	1	4
4	6	MF	(Algeria)	Ramiz Zerrouki	1	0	0	2	3
4	20	MF	(Netherlands)	Thomas van den Belt	1	0	0	2	3
4	38	DF	(Netherlands)	Max Bruns	0	0	0	3	3
4	10	FW	(Morocco)	Younes Taha	2	0	0	1	3
4	3	DF	(Netherlands)	Robin Pröpper	2	0	0	1	3
4	27	FW	(Norway)	Sondre Ørjasæter	2	0	0	1	3
5	25	FW	(Netherlands)	Lucas Vennegoor of Hesselink	1	0	1	0	2
5	4	DF	(Netherlands)	Ruud Nijstad	1	0	0	1	2
6	18	MF	(Belgium)	Jordy Bawuah	1	0	0	0	1
6	29	DF	(Denmark)	Aske Adelgaard	0	0	1	0	1
Own goals					2	0	0	0	2
Totals					30	0	3	21	54

=== Clean sheets ===
As of 1 November 2026

Rank	No	Pos	Nat	Name	Eredivisie	KNVB Cup	Europa League	Conference League	Total
1	1	GK	(Germany)	Lars Unnerstall	2	0	0	1	3
1	16	GK	(Netherlands)	Joël Drommel	2	0	0	1	3
