= 2025–26 FC Twente season =

FC Twente
2025–26 season
- Chairman: Dominique Scholten
- Head coach: John van den Brom
- Stadium: De Grolsch Veste
- Eredivisie: 4th
- KNVB Cup: Quarter-finals
- Top goalscorer: League: Kristian Hlynsson (10); All: Kristian Hlynsson (12)
- Highest home attendance: 30,000 (vs Ajax, 26 October 2025)
- Lowest home attendance: 25,700 (vs PEC, 10 January 2026)
- Average home league attendance: 29,385
- Biggest win: 5–0 (vs Heerenveen (H), 7 February 2026, Eredivisie)
- Biggest defeat: 1–5 (vs PSV (A), 17 May 2026, Eredivisie)

The 2025–26 season was the 61st season in the history of FC Twente, and the club's seventh consecutive season in the Eredivisie. In addition to the domestic league, the club competed in the KNVB Cup.

== Season events ==
On September 4, 2025, FC Twente announced that coach Joseph Oosting had been dismissed with immediate effect due to disappointing results and the team's style of play. The club stated that a successor would be appointed soon.

Eleven days later, on 15 September 2025, FC Twente confirmed the appointment of John van den Brom as the new head coach. He signed a contract running until the end of the season. On 27 March 2026, FC Twente extended van den Brom's contract until mid-2027.

On 6 January 2026, FC Twente officially announced the appointment of former player and manager Erik ten Hag as the club's new Technical Director. Ten Hag formally joined the club on 1 February 2026, signing a contract until mid-2028. He will work alongside current technical director Jan Streuer before officially succeeding him at the start of the 2026–27 season. Upon his appointment, Ten Hag expressed his desire to strengthen the club's technical foundation, citing his long-standing emotional connection to Twente as a primary motivation for his return.

== Players ==
=== Squad ===
As of 16 March 2026

Note: Flags indicate national team as defined under FIFA eligibility rules; some limited exceptions apply. Players may hold more than one non-FIFA nationality.

No.	Pos.	Nation	Player
1	GK	GER	Lars Unnerstall
2	DF	IDN	Mees Hilgers (injured)
3	DF	NED	Robin Pröpper (captain)
4	MF	NOR	Mathias Kjølø
6	MF	ALG	Ramiz Zerrouki (on loan from Feyenoord)
7	FW	CRO	Marko Pjaca
8	MF	USA	Taylor Booth
9	FW	NED	Ricky van Wolfswinkel (vice-captain)
10	FW	NED	Sam Lammers
11	FW	NED	Daan Rots
12	DF	POR	Guilherme Peixoto
14	MF	ISL	Kristian Hlynsson
20	MF	NED	Thomas van den Belt
21	GK	NED	Sam Karssies

No.	Pos.	Nation	Player
22	GK	POL	Przemysław Tytoń
23	DF	ISR	Stav Lemkin
25	FW	NED	Lucas Vennegoor of Hesselink
27	FW	NOR	Sondre Ørjasæter
28	DF	NED	Bart van Rooij
31	GK	NED	Yannick Gerritsen
32	MF	BEL	Arno Verschueren
36	FW	NED	Nigel Groenewald
37	FW	TUR	Naci Ünüvar
38	DF	NED	Max Bruns
39	DF	NED	Mats Rots
42	MF	FRA	Daouda Weidmann
43	DF	NED	Ruud Nijstad

== Transfers ==
=== In ===
Date	Pos.	Player	Transferred from	Fee	Ref.
16 June 2025	MF	(Netherlands) Thomas van den Belt	(Netherlands) Feyenoord	Undisclosed	
27 June 2025	DF	(Israel) Stav Lemkin	(Ukraine) Shakhtar Donetsk	Undisclosed	
3 July 2025	DF	(Portugal) Guilherme Peixoto	(Portugal) Benfica	Undisclosed	
8 July 2025	MF	(Iceland) Kristian Hlynsson	(Netherlands) Ajax	Undisclosed	
26 July 2025	DF	(Netherlands) Robin Pröpper	(Scotland) Rangers	Undisclosed	
13 August 2025	FW	(Norway) Sondre Ørjasæter	(Norway) Sarpsborg 08 FF	Undisclosed	
1 September 2025	MF	(France) Daouda Weidmann	(Netherlands) RKC Waalwijk	Undisclosed	
2 September 2025	FW	(Croatia) Marko Pjaca	(Croatia) Dinamo Zagreb	Free transfer	

=== Out ===
Date	Pos.	Player	Transferred to	Fee	Ref.
1 May 2025	MF	(Netherlands) Sem Steijn	(Netherlands) Feyenoord	Undisclosed	
2 June 2025	MF	(Czech Republic) Michal Sadílek	(Czech Republic) Slavia Prague	Undisclosed	
4 August 2025	MF	(Netherlands) Carel Eiting	(Cyprus) Omonia Nicosia	Undisclosed	
10 August 2025	MF	(Netherlands) Michel Vlap	(Qatar) Al Ahli	Undisclosed	
18 August 2025	FW	(Netherlands) Mitchell van Bergen	(Netherlands) Sparta Rotterdam	Undisclosed	

=== Loans in ===
Start date	Pos.	Player	From	End date	Fee	Ref.
30 July 2025	MF	(Algeria) Ramiz Zerrouki	(Netherlands) Feyenoord	30 June 2026	Undisclosed	

=== Loans out ===
Date	Pos.	Player	To	End date	Fee	Ref.
30 June 2025	MF	(Netherlands) Harrie Kuster	(Netherlands) RKC Waalwijk	30 June 2026	Undisclosed	
6 July 2025	FW	(Morocco) Younes Taha	(Netherlands) FC Groningen	30 June 2026	Undisclosed	
8 July 2025	DF	(Netherlands) Juliën Mesbahi	(Netherlands) FC Emmen	30 June 2026	Undisclosed	
7 August 2025	FW	(Tunisia) Sayfallah Ltaief	(Netherlands) Sparta Rotterdam	30 June 2026	Undisclosed	
13 August 2025	MF	(Netherlands) Gijs Besselink	(Netherlands) Willem II	30 June 2026	Undisclosed	
1 September 2025	FW	(Netherlands) Owen Panneflek	(Netherlands) RKC Waalwijk	30 June 2026	Undisclosed	
2 September 2025	DF	(Belgium) Alec Van Hoorenbeeck	(Netherlands) Heracles Almelo	30 June 2026	Undisclosed	
31 December 2025	DF	(Netherlands) Bas Kuipers	(Portugal) F.C. Arouca	30 June 2026	Undisclosed	
27 January 2026	FW	(Turkey) Naci Ünüvar	(Netherlands) Heracles Almelo	30 June 2026	Undisclosed	

== Pre-season and friendlies ==
Win Draw Loss

1 July 2025 Friendly	Twente (Netherlands)	3–0	(Scotland) Motherwell	Beckum, Netherlands
18:00	van Wolfswinkel 13'; Ünüvar 69', 86'	Report		Attendance: 1,500; Referee: Alex Bos

5 July 2025 Friendly	Twente (Netherlands)	3–0	(Belgium) Lokeren	Deurningen, Netherlands
15:00	Verschueren 14'; Ünüvar 28' (pen.); van Wolfswinkel 96'	Report		Stadium: Sportpark Het Hoge Vonder; Referee: Bas Nijhuis
Note: This match was played over 4x30 minutes.

11 July 2025 Friendly	Twente (Netherlands)	2–3	(Azerbaijan) Qarabağ	Salzburg, Austria
14:00	Booth 22', 31'	Report	Zoubir 36', 53'; Andrade 41'	Stadium: Alois Latini Stadion; Referee: Florian Hunter

11 July 2025 Friendly	Twente (Netherlands)	2–1	(Azerbaijan) Qarabağ	Salzburg, Austria
16:15	Ünüvar 16' (pen.), 31'	Report	66'	Stadium: Alois Latini Stadion; Referee: Manuel Baumann

16 July 2025 Friendly	Twente (Netherlands)	2–1	(South Africa) Kaizer Chiefs	Delden, Netherlands
19:00	D. Rots 42'; Ltaief 85'	Report	Miguel 68'	Attendance: Bas Nijhuis; Referee: 1,600

19 July 2025 Friendly	RW Oberhausen (Germany)	2–2	(Netherlands) Twente	Oberhausen, Germany
17:00				Stadium: Niederrheinstadion

19 July 2025 Friendly	Schalke 04 (Germany)	0–0	(Netherlands) Twente	Gelsenkirchen, Germany
14:00		Report		Stadium: Parkstadion; Attendance: 5,000; Referee: Robert Kampka

27 July 2025 Friendly	Porto (Portugal)	2–1	(Netherlands) Twente	Porto, Portugal
19:00	Veiga (red card) 43'; Samu 65'; Gomes (pen.) 90'	Report	Ünüvar (red card) 43'; van Bergen 52'	Stadium: Estadio do Dragao

30 July 2025 Friendly	Twente (Netherlands)	1–0	(Netherlands) RKC Waalwijk	Fleringen, Netherlands
19:00	M. Rots 44'	Report

2 August 2025 Friendly	Twente (Netherlands)	0–1	(Italy) Udinese	Enschede, Netherlands
19:00		Report	Bravo 44'	Stadium: De Grolsch Veste

13 November 2025 Friendly	Twente (Netherlands)	1–0	(Germany) Schalke 04	Enschede, Netherlands
19:00	D. Rots 53'	Report		Stadium: De Grolsch Veste; Attendance: 25,000

16 April 2026 Friendly	Ajax (Netherlands)	0–1	(Netherlands) Twente	Duivendrecht, Netherlands
14:00	Weidmann 82'	Report		Stadium: Sportpark De Toekomst

== Competitions ==
=== Overall record ===
Competition	First match	Last match	Starting round	Final position	Record							
Competition	First match	Last match	Starting round	Final position	Pld	W	D	L	GF	GA	GD	Win %
Eredivisie	10 August 2025	17 May 2026	Matchday 1	4th	34	15	13	6	59	40	+19	44.12
KNVB Cup	30 October 2025	3 February 2026	First round	Quarter-finals	4	3	0	1	13	7	+6	75.00
Total					38	18	13	7	72	47	+25	47.37

Source: FC Twente

==== Results summary ====
Overall								Home						Away					
Pld	W	D	L	GF	GA	GD	Pts	W	D	L	GF	GA	GD	W	D	L	GF	GA	GD
34	15	13	6	59	40	+19	58	9	5	3	29	16	+13	6	8	3	30	24	+6

Source: Soccerway

=== Eredivisie ===
==== League table ====
Pos	Team	Pld	W	D	L	GF	GA	GD	Pts	Qualification or relegation
2	Feyenoord	34	19	8	7	70	44	+26	65	Qualification for the Champions League league phase
3	NEC	34	16	11	7	77	53	+24	59	Qualification for the Champions League third qualifying round
4	Twente	34	15	13	6	59	40	+19	58	Qualification for the Europa League second qualifying round
5	Ajax (O)	34	14	14	6	62	41	+21	56	Qualification for the European competition play-offs
6	Utrecht	34	15	8	11	55	42	+13	53	Qualification for the European competition play-offs

Source: Eredivisie
Rules for classification: At end of season: 1) Points; 2) Goal difference; 3) Goals scored; 4) Head-to-head points; 5) Head-to-head goal difference; 6) Head-to-head goals scored; 7) Head-to-head away goals scored; 8) Play-off match or matches; 9) Penalty shoot-out (if the play-off match or matches end in a draw)
(O) Play-off winners

==== Results by round ====
Round	1	2	3	4	5	6	7	8	9	10	11	12	13	14	15	16	17	18	19	20	21	22	23	24	25	26	27	28	29	30	31	32	33	34
Ground	A	H	A	A	H	A	H	H	A	H	A	H	A	H	A	H	A	H	A	H	A	H	A	H	H	A	H	A	A	H	H	A	H	A
Result	L	L	W	L	D	W	W	W	D	L	D	D	D	W	D	W	D	D	W	D	D	W	D	W	W	W	L	W	W	W	D	D	W	L
Position	12	15	10	14	13	11	8	7	8	8	9	8	8	7	8	7	6	7	6	8	7	6	7	6	5	4	5	5	4	4	5	5	3	4

Updated to match(es) played on 17 May 2026. Source: Eredivisie
A = Away; H = Home; W = Win; D = Draw; L = Loss

==== Matches ====
The league fixtures were unveiled on 24 June 2025.

==== 1st half ====
10 August 2025 1	PEC Zwolle	1–0	Twente	Zwolle
12:15 UTC+2	Oosting 8'; Floranus (yellow card) 76'; Aertssen (yellow card) 89'; Buitink (yellow card) 89'; van der Haar (yellow card) 90+4'	Report	van Rooij (yellow card) 45+2'	Stadium: MAC³PARK Stadion; Attendance: 13,789; Referee: Joey Kooij

17 August 2025 2	Twente	0–2	PSV	Enschede
14:30 UTC+2	Pröpper (yellow card) 28'	Report	Bruns 7' (o.g.); Schouten (yellow card) 27' (goal) 54'; Flamingo (yellow card) 60'	Stadium: De Grolsch Veste; Attendance: 30,000; Referee: Sander van der Eijk

24 August 2025 3	Heerenveen	1–2	Twente	Heerenveen
14:30 UTC+2	Sejk 90+4'; Brouwers (yellow card) 80' (yellow card) 90+7' (yellow-red card)	Report	Rots 12'; Ünüvar 84' (yellow card) 90+3'; Rots (yellow card) 9'; Booth (yellow card) 68'; van Wolfswinkel (yellow card) 80'	Stadium: Abe Lenstra Stadion; Attendance: 13,764; Referee: Dennis Higler

30 August 2025 4	Excelsior	1–0	Twente	Rotterdam
21:30 UTC+2	Henderikx (red card); van Duinen (yellow card) 72' (goal) 83'; Bergraaf (yellow card) 88'	Report	van Rooij (yellow card) 27'; Pröpper (yellow card) 80'	Stadium: Van Donge & De Roo Stadion; Attendance: 3,608; Referee: Ingmar Oostrom

13 September 2025 5	Twente	2–2	NAC	Enschede
21:00 UTC+2	Verschueren (yellow card) 46'; Pjaca 64'; van Wolfswinkel (yellow card) 21' (goal) 87' (pen.)	Report	Nassoh 3'; Kemper (yellow card) 22'; Paula 90+1'	Stadium: De Grolsch Veste; Attendance: 29,500; Referee: Alex Bos

19 September 2025 6	Sparta Rotterdam	1–5	Twente	Rotterdam
20:00 UTC+2	Lauritsen 24'	Report	Zerrouki 13'; Weidmann (yellow card) 25'; Hlynsson 51'; van Rooij 60'; van Wolfswinkel 65'; Ünüvar 85'	Stadium: Sparta Stadion Het Kasteel; Attendance: 11,026; Referee: Martin van den Kerkhof

26 September 2025 7	Twente	3–2	Fortuna Sittard	Enschede
20:00 UTC+2	van Wolfswinkel 38' (pen.); van Rooij 57'; Ünüvar (yellow card) 76'; van den Belt 78'	Report	Dahlhaus (yellow card) 20'; Lonwijk 72'; Gladon (yellow card) 78'; Tunjic 90'	Stadium: De Grolsch Veste; Attendance: 29,500; Referee: Danny Makkelie

5 October 2025 8	Twente	2–1	Heracles	Enschede
12:15 UTC+2	Bruns 48'; van den Belt 84'	Report	Mesik 43'	Stadium: De Grolsch Veste; Attendance: 30,000; Referee: Allard Lindhout

19 October 2025 9	NEC	3–3	Twente	Nijmegen
16:45 UTC+2	Ouwejan 29'; El Kachati 66'; Verschueren 83' (o.g.)	Report	van Wolfswinkel 24' (pen.), 92' (pen.); Rots 55'	Stadium: Goffertstadion; Attendance: 12,650; Referee: Marc Nagtegaal

26 October 2025 10	Twente	2–3	Ajax	Enschede
12:15 UTC+2	Hlynsson 4'; van Wolfswinkel 64' (pen.)	Report	Weghorst 49'; Oscar Gloukh 51'; Godts 56'	Stadium: De Grolsch Veste; Attendance: 30,000; Referee: Serdar Gözübüyük

2 November 2025 11	Groningen	1–1	Twente	Groningen
14:30 UTC+2	Resink 53' (pen.)	Report	Hlynsson 47'	Stadium: Euroborg; Attendance: 22,550; Referee: Joey Kooij

7 November 2025 12	Twente	0–0	Telstar	Enschede
20:00 UTC+2	Pröpper (yellow card) 33'; Pjaca (yellow card) 53'; Hlynsson (red card) 90+7'	Report	Koswal (yellow card) 83'; Tejan (yellow card) 89'; Hamdaoui (red card)	Stadium: De Grolsch Veste; Attendance: 29,500; Referee: Martijn Vos

22 November 2025 13	Volendam	1–1	Twente	Volendam
18:45 UTC+2	Mühren 86'	Report	Rots 46'; van den Belt (yellow card) 52'; Ørjasæter (yellow card) 68'; van Rooij (yellow card) 78'	Stadium: Kras Stadion; Attendance: 6,896; Referee: Stan Teuben

30 November 2025 14	Twente	1–0	AZ	Enschede
16:45 UTC+2	Rots 75'; Peixoto (yellow card) 85'; Pröpper (yellow card) 90+9'	Report		Stadium: De Grolsch Veste; Attendance: 29,700; Referee: Jeroen Manschot

7 December 2025 15	Utrecht	1–1	Twente	Utrecht
12:15 UTC+2	Jensen 52'; Viergever (yellow card) 90+3'	Report	Rots (yellow card) 24'; M. Rots 82'; Ørjasæter (yellow card) 90+5'	Stadium: Stadion Galgenwaard; Attendance: 23,045; Referee: Allard Lindhout

14 December 2025 16	Twente	2–0	Go Ahead Eagles	Enschede
14:30 UTC+2	Lammers 20' (pen.), 45+2'	Report	Rahmouni (yellow card) 17'; Adelgaard (yellow card) 73'; Smit (yellow card) 74'	Stadium: De Grolsch Veste; Attendance: 30,000; Referee: Joey Kooij

20 December 2025 17	Feyenoord	1–1	Twente	Rotterdam
14:30 UTC+2	Borges 74'	Report	D. Rots 19'	Stadium: De Kuip; Attendance: 47,500; Referee: Dennis Higler

==== 2st half ====
10 January 2026 18	Twente	1–1	PEC	Enschede
18:45 UTC+2	van Rooij (yellow card) 81'; Rots 86'	Report	Shoretire (yellow card) 53', (goal) 66'; de Rooij (yellow card) 61'; Thomas (yellow card) 87'	Stadium: De Grolsch Veste; Attendance: 25,700; Referee: Robin Hensgens

18 January 2026 19	Heracles	0–2	Twente	Almelo
14:30 UTC+2		Report	van den Belt 30'; van Wolfswinkel 55' (pen.)	Stadium: Asito Stadion; Attendance: 12,274; Referee: Sander van der Eijk

24 January 2026 20	Twente	0–0	Excelsior	Enschede
21:00 UTC+2		Report		Stadium: De Grolsch Veste; Attendance: 29,000; Referee: Allard Lindhout

30 January 2026 21	NAC	2–2	Twente	Breda
20:00 UTC+2	Holtby (yellow card) 9'; Brym 61'; Soumano 88'	Report	D. Rots (yellow card) 9'; M. Rots 41'; van Wolfswinkel 51'	Stadium: Rat Verlegh Stadion; Attendance: 20,095; Referee: Joey Kooij

7 February 2026 22	Twente	5–0	Heerenveen	Enschede
19:00 UTC+2	Zerrouki 19'; M. Rots 30'; D. Rots (yellow card) 44'; D. Rots 54'; Hlynsson 63'; Lammers 84'	Report	Willemsen (yellow card) 52'; Braude (yellow card) 75'; Rivera (yellow card) 86'	Stadium: De Grolsch Veste; Attendance: 29,500; Referee: Jeroen Manschot

15 February 2026 23	Telstar	1–1	Twente	Velsen-Zuid
13:30 UTC+2	Van Duijn 17'; Ritmeester van de Kamp (yellow card) 90'	Report	van den Belt (yellow card) 25'; Pjaca 83'	Stadium: BUKO Stadion; Attendance: 5,302; Referee: Stan Teuben

21 February 2026 24	Twente	2–1	Groningen	Enschede
11:15 UTC+2	D. Rots 39'; Hlynsson 48'	Report	van der Werff (yellow card) 25'; Mecera (yellow card) 78'	Stadium: De Grolsch Veste; Attendance: 29,000; Referee: Danny Makkelie

28 February 2026 25	Twente	2–0	Feyenoord	Enschede
13:30 UTC+2	Hlynsson 45'; Ørjasæter 72'	Report		Stadium: De Grolsch Veste; Attendance: 30,000; Referee: Joey Kooij

8 March 2026 26	Go Ahead Eagles	1–4	Twente	Deventer
13:30 UTC+2	Breum 56'; James (yellow card) 73'	Report	De Busser 19' (o.g.); Lammers 26' 74' (pen.); Hlynsson 50'	Stadium: De Adelaarshorst; Referee: Alex Bos

15 March 2026 27	Twente	0–2	Utrecht	Enschede
11:15 UTC+2	van den Belt (yellow card) 25'	Report	de Wit (yellow card) 18'; Stepanov 32'; Zechiel (yellow card) 57'; Alarcon 66'; Barkas (yellow card) 89'	Stadium: De Grolsch Veste; Referee: Marc Nagtegaal

21 March 2026 28	Fortuna Sittard	1–2	Twente	Sittard
15:30 UTC+2	Limnios 5'; Dalhaus (yellow card) 22'; Brittijn (yellow card) 57'	Report	D.Rots 55'; Hlynsson 60'	Stadium: Fortuna Sittard Stadion; Attendance: 12,052; Referee: Ingmar Oostrom

4 April 2026 29	Ajax	1–2	Twente	Amsterdam
20:00 UTC+2	Weghorst 32'; Edvardsen (yellow card) 41'; Gaaei (yellow card) 55'; Gloukh (yellow card) 63'; Berghuis (yellow card) 69'	Report	Zerrouki 18'; D.Rots (yellow card) 61'; Lemkin (yellow card) 64'; van Rooij 79'	Stadium: Johan Cruyff Arena; Attendance: 53,364; Referee: Sander van der Eijk

10 April 2026 30	Twente	2–1	FC Volendam	Enschede
19:00 UTC+2	Nijstad 2'; Hlynsson 34'; Booth (yellow card) 85'	Report	Yah (yellow card) 23'; Bukala 74'	Stadium: De Grolsch Veste; Attendance: 29,700; Referee: Robin Hensgens

25 April 2026 31	Twente	1–1	NEC	Enschede
20:00 UTC+2	Ørjasæter 10'; M. Rots (yellow card) 79'	Report	Lebreton (yellow card) 18'; Fonville (yellow card) 26'; Linssen 37'	Stadium: De Grolsch Veste; Attendance: 30,000; Referee: Joey Kooij

3 May 2026 32	AZ	2–2	Twente	Alkmaar
15:45 UTC+2	Clasie 13'; Koopmeiners 90+5'	Report	Owusu-Oduro 32' (o.g.); Lammers 55'	Stadium: AFAS Stadion; Attendance: 19,500; Referee: Sander van der Eijk

10 May 2026 33	Twente	4–0	Sparta	Enschede
15:45 UTC+2	van den Belt 58' 59'; Hlynsson 71'; D.Rots 78'	Report	Young (yellow card) 17'; Martins Indi (yellow card) 70'	Stadium: De Grolsch Veste; Attendance: 29,600; Referee: Jannick van der Laan

17 May 2026 34	PSV	5–1	Twente	Eindhoven
13:30 UTC+2	Flamingo 15'; Dest (yellow card) 33'; Fernandez 44'; Man 53'; Til 56'; Pepi 84' (pen.)	Report	Ørjasæter 16'; Lemkin (yellow card) 65'	Stadium: Philips Stadion; Attendance: 35,400; Referee: Jeroen Manschot

=== KNVB Cup ===
FC Twente participated in the 2025–26 KNVB Cup and reached the quarter-finals after away victories against Rohda Raalte, SV Spakenburg and FC Utrecht. Twente were eliminated by AZ in the quarter-finals after extra time.

30 October 2025 First round	Rohda Raalte	1–4	Twente	Raalte
21:00 (UTC+2)		Report	Lammers 41'; Verschueren 50'; Ørjasæter 58'; Kuipers 78'	Stadium: Sportpark Tijenraan; Attendance: 4,500; Referee: Rob Dieperink

18 December 2025 Second round	Spakenburg	3–6	Twente	Spakenburg
18:45 (UTC+1)		Report	Rots 40'; Ørjasæter 54'; Van den Belt 59'; Hlynsson 73'; Weidmann 75'; Van Wolfswinkel 86'	Stadium: Sportpark De Westmaat; Attendance: 7,000; Referee: Jannick van der Laan

13 January 2026 Last 16	Utrecht	1–2	Twente	Utrecht
21:00 (UTC+1)	De Wit 12'	Report	Van Wolfswinkel 68'; Rots 82'	Stadium: Stadion Galgenwaard; Attendance: 23,750; Referee: Serdar Gözübüyük

3 February 2026 Quarter-finals	AZ	2–1 (a.e.t.)	Twente	Alkmaar
19:00 (UTC+1)	Šín 9'; Parrott 97'	Report	Hlynsson 65'	Stadium: AFAS Stadion; Attendance: 12,607; Referee: Martin van den Kerkhof

== Statistics ==
=== Appearances and goals ===
As of 17 May 2026

No.	Pos	Nat	Player	Total		Eredivisie		KNVB Cup	
No.	Pos	Nat	Player	Apps	Goals	Apps	Goals	Apps	Goals
Goalkeepers
1	GK	(Germany) GER	Lars Unnerstall	35	0	31	0	4	0
21	GK	(Netherlands) NED	Sam Karssies	0	0	0	0	0	0
22	GK	(Poland) POL	Przemysław Tytoń	3	0	3	0	0	0
31	GK	(Netherlands) NED	Yannick Gerritsen	0	0	0	0	0	0
Defenders
2	DF	(Indonesia) IDN	Mees Hilgers (injured)	0	0	0	0	0	0
3	DF	(Netherlands) NED	Robin Pröpper	31	0	28	0	3	0
12	DF	(Portugal) POR	Guilherme Peixoto	2	0	1	0	1	0
23	DF	(Israel) ISR	Stav Lemkin	29	0	25	0	4	0
28	DF	(Netherlands) NED	Bart van Rooij	37	3	33	3	4	0
38	DF	(Netherlands) NED	Max Bruns	14	1	13	1	1	0
39	DF	(Netherlands) NED	Mats Rots	37	5	34	4	3	1
43	DF	(Netherlands) NED	Ruud Nijstad	24	1	21	1	3	0
Midfielders
4	MF	(Norway) NOR	Mathias Kjølø	21	0	19	0	2	0
6	MF	(Algeria) ALG	Ramiz Zerrouki	35	3	32	3	3	0
8	MF	(United States) USA	Taylor Booth	11	0	10	0	1	0
14	MF	(Iceland) ISL	Kristian Hlynsson	37	12	33	10	4	2
20	MF	(Netherlands) NED	Thomas van den Belt	36	6	32	5	4	1
32	MF	(Belgium) BEL	Arno Verschueren	34	1	30	0	4	1
42	MF	(France) FRA	Daouda Weidmann	19	1	16	0	3	1
Forwards
7	FW	(Croatia) CRO	Marko Pjaca	29	2	27	2	2	0
9	FW	(Netherlands) NED	Ricky van Wolfswinkel	33	10	31	8	2	2
10	FW	(Netherlands) NED	Sam Lammers	29	7	25	6	4	1
11	FW	(Netherlands) NED	Daan Rots	37	10	33	9	4	1
25	FW	(Netherlands) NED	Lucas Vennegoor of Hesselink	6	0	5	0	1	0
27	FW	(Norway) NOR	Sondre Ørjasæter	34	5	30	3	4	2
36	DF	(Netherlands) NED	Nigel Groenewald	1	0	1	0	0	0
Players sold or loaned out after the start of the season:
5	DF	(Netherlands) NED	Bas Kuipers	10	1	8	0	2	1
7	FW	(Netherlands) NED	Mitchell van Bergen	1	0	1	0	0	0
16	GK	(Morocco) MAR	Issam El Maach	0	0	0	0	0	0
37	FW	(Turkey) TUR	Naci Ünüvar	11	2	10	2	1	0

Source: Soccerway

=== Scorers ===
As of 17 May 2026

Rank	No	Pos	Nat	Name	Eredivisie	KNVB Cup	Total
1	14	MF	(Iceland)	Kristian Hlynsson	10	2	12
2	9	FW	(Netherlands)	Ricky van Wolfswinkel	8	2	10
2	11	FW	(Netherlands)	Daan Rots	9	1	10
3	10	FW	(Netherlands)	Sam Lammers	6	1	7
4	20	MF	(Netherlands)	Thomas van den Belt	5	1	6
5	39	DF	(Netherlands)	Mats Rots	4	1	5
5	24	FW	(Norway)	Sondre Ørjasæter	3	2	5
7	28	DF	(Netherlands)	Bart van Rooij	3	0	3
7	6	MF	(Algeria)	Ramiz Zerrouki	3	0	3
8	37	FW	(Turkey)	Naci Ünüvar	2	0	2
8	7	FW	(Croatia)	Marko Pjaca	2	0	2
9	38	DF	(Netherlands)	Max Bruns	1	0	1
9	32	MF	(Belgium)	Arno Verschueren	0	1	1
9	5	DF	(Netherlands)	Bas Kuipers	0	1	1
9	42	MF	(France)	Daouda Weidmann	0	1	1
9	43	DF	(Netherlands)	Ruud Nijstad	1	0	1
Totals					44	13	57

Sources: ESPN (Eredivisie); FC Twente Statistieken (KNVB Cup match details)

=== Assists ===
As of 17 May 2026

Rank	No	Pos	Nat	Name	Eredivisie	KNVB Cup	Total
1	27	FW	(Norway)	Sondre Ørjasæter	6	2	8
2	10	FW	(Netherlands)	Sam Lammers	7	0	7
3	28	DF	(Netherlands)	Bart van Rooij	5	1	6
4	11	FW	(Netherlands)	Daan Rots	4	0	4
4	14	MF	(Iceland)	Kristian Hlynsson	4	0	4
4	39	DF	(Netherlands)	Mats Rots	4	0	4
5	20	MF	(Netherlands)	Thomas van den Belt	1	2	3
5	6	MF	(Algeria)	Ramiz Zerrouki	1	2	3
6	32	MF	(Belgium)	Arno Verschueren	2	0	2
6	7	FW	(Croatia)	Marko Pjaca	1	1	2
7	37	FW	(Turkey)	Naci Ünüvar	0	1	1
7	23	DF	(Israel)	Stav Lemkin	1	0	1
7	43	DF	(Netherlands)	Ruud Nijstad	1	0	1
7	9	FW	(Netherlands)	Ricky van Wolfswinkel	0	1	1
7	42	MF	(France)	Daouda Weidmann	1	0	1
Totals					27	10	37

Sources: ESPN (Eredivisie); FC Twente Statistieken (KNVB Cup match details)
