= Ruud Nijstad =

Dutch footballer (born 2008)

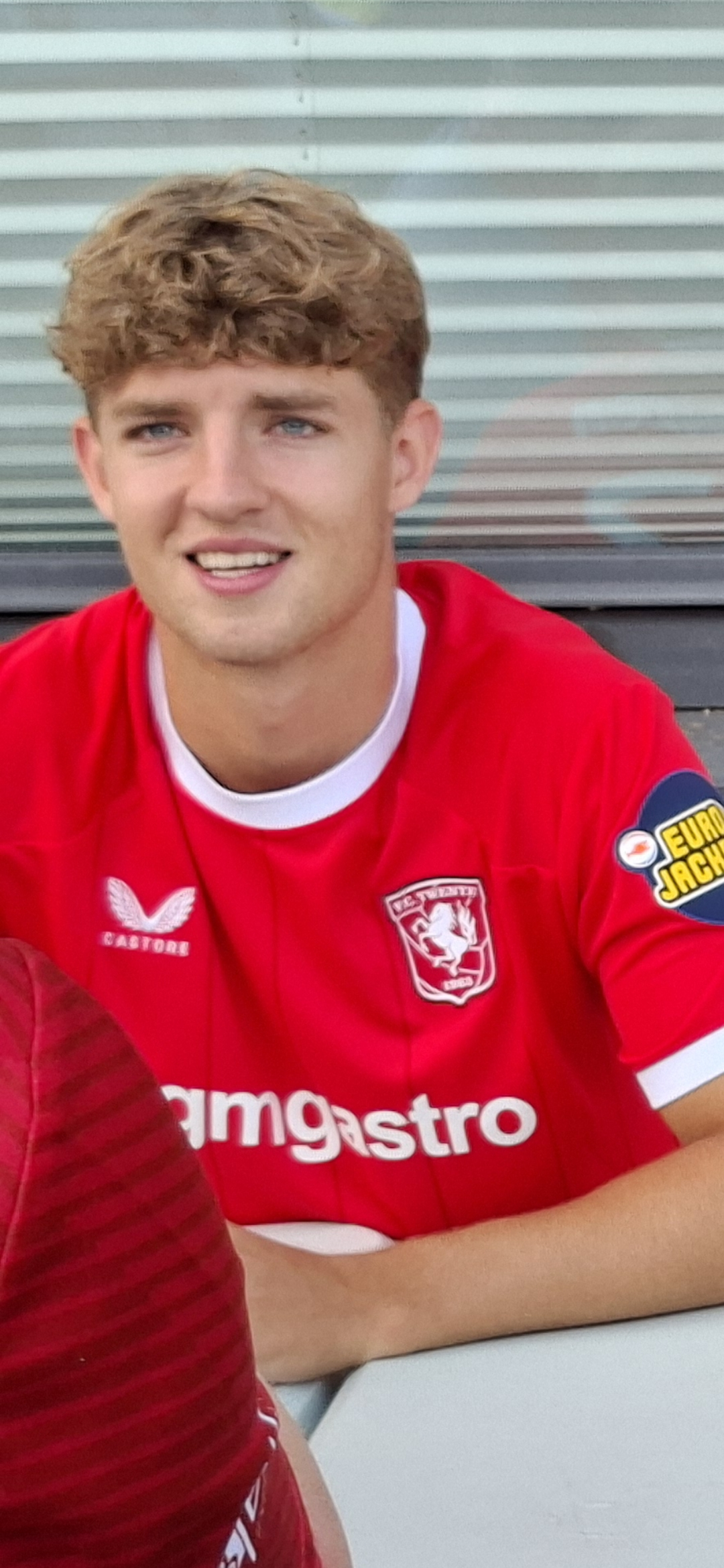
- Nijstad in 2026 with FC Twente

Personal information
- Date of birth: 17 January 2008 (age 18)
- Place of birth: Almelo, Netherlands
- Position: Defender

Team information
- Current team: FC Twente
- Number: 4

Youth career
- DETO
- FC Twente

Senior career*
Years	Team	Apps	(Gls)
2025–	FC Twente	30	(2)

International career^{‡}
2023-2024	Netherlands U16	9	(0)
2024–2025	Netherlands U17	9	(0)
2025–	Netherlands U18	6	(1)
2026–	Netherlands U19	2	(0)
- * Club domestic league appearances and goals as of 22:00, 25 October 2026 (UTC) ‡ National team caps and goals as of 19:33, 28 March 2026 (UTC)

Ruud Nijstad (born 17 January 2008) is a Dutch professional footballer who plays as a central defender for Eredivisie club FC Twente.

== Club career ==
Born in Almelo, Nijstad played as a youngster for amateur club DETO and later trained in the joint youth academy of FC Twente and Heracles Almelo. He signed a three-year professional contract with FC Twente in February 2024.

He made his professional debut for FC Twente in the Eredivisie on 5 October 2025, at the age of 17, appearing as a substitute in the eighth minute for Robin Pröpper against Heracles, in a 2–1 victory for his side.

== International career ==
Nijstad is a youth international for the Netherlands, having made his debut for the Netherlands U16 in October 2023.

== Career statistics ==
As of match played 25 October 2026

Appearances and goals by club, season and competition
Club	Season	League			Cup		Europe		Other		Total	
Club	Season	Division	Apps	Goals	Apps	Goals	Apps	Goals	Apps	Goals	Apps	Goals
Twente	2025–26	Eredivisie	21	1	3	0	—		—		24	1
Twente	2026–27	Eredivisie	9	1	0	0	7 (Note: Two appearances in UEFA Europa League, five appearances in UEFA Conference League)	0	—		16	1
Career total			30	2	3	0	7	0	0	0	40	2
