= Mathias Kjølø =

Norwegian footballer (born 2001)

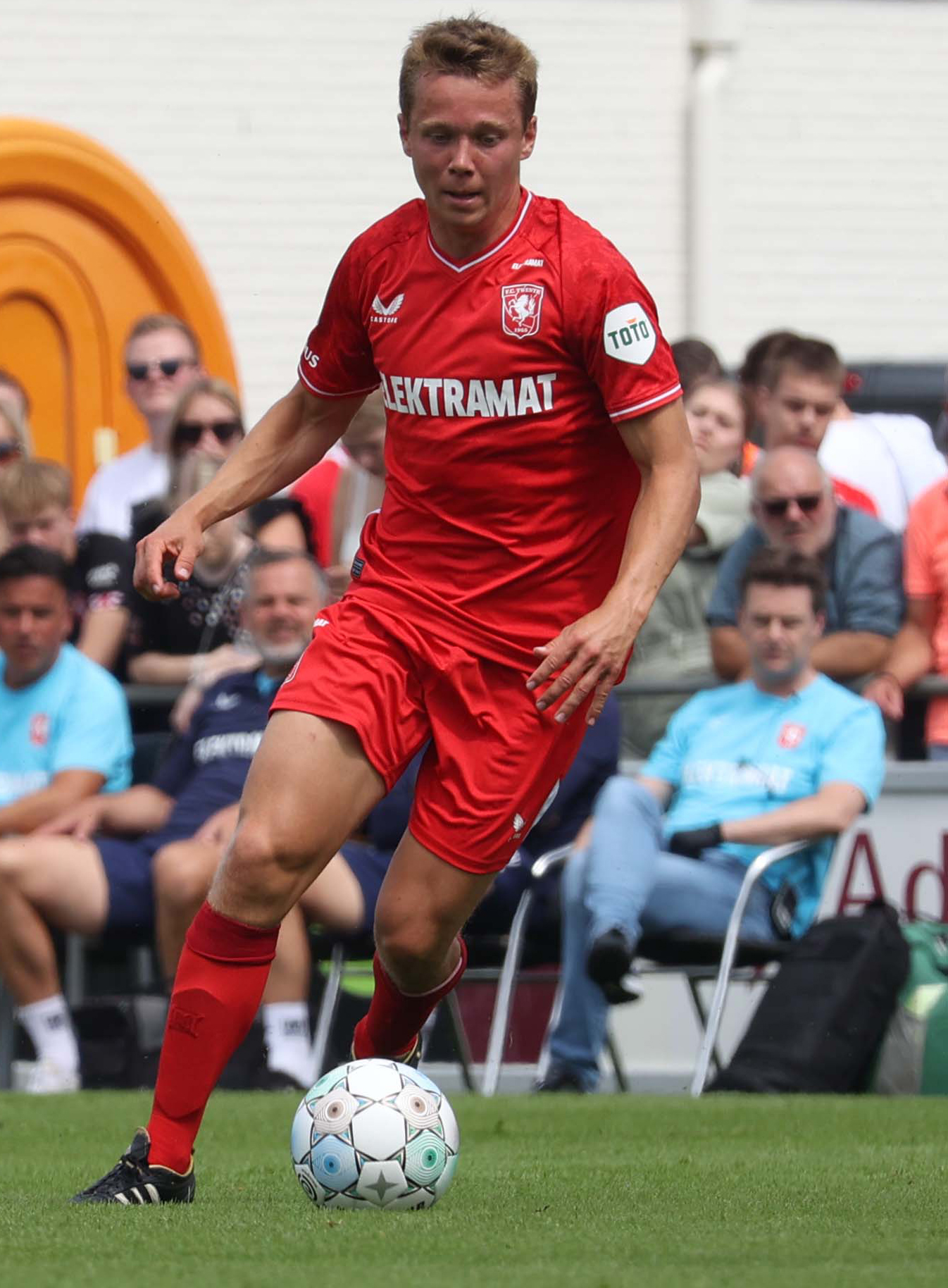
- Kjølø with Twente in 2023

Personal information
- Full name: Mathias Ullereng Kjølø
- Date of birth: 27 June 2001 (age 25)
- Place of birth: Oslo, Norway
- Height: 1.74 m (5 ft 9 in)
- Position: Midfielder

Team information
- Current team: Rosenborg
- Number: 6

Youth career
- –2016: Kjelsås
- 2017–2018: Vålerenga
- 2017–2018: → PSV (loan)
- 2018–2020: PSV

Senior career*
Years	Team	Apps	(Gls)
2020–2022	Jong PSV	75	(5)
2020–2022	PSV	1	(0)
2022–2026	Twente	100	(1)
2026–	Rosenborg	9	(0)

International career
2017	Norway U16	5	(0)
2017–2018	Norway U17	6	(0)
2019	Norway U18	10	(0)
2021–2022	Norway U21	2	(0)
- * Club domestic league appearances and goals as of 22 November 2026

Mathias Ullereng Kjølø (born 27 June 2001) is a Norwegian professional footballer who plays as a midfielder for Eliteserien club Rosenborg.

He is a son of Mike Kjølø, mainly known for his career with AIK.

== Club career ==
Kjølø was born in Oslo and played youth football with Kjelsås until 2016, after which he left for Vålerenga.

=== PSV ===
After six months with Vålerenga, he was sent on loan to Dutch club PSV Eindhoven, who then signed him to a permanent deal in 2018. He made his professional football debut for the reserve team Jong PSV in the second-tier Eerste Divisie on 13 January 2020 in a 0–0 draw at home against Jong Ajax. On 16 October 2020, he signed a two-year extension to his contract, keeping him at PSV until the summer of 2023.

He made his first-team debut for PSV on 8 November 2020 in a 3–0 Eredivisie win over Willem II, coming on as a substitute for Ibrahim Sangaré in the 88th minute.

=== Twente ===
On 8 June 2022, PSV announced that Kjølø had signed a long-term contract to join FC Twente ahead of the 2022–23 season.

=== Rosenborg ===
On 31 August 2026, Kjølø signed a four-and-a-half year deal with Rosenborg.

== International career ==
Kjølø played for various Norwegian national youth teams between 2017 and 2019. On 12 October 2021, he made his debut for the Norway national under-21 team in a 3–0 win over Estonia as a 78th-minute substitute for Johan Hove.

== Career statistics ==
As of match played 22 November 2026

Appearances and goals by club, season and competition
Club	Season	League			Cup		Europe		Other		Total	
Club	Season	Division	Apps	Goals	Apps	Goals	Apps	Goals	Apps	Goals	Apps	Goals
Jong PSV	2019–20	Eerste Divisie	8	0	—		—		—		8	0
Jong PSV	2020–21	Eerste Divisie	30	4	—		—		—		30	4
Jong PSV	2021–22	Eerste Divisie	37	1	—		—		—		37	1
Jong PSV	Total		75	5	—		—		—		75	5
PSV	2020–21	Eredivisie	1	0	0	0	0	0	0	0	1	0
Twente	2022–23	Eredivisie	25	0	1	0	2 (Note: Appearances in UEFA Conference League)	0	3 (Note: Appearances in Eredivisie play-offs)	0	31	0
Twente	2023–24	Eredivisie	31	1	1	0	6	0	—		38	1
Twente	2024–25	Eredivisie	24	0	2	0	8 (Note: Two appearances in UEFA Champions League, six appearances in UEFA Europa League)	0	—		34	0
Twente	2025–26	Eredivisie	19	0	2	0	—		—		21	0
Twente	2026–27	Eredivisie	1	0	0	0	4 (Note: One appearance in UEFA Europa League, three appearances in UEFA Conference League)	0	—		5	0
Twente	Total		100	1	6	0	20	0	3	0	129	1
Rosenborg	2026	Eliteserien	9	0	2	0	0	0	0	0	11	0
Career total			185	6	8	0	20	0	3	0	216	6
