= Marko Pjaca =

Croatian footballer (born 1995)

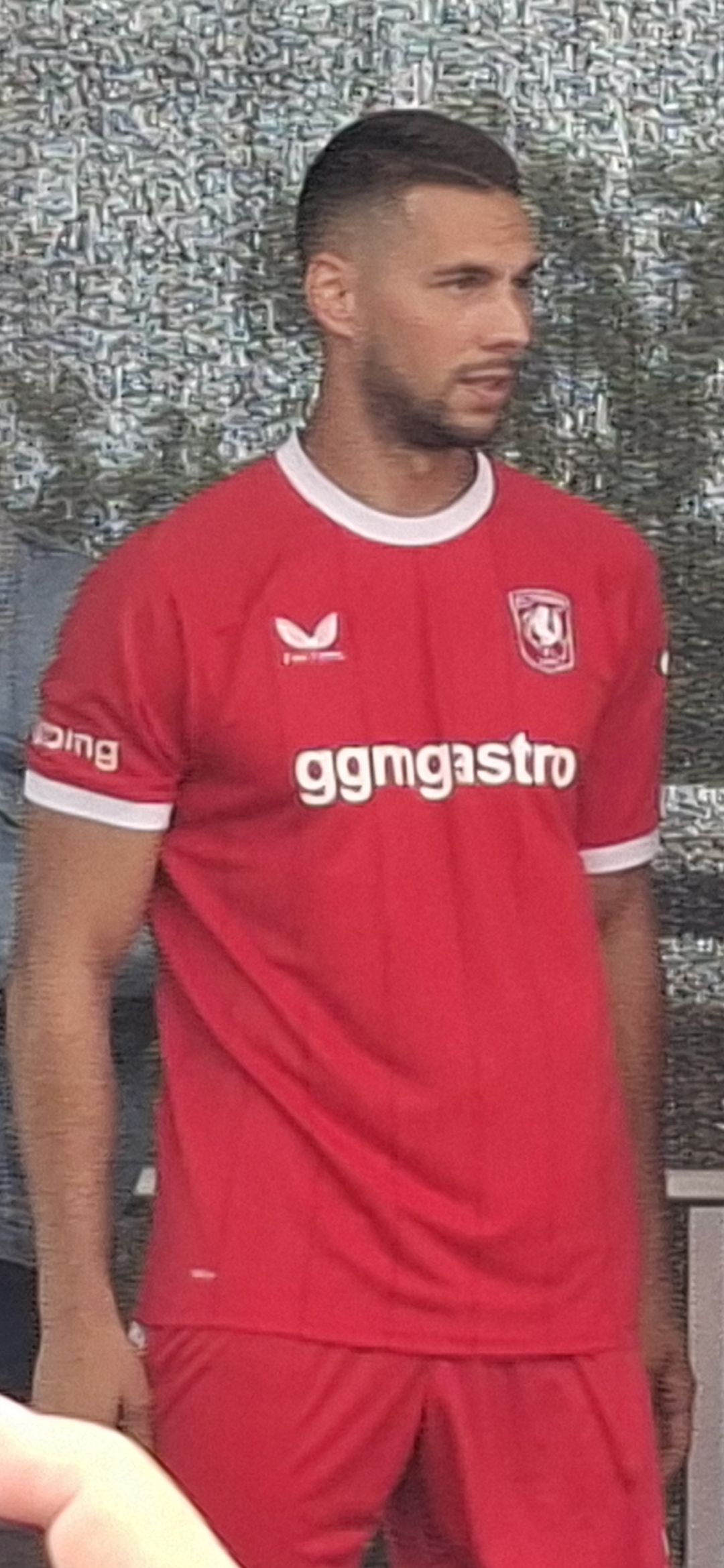
- Pjaca with Twente in 2026

Personal information
- Full name: Marko Pjaca
- Date of birth: 6 May 1995 (age 31)
- Place of birth: Zagreb, Croatia
- Height: 1.86 m (6 ft 1 in)
- Position: Winger

Team information
- Current team: Twente
- Number: 7

Youth career
- 2004–2009: Dinamo Zagreb
- 2009–2010: ZET
- 2010–2012: Lokomotiva Zagreb

Senior career*
Years	Team	Apps	(Gls)
2012–2014	Lokomotiva Zagreb	49	(9)
2014–2016	Dinamo Zagreb	61	(19)
2016–2023	Juventus	14	(0)
2018	→ Schalke 04 (loan)	7	(2)
2018–2019	→ Fiorentina (loan)	19	(1)
2020	→ Anderlecht (loan)	4	(1)
2020–2021	→ Genoa (loan)	35	(3)
2021–2022	→ Torino (loan)	24	(3)
2022–2023	→ Empoli (loan)	17	(0)
2023–2024	Rijeka	27	(7)
2024–2025	Dinamo Zagreb	34	(6)
2025–	Twente	36	(4)

International career
2011	Croatia U17	8	(1)
2012	Croatia U18	4	(0)
2012	Croatia U19	1	(0)
2013–2015	Croatia U20	5	(0)
2013–2017	Croatia U21	7	(0)
2014–2024	Croatia	28	(1)
Medal record
Men's football
Representing Croatia
FIFA World Cup
Runner-up	2018 Russia
- * Club domestic league appearances and goals as of 25 October 2026

Marko Pjaca (Croatian pronunciation: [mâːrko pjâtsa]; born 6 May 1995) is a Croatian professional footballer who plays as a left winger for Eredivisie club Twente.

Pjaca began his professional club career in Croatia with Lokomotiva Zagreb in 2012, before moving to Dinamo Zagreb in 2014. After winning consecutive domestic doubles with Dinamo, he joined Serie A team Juventus in 2016, where he also won a domestic double in his first season. However, after injuries hindered his development, Pjaca was sent out on a variety of loans to six clubs, namely Schalke, Fiorentina, Anderlecht, Genoa, Torino and Empoli, before joining Rijeka permanently in 2023.

At international level, Pjaca represented Croatia in the 2016 and 2024 UEFA European Championships and at the 2018 FIFA World Cup, reaching the final of the latter tournament as runners-up and making a single appearance in it.

== Early life ==
Pjaca grew up in Borovje. His father Željko, who moved to Zagreb from Herzegovina at a young age, was a wrestler and his mother Višnja was a judoka. In an interview for Zagorski list, Pjaca stated that his maternal grandmother is from Orehovec Radobojski in Zagorje. He has two elder sisters: Martina and Iva. As a child, he trained in handball, basketball and table tennis.

== Club career ==
=== Lokomotiva ===
Pjaca began his professional career with Croatian side Lokomotiva Zagreb. He made his debut in the 2011–12 Croatian First Football League on 24 February 2012 in a 3–0 victory over Zadar, in which he managed an assist. It was his only appearance that season. The following season, Pjaca was much more prominent in the first team, particularly after the winter break. He ended the 2012–13 Prva HNL season with 2 goals in 17 appearances. However, it was his performances in the 2013–14 Prva HNL season which largely caught the eye of bigger clubs, with the winger scoring 7 times in 31 appearances.

=== Dinamo Zagreb ===
In summer 2014, Pjaca was signed by reigning Croatian First Football League champions Dinamo Zagreb for a transfer fee believed to be in the region of €1 million. He made his Dinamo debut in the opening match of the 2014–15 season, when he scored against Slaven Belupo. On 11 December 2014, he scored a hat-trick as Dinamo defeated Celtic 4–3 in the last match of the 2014–15 UEFA Europa League group stage. Pjaca finished the season with 14 goals in 47 appearances in all competitions, as Dinamo won the league title for the tenth-straight season. Pjaca also played the full match as Dinamo beat RNK Split in the 2015 Croatian Football Cup Final on penalties. On 20 July 2016, Pjaca himself confirmed that the 2016–17 UEFA Champions League second qualifying round tie against Macedonian club Vardar would be his last for Dinamo. He scored two goals, assisted for the third and received a standing ovation from the fans in his farewell match at the Stadion Maksimir.

=== Juventus ===
On 21 July 2016, it was announced Pjaca signed a five-year contract with Juventus for a €23 million transfer fee to Dinamo. With the transfer, Pjaca became the most expensive ever sale by Dinamo and the Croatian First Football League.

Pjaca made his Juventus and Serie A debut on 27 August, coming on as a substitute for Paulo Dybala in the second half of a 1–0 away win over Lazio. In October 2016, Pjaca suffered a cracked fibula while on international duty with Croatia, and was initially expected to miss around six weeks of the season. After being sidelined through injury for almost three months, in January 2017, he returned to action with two half-hour-long substitute appearances against Atalanta in the Coppa Italia and Fiorentina in Serie A. He scored his first goal for Juventus in the first leg of the Champions League round of 16 tie against Porto, a 2–0 away win. Pjaca suffered an anterior cruciate ligament (ACL) injury on 28 March while on international duty with Croatia, sidelining him for six months.

==== Loan to Schalke 04 ====
After returning from a long term ACL injury, on 4 January 2018, it was announced that Pjaca had joined German club Schalke 04 on loan without an option to buy until the end of the 2017–18 season, for €800,000, plus an additional €200,000 in possible bonuses. At the moment German giants were chasing a place that takes them to the UEFA Champions League and coach Tedesco saw Marko as a player who can help them achieve their goals. On the other hand, in Schalke Marko could get his playing time to get back in his best form before the FIFA World Cup at the end of the season. Pjaca made his official club debut on 13 January, coming on as a second-half substitute in a 3–1 away defeat to RB Leipzig. In his second appearance for the club, and his first start, on 21 January, he scored his first goal in a 1–1 home draw against Hannover 96.

==== Loan to Fiorentina ====
On 7 August 2018, Pjaca joined Fiorentina on a season-long loan deal with the option to make the transfer permanent for an undisclosed fee.

==== Loan to Anderlecht ====
On 31 January 2020, during the winter transfer deadline day, Belgian club Anderlecht signed Pjaca on loan until the end of the season.

==== Loan to Genoa ====
On 19 September 2020, Pjaca moved on a season-long loan to Genoa. On his debut the following day, Pjaca scored his first goal for the club in a 4–1 win against Crotone.

==== Loan to Torino ====
On 28 July 2021, Pjaca joined Torino on loan with an option to buy.

==== Loan to Empoli ====
On 1 September 2022, Pjaca moved on loan to Empoli, with an option to buy.

=== Rijeka ===
On 1 September 2023, Pjaca returned to Croatia and signed a three-year contract with Rijeka.

=== Return to Dinamo Zagreb ===
On 3 July 2024, Pjaca rejoined Dinamo Zagreb for a transfer fee of €1,500,000.

== International career ==
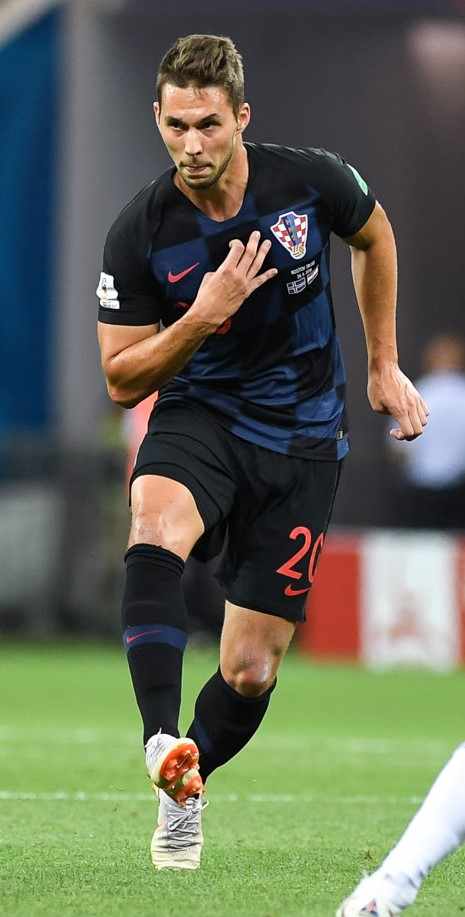
Pjaca playing for Croatia at the 2018 FIFA World Cup

Pjaca made his senior international debut for Croatia on 4 September 2014, replacing Mateo Kovačić for the last 12 minutes of a 2–0 friendly win over Cyprus at the Stadion Aldo Drosina in Pula. On 3 September 2015, he made his competitive debut for the national team in the UEFA Euro 2016 qualifying match against Azerbaijan, starting and playing the entire fixture, which ended in a 0–0 draw. On 4 June 2016, he scored his first international goal for Croatia in a 10–0 win over San Marino.

=== Euro 2016 ===
Pjaca was included in Croatia's UEFA Euro 2016 squad. He played a major role in Croatia's impressive 2–1 victory against Spain, the reigning European champions, at Bordeaux's Nouveau Stade de Bordeaux. During that match, he completed an impressive seven of his eight attempted take-ons, took one shot, created one clear scoring opportunity and won one tackle. Pjaca took a seat on the substitutes' bench for the clash with Portugal in the next round, only to be brought on late in extra time with just ten minutes of the additional 30 remaining. Being introduced as a substitute, he brought some much-needed attacking impetus to the side, completing three dribbles against a previously impenetrable Portugal defence. Croatia eventually lost to Portugal 1–0 after Portugal's Ricardo Quaresma scored a 117th-minute winner to eliminate Croatia.

=== 2018 World Cup ===
On 4 June 2018, Pjaca was named to Croatia's final 23-man squad for the 2018 FIFA World Cup. Croatia reached the final of the tournament, where they were defeated 4–2 by France on 15 July.

=== Return to national team and Euro 2024 ===
Pjaca played against Spain in a 3–2 win in the UEFA Nations League on 15 November 2018, but then went five years without a cap. He was recalled to the national team for Euro 2024 qualifying matches in November 2023, but did not play. He finally made his on-field return in a 4–2 friendly win over Egypt on 28 March 2024, his first match for his country in nearly six years.

On 7 June 2024, Pjaca was named in Zlatko Dalić's 26-man squad for UEFA Euro 2024.

== Style of play ==
Pjaca is a winger who is capable of playing on either flank, although his preferred position is on the left, where he likes to cut inside from wide positions and either shoot on goal or create chances with his stronger right foot; he has also been deployed as an attacking midfielder or as a second striker on occasion. A dynamic, agile and technically gifted player, Pjaca is known for his direct and offensive style of play. Due to his physique, speed, dribbling skills and ability to change direction quickly, he often takes on players in one-on-one situations, and is also known for his ability to make intelligent attacking runs behind the opponents' defensive line.

== Career statistics ==
=== Club ===
As of match played 25 October 2026

Appearances and goals by club, season and competition
Club	Season	League			National cup (Note: Includes Croatian Football Cup, Copa Italia, DFB-Pokal)		Europe		Other		Total	
Club	Season	Division	Apps	Goals	Apps	Goals	Apps	Goals	Apps	Goals	Apps	Goals
Lokomotiva Zagreb	2011–12	Prva HNL	1	0	0	0	–		–		1	0
Lokomotiva Zagreb	2012–13	Prva HNL	17	2	6	2	–		–		23	4
Lokomotiva Zagreb	2013–14	Prva HNL	30	7	0	0	2 (Note: Appearances in UEFA Europa League)	0	–		32	7
Lokomotiva Zagreb	Total		48	9	6	2	2	0	–		56	11
Dinamo Zagreb	2014–15	Prva HNL	32	11	7	0	8 (Note: Four appearances in UEFA Champions League, four appearances and three goals in UEFA Europa League)	3	1 (Note: Appearance in Croatian Super Cup)	0	48	14
Dinamo Zagreb	2015–16	Prva HNL	28	8	3	1	12 (Note: Appearance(s) in UEFA Champions League)	3	–		43	12
Dinamo Zagreb	2016–17	Prva HNL	1	0	—		1	2	–		2	2
Dinamo Zagreb	Total		61	19	10	1	21	8	1	0	93	28
Juventus	2016–17	Serie A	14	0	2	0	4	1	0	0	20	1
Juventus	2017–18	Serie A	0	0	0	0	0	0	0	0	0	0
Juventus	2019–20	Serie A	0	0	1	0	0	0	0	0	1	0
Juventus	Total		14	0	3	0	4	1	0	0	21	1
Schalke 04 (loan)	2017–18	Bundesliga	7	2	2	0	–		–		9	2
Fiorentina (loan)	2018–19	Serie A	19	1	0	0	–		–		19	1
Anderlecht (loan)	2019–20	Belgian Pro League	4	1	0	0	–		–		4	1
Genoa (loan)	2020–21	Serie A	35	3	3	0	–		–		38	3
Torino (loan)	2021–22	Serie A	24	3	2	0	–		–		26	3
Empoli (loan)	2022–23	Serie A	17	0	0	0	–		–		17	0
Rijeka	2023–24	HNL	27	7	4	0	–		–		31	7
Dinamo Zagreb	2024–25	HNL	34	6	2	0	8	3	–		44	9
Twente	2025–26	Eredivisie	27	2	2	0	—		—		29	2
Twente	2026–27	Eredivisie	9	2	0	0	7 (Note: One appearance in UEFA Europa League, six appearances and four goals in UEFA Conference League)	4	—		16	6
Twente	Total		35	4	2	0	7	4	—		45	8
Career total			325	55	34	3	42	14	1	0	403	74

=== International ===
Appearances and goals by national team and year
National team	Year	Apps	Goals
Croatia	2014	1	0
Croatia	2015	5	0
Croatia	2016	6	1
Croatia	2017	1	0
Croatia	2018	11	0
Croatia	2024	4	0
Total		28	1

Scores and results list Croatia's goal tally first.

List of international goals scored by Marko Pjaca
No.	Date	Venue	Cap	Opponent	Score	Result	Competition
1	4 June 2016	Stadion Rujevica, Rijeka, Croatia	8	San Marino	1–0	10–0	Friendly

== Honours ==
Dinamo Zagreb

- Prva HNL: 2014–15, 2015–16
- Croatian Cup: 2014–15, 2015–16

Juventus

- Serie A: 2016–17, 2017–18
- Coppa Italia: 2016–17

Croatia

- FIFA World Cup runner-up: 2018

Individual

- Football Oscar Best Prva HNL player: 2015, 2016
- Croatian Football League Team of the Year: 2014–15, 2015–16, 2023–24

Orders

- Order of Duke Branimir: 2018
