= Stav Lemkin =

Israeli association footballer (born 2003)

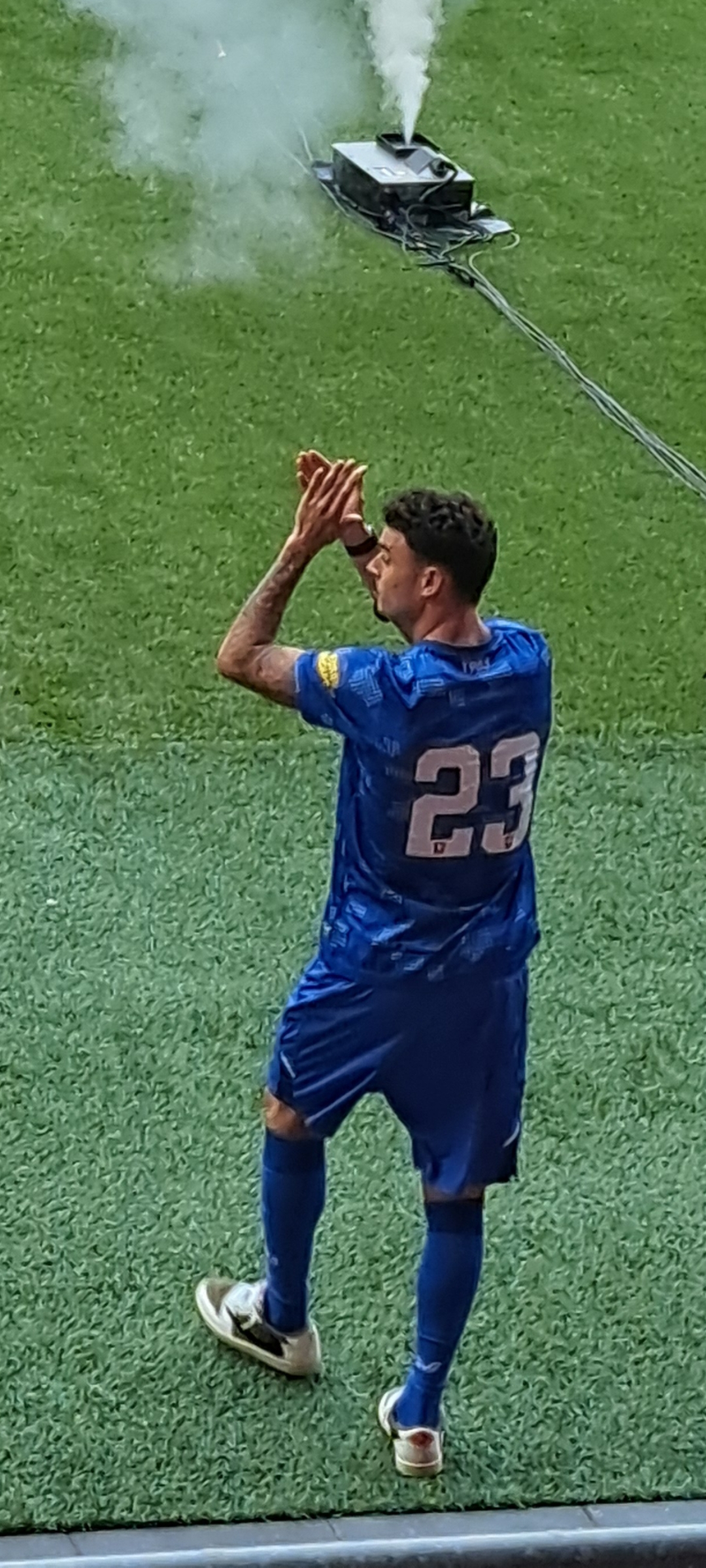

Personal information
- Date of birth: 2 April 2003 (age 23)
- Place of birth: Tel Aviv, Israel
- Height: 1.90 m (6 ft 3 in)
- Position: Center-back

Team information
- Current team: FC Twente
- Number: 23

Youth career
- 2011–2018: Maccabi Tel Aviv
- 2018–2023: Hapoel Tel Aviv

Senior career*
Years	Team	Apps	(Gls)
2021–2023	Hapoel Tel Aviv	31	(0)
2023–2025	Shakhtar Donetsk	4	(0)
2024–2025	→ Maccabi Tel Aviv (loan)	21	(0)
2025–	Twente	25	(0)

International career^{‡}
2018	Israel U16	5	(1)
2019–2020	Israel U17	4	(0)
2021–2022	Israel U19	15	(1)
2023	Israel U20	6	(0)
2022–2024	Israel U21	16	(1)
2023–	Israel	10	(0)
Medal record
Representing Israel U-19
UEFA European Under-19 Championship
Runner-up	2022 Slovakia	Team
Representing Israel U-20
FIFA U-20 World Cup
Third place	2023 Argentina	Team
- * Club domestic league appearances and goals as of 17 May 2026 ‡ National team caps and goals as of 19:45, 3 June 2026 (UTC)

Stav Lemkin (or Lamkin Hebrew: סתיו למקין; born 2 April 2003) is an Israeli professional footballer who plays as a center-back for Eredivisie club Twente, and the Israel national team.

== Early and personal life ==
Lemkin was born and raised in Tel Aviv, Israel. His father is Israeli lawyer Shachar Lemkin, who also manages his football career. His mother Yana Lemkin is a designer and a social-volunteer in Israel, who hails from Soviet Ukraine (now Ukraine) before her immigration to Israel, although she still has some relatives who reside in Ukraine.

He also holds a Spanish passport, on account of his Sephardi Jewish ancestors, which eases the move to certain European football leagues.

== International career ==
Since early youth, he had capped internationally with the Israel national under-16 team (2018), the Israel national under-17 team (2019–2020), the Israel national under-19 team (2021–2022), the Israel national under-20 team (2023), and the Israel national under-21 team (2022 debut).

He made his senior debut for the Israel national team in 2023.

== Career statistics ==
=== Club ===
As of match played 30 July 2026

Appearances and goals by club, season and competition
Club	Season	League			National cup		League cup		Continental		Other		Total	
Club	Season	Division	Apps	Goals	Apps	Goals	Apps	Goals	Apps	Goals	Apps	Goals	Apps	Goals
Hapoel Tel Aviv	2021–22	Israeli Premier League	9	0	0	0	0	0	–		0	0	9	0
Hapoel Tel Aviv	2022–23	Israeli Premier League	22	0	0	0	5	0	–		0	0	27	0
Hapoel Tel Aviv	Total		31	0	0	0	5	0	0	0	0	0	36	0
Shakhtar Donetsk	2023–24	Ukrainian Premier League	4	0	0	0	—		1 (Note: Appearances in UEFA Champions League)	0	0	0	5	0
Maccabi Tel Aviv (loan)	2024–25	Israeli Premier League	21	0	2	0	0	0	5 (Note: Appearances in UEFA Europa League)	0	—		28	0
Twente	2025–26	Eredivisie	25	0	4	0	—		—		—		29	0
Twente	2026–27	Eredivisie	0	0	0	0	—		2 (Note: Two appearances in UEFA Europa League)	0	—		2	0
Twente	Total		25	0	4	0	—		2	0	—		31	0
Career total			81	0	6	0	5	0	8	0	0	0	100	0

=== International ===
As of match played 3 June 2026

Appearances and goals by national team and year
National team	Year	Apps	Goals
Israel	2023	3	0
Israel	2025	5	0
Israel	2026	2	0
Total		10	0

== Honours ==
Individual

- UEFA European Under-19 Championship Team of the Tournament: 2022

== See also ==
- List of Israelis
- List of Israel international footballers
