= Sondre Ørjasæter =

Norwegian footballer (born 2003)

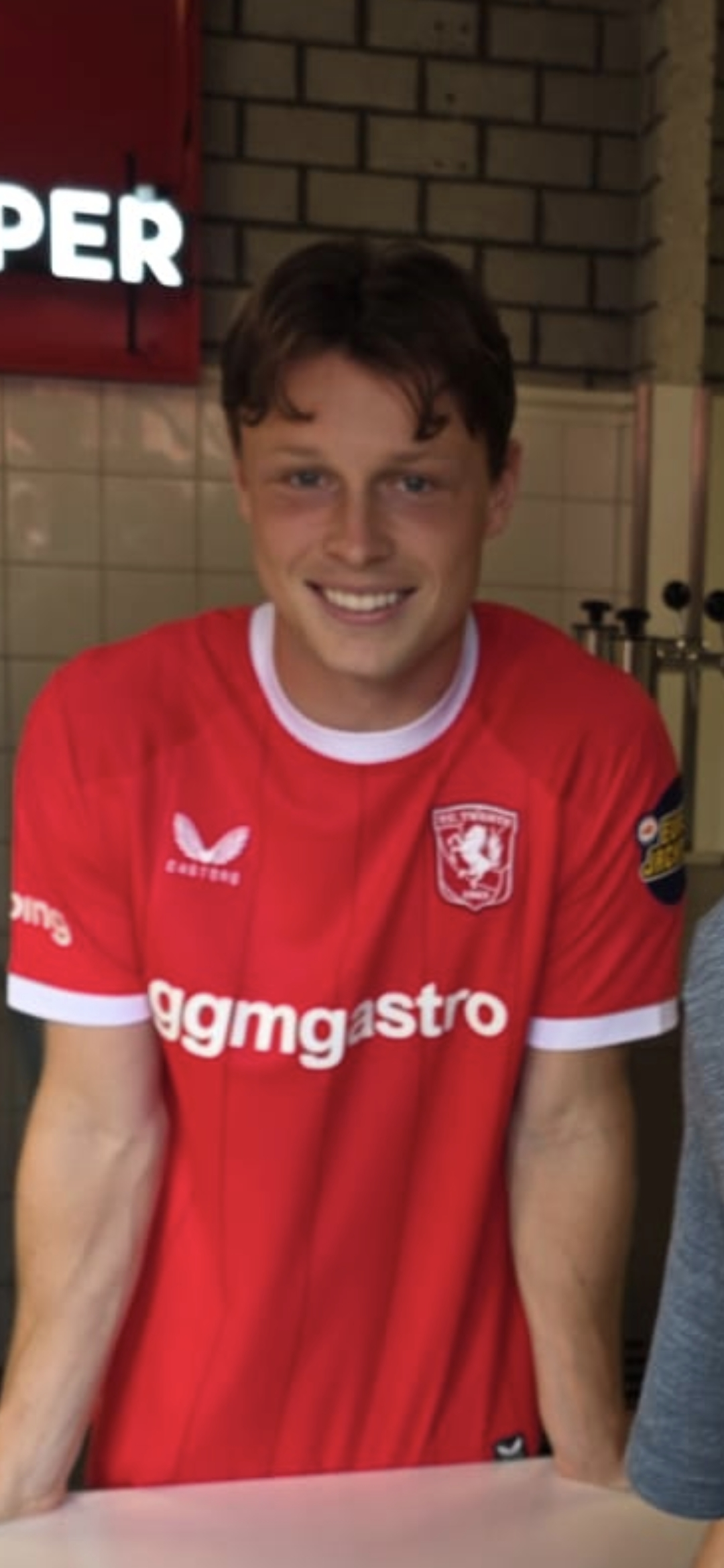
- Ørjasæter with Twente in 2026

Personal information
- Full name: Sondre Holmlund Ørjasæter
- Date of birth: 28 November 2003 (age 22)
- Place of birth: Oslo, Norway
- Height: 1.80 m (5 ft 11 in)
- Position: Winger

Team information
- Current team: Twente
- Number: 27

Youth career
- –2016: Lyn
- 2018: Korsvoll
- 2019: Lyn
- 2019–2021: Stryn

Senior career*
Years	Team	Apps	(Gls)
2021	Stryn	10	(10)
2022–2023	Sogndal	57	(8)
2024–2025	Sarpsborg 08	42	(7)
2025–	Twente	39	(5)

International career^{‡}
2023	Norway U20	2	(0)
2023–2024	Norway U21	7	(0)
- * Club domestic league appearances and goals as of 25 October 2026 ‡ National team caps and goals as of 19 November 2024

Sondre Holmlund Ørjasæter (born 28 November 2003) is a Norwegian footballer who plays as a left winger for Eredivisie club FC Twente.

== Career ==
=== Early years ===
Ørjasæter was born and grew up in Oslo. While a youth player in Lyn, he initially quit football as a child and would rather hang out and do shenanigans with friends. He did return to football with a stint in Korsvoll and another in Lyn's boys-16 team, but in the autumn of 2019 his family uprooted and moved to rural Stryn Municipality for his father's work. With there being few leisure activities for Ørjasæter in Stryn, he joined Stryn TIL. Two years later, he joined their senior team in 4. divisjon and played as a regular. According to Håvard Flo, he started becoming noticed in the district as "an artist" on the field.

=== Sogndal ===
Ørjasæter was signed by regional powerhouse Sogndal ahead of the 2022 season, and ended up playing most of the games. In 2023 he became a dominant player, receiving his first international callup, for Norway U21. A summer transfer to SK Brann was rumoured, and Ørjasæter acquired Jim Solbakken as his agent. He also improved his professionalism off the field, regarding food and sleep.

=== Sarpsborg 08 ===
At the start of the 2024 season, Ørjasæter signed for Eliteserien side Sarpsborg 08.

=== Twente ===
On 13 August 2025, Ørjasæter signed a four-year contract with Eredivisie side Twente. On 30 October, he scored his first goal for the club in a 4–1 away win over ROHDA Raalte in the KNVB Cup. On 1 March 2026, he netted his first Eredivisie goal and provided an assist in a 2–0 victory over Feyenoord. Later that year, on 1 November, he recorded five assists in a 9–0 away victory over Excelsior, equalling the record previously set by Coen Moulijn in 1959 and 1960.

== Career statistics ==
=== Club ===
As of match played 25 October 2026

Club	Season	League			Cup (Note: Includes Norwegian Football Cup, KNVB Cup)		Europe		Total	
Club	Season	Division	Apps	Goals	Apps	Goals	Apps	Goals	Apps	Goals
Stryn	2021	Norwegian Fourth Division	10	10	0	0	—		10	10
Sogndal	2022	Norwegian First Division	27	2	2	1	—		29	3
Sogndal	2023	Norwegian First Division	30	6	4	0	—		34	6
Sogndal	Total		57	8	6	1	—		63	9
Sarpsborg 08	2024	Eliteserien	28	5	4	0	—		32	5
Sarpsborg 08	2025	Eliteserien	14	2	3	1	—		17	3
Sarpsborg 08	Total		42	7	7	1	—		49	8
Twente	2025–26	Eredivisie	30	3	4	2	—		34	5
Twente	2026–27	Eredivisie	9	2	0	0	7 (Note: Two appearances in UEFA Europa League, five appearances in UEFA Conference League)	0	16	2
Twente	Total		39	5	4	2	7	0	50	7
Career total			148	30	17	4	7	0	172	34
