= Max Bruns =

Dutch footballer

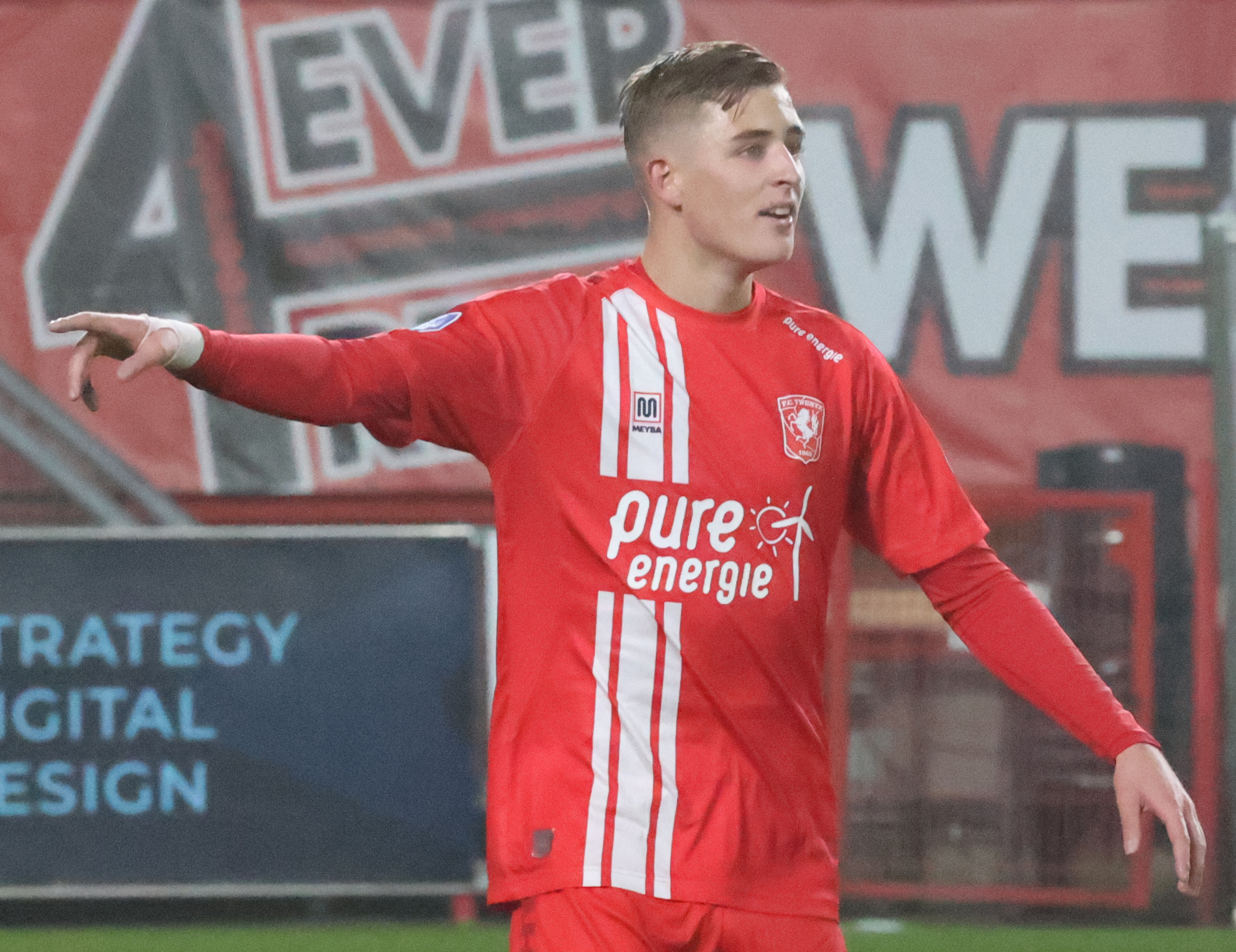
- Bruns with Twente

Personal information
- Date of birth: 6 November 2002 (age 24)
- Place of birth: Almelo, Netherlands
- Height: 1.85 m (6 ft 1 in)
- Position: Centre-back

Team information
- Current team: Twente
- Number: 38

Youth career
- 2009–2015: MVV '29
- 2016–2021: Twente

Senior career*
Years	Team	Apps	(Gls)
2021–	Twente	67	(1)

International career^{‡}
2024–	Netherlands U21	6	(1)
- * Club domestic league appearances and goals as of 20 September 2026 ‡ National team caps and goals as of 25 March 2025

Max Bruns (born 6 November 2002) is a Dutch professional footballer who plays as a centre-back for Eredivisie club Twente.

== Career ==
Bruns originally played for MVV '29 from Harbrinkhoek, before joining the Twente youth academy in 2016.

Bruns made his professional debut with Twente in a 3–0 Eredivisie loss to PSV on 6 February 2021. On 17 February 2021, he signed his first professional contract with Twente for 2+1 years.

== Career statistics ==
As of 20 September 2026

Appearances and goals by club, season and competition
Club	Season	League			National cup		Europe		Other		Total	
Club	Season	Division	Apps	Goals	Apps	Goals	Apps	Goals	Apps	Goals	Apps	Goals
Twente	2020–21	Eredivisie	1	0	0	0	—		—		1	0
Twente	2021–22	Eredivisie	3	0	0	0	—		—		3	0
Twente	2022–23	Eredivisie	9	0	2	0	1 (Note: Appearances in UEFA Europa Conference League)	0	—		12	0
Twente	2023–24	Eredivisie	12	0	1	0	4	0	—		17	0
Twente	2024–25	Eredivisie	25	0	0	0	7 (Note: Appearances in UEFA Europa League)	0	—		32	0
Twente	2025–26	Eredivisie	11	1	1	0	—		—		12	1
Twente	2026–27	Eredivisie	6	0	0	0	4	3	—		10	3
Career total			67	1	4	0	16	3	0	0	87	4
