= Krzysztof Kurowski =

Polish footballer (born 2006)

- Kurowski with Twente in 2026

Personal information
- Date of birth: 29 August 2006 (age 20)
- Place of birth: Wrocław, Poland
- Height: 1.80 m (5 ft 11 in)
- Position: Left-back

Team information
- Current team: Twente
- Number: 24

Youth career
- –2018: Śląsk Wrocław
- 2018–2021: Olympic Wrocław
- 2021–2023: Śląsk Wrocław

Senior career*
| Years | Team | Apps | (Gls) |
| 2023–2025 | Śląsk Wrocław II | 47 | (4) |
| 2023–2026 | Śląsk Wrocław | 27 | (2) |
| 2026– | Twente | 1 | (0) |

International career^{‡}
| 2023 | Poland U17 | 7 | (0) |
| 2024–2025 | Poland U19 | 9 | (0) |
| 2026– | Poland U20 | 2 | (1) |
- * Club domestic league appearances and goals as of 09:48, 19 September 2026 (UTC) ‡ National team caps and goals as of 08:34, 30 September 2026 (UTC)

Krzysztof Kurowski (born 29 August 2006) is a Polish professional footballer who plays as a left-back for Eredivisie club Twente.

== Club career ==
Kurowski began his footballing development at the youth academy of Śląsk Wrocław, the club of his home city, before joining Olympic Wrocław in 2018. In early 2021, he returned to Śląsk's youth setup. He progressed through the ranks before featuring for Śląsk's third and reserve sides in regional competition. In August 2023, Kurowski made his senior debut for Śląsk Wrocław in the Ekstraklasa, becoming the third-youngest debutant in the club's top-flight history at the age of 16 years, 11 months and 14 days. His debut came in the fourth round of the 2023–24 Ekstraklasa season, in a 3–1 away loss to Stal Mielec. He subsequently suffered a serious injury that curtailed his progress in the 2023–24 season. During the 2024–25 season, Kurowski made eight appearances for Śląsk's first team across all competitions. In the 2025–26 season, he made 18 league appearances, scoring twice and providing three assists, and a further 12 appearances for Śląsk's reserve side.

On 24 June 2026, Kurowski joined Twente on a free transfer on a contract until June 2030, with an option for a further season.

== International career ==
Kurowski has represented Poland at youth level across the under-17 and under-19 categories. He has accumulated 16 youth international appearances. He was part of the Poland U17 squad that made the semi-finals of the 2023 UEFA European Under-17 Championship.

== Career statistics ==
As of match played 30 August 2026

Appearances and goals by club, season and competition
| Club | Season | League | | | National cup (Note: Includes Polish Cup) | | Europe | | Other | | Total | |
| Club | Season | Division | Apps | Goals | Apps | Goals | Apps | Goals | Apps | Goals | Apps | Goals |
|---|---|---|---|---|---|---|---|---|---|---|---|---|
| Śląsk Wrocław II | 2022–23 | II liga | 4 | 0 | — | | — | | — | | 5 | 0 |
| Śląsk Wrocław II | 2023–24 | III liga | 9 | 0 | 0 | 0 | — | | — | | 9 | 0 |
| Śląsk Wrocław II | 2024–25 | III liga | 22 | 1 | — | | — | | — | | 22 | 1 |
| Śląsk Wrocław II | 2025–26 | II liga | 12 | 3 | — | | — | | — | | 12 | 3 |
| Śląsk Wrocław II | Total | | 47 | 4 | — | | — | | — | | 47 | 4 |
| Śląsk Wrocław | 2023–24 | Ekstraklasa | 2 | 0 | 0 | 0 | — | | — | | 2 | 0 |
| Śląsk Wrocław | 2024–25 | Ekstraklasa | 7 | 0 | 1 | 0 | 0 | 0 | — | | 8 | 0 |
| Śląsk Wrocław | 2025–26 | I liga | 18 | 2 | 3 | 0 | — | | — | | 21 | 2 |
| Śląsk Wrocław | Total | | 27 | 2 | 4 | 0 | 0 | 0 | — | | 31 | 2 |
| Twente | 2026–27 | Eredivisie | 1 | 0 | 0 | 0 | 1 (Note: Appearances in UEFA Conference League) | 0 | — | | 2 | 0 |
| Career total | | | 75 | 6 | 4 | 0 | 1 | 0 | 0 | 0 | 80 | 6 |
