= Daouda Weidmann =

French association footballer (born 2003)

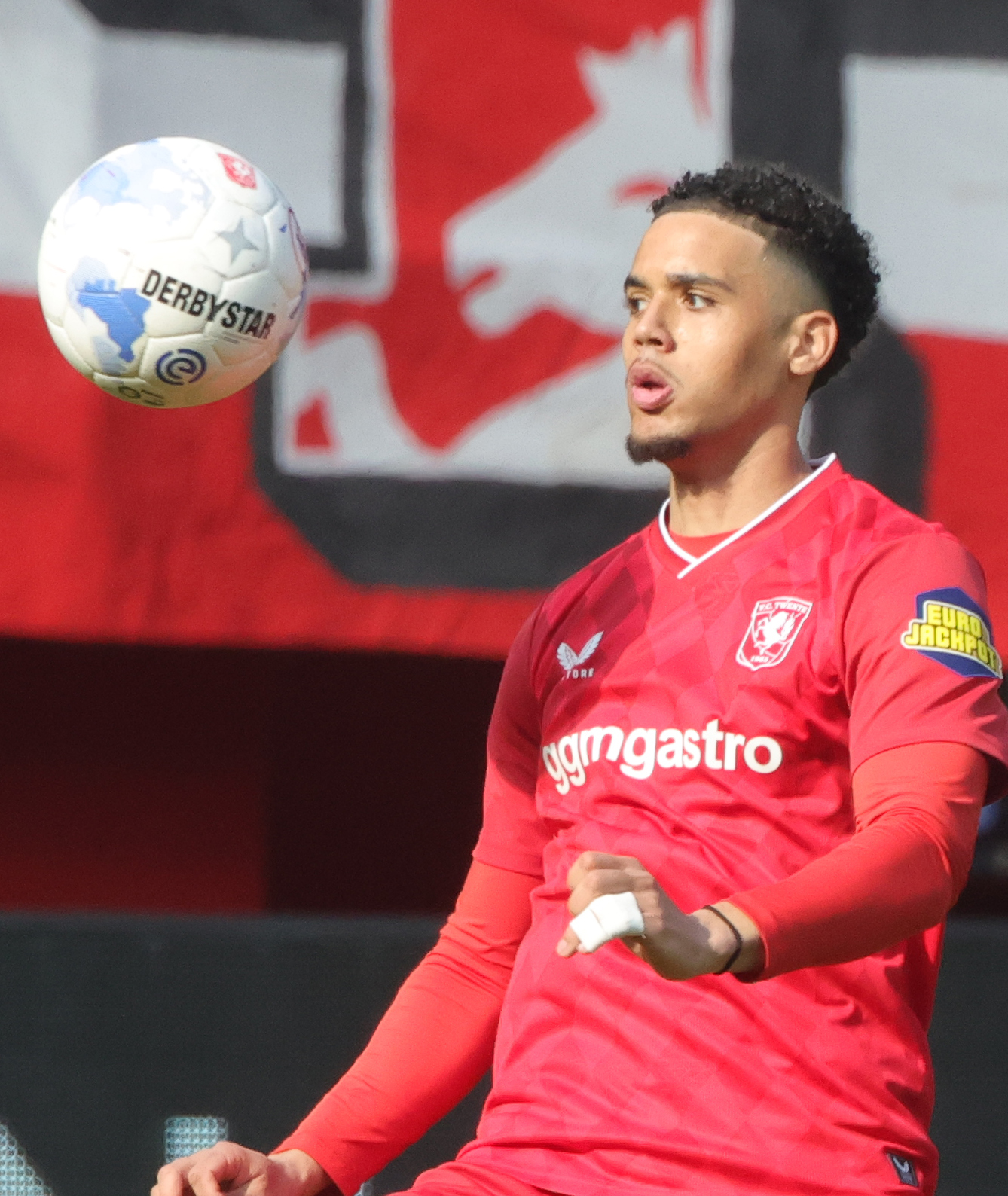
- Weidmann in 2026

Personal information
- Full name: Daouda Yoaness William Weidmann
- Date of birth: 4 May 2003 (age 23)
- Place of birth: Paris, France
- Height: 1.80 m (5 ft 11 in)
- Position: Midfielder

Team information
- Current team: Twente
- Number: 42

Youth career
- Red Star
- Paris FC
- 2016–2022: Paris Saint-Germain
- 2022–2023: Torino

Senior career*
Years	Team	Apps	(Gls)
2023–2024	Torino	0	(0)
2023–2024	→ RKC Waalwijk (loan)	3	(0)
2024–2025	RKC Waalwijk	16	(2)
2025–	Twente	25	(3)
- * Club domestic league appearances and goals as of 25 October 2026

Daouda Yoaness William Weidmann (born 4 May 2003) is a French professional footballer who plays as a midfielder for Eredivisie club Twente.

== Career ==
Weidmann is a youth product of the Parisian clubs Red Star and Paris FC before moving to the youth academy of Paris Saint-Germain on 8 January 2016. On 18 June 2021, he signed his first professional contract with Paris Saint-Germain until 2024. On 3 August 2022, he transferred to the Italian club Torino where he was initially assigned to their Primavera side. On 29 August 2023, he joined the Eredivisie club Waalwijk on loan for the 2023–24 season. He made his senior and professional debut with Waalwijk in a 3–2 Eredivisie loss to Ajax on 30 September 2023.

At the end of the 2023–24 season, Weidmann transferred to RKC Waalwijk permanently and signed a four-year contract.

On 1 September 2025, Weidmann signed a five-year contract with Twente.

== Personal life ==
Born in France, Weidmann is of Ivorian descent.

== Career statistics ==
As of match played 25 October 2026

Appearances and goals by club, season and competition
Club	Season	League			National cup (Note: Includes Coppa Italia, KNVB Cup)		Europe		Other		Total	
Club	Season	Division	Apps	Goals	Apps	Goals	Apps	Goals	Apps	Goals	Apps	Goals
Torino	2023–24	Serie A	0	0	0	0	—		0	0	0	0
RKC Waalwijk (loan)	2023–24	Eredivisie	3	0	1	0	—		—		4	0
RKC Waalwijk	2024–25	Eredivisie	12	0	1	0	—		—		13	0
RKC Waalwijk	2025–26	Eerste Divisie	4	2	0	0	—		—		4	2
RKC Waalwijk	Total		16	2	1	0	—		—		17	2
Twente	2025–26	Eredivisie	16	0	3	1	—		—		19	1
Twente	2026–27	Eredivisie	9	3	0	0	7 (Note: One appearance in UEFA Europa League, six appearances and two goals in UEFA Conference League)	2	—		16	5
Twente	Total		25	3	3	1	7	2	—		35	6
Career total			44	5	5	1	7	2	0	0	56	8
