= Lucas Vennegoor of Hesselink =

Dutch footballer (born 2006)

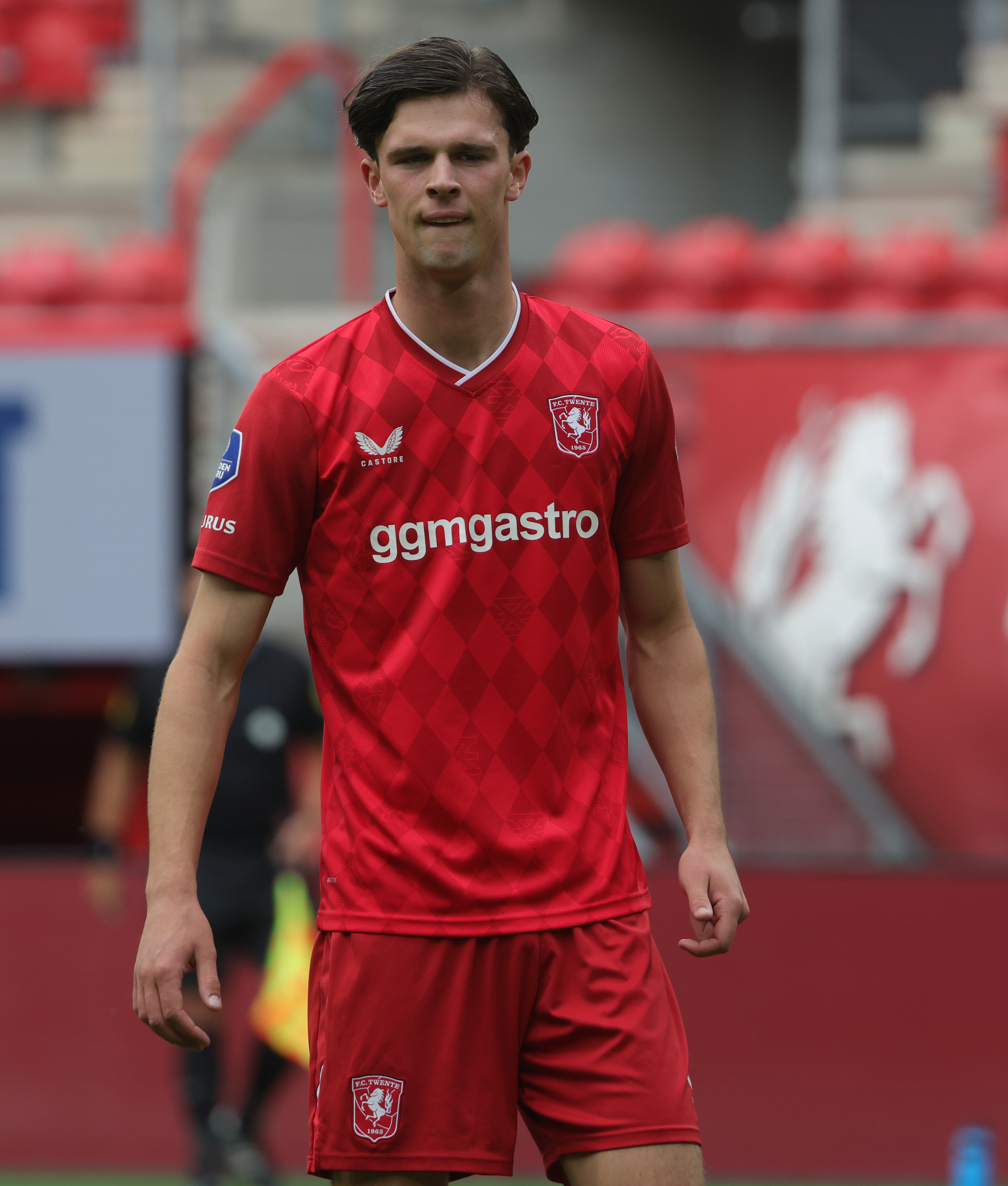
- Vennegoor of Hesselink with Twente in 2025

Personal information
- Date of birth: 14 March 2006 (age 20)
- Place of birth: Oldenzaal, Netherlands
- Height: 1.92 m (6 ft 4 in)
- Position: Forward

Team information
- Current team: Twente
- Number: 25

Youth career
- Quick '20
- 2016–2025: Twente

Senior career*
Years	Team	Apps	(Gls)
2025–	Twente	20	(1)

International career^{‡}
2024–	Netherlands U19	4	(1)
Medal record
Men's football
Representing Netherlands
UEFA European Under-19 Championship
Winner	2025 Romania
- * Club domestic league appearances and goals as of 22:00, 25 October 2026 (UTC) ‡ National team caps and goals as of 23 June 2025

Lucas Vennegoor of Hesselink (born 14 March 2006) is a Dutch professional footballer who plays as forward for Eredivisie club Twente. He is also the son of former Dutch international footballer Jan Vennegoor of Hesselink.

== Club career ==
A youth product of Quick '20, Vennegoor of Hesselink moved to the academy of Twente in 2016. On 14 March 2024, he signed his first professional contract with Twente until 2027. He made his senior and professional debut with Twente in a 6–2 Eredivisie tie win over Willem II on 12 January 2025.

== International career ==
Vennegoor of Hesselink made the final Netherlands U19 squad for the 2025 UEFA European Under-19 Championship.

== Career statistics ==
As of match played 25 October 2026

Appearances and goals by club, season and competition
Club	Season	League			National cup		Other		Total	
Club	Season	Division	Apps	Goals	Apps	Goals	Apps	Goals	Apps	Goals
Twente	2024–25	Eredivisie	8	0	—		0	0	8	0
Twente	2025–26	Eredivisie	5	0	1	0	—		6	0
Twente	2026–27	Eredivisie	7	1	0	0	5 (Note: One appearance and one goal in UEFA Europa League, four appearances in UEFA Conference League)	1	12	2
Career total			20	1	1	0	5	1	26	2

== Honours ==
Netherlands U19

- UEFA European Under-19 Championship: 2025
