= Mats Rots =

Dutch footballer (born 2006)

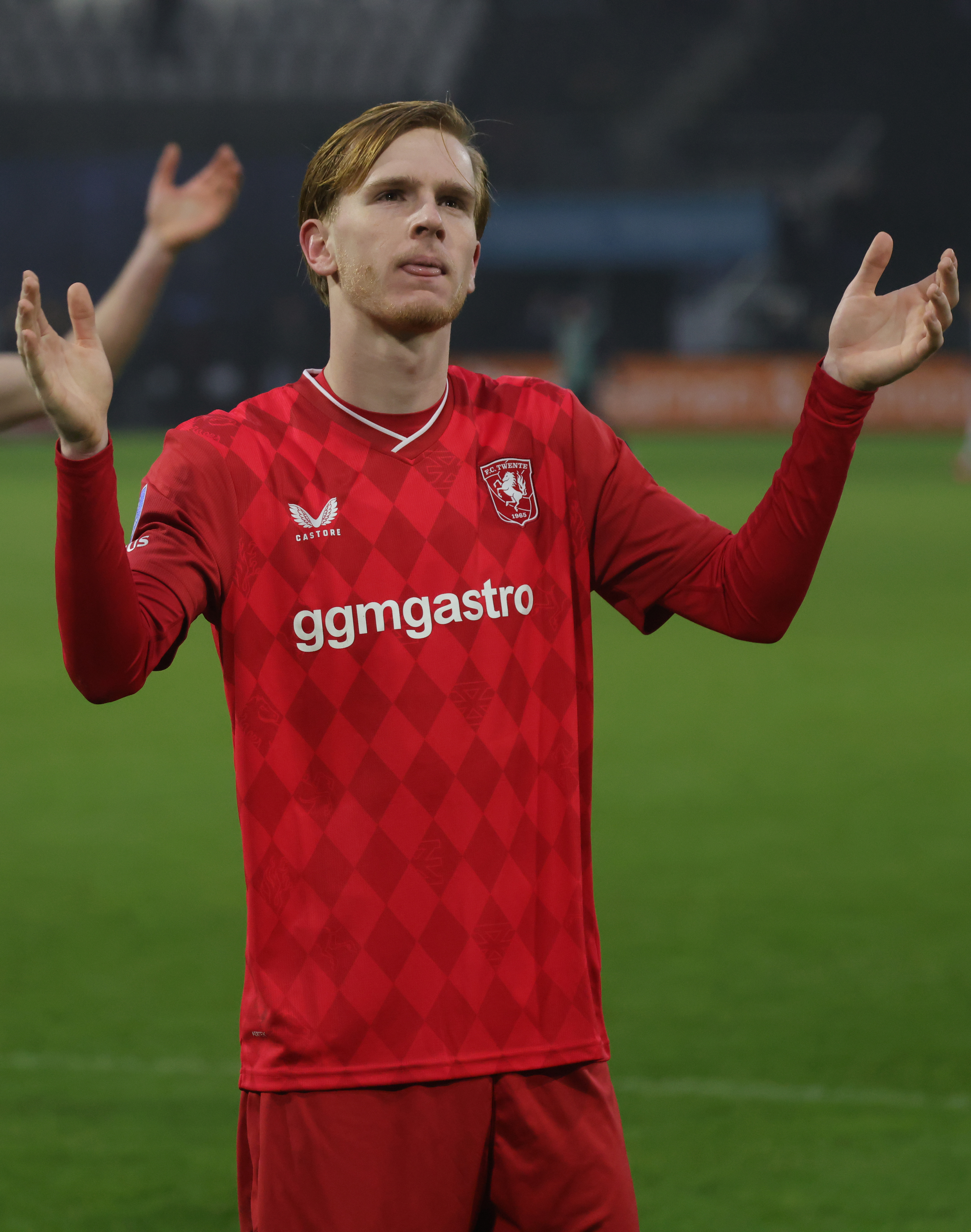
- Rots in 2026 with Twente

Personal information
- Date of birth: 11 March 2006 (age 20)
- Place of birth: Groenlo, Netherlands
- Height: 1.90 m (6 ft 3 in)
- Position: Left-back

Team information
- Current team: TSG Hoffenheim
- Number: 39

Youth career
- 2016–2023: Twente

Senior career*
Years	Team	Apps	(Gls)
2023–2026	Twente	35	(4)
2025	→ Heracles Almelo (loan)	16	(1)
2026–	TSG Hoffenheim	7	(0)

International career^{‡}
2022	Netherlands U16	3	(0)
2022–2023	Netherlands U17	12	(1)
2023–2024	Netherlands U18	1	(0)
2024–2025	Netherlands U19	9	(0)
2025–	Netherlands U21	7	(0)
Medal record
Men's football
Representing Netherlands
UEFA European Under-19 Championship
Winner	2025 Romania
- * Club domestic league appearances and goals as of 31 October 2026 (UTC) ‡ National team caps and goals as of 20:44, 6 October 2026 (UTC)

Mats Rots (born 11 March 2006) is a Dutch professional football player who plays as a left-back for German Bundesliga club TSG Hoffenheim.

== Club career ==
A youth product of Twente, Rots signed his first professional contract with Twente on 1 July 2022 for 3 seasons. He made his senior and professional debut with Twente in a 2–0 UEFA Conference League qualifier win over Riga FC on 10 August 2023. On 20 August 2023, he debuted with Twente in the Eredivisie in a 3–1 win over ADO Den Haag. On 1 October 2024, he extended his contract with Twente until 2027. On 17 January 2025, he was loaned out to Heracles Almelo for the second half of the 2024–25 season.

On 9 June 2026, Hoffenheim agreed to sign Rots for €16 million, a club-record sale for Twente.

== International career ==
Rots was called up to the Netherlands U17s for the 2023 UEFA European Under-17 Championship. He was part of the Netherlands U19s that won the 2025 UEFA European Under-19 Championship.

== Personal life ==
Mats is the younger brother of the Dutch footballer Daan Rots.

== Career statistics ==
As of match played 31 October 2026

Appearances and goals by club, season and competition
Club	Season	League			National cup		Europe		Other		Total	
Club	Season	Division	Apps	Goals	Apps	Goals	Apps	Goals	Apps	Goals	Apps	Goals
Twente	2023–24	Eredivisie	1	0	0	0	3 (Note: Appearances in UEFA Europa Conference League)	0	—		4	0
Twente	2024–25	Eredivisie	0	0	1	0	1 (Note: Appearance in UEFA Champions League)	0	—		2	0
Twente	2025–26	Eredivisie	34	4	3	1	—		—		37	5
Twente	Total		35	4	3	1	4	0	—		43	5
Heracles (loan)	2024–25	Eredivisie	16	1	2	1	—		—		18	2
TSG Hoffenheim	2026–27	Bundesliga	7	0	2	0	2 (Note: Appearances in UEFA Europa League)	0	—		11	0
Career total			58	5	8	2	6	0	0	0	72	7

== Honours ==
Netherlands U19

- UEFA European Under-19 Championship: 2025

Individual

- Eredivisie Talent of the Month: December 2025
