= Robin Pröpper =

Dutch footballer

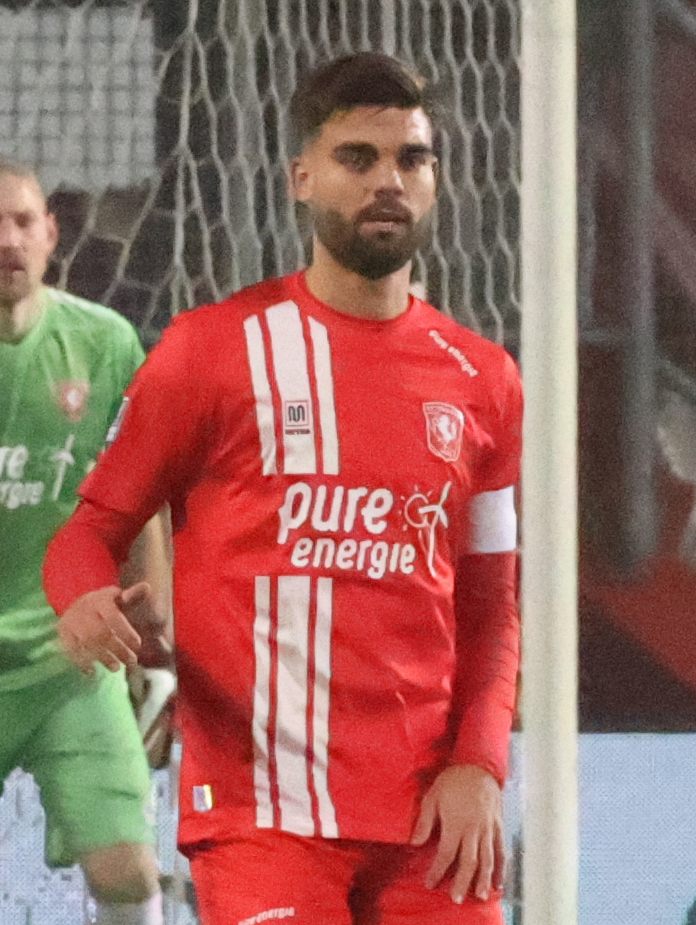
- Pröpper playing for Twente

Personal information
- Date of birth: 23 September 1993 (age 33)
- Place of birth: Arnhem, Netherlands
- Height: 1.90 m (6 ft 3 in)
- Position: Centre-back

Team information
- Current team: Twente
- Number: 3

Youth career
- VDZ
- Vitesse
- De Graafschap

Senior career*
| Years | Team | Apps | (Gls) |
| 2012–2016 | De Graafschap | 112 | (8) |
| 2016–2021 | Heracles Almelo | 97 | (5) |
| 2021–2024 | Twente | 95 | (9) |
| 2024–2025 | Rangers | 24 | (2) |
| 2025– | Twente | 38 | (2) |
- * Club domestic league appearances and goals as of 25 October 2026

Robin Pröpper (born 23 September 1993) is a Dutch professional footballer who plays as a centre-back for Eredivisie club Twente. He formerly played for Rangers, De Graafschap and Heracles Almelo in his homeland.

== Youth career ==
Pröpper began playing football with local club VDZ Arnhem, an amateur partner club of Vitesse, before joining Vitesse's youth system. He later moved to the academy of De Graafschap, where he progressed through the youth ranks and was promoted to the senior squad ahead of the 2012–13 season.

== Career ==
=== De Graafschap ===
Pröpper made his senior debut on 17 August 2012, coming on as an 88th‑minute substitute in an Eerste Divisie match against Go Ahead Eagles. He made his first start the following week against Helmond Sport, scoring his first goal and providing his first assist to give De Graafschap a 1–0 lead, though the team would ultimately lose 5–2. He established himself as a regular starter during the 2012–13 season and later captained the side for the first time during the 2015–16 campaign. Over the course of four seasons, he made 131 appearances and scored nine goals in all competitions. Pröpper was part of the squad that won promotion to the Eredivisie via the 2015 play‑offs, and he made his top‑flight debut on 11 August 2015. During the 2015–16 season, he played against his older brother, Davy Pröpper, for the first time in his professional career. De Graafschap finished seventeenth and entered the relegation play-offs, losing the final to Go Ahead Eagles. He left the club at the end of the 2015–16 season following their relegation.

=== Heracles Almelo ===
Pröpper joined Heracles Almelo ahead of the 2016–17 season. Heracles had finished sixth in the Eredivisie the previous year and qualified for the Europa League play-offs, earning a place in the 2016–17 qualifying rounds. Pröpper made his competitive debut for Heracles in a 1–1 draw with Arouca on 28 July 2016.

He started the season as third choice behind central defenders Mike te Wierik and Justin Hoogma. In the seventh round of play against FC Groningen, Pröpper made his debut in the Eredivisie on behalf of Heracles Almelo, because Te Wierik had moved to right back. That season, he played 22 games in all competitions. The following season he is unanimously a starting player and only misses a number of games due to injuries. He scored four goals that season, his most productive season up to that point.

Pröpper has been unanimously chosen as captain of Heracles, August 2018 In his third season, he was appointed captain of Heracles Almelo after the departure of goalkeeper Bram Castro. He played five games as captain that season until he was out on 16 September 2018 against SC Heerenveen with a hamstring injury. He will therefore miss the rest of the season. On 11 August 2019, after almost a year of injury against Fortuna Sittard, he returns to the starting line-up at Heracles. He plays 18 games in the season that was previously interrupted by corona. In his fifth season, Pröpper missed only four league games. At the end of that season, his contract with Heracles expires. He came to 103 games for the Almelo team in five years, in which he scored five times.

=== FC Twente ===
Pröpper signed a three-year contract with FC Twente, the rival of his previous club Heracles, on 1 July 2021. Due to the absence of regular captain Wout Brama, he started the season as captain in the first match on 14 August against Fortuna Sittard. After five rounds of play, he was the club's top scorer, with two goals against SBV Vitesse and goals against AFC Ajax and FC Utrecht. He would eventually score one more time that season, on 6 March 2022, against SC Cambuur, and thus achieved his most goal-rich season ever. He finished fourth that year with FC Twente, which meant participation in the qualification for the UEFA Europa Conference League. In his second season, he played 39 games in all competitions, scoring three times and providing two assists.

In his third season at FC Twente, he was appointed first captain due to the retirement of Wout Brama. In the season opener against Almere City FC on 13 August 2023 (4–1), he scored the first Eredivisie goal of the new season. In January 2024, he extended his expiring contract until mid-2027.

=== Rangers ===
On 1 August 2024, Pröpper signed with Rangers in Scotland. On 10 August 2024, Pröpper made his debut for the club, scoring an own-goal in a 2–1 win over Motherwell. On 2 January 2025, Pröpper scored his first goal for the club in a 3–0 win over rivals Celtic.

=== Return to FC Twente ===
On 26 July 2025, Pröpper left Rangers to rejoin former club FC Twente.

== Personal life ==
He is the younger brother of former footballer Davy Pröpper.

== Career statistics ==
As of match played 25 October 2026

Appearances and goals by club, season and competition
| Club | Season | League | | | National cup (Note: Includes KNVB Cup) | | League cup (Note: Includes Scottish League Cup) | | Continental | | Other | | Total | |
| Club | Season | Division | Apps | Goals | Apps | Goals | Apps | Goals | Apps | Goals | Apps | Goals | Apps | Goals |
|---|---|---|---|---|---|---|---|---|---|---|---|---|---|---|
| De Graafschap | 2012–13 | Eerste Divisie | 21 | 2 | 1 | 0 | – | | – | | 3 (Note: Appearances in Eerste Divisie promotion play-offs) | 0 | 25 | 2 |
| De Graafschap | 2013–14 | Eerste Divisie | 24 | 2 | 0 | 0 | – | | – | | 2 | 0 | 26 | 2 |
| De Graafschap | 2014–15 | Eerste Divisie | 36 | 2 | 3 | 1 | – | | – | | 6 | 0 | 45 | 3 |
| De Graafschap | 2015–16 | Eredivisie | 31 | 2 | 1 | 0 | – | | – | | 4 (Note: Appearances in Eredivisie relegation play-offs) | 0 | 36 | 2 |
| De Graafschap | Total | | 112 | 8 | 5 | 1 | – | | – | | 15 | 0 | 132 | 9 |
| Heracles Almelo | 2016–17 | Eredivisie | 18 | 0 | 2 | 0 | – | | 2 (Note: Appearances in UEFA Europa League) | 0 | – | | 22 | 0 |
| Heracles Almelo | 2017–18 | Eredivisie | 26 | 4 | 1 | 0 | – | | – | | – | | 27 | 4 |
| Heracles Almelo | 2018–19 | Eredivisie | 5 | 0 | 0 | 0 | – | | – | | – | | 5 | 0 |
| Heracles Almelo | 2019–20 | Eredivisie | 18 | 0 | – | | – | | – | | – | | 18 | 0 |
| Heracles Almelo | 2020–21 | Eredivisie | 30 | 1 | 1 | 0 | – | | – | | – | | 31 | 1 |
| Heracles Almelo | Total | | 97 | 5 | 4 | 0 | – | | 2 | 0 | – | | 103 | 5 |
| FC Twente | 2021–22 | Eredivisie | 33 | 5 | 3 | 0 | – | | – | | – | | 36 | 5 |
| FC Twente | 2022–23 | Eredivisie | 29 | 1 | 2 | 0 | – | | 4 (Note: Appearances in UEFA Europa Conference League) | 1 | 4 (Note: Appearances in Eredivisie European competition play-offs) | 1 | 39 | 3 |
| FC Twente | 2023–24 | Eredivisie | 33 | 3 | 1 | 0 | – | | 6 | 0 | – | | 40 | 3 |
| FC Twente | Total | | 95 | 9 | 6 | 0 | – | | 10 | 1 | 4 | 1 | 115 | 11 |
| Rangers | 2024–25 | Scottish Premiership | 24 | 2 | 2 | 0 | 3 | 0 | 10 (Note: 1 appearance in UEFA Champions League and 9 appearances in UEFA Europa League) | 0 | – | | 39 | 2 |
| Twente | 2025–26 | Eredivisie | 28 | 0 | 3 | 0 | — | | — | | — | | 31 | 0 |
| Twente | 2026–27 | Eredivisie | 10 | 2 | 0 | 0 | — | | 6 | 1 | — | | 16 | 3 |
| Twente | Total | | 38 | 2 | 3 | 0 | — | | 6 | 1 | — | | 47 | 3 |
| Career total | | | 366 | 25 | 20 | 1 | 3 | 0 | 28 | 2 | 19 | 1 | 436 | 30 |

== Honours ==
Individual

- Eredivisie Team of the Month: March 2022
