= Ángel Alarcón =

Spanish footballer (born 2004)

Personal information
- Full name: Ángel Alarcón Galiot
- Date of birth: 15 May 2004 (age 22)
- Place of birth: Castelldefels, Spain
- Height: 1.81 m (5 ft 11 in)
- Position: Winger

Team information
- Current team: Utrecht
- Number: 11

Youth career
- Vista Alegre
- 2012–2018: Espanyol
- 2018–2023: Barcelona

Senior career*
Years	Team	Apps	(Gls)
2021–2024	Barcelona B	15	(2)
2023–2024	Barcelona	4	(0)
2024–2026	Porto B	28	(7)
2025–2026	Porto	3	(0)
2026	→ Utrecht (loan)	13	(3)
2026–	Utrecht	8	(3)

International career
2018–2020	Spain U15	3	(1)
2019–2020	Spain U16	9	(5)
2023	Spain U19	7	(3)
2022	Spain U20	2	(0)
- * Club domestic league appearances and goals as of 22:00, 18 October 2026 (UTC)

Ángel Alarcón Galiot (born 15 May 2004) is a Spanish professional footballer who plays as a winger for Eredivisie club Utrecht.

== Club career ==
Born in Castelldefels, Barcelona, Catalonia, Alarcón started his footballing career at the age of four with amateur side Vista Alegre, where both of his parents played. He joined Barcelona in 2018 from Espanyol, going on to make his debut for the Barcelona Atlètic side in 2021. A ruptured ACL during the semi-final of the Copa de Campeones Juvenil de Fútbol saw him miss the entirety of the 2021–22 season.

On 18 January 2023, having scored twelve goals for the club's Juvenil A team, he was named in the Barcelona senior squad for the Copa del Rey game against Ceuta the following day. He made his professional debut as Barcelona went on to beat Ceuta 5–0, coming on as a substitute for Raphinha. Since then, Alarcon played four more times for the Barcelona senior side and had been a reasonably consistent presence in Xavi’s matchday squad selections.

On 29 August 2024, Alarcón signed with Portuguese club Porto and was assigned to the reserves squad Porto B in Liga Portugal 2.

On 26 January 2026, Porto sent Alarcón on loan to Eredivisie club Utrecht until the end of the 2025–26 season, with an optional buy-clause of €2 million. Four months later, after scoring 3 goals in 13 Eredivisie appearances, the clause was triggered and he joined the Dutch side on a three-year contract.

== International career ==
Alarcón has represented Spain at youth international level.

== Style of play ==
A forward using both feet and able to play anywhere across the front line, Alarcón is known for his pace and goal-scoring ability.

== Career statistics ==
=== Club ===
As of match played 18 October 2026

Appearances and goals by club, season and competition
Club	Season	League			National cup (Note: Includes Copa del Rey)		League cup (Note: Includes Taça da Liga)		Europe		Other		Total	
Club	Season	Division	Apps	Goals	Apps	Goals	Apps	Goals	Apps	Goals	Apps	Goals	Apps	Goals
Barcelona B	2020–21	Segunda División B	4	0	—		—		—		—		4	0
Barcelona B	2021–22	Primera División RFEF	0	0	—		—		—		—		0	0
Barcelona B	2022–23	Primera Federación	2	0	—		—		—		—		2	0
Barcelona B	2023–24	Primera Federación	9	2	—		—		—		3 (Note: Appearances in Primera Federación play-offs)	0	12	1
Barcelona B	Total		15	2	—		—		—		3	0	18	2
Barcelona	2022–23	La Liga	4	0	1	0	—		0	0	0	0	5	0
Porto B	2024–25	Liga Portugal 2	19	7	—		—		—		—		19	7
Porto B	2025–26	Liga Portugal 2	9	0	—		—		—		—		9	0
Porto B	Total		28	7	—		—		—		—		28	7
Porto	2025–26	Primeira Liga	3	0	0	0	1	0	2 (Note: Appearances in UEFA Europa League)	0	—		6	0
Utrecht (loan)	2025–26	Eredivisie	13	3	0	0	—		0	0	1 (Note: Appearance in Eredivisie European competition play-offs)	0	14	3
Utrecht	2026–27	Eredivisie	8	3	0	0	—		—		—		8	3
Career total			71	15	1	0	1	0	2	0	4	0	79	15

== Honours ==
Barcelona

- La Liga: 2022–23

FC Porto

- Primeira Liga: 2025–26
