= Harrie Kuster =

Dutch footballer (born 2005)

- Kuster with Telstar in 2026

Personal information
- Date of birth: 11 September 2005 (age 21)
- Place of birth: Zwolle, Netherlands
- Position: Midfielder

Team information
- Current team: Telstar
- Number: 14

Youth career
- 2011–2021: WVF
- 2021–2024: Twente

Senior career*
Years	Team	Apps	(Gls)
2024–2026	Twente	2	(0)
2025–2026	→ RKC Waalwijk (loan)	34	(10)
2026–	Telstar	9	(1)
- * Club domestic league appearances and goals as of 11:54, 14 November 2026 (UTC)

Harrie Kuster (born 11 September 2005) is a Dutch professional footballer who plays as a midfielder for Eredivisie club Telstar.

Born in Zwolle, Kuster joined the FC Twente academy from local amateur club WVF in 2021. He made two brief substitute appearances for Twente's first team, before spending a season on loan at RKC Waalwijk in the Eerste Divisie where he won a regular place and helped the club reach the promotion play-offs. He joined Eredivisie side Telstar on a permanent deal in August 2026.

== Early life ==
Kuster was born in Zwolle on 11 September 2005. He began playing football as a young boy at age six at the local amateur club WVF. His home-town club, PEC Zwolle, did not consider him good enough for their academy. In 2021, aged 15, he joined the joint academy of FC Twente and Heracles after a short trial. He started out in the under-18 side.

== Club career ==
=== Twente ===
Kuster progressed quickly through the academy. Towards the end of his second season there, he began training with the first team. In January 2024, he travelled with the senior squad to their winter training camp in Spain. On 23 May 2024, he signed his first professional contract, running until mid-2026. Technical director Arnold Bruggink said Kuster had earned the deal "entirely on his own".

Five months later, on 27 October 2024, Kuster made his first-team debut. He replaced Sem Steijn in the 84th minute of a 5–0 home win over Heracles Almelo. The crowd sang his name as soon as he came on. Supporters then chanted "Alle ballen op Harrie", Dutch for "every ball to Harrie", with each of his touches. Despite playing only the closing minutes, he was named man of the match. Asked afterwards about the reception, he suggested it was probably down to his unusual name. The debut was one of only two short substitute appearances he made for Twente.

==== RKC Waalwijk (loan) ====
Kuster playing for RKC Waalwijk in 2025

On 30 June 2025, Kuster extended his contract with Twente until mid-2027. On the same day he joined Eerste Divisie club RKC Waalwijk on a season-long loan, with no option to buy. In Waalwijk he was reunited with head coach Sander Duits, who knew him from his time as an assistant coach at Twente.

The loan began poorly. Kuster lost his place early in the season and later admitted that he had perhaps expected games to come too easily at RKC. He won back a starting role towards the end of 2025 and kept it for the rest of the campaign. Duits first used him in central midfield, then moved him further forward as an attacking midfielder or striker. Kuster later credited the striker Michiel Kramer with acting as a mentor to him at the club.

The move forward paid off in the spring of 2026. Mostly in March and April, Kuster scored in seven consecutive matches, a run in which RKC lost only once. The seventh goal came in a 5–0 home win over FC Emmen on 10 April. "Scoring every week, that's what I do," he said after the match. A week later, he was named Talent of the Period for the fourth period of the Eerste Divisie season. The streak ended against ADO Den Haag. He finished the 2025–26 season with ten league goals.

RKC reached the promotion play-offs and beat Roda JC on penalties in the first round. Their run ended in the next round against Willem II. In the final seconds of the second leg, Kuster missed a chance that would have forced extra time. He returned to Twente at the end of the season, saying he was coming back "a better and more mature player".

=== Telstar ===
Kuster's return to Twente was brief. On 4 August 2026, he joined Eredivisie club Telstar on a three-year contract, with an option for a further season. Technical manager Peter Hofstede described him as a talented young player signed with the longer term in mind.

== Style of play ==
Kuster played as a controlling midfielder in youth football. He has described his best position as a mix between a number eight and a number ten. RKC Waalwijk manager Sander Duits called him a natural footballer whose game was built on technique and insight. He said Kuster had made huge strides in defending, transitions and tempo during his loan.

== Career statistics ==
As of match played 7 November 2026

Appearances and goals by club, season and competition
Club	Season	League			KNVB Cup		Europe		Other		Total	
Club	Season	Division	Apps	Goals	Apps	Goals	Apps	Goals	Apps	Goals	Apps	Goals
Twente	2024–25	Eredivisie	2	0	0	0	0	0	0	0	2	0
RKC Waalwijk (loan)	2025–26	Eerste Divisie	34	10	3	0	—		4 (Note: Appearances in Eerste Divisie play-offs)	0	41	10
Telstar	2026–27	Eredivisie	6	0	1	0	—		—		7	0
Career total			42	10	4	0	0	0	4	0	50	10
