= 2011–12 Taça da Liga =

Tournament details
- Host country: Portugal
- Dates: 31 July 2011 – 14 April 2012
- Teams: 32

Final positions
- Champions: Benfica (4th title)
- Runners-up: Gil Vicente

Tournament statistics
- Matches played: 67
- Goals scored: 160 (2.39 per match)
- Top scorers: Miguel Rosa; Baba Diawara; Rodrigo; (4 goals each)

The 2011–12 Taça da Liga was the fifth edition of the Portuguese Taça da Liga. The first matches were played on 31 July 2011. The final was played on 14 April 2012, with Benfica defeating Gil Vicente 2–1 to win their fourth consecutive Taça da Liga.

== Format ==
This seasons' format consists of 3 rounds, plus knockout stages. In the first round, only second division teams play. All 16 teams are allocated into 4 groups of 4 teams each. Each team plays 3 matches and top two of each group advances. In the second round, teams that qualified from previous round are joined by the two Liga Sagres promoted teams and also the 6 worst in the top league in the previous season. There will be two-legged fixtures in which the winners will advance. The third round is where the remaining top 8 teams from previous season first division enter the competition. Again, as in the first round, the 16 teams are divided into 4 groups and each team will play 3 matches. However this time, only group winners advance. Both semi-finals and finals are one-legged fixtures.

== Participating clubs ==
- Clubs starting from the first round: Arouca, Atlético CP, Belenenses, Covilhã, Desportivo das Aves, Estoril, Freamunde, Leixões, Moreirense, Naval, Oliveirense, Penafiel, Portimonense, Santa Clara, Trofense, União da Madeira
- Clubs starting from the second round: Académica, Beira-Mar, Feirense, Gil Vicente, Marítimo, Olhanense, União de Leiria, Vitória de Setúbal
- Clubs starting from the third round: Benfica, Braga, Nacional, Paços de Ferreira, Porto, Rio Ave, Sporting CP, Vitória de Guimarães

== First round ==
=== Group A ===
Pos	Team	Pld	W	D	L	GF	GA	GD	Pts	Qualification	BEL	PEN	TRO	LEI
1	Belenenses	3	2	1	0	8	4	+4	7	Advance to second round			3–1	5–3
2	Penafiel	3	0	3	0	2	2	0	3	Advance to second round	0–0			
3	Trofense	3	0	2	1	3	5	−2	2			1–1		1–1
4	Leixões	3	0	2	1	5	7	−2	2			1–1		

=== Group B ===
Pos	Team	Pld	W	D	L	GF	GA	GD	Pts	Qualification	SCA	NAV	SCO	ARO
1	Santa Clara	3	2	1	0	3	1	+2	7	Advance to second round		1–0		1–1
2	Naval	3	2	0	1	4	2	+2	6	Advance to second round			2–1	2–0
3	Sporting da Covilhã	3	1	0	2	2	3	−1	3		0–1			
4	Arouca	3	0	1	2	1	4	−3	1				0–1	

=== Group C ===
Pos	Team	Pld	W	D	L	GF	GA	GD	Pts	Qualification	MOR	PRM	FRM	ATL
1	Moreirense	3	2	1	0	6	4	+2	7	Advance to second round				2–1
2	Portimonense	3	1	1	1	6	6	0	4	Advance to second round	2–3			1–1
3	Freamunde	3	1	1	1	4	4	0	4		1–1	2–3		
4	Atlético CP	3	0	1	2	2	4	−2	1				0–1	

=== Group D ===
Pos	Team	Pld	W	D	L	GF	GA	GD	Pts	Qualification	EST	UDM	AVE	OLI
1	Estoril	3	2	0	1	5	3	+2	6	Advance to second round			2–0	1–0
2	União da Madeira	3	1	1	1	4	4	0	4	Advance to second round	3–2			
3	Desportivo das Aves	3	1	1	1	1	2	−1	4			0–0		
4	Oliveirense	3	1	0	2	2	3	−1	3			2–1	0–1	

== Second round ==
The 2011–12 Taça da Liga Second Round matches were played on 8, 9, 26 and 27 October 2011 for the first legs whilst the second legs took place on 9, 12 and 13 November 2011. The winners over the two legs progressed to the third round.

Team 1	Agg.	Team 2	1st leg	2nd leg
União da Madeira	2–5	Marítimo	2–3	0–2
Penafiel	2–1	Académica	1–1	1–0
Santa Clara	3–2	União de Leiria	3–1	0–1
Naval	3–4	Vitória de Setúbal	1–2	2–2
Moreirense	4–3	Beira-Mar	2–2	2–1
Portimonense	2–2 (5–4 p)	Feirense	1–0	1–2
Estoril	4–3	Olhanense	4–3	0–0
Belenenses	2–3	Gil Vicente	2–1	0–2

=== First leg ===
8 October 2011
16:00

União da Madeira	2–3	Marítimo
Marreco 28', 61'	Report	Pouga 21'; Marquinho 22'; Diawara 84'

Campo do Adelino Rodrigues, Funchal, Portugal
Attendance: 1,112
Referee: Rui Costa

8 October 2011
20:15

Penafiel	1–1	Académica
Elízio 17'	Report	Adrien 90'

Estádio Municipal 25 de Abril, Penafiel, Portugal
Attendance: 973
Referee: Carlos Xistra

9 October 2011
16:00

Santa Clara	3–1	União de Leiria
Platini 3'; Alex 20'; Simões 94'	Report	Élvis 64'

Estádio de São Miguel, Ponta Delgada, Portugal
Attendance: 489
Referee: Vasco Santos

26 October 2011
16:00

Naval	1–2	Vitória de Setúbal
Simplício 86'	Report	Amaro 34'; Gonçalves 67'

Estádio Municipal José Bento Pessoa, Figueira da Foz, Portugal
Attendance: 153
Referee: André Gralha

26 October 2011
16:00

Moreirense	2–2	Beira-Mar
Pintassilgo 48'; Wágner 74'	Report	Douglas 8'; Élio 13'

Parque de Jogos Comendador Joaquim de Almeida Freitas, Moreira de Cónegos, Portugal
Attendance: 466
Referee: Jorge Sousa

26 October 2011
16:00

Portimonense	1–0	Feirense
Felipe 71'	Report

Estádio Municipal de Portimão, Portimão, Portugal
Attendance: 438
Referee: Marco Ferreira

26 October 2011
19:00

Estoril	4–3	Olhanense
Moreno 24', Vitória 37', 65'; Carlos Eduardo 85'	Report	Toy 31'; Ivanildo 32'; Djalmir 51'

Estádio António Coimbra da Mota, Estoril, Portugal
Attendance: 251
Referee: Bruno Esteves

27 October 2011
16:00

Belenenses	2–1	Gil Vicente
Rodrigo António 5'; Victor Bolt 88'	Report	Guilherme 16'

Estádio do Restelo, Belém, Portugal
Attendance: 629
Referee: Duarte Gomes

=== Second leg ===
9 November 2011
16:00

Vitória de Setúbal	2–2	Naval
J. Silva 57'; R. Silva 77'	Report	Carlitos 20'; João Pedro 39'

Estádio do Bonfim, Setúbal, Portugal
Attendance: 577
Referee: João Capela

Vitória de Setúbal won 4-3 on aggregate.

9 November 2011
16:00

Feirense	2–1	Portimonense
Buval 20'; Eliézio 41' (pen.)	Report	Pessoa 33'
Penalties
	4–5

Estádio Municipal de Aveiro, Aveiro, Portugal
Attendance: 68
Referee: Hugo Miguel

Feirense 2-2 Portimonense on aggregate. Portimonense won 5-4 on penalties.

9 November 2011
19:00

Olhanense	0–0	Estoril
	Report

Estádio José Arcanjo, Olhão, Portugal
Attendance: 440
Referee: João Ferreira

Estoril won 4-3 on aggregate.

12 November 2011
16:00

Beira-Mar	1–2	Moreirense
Douglas 49'	Report	Pintassilgo 76'; Wágner 90'

Estádio Municipal de Aveiro, Aveiro, Portugal
Attendance: 683
Referee: Vasco Santos

Moreirense won 4-3 on aggregate.

12 November 2011
16:00

Marítimo	2–0	União da Madeira
João Guilherme 79'; Diawara 87'	Report

Estádio dos Barreiros, Funchal, Portugal
Attendance: 1,832
Referee: Bruno Esteves

Marítimo won 5-2 on aggregate.

12 November 2011
20:15

Gil Vicente	2–0	Belenenses
Cláudio 51'; Luís Carlos 57'	Report

Estádio Cidade de Barcelos, Barcelos, Portugal
Attendance: 3,964
Referee: Rui Costa

Gil Vicenre won 3-2 on aggregate.

13 November 2011
16:00

União de Leiria	1–0	Santa Clara
Moraes 53' (pen.)	Report

Municipal da Marinha Grande, Marinha Grande, Portugal
Attendance: 473
Referee: Cosme Cunha Machado

Santa Clara won 3-2 on aggregate.

13 November 2011
19:15

Académica	0–1	Penafiel
	Report	Manoel 46'

Estádio Cidade de Coimbra, Coimbra, Portugal
Attendance: 524
Referee: Paulo Baptista

Penafiel won 2-1 on aggregate.

== Third round ==
The 2011–12 Taça da Liga Third Round group stage matches are to be played in January and February 2012. The eight winners of the two legged Second Round matches progressed to this round and are joined by the teams who finished in the top eight of the 2010–11 Primeira Liga. The sixteen teams will be seeded depending on their league position from the previous season. The sixteen teams involved in this round would be split into four groups from group A to D. The first round matches of the group stage took place on 21 December 2011 and 2–3 January 2012, the second-round games took place on 18 January and the third round matches took place on 2–3 February 2012. The winners of each group would progress to the semi-final stage to be played on the 21 March 2012.

=== Participating teams ===
Names in bold are the colloquial names of the clubs. Estoril, Gil Vicente, Marítimo, Moreirense, Penafiel, Portimonense, Santa Clara, Vitória de Setúbal all progressed from the second round to this phase. Benfica, Nacional, Paços de Ferreira, Porto, Rio Ave, Sporting CP, Braga and Vitória de Guimarães started their campaign at this stage.

- Sport Lisboa e **Benfica**
- Grupo Desportivo **Estoril-Praia**
- **Gil Vicente** Futebol Clube
- Club Sport **Marítimo**
- **Moreirense** Futebol Clube
- Clube Desportivo **Nacional** "**da Madeira**"
- Futebol Clube **Paços de Ferreira**
- Futebol Clube de **Penafiel**
- **Portimonense** Sporting Clube
- Futebol Clube do **Porto**
- **Rio Ave** Futebol Clube
- Clube Desportivo **Santa Clara**
- **Sporting** Clube de Portugal
- Sporting Clube de **Braga**
- **Vitória** Sport Clube "**de Guimarães**"
- **Vitória** Futebol Clube "**de Setúbal**"

=== Draw ===
The draw for the third round took place on 23 November 2012 at 12:00 at the LPFP headquarters in Lisbon, Portugal. The teams involved in this round were seeded according to their league position from either the 2010–11 Primeira Liga or the 2010–11 Liga de Honra depending in which division they played in last season.

Pot 1	Pot 2	Pot 3	Pot 4
Porto; Benfica; Sporting CP; Braga	Vitória de Guimarães; Nacional; Paços de Ferreira; Rio Ave	Marítimo; Vitória de Setúbal; Portimonense; Gil Vicente	Moreirense; Santa Clara; Estoril; Penafiel

=== Groups ===
==== Group A ====
Pos	Team	Pld	W	D	L	GF	GA	GD	Pts	Qualification
1	Gil Vicente	3	2	1	0	4	2	+2	**7**	Advance to knockout phase
2	Moreirense	3	1	1	1	3	3	0	**4**	
3	Sporting CP	3	0	2	1	2	3	−1	**2**	
4	Rio Ave	3	0	2	1	2	3	−1	**2**	

2 January 2012
16:00

Gil Vicente	2–1	Moreirense
Luís Carlos 48', 77'	Report	Pintassilgo 54'

Estádio Cidade de Barcelos, Barcelos, Portugal
Attendance: 1,383
Referee: Artur Soares Dias

2 January 2012
20:45

Rio Ave	1–1	Sporting CP
Tomás 16'	Report	Onyewu 87'

Estádio do Rio Ave FC, Vila do Conde, Portugal
Attendance: 3,188
Referee: Cosme Machado

18 January 2012
16:00

Rio Ave	1–1	Gil Vicente
Tomás 60' (pen.)	Report	Yero 70'

Estádio do Rio Ave FC, Vila do Conde, Portugal
Attendance: 947
Referee: Duarte Gomes

19 January 2012
20:15

Sporting CP	1–1	Moreirense
Capel 28'	Report	Ghilas 34'

Estádio José Alvalade, Lisbon, Portugal
Attendance: 17,440
Referee: Marco Ferreira

4 February 2012
20:30

Sporting CP	0–1	Gil Vicente
	Report	Cláudio 54' (pen.)

Estádio José Alvalade, Lisbon, Portugal
Attendance: 23,801
Referee: Bruno Esteves

4 February 2012
20:30

Moreirense	1–0	Rio Ave
Pinto 79'	Report

Parque de Jogos Comendador Joaquim de Almeida Freitas, Moreira de Cónegos, Portugal
Attendance: 372
Referee: Hugo Pacheco

==== Group B ====
Pos	Team	Pld	W	D	L	GF	GA	GD	Pts	Qualification
1	Benfica	3	3	0	0	9	1	+8	**9**	Advance to knockout phase
2	Marítimo	3	2	0	1	4	3	+1	**6**	
3	Santa Clara	3	1	0	2	1	4	−3	**3**	
4	Vitória de Guimarães	3	0	0	3	1	7	−6	**0**	

2 January 2012
19:00

Marítimo	2–0	Santa Clara
Diawara 5', 28' (pen.)	Report

Estádio dos Barreiros, Madeira, Portugal
Attendance: 1,242
Referee: Jorge Ferreira

3 January 2012
20:45

Vitória de Guimarães	1–4	Benfica
João Paulo 48'	Report	Witsel 11'; Cardozo 65', 83'; Rodrigo 88'

Estádio D. Afonso Henriques, Guimarães, Portugal
Attendance: 7,237
Referee: Bruno Paixão

18 January 2012
18:15

Vitória de Guimarães	0–2	Marítimo
	Report	Tchô 76'; Danilo 87'

Estádio D. Afonso Henriques, Guimarães, Portugal
Attendance: 703
Referee: Jorge Sousa

18 January 2012
20:15

Benfica	2–0	Santa Clara
Oliveira 68'; Witsel 75'	Report

Estádio da Luz, Lisbon, Portugal
Attendance: 14,453
Referee: Rui Silva

4 February 2012
17:00

Santa Clara	1–0	Vitória de Guimarães
Moreira 62' (pen.)	Report

Estádio de São Miguel, Ponta Delgada, Portugal
Attendance: 809
Referee: Cosme Machado

5 February 2012
20:30

Benfica	3–0	Marítimo
Oliveira 13'; Rodrigo 72', 80'	Report

Estádio da Luz, Lisbon, Portugal
Attendance: 19,594
Referee: Artur Soares Dias

==== Group C ====
Pos	Team	Pld	W	D	L	GF	GA	GD	Pts	Qualification
1	Braga	3	3	0	0	5	1	+4	**9**	Advance to knockout phase
2	Nacional	3	1	1	1	3	3	0	**4**	
3	Penafiel	3	1	0	2	2	4	−2	**3**	
4	Portimonense	3	0	1	2	0	2	−2	**1**	

3 January 2012
17:00

Portimonense	0–1	Penafiel
	Report	Coronas 52'

Estádio Municipal de Portimão, Portimão, Portugal
Attendance: 633
Referee: João Capela

3 January 2012
19:15

Nacional	1–2	Braga
Candeias 65'	Report	Lima 10'; Viana 61'

Estádio da Madeira, Madeira, Portugal
Attendance: 825
Referee: Hugo Miguel

18 January 2012
16:00

Nacional	0–0	Portimonense
	Report

Estádio da Madeira, Madeira, Portugal
Attendance: 225
Referee: Jorge Tavares

18 January 2012
18:00

Braga	2 – 0	Penafiel
Viana 45'; Carlão 55'	Report

Estádio Municipal de Braga, Braga, Portugal
Attendance: 3,624
Referee: Nuno Almeida

4 February 2012
18:30

Braga	1–0	Portimonense
Viana 90+3'	Report

Estádio Municipal de Braga, Braga, Portugal
Attendance: 4,468
Referee: Carlos Xistra

4 February 2012
18:30

Penafiel	1–2	Nacional
Oliveira 36'	Report	Keita 60'; Moreno 78'

Estádio Municipal 25 de Abril, Penafiel, Portugal
Attendance: 410
Referee: Duarte Gomes

==== Group D ====
Pos	Team	Pld	W	D	L	GF	GA	GD	Pts	Qualification
1	Porto	3	3	0	0	5	1	+4	**9**	Advance to knockout phase
2	Paços de Ferreira	3	2	0	1	3	2	+1	**6**	
3	Vitória de Setúbal	3	1	0	2	3	4	−1	**3**	
4	Estoril	3	0	0	3	1	6	−5	**0**	

21 December 2011
21:00

Paços de Ferreira	1–2	Porto
William 16'	Report	C. Rodríguez 2'; Hulk 70' (pen.)

Estádio da Mata Real, Paços de Ferreira, Portugal
Attendance: 3,096
Referee: Rui Costa

2 January 2012
19:00

Vitória de Setúbal	3–1	Estoril
Neca 5'; R. Silva 59'; Lopes 61'	Report	Adilson 57'

Estádio do Bonfim, Setúbal, Portugal
Attendance: 966
Referee: Manuel Mota

18 January 2012
16:00

Paços de Ferreira	1–0	Vitória de Setúbal
Manuel José 8'	Report

Estádio da Mata Real, Paços de Ferreira, Portugal
Attendance: 444
Referee: Paulo Baptista

18 January 2012
20:45

Porto	1–0	Estoril
Varela 65'	Report

Estádio do Dragão, Porto, Portugal
Attendance: 15,819
Referee: André Gralha

5 February 2012
18:30

Porto	2–0	Vitória de Setúbal
González 24'; Janko 67'	Report

Estádio do Dragão, Porto, Portugal
Attendance: 27,303
Referee: Vasco Santos

5 February 2012
18:30

Estoril	0–1	Paços de Ferreira
	Report	Josué 50' (pen.)

Estádio António Coimbra da Mota, Estoril, Portugal
Attendance: 444
Referee: Jorge Tavares

== Knockout phase ==
Semifinals
Gil Vicente	2(4)
Braga	2(2)
Benfica	3
Porto	2

Final
Gil Vicente	1
Benfica	2

=== Semi-finals ===
20 March 2012
20:45

Benfica	3–2	Porto
Pereira 4'; Nolito 43'; Cardozo 77'	Report	González 8'; Mangala 17'

Estádio da Luz, Lisbon
Attendance: 28,553
Referee: Artur Soares Dias

22 March 2012
20:15

Gil Vicente	2–2	Braga
Vieira 16'; Júnior Caiçara 89'	Report	Lima 25'; Barbosa 31'
Penalties
Vilela (penalty scored); Cláudio (penalty scored); Galo (penalty scored); Júnior Caiçara (penalty scored)	4–2	Lima (penalty scored); Custódio (penalty scored); Barbosa (penalty missed); Ukra (penalty missed)

Estádio Cidade de Barcelos, Barcelos
Attendance: 11,138
Referee: Hugo Miguel

=== Final ===
14 April 2012
20:45 GMT

Benfica	2 − 1	Gil Vicente
Rodrigo 30'; Saviola 84'	Report	Zé Luís 78'

Estádio Cidade de Coimbra, Coimbra, Portugal
Attendance: 23,452
Referee: Jorge Sousa

== Statistics ==
=== Top goalscorers ===
As of the 14 April 2012 23:19 (UTC)

Rank	Player	Club	Goals
1	(Portugal) Miguel Rosa	Belenenses	4
1	(Senegal) Baba Diawara	Marítimo	4
1	(Spain) Rodrigo	Benfica	4
4	(Brazil) Wágner	Moreirense	3
4	(Portugal) Ricardo Pessoa	Portimonense	3
4	(Portugal) Pintassilgo	Moreirense	3
4	(Brazil) Luís Carlos	Gil Vicente	3
4	(Portugal) Hugo Viana	Braga	3
4	(Paraguay) Óscar Cardozo	Benfica	3
