= 2012 Taça de Portugal final =

- Event: 2011–12 Taça de Portugal
Académica	Sporting CP
1	0
- Date: May 20, 2012
- Venue: Estádio Nacional, Oeiras
- Man of the Match: Marinho (Académica)
- Referee: Paulo Baptista (Portalegre)
- Attendance: 37,522
- Weather: Sunny; 16 °C (61 °F)

The 2012 Taça de Portugal final was the final match of the 2011–12 Taça de Portugal, the 72nd season of the Taça de Portugal, which is the main Portuguese football knockout competition organised by the Portuguese Football Federation (FPF). The final was played at the Estádio Nacional, Oeiras, on the 20 May 2012. The final was contested between two Primeira Liga teams, Académica and Sporting CP. Académica were appearing in their fifth final, whilst Sporting CP were appearing in their 26th final. In Portugal, the final was televised live in HD on Sport TV and RTP1. En route to the final, both sides progressed through six rounds to reach the final. Matches up to the semi-final were contested on a one-off basis with the exception of the semi-finals which were contested over two-legs, with a match at each team's home ground.

Académica defeated Sporting 1–0. Marinho's fourth-minute goal was enough for Académica to claim their second Taça de Portugal in their history after their first cup triumph came in the inaugural edition of the competition in 1939. As Académica won the cup competition, they went on to play Porto in the 2012 Supertaça Cândido de Oliveira in August 2012. Académica would also guarantee European football were they qualified directly for the group stage of the 2012–13 UEFA Europa League by winning this competition.

== Background ==
Académica were appearing in their fifth Taça de Portugal final. Académica had previously won one Taça de Portugal which was the inaugural cup final in 1939, and had previously lost three cup finals (1951, 1967 and 1969). Sporting CP were appearing in their twenty-sixth Taça de Portugal final. They had previously won the Taça de Portugal fifteen times (1941, 1945, 1946, 1948, 1954, 1963, 1971, 1973, 1974, 1978, 1982, 1995, 2002, 2007 and 2008), and had been beaten in the final ten times (1952, 1955, 1960, 1970, 1972, 1979, 1987, 1994, 1996 and 2000). Prior to this match, Académica de Coimbra and Sporting CP had previously met sixteen times in this competition. Académica de Coimbra had won four times whilst Sporting had won twelve.

In Académica's and Sporting's entire history, both sides had met on 139 occasions, with Sporting winning 97 games, Académica winning 19 and the two drawing 23 times. The last meeting between these two sides in this competition was in the 2006–07 edition of the cup in a quarter-final tie in which Sporting defeated the Coimbra-based side 2–1. This was the first time that each side had met each other in a cup final. The last meeting between these two sides in domestic league action was on the 30 April, three weeks before their meeting at the Jamor. Sporting defeated the briosa 2–1 at the Estádio José Alvalade. Académica's last victory over Sporting was a league game fixture on the 6 February 2010, where the estudantes defeated the Lisbon side 2–1.

== Route to the final ==
=== Académica ===
Round	Opponents	Score
3	Oriental (H)	1–0
4	Porto (H)	3–0
5	Leixões (A)	2–5
QF	Desportivo das Aves (H)	3–2
SF	Oliveirense (H)	1–0
SF	Oliveirense (A)	2–2

As a Primeira Liga team, Académica entered the 2011–12 Taça de Portugal in the third round, where they were drawn against Portuguese Second Division side Oriental at the Estádio Cidade de Coimbra. Académica defeated the lower league side 1–0, with a goal from central defender Markus Berger. The fourth round saw Académica pitted against cup holders Porto in a home tie. After an uneventful first half, the first goal of the game came just after the hour mark through Marinho. As the game drew to a close with Académica in the lead, Porto's manager Vítor Pereira brought on two attacking-minded players in James Rodríguez and Kléber to try to get an equalizer for the visitors. Ten minutes from the end, Hélder Cabral skipped past Porto's Maicon on the left, who then picked out a cross for an unmarked Adrien Silva, who slotted the ball past Rafael Bracalli. Académica scored a third goal at eighty-nine minutes as Éder intercepted the ball in the center of the pitch and threaded the ball to Diogo Valente, who, one-on-one with the goalkeeper, slotted the ball to the 'keeper's left, which gave Académica a 3–0 win over a big three side.

Académica were drawn to play away against Leixões in the fifth round, defeating the club 5–2 over 120 minutes. Académica forced extra-time after Leixões had held the lead for the majority of the second half. Adrien Silva scored a decisive late goal to take the game into extra-time. In extra-time, Adrien Silva, Éder and Fábio Luís scored to grant the Briosa passage into the quarter-finals. The Briosa faced Liga de Honra side Desportivo das Aves in the quarter-finals. The match began with an early goal from Éder, which was cancelled out six minutes later as Jorge Pires equalized for Aves. Académica regained the lead just before the interval through Markus Berger. Central defender Abdoulaye Ba extended their lead in the second half before Amaury Bischoff scored a late consolation in injury time to make the final score 3–2.

For the semi-finals, Académica were drawn against the lowest ranked team still active in the competition, Oliveirense of the Liga de Honra. The semi-finals were played over two legs, with the first leg taking place at the Estádio Cidade de Coimbra. The Estudantes defeated Oliveirense 1–0 in the first leg, after Pape Sow scored an injury time winner to clinch the narrowest of margins for the Briosa going into the second leg. The second leg at the Estádio Carlos Osório saw Oliveirense score first through Paulo Clemente. Their lead would be cancelled out two minutes later as Marinho equalized. On 28 minutes, Adriano would convert from the penalty sport to give Oliveirense the lead again. In the second half, Marinho would score a brace and tie the game. The game ended tied and Académica progressed to the final for the first time since 1969.

=== Sporting CP ===
Round	Opponents	Score
3	Famalicão (A)	0–2
4	Braga (H)	2–0
5	Belenenses (H)	2–0
QF	Marítimo (H)	3–0
SF	Nacional (H)	2–2
SF	Nacional (A)	1–3

As a Primeira Liga team, Sporting entered the Taça de Portugal in the third round. They were drawn against Portuguese Second Division side Famalicão in an away tie. The game which took place at the Estádio Municipal 22 de Junho saw Sporting defeat the second division side comfortably with two goals from Dutch striker Ricky van Wolfswinkel. Fellow Primeira Liga side Braga were Sporting CP's opponents in the fourth round. The match, which took place at the Estádio José Alvalade, saw the lions defeat Braga 2–0. Diego Capel and Emiliano Insúa scored to guarantee Sporting CP passage into the fifth round. For the fifth round, Sporting CP faced Liga de Honra side Belenenses. Just like the previous rounds, Sporting defeated their opponents comfortably with goals from Van Wolfswinkel and Stijn Schaars.

The quarter-finals saw another home tie for the lions as they were drawn against Marítimo. Sporting defeated the Verde-Rubros 3–0. Marítimo started stronger with the first major chance of the game falling to Baba Diawara, where on 22 minutes a Marítimo counterattack saw Diawara one on one with goalkeeper Rui Patrício, where his shot was parried wide. Following Marítimo's strong start, Sporting would dictate possession and create several goal scoring opportunities but would be unable to convert their chances in front of goal. Both sides went in at half time level. Following the break, Sporting took the lead. Diego Capel would be played the ball on the left hand side, who picked out a cross for an on-rushing André Carrillo who would head the ball past goalkeeper Ricardo. On 60 minutes, Sporting were awarded a penalty after Marítimo's Igor Rossi fouled Van Wolfswinkel in the box. Rossi would be red carded, and Van Wolfswinkel would convert from the penalty spot to double Sporting's lead. Emiliano Insúa would score in the 82nd minute to score Sporting's third goal.

Fellow Primeira Liga side Nacional were the opponents in the semi-finals, which were played over two legs. The first leg took place at the Estádio José Alvalade. Nacional would score first, as Venezuelan striker Mario Rondón would score a header from a free kick to beat Rui Patrício. This would be the first time that Sporting would concede in the 2011–12 Taça de Portugal. Nacional would score again before the break, capitalizing from the momentum that the team got from their first goal. Daniel Candeias would capitalize after a Ânderson Polga mistake to double Nacional's lead. Following the break, André Carrillo and Diego Capel would come on for Sporting to provide more attacking threat for the Lisbon side. Sporting would score on 75 minutes through Elias. Sporting would tie the game in injury time after Stijn Schaars' free kick would be drilled across the box, where a slight deflection would take the ball into the net. The second leg would see Sporting defeat the alvinegros 3–1 at the Estádio da Madeira. Fabián Rinaudo would score first in the 12th minute. Sporting's lead would be cancelled out by Diego Barcelos in the second half. Ten minutes later, Ricky van Wolfswinkel would score Sporting's second. João Pereira would score Sporting's third in injury time to seal the win and take the Verde-e-Brancos to the final for the first time in four years.

== Match ==
=== Officials ===
The match officials for the game were confirmed on the 16 May by the Portuguese Football Federation (PFF). Paulo Baptista of Portalegre was named as referee. This was the first time that Baptista had officiated a major final. For the final, Baptista was assisted by José Ramalho of Porto and Hernâni Fernandes of Setúbal, while the fourth official was Tomás Santos of Braga.

=== Team selection ===
Académica went into the cup final with several players missing due to injury. For the final, Académica were missing defender Orlando and midfielders Diogo Gomes and Pape Sow. Orlando had sustained an injury at the beginning of the league season that would keep him out for the entire season. Both Diogo Gomes and Pape Sow missed the game due to sustaining injuries in the build-up to the match. Full back Reiner was an injury doubt going into the game. Initially, Académica's David Simão was ineligible to play in the final due to picking a consecutive amount of yellow cards in domestic league action. His suspension, however, was later overturned, allowing him to play in the final. Pedro Emanuel's squad selection for the final saw him omit Reiner, as he did not recuperate from his injury in order to play in the final; Emanuel's lineup saw him include João Real in the starting eleven to replace Reiner. Académica's loan signings Abdoulaye Ba, Adrien Silva and Edinho.

Unlike their opponents, Sporting CP went into the cup final without any injury worries or doubts. Sporting's influential talisman Marat Izmailov recovered in time for the match after missing the last five domestic league games. Just like Académica's David Simão, Sporting's Daniel Carriço had his suspension overturned in order to play in the cup final. Sporting's starting lineup saw the surprise exclusion of Marat Izmailov, although he was used in the game as a substitute in the second half.

=== Summary ===
The cup final started with an early goal on four minutes. Académica's Marinho scored the early goal to give the briosa the advantage. The goal came about as an unmarked Diogo Valente received the ball on the left hand side and crossed the ball into the box, where the ball fell to Marinho in the six-yard box, who headed the ball past Sporting goalkeeper Rui Patrício. Marinho's header saw him capitalize from Sporting's defensive mistake, as he was picked out unmarked in the box when the cross was delivered.

Following Académica's goal, Sporting began to dictate possession but found it difficult to create goal-scoring opportunities due to Académica's defensive approach. The first half ended with the advantage to estudantes. Following the break, the second half began with Sporting on the back foot following two clear-cut chances by Portuguese striker Edinho, who failed to beat Patrício one-on-one. Following these two chances, Sporting took control of the game which led to the creation of chances on goal. Their best chance of the game fell to Spanish winger Diego Capel, who could not beat Ricardo when the game was approaching its conclusion. Académica were able to close out the game and win their second-ever Taça de Portugal.

=== Details ===
20 May 2012
17:00 UTC+1

Académica	1–0	Sporting CP
Marinho 4'

Estádio Nacional, Oeiras, Portugal
Attendance: 37,522
Referee: Paulo Baptista (Portalegre)

Académica	Sporting CP

GK	12	(Portugal) Ricardo
RB	41	(Portugal) Cédric	(yellow card) 33'
CB	21	(Senegal) Abdoulaye Ba
CB	13	(Portugal) João Real
LB	55	(Portugal) Hélder Cabral
DM	50	(Brazil) Diogo Melo (c)	(yellow card) 23'	(substituted off) 80'
CM	10	(Portugal) Adrien Silva
CM	22	(Portugal) David Simão	(yellow card) 69'	(substituted off) 69'
RW	20	(Portugal) Marinho		(substituted off) 90+1'
LW	23	(Portugal) Diogo Valente
CF	36	(Portugal) Edinho
Substitutes:
GK	1	(France) Romuald Peiser
DF	2	(Portugal) João Dias
DF	4	(Portugal) Flávio Ferreira		(substituted on) 69'
DF	26	(Cape Verde) Nivaldo
MF	18	(Ivory Coast) Magique
MF	19	(Portugal) Rui Miguel		(substituted on) 90+1'
FW	99	(Brazil) Danilo		(substituted on) 80'
Manager:
(Portugal) Pedro Emanuel

GK	1	(Portugal) Rui Patrício
RB	47	(Portugal) João Pereira	(yellow card) 35'
CB	4	(Brazil) Ânderson Polga (c)
CB	5	(United States) Oguchi Onyewu
LB	48	(Argentina) Emiliano Insúa	(yellow card) 45+2'	(substituted off) 69'
DM	8	(Netherlands) Stijn Schaars	(yellow card) 73'
CM	77	(Brazil) Elias	(yellow card) 44'	(substituted off) 46'
CM	14	(Chile) Matías Fernández		(substituted off) 77'
RW	18	(Peru) André Carrillo
LW	11	(Spain) Diego Capel
CF	9	(Netherlands) Ricky van Wolfswinkel
Substitutes:
GK	12	(Brazil) Marcelo Boeck
DF	25	(Portugal) Bruno Pereirinha
DF	3	(Portugal) Daniel Carriço
MF	28	(Portugal) André Martins		(substituted on) 69'
MF	10	(Russia) Marat Izmailov		(substituted on) 46'
FW	17	(Spain) Jeffrén		(substituted on) 77'
FW	33	(Chile) Diego Rubio
Manager:
(Portugal) Ricardo Sá Pinto

2011–12 Taça de Portugal Winners
Académica
2nd title

Match officials

- Assistant referees:
  - José Ramalho
  - Hernâni Fernandes
- Fourth official: Hugo Miguel

Man of the match

- Marinho (Académica)

Match rules

- 90 minutes
- 30 minutes of extra time if necessary
- Penalty shootout if scores still level
- Seven named substitutes
- Maximum of three substitutions

== See also ==
- 2011–12 Sporting CP season
- 2012 Taça da Liga final
