= 2011–12 Taça de Portugal =

Taça de Portugal Millennium

Tournament details
- Country: Portugal
- Teams: 173

Final positions
- Champions: Académica de Coimbra (2nd title)
- Runners-up: Sporting CP

Tournament statistics
- Matches played: 173
- Top goal scorer(s): Ricky van Wolfswinkel (5 goals)

The 2011–12 Taça de Portugal (also known as the 2011–12 Taça de Portugal Millenium) was the 72nd season of the Taça de Portugal (English: Portuguese Cup), the premier Portuguese football knockout competition, organized by the Portuguese Football Federation (FPF). The final was played on 20 May 2012 between Académica de Coimbra, returning to the final for the first time since 1969, and Sporting CP, and was won by Associação Acadêmica de Coimbra. The winners qualified for the group stage of the 2012–13 UEFA Europa League.

Porto were the previous holders, having won the competition for a third consecutive time after beating Vitória de Guimarães 6–2 in the previous season's final. However, Porto was not able to defend the title as they were defeated 3–0 by Académica de Coimbra in the fourth round.

== Calendar ==
Round	Main date	Fixtures	Clubs	New entries this round	Notes
First Round	28 August 2011	60	172 → 112	120	Clubs participating in the Segunda Divisão and Terceira Divisão gain entry.
Second Round	11 September 2011	48	112 → 64	16	Clubs participating in Liga de Honra gain entry.
Third Round	16 October 2011	32	64 → 32	16	Clubs participating in the Primeira Liga gain entry.
Fourth Round	20 November 2011	16	32 → 16	none	
Fifth Round	4 December 2011	8	16 → 8	none	
Quarter-finals	21 December 2011	4	8 → 4	none	
Semi-finals	11 and 12 January & 8 February 2012	2	4 → 2	none	Semi-finals held in 2 legs
Final	20 May 2012	1	2 → 1	none	Taça de Portugal Final at the Estádio Nacional.

== Participating teams ==
=== Primeira Liga ===
(16 Teams)

- Associação Académica de Coimbra – OAF
- Sport Clube Beira-Mar
- Sport Lisboa e Benfica
- Gil Vicente Futebol Clube
- Clube Desportivo Feirense
- Club Sport Marítimo
- Clube Desportivo Nacional "da Madeira"
- Sporting Clube Olhanense
- Futebol Clube Paços de Ferreira
- Futebol Clube do Porto
- Rio Ave Futebol Clube
- Sporting Clube de Portugal
- Sporting Clube de Braga
- União Desportiva de Leiria
- Vitória Sport Clube "de Guimarães"
- Vitória Futebol Clube "de Setúbal"

=== Liga de Honra ===
(16 Teams)

- Futebol Clube de Arouca
- Atlético Clube de Portugal
- Clube de Futebol Os Belenenses
- Clube Desportivo das Aves
- Grupo Desportivo Estoril Praia
- Sport Clube Freamunde
- Leixões Sport Club
- Moreirense Futebol Clube
- Associação Naval 1º de Maio
- União Desportiva Oliveirense
- Futebol Clube de Penafiel
- Portimonense Sporting Clube
- Clube Desportivo Santa Clara
- Sporting Clube da Covilhã
- Clube Desportivo Trofense
- Clube de Futebol União "da Madeira"

=== Portuguese Second Division ===
==== North ====
(16 Teams)

- AD Oliveirense
- Carnacha
- Chaves
- Fafe
- Famalicao
- Lousada
- Macedo Cavaleiros
- Maritimo II
- Mereinense
- Mirandela
- Os Limianos
- Ribeira Brava
- Ribeirao
- Tirsense
- Varzim
- Vizela

==== South ====
(16 Teams)

- 1º Dezembro
- Atletico Reguengos
- Caldas
- Carregado
- Estrela Vendas Novas
- Fatima
- Juventude Evora
- Louletano
- Mafra
- Monsanto
- Moura
- Oriental Lisbon
- Pinhalnovense
- Sertanense
- Torreense
- Tourizense

==== Central ====
- Aliados Lordelo
- Amarante
- Anadia
- Angrense
- Boavista
- Cinfaes
- Coimbroes
- Espinho
- Gondomar
- Madalena
- Oliveira Bairro
- Operario
- Padroense
- Parades
- Sao Joao Ver
- Tondela

== Third round ==
In this round entered teams from Liga ZON Sagres (1st level) and the winners from the second round. The matches were played on the 14th, 15th and 16 October 2011.

Home team	Score	Away team
Portimonense (LH)	0–2	Benfica (PL)
Pêro Pinheiro (III)	0–8	Porto (PL)
1º de Dezembro (II)	1–3	Braga (PL)
Beira-Mar (PL)	0–1	Marítimo (PL)
Torreense (II)	1–0	Gil Vicente (PL)
Famalicão (II)	0–2	Sporting CP (PL)
Sporting de Espinho (II)	1–1 (aet, p. 2–4)	S. João de Ver (II)
Joane (III)	0–1	Gondomar (II)
Penafiel (LH)	3–2 (aet)	Merelinense (II)
Portosantense (III)	0–2	Ribeira Brava (II)
Académica (PL)	1–0	Oriental Lisboa (II)
Macedo Cavaleiros (II)	1–1 (aet, p. 2–4)	Naval (LH)
Trofense (LH)	1–2 (aet)	Belenenses (LH)
Aves (LH)	4–0	Infesta (III)
Tirsense (II)	3–1	Sampedrense (III)
Mirandela (II)	1–0	Vitória de Setúbal (PL)

Home team	Score	Away team
Lamego (III)	1–4	Sporting Covilhã (LH)
Alcochetense (III)	2–1	União de Leiria (PL)
Santa Maria (III)	1–1 (aet, p. 3–1)	Monsanto (II)
Feirense (PL)	0–1	Nacional (PL)
Lousada (II)	1–0 (aet)	Coimbrões (II)
Leixões (LH)	1–0	Aljustrelense (III)
Anadia (II)	2–3 (aet)	Tondela (II)
Vizela (II)	2–2 (aet, p. 3–1)	Fafe (II)
Juventude de Évora (II)	2–0	Esperança de Lagos (III)
Sporting de Pombal (III)	1–7	Oliveirense (LH)
Moreirense (LH)	3–1	Pontassolense (III)
Pampilhosa (III)	0 - 3	Olhanense (PL)
Vitória de Guimarães (PL)	2–1 (aet)	Moura (II)
Paços de Ferreira (PL)	1–0	Chaves (II)
Estoril (LH)	3–1	Vila Meã (III)
Rio Ave (PL)	5–2 (aet)	Sousense (II)

== Fourth round ==
=== Draw ===
The draw for the fourth round was held on 24 October 2011 at 12:00 WET in Portuguese Football Federation (FPF) headquarters situated in Lisbon, Portugal. The last season finalists, Porto and Vitória de Guimarães, were both in draw. Alcochetense and Santa Maria, both from the Terceira Divisão, were the lowest-ranked teams left in the competition at this stage.

Primeira Liga	Liga de Honra	Segunda Divisão	Terceira Divisão
Benfica; Porto (holders); Braga; Marítimo; Sporting CP; Nacional; Académica de Coimbra; Paços de Ferreira; Rio Ave; Vitória de Guimarães; Olhanense	Naval; Desportivo das Aves; Moreirense; Oliveirense; Sporting da Covilhã; Belenenses; Penafiel; Estoril; Leixões	Torreense; Mirandela; Tirsense; Juventude de Évora; Gondomar; Ribeira Brava; Lousada; S. João de Ver; Tondela; Vizela	Alcochetense; Santa Maria

=== Results ===
The matches were played on November 18, 19 and 20, 2011.

18 November 2011	Naval (LH)	0–1	Benfica (PL)	Figueira da Foz
20:15 WET			Rodrigo 82'	Stadium: Municipal José Bento Pessoa; Referee: Artur Soares Dias

19 November 2011	Moreirense (LH)	7–1	Lousada (II)	Moreira de Cónegos
16:00 WET	Jérémie N'Jock 1', 5', 19'; Gonçalves 8'; Pinto 48'; Ghilas 61'; Carneiro 71'		Oseías 60'	Stadium: Joaquim de Almeida Freitas; Referee: André Gralha

19 November 2011	Académica (PL)	3–0	Porto (PL)	Coimbra
20:15 WET	Marinho 64'; Silva 81'; Valente 89'			Stadium: Cidade de Coimbra; Referee: Bruno Paixão

20 November 2011	S. João de Ver (II)	0–3	Tirsense (II)	Santa Maria da Feira
14:30 WET			Lio 19'; Carlos Pinto 42'; André Soares 71'	Stadium: Sp. Clube São João De Ver; Referee: Fernando Lopes

20 November 2011	Mirandela (II)	1–1 (a.e.t.) (5–4 p)	Gondomar (II)	Mirandela
14:30 WET	Bertinho 5'		Tiago Lenho 18' (pen.)	Stadium: São Sebastião; Referee: Albano Correia

20 November 2011	Alcochetense (III)	0–0 (a.e.t.) (2–4 p)	Olhanense (PL)	Alcochete
14:30 WET				Stadium: António Almeida Correia; Referee: Paulo Baptista

20 November 2011	Ribeira Brava (II)	0–0 (a.e.t.) (5–4 p)	Sporting Covilhã (LH)	Ribeira Brava (Madeira)
15:00 WET				Stadium: Centro Desportivo da Madeira; Referee: Bruno Esteves

20 November 2011	Leixões (LH)	1–0	Santa Maria (III)	Matosinhos
15:00 WET	L. Silva 44'			Stadium: Estádio do Mar; Referee: Rui Silva

20 November 2011	Belenenses (LH)	2–0	Vizela (II)	Lisbon
15:00 WET	Geovane Maranhão 21'; Camará 89'			Stadium: Estádio do Restelo; Referee: João Ferreira

20 November 2011	Estoril (LH)	2–1 (a.e.t.)	Penafiel (LH)	Estoril
15:00 WET	Licá 10'; Adilson 121'		Manoel 31' (pen.)	Stadium: António Coimbra da Mota; Referee: Nuno Almeida

20 November 2011	Juventude de Évora (II)	0–1	Marítimo (PL)	Évora
15:00 WET			Diawara 53'	Stadium: Sanches de Miranda; Referee: Duarte Gomes

20 November 2011	Rio Ave (PL)	2–3 (a.e.t.)	Torreense (II)	Vila do Conde
15:00 WET	Jeferson 69'; Tomás 113' (pen.)		Gouveia 9'; Kaká 103'; João Pedro 107'	Stadium: Estádio do Rio Ave FC; Referee: Rui Patrício

20 November 2011	Tondela (II)	0–1	Oliveirense (LH)	Tondela
15:00 WET			Adriano 11' (pen.)	Stadium: João Cardoso; Referee: Hugo Pacheco

20 November 2011	Paços de Ferreira (PL)	2–2 (a.e.t.) (4–5 p)	Nacional (PL)	Paços de Ferreira
16:00 WET	Stojanović 54' (o.g.); Melgarejo 62'		Neto 27'; Mateus 39'	Stadium: Mata Real; Referee: António Ferreira

20 November 2011	Desportivo das Aves (LH)	0–0 (a.e.t.) (3–2 p)	Vitória de Guimarães (PL)	Vila das Aves (Santo Tirso)
18:00 WET				Stadium: Estádio do CD das Aves; Referee: Jorge Tavares

20 November 2011	Sporting CP (PL)	2–0	Braga (PL)	Lisbon
20:15 WET	Capel 14'; Insúa 21'			Stadium: José Alvalade; Referee: Jorge Sousa

== Fifth round ==
=== Draw ===
The draw for the fifth round was held on 22 November 2011 at 12:00 WET at Portuguese Football Federation (FPF) headquarters in Lisbon. The last season's finalists, Porto and Vitória de Guimarães, were eliminated in the previous round. Torreense, Mirandela, Tirsense and Ribeira Brava from the Portuguese Second Division were the lowest-ranked teams left in the competition at this stage.

Primeira Liga	Liga de Honra	Portuguese Second Division
Benfica; Marítimo; Sporting CP; Nacional; Académica de Coimbra; Olhanense	Desportivo das Aves; Moreirense; Oliveirense; Belenenses; Estoril Praia; Leixões	Torreense; Mirandela; Tirsense; Ribeira Brava

=== Results ===
The matches were played between December 1 and December 5, 2011.

1 December 2011	Moreirense (LH)	2–1	Torreense (II)	Moreira de Cónegos
16:00 WET	Pinto 3'; Wágner 45' (pen.)		Anta 71'	Stadium: Joaquim de Almeida Freitas; Attendance: 600; Referee: Vasco Santos

2 December 2011	Marítimo (PL)	2–1	Benfica (PL)	Funchal
20:15 WET	Sousa 60'; Sami 70'		Saviola 26' (pen.)	Stadium: Estádio dos Barreiros; Referee: Paulo Baptista

3 December 2011	Estoril-Praia (LH)	2–2 (a.e.t.) (2–4 p)	Olhanense (PL)	Estoril
20:15 WET	Coimbra 16'; Vitória 120'		Duarte 90+4' (pen.); Yontcha 112'	Stadium: António Coimbra da Mota; Referee: Bruno Paixão

4 December 2011	Mirandela (II)	1–1 (a.e.t.) (4–5 p)	Oliveirense (LH)	Mirandela
14:30 WET	Ericson 11'		Pedrinho 69'	Stadium: São Sebastião

4 December 2011	Desportivo das Aves (LH)	2–1 (a.e.t.)	Ribeira Brava (II)	Vila das Aves (Santo Tirso)
15:00 WET	Valente 19'; Pires 103'		João Pedro 85'	Stadium: Estádio do CD das Aves; Referee: Jorge Ferreira

4 December 2011	Tirsense (II)	0–0 (a.e.t.) (3–4 p)	Nacional (PL)	Santo Tirso
15:00 WET				Stadium: Abel Alves de Figueiredo; Referee: Bruno Alexandre Da Silva Esteves

4 December 2011	Leixões (LH)	2–5 (a.e.t.)	Académica (PL)	Matosinhos
19:15 WET	Jumisse 39'; Tavares 66'		Silva 37', 98'; Fábio Luís 86', 100'; Éder 120'	Stadium: Estádio do Mar; Referee: Marco Ferreira

5 December 2011	Sporting CP (PL)	2–0	Belenenses (LH)	Lisbon
20:15 WET	Van Wolfswinkel 50'; Schaars 66'			Stadium: José Alvalade

== Quarterfinals ==
=== Draw ===
The draw for the quarterfinals was held on 22 November 2011 at 12:00 WET in Portuguese Football Federation (FPF) headquarters situated in Lisbon, Portugal.

Primeira Liga	Liga de Honra
Marítimo; Sporting CP; Nacional; Académica de Coimbra; Olhanense	Desportivo das Aves; Moreirense; Oliveirense

=== Results ===
The matches were played on December 21 and 22, 2011.

21 December 2011	Académica (PL)	3–2	Desportivo das Aves (LH)	Coimbra
19:00 WET	Éder 4'; Berger 37'; Ba 76'		Pires 11'; Bischoff 90+1'	Stadium: Estádio Cidade de Coimbra; Attendance: 2,310; Referee: Capela

22 December 2011	Sporting CP (PL)	3–0	Marítimo (PL)	Lisbon
19:00 WET	Carrillo 49'; Van Wolfswinkel 60' (pen.); Insúa 82'			Stadium: José Alvalade; Attendance: 21,000; Referee: Dias

22 December 2011	Oliveirense (LH)	2–1	Olhanense (PL)	Oliveira de Azeméis
21:00 WET	Paulo Clemente 25'; Lima 45+2'		Cauê 11'	Stadium: Estádio Carlos Osório; Attendance: 2,500; Referee: Gomes

23 December 2011	Moreirense (LH)	2–2 (a.e.t.) (5–6 p)	Nacional (PL)	Moreira de Cónegos
20:15 WET	Espinho 50' (pen.); Moreira 88'		Claudemir 1' (pen.); Barcelos 20'	Stadium: Joaquim de Almeida Freitas; Referee: Sousa
	Penalties
	Espinho (penalty scored); Carneiro (penalty scored); Moreira (penalty scored); Robson (penalty scored); Wágner (penalty scored); Ghilas (penalty missed)		Madeira (penalty scored); Claudemir (penalty scored); Diego (penalty scored); Rondón (penalty scored); Todorović (penalty scored); Neto (penalty scored)

== Semifinals ==
=== Draw ===
The draw for the sixth round was held on 28 December 2011 at 12:00 WET in Portuguese Football Federation (FPF) headquarters situated in Lisbon, Portugal.

Primeira Liga	Liga de Honra
Sporting CP; Nacional; Académica de Coimbra	Oliveirense

=== First leg ===
11 January 2012	Sporting CP (PL)	2–2	Nacional (PL)	Lisbon
20:15	Elias 78'; Schaars 90+6'		Rondón 36'; Candeias 45+2'	Stadium: José Alvalade; Attendance: 17,881; Referee: Lucílio Baptista

12 January 2012	Académica (PL)	1–0	Oliveirense (LH)	Coimbra
20:15	Sow 90+5'			Stadium: Estádio Cidade de Coimbra; Attendance: 14,357; Referee: Carlos Xistra

=== Second leg ===
7 February 2012	Oliveirense (LH)	2–2 (2–3 agg.)	Académica (PL)	Oliveira de Azeméis
20:15	Paulo Clemente 18'; Adriano 26' (pen.)		Marinho 20', 55'	Stadium: Estádio Carlos Osório; Attendance: 5,000; Referee: Marco Ferreira

8 February 2012	Nacional (PL)	1–3 (3–5 agg.)	Sporting CP (PL)	Funchal
20:15	Barcelos 63'	Report	Rinaudo 18'; Van Wolfswinkel 75'; Pereira 90+4'	Stadium: Estádio da Madeira

== Final ==
20 May 2012
17:00 UTC+1

Académica	1–0	Sporting CP
Marinho 4'

Estádio Nacional, Oeiras, Portugal
Attendance: 37,522
Referee: Paulo Baptista (Portalegre)

== Top scorers ==
Rank	Player	Club	Goals
1	(Netherlands) Ricky van Wolfswinkel	Sporting CP	5
2	(Portugal) Marinho	Académica de Coimbra	4
2	(Brazil) Walter	Porto	4
4	(Portugal) Adrien Silva	Académica de Coimbra	3
4	(Portugal) Djão	Alcochetense	3
4	(Cameroon) Jérémie N'Jock	Moreirense	3
4	(Portugal) João Tomás	Rio Ave	3
4	(Portugal) Miguel Rosa	Belenenses	3

Last updated: 27 January 2013
