= 2013–14 FC Porto season =

Porto
2013–14 season
- President: Jorge Nuno Pinto da Costa
- Manager: Paulo Fonseca (June 2013–March 2014); Luís Castro (March–May 2014)
- Stadium: Estádio do Dragão
- Primeira Liga: 3rd
- Taça de Portugal: Semi-finals
- Taça da Liga: Semi-finals
- UEFA Champions League: Group stage (3rd)
- UEFA Europa League: Quarter-finals
- Top goalscorer: League: Jackson Martínez (20); All: Jackson Martínez (29)
Home colours	Away colours	Third colours

The 2013–14 FC Porto season in domestic and international football competitions.

== Pre-season and friendlies ==
=== Legend ===
Win Draw Loss

6 July 2013 Friendly	Porto	14–0	Bradley Stoke Youth	Olival
11:30	Carlos Eduardo 6'; Iturbe 12'; Defour 20'; Castro 40'; Fernando 47'; Varela 54', 76', 80', 90'; Josué 61'; González 64'; Danilo 67'; Atsu 70'; Mangala 87'			Stadium: CTFD PortoGaia

10 July 2013 Friendly	MVV Maastricht	0–6	Porto	Mopertingen, Belgium
18:00			Varela 21'; Ghilas 24'; Castro 31'; Martínez 53'; Iturbe 65' (pen.); Izmailov 88'	Stadium: Complex Spouwen-Mopertingen; Referee: Christof Virant (Belgium)

13 July 2013 Valais Cup	Marseille	0–3	Porto	Sion, Switzerland
20:30			Izmailov 29'; Martínez 56'; Iturbe 76'

21 July 2013 Copa EuroAmericana	Deportivo Anzoátegui	2–4	Porto	Puerto la Cruz, Venezuela
19:00 UTC-04:30	Aguilar 39'; Fuenmayor 62'		Martínez 53'; Mangala 64'; Varela 65', 90+3'	Stadium: Estadio José Antonio Anzoátegui; Referee: Maiker Moreno (Venezuela)

24 July 2013 Copa EuroAmericana	Millonarios	0–4	Porto	Bogotá, Colombia
21:30 UTC-05:00			Danilo 29', 52', 72'; Martínez 85'	Stadium: Estadio El Campín; Attendance: 20,000; Referee: Juan Soto (Venezuela)

28 July 2013 Friendly	Porto	1–0	Celta Vigo	Porto
17:00	Martínez 12'			Stadium: Estádio do Dragão; Attendance: 48,500; Referee: Hugo Pachecho (Portugal)

3 August 2013 Emirates Cup	Galatasaray	1–0	Porto	London, England
14:00 BST	Melo 71' (pen.)			Stadium: Emirates Stadium; Referee: Andre Marriner (England)

4 August 2013 Emirates Cup	Napoli	1–3	Porto	London, England
15:00 BST	Pandev 43' (pen.)		Ghilas 50'; Fernández 68' (o.g.); Licá 78'	Stadium: Emirates Stadium; Referee: Anthony Taylor (England)

== Competitions ==
=== Overview ===
Competition	Started round	Final position / round	First match	Last match
Primeira Liga	—	3rd	18 August 2013	11 May 2014
Taça de Portugal	Third round	Semi-finals	19 October 2013	16 April 2014
Taça da Liga	Group stage	Semi-finals	30 December 2013	27 April 2014
UEFA Champions League	Group stage	Group stage	18 September 2013	11 December 2013
UEFA Europa League	Round of 32		20 February 2014	10 April 2014

Updated to match played 11 May 2014
Source: Competitions

=== Supertaça Cândido de Oliveira ===
10 August 2013	Porto	3–0	Vitória de Guimarães	Aveiro
20:45 WEST	Licá 5'; Martínez 17'; González 45'			Stadium: Estádio Municipal de Aveiro; Referee: Artur Soares Dias

=== Primeira Liga ===
==== League table ====
Pos	Team	Pld	W	D	L	GF	GA	GD	Pts	Qualification or relegation
1	Benfica (C)	30	23	5	2	58	18	+40	74	Qualification to Champions League group stage
2	Sporting CP	30	20	7	3	54	20	+34	67	Qualification to Champions League group stage
3	Porto	30	19	4	7	57	25	+32	61	Qualification to Champions League play-off round
4	Estoril	30	15	9	6	42	26	+16	54	Qualification to Europa League group stage
5	Nacional	30	11	12	7	43	33	+10	45	Qualification to Europa League play-off round

Source: LPFP (in Portuguese)
Rules for classification: 1) Points; 2) Head-to-head points; 3) Head-to-head goal difference; 4) Head-to-head away goals scored; 5) Goal difference; 6) Matches won; 7) Goals scored; 8) Play-off.
(Note: LPFP decided that only criteria 1, 5, 6 and 7 would be applied to establish the classification during the competition.)
(C) Champions

==== Matches ====
18 August 2013 1	Vitória de Setúbal	1–3	Porto	Setúbal
20:00 WEST	Martins 13'	Report	Josué 49' (pen.); Quintero 61'; Martínez 88'	Stadium: Estádio do Bonfim; Attendance: 6,219; Referee: João Capela

25 August 2013 2	Porto	3–0	Marítimo	Porto
19:45 WEST	Martínez 27'; Licá 37'; Josué 49' (pen.)	Report		Stadium: Estádio do Dragão; Attendance: 41,009; Referee: Jorge Ferreira

1 September 2013 3	Paços de Ferreira	0–1	Porto	Paços de Ferreira
17:45 WEST		Report	Martínez 76'	Stadium: Estádio Capital do Móvel; Attendance: 6,218; Referee: Rui Costa

14 September 2013 4	Porto	2–0	Gil Vicente	Porto
20:15 WEST	Varela 8'; Martínez 27'	Report		Stadium: Estádio do Dragão; Attendance: 36,517

22 September 2013 5	Estoril	2–2	Porto	Estoril
20:15 WEST	Evandro 35' (pen.); Leal 80'	Report	Licá 26'; Martínez 66'	Stadium: Estádio António Coimbra da Mota; Attendance: 4,689; Referee: Rui Silva

28 September 2013 6	Porto	1–0	Vitória de Guimarães	Porto
20:00 WEST	Josué 50' (pen.)	Report		Stadium: Estádio do Dragão; Attendance: 32,209; Referee: Pedro Proença

6 October 2013 7	Arouca	1–3	Porto	Arouca
18:15 WEST	Pintassilgo 90'	Report	Martínez 12', 74'; Quintero 90+2'	Stadium: Estádio Municipal de Arouca; Attendance: 4,892; Referee: Vasco Santos

27 October 2013 8	Porto	3–1	Sporting CP	Porto
20:00 WEST	Josué 11' (pen.); Danilo 62'; González 74'	Report	Carvalho 60'	Stadium: Estádio do Dragão; Attendance: 48,100; Referee: Artur Soares Dias

3 November 2013 9	Belenenses	1–1	Porto	Belenenses
20:00 WEST	João Pedro 33'	Report	Mangusta 30'	Stadium: Estádio de Restelo; Attendance: 9,245; Referee: Manuel Rota

23 November 2013 10	Porto	1–1	Nacional	Porto
21:15 WEST	Martínez 52'; Herrera (yellow card) 59'	Report	Zainadine (yellow card) 72'; Rondón 82'; Mateus (yellow card) 82'; Sequeira (yellow card) 86'	Stadium: Estádio do Dragão; Attendance: 26,404; Referee: Carlos Xistra

30 November 2013 11	Académica	1–0	Porto	Coimbra
21:15 WEST	Alexandre 44'; Marinho (yellow card) 79'; Capela (yellow card) 80'; Reiner (yellow card) 90'	Report	Danilo (yellow card) 65'; Varela (yellow card) 67'; Fernando (yellow card) 79'	Stadium: Estádio Cidade de Coimbra; Attendance: 4,562; Referee: João Carlos Santos Capela

7 December 2013 12	Porto	2–0	Braga	Porto
21:15 WEST	Alex Sandro (yellow card) 22'; Mangala (yellow card) 41'; Martínez 48', 80'; Herrera (yellow card) 50'	Report	Echiéjilé (yellow card) 50'	Stadium: Estádio do Dragão; Attendance: 31,129; Referee: Paulo Baptista

15 December 2013 13	Rio Ave	1–3	Porto	Vila do Conde
21:15 WEST	Edimar 22'; Marcelo (yellow card) 81'	Report	Maicon 6'; Martínez 51'; Danilo (yellow card) 63', (goal) 82'	Stadium: Estádio do Rio Ave FC; Attendance: 3,896; Referee: Bruno Esteves

20 December 2013 14	Porto	4–0	Olhanense	Porto
19:00 WEST	Mangala 30'; Martínez 53'; Carlos Eduardo 81'; Herrera 84'	Report		Stadium: Estádio do Dragão; Attendance: 20,622; Referee: Hugo Miguel

12 January 2014 15	Benfica	2–0	Porto	Lisbon
16:00 WEST	Rodrigo 13'; Garay 53'	Report		Stadium: Estádio da Luz; Attendance: 62,508; Referee: Artur Soares Dias

19 January 2014 16	Porto	3–0	Vitória de Setúbal	Porto
19:15 WEST	Martínez 10'; Varela 34'; Carlos Eduardo 85'	Report		Stadium: Estádio do Dragão; Attendance: 24,209; Referee: Hugo Pacheco

1 February 2014 17	Marítimo	1–0	Porto	Funchal
17:15 WEST	Derley 14'	Report		Stadium: Estádio dos Barreiros; Attendance: 4,532; Referee: Nuno Almeida

9 February 2014 18	Porto	3–0	Paços de Ferreira	Porto
18:45 WEST		Report	Quaresma 43'; Martínez 87'; Pereira 90+2'	Stadium: Estádio do Dragão; Attendance: 17,307; Referee: Cosme Machado

16 February 2014 19	Gil Vicente	1–2	Porto	Barcelos
19:15 WEST	Varela 18'; Varela 53'	Report	Vieira 54'	Stadium: Estádio Cidade de Barcelos; Attendance: 4,872; Referee: Paulo Baptista

23 February 2014 20	Porto	0–1	Estoril	Porto
19:15 WEST		Report	Evandro 78'	Stadium: Estádio do Dragão; Attendance: 25,809; Referee: Vasco Santos

2 March 2014 21	Vitória de Guimarães	2–2	Porto	Guimarães
19:15 WEST	Maâzou 45'; Matias 52'	Report	Quaresma 18'; Licá 41'	Stadium: Estádio D. Afonso Henriques; Attendance: 15,505; Referee: Marco Ferreira

9 March 2014 22	Porto	4–1	Arouca	Porto
19:15 WEST	Quaresma 11', 83'; Carlos Eduardo 23'; Martínez 90+1'	Report	Sampaio 29'	Stadium: Estádio do Dragão; Attendance: 27,507; Referee: Hugo Miguel

16 March 2014 23	Sporting CP	1–0	Porto	Lisbon
19:15 WEST	Slimani 52'	Report		Stadium: Estádio José Alvalade; Attendance: 36,692; Referee: Pedro Proença

23 March 2014 24	Porto	1–0	Belenenses	Porto
20:15 WEST	Alex Sandro (yellow card) 59'; Quintero 79'; Pereira (yellow card) 84'	Report	Afonso (red card) 44'; T. Silva (yellow card) 45+4'; Geraldes (yellow card) 87'; Ferreira (yellow card) 87'	Stadium: Estádio do Dragão; Attendance: 27,509; Referee: Carlos Xistra

=== Taça de Portugal ===
19 October 2013 Third round	Porto	1–0	Trofense	Porto
19:00 WEST	Varela 25'	Report		Stadium: Estádio do Dragão; Attendance: 21,117; Referee: Manuel Oliveira

10 November 2013 Fourth round	Vitória de Guimarães	0–2	Porto	Guimarães
19:00 WET		Report	Fernando 15'; Martínez 41'	Stadium: Estádio D. Afonso Henriques; Referee: Jorge Sousa

4 January 2014 Fifth round	Porto	6–0	Atlético CP	Porto
18:00 WET	Varela 24', 73'; Defour 37'; Marinheiro 46' (o.g.); Otamendi 76'; Kelvin 90'	Report		Stadium: Estádio do Dragão; Attendance: 20,117; Referee: Jorge Tavares

5 February 2014 Quarter-finals	Porto	2–1	Estoril	Porto
21:00 WET	Quaresma 43'; Ghilas 87'	Report	Babanco 28'	Stadium: Estádio do Dragão; Attendance: 10,507; Referee: Rui Costa

26 March 2014 Semi-finals; First leg	Porto	1–0	Benfica	Porto
21:00 WET	Martínez 6'	Report		Stadium: Estádio do Dragão; Attendance: 34,499; Referee: Marco Ferreira

16 April 2014 Semi-finals; Second leg	Benfica	3–1 (3–2 agg.)	Porto	Lisbon
20:45 WEST	Salvio 17'; Pérez 58' (pen.); Gomes 80'	Report	Varela 52'	Stadium: Estádio da Luz; Attendance: 45,380; Referee: Pedro Proença

=== Taça da Liga ===
==== Third round ====
Group B
Pos	Team	Pld	W	D	L	GF	GA	GD	Pts	Qualification
1	Porto	3	2	1	0	7	2	+5	7	Advance to knockout phase
2	Sporting CP	3	2	1	0	6	1	+5	7	
3	Marítimo	3	0	1	2	2	6	−4	1	
4	Penafiel	3	0	1	2	1	7	−6	1	

29 December 2013 1	Sporting CP	0–0	Porto	Lisbon
20:45 WET		Report		Stadium: Estádio José Alvalade; Attendance: 21,505; Referee: Olegário Benquerença

15 January 2014 2	Porto	4–0	Penafiel	Porto
18:30 WET	Quaresma 11'; Martínez 63', 76'; Varela 78'	Report		Stadium: Estádio do Dragão; Attendance: 12,507; Referee: Duarte Gomes

25 January 2014 3	Porto	3–2	Marítimo	Porto
20:45 WET	Martínez 20'; Carlos Eduardo 85'; Josué 90+6' (pen.)	Report	João Diogo 22'; Artur 34'	Stadium: Estádio do Dragão; Attendance: 20,109; Referee: Manuel Mota

==== Knockout phase ====
27 April 2014 Semi-finals	Porto	0–0 (3–4 p)	Benfica	Porto
18:15 WEST		Report		Stadium: Estádio do Dragão; Attendance: 26,104; Referee: Marco Ferreira
	Penalties
	Quintero (penalty scored); Martínez (penalty missed); Ghilas (penalty scored); Maicon (penalty missed); Varela (penalty scored); Fernando (penalty missed)		(penalty scored) Siqueira; (penalty missed) Garay; (penalty scored) Jardel; (penalty missed) Gomes; (penalty scored) Pérez; (penalty scored) Cavaleiro

=== UEFA Champions League ===
==== Group stage ====
Pos	Team	Pld	W	D	L	GF	GA	GD	Pts	Qualification	ATM	ZEN	POR	AWI
1	(Spain) Atlético Madrid	6	5	1	0	15	3	+12	16	Advance to knockout phase	—	3–1	2–0	4–0
2	(Russia) Zenit Saint Petersburg	6	1	3	2	5	9	−4	6	Advance to knockout phase	1–1	—	1–1	0–0
3	(Portugal) Porto	6	1	2	3	4	7	−3	5 (Note: Head-to-head points: Porto 4, Austria Wien 1.)	Transfer to Europa League	1–2	0–1	—	1–1
4	Austria Wien	6	1	2	3	5	10	−5	5		0–3	4–1	0–1	—

Source: UEFA
Notes:

18 September 2013 1	Austria Wien	0–1	(Portugal) Porto	Vienna, Austria
20:45 CEST (UTC+02:00)	Koch (yellow card) 42'; Hosiner (yellow card) 67'	Report	Alex Sandro (yellow card) 43'; González 55'; Varela (yellow card) 71'	Stadium: Ernst-Happel-Stadion; Attendance: 33,855; Referee: Craig Thomson (Scotland)

1 October 2013 2	Porto (Portugal)	1–2	(Spain) Atlético Madrid	Porto, Portugal
20:45 CEST (UTC+02:00)	Martínez 16'; Josué (yellow card) 29'; Mangala (yellow card) 85'	Report	Tiago (yellow card) 55'; Godín 58'; Juanfran (yellow card) 62'; Turan 86'	Stadium: Estádio do Dragão; Attendance: 33,989; Referee: Howard Webb (England)

22 October 2013 3	Porto (Portugal)	0–1	(Russia) Zenit Saint Petersburg	Porto, Portugal
20:45 CEST (UTC+02:00)	Herrera (yellow card) 5' (yellow-red card) 6'; González (yellow card) 72'; Martínez (yellow card) 74'	Report	Fayzulin (yellow card) 36'; Shirokov (yellow card) 42'; Kerzhakov 86'; Neto (yellow card) 90+4'	Stadium: Estádio do Dragão; Attendance: 31,109; Referee: Paolo Tagliavento (Italy)

6 November 2013 4	Zenit Saint Petersburg (Russia)	1–1	(Portugal) Porto	Saint Petersburg, Russia
18:00 CET (UTC+01:00)	Hulk 28'; Shatov (yellow card) 85'; Zyryanov (yellow card) 89'	Report	González 23'; Fernando (yellow card) 56'; Alex Sandro (yellow card) 61'	Stadium: Petrovsky Stadium; Attendance: 17,786; Referee: Tom Harald Hagen (Norway)

26 November 2013 5	Porto (Portugal)	1–1	Austria Wien	Porto, Portugal
20:45 CET (UTC+01:00)	Martínez 48'	Report	Kienast 11'; Suttner (yellow card) 55'; Rogulj (yellow card) 90+1'; Leovac (yellow card) 90+3'	Stadium: Estádio do Dragão; Attendance: 24,809; Referee: Ovidiu Hațegan (Romania)

11 December 2013 6	Atlético Madrid (Spain)	2–0	(Portugal) Porto	Madrid, Spain
20:45 CET (UTC+01:00)	García 14'; Aranzubia (yellow card) 27'; Costa 37'; Alderweireld (yellow card) 54'; Insúa (yellow card) 66'	Report	Josué (yellow card) 6'; González (yellow card) 31'; Defour (yellow card) 37'; Martínez (yellow card) 41'; Mangala (yellow card) 78'	Stadium: Vicente Calderón Stadium; Attendance: 24,629; Referee: Deniz Aytekin (Germany)

=== UEFA Europa League ===
==== Knockout phase ====
===== Round of 32 =====
20 February 2014 First leg	Porto (Portugal)	2–2	(Germany) Eintracht Frankfurt	Porto, Portugal
21:05 CET (UTC+01:00)	Quaresma 44'; Varela 68'	Report	Schwegler (yellow card) 29'; Russ (yellow card) 36'; Joselu 72'; Alex Sandro 77' (o.g.)	Stadium: Estádio do Dragão; Attendance: 25,107; Referee: Matej Jug (Slovenia)

27 February 2014 Second leg	Eintracht Frankfurt (Germany)	3–3 (5–5a agg.)	(Portugal) Porto	Frankfurt, Germany
19:00 CET (UTC+01:00)	Aigner (yellow card) 25', (goal) 37'; Meier 52', 76', (yellow card) 75'; Zambrano (yellow card) 62'; Jung (yellow card) 88'	Report	Maicon (yellow card) 41'; Herrera (yellow card) 51'; Mangala 58', 71'; Ghilas (yellow card) 62', (goal) 86'	Stadium: Commerzbank Arena; Attendance: 48,000; Referee: Björn Kuipers (Netherlands)

===== Round of 16 =====
13 March 2014 First leg	Porto (Portugal)	1–0	(Italy) Napoli	Porto, Portugal
19:00 CET (UTC+01:00)	Martínez 57'; Alex Sandro (yellow card) 70'	Report	Réveillère (yellow card) 59'; Behrami (yellow card) 71'	Stadium: Estádio do Dragão; Attendance: 25,520; Referee: Pavel Královec (Czech Republic)

20 March 2014 Second leg	Napoli (Italy)	2–2 (2–3 agg.)	(Portugal) Porto	Naples, Italy
21:05 CET (UTC+01:00)	Pandev 21'; Henrique (yellow card) 52'; Behrami (yellow card) 70'; Zapata 90+2'	Report	Ghilas 69'; Quaresma 76'; Fernando (yellow card) 90'	Stadium: Stadio San Paolo; Attendance: 54,145; Referee: Martin Atkinson (England)

===== Quarter-finals =====
3 April 2014 First leg	Porto (Portugal)	1–0	(Spain) Sevilla	Porto, Portugal
21:05 CEST (UTC+02:00)	Mangala 31'; Martínez (yellow card) 43'; Fernando (yellow card) 87' (yellow-red card) 87'	Report	Moreno (yellow card) 15'; Reyes (yellow card) 69'	Stadium: Estádio do Dragão; Attendance: 31,122; Referee: Wolfgang Stark (German Football Association)

10 April 2014 Second leg	Sevilla (Spain)	4–1 (4–2 agg.)	(Portugal) Porto	Seville, Spain
21:05 CEST (UTC+02:00)	Rakitić 5' (pen.); Vitolo 26'; Bacca 29', (yellow card) 66'; Coke (yellow card) 32' (yellow-red card) 54'; Gameiro 79'	Report	Mangala (yellow card) 29'; Danilo (yellow card) 29'; Varela (yellow card) 31'; Quaresma (yellow card) 32', (goal) 90+2'; Pereira (yellow card) 75'	Stadium: Ramón Sánchez Pizjuán Stadium; Attendance: 31,422; Referee: Gianluca Rocchi (Italy)

== Squad ==
=== Current squad ===
Note: Flags indicate national team as defined under FIFA eligibility rules; some limited exceptions apply. Players may hold more than one non-FIFA nationality.

No.	Pos.	Nation	Player
1	GK	BRA	Helton
2	DF	BRA	Danilo
3	DF	ARG	Lucho González (captain)
4	DF	BRA	Maicon
7	FW	POR	Ricardo Quaresma
8	MF	POR	Josué
9	FW	COL	Jackson Martínez
10	MF	COL	Juan Quintero
11	FW	ALG	Nabil Ghilas
13	DF	MEX	Diego Reyes
16	MF	MEX	Héctor Herrera
17	FW	POR	Silvestre Varela

No.	Pos.	Nation	Player
19	FW	POR	Licá
20	MF	BRA	Carlos Eduardo
21	FW	POR	Ricardo Pereira
22	DF	FRA	Eliaquim Mangala
23	DF	SEN	Abdoulaye Ba
24	GK	BRA	Fabiano
25	MF	BRA	Fernando
26	DF	BRA	Alex Sandro
28	FW	BRA	Kelvin
35	MF	BEL	Steven Defour
41	GK	ANG	Kadú

== Transfers ==
=== In ===
Note: Flags indicate national team as defined under FIFA eligibility rules; some limited exceptions apply. Players may hold more than one non-FIFA nationality.

No.	Pos.	Nation	Player
—	GK	TUR	Sinan Bolat (free transfer)
—	DF	MEX	Diego Reyes (from América – €7,000,000)
—	MF	MEX	Héctor Herrera (from Pachuca – €8,000,000)
—	MF	BRA	Carlos Eduardo (from Estoril – €1,200,000)
—	MF	COL	Juan Quintero (from Pescara (loaned from Atlético Nacional) – €5,000,000)
—	MF	POR	Josué (from Paços de Ferreira – undisclosed)
—	MF	POR	Tiago Rodrigues (from Vitória de Guimarães – nominal fee)
—	FW	POR	Ricardo Pereira (from Vitória de Guimarães – €500,000)
—	FW	POR	Licá (from Estoril – undisclosed)
—	FW	POR	Ricardo Quaresma (free transfer)
—	FW	ALG	Nabil Ghilas (from Moreirense – €3,000,000)

=== Out ===
Note: Flags indicate national team as defined under FIFA eligibility rules; some limited exceptions apply. Players may hold more than one non-FIFA nationality.

No.	Pos.	Nation	Player
—	GK	BRA	Rafael Bracalli (to Panetolikos – free transfer)
—	GK	TUR	Sinan Bolat (to Kayserispor – loan)
—	DF	SEN	Abdoulaye Ba (to Vitória de Guimarães – loan)
—	DF	ARG	Nicolás Otamendi (to Valencia – €12,000,000)
—	DF	POR	Henrique Sereno (to Kayserispor – free transfer)
—	DF	POR	Rolando (to Internazionale – loan)
—	MF	POR	Tiago Rodrigues (to Vitória Guimarães – loan)
—	MF	POR	André Castro (to Kasımpaşa – loan)
—	MF	POR	João Moutinho (to Monaco – €25,000,000)
—	MF	COL	James Rodríguez (to Monaco – €45,000,000)
—	MF	RUS	Marat Izmailov (to Gabala – loan)
—	MF	ARG	Lucho González (to Al Rayyan – €4,500,000)
—	FW	PAR	Juan Iturbe (to Hellas Verona – loan)
—	FW	GHA	Christian Atsu (to Chelsea – €4,100,000)
—	FW	POR	Ukra (to Rio Ave – free transfer)
