= RVW =

RVW or RvW may refer to:

- Ralph Vaughan Williams (1872–1958), English composer of symphonies, chamber music, opera, choral music, and film scores
- Richard von Weizsäcker (1920–2015), German statesman and President of Germany, 1984–1994
- Ricky van Wolfswinkel (born 1989), Dutch footballer
- Roe v. Wade, a landmark decision by the United States Supreme Court on the issue of abortion
