= Luís Pinto =

Luís Pinto may refer to:

- Luís Filipe Santos Pinto (born 1982), Portuguese football player
- Luís Miguel Correia Pinto (born 1989), Portuguese football manager and former player
- Luís Pinto de Soveral, 1st Marquis of Soveral
- Luís Pinto de Sousa Coutinho, 1st Viscount of Balsemão
