= Sporting Portugal Fund =

Portuguese football Investment Fund

Sporting Portugal Fund is a Portuguese football investment fund dedicated on Sporting CP players. It was managed by "ESAF – Espírito Santo Fundos de Investimento Mobiliário S.A.". At first the fund had 3,000,000 units with €5 each.

FIFA did not allowed third parties to have "significant" influence on players, which in reverse minority interest was not banned. Sporting closed its relation to previous investment fund in 2007, but "Sporting Clube de Portugal – Futebol, SAD", the company that operation football section of the athletic club, had a negative equity of €29.646 million in 2010–11 season. Co-current with issue bonds, re-capitalization, Sporting had to find an alternative way to improve the financial condition. Benfica had set up a successful Benfica Stars Fund which purchased around €40M from the club. The club gave up a portion of future transfer fee received in return. After months of preparation, Sporting announced the fund would start operate in August 2011.

In August 2011, Sporting announced that the fund had a size of €15 million and opened to subscription. On 18 August, Sporting started to sell new signing, current players and youth product to the fund for cash.

== Investments ==
Date	Players	Nationality	Percentage	Sporting Retained	Price	Departed date	Departed team	Departed revenue (adj.)	Other stakeholder
18 August 2011	André Santos	Portugal	50%	25% (2011–12 Q4)	€1.75M	2013			25% ?
18 August 2011	Diogo Salomão	Portugal	25%	?	€1.0M				
18 August 2011	Renato Neto	Brazil	40%	40% (2011–12 Q3)	€0.8M	2013			20% ?
18 August 2011	William Owusu	Ghana	40%	?	€0.4M				
18 August 2011	Wilson Eduardo	Portugal	40%	?	€0.6M				
18 August 2011	André Martins	Portugal	40%	35% (2011–12 Q4)	€0.8M				25% ?
18 August 2011	Zézinho	Guinea-Bissau	10%	?	€0.15M				
18 August 2011	William Carvalho	Portugal	40%	?	€0.4M				
22 September 2011	Jeffrén Suárez	Spain	25%	75% (2011–12 Q2)	€1.375M				Barcelona (20% added value)
22 September 2011	Diego Capel	Spain	20%	75% (2011–12 Q4)	€0.95M				Sevilla (20% added value); 5% ?
22 September 2011	André Carrillo	Peru	20%	30% (2011–12 Q3)	€0.6M				50% ?
22 September 2011	Fabián Rinaudo	Argentina	15%	35% (2011–12 Q2)	€0.525M				Quality Sports Investments (50%)
23 January 2012	Emiliano Insúa	Argentina	15%	35% (2011–12 Q4)	€0.525M	2013			50% ?
23 January 2012	Diego Rubio	Chile	15%	25% (2011–12 Q4)	€0.45M				Quality Sports Investments (40%); 20% ?
23 January 2012	Ricky van Wolfswinkel	Netherlands	15%	35% (2011–12 Q3)	€0.975M	23 March 2013	(England) Norwich City	€1.5M	Quality Sports Investments (50%)
29 February 2012	Santiago Arias	Colombia	4%	46% (2011–12 Q4)	€0.1M	2013			50% ?
29 February 2012	Betinho	Portugal	5%	?	€0.05M				
29 February 2012	Filipe Chaby	Portugal	2.5%	?	€0.05M				Quality Sports Investments (50%)
2013	Cédric Soares	Portugal	25%		€0.625M				
2013	Nuno Reis	Portugal	15%		€0.225M				
2013	João Mário	Portugal	15%		€0.24M				
2013	Zezinho	Guinea-Bissau	15%		€0.3M				
2013	Seejou King		40%		€0.8M				
	Total								

== See also ==
- Third-party ownership in association football
