= Pedro Emanuel =

Portuguese footballer and manager

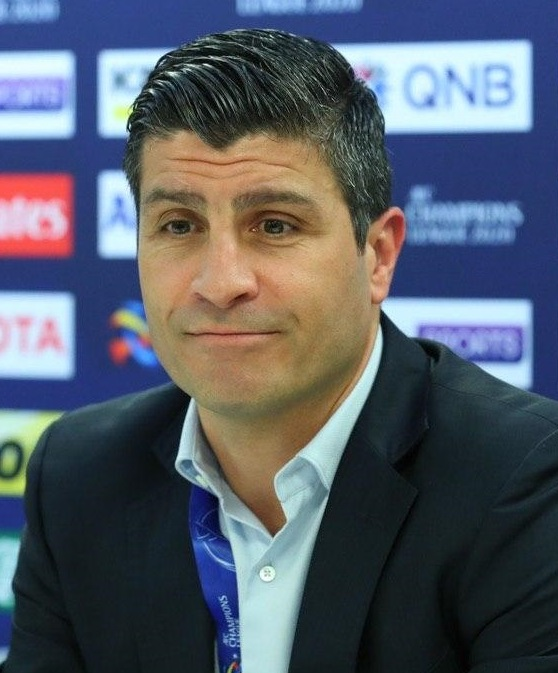
- Pedro Emanuel in 2020

Personal information
- Full name: Pedro Emanuel dos Santos Martins Silva
- Date of birth: 11 February 1975 (age 51)
- Place of birth: Luanda, Angola
- Height: 1.80 m (5 ft 11 in)
- Position: Defender

Team information
- Current team: Vasco da Gama (head coach)

Youth career
- 1986–1993: Boavista

Senior career*
Years	Team	Apps	(Gls)
1993–1994	Marco	29	(2)
1994–1995	Ovarense	31	(2)
1995–1996	Penafiel	28	(2)
1996–2002	Boavista	149	(1)
2002–2009	Porto	119	(1)
Total		356	(8)

International career
1996–1997	Portugal U21	4	(0)

Managerial career
- 2010–2011: Porto (assistant)
- 2011–2013: Académica
- 2013–2015: Arouca
- 2015–2016: Apollon Limassol
- 2017: Estoril
- 2018–2019: Al Taawoun
- 2019: Almería
- 2020–2021: Al Ain
- 2021: Al Nassr
- 2022–2024: Al-Khaleej
- 2024–2026: Al-Fayha
- 2026–: Vasco da Gama
- * Club domestic league appearances and goals

Pedro Emanuel dos Santos Martins Silva (born 11 February 1975), known as Pedro Emanuel, is a Portuguese former professional footballer who played mainly as a central defender. He is the current head coach of Campeonato Brasileiro Série A club CR Vasco da Gama.

In a 16-year career, he was closely associated with the two biggest teams in Porto, Boavista – he helped them win their only Primeira Liga title in 2001 – and Porto, being team captain of both. He amassed top-division totals of 268 matches and two goals over 12 seasons, and won 14 major titles between both clubs.

Pedro Emanuel subsequently became a manager, leading three teams in his country's top flight as well as working in Cyprus, Saudi Arabia, Spain and the United Arab Emirates. He won domestic cups with Académica in 2012, Apollon Limassol in 2016 and Al Taawoun in 2019.

== Club career ==
Pedro Emanuel was born in Luanda, Portuguese Angola. After three seasons as a professional in Portugal's secondary leagues, with Marco, Ovarense and Penafiel, his performances caught the eye of scouts from Porto club Boavista, where he had already played as a youth. During his six-year stay in the team he played a large part in the defensive wall – with fellow stopper Litos, full-backs Nuno Frechaut and Erivan and goalkeeper Ricardo – that led them to the historical Primeira Liga title in 2001; after Litos left for Málaga, he captained the team.

Prior to the start of the 2002–03 campaign, Benfica seemed closer to clinching a deal, but it was Porto, under the guidance of José Mourinho, who signed Pedro Emanuel. Part of a strong defense that included Jorge Costa, Ricardo Carvalho, Paulo Ferreira and Nuno Valente, his always effective style earned him the confidence of his manager, and he played in both the UEFA Cup and UEFA Champions League finals won between 2003 and 2004.

In the season after the departure of Mourinho, Pedro Emanuel still managed to appear in the spotlight, as in the 2004 Intercontinental Cup win against Once Caldas, where he scored the decisive penalty, becoming the last player to touch the ball in the competition's history.

In 2005–06, as Dutch coach Co Adriaanse decided he did not want a goalkeeper as captain (Vítor Baía) and sidelined Costa, Pedro Emanuel was chosen for the role. He missed the entire following season due to injury, but returned to the starting lineups the next campaign, helping with 19 league appearances as Porto were crowned back-to-back champions.

== International career ==
Although Angolan-born, Pedro Emanuel never appeared for its national team. This was viewed as a desire to keep alive the possibility of playing for Portugal, whom he represented as a youth.

Prior to the 2006 FIFA World Cup, Pedro Emanuel accepted a call-up from Angola but FIFA confirmed that he and Carlos Chaínho could not represent other teams than Portugal, because of a new law set-up in 2004 which considered playing for junior sides at international level.

== Coaching career ==
=== Youth and assistant ===
After only five matches in 2008–09, in a fourth consecutive league accolade, Pedro Emanuel retired on 16 June 2009. He immediately became Porto's under-17 head coach, guiding them to the national championship after defeating Sporting CP.

In July 2010, Pedro Emanuel returned to Porto's main squad, being named assistant manager to newly appointed André Villas-Boas.

=== Primeira Liga and Cyprus ===
In June 2011, Pedro Emanuel had his first head coach experience, being appointed at Académica de Coimbra. In his first season with the Students, Pedro Emanuel narrowly avoided relegation from the top flight. He also led the side to their first Taça de Portugal since 1939, notably defeating former club Porto 3–0 at home in the fourth round and Sporting in the final (1–0).

Pedro Emanuel took over at recently promoted Arouca on 6 June 2013. After helping evade top-tier relegation by five points, he left the club on 25 May 2015.

On 10 June 2015, Pedro Emanuel moved abroad for the first time in his career, taking over at Apollon Limassol of the Cypriot First Division; his team already included three compatriots. He won the cup and supercup in his first season, but was sacked on 11 December 2016.

Pedro Emanuel went back to his country and signed as manager of Estoril on 8 March 2017. On 21 October of that year, as the side ranked last in the league and had already been ousted from the domestic cup by lowly Farense, he was relieved of his duties.

=== Middle East and Almería ===
Pedro Emanuel spent the 2018–19 campaign in charge of Al Taawoun of the Saudi Professional League, where he came third. The team from Buraidah won the King's Cup, with a 2–1 win over Al-Ittihad in the final on 2 May 2019.

On 4 August 2019, Pedro Emanuel was appointed at the helm of Spanish Segunda División side Almería. Exactly three months later, in spite of being placed second in the standings, he left by mutual agreement.

Pedro Emanuel returned to the Middle East on 5 January 2020 when he was appointed on an 18-month deal at Al Ain in the UAE Pro League. Despite qualifying for a President's Cup final before the season was cancelled, he left when his contract expired in May 2021.

At the start of October 2021, Pedro Emanuel went back to the Saudi main division, to take over at third-place Al Nassr until the end of the season. After only five matches, however, he left.

On 3 July 2022, Pedro Emanuel signed with newly promoted Al-Khaleej. In June 2023, after having managed to avoid relegation, he renewed his contract for two more years; one year later, however, he left by mutual consent.

On 10 December 2024, Pedro Emanuel was appointed at fellow top-tier Al-Fayha until the end of the campaign. On his debut the following 11 January, his 17th-placed side achieved a 1–1 home draw against leaders Al-Ittihad.

=== Vasco da Gama ===
On 10 July 2026, Pedro Emanuel was announced as the new head coach of Campeonato Brasileiro Série A club Vasco da Gama on a contract until December 2027.

== Managerial statistics ==
As of match played 22 October 2026

Managerial record by team and tenure
Team	From	To	Record								Ref
Team	From	To	G	W	D	L	GF	GA	GD	Win %	Ref
Académica	14 June 2011	7 April 2013	80	22	23	35	92	109	−17	27.50	
Arouca	6 June 2013	25 May 2015	75	20	15	40	65	105	−40	26.67	
Apollon Limassol	9 June 2015	11 December 2016	67	36	20	11	122	61	+61	53.73	
Estoril	8 March 2017	21 October 2017	22	7	4	11	30	39	−9	31.82	
Al Taawoun	7 May 2018	22 May 2019	36	22	8	6	81	32	+49	61.11	
Almería	4 August 2019	4 November 2019	14	6	6	2	21	13	+8	42.86	
Al Ain	5 January 2020	5 June 2021	47	19	13	15	76	72	+4	40.43	
Al Nassr	1 October 2021	10 November 2021	5	1	1	3	7	6	+1	20.00	
Al-Khaleej	3 July 2022	23 June 2024	69	20	15	34	73	99	−26	28.99	
Al-Fayha	10 December 2024	21 May 2026	56	17	15	24	61	79	−18	30.36	
Vasco da Gama	10 July 2026	present	24	11	7	6	31	21	+10	45.83	
Career total			495	180	127	188	659	636	+23	36.36	—

== Honours ==
=== Player ===
Boavista

- Primeira Liga: 2000–01
- Taça de Portugal: 1996–97

Porto

- Primeira Liga: 2002–03, 2003–04, 2005–06, 2007–08, 2008–09
- Taça de Portugal: 2002–03, 2005–06, 2008–09
- Supertaça Cândido de Oliveira: 2003, 2004
- UEFA Champions League: 2003–04
- UEFA Cup: 2002–03
- Intercontinental Cup: 2004

=== Manager ===
Académica

- Taça de Portugal: 2011–12
- Supertaça Cândido de Oliveira runner-up: 2012

Apollon

- Cypriot Cup: 2015–16
- Cypriot Super Cup: 2016

Al Taawoun

- King's Cup: 2019

Individual

- Saudi Pro League Manager of the Month: January 2023
