= Fábio Luís =

Brazilian footballer (born 1983)

Personal information
- Full name: Fábio Luís Santos de Almeida
- Date of birth: 22 August 1983 (age 43)
- Place of birth: Porto Alegre, Brazil
- Height: 1.85 m (6 ft 1 in)
- Position: Forward

Senior career*
Years	Team	Apps	(Gls)
2006	Ipatinga		
2006–2007	São Caetano	8	(0)
2007	Santo André		
2008	São Caetano		
2008	Avaí		
2008	Paraná		
2009	Guaratinguetá	2	(1)
2009	Bragantino	4	(1)
2009	Ulsan Hyundai		
2010	Avaí		
2010	Botafogo-DF	5	(1)
2010	Santo André	5	(1)
2011	Porto Alegre	7	(2)
2011–2012	Académica de Coimbra	10	(0)
2013	São Carlos	13	(8)
2014	Treze	1	(0)
- * Club domestic league appearances and goals

Fábio Luís Santos de Almeida (born 22 August 1983), known as Fábio Luís, is a Brazilian former professional footballer who played as a forward.

== Career ==
former made his Primeira Liga debut for Académica de Coimbra on 26 September 2011 in a game against Feirense.

== Honours ==
Académica de Coimbra

- Taça de Portugal: 2011–12
