= Danilo Cintra =

Brazilian footballer (born 1985)

Personal information
- Full name: Danilo Gomes Cintra
- Date of birth: 28 May 1985 (age 41)
- Place of birth: São João da Barra, Brazil
- Height: 1.76 m (5 ft 9 in)
- Position: Midfielder

Senior career*
Years	Team	Apps	(Gls)
2006	CFZ do Rio		
2008	São João da Barra		
2010	Quissamã		
2010–2014	Macaé	29	(2)
2011–2012	→ Académica de Coimbra (loan)	27	(3)
2013	→ Chaves (loan)	4	(0)
2014	Icasa	8	(1)
2015	Atlético Itapemirim		
2016	Cabofriense	3	(0)
2016	Central	5	(0)
- * Club domestic league appearances and goals

Danilo Gomes Cintra (born 28 May 1985) is a Brazilian former professional footballer who played as a midfielder.

== Career ==
Cintra made his Primeira Liga debut for Académica de Coimbra on 15 August 2011 in a game against União de Leiria.

== Honours ==
Académica de Coimbra

- Taça de Portugal: 2011–12
