= Marques (footballer, born 1985) =

Brazilian footballer

Personal information
- Full name: Iorlando Pereira Marques Filho
- Date of birth: January 14, 1985 (age 41)
- Place of birth: Goiânia– GO, Brazil
- Height: 1.85 m (6 ft 1 in)
- Position: Striker

Team information
- Current team: URT

Youth career
- 2003: Vila Nova

Senior career*
| Years | Team | Apps | (Gls) |
| 2004–2006 | Avaí | | |
| 2006 | Vila Nova | | |
| 2007 | Mirassol | | |
| 2008 | Grêmio Inhumense | | |
| 2008–2009 | Leixões | | |
| 2009 | → Vizela (loan) | | |
| 2010 | Brasília | | |
| 2010 | Brasil de Pelotas | | |
| 2010 | Santo André | | |
| 2011 | América-SP | | |
| 2011–2012 | Boa Esporte | | |
| 2013 | Comercial | | |
| 2015 | Brasil de Farroupilha | | |
| 2016 | Pelotas | | |
| 2016 | Linense | | |
| 2017– | URT | | |
- * Club domestic league appearances and goals as of 11:38, 1 December 2008 (UTC)

Iorlando Pereira Marques Filho known as Marques (born January 14, 1985) is a Brazilian football striker.

Manager Carlos Brito brought Marques to Portuguese side Leixões in January 2008.
