= Lio (footballer, born 1987) =

Portuguese footballer

Personal information
- Full name: Leonel Cunha Guerra
- Date of birth: 20 June 1987 (age 39)
- Place of birth: Chaves, Portugal
- Height: 1.77 m (5 ft 10 in)
- Position: Midfielder

Team information
- Current team: Montalegre

Youth career
- 1998–2003: Flaviense
- 2003–2004: Chaves
- 2004–2006: Flaviense

Senior career*
Years	Team	Apps	(Gls)
2006–2007	GD Valpaços		
2007–2009	Vidago		
2009–2010	Sandweiler		
2010–2011	Chaves	0	(0)
2011–2012	Tirsense	29	(8)
2012–2015	Freamunde	79	(7)
2015–2017	Bragança	60	(12)
2017–2018	Gafanha	19	(3)
2018–	Montalegre	71	(6)
- * Club domestic league appearances and goals as of 1 August 2021

Leonel Cunha Guerra (born 20 June 1987), known as Lio, is a Portuguese football player who plays for Montalegre.

== Club career ==
He made his professional debut in the Segunda Liga for Freamunde on 12 August 2012 in a game against União da Madeira.
