= Carlos Eduardo (footballer, born 1989) =

Brazilian footballer

Personal information
- Full name: Carlos Eduardo de Oliveira Alves
- Date of birth: 17 October 1989 (age 37)
- Place of birth: Ribeirão Preto, Brazil
- Height: 1.84 m (6 ft 0 in)
- Position: Midfielder

Team information
- Current team: Mirassol
- Number: 33

Youth career
- 2006: São Bento
- 2007–2008: Desportivo Brasil
- 2007–2008: → São Bento (loan)

Senior career*
Years	Team	Apps	(Gls)
2009–2012	Desportivo Brasil	0	(0)
2009	→ Ituano (loan)	15	(0)
2009	→ Fluminense (loan)	9	(1)
2010	→ Grêmio Prudente (loan)	31	(0)
2011–2012	→ Estoril (loan)	37	(1)
2012–2013	Estoril	29	(4)
2013–2014	Porto B	10	(1)
2013–2015	Porto	17	(4)
2014–2015	→ Nice (loan)	30	(10)
2015–2020	Al Hilal	96	(54)
2020–2022	Shabab Al Ahli	32	(12)
2022	Al-Ahli	12	(5)
2022–2024	Botafogo	77	(15)
2025	Cruzeiro	38	(1)
2026–	Mirassol	20	(6)
- * Club domestic league appearances and goals as of 19 September 2026

Carlos Eduardo de Oliveira Alves (born 17 October 1989), known as Carlos Eduardo, is a Brazilian professional footballer who plays for Campeonato Brasileiro Série A club Mirassol as a midfielder.

== Club career ==
=== Early years and Estoril ===
Born in Ribeirão Preto, São Paulo, Carlos Eduardo played youth football for three clubs. He started his senior career with Desportivo Brasil, who loaned him several times for the duration of his contract; in the Série A, he represented Fluminense FC and Grêmio Prudente Futebol Ltda.

Carlos Eduardo moved to Portugal in January 2011, being loaned to G.D. Estoril Praia of the Segunda Liga. He contributed 23 matches and one goal in his first full season, to help his team win the league and return to the Primeira Liga after a seven-year absence.

Carlos Eduardo made his debut in the Portuguese top division on 17 August 2012, coming on as a 60th-minute substitute in a 2–1 away loss against S.C. Olhanense. He totalled nearly 1,600 minutes of action – notably scoring twice in a 4–0 home win over C.D. Nacional– during the campaign as the Lisbon club overachieved for a final fifth position and qualified for the UEFA Europa League.

=== Porto ===
On 22 May 2013, Carlos Eduardo signed a four-year contract with another Portuguese side, FC Porto, alternating between the main squad and the reserves in his first year. For 2014–15, he was loaned to France's OGC Nice.

Carlos Eduardo scored five times in Nice's 7–2 away rout of En Avant Guingamp on 26 October 2014, including a first-half hat-trick.

=== Al Hilal ===
In the summer of 2015, Carlos Eduardo joined Al Hilal SFC. In his very first appearance with the Saudi club, on 12 August 2015, he netted the only goal in a win against Al-Nassr FC in the Saudi Super Cup at Loftus Road. Late in the month, in two games separated by four days, he helped defeat Lekhwiya SC (4–1 home victory, in the AFC Champions League) and Al Fateh SC (2–1, away) by scoring a total of three times.

On 15 August 2017, Carlos Eduardo scored twice in a 4–3 home victory over Al Taawoun FC. On 24 November 2019, even though he did not take part in the final, the side claimed the Champions League after a 20-year wait.

=== Later career ===
Carlos Eduardo agreed to a three-year deal at Shabab Al Ahli Club of the UAE Pro League in late August 2020, on a free transfer. He returned to the Saudi Pro League on 11 January 2022, on a deal at Al-Ahli Saudi FC.

In July 2022, Carlos Eduardo agreed to a two-year contract at Botafogo FR. In his second season, he totalled 12 goals and seven assists in all competitions.

Carlos Eduardo subsequently remained in the Brazilian top tier, representing Cruzeiro EC and Mirassol Futebol Clube.

== Personal life ==
Carlos Eduardo married Stéphannie Oliveira (born 1991), daughter of fellow footballer Bebeto.

== Career statistics ==
As of match played 8 December 2024

Appearances and goals by club, season and competition
Club	Season	League			State league (Note: Includes Campeonato Paulista, Campeonato Carioca)		National cup (Note: Includes Taça de Portugal, King Cup, UAE President's Cup, Copa do Brasil)		League cup (Note: Includes Taça da Liga, Saudi Crown Prince Cup)		Continental		Other		Total	
Club	Season	Division	Apps	Goals	Apps	Goals	Apps	Goals	Apps	Goals	Apps	Goals	Apps	Goals	Apps	Goals
Ituano	2009	Paulista	—		15	0	—		—		—		—		15	0
Fluminense	2009	Série A	9	1	—		—		—		2 (Note: Appearances in Copa Sudamericana)	0	—		11	1
Grêmio Prudente	2010	Série A	15	0	16	0	—		—		1	0	—		32	0
Estoril	2010–11	Liga de Honra	14	0	—		0	0	1	0	—		—		15	0
Estoril	2011–12	Liga de Honra	23	1	—		3	1	7	2	—		—		33	4
Estoril	2012–13	Primeira Liga	29	4	—		1	0	5	0	—		—		35	4
Estoril	Total		66	5	—		4	1	13	2	—		—		83	8
Porto	2013–14	Primeira Liga	17	4	—		4	0	3	1	6 (Note: Appearances in UEFA Europa League)	0	0	0	30	5
Porto	2014–15	Primeira Liga	0	0	—		0	0	0	0	0	0	0	0	0	0
Porto	Total		17	4	—		4	0	3	1	6	0	0	0	30	5
Porto B	2013–14	Liga Portugal 2	10	1	—		—		—		—		—		10	1
Nice (loan)	2014–15	Ligue 1	30	10	—		0	0	0	0	—		—		30	10
Al Hilal	2015–16	Saudi Pro League	18	14	—		3	2	4	3	10 (Note: Appearances in AFC Champions League)	4	1 (Note: Appearance in Saudi Super Cup)	1	36	24
Al Hilal	2016–17	Saudi Pro League	22	12	—		3	1	2	0	8	4	0	0	35	17
Al Hilal	2017–18	Saudi Pro League	8	6	—		0	0	—		5	3	0	0	13	9
Al Hilal	2018–19	Saudi Pro League	26	10	—		3	1	—		6	1	10 (Note: One appearance and one goal in Saudi Super Cup, one appearance in Saudi-Egyptian Super Cup, eight appearances and three goals in Arab Club Champions Cup)	4	45	16
Al Hilal	2019–20	Saudi Pro League	22	12	—		3	2	—		0	0	3 (Note: Appearances in FIFA Club World Cup)	1	28	15
Al Hilal	Total		96	54	—		12	6	6	3	29	12	14	6	157	81
Shabab Al Ahli	2020–21	UAE Pro League	21	10	—		3	0	6	2	10	1	1 (Note: Appearance in UAE Super Cup)	0	41	13
Shabab Al Ahli	2021–22	UAE Pro League	11	2	—		0	0	1	0	0	0	1	0	13	2
Shabab Al Ahli	Total		33	12	—		3	0	7	2	10	1	2	0	55	15
Al-Ahli	2021–22	Saudi Pro League	12	5	—		1	0	0	0	—		—		13	5
Botafogo	2022	Série A	14	3	—		—		—		—		—		14	3
Botafogo	2023	Série A	34	6	3	1	4	3	—		8	2	—		49	12
Botafogo	2024	Série A	17	2	9	3	1	1	—		7 (Note: Appearances in Copa Libertadores)	2	—		34	8
Botafogo	Total		65	11	12	4	5	4	—		15	4	—		97	23
Career total			353	103	44	4	29	11	31	8	61	17	16	6	532	148

== Honours ==
Estoril

- Segunda Liga: 2011–12

Al Hilal

- Saudi Pro League: 2016–17, 2017–18, 2019–20
- King Cup: 2017
- Saudi Crown Prince Cup: 2015–16
- Saudi Super Cup: 2015, 2018
- AFC Champions League: 2019

Shabab Al Ahli

- UAE League Cup: 2020–21
- UAE Super Cup: 2020

Botafogo

- Campeonato Brasileiro Série A: 2024
- Taça Rio: 2023, 2024
- Copa Libertadores: 2024

Individual

- Saudi Pro League Player of the Month: October 2019
- FIFA Club World Cup Bronze Ball: 2019
