= Quality Sports Investments =

Chain of sports investment companies

Quality Sports Investments is a chain of companies dedicated to football investments. Through Quality Football Ireland, the company held footballer's contract rights. QSI also invited investors to buy their financial products: the economic rights in packs.

It was reported that Jorge Mendes and Peter Kenyon were behind the fund. It was also rumoured that FIFA was investigating the fund as third party ownership is actually not allowed and a possible conflict of interests of the agent Mendes and CAA.

Creative Artists Agency, the manager of the investment fund, had set up Quality Sports Investments LP (one) to Quality Sports V Investments LP (five), as well as Quality Sports Investments Fund Limited, Quality Sports Investments Fund GP Limited, Quality Sports Jersey GP Limited (one to five) in Jersey. In Ireland, there were three companies, namely Quality Football Ireland Limited, Quality Football Ireland III Limited and Quality Football IV Ireland Limited.

== Quality Football Ireland ==
Quality Football Ireland Designated Activity Company formerly known as Quality Football Ireland Limited (abb. QFIL) is a Republic of Ireland incorporated company.

As of 31 December 2011, QFIL was 70% owned by CAA Sports International LLC (CAA), CAA director O'Connor and Michael Levine (co-head of CAA Sports) held 15% each. QFIL borrowed money from Quality Sports Investments LP as asset-backed security and later Quality Sports II Investments LP (QSI II) to purchase the economic rights of the transfer fee receivables of the footballers (coined ERPA: Economic Rights Participation Agreement), made the company an intermediate holding company with €100 net equity (the original share capital), or a shell company. The companies were associated with Quality Sports Jersey GP Limited (QSI GP) and Quality Sports II Jersey GP Limited (QSI II GP). QSI GP and QSI II GP were 50% owned by CAA.

Unlike Portuguese football investment funds (which were regulated by Alternative Investment Fund Managers Directive 2011), the EPRAs was not treated as an intangible asset, and so there is no amortization nor write-down as a case of tangible asset. The fund even inserted clause in the EPRA, such that even if the player was released as a free agent, the fund would receive the original purchase price paid to the club, plus 10% interest p.a.. Beşiktaş used the word "factoring" to describe the company.

The company at first bought 5 players from 2 clubs in 2010, for €7.25 million, which was revealed later by Sporting and Beşiktaş's financial filing, and documents leaked by Football Leaks.

In 2011, the fund was restructured, the old EPRAs were treated as one asset valued €7.25 million (contributed to QSI I) and new loan from QSI II were treated as another, for €12.9 million. It was later revealed that it consisted of the 50% economic rights of Elias for a €3.85 million, 40% economic rights of Saúl Ñíguez for €1.5 million (according to Football Leaks) and €7.55 million for 4 other players.

Elias was bought by the fund on 15 September 2011. Sporting bought 100% rights from Atlético Madrid for €8.85 million 2 weeks ago, making the transaction to QSI uneconomical as the price was less than half of the purchase value. However, as FIFA set up a monitoring system for the flow of the transfer fees, ensuring that the transfer fee must to paid between clubs, the transaction may involved third parties ownership. Atlético Madrid may "buy" the rights from a third party owner, sell "100% rights" to Sporting, and as part of the deal Sporting had to then on-sell the rights entitled to the third parties. After the deal, Sporting effectively bought Elias 50% rights for €5 million. Elias already fully owned by the third parties and the player himself before leaving Brazil, and Corinthians only owned the rights to receive 20% of the player's additional value.

On 3 August 2011, Beşiktaş announced that the club was negotiating with QFIL for selling Necip Uysal, Atınç Nukan and Muhammed Demirci. On 27 August, Beşiktaş exposed the players involved in the negotiation was Hugo Almeida, which the club was trying to buy him back, and the three Turkish players were the bargaining-chip. In October and November Beşiktaş announced that there was no progress but the negotiation did not involve Ricardo Quaresma nor Mustafa Pektemek, as both players were 100% owned by the Turkish club.

| Date | Players | Clubs | Percentage | Cost (to fund) | Departed team | Departed date | Revenue (to fund) | Footnotes |
|---|---|---|---|---|---|---|---|---|
| 2010 | Marco Torsiglieri | Sporting (Portugal); (de facto Vélez) | 50% | €1.7M | Metalist (Ukraine) | 25 January 2012 | €1.7M + bonus €200,000 + interests €331,155 | Quality Sports Investments LP |
| 2010 | Hugo Almeida | Beşiktaş (Turkey); (de facto Werder Bremen) | 45% | €2M | Free agent | June 2014 | €2M + interest | Quality Sports Investments LP |
| 2010 | Eric Dier | Sporting (Portugal) | 50% | €1M | Sporting (Portugal) | February 2012 | €1M | Quality Sports Investments LP |
| 2010 | Tobias Figueiredo | Sporting (Portugal) | 50% | €1M | Sporting (Portugal) | 31 August 2016 | €1M | Quality Sports Investments LP |
| 2010 | A player | Sporting (Portugal) | | €1.55M | | | | Quality Sports Investments LP |
| 19 January 2011 | Elias | Sporting (Portugal); (de facto Atlético Madrid (Spain) ) | 50% | €3.85M | Corinthians (Brazil) | 7 April 2014 | | Quality Sports II Investments LP |
| 19 January 2011 | Saúl Ñíguez | Atlético Madrid (Spain) | 40% | €1.5M | | | | Quality Sports II Investments LP |
| 19 January 2011 | 3 Players | | | €5.55M | | | | Quality Sports II Investments LP |
| 19 January 2011 | A Player | | | €2M | | 19 August 2013 | €2M | Quality Sports II Investments LP |
| 24 January 2011 | A player | | | €2.5M | | 27 July 2011 | €4.68M + bonus €210,000 | Quality Sports Investments LP |
| February 2012 | Filipe Chaby | Sporting (Portugal) | 50% | €1M | Sporting (Portugal) | 31 August 2016 | €1M | Quality Sports Investments LP |

== Burnaby Investments ==
Burnaby Investments LP
- Formerly: Quality Sports III Investments LP
- Company type: limited partnership
- Industry: Sport investment
- Founded: 13 June 2011
- Headquarters: Saint Helier, Jersey
Owner
| Roman Abramovich (via Cetus Investments Ltd.) | (100% ordinary) |
| Burnaby GP | (general partner) |
- Subsidiaries: Burnaby Investments Ireland (via ABS contracts)

On 15 September 2011, Sporting announced that they had sold 50% economic rights of Ricky van Wolfswinkel to Quality Football Ireland III Limited for €2,537,500 alleged to equal to half of the price Sporting purchased (€5.075 million); however, Sporting actually announced the transfer fee they paid was €5.4 million in June 2011.

S.C. Braga revealed in its financial report that the signing of Juan Carlos for €2.5 million was financed by the fund, in which the fund acquired 90% contract rights for €2.5 million. Braga de facto allowed the fund to register the player as a "player" of Braga, as the non-dividable registration rights of a player must be held by a football club. Moreover, FIFA had set up a subsidiary, "FIFA Transfer Matching System gmbh", to track all the international transfers, which made the transfer fee impossible to pay to the fund directly; Braga was the entity to receive the transfer fee then re-distributed to the fund. In exchange, Braga received 10% future transfer fee. Juan Carlos subsequently left for Real Zaragoza.

The Burnaby fund earned revenue of €4.75 million after Sporting sold Wolfswinkel in March 2013.

In October 2012, it renamed to Burnaby Investments Ireland Limited (company number 498686) from Quality Football Ireland III Limited. In its 2011 audit report, the company disclosed that it signed four assets from two clubs with a total purchase of €9,787,500, with a €3,100,000 asset was bought back on 31 August 2011 for €2,895,000. If the information from Sporting and Braga aforementioned were true, the third fund acquired a fraction of the players right for €3.1 million probably from Sporting, 50% van Wolfswinkel for €2,537,500, a player probably from Sporting for €1,650,000, and Juan Carlos from Braga for €2.5 million.

The Irish company is financed by Quality Sports III Investments LP and Quality Sports III Jersey GP Limited, and both entities were renamed to Burnaby Investments LP and Burnaby GP Limited respectively in November 2012.

In 2014 The Guardian reported that Chelsea FC plc was the owner of Burnaby Investments LP, as shown in its annual report from 2011 to 2012 to 2013–14. During 2014–15 season Chelsea sold the shares in Burnaby Investments LP to Cetus Investments Limited for €9,855,769, which was a company also owned by Roman Abramovich, but independent from Chelsea.

In 2017 annual return of Burnaby GP Limited, the manager of the investment fund was owned by Gestifute (class B ordinary) and a US company "Venture Sports Limited" (class A ordinary).

| Date | Players | Clubs | Percentage | Cost (to fund) | Departed team | Departed date | Revenue (to fund) | Footnotes |
|---|---|---|---|---|---|---|---|---|
| 11 July 2011 | Ricky van Wolfswinkel | Sporting (Portugal) (de facto Utrecht) | 50% | €2,537,500 | Norwich (England) | 22 March 2013 | €4.75 million | Burnaby Investments LP |
| 2011 | Juan Carlos | Braga (Portugal) (de facto Real Madrid) | 90% | €2.5M | | | | Burnaby Investments LP |
| 2011 | A player | | | €1.65M | | | | Burnaby Investments LP |
| 2011 (29 March 2013) | A player | | | €3.1M | | 2014 | | Burnaby Investments LP |

== Quality Sports IV Investments ==
Quality Sports IV Investments LP
- Company type: limited partnership
- Industry: Sport investment
- Founded: 18 October 2011
- Headquarters: Saint Helier, Jersey
Owner
| unknown | (limited partner) |
| Quality Sports IV Jersey GP | (general partner) |
- Subsidiaries: Quality Football Ireland IV (via ABS contracts)

Quality Football Fund Ireland Limited (id: 498687) had acquired the economics rights of five players from two clubs on 20 October 2011 for €10 million and 1 thousand (later revealed one of the player (and club) was Eduardo Salvio of Atlético Madrid), as well as a lump sum option of €10 million to another club to purchase. On 11 November 2011, the fund acquired one additional player from one additional club for €318,750, matching the announcement of Sporting on selling Stijn Schaars.

The fund was renamed to Quality Football Ireland IV Limited in 2012 and later Quality Football Ireland IV Designated Activity Company in 2016.

In February 2012, the fund acquired three more players' economic rights for a total of €3,000,000 from two clubs, matching the announcement of Sporting for João Mário (20% for €400,000) and Cristian Ponde (25% for €100,000). Thus, the fund had a player asset totaling €13.3 million as of February 2012 financed by Quality Sports IV Investments LP of Jersey Island.

A leaked document also shown Atlético Madrid sold 30% economic rights of Koke to the fourth fund on 18 January 2013, for €3 million, as part of the deal to cancel a €5 million debt of the club to the fund related to Eduardo Salvio for €5 million on 31 July 2012.

| Date | Players | Clubs | Percentage | Price | Departed Team | Departed Date | Price | Footnotes |
|---|---|---|---|---|---|---|---|---|
| 20 October 2011 | Eduardo Salvio | Atlético Madrid | | €5 million | Benfica (Portugal) | 31 July 2012 | €5 million | |
| 20 October 2011 | 4 players | Atlético Madrid and/or 1 other club | | €5 million | | | | |
| 11 November 2011 | Stijn Schaars | Sporting | 37.5% | €318,750 | PSV (Netherlands) | 13 July 2013 | undisclosed | |
| 3 February 2012 | A player | A club (NOT Sporting) | | €2.5 million | | | | |
| 17 February 2012 | João Mário | Sporting | 25% | €400,000 | Internazionale (Italy) | 27 August 2016 | | |
| 17 February 2012 | Cristian Ponde | Sporting | 25% | €100,000 | in current squad | | | |
| 18 January 2013 | Koke | Atlético Madrid | 30% | €3 million | in current squad | | | |
| 18 January 2013 | A player | Atlético Madrid | 30% | €2 million | | | | |

== Other Sporting deals ==
The club also sold Fabian Rinaudo (50%, €1.1 million) and Diego Rubio (40%, €1.4 million) at the start of 2011–12 season. However, not specifying which fund.

== V Fund ==
Quality Sports V Investments LP (reg.no: 1492) and Quality Sports V Jersey GP Limited (reg.no: 110693) were established in mid-2012 (May and June), however the entity that held the contract rights which incorporated in low tax countries such as Ireland were still unknown.

== See also ==
- Third-party ownership in association football
