= Marinho (footballer, born 1983) =

Portuguese footballer

Personal information
- Full name: Mário Rui Correia Tomás
- Date of birth: 26 April 1983 (age 43)
- Place of birth: Lisbon, Portugal
- Height: 1.65 m (5 ft 5 in)
- Position: Winger

Youth career
- 1992–1994: Chelas
- 1994–2002: Sporting CP

Senior career*
Years	Team	Apps	(Gls)
2002	Sporting CP B	1	(0)
2002–2003	União Santiago		
2003–2004	Vilafranquense	36	(5)
2004–2006	Olivais Moscavide	59	(4)
2006–2007	Fátima	42	(13)
2008–2011	Naval	98	(10)
2011–2019	Académica	202	(21)
Total		438	(53)
- * Club domestic league appearances and goals

Mário Rui Correia Tomás (born 26 April 1983), known as Marinho, is a Portuguese former professional footballer who played as a winger.

He spent most of his career with Naval and Académica, totalling 209 Primeira Liga games and 23 goals between them and scoring the only goal as the latter won the Taça de Portugal in 2012. He added 103 appearances and 11 goals in LigaPro, for Académica and Fátima.

== Club career ==
After unsuccessfully emerging through Sporting CP's youth system, Lisbon-born Marinho went on to play in the lower leagues until 2006, with União Sport Clube, U.D. Vilafranquense and C.D. Olivais e Moscavide. In 2006 he signed with C.D. Fátima, scoring ten goals in 29 matches in his first season to help the club to promote to the Segunda Liga. Additionally, in the following campaign's Taça da Liga, he helped to a 2–1 shock win at former employers Sporting (albeit in an eventual 4–4 aggregate loss).

Courtesy of his solid performances, Marinho moved in January 2008 to the Primeira Liga with Associação Naval 1º de Maio, being cast into the starting XI in his first years but losing that status subsequently. On 10 April 2011, he netted his second goal of the season in a 2–1 home victory over S.L. Benfica, but the Figueira da Foz team eventually returned to the second tier after a six-year stay.

In late June 2011, Marinho signed a three-year contract with Académica de Coimbra in the same league, arriving on a free transfer. On 20 May of the following year, he scored against former club Sporting in the third minute of the final of the Taça de Portugal, the game's only as the Students won the tournament for the second time, the first in 73 years.

Marinho remained with Académica, agreeing to a new three-year deal in May 2014. Now captain, he extended it by a further year following their relegation in July 2016; he and João Real, another 2012 veteran, announced their retirement in July 2019 as new manager César Peixoto would not offer them new contracts.

== Career statistics ==
As of 7 October 2017

Club	Season	League		Cup		League Cup		Other (Note: Includes Supertaça Cândido de Oliveira and UEFA Europa League)		Total	
Club	Season	Apps	Goals	Apps	Goals	Apps	Goals	Apps	Goals	Apps	Goals
Sporting CP B	2001–02	1	0			—				1	0
União Santiago	2002–03					—					
Vilafranquense	2003–04	36	5	4	1	—				40	6
Olivais Moscavide	2004–05	34	1	2	0	—				36	1
Olivais Moscavide	2005–06	27	3	1	0	—				28	3
Olivais Moscavide	Total	61	4	3	0	—				64	4
Fátima	2006–07	29	10	1	0	—				30	10
Fátima	2007–08	13	3	2	0	5	1	—		20	4
Fátima	Total	42	13	3	0	5	1	—		51	14
Naval	2007–08	14	2	2	0	0	0	—		16	2
Naval	2008–09	30	5	3	4	1	1	—		34	10
Naval	2009–10	28	1	4	0	2	0	—		34	1
Naval	2010–11	26	2	1	0	3	0	—		30	2
Naval	Total	98	10	10	4	6	1	—		114	15
Académica	2011–12	26	3	7	4	1	0	—		34	7
Académica	2012–13	27	4	4	0	3	0	7	0	41	4
Académica	2013–14	27	1	3	0	2	0	—		32	1
Académica	2014–15	13	3	1	0	4	1	—		18	4
Académica	2015–16	18	2	3	1	0	0	—		21	3
Académica	2016–17	39	3	4	1	1	0	—		44	4
Académica	2017–18	5	0	0	0	1	0	—		6	0
Académica	Total	155	16	22	6	12	1	7	0	196	23
Career total		393	48	42	11	23	3	7	0	465	62

== Honours ==
Olivais e Moscavide

- Segunda Divisão: 2005–06

Fátima

- Segunda Divisão: 2006–07

Académica

- Taça de Portugal: 2011–12
- Supertaça Cândido de Oliveira runner-up: 2012

Individual

- Académica Player of the Year: 2012–13
- SJPF Segunda Liga Player of the Month: September 2007
