= Michel Simplício =

Brazilian footballer

Personal information
- Full name: Michel Simplício Rosseto
- Date of birth: 26 March 1986 (age 40)
- Place of birth: São Paulo, Brazil
- Height: 1.80 m (5 ft 11 in)
- Position: Forward

Youth career
- 2002: União Bandeirante
- 2003–2005: Figueirense

Senior career*
| Years | Team | Apps | (Gls) |
| 2006–2008 | Figueirense | 1 | (0) |
| 2007 | → Ponte Preta (loan) | 9 | (0) |
| 2008 | → Brasil Pelotas (loan) | | |
| 2008–2012 | Naval | 81 | (5) |
| 2012–2014 | Al Qadsia | ? | (5) |
| 2014–2015 | Al Khaleej | | |
- * Club domestic league appearances and goals as of 22 May 2015

Michel Simplício Rosseto (born 26 March 1986 in São Paulo) is a Brazilian professional footballer who plays as a forward.

== Honours ==
- Campeonato Catarinense: 2006
- Kuwait Emir Cup: 2013
