= Tiago Carneiro =

Portuguese footballer

Personal information
- Full name: Tiago Vieira Pinto Carneiro
- Date of birth: 12 August 1983 (age 43)
- Place of birth: Braga, Portugal
- Height: 1.81 m (5 ft 11 in)
- Position: Midfielder

Youth career
- 1994–2000: Braga
- 2000–2002: Gil Vicente

Senior career*
Years	Team	Apps	(Gls)
2002–2003	Joane		
2003–2004	Rio Ave	2	(0)
2005	Marco	8	(1)
2005–2006	Maia	8	(0)
2006–2007	Olympiakos Nicosia	23	(2)
2007	Merelinense	9	(0)
2008	APOP	12	(1)
2008	Olympiakos Nicosia		
2009	Louletano	7	(2)
2009–2010	Amares	28	(5)
2010–2011	Varzim	28	(2)
2011–2012	Moreirense	15	(0)
2012–2013	Tondela	22	(2)
2013–2014	Felgueiras 1932	31	(2)
2014–2016	Vilaverdense	59	(12)
2016–2017	Maria Fonte		
2017–2019	Caçadores Taipas	41	(6)
2019–2020	Os Sandinenses	18	(6)
- * Club domestic league appearances and goals as of 7 March 2020

Tiago Vieira Pinto Carneiro (born 12 August 1983 in Braga) is a Portuguese footballer who played as a midfielder.
