= Fabián Rinaudo =

Argentine footballer

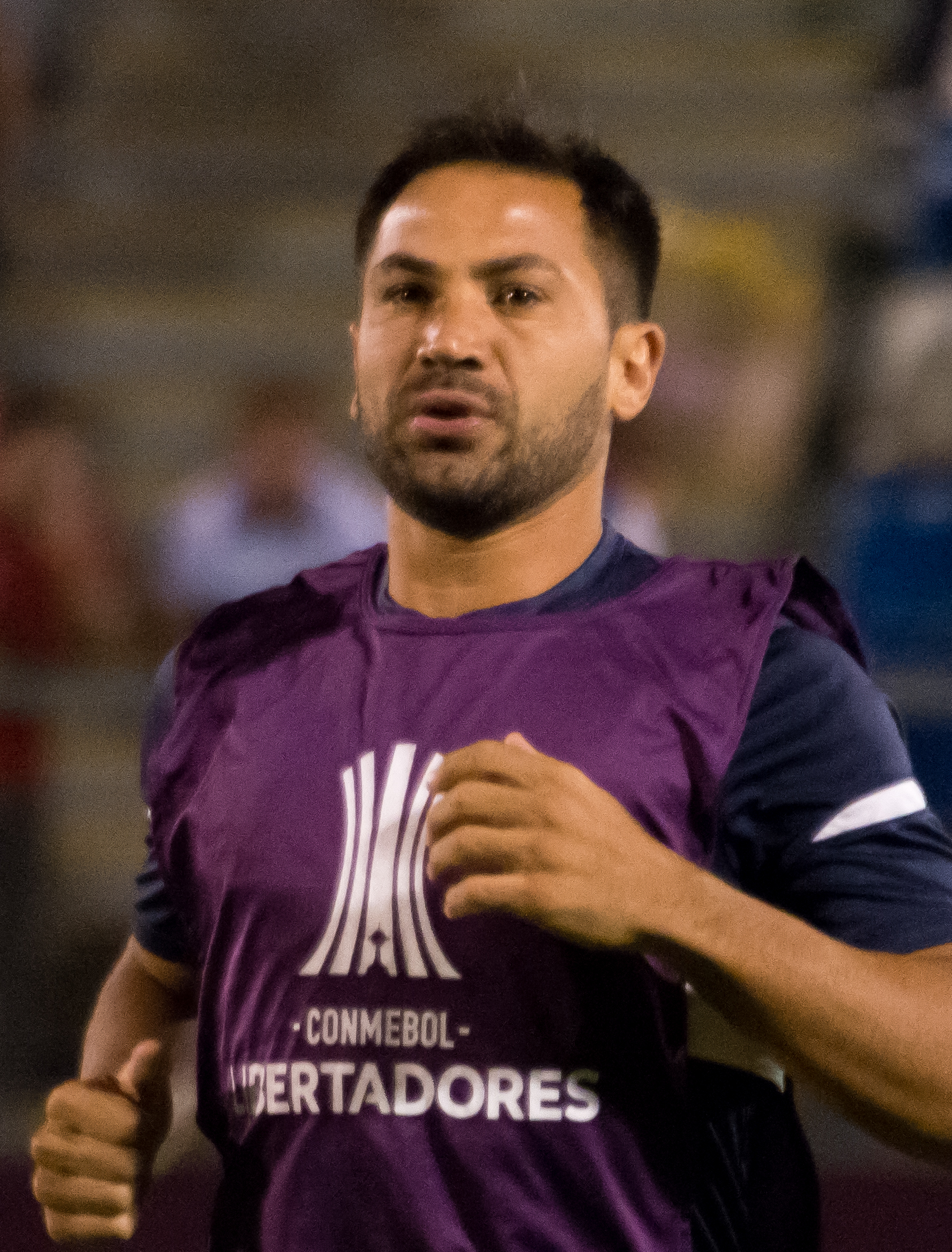
- Rinaudo in 2019

Personal information
- Full name: Fabián Andrés Rinaudo
- Date of birth: 15 May 1987 (age 39)
- Place of birth: Armstrong, Argentina
- Height: 1.74 m (5 ft 9 in)
- Position: Defensive midfielder

Youth career
- Gimnasia

Senior career*
Years	Team	Apps	(Gls)
2008–2011	Gimnasia LP	100	(1)
2011–2014	Sporting CP	36	(2)
2014	→ Catania (loan)	17	(0)
2014–2017	Catania	31	(2)
2015–2017	→ Gimnasia LP (loan)	38	(3)
2017–2018	Gimnasia LP	37	(0)
2019–2021	Rosario Central	45	(3)

International career
2009–2011	Argentina	4	(0)
- * Club domestic league appearances and goals as of 12:05, 24 April 2022 (UTC)

Fabián Andrés Rinaudo (born 15 May 1987 in Armstrong, Santa Fe) is an Argentinian former footballer who played as a midfielder. Rinaudo also holds an Italian passport, and sometimes played with the nickname Fito on his shirt.

== Club career ==
=== Gimnasia La Plata ===
He made his league debut for Gimnasia y Esgrima de La Plata in a 0–0 draw against River Plate on 5 October 2008. In the 2009-10 season he was awarded the prize for best player in the Torneo Apertura and second-best for the Torneo Clausura. He played 100 games for Gimnasia, his last one being a 1–1 draw against San Martín de San Juan, result that relegated Gimnasia to the Primera B Nacional.

=== Sporting Clube de Portugal ===
On 3 July 2011, Fito Rinaudo joined Portuguese club Sporting Clube de Portugal for an undisclosed fee, signing a four-year contract with a €25M minimum fee release clause. Sporting signed him in a leverage deal as the club later sold 15% economic rights to Sporting Portugal Fund for €525,000 and another 50% to Quality Sports Investments for €1.1 million. The club retained 35% economic rights on future transfer fee.

After Sporing sold the registration rights of Rinaudo to Catania, Sporting also paid €480,000 to Sporting Portugal Fund.

=== Calcio Catania ===
On 10 January 2014, he was loaned to Calcio Catania and made the move permanent later in July 2014 in a 3-year contract, for €1.6 million fee plus bonuses. Sporting would also receive 50% of the future transfer fee if Catania sold the player.

On 17 August 2015, Rinaudo was loaned back to Argentina for Gimnasia. The loan was renewed on 8 August 2016.

== International career ==
On 20 May 2009, Rinaudo made his international debut in a friendly match against Panama. The Argentine team, made up of players based in the Primera División Argentina won the game 3–1.
