= Ricky van Wolfswinkel =

Dutch footballer (born 1989)

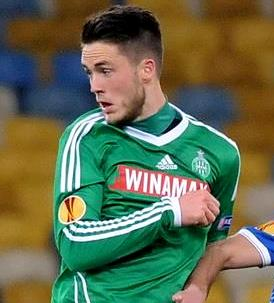
- Van Wolfswinkel playing for Saint-Étienne in 2014

Personal information
- Full name: Ricky van Wolfswinkel
- Date of birth: 27 January 1989 (age 37)
- Place of birth: Woudenberg, Netherlands
- Height: 1.83 m (6 ft 0 in)
- Position: Striker

Youth career
- 1998–1999: VV Woudenberg
- 1999–2008: Vitesse

Senior career*
Years	Team	Apps	(Gls)
2008–2009	Vitesse	33	(8)
2009–2011	Utrecht	64	(26)
2011–2013	Sporting CP	55	(28)
2013–2016	Norwich City	25	(1)
2014–2015	→ Saint-Étienne (loan)	28	(5)
2015–2016	→ Real Betis (loan)	16	(1)
2016–2017	Vitesse	32	(20)
2017–2021	Basel	88	(28)
2021–2026	Twente	159	(56)
2026–	VV Woudenberg	0	(0)

International career
2008	Netherlands U19	2	(0)
2009–2010	Netherlands U21	7	(3)
2010–2013	Netherlands	2	(0)
- * Club domestic league appearances and goals as of 17 May 2026

Ricky van Wolfswinkel (Dutch pronunciation: [ˈrɪki vɑɱ ˈʋɔl(ə)fsˌʋɪŋkəl]; born 27 January 1989) is a Dutch former professional footballer who played as a striker. He played top-flight football in the Netherlands, Portugal, England, France, Spain and Switzerland and was capped twice by the Netherlands national team.

== Club career ==
=== Vitesse ===
Van Wolfswinkel started his football career at the D-pupils of Vitesse Arnhem. In the A-juniors, he became top scorer in the national first division, winning a prize awarded by the Royal Dutch Football Association (KNVB) for the feat. This prize was presented by Wesley Sneijder in 2007. On 5 April 2008, Van Wolfswinkel made his debut for Vitesse's first team in a match against Sparta Rotterdam, in which he was the substitute in the 85th minute for Santi Kolk. Against De Graafschap, in the 2008–09 season, he was in the starting lineup for the first time. In his third match that season, against Sparta Rotterdam, he scored his first Eredivisie goal.

=== Utrecht ===
Van Wolfswinkel being interviewed following Utrecht's qualification for the Europa League

On 29 May 2009, Van Wolfswinkel announced his departure from Vitesse, subsequently signing a three-year contract with FC Utrecht. He began the 2010–11 league campaign with a goal in a 3–1 loss against Feyenoord. On 22 August 2010, he scored two goals against Willem II resulting in a 3–0 win for Utrecht. On 26 August 2010, Van Wolfswinkel scored a hat-trick against Celtic in the UEFA Europa League; Utrecht went on to win the match 4–0. On 3 October 2010, Van Wolfswinkel scored two penalties against Ajax to gain a 2–1 away win over the Dutch runners-up.

=== Sporting CP ===
On 3 June 2011, Van Wolfswinkel moved to Sporting CP, signing a five-year contract on a €5.4 million deal; Sporting CP was given financial aid by Sporting Portugal Fund and Quality Sports Investments. He scored his first goal for Sporting on 10 September 2011 against Paços de Ferreira in a 3–2 win. He was the SJPF Player of the Month for September 2011. Overall, he scored a total of 25 goals during the 2011–12 season, including a hat-trick in the final game, a 3–2 win over Braga at the Estádio José Alvalade on 12 May 2012.

In his second season in Lisbon, Van Wolfswinkel recorded another 14 league goals in 30 games, although his team missed out on European competition by finishing 7th. He scored a hat-trick, again in a 3–2 win over Braga, on 1 April 2013.

=== Norwich City ===
On 22 March 2013, it was announced that Van Wolfswinkel had agreed a deal to join English club Norwich City for the 2013–14 season, a transfer worth €10 million, plus up to €2 million in bonuses. He joined the Canaries on 1 July on a four-year deal. He stated that the famous Netherlands player Johan Neeskens had urged him to join Norwich, saying, "Ricky, you have to go. It's a great club for you. If you have a great feeling, do it."

He scored on his league debut on 17 August, in a 2–2 home draw for Norwich against Everton. After the match, he said in an interview that Manchester United and Netherlands international Robin van Persie also recommended Norwich to him. Van Persie was reported to have told Van Wolfswinkel that Norwich are "a difficult team to beat" and that the "crowd always get really behind them."

Van Wolfswinkel was involved in controversy in the 0–0 home draw against Cardiff City on 26 October 2013. After teammate Alexander Tettey was injured, Cardiff goalkeeper David Marshall sportingly put the ball out of play. Van Wolfswinkel quickly threw the ball to Leroy Fer, who kicked the ball into the goal. This caused outrage amongst the Cardiff players, who started shoving both Van Wolfswinkel and Fer. The goal was disallowed despite it not technically being a violation of any rules. In February 2014, he was alleged to have been kicked by Manchester City's Yaya Touré, who was investigated, and Van Wolfswinkel welcomed The FA's verdict that Touré had done no wrong.

Van Wolfswinkel failed to score for the remainder of the season, making 25 Premier League appearances in total, while Norwich were relegated to the Championship after finishing with only 33 points.

==== Loans ====
On 5 August 2014, Van Wolfswinkel joined Saint-Étienne of the French Ligue 1 on a season-long loan. He stated that his goal was to work hard for the team and to be important for the club. Van Wolfswinkel scored his first goal for the club on 25 September, the first goal in the 1–1 home draw against Bordeaux. On 30 November, he scored the second goal as the team won 3–0 in the Derby du Rhône against Lyon, his team's first home win over their rivals in 20 years.

Upon his return to Norwich from his loan spell at Saint-Étienne, he scored against Rotherham United in the League Cup second round on 25 August 2015, a 2–1 away win.

On 31 August 2015, Van Wolfswinkel joined Real Betis of the Spanish La Liga on a season-long loan. On 24 September, he made his first appearance in a 2–1 home defeat to Deportivo La Coruña, replacing Jorge Molina in the 59th minute. He scored his first two goals on 15 December in a Copa del Rey tie against Sporting Gijón, which finished as a 3–3 draw, and on 19 April 2016, he finally scored his first La Liga goal in a 1–0 home victory over Las Palmas.

=== Return to Vitesse ===
On 28 July 2016, Van Wolfswinkel rejoined Vitesse for an undisclosed fee from Norwich. On 6 August, he marked his comeback with a goal in the 21st minute to give Vitesse a 1–0 lead in an eventual 4–1 away victory over Willem II.

He ultimately scored 20 goals in 32 games for the league season, one behind Golden Boot winner Nicolai Jørgensen. This included a hat-trick on 8 April 2017 in a 4–2 win over Heerenveen at the GelreDome. He scored two goals in the final of the KNVB Beker against AZ on 30 April 2017 to lead the club to the title for the first time in its 125-year history.

=== Basel ===
On 14 June 2017, it was announced that van Wolfswinkel would join Swiss side Basel on a three-year deal. He joined Basel's first team for their 2017–18 season under head coach Raphaël Wicky. After playing in five test games van Wolfswinkel played his first team league debut for his new club on 22 July in the 2–0 away defeat against Young Boys in the Stade de Suisse. He scored his first goal for his new club in the next match in the 3–1 home win in the St. Jakob-Park against Luzern on 30 July. On 10 August, van Wolfswinkel scored twice as Basel beat Grasshoppers 3–2; his first double strike for the club meant that he scored four times in his first four league games for the club.

Van Wolfswinkel injured himself during the Champions League group stage home game against Benfica on 27 September. The game was won 5–0 and van Wolfswinkel had netted the third goal. However, the injury (a metatarsal fracture) meant that van Wolfswinkel could not play again in the first half of the season. He returned to the team after three months on 17 December in the 2–0 away win against Grasshoppers being substituted in five minutes from time.

Under trainer Marcel Koller Basel won the Swiss Cup in the 2018–19 season. In the first round Basel beat FC Montlingen 3–0, in the second round Echallens Région 7–2 and in the round of 16 Winterthur 1–0. In the quarter-finals Sion were defeated 4–2 after extra time and in the semi-finals Zürich were defeated 3–1. All these games were played away from home. The final was held on 19 May 2019 in the Stade de Suisse Wankdorf Bern against Thun. Striker Albian Ajeti scored the first goal, Fabian Frei the second for Basel, then Dejan Sorgić netted a goal for Thun, but the result remained 2–1 for Basel. Van Wolfswinkel played in five cup games and scored twice.

In August 2019, van Wolfswinkel underwent surgery for a brain aneurysm detected during a routine scan for concussion. After some complications and an injury in training, he returned to the squad in June the following year. His contract expired on 31 August 2020, but a week later, he signed for another two years. During their 2020–21 season under head coach Ciriaco Sforza made 25 league appearances, mainly as substitute. After the season van Wolfswinkel left the club. Between the years 2017 and 2020 he played a total of 148 games for Basel scoring a total of 54 goals. 88 of these games were in the Swiss Super League, 11 in the Swiss Cup, 16 in the UEFA competitions (Champions League and Europa League) and 33 were friendly games. He scored 28 goals in the domestic league, 4 in the cup, 6 in the European games and the other 16 were scored during the test games.

=== Twente ===
On 21 July 2021, Van Wolfswinkel signed a two-year contract with an option for a further season with Twente, returning to the Eredivisie. He scored on his competitive debut on 14 August, opening the scoring in a 2–1 league defeat away to Fortuna Sittard. He finished the 2021–22 campaign as Twente's leading scorer with 17 goals in 35 appearances, contributing to a fourth-place league finish and qualification for European play-offs.

On 27 March 2025, Van Wolfswinkel signed a one-year extension through 2026. He scored his 100th Eredivisie goal on 13 September 2025 against NAC Breda, becoming the 67th player to reach the milestone; per Opta, the span between his first and hundredth Eredivisie goals—16 years and 358 days—was the longest on record. On 6 May 2026, Twente announced that Van Wolfswinkel would be retiring from professional football at the end of the 2025–26 season. On 17 May 2026, Van Wolfswinkel played his last professional match against PSV.

== International career ==
Van Wolfswinkel played several matches for the Netherlands' national youth sides in various age groups and in August 2010 was called up for the senior national team for a friendly against Ukraine, during which he made his senior debut. He earned his second full international cap against Indonesia in June 2013.

== Career statistics ==
=== Club ===
Appearances and goals by club, season and competition
Club	Season	League			National cup (Note: Includes KNVB Cup, Taça de Portugal, FA Cup, Coupe de France, Copa del Rey, Swiss Cup)		League cup (Note: Includes Taça da Liga, EFL Cup, Coupe de la Ligue)		Europe		Other		Total	
Club	Season	Division	Apps	Goals	Apps	Goals	Apps	Goals	Apps	Goals	Apps	Goals	Apps	Goals
Vitesse	2007–08	Eredivisie	1	0	0	0	—		—		—		1	0
Vitesse	2008–09	Eredivisie	32	8	2	0	—		—		—		34	8
Vitesse	Total		33	8	2	0	—		—		—		35	8
Utrecht	2009–10	Eredivisie	31	7	1	1	—		—		4 (Note: Appearances in Eredivisie European play-offs)	4	36	12
Utrecht	2010–11	Eredivisie	29	15	3	0	—		12 (Note: Appearances in UEFA Europa League)	8	—		44	23
Utrecht	Total		60	22	4	1	—		12	8	4	4	80	35
Sporting CP	2011–12	Primeira Liga	25	14	7	5	2	0	13	6	—		46	25
Sporting CP	2012–13	Primeira Liga	30	14	1	1	3	2	7	3	—		40	20
Sporting CP	Total		55	28	8	6	5	2	20	9	—		86	45
Norwich City	2013–14	Premier League	25	1	2	0	0	0	—		—		27	1
Norwich City	2015–16	Premier League	0	0	0	0	1	1	—		—		1	1
Norwich City	Total		25	1	2	0	1	1	—		—		28	2
Saint-Étienne (loan)	2014–15	Ligue 1	28	5	4	3	2	0	6	1	—		40	9
Real Betis (loan)	2015–16	La Liga	16	1	3	2	—		—		—		19	3
Vitesse	2016–17	Eredivisie	32	20	5	3	—		—		—		37	23
Basel	2017–18	Swiss Super League	21	11	1	0	—		3 (Note: Appearances in UEFA Champions League)	1	—		24	12
Basel	2018–19	Swiss Super League	32	13	5	1	—		5	3	—		42	17
Basel	2019–20	Swiss Super League	10	2	3	2	—		5	2	—		18	6
Basel	2020–21	Swiss Super League	25	2	1	0	—		3	0	—		29	2
Basel	Total		88	28	10	3	—		16	6	—		114	37
Twente	2021–22	Eredivisie	32	16	3	1	—		—		—		35	17
Twente	2022–23	Eredivisie	38	9	2	0	—		4 (Note: Appearances in UEFA Europa Conference League)	0	—		44	10
Twente	2023–24	Eredivisie	32	16	1	0	—		6	0	—		39	16
Twente	2024–25	Eredivisie	26	7	2	1	—		12 (Note: Two appearances in UEFA Champions League, ten appearances and two goals in UEFA Europa League)	2	—		42	10
Twente	2025–26	Eredivisie	31	8	2	2	—		—		—		33	10
Twente	Total		159	56	10	4	—		22	2	—		192	63
Career total			496	169	51	23	8	3	75	27	4	4	622	218

=== International ===
Appearances and goals by national team and year
National team	Year	Apps	Goals
Netherlands	2010	1	0
Netherlands	2013	1	0
Total		2	0

== Honours ==
Sporting CP

- Taça de Portugal runner-up: 2011–12

Vitesse

- KNVB Cup: 2016–17

Basel

- Swiss Cup: 2018–19

Individual

- SJPF Player of the Month: September 2011
