= Wágner (footballer, born 1987) =

Brazilian footballer

Personal information
- Full name: Wágner de Andrade Borges
- Date of birth: 3 April 1987 (age 39)
- Place of birth: São José dos Campos, Brazil
- Height: 1.73 m (5 ft 8 in)
- Position: Forward

Team information
- Current team: Aliados Lordelo

Youth career
- Rio Claro

Senior career*
Years	Team	Apps	(Gls)
2006–2008	Rio Claro		
2009–2011	Aliados Lordelo	68	(23)
2011–2014	Moreirense	91	(11)
2014–2015	Zawisza Bydgoszcz	18	(3)
2015	Nacional	11	(1)
2015–2018	Tondela	58	(6)
2018	Thai Honda		
2018–2019	Paços Ferreira	24	(4)
2019–2020	Chaves	16	(3)
2020–2021	Penafiel	32	(4)
2021–2022	Vilafranquense	15	(3)
2022–	Aliados Lordelo	0	(0)
- * Club domestic league appearances and goals as of 16:36, 4 September 2022 (UTC)

Wágner de Andrade Borges (born 3 April 1987), known simply as Wágner, is a Brazilian professional footballer who plays for Portuguese club Aliados Lordelo as a forward.

== Honours ==
Moreirense

- Segunda Liga: 2013–14

Zawisza Bydgoszcz

- Polish Super Cup: 2014

Paços Ferreira

- Segunda Liga: 2018–19
