= Pintassilgo (footballer) =

Portuguese footballer

Personal information
- Full name: Carlos Pedro Carvalho Sousa
- Date of birth: 30 June 1985 (age 41)
- Place of birth: Felgueiras, Portugal
- Height: 1.68 m (5 ft 6 in)
- Position: Midfielder

Youth career
- 1995–2002: Felgueiras

Senior career*
Years	Team	Apps	(Gls)
2002–2005	Felgueiras	47	(2)
2005–2007	Vitória Guimarães	3	(0)
2006	→ Moreirense (loan)	12	(0)
2006–2007	→ Portimonense (loan)	27	(1)
2007–2008	Pandurii	2	(0)
2008–2013	Moreirense	121	(3)
2013–2016	Arouca	61	(4)
2016–2017	Covilhã	14	(1)
2017–2018	Varzim	25	(1)
2018–2020	Felgueiras 1932	35	(1)
Total		347	(13)
- * Club domestic league appearances and goals

Carlos Pedro Carvalho Sousa (born 30 June 1985 in Felgueiras, Porto District), known as Pintassilgo, is a Portuguese former professional footballer who played as a midfielder.
