= Luís Pinto (footballer, born 1982) =

Portuguese footballer (born 1982)

Personal information
- Full name: Luís Filipe Santos Pinto
- Date of birth: 12 June 1982 (age 44)
- Place of birth: Lisbon, Portugal
- Height: 1.70 m (5 ft 7 in)
- Position: Forward

Youth career
- 1992–1994: Benfica
- 1994–1995: Estrela Amadora
- 1997–1998: Águias Musgueira
- 1998–2001: Belenenses

Senior career*
Years	Team	Apps	(Gls)
2001	Estoril	9	(1)
2001–2002	Olivais Moscavide	17	(6)
2002–2005	Torreense	78	(16)
2005–2008	Mafra	74	(19)
2008	Chernomorets	0	(0)
2008–2010	União Madeira	60	(20)
2010–2012	Moreirense	48	(6)
2012–2013	Arouca	36	(7)
2013–2016	Chaves	102	(29)
2016–2017	Covilhã	19	(2)
2017	Torreense	8	(1)
2017–2019	Vilafranquense	66	(21)
2019–2021	Alverca	29	(8)
2021–2022	Atlético	18	(4)
Total		564	(140)
- * Club domestic league appearances and goals

Luís Filipe Santos Pinto (born 12 June 1982) is a Portuguese former professional footballer who played as a forward.

== Club career ==
Born in Lisbon, Pinto started out at G.D. Estoril Praia in the lower leagues, and only reached the Segunda Liga at the age of 28 after signing for Moreirense F.C. in the summer of 2010. He went to appear in 205 games in the competition over the course of seven seasons, scoring a total of 44 goals for that club, F.C. Arouca, G.D. Chaves and S.C. Covilhã.

In the 2015–16 campaign, Pinto netted five times in 31 appearances, helping Chaves to return to the Primeira Liga after 17 years. Late into the 2017 January transfer window, the 34-year-old returned to the third division and joined S.C.U. Torreense.
