= 2023–24 FC Twente season =

FC Twente
2023–24 season
- Chairman: Paul van der Kraan
- Head coach: Joseph Oosting
- Stadium: De Grolsch Veste
- Eredivisie: 3rd
- KNVB Cup: Second round
- UEFA Europa Conference League: Play-off round
- Top goalscorer: League: Sem Steijn (17); All: Sem Steijn (19)
- Average home league attendance: 29,685
- Biggest win: Twente 7–2 Volendam
- Biggest defeat: Fenerbahçe 5–1 Twente
Home colours

The 2023–24 season was FC Twente's 59th season in existence, and fifth consecutive in the Eredivisie. In addition to the domestic league, the club also competed in the KNVB Cup and the UEFA Europa Conference League.

== Players ==
=== First-team squad ===
As of 1 February 2024

Note: Flags indicate national team as defined under FIFA eligibility rules; some limited exceptions apply. Players may hold more than one non-FIFA nationality.

No.	Pos.	Nation	Player
1	GK	GER	Lars Unnerstall
2	DF	NED	Mees Hilgers
3	DF	NED	Robin Pröpper (captain)
4	MF	NOR	Mathias Kjølø
5	DF	NED	Gijs Smal
6	MF	NED	Carel Eiting
7	FW	NED	Mitchell van Bergen
8	MF	NED	Youri Regeer
9	FW	NED	Ricky van Wolfswinkel
10	FW	TUR	Naci Ünüvar (on loan from Ajax)
11	FW	NED	Daan Rots
12	DF	ISL	Alfons Sampsted
14	MF	NED	Sem Steijn

No.	Pos.	Nation	Player
16	GK	MAR	Issam El Maach
17	DF	BEL	Alec Van Hoorenbeeck (on loan from Mechelen)
18	MF	NED	Michel Vlap
19	MF	MAR	Younes Taha
20	DF	NED	Joshua Brenet
21	FW	NED	Myron Boadu (on loan from Monaco)
22	GK	POL	Przemysław Tytoń
23	MF	CZE	Michal Sadílek
24	DF	NED	Juliën Mesbahi
30	GK	NED	Sam Karssies
34	DF	NED	Anass Salah-Eddine
38	DF	NED	Max Bruns

== Transfers ==
=== In ===
Pos.	Player	Transferred from	Fee	Date	Source
MF	(Turkey) Naci Ünüvar	(Netherlands) Ajax	Loan	1 July 2023	
MF	(Netherlands) Youri Regeer	(Netherlands) Ajax	€900,000	1 July 2023	
MF	(Morocco) Younes Taha	(Netherlands) PEC Zwolle	Undisclosed	1 July 2023	
FW	(Costa Rica) Manfred Ugalde	(Belgium) Lommel	€4,000,000	1 July 2023	
DF	(Belgium) Alec Van Hoorenbeeck	(Belgium) Mechelen	Loan	15 August 2023	
FW	(Netherlands) Mitchell van Bergen	(France) Reims	Undisclosed	31 August 2023	
MF	(Netherlands) Carel Eiting	(Netherlands) FC Volendam	€1,000,000	1 September 2023	
FW	(Netherlands) Myron Boadu	AS Monaco	Loan	1 February 2024	

=== Out ===
Pos.	Player	Transferred to	Fee	Date	Source
FW	(Czech Republic) Václav Černý	(Germany) VfL Wolfsburg	€8,000,000	1 July 2023	
DF	(Spain) Julio Pleguezuelo	(England) Plymouth Argyle	Free	1 July 2023	
MF	(Algeria) Ramiz Zerrouki	(Netherlands) Feyenoord	€7,200,000	1 July 2023	
FW	(Costa Rica) Manfred Ugalde	(Russia) Spartak Moscow	€13,000,000	29 January 2024	

== Pre-season and friendlies ==
Win Draw Loss Fixtures

15 July 2023 Friendly	Twente (Netherlands)	7–1	(Denmark) OB	Enschede, Netherlands
15:00 UTC+2	Ugalde 1', 18'; Steijn 51'; Brenet 56'; Rots 60', 63' (pen.), 88'	Report	Kjerrumgaard 105'	Stadium: De Grolsch Veste; Attendance: 1,500; Referee: Alex Bos
Note: Two halves of 45 minutes and 60 minutes each.

19 July 2023 Friendly	PEC Zwolle (Netherlands)	2–3	(Netherlands) Twente	Hattem, Netherlands
14:00 UTC+2		Report		Stadium: Sportpark Het Achterveen; Referee: Luuk Timmers

22 July 2023 Friendly	Schalke 04 (Germany)	2–2	(Netherlands) Twente	Gelsenkirchen, Germany
13:30 UTC+2				Stadium: Veltins-Arena

30 July 2023 Friendly	Twente (Netherlands)	3–0	(Netherlands) Go Ahead Eagles
12:30 UTC+2

10 October 2023 Friendly	Union Saint-Gilloise (Belgium)	1–4	(Netherlands) Twente	Brussels, Belgium
19:00 UTC+2				Stadium: Stade Joseph Mariën

7 January 2024 Friendly	Eldense (Spain)	0–1	(Netherlands) Twente	Spain
12:30 UTC+2

8 January 2024 Friendly	Twente (Netherlands)	2–2	(Germany) VfL Osnabrück	Oliva, Spain
12:30 UTC+2				Stadium: Oliva Nova Golf & Beach Resort Campo 1

== Competitions ==
=== Overall record ===
Competition	First match	Last match	Starting round	Final position	Record							
Competition	First match	Last match	Starting round	Final position	Pld	W	D	L	GF	GA	GD	Win %
Eredivisie	13 August 2023	19 May 2024	Matchday 1	3rd	34	21	6	7	69	36	+33	61.76
KNVB Cup	17 January 2024		Second round	Second round	1	0	0	1	1	3	−2	0.00
UEFA Europa Conference League	27 July 2023	31 August 2023	Second qualifying round	Play-off round	6	3	1	2	8	7	+1	50.00
Total					41	24	7	10	78	46	+32	58.54

Source: Soccerway

=== Eredivisie ===
==== League table ====
Pos	Team	Pld	W	D	L	GF	GA	GD	Pts	Qualification or relegation
1	PSV Eindhoven (C)	34	29	4	1	111	21	+90	91	Qualification for the Champions League league stage
2	Feyenoord	34	26	6	2	92	26	+66	84	Qualification for the Champions League league stage
3	Twente	34	21	6	7	69	36	+33	69	Qualification for the Champions League third qualifying round
4	AZ	34	19	8	7	70	39	+31	65	Qualification for the Europa League league stage (Note: The 2023–24 KNVB Cup winners qualified for the Europa League league stage. Since the cup winners (Feyenoord) qualified based on league position, the Europa League spot was passed to the fourth-placed team.)
5	Ajax	34	15	11	8	74	61	+13	56	Qualification for the Europa League second qualifying round

Source: Eredivisie
Rules for classification: Season in progress: 1) Most points won; 2) Less points lost; 3) Goal difference; 4) Goals scored; 5) Alphabetical order; End of season: 1) Points; 2) Goal difference; 3) Goals scored; 4) Head-to-head points; 5) Head-to-head goal difference; 6) Head-to-head away goals scored; 7) Play-off if relevant for deciding champion, relegation or participating in a European league, otherwise by draw. 8) Penalty shoot-out (only after a play-off)
(C) Champions

==== Results summary ====
Overall								Home						Away					
Pld	W	D	L	GF	GA	GD	Pts	W	D	L	GF	GA	GD	W	D	L	GF	GA	GD
25	16	5	4	49	24	+25	53	10	1	2	27	14	+13	6	4	2	22	10	+12

Last updated: 9 March 2024.
Source: Worldfootball

==== Results by round ====
Round	1	2	3	4	5	6	7	8	9	10	11	12	13	14	15	16	17	18	19	20	21	22	23	24	25	26	27	28	29	30	31	32	33	34
Ground	A	H	H	A	H	A	H	A	A	H	A	H	H	A	H	A	H	A	H	H	A	H	H	A	H	A	H	A	H	A	H	A	H	A
Result	W	W	W	W	W	L	W	W	D	W	D	D	L	W	W	D	W	L	D	W	W	L	W	W	W	L	W	D	W	L	W	L	W	W
Position	2	2	2	2	2	3	3	3	4	3	4	3	4	4	4	3	3	3	3	3	3	3	3	3	3	3	3	3	3	3	3	3	3	3

Updated to match(es) played on 9 March 2024. Source: Worldfootball
A = Away; H = Home; W = Win; D = Draw; L = Loss

==== Matches ====
The league fixtures were unveiled on 30 June 2023.

13 August 2023 1	Almere	1–4	Twente	Almere
16:45 UTC+2	Floranus (yellow card) 27'; Van Bruggen (yellow card) 32' (yellow-red card) 74'; Esajas (yellow card) 69'; Post 72'	Report	Pröpper 59'; Vlap 66'; Van Wolfswinkel 90+2', 90+4'	Stadium: Yanmar Stadion; Attendance: 3,616; Referee: Jochem Kamphuis

20 August 2023 2	Twente	3–1	PEC Zwolle	Enschede
14:30 UTC+2	Sadílek 18'; Unnerstall (yellow card) 31'; Hilgers (yellow card) 52'; Steijn 76'; Schendelaar 90+4' (o.g.)	Report	Van Hintum (yellow card) 26'; Druijf 33' (pen.); Reijnders (yellow card) 35'; Lam (yellow card) 42'; Van Polen (yellow card) 53'; Kersten (yellow card) 90+7'	Stadium: De Grolsch Veste; Attendance: 29,000; Referee: Serdar Gözübüyük

3 September 2023 4	Volendam	0–2	Twente	Volendam
14:30 CEST (UTC+2)	Benamar (yellow card) 75'; Backhaus (yellow card) 76'	Report	Steijn 36'; Kjølø (yellow card) 41'; Rots (yellow card) 74'; Van Wolfswinkel 79'	Stadium: Kras Stadion; Attendance: 6,600; Referee: Richard Martens

17 September 2023 5	Twente	3–1	Ajax	Enschede
14:30 CEST (UTC+2)	Rots 7'; Steijn 11'; Sadílek (yellow card) 74'; Ünüvar 79'	Report	Bergwijn (yellow card) 13'; Brobbey 35'; Hato (yellow card) 82'	Stadium: De Grolsch Veste; Attendance: 30,000; Referee: Danny Makkelie

24 September 2023 6	RKC Waalwijk	1–0	Twente	Waalwijk
16:45 CEST (UTC+2)	Stevanović 89'	Report		Stadium: Mandemakers Stadion; Referee: Joey Kooij

27 September 2023 3	Twente	1–0	Vitesse	Enschede
20:00 CEST (UTC+2)	Steijn 39'	Report		Stadium: De Grolsch Veste; Referee: Jannick van der Laan
Note: Postponed due to European competitions.

30 September 2023 7	Twente	1–0	Heerenveen	Enschede
21:00 CEST (UTC+2)	Vlap 65'	Report		Stadium: De Grolsch Veste; Referee: Rob Dieperink

8 October 2023 8	Fortuna Sittard	0–3	Twente	Sittard
14:30 CEST (UTC+2)		Report	Ugalde 15'; Regeer 47'; Van Wolfswinkel 88'	Stadium: Fortuna Sittard Stadion; Referee: Martin van den Kerkhof

22 October 2023 9	Heracles Almelo	2–2	Twente	Almelo
14:30 CEST (UTC+2)	Engels 69'; Sonnenberg 88'	Report	Rots 11'; Steijn 32'	Stadium: Erve Asito; Referee: Pol van Boekel

29 October 2023 10	Twente	2–1	Feyenoord	Enschede
12:15 CET (UTC+1)	Ugalde 10'; Van Wolfswinkel 78'	Report	Geertruida 86'	Stadium: De Grolsch Veste; Referee: Dennis Higler

5 November 2023 11	Utrecht	1–1	Twente	Utrecht
12:15 CET (UTC+1)	Fraulo 23'; Flamingo (yellow card) 30'; Van der Hoorn (yellow card) 35'; Azarkan (yellow card) 41'	Report	Steijn 31' (pen.); Ugalde (yellow card) 45+3'; Sadílek (yellow card) 45+6' (yellow-red card) 66'; Hilgers (yellow card) 90+3'	Stadium: Stadion Galgenwaard; Attendance: 17,491; Referee: Serdar Gözübüyük

11 November 2023 12	Twente	3–3	NEC	Enschede
20:00 CET (UTC+1)		Report		Stadium: De Grolsch Veste

25 November 2023 13	Twente	0–3	PSV	Enschede
18:45 CET (UTC+1)	Hilgers (red card) 25'; Pröpper (yellow card) 90+4'	Report	Veerman 45+1'; Pröpper 49' (o.g.); Schouten (yellow card) 52'; Bakayoko (yellow card) 80', (goal) 82'	Stadium: De Grolsch Veste; Attendance: 30,000; Referee: Allard Lindhout

3 December 2023 14	Go Ahead Eagles	1–3	Twente	Deventer
14:30 CET (UTC+1)	Kuipers (yellow card) 62'; Llansana 71'	Report	Ugalde 1'; Steijn 24'; Taha 76'	Stadium: De Adelaarshorst; Attendance: 9,820; Referee: Sander van der Eijk

8 December 2023 15	Twente	4–2	Excelsior	Enschede
20:00 CET (UTC+1)	Ugalde 45'; van Wolfswinkel 59', 80'; Smal (yellow card) 67'; Pröpper (yellow card) 77'; Taha 85'	Report	Parrott 9'; Nieuwpoort 13'; Naujoks (yellow card) 24'; Zagré (red card) 24'; Driouech (yellow card) 26'; Horemans (yellow card) 57'; Nieuwpoort (yellow card) 59'	Stadium: De Grolsch Veste; Referee: Ingmar Oostrom

17 December 2023 16	Sparta Rotterdam	2–2	Twente	Rotterdam
13:30 CET (UTC+1)	de Guzmán (yellow card) 35'; Bakari (red card) 45+4'; Lauritsen 51'; Lauritsen 55'; Velthuis (yellow card) 72'	Report	Steijn 45+5'; Sadílek (yellow card) 53'; Ünüvar 90+2'	Stadium: Sparta Stadion Het Kasteel; Referee: Martin van den Kerkhof

13 January 2024 17	Twente	2–1	AZ	Enschede
18:45 CET (UTC+1)	Ugalde 42', 70'	Report	Odgaard 4'	Stadium: De Grolsch Veste; Referee: Serdar Gözübüyük

20 January 2024 18	NEC	1–0	Twente	Breda
15:30 CET (UTC+1)	Verdonk 49'	Report	Bruns (red card) 53'; Van Hoorenbeeck (yellow card) 69'	Stadium: Goffert Stadium; Referee: Martin van den Kerkhof

28 January 2024 19	Feyenoord	0–0	Twente	Rotterdam
13:30 CET (UTC+1)	Giménez (penalty missed) 47'	Report	van Wolfswinkel (yellow card) 90'	Stadium: De Kuip; Referee: Allard Lindhout

3 February 2024 20	Twente	3–0	RKC Waalwijk	Enschede
16:30 CET (UTC+1)	Van Wolfswinkel 21'; Boadu 79'; Taha 81'	Report	Seuntjens (yellow card) 40'	Stadium: De Grolsch Veste; Referee: Sander van der Eijk

10 February 2024 21	Excelsior	0–3	Twente	Rotterdam
18:45 CET (UTC+1)	Sandra (yellow card) 53'	Report	Rots 2'; Van Wolfswinkel 5', 13'; Brenet (yellow card) 90'	Stadium: Van Donge & De Roo Stadion; Referee: Rob Dieperink

18 February 2024 22	Twente	0–1	Utrecht	Enschede
12:15 CET (UTC+1)		Report	Toornstra 29'	Stadium: De Grolsch Veste; Referee: Marc Nagtegaal

25 February 2024 23	Twente	3–0	Go Ahead Eagles	Enschede
14:30 CET (UTC+1)	Steijn 12', 36'; Brenet 60'	Report		Stadium: De Grolsch Veste; Referee: Jannick van der Laan

2 March 2024 24	Vitesse	1–2	Twente	Arnhem
20:00 CET (UTC+1)	Pröpper 44' (o.g.)	Report	Van Wolfswinkel 4'; Brenet 79'	Stadium: GelreDome; Referee: Ingmar Oostrom

9 March 2024 25	Twente	2–1	Sparta Rotterdam	Enschede
18:45 CET (UTC+1)	Rots 21'; Boadu 77'	Report	Clement 87'	Stadium: De Grolsch Veste; Referee: Rob Dieperink

17 March 2024 26	PSV	1–0	Twente	Eindhoven
20:00 CET (UTC+1)	Pepi 90+6'	Report		Stadium: Philips Stadion; Attendance: 34,800; Referee: Joey Kooij

31 March 2024 27	Twente	1–0	Heracles Almelo	Enschede
14:30	Boadu 54'			Stadium: De Grolsch Veste; Attendance: 30,000

3 April 2024 28	Heerenveen	3–3	FC Twente	Heerenveen
21:00	Ion Nicolaescu 21'; Osame Sahraoui 38'; Thom Haye 57' (pen.)	Report	Ricky van Wolfswinkel 11'; Daan Rots 13'; Robin Pröpper 36'	Stadium: Abe Lenstra Stadion; Attendance: 20,954; Referee: Alex Bos

6 April 2024 29	Twente	2–0	Fortuna Sittard	Enschede
21:00	Fofana 52' (o.g.); Van Wolfswinkel 86'		Guth (yellow card) 14' (yellow-red card) 35'	Stadium: De Grolsch Veste; Referee: Rob Dieperink

14 April 2024 30	Ajax	2–1	FC Twente	Amsterdam
16:45	Šutalo (yellow card) 5'; Mannsverk (yellow card) 35'; Brobbey 59'; Bergwijn 81' (pen.)	Report	Van Wolfswinkel 31'; Kjølø (yellow card) 32'	Stadium: Johan Cruyff Arena; Attendance: 53,718; Referee: Serdar Gözübüyük

24 April 2024 31	Twente	3–1	Almere	Enschede
18:45	Kjølø 10'; Regeer (yellow card) 19'; Steijk 52'; Rots 84'	Report	Akujobi (yellow card) 29'; Hansen 73'	Stadium: De Grolsch Veste; Referee: Ingmar Oostrom

5 May 2024 32	AZ	2–1	Twente	Alkmaar
16:45	Van Bommel 46'; Pavlidis 66'		Steijn 5'	Stadium: AFAS Stadion; Referee: Danny Makkelie

12 May 2024 33	Twente	7–2	Volendam	Enschede
14:30	Van Wolfswinkel 9'; Ünüvar 23'; Pröpper 37'; Regeer 40'; Steijn 43', 69', 73'		Mirani 4', 21'	Stadium: De Grolsch Veste; Referee: Allard Lindhout

19 May 2024 34	PEC Zwolle	1–2	Twente	Zwolle
14:30	García MacNulty 62'		Rots 59'; Van Wolfswinkel 80' (pen.)	Stadium: MAC³PARK Stadion; Referee: Dennis Higler

=== KNVB Cup ===
17 January 2024 Second round	PSV	3–1	Twente	Eindhoven
21:00 CET	Vertessen 19'; De Jong 55'; Bakayoko 61'	Report	Ugalde 68'	Stadium: Philips Stadion; Attendance: 34,400; Referee: Jeroen Manschot

=== UEFA Europa Conference League ===
==== Second qualifying round ====
The draw for the second qualifying round was made on 21 June 2023.

27 July 2023 First leg	Twente (Netherlands)	1–0	(Sweden) Hammarby IF	Enschede
20:00	Steijn 53'	Report		Stadium: De Grolsch Veste; Attendance: 29,500; Referee: John Brooks (England)

3 August 2023 Second leg	Hammarby IF (Sweden)	1–1 (a.e.t.) (1–2 agg.)	(Netherlands) Twente	Stockholm, Sweden
20:00	Erabi 38'	Report	Steijn 115'	Stadium: Tele2 Arena; Attendance: 24,542; Referee: Manfredas Lukjančukas (Lithuania)

==== Third qualifying round ====
10 August 2023 First leg	Twente (Netherlands)	2–0	(Latvia) Riga	Enschede
20:00	Sampsted 11'; Rots 67'	Report		Stadium: De Grolsch Veste; Attendance: 26,000; Referee: Robert Schröder (Germany)

17 August 2023 Second leg	Riga (Latvia)	0–3 (0–5 agg.)	(Netherlands) Twente	Riga, Latvia
19:00 (20:00 EEST)		Report	Rots 57'; Besselink 90'; Ünüvar 90+2'	Stadium: Skonto Stadium; Attendance: 6,324; Referee: Chrysovalantis Theouli (Cyprus)

==== Play-off round ====
24 August 2023 First leg	Fenerbahçe (Turkey)	5–1	(Netherlands) Twente	Istanbul, Turkey
19:00 (20:00 TRT)	Oosterwolde 33'; Szymański 60'; Kahveci 63', 74'; Tadić 90+3' (pen.)	Report	Ugalde 20'	Stadium: Şükrü Saracoğlu Stadium; Attendance: 38,961; Referee: Andrew Madley (England)

31 August 2023 Second leg	Twente (Netherlands)	0–1 (1–6 agg.)	(Turkey) Fenerbahçe	Enschede
19:00		Report	Džeko 72' (pen.)	Stadium: De Grolsch Veste; Attendance: 22,500; Referee: Fabio Maresca (Italy)
