= Gijs Besselink =

Dutch football player

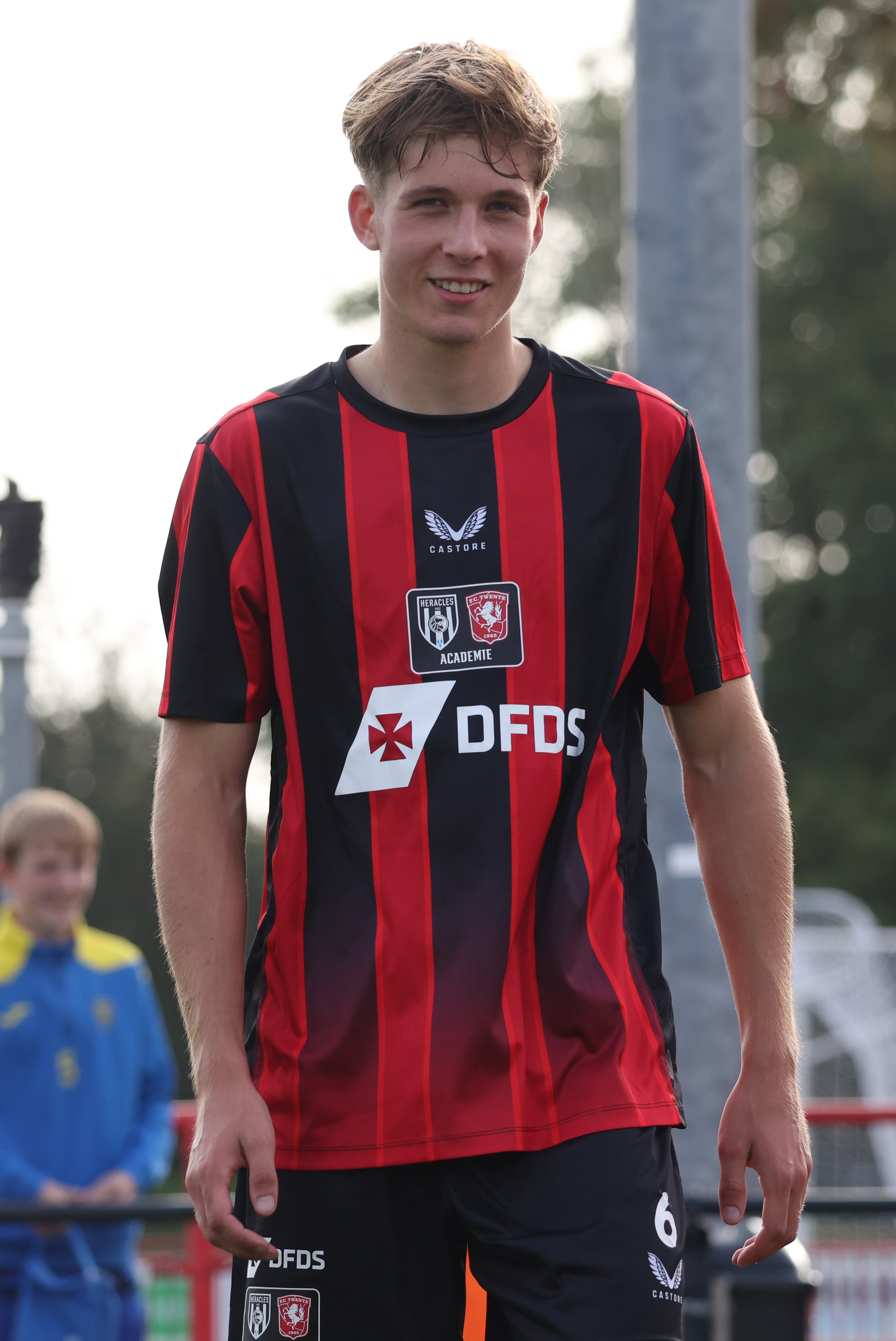

Personal information
- Date of birth: 16 June 2004 (age 22)
- Place of birth: Heeten, Netherlands
- Height: 1.80 m (5 ft 11 in)
- Position: Midfielder

Team information
- Current team: FC Twente
- Number: 41

Youth career
- 2013: SV Heeten
- 2013–2023: FC Twente / Heracles Academy

Senior career*
Years	Team	Apps	(Gls)
2023–	FC Twente	22	(0)
2025–2026	→ Willem II (loan)	36	(1)
- * Club domestic league appearances and goals as of 28 April 2026

Gijs Besselink (born 16 June 2004), is a Dutch footballer who plays as a midfielder for Eredivisie club FC Twente.

== Career ==
Besselink started playing football at SV Heeten in 2013, he made the switch to the FC Twente / Heracles Academy where he completed the entire youth training. In the 2022/23 season Besselink played with the under 18 and under 21 teams, he was also allowed to join the match selection of the first team of FC Twente several times.

In 2023, Besselink was allowed to join the first team for a training week, where he signed a contract until 2025 on 14 July 2023, with an option for another season. Since then, Besselink has played for FC Twente under 21.

On 10 August 2023, Besselink made his debut for FC Twente, in the first qualifying match at home against Riga FC in the 3rd preliminary round for the 2023–24 UEFA Europa Conference League, he came on the field in the 83rd minute for Ricky van Wolfswinkel. A week later, on August 17, in the return match, he came on for Youri Regeer in the 80th minute, where he scored his first goal for FC Twente in the 90th minute. Later, Besselink played in both knockout stage matches against Fenerbahçe S.K.

At the end of September 2023, Besselink was added to the selection of the FC Twente first team. His Eredivisie debut followed on 3 September 2023 in against FC Volendam, coming on for Michel Vlap in the 82nd minute.

On 14 August 2025, Besselink was loaned by Willem II.

== Career statistics ==
As of match played 22 May 2025

Appearances and goals by club, season and competition
Club	Season	League			Cup		Europe		Other		Total	
Club	Season	Division	Apps	Goals	Apps	Goals	Apps	Goals	Apps	Goals	Apps	Goals
Twente	2023–24	Eredivisie	8	0	0	0	4 (Note: Appearances in UEFA Conference League)	1	—		12	1
Twente	2024–25	Eredivisie	14	0	0	0	7 (Note: One appearance in UEFA Champions League, six appearances in UEFA Europa League)	0	—		21	0
Career total			22	0	0	0	11	1	0	0	33	1
