= Mees Hilgers =

Indonesian footballer (born 2001)

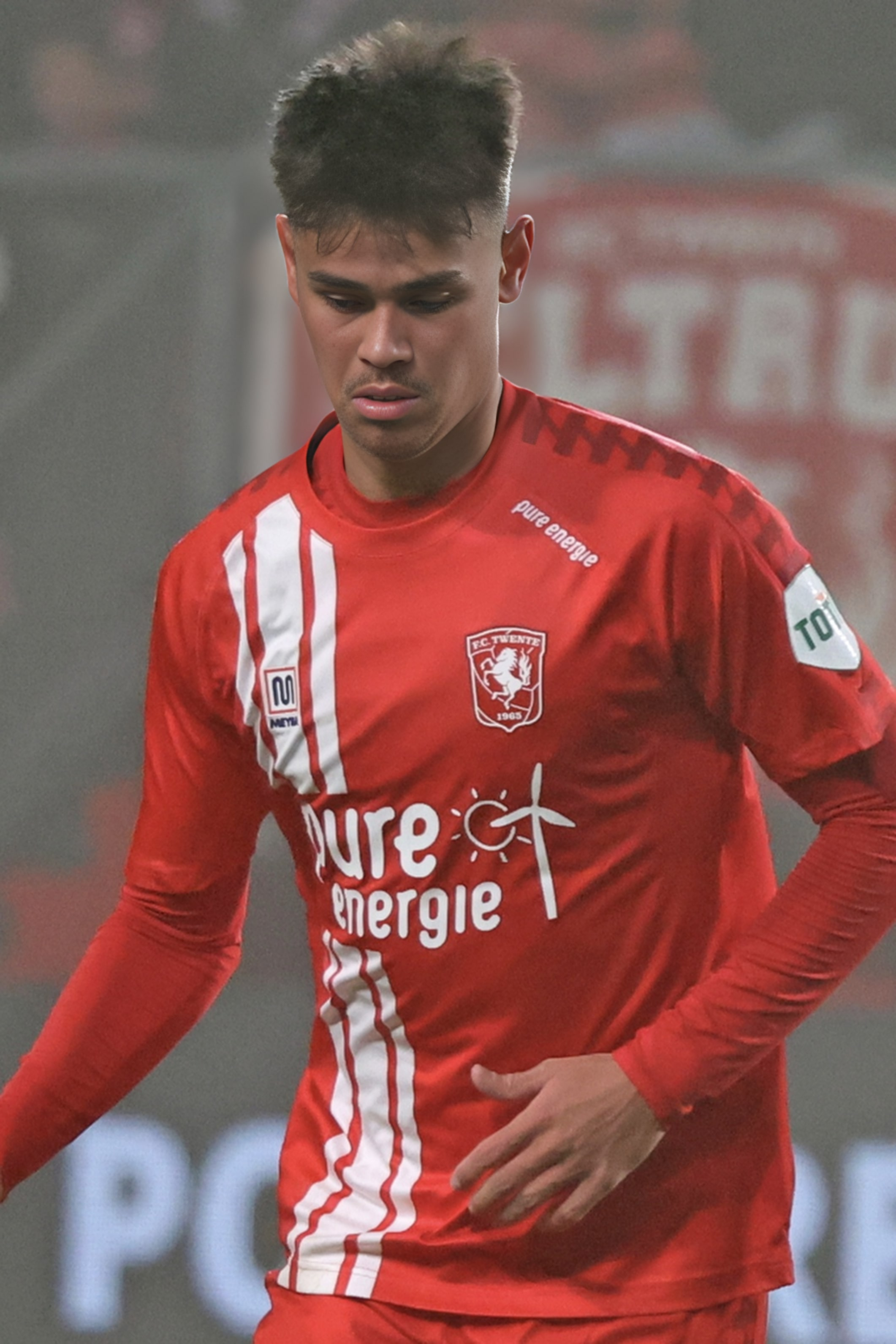
- Hilgers playing for Twente in 2022

Personal information
- Full name: Mees Victor Joseph Hilgers
- Date of birth: 13 May 2001 (age 25)
- Place of birth: Amersfoort, Netherlands
- Height: 1.85 m (6 ft 1 in)
- Position: Centre-back

Team information
- Current team: Heerenveen
- Number: 2

Youth career
- 2005–2009: Nieuwland
- 2009–2011: Sparta Nijkerk
- 2011–2020: Twente

Senior career*
| Years | Team | Apps | (Gls) |
| 2020–2026 | Twente | 108 | (3) |
| 2026– | Heerenveen | 2 | (0) |

International career^{‡}
| 2022 | Netherlands U21 | 1 | (0) |
| 2024– | Indonesia | 4 | (0) |
- * Club domestic league appearances and goals as of 21 November 2026 ‡ National team caps and goals as of 10 June 2025

Mees Victor Joseph Hilgers (born 13 May 2001) is a professional footballer who plays as a centre-back for Eredivisie club Heerenveen. Born in the Netherlands, he represents the Indonesia national team.

== Club career ==
=== Early career ===
Hilgers started playing football at Nieuwland in his hometown of Amersfoort. After moving to Nijkerk, he played in the youth team of Sparta Nijkerk. At the age of ten, he moved to the academy of Twente.

=== Twente ===
On 6 December 2018, Hilgers signed his first professional contract with Twente. He made his professional debut with Twente in a 2–1 Eredivisie win over Ajax on 5 December 2020.

==== 2022–23 season ====
In the 2022–23 season, Hilgers was out of action for some time from March due to a groin injury. After returning he lost his starting place to Julio Pleguezuelo. He seemed to be heading for a departure from Twente, but he signed a new contract in July 2023 until mid-2026.

==== 2024–25 season ====
On 13 August 2024, Hilgers scored a goal against Red Bull Salzburg in the second leg of UEFA Champions League Third qualifying round in a 3–3 draw, but Twente lost 4–5 on aggregate.

On 25 September 2024, Hilgers started and played the full 90 minutes against Manchester United at Old Trafford in a 1–1 draw in the 2024–25 UEFA Europa League league stage. He also played the following match, a 1–1 draw against Fenerbahçe at home, where he became the first Indonesian to play in the Europa League.

=== Heerenveen ===
On 31 August 2026, Hilgers signed a contract with another Eredivisie club, Heerenveen for two seasons with an option of one-year extension.

== International career ==
Hilgers is a former youth international for Netherlands at under-21 level.

In September 2024, Hilgers confirmed that he had decided to represent Indonesia at international level. On 1 October 2024, he was called up for 2026 FIFA World Cup qualifiers matches against Bahrain and China. On 10 October 2024, he made his debut against Bahrain in a 2–2 draw.

== Personal life ==
Born in the Netherlands, Hilgers is of Indonesian descent.

On 30 September 2024, Hilgers officially obtained Indonesian citizenship after being sworned as citizens of Indonesia during a ceremony at the Indonesian Embassy alongside Eliano Reijnders.

== Career statistics ==
=== Club ===
As of match played 21 November 2026

Appearances and goals by club, season and competition
| Club | Season | League | | | KNVB Cup | | Europe | | Other | | Total | |
| Club | Season | Division | Apps | Goals | Apps | Goals | Apps | Goals | Apps | Goals | Apps | Goals |
|---|---|---|---|---|---|---|---|---|---|---|---|---|
| Twente | 2020–21 | Eredivisie | 3 | 0 | 0 | 0 | 0 | 0 | — | | 3 | 0 |
| Twente | 2021–22 | Eredivisie | 24 | 1 | 2 | 0 | 0 | 0 | — | | 26 | 1 |
| Twente | 2022–23 | Eredivisie | 30 | 1 | 1 | 0 | 4 (Note: Appearances in UEFA Conference League) | 0 | — | | 35 | 1 |
| Twente | 2023–24 | Eredivisie | 28 | 0 | 0 | 0 | 5 | 0 | — | | 33 | 0 |
| Twente | 2024–25 | Eredivisie | 26 | 1 | 0 | 0 | 9 (Note: Two appearances in UEFA Champions League qualifying rounds, seven appearances in UEFA Europa League) | 1 | — | | 35 | 2 |
| Twente | Total | | 111 | 3 | 3 | 0 | 18 | 1 | 0 | 0 | 132 | 4 |
| Heerenveen | 2026–27 | Eredivisie | 2 | 0 | 1 | 0 | — | | — | | 3 | 0 |
| Career total | | | 113 | 3 | 4 | 0 | 18 | 1 | 0 | 0 | 135 | 4 |

=== International ===
As of match played 10 June 2025

Appearances and goals by national team and year
| National team | Year | Apps | Goals |
|---|---|---|---|
| Indonesia | 2024 | 2 | 0 |
| Indonesia | 2025 | 2 | 0 |
| Total | | 4 | 0 |

== See also ==
- List of Indonesia international footballers born outside Indonesia
