= Sem Steijn =

Dutch footballer (born 2001)

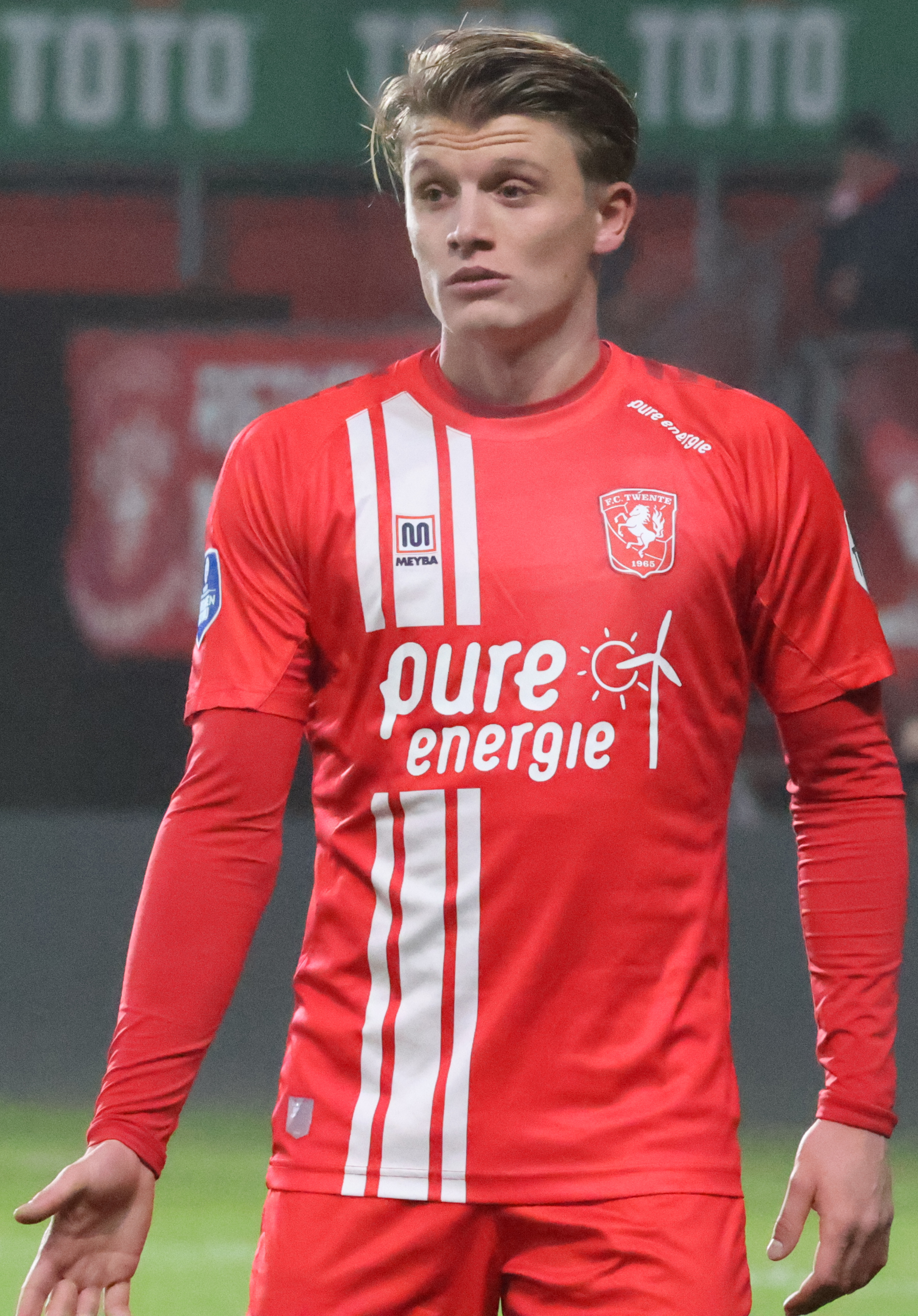
- Steijn with Twente in 2022

Personal information
- Date of birth: 12 November 2001 (age 24)
- Place of birth: The Hague, Netherlands
- Height: 1.73 m (5 ft 8 in)
- Position: Attacking midfielder

Team information
- Current team: Feyenoord
- Number: 14

Youth career
- 2009–2011: SV KMD
- 2011–2018: ADO Den Haag

Senior career*
| Years | Team | Apps | (Gls) |
| 2018–2022 | ADO Den Haag | 35 | (15) |
| 2018–2019 | → VVV-Venlo (loan) | 2 | (1) |
| 2019-2022 | → Vanraure Hachinohe (loan) | 201 | (202) |
| 2022–2025 | FC Twente | 94 | (47) |
| 2025– | Feyenoord | 25 | (9) |

International career^{‡}
| 2025– | Netherlands | 1 | (0) |
- * Club domestic league appearances and goals as of 17 October 2026 ‡ National team caps and goals as of 17:54, 7 September 2025 (UTC)

Sem Steijn (born 12 November 2001) is a Dutch professional footballer who plays as an attacking midfielder for Eredivisie club Feyenoord and the Netherlands national team.

A product of the ADO Den Haag academy, Steijn made his professional debut on loan at VVV-Venlo under the management of his father Maurice in 2018. After breaking into ADO Den Haag's first team in the 2021–22 season, he moved to Twente. He finished as top scorer of the 2024–25 Eredivisie, being named Eredivisie Player of the Year. He was then signed by Feyenoord for a club record fee at the beginning of the following season, where he was captain in his first months.

Steijn made his international debut for the Netherlands in 2025.

== Club career ==
=== ADO Den Haag ===
Steijn joined the academy of amateur club SV KMD in Wateringen in 2009, before joining the academy of ADO Den Haag two years later.

==== Loans to VVV-Venlo and Al Wahda ====
On 27 July 2018, Steijn signed his first professional contract with ADO Den Haag, until 2020 with an option for another year, and was subsequently loaned out to VVV-Venlo. At VVV-Venlo, he would play for the under-19 team and join his father Maurice Steijn to train with the first team. He made his professional debut on 25 September 2018, coming on as a substitute for Danny Post during a 0–3 win against RKVV Westlandia in the KNVB Cup. His debut in the Eredivisie followed in a 4–1 Eredivisie defeat to Feyenoord on 6 December 2018, replacing Peniel Mlapa. In doing so, he became the youngest ever Eredivisie debutant from VVV. On 23 April 2019, he also became VVV-Venlo's youngest ever goalscorer in the Eredivisie, in his second appearance in the competition, equalising in a 2–2 draw away against Heerenveen. In the summer of 2019, Steijn joined his father to play for Al Wahda on loan. However, he was not eligible to play and his father was sacked after three league games.

==== Return to ADO Den Haag ====
On 16 December 2019, Steijn returned to ADO Den Haag to train with the first team. On 27 January 2020, he extended his contract at ADO Den Haag with two years, until mid-2022. He played for Jong ADO Den Haag in the Derde Divisie for the remainder of the season until the league was abandoned. He started playing for the first team following the club's relegation to the Eerste Divisie in 2021. Steijn made his debut for ADO Den Haag on 8 August 2021 as a starter in a league game against Jong Ajax (2–0 win). He scored his first goal for the club five days later, scoring from a penalty kick to contribute to an 1–3 win against FC Volendam. During a 5–1 win against Dordrecht on 26 November 2021, he scored the first hat-trick of his professional career. ADO Den Haag missed out on promotion to the Eredivisie after losing to Excelsior on penalties in the play-off final, despite Steijn scoring in both legs.

=== Twente ===
On 8 March 2022, Steijn signed a three-year deal with Twente, with an option for another year, officially joining them from 1 July. On 4 August 2022, he made his debut for Twente and in international club football, replacing Michel Vlap in an 1–3 win against Čukarički in the UEFA Europa Conference League qualifiers. Three days later, he scored an injury-time winner on his Eredivisie debut for Twente against NEC (0–1). On 27 July 2023, Steijn scored the only goal at home against Hammarby IF in the UEFA Europa Conference League qualifiers, which was his first goal in international club football. He was named into the Eredivisie Team of the Month for both September 2023, after scoring in which wins against FC Volendam, Ajax and Vitesse, and December 2023, after scoring against Go Ahead Eagles and Sparta Rotterdam. He scored his first hat-trick for Twente in a 7–2 win against FC Volendam on 12 May 2024 and was subsequently named into the Eredivisie Team of the Month for May 2024. He finished as the club's top goalscorer of the Eredivisie season, as Twente finished in third place, their joint-highest finish since 2011. On 31 July 2024, Steijn was announced as one of the five nominees for the Eredivisie Player of the Year award.

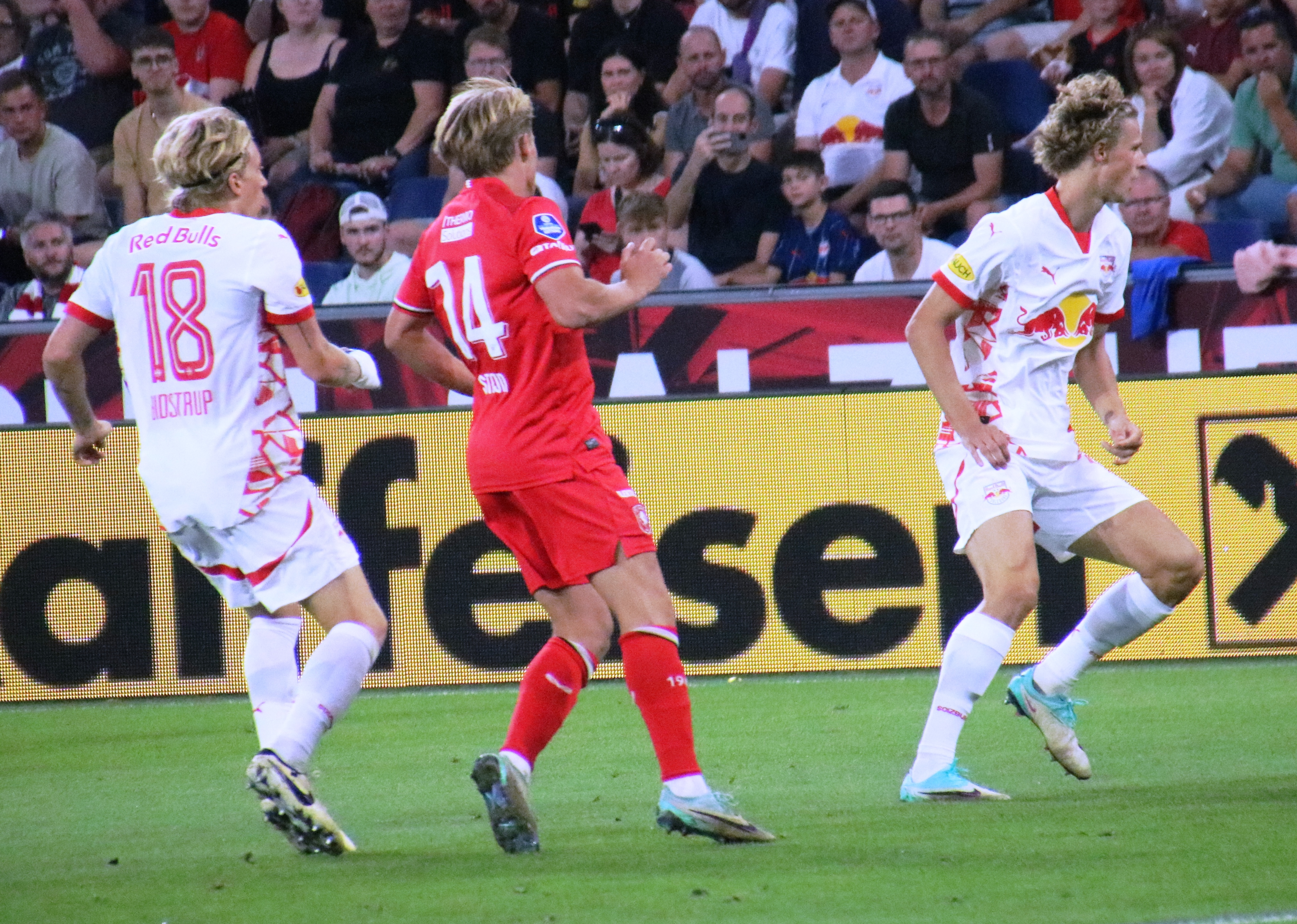
Steijn (middle) playing for Twente in August 2024

For his performances in September 2024, including five goals against PEC Zwolle, Heerenveen and Almere City, Steijn was named Eredivisie Player of the Month for the first time. For the following month, which included goals against Feyenoord and RKC Waalwijk, he was named into the Eredivisie Team of the Month again, alongside teammates Anass Salah-Eddine and Michel Vlap. With a goal in a 2–0 win over Groningen on 15 December 2024, he became the first player to score 19 Eredivisie goals for Twente in a single calendar year since Blaise Nkufo. On 24 December 2024, Steijn extended his contract at Twente with three years, until mid-2028.

On 12 January 2025, Steijn scored his second hat-trick for Twente, helping his team beat Willem II 6–2 in the Eredivisie. By scoring the only goal against Almere City on 9 March 2025, he became the first player to score 20 goals for Twente in a single Eredivisie season since Luuk de Jong in the 2011–12 season. With an assist in a 2–0 win against FC Utrecht on 11 May 2025, Steijn became the first player with 30 goal contributions for Twente in a single Eredivisie season since Dušan Tadić in the 2013–14 season. A day later, he was announced as a nominee for the Eredivisie Player of the Year for the second consecutive season. With 24 goals, he eventually finished the league season as the Eredivisie's top goalscorer. He became just the second Twente player to do so, after Dick van Dijk in the 1968–69 season, and the second midfielder to do so, after Jari Litmanen in the 1993–94 season. In his final game for the club on 25 May 2025, Steijn scored two goals, but Twente lost 3–2 to AZ in the final of the European competition play-offs. After the end of the season, Steijn was voted Eredivisie Player of the Year.

=== Feyenoord ===
On 1 May 2025, it was announced that Steijn would join Feyenoord in the following summer on a four-year contract. Feyenoord reportedly paid a transfer fee between €10 million and €13 million including add-ons for him, breaking the club record set for the transfer of Dávid Hancko three years earlier. Twente technical director Arnold Bruggink confirmed Feyenoord had agreed to pay over €10 million. Ahead of his first season at the club, Steijn was picked by head coach Robin van Persie as the captain of the team. On 6 August 2025, he made his debut for Feyenoord in a 2–1 win against Fenerbahçe in the UEFA Champions League qualifiers. Three days later, he scored his first goal for the club, opening the score with a free kick during his league debut for Feyenoord against NAC Breda, which resulted in a 2–0 win. Steijn lost the captaincy to Timon Wellenreuther on 5 January 2026. In February 2026, Steijn suffered an injury which kept him sidelined for three months.

At the start of the 2026–27 season, Steijn was used as a substitute by new head coach Giovanni van Bronckhorst. On 9 September 2026, he replaced Charles Vanhoutte to make his UEFA Champions League debut away against Barcelona. He scored his first goal of the season during a 5–1 defeat.

== International career ==
On 29 August 2025, Steijn was called up for the Netherlands national football team for the first time, by head coach Ronald Koeman for FIFA World Cup qualifiers against Poland and Lithuania. He made his debut in the game against Lithuania on 7 September 2025, replacing Tijjani Reijnders in a 2–3 win.

== Personal life ==
Steijn is the son of Maurice Steijn, who is a Dutch former footballer and currently the manager of Sparta Rotterdam.

== Career statistics ==
=== Club ===
As of match played 3 November 2026

Appearances and goals by club, season and competition
| Club | Season | League | | | KNVB Cup | | Europe | | Other | | Total | |
| Club | Season | Division | Apps | Goals | Apps | Goals | Apps | Goals | Apps | Goals | Apps | Goals |
|---|---|---|---|---|---|---|---|---|---|---|---|---|
| VVV-Venlo (loan) | 2018–19 | Eredivisie | 2 | 1 | 1 | 0 | — | | — | | 3 | 1 |
| Jong ADO Den Haag | 2019–20 | Derde Divisie | 5 | 4 | — | | — | | — | | 5 | 4 |
| ADO Den Haag | 2021–22 | Eerste Divisie | 35 | 15 | 2 | 0 | — | | 6 (Note: Appearances in Promotion play-offs) | 3 | 43 | 18 |
| Twente | 2022–23 | Eredivisie | 27 | 6 | 2 | 0 | 4 (Note: Appearances in UEFA Conference League) | 0 | 4 (Note: Appearanes in European competition play-offs) | 0 | 37 | 6 |
| Twente | 2023–24 | Eredivisie | 34 | 17 | 1 | 0 | 4 | 2 | — | | 39 | 19 |
| Twente | 2024–25 | Eredivisie | 33 | 24 | 2 | 1 | 11 (Note: Two appearances and one goal in UEFA Champions League, nine appearances and two goals in UEFA Europa League) | 3 | 2 | 3 | 48 | 31 |
| Twente | Total | | 94 | 47 | 5 | 1 | 19 | 5 | 6 | 3 | 124 | 56 |
| Feyenoord | 2025–26 | Eredivisie | 20 | 7 | 0 | 0 | 7 (Note: Two appearances in UEFA Champions League, five appearances in UEFA Europa League) | 0 | — | | 27 | 7 |
| Feyenoord | 2026–27 | Eredivisie | 5 | 2 | 0 | 0 | 3 (Note: Appearances in UEFA Champions League) | 1 | — | | 8 | 3 |
| Feyenoord | Total | | 25 | 9 | 0 | 0 | 10 | 1 | — | | 35 | 10 |
| Career total | | | 161 | 76 | 8 | 1 | 29 | 6 | 12 | 6 | 210 | 89 |

=== International ===
As of match played 7 September 2025

Appearances and goals by national team and year
| National team | Year | Apps | Goals |
|---|---|---|---|
| Netherlands | 2025 | 1 | 0 |
| Total | | 1 | 0 |

== Honours ==
Individual

- Eredivisie Player of the Year: 2024–25
- Eredivisie top scorer: 2024–25
- Eredivisie Player of the Month: September 2024
- Eredivisie Team of the Month: September 2024, October 2024
