= Alec Van Hoorenbeeck =

Belgian footballer

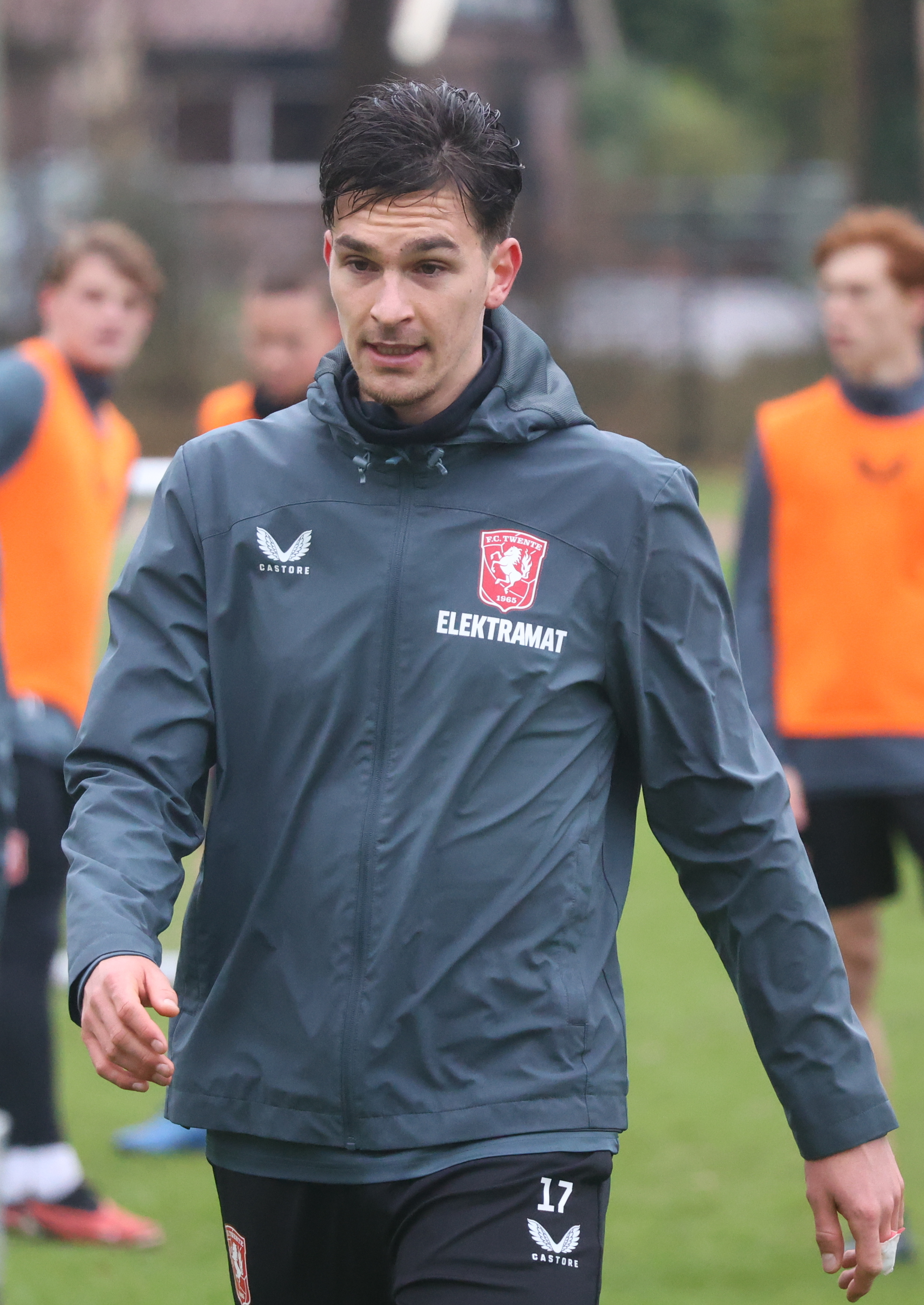
- Van Hoorenbeeck with Twente in 2023

Personal information
- Date of birth: 30 December 1998 (age 27)
- Place of birth: Mortsel, Belgium
- Height: 1.87 m (6 ft 2 in)
- Position: Left-back

Team information
- Current team: Hajduk Split
- Number: 5

Youth career
- Kontich FC
- –2014: Beerschot AC
- 2014–2019: Mechelen

Senior career*
Years	Team	Apps	(Gls)
2019–2024	Mechelen	43	(0)
2020	→ Heist (loan)	7	(0)
2020–2021	→ Helmond Sport (loan)	38	(3)
2023–2024	→ Twente (loan)	16	(0)
2024–2026	Twente	21	(2)
2025–2026	→ Heracles Almelo (loan)	24	(2)
2026–	Hajduk Split	4	(0)
- * Club domestic league appearances and goals as of 15 July 2026

Alec Van Hoorenbeeck (born 30 December 1998) is a Belgian footballer who plays as a left-back for Croatian Football League club Hajduk Split.

== Career ==
He was sent on a season-long loan to Helmond Sport on 15 August 2020 as part of a new cooperation agreement between Mechelen and Helmond Sport.

On 15 August 2023, Van Hoorenbeeck moved on loan to Twente, with an option to buy. On 29 March 2024, Twente made the transfer permanent and signed a two-year contract with Van Hoorenbeeck.

== Career statistics ==
As of match played 24 July 2026

Appearances and goals by club, season and competition
Club	Season	League			National cup (Note: Includes Belgian Cup, KNVB Cup)		Continental		Other		Total	
Club	Season	Division	Apps	Goals	Apps	Goals	Apps	Goals	Apps	Goals	Apps	Goals
Mechelen	2019–20	Belgian Pro League	1	0	0	0	—		—		1	0
Mechelen	2021–22	Belgian Pro League	13	0	2	0	—		4 (Note: Appearances in Belgian Pro League Playoff)	0	19	0
Mechelen	2022–23	Belgian Pro League	26	0	5	0	—		—		31	0
Mechelen	2023–24	Belgian Pro League	3	0	—		—		1 (Note: Appearance in Belgian Super Cup)	0	4	0
Mechelen	Total		43	0	7	0	—		5	0	55	0
Heist (loan)	2019–20	Belgian Division 3	7	0	—		—		—		7	0
Helmond Sport (loan)	2020–21	Eerste Divisie	38	3	1	0	—		—		39	3
Twente (loan)	2023–24	Eredivisie	16	0	0	0	1 (Note: Appearance in UEFA Conference League)	0	—		17	0
Twente	2024–25	Eredivisie	21	2	2	1	7 (Note: Two appearances and one goal in UEFA Champions League, five appearances in UEFA Europa League)	1	—		30	4
Heracles Almelo (loan)	2025–26	Eredivisie	24	2	3	0	—		—		27	2
Hajduk Split	2026–27	Prva HNL	0	0	0	0	3 (Note: Appearances in UEFA Europa League)	1	—		3	1
Career total			149	7	12	1	11	1	5	0	177	10

== Honours ==
Mechelen

- Belgian Cup: 2018–19
