= Maurice Steijn =

Dutch football manager (born 1973)

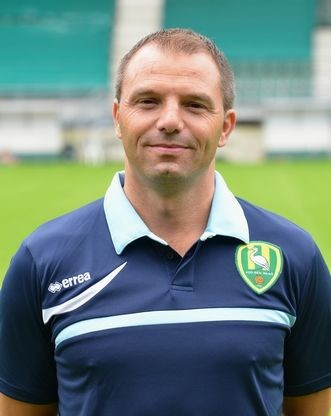
- Steijn as coach of ADO Den Haag in 2012

Personal information
- Date of birth: 20 November 1973 (age 52)
- Place of birth: The Hague, Netherlands
- Position: Midfielder

Team information
- Current team: ADO Den Haag (manager)

Youth career
- 1980–1981: VIOS
- 1981–1993: ADO Den Haag

Senior career*
Years	Team	Apps	(Gls)
1993–1999	ADO Den Haag	98	(6)
1999–2001	NAC Breda	36	(1)
Total		134	(7)

Managerial career
- 2010: ADO Den Haag (caretaker)
- 2011–2014: ADO Den Haag
- 2014–2019: VVV-Venlo
- 2019: Al Wahda
- 2020–2021: NAC Breda
- 2022–2023: Sparta Rotterdam
- 2023: Ajax
- 2024–2026: Sparta Rotterdam
- 2026–: ADO Den Haag
- * Club domestic league appearances and goals

Maurice Steijn (born 20 November 1973) is a Dutch professional football manager and former player. He currently serves as the head coach of Eredivisie club ADO Den Haag.

== Managerial career ==
=== ADO Den Haag ===
Steijn has a Bachelor of Education and has taught in primary education. As a coach, he started as an assistant to Bob Kootwijk at the ADO Den Haag amateur branch and also coached youth teams. After this, he became assistant for the first team and until 30 March 2010 also coached the ADO reserves, before being appointed caretaker manager of the ADO first team after the dismissal of Raymond Atteveld.

After the departure of John van den Brom to Vitesse on 30 June 2011, Steijn was appointed head coach of ADO. On 5 February 2014, after three years as head coach, Steijn was dismissed after a loss against Heracles, and was succeeded by his assistant, former defender Henk Fräser.

=== VVV-Venlo ===
Maurice Steijn was appointed head coach of VVV-Venlo in July 2014 and held the position until June 2019. In his first two seasons, the team finished seventh and second in the Eerste Divisie, but failed to secure promotion through the play-offs. In the 2016–2017 season, VVV-Venlo won the Eerste Divisie title under his leadership, earning promotion to the Eredivisie. The club maintained its top-flight status in the following two seasons, finishing fifteenth and twelfth respectively.

In June 2019, Steijn left VVV-Venlo to become the head coach of Al-Wahda in the United Arab Emirates.

=== Al-Wahda ===
Maurice Steijn was appointed head coach of Al-Wahda in June 2019 but was dismissed in October 2019 after just three games in charge.

=== NAC Breda ===
Maurice Steijn was appointed head coach of NAC Breda in July 2020, signing a three-year contract. During the 2020–2021 season, the team finished fifth in the Eerste Divisie and failed to secure promotion after losing to NEC in the play-off final.

His tenure was marked by internal conflicts, including disagreements with technical director Ton Lokhoff and criticism from supporters over the team's defensive playing style. In June 2021, Steijn resigned from his position due to threats directed at him and his family.

=== Sparta Rotterdam ===
Maurice Steijn was appointed head coach of Sparta Rotterdam in April 2022, taking over from Henk Fraser with four matches remaining in the season and the club at the bottom of the Eredivisie table. Under his leadership, Sparta secured 10 points from those four games, finishing 14th and avoiding relegation. In the 2022–23 season, Steijn guided Sparta to a sixth-place finish and reached the final of the European play-offs.

In June 2023, he departed to become head coach of Ajax after the Amsterdam club activated a clause in his contract.

=== Ajax ===
On 14 June 2023, Steijn was hired by Ajax on a three-year contract. On 23 October 2023, a day after a 4–3 loss to Utrecht placed it second-from-last on the Eredivisie table, Ajax announced that it was parting ways with Steijn after just two wins through eleven matches in charge. The club under Steijn experienced their worst ever start of a season, with only five points in seven matches, taking into consideration that the 1964–65 season was during a standard of two points for a win.

=== Return to Sparta ===
On 2 November 2024, Sparta Rotterdam announced that Steijn would return to the club on a contract until the end of the season. He departed the club by the end of the 2025–26 season.

=== Return to Den Haag ===
Steijn was named successor to Robin Peter as manager of ADO Den Haag in November 2026.

== Personal life ==
Steijn is the father of the Dutch footballer Sem Steijn, and managed his son's debut at VVV-Venlo on 6 December 2018.

== Managerial statistics ==
As of 17 May 2026

Managerial record by team and tenure
Team	From	To	Record					Ref
Team	From	To	P	W	D	L	Win %	Ref
ADO Den Haag (caretaker)	30 March 2010	30 June 2010	5	2	0	3	40.00	
ADO Den Haag	30 June 2011	5 February 2014	100	29	23	48	29.00	
VVV-Venlo	1 July 2014	8 June 2019	197	88	47	62	44.67	
Al Wahda	9 June 2019	10 October 2019	8	3	2	3	37.50	
NAC Breda	10 July 2020	19 June 2021	42	23	8	11	54.76	
Sparta Rotterdam	25 April 2022	12 June 2023	43	21	11	11	48.84	
Ajax	14 June 2023	23 October 2023	11	2	4	5	18.18	
Sparta Rotterdam	2 November 2024	30 June 2026	61	21	15	25	34.43	
Total			467	189	110	168	40.47	—

== Honours ==
VVV-Venlo: 2016-17 Eerste Divisie

- Eredivisie Manager of the Month: January 2026
