= 2024–25 FC Twente season =

FC Twente
2024–25 season
- Chairman: Paul van der Kraan
- Head coach: Joseph Oosting
- Stadium: De Grolsch Veste
- Eredivisie: 5th
- KNVB Cup: Second round
- UEFA Champions League: Third qualifying round
- UEFA Europa League: League phase
- Average home league attendance: 29,662
Home colours	Away colours	Third colours
- All statistics correct as of 4 May 2025.

The 2024–25 season is the 60th season in the history of FC Twente, and the club's sixth consecutive season in the Eredivisie. In addition to the domestic league, the club is participating in the KNVB Cup, the UEFA Champions League and the UEFA Europa League.

== Transfers ==
=== In ===
Pos.	Player	Transferred from	Fee	Date	Source
DF	(Belgium) Alec Van Hoorenbeeck	(Belgium) KV Mechelen	€600,000	1 July 2024	
DF	(Netherlands) Bas Kuipers	(Netherlands) Go Ahead Eagles	Undisclosed	1 July 2024	
FW	(Netherlands) Sam Lammers	(Scotland) Rangers	£2.7m	26 July 2024	

=== Out ===
Pos.	Player	Transferred to	Fee	Date	Source
DF	(Netherlands) Gijs Smal	(Netherlands) Feyenoord	End of contract	1 July 2024	

== Pre-season and friendlies ==
Win Draw Loss Cancelled

22 June 2024 Friendly	Stevo (Netherlands)	v	(Netherlands) Twente	Geesteren
18:00				Stadium: Sportpark De Peuverweide
Note: The match was canceled due to an accident that occurred before its start, as a scaffold carrying a banner fell on spectators, causing injuries.

28 June 2024 Friendly	Twente (Netherlands)	2–2	(Scotland) Motherwell	Deurningen
19:00	Rots 47', 78'		Miller 25'; Ebiye 77'	Stadium: Sportpark Het Hoge Vonder

6 July 2024 Friendly	Twente (Netherlands)	2–2	(Belgium) Sint-Truiden	Goor
14:00				Stadium: Sportpark Heeckeren

12 July 2024 Friendly	Twente (Netherlands)	2–1	(Denmark) FC Nordsjælland
12:00

6 July 2024 Friendly	Twente (Netherlands)	0–0	(Denmark) FC Nordsjælland
14:30
Note: Abandoned after 20 minutes due to weather.

20 July 2024 Friendly	Hannover 96 (Germany)	3–3	(Netherlands) Twente
14:00

24 July 2024 Friendly	Schalke 04 (Germany)	0–0	(Netherlands) Twente	Marl, Germany
18:30				Stadium: EVONIK Sportpark I

== Competitions ==
=== Overall record ===
Competition	First match	Last match	Starting round	Final position	Record							
Competition	First match	Last match	Starting round	Final position	Pld	W	D	L	GF	GA	GD	Win %
Eredivisie	10 August 2024	May 2025	Matchday 1		31	14	9	8	52	37	+15	45.16
KNVB Cup	18 December 2024	15 January 2025	Second round	Round of 16	2	1	0	1	4	5	−1	50.00
UEFA Champions League	6 August 2024	13 August 2024	Third qualifying round	Third qualifying round	2	0	1	1	4	5	−1	0.00
UEFA Europa League	25 September 2024	20 February 2025	League stage	Knockout phase play-offs	10	3	4	3	12	15	−3	30.00
Total					45	18	14	13	72	62	+10	40.00

Source: Soccerway

=== Eredivisie ===
==== League table ====
Pos	Team	Pld	W	D	L	GF	GA	GD	Pts	Qualification or relegation
4	Utrecht	34	18	10	6	62	45	+17	64	Qualification for the Europa League second qualifying round
5	AZ (O)	34	16	9	9	58	37	+21	57	Qualification for the European competition play-offs
6	Twente	34	15	9	10	62	49	+13	54	Qualification for the European competition play-offs
7	Go Ahead Eagles	34	14	9	11	57	55	+2	51	Qualification for the Europa League league phase (Note: Qualified for the Europa League league phase as the 2024–25 KNVB Cup winners.)
8	NEC	34	12	7	15	51	46	+5	43	Qualification for the European competition play-offs

Source: Eredivisie
Rules for classification: 1) Points; 2) Goal difference; 3) Goals scored; 4) Head-to-head points; 5) Head-to-head goal difference; 6) Head-to-head away goals scored; 7) Play-off if relevant for deciding champion, relegation or participating in a European league, otherwise by draw. 8) Penalty shoot-out (only after a play-off)
(O) Play-off winners

==== Results summary ====
Overall								Home						Away					
Pld	W	D	L	GF	GA	GD	Pts	W	D	L	GF	GA	GD	W	D	L	GF	GA	GD
26	13	7	6	52	27	+25	46	9	3	1	30	4	+26	4	4	5	22	23	−1

Last updated: 17 March 2025.
Source: https://www.worldfootball.net/teams/te1965/fc-twente/all-matches/

==== Matches ====
The match schedule was released on 24 June 2024.

10 August 2024 1	NEC	1–2	Twente	Nijmegen
18:30	K.Sano 28'	Report	Lammers 8'; Van Hoorenbeeck 54'	Stadium: Goffertstadion; Attendance: 12.540; Referee: Allard Lindhout

17 August 2024 2	Twente	1–1	Sparta Rotterdam	Enschede
18:45	Hilgers (yellow card) 45+4'; Steijn 75' (pen.)	Report	Lauritsen 90+1'	Stadium: De Grolsch Veste; Attendance: 29.200; Referee: Jeroen Manschot

1 September 2024 4	Utrecht	2–1	Twente	Utrecht
12:15	Toornstra 14'; Bozdoğan 52'	Report	Lammers 11'; Bruns (yellow card) 19'; Taha (yellow card) 64'	Stadium: Stadion Galgenwaard; Attendance: 19,463; Referee: Dennis Higler

14 September 2024 5	Twente	1–1	PEC Zwolle	Enschede
16:30	Steijn 63'	Report	Vente 8'	Stadium: De Grolsch Veste; Attendance: 29.500; Referee: Jochem Kamphuis

18 September 2024 3	Twente	2–0	Heerenveen	Enschede
20:00	Salah-Eddine (yellow card) 16'; Steijn 22' (pen.), 39'; Regeer (yellow card) 61'	Report	V.der Hart (yellow card) 21'; Köhlert (yellow card) 90'	Stadium: De Grolsch Veste; Attendance: 29.500; Referee: Serdar Gözübüyük

22 September 2024 6	Almere	0–5	Twente	Almere
14:30	Haye (yellow card) 44'	Report	Steijn 9', 45+1'; Eiting (yellow card) 39'; Lammers 55'; Wolfswinkel 75'; Salah-Eddine 75'	Stadium: Yanmar Stadion; Attendance: 4.222; Referee: Richard Martens

29 September 2024 7	Twente	1–0	NAC Breda	Enschede
14:30	Eiting (yellow card) 69'; Wolfswinkel 76'; Besselink (yellow card) 85'	Report	Valerius (yellow card) 43'; Lucassen (yellow card) 49'	Stadium: De Grolsch Veste; Attendance: 29.750; Referee: Martin van den Kerkhof

6 October 2024 8	Feyenoord	2–1	Twente	Feyenoord
14:30	Ueda 28'; In-beom 43', (yellow card) 66'; Q.Timber (yellow card) 90+2'	Report	Hilgers (yellow card) 71'; Steijn 79', (yellow card) 90+4'	Stadium: De Kuip; Attendance: 47.500; Referee: Serdar Gözübüyük

19 October 2024 9	RKC Waalwijk	2–2	Twente	Waalwijk
20:00	Margaret 23'; van der Water 47'; Lelieveld (yellow card) 67'	Report	Steijn 11'; Vlap (yellow card) 27'; Regeer (yellow card) 76'; Eiting 90+1'	Stadium: Mandemakers Stadion; Attendance: 6,674; Referee: Danny Desmond Makkelie

27 October 2024 10	Twente	5–0	Heracles Almelo	Enschede
14:30	Benita 38' (o.g.); Salah-Eddine 42'; Hilgers 59'; Lammers 77'; Vlap 90+3'	Report		Stadium: De Grolsch Veste; Attendance: 30.000; Referee: Dennis Higler

2 November 2024 11	Willem II	0–1	Twente	Tilburg
16:30	Amar Fatah (yellow card) 32'; Sigurgeirsson (yellow card) 48'; Lambert (yellow card) 83'; Bokila (yellow card) 90'	Report	Rots (yellow card) 51'; Lammers 58'	Stadium: Koning Willem II Stadion; Attendance: 12.775; Referee: Ingmar Oostrom

10 November 2024 12	Twente	2–2	Ajax	Enschede
14:30	Vlap 42', 65'; Besselink (yellow card) 55'	Report	Klaassen 59'; Traoré 67'; Hato (yellow card) 72'	Stadium: De Grolsch Veste; Attendance: 30.000; Referee: Allard Lindhout

23 November 2024 13	Fortuna Sittard	1–2	Twente	Sittard
21:00	Halilović (yellow card) 50'; Peterson 62' (pen.)	Report	Steijn 35'; Hilgers (yellow card) 38'; van Rooij (yellow card) 61'; Wolfswinkel 68'	Stadium: Fortuna Sittard Stadion; Attendance: 9.013; Referee: Serdar Gözübüyük

1 December 2024 14	Twente	3–2	Go Ahead Eagles	Enschede
14:30	Lammers 44'; Bruns (yellow card) 61'; Steijn 72'; Kuipers 81'	Report	Breum 24', 33', (yellow card) 45+1'; Edvardsen (yellow card) 45+1'	Stadium: De Grolsch Veste; Attendance: 29.800; Referee: Jeroen Manschot

6 December 2024 15	PSV	6–1	Twente	Eindhoven
20:00	Lang 20'; Tillman 34'; Saibari 45+2', 54'; Ledezma 63'; Pepi 85'	Report	Steijn 10'; Bruns (yellow card) 60'	Stadium: Philips Stadion; Attendance: 35,000; Referee: Sander van der Eijk

15 December 2024 16	Twente	2–0	FC Groningen	Enschede
14:30	van Rooij 24'; Steijn 57'; Sadílek (yellow card) 78'	Report	Resink (yellow card) 53'; Bacuna (yellow card) 75'	Stadium: De Grolsch Veste; Attendance: 29.000; Referee: Alex Bos

21 December 2024 17	AZ Alkmaar	1–0	Twente	Alkmaar
20:00	Penetra (yellow card) 45+1'; Parrott 48'; Goes (yellow card) 53'; Clasie (yellow card) 90+5'	Report	Lagerbielke (yellow card) 30'; Wolfswinkel (yellow card) 36'; Rots (yellow card) 65'; Kuipers (yellow card) 90+5'	Stadium: AFAS Stadion; Attendance: 18.503; Referee: Joey Kooij

12 January 2025 18	Twente	6–2	Willem II	Enschede
12:15	Steijn 12', 36', 50' (pen.); Wolfswinkel 68'; Sadílek 79'; Eiting 90+1'	Report	Behounek 31'; Joosten 40'; Bokila (yellow card) 71'	Stadium: De Grolsch Veste; Attendance: 29.500; Referee: Jeroen Manschot

19 January 2025 19	NAC Breda	2–1	Twente	Breda
12:15	Kaied 14'; Ómarsson 20'; Sauer (yellow card) 27'; Balard (yellow card) 72'	Report	Lagerbielke (yellow card) 45+2'; Rots 77'	Stadium: Rat Verlegh; Attendance: 18.957; Referee: Rob Dieperink

2 February 2025 21	Go Ahead Eagles	2–2	Twente	Deventer
14:30	Linthorst 11'; Breum (yellow card) 69'; Deijl 90+1' (pen.)	Report	Wolfswinkel (yellow card) 50'; Kuipers (yellow card) 53'; Steijn 66', 67'; Ünüvar (yellow card) 69'	Stadium: De Adelaarshorst; Attendance: 9.997; Referee: Dennis Higler

9 February 2025 22	Heerenveen	3–3	Twente	Heerenveen
16:45	Luković 33'; Espen van Ee 53'; Braude (yellow card) 56'; Gürbüz 90+3'	Report	Rots 3'; Lagerbielke 23'; Wolfswinkel (yellow card) 30', (goal) 62'; Kuipers (red card) 35'; Vlap (yellow card) 43'; Verschueren (yellow card) 90+4'	Stadium: Abe Lenstra Stadion; Attendance: 22.785; Referee: Jeroen Manschot

16 February 2025 23	Twente	2–0	RKC Waalwijk	Enschede
14:30	Lammers 28'; Steijn 83'	Report	van Gelderen (yellow card) 54'; Al Mazyani (yellow card) 77'	Stadium: De Grolsch Veste; Attendance: 29.500; Referee: Pol van Boekel

23 February 2025 20	Twente	2–0	NEC	Enschede
14:30	Kuipers 19', 80'; Sadílek (yellow card) 55'	Report	Verdonk (yellow card) 57'; Linssen (yellow card) 65'	Stadium: De Grolsch Veste; Attendance: 30.000; Referee: Danny Makkelie

1 March 2025 24	FC Groningen	1–1	Twente	Groningen
20:00	van Bergen 32'; Rente (yellow card) 84'; Vaessen (yellow card) 88'	Report	Steijn 45+4' (pen.)	Stadium: Euroborg; Referee: Dennis Higler

9 March 2025 25	Twente	1–0	Almere	Enschede
16:45	Steijn 19'	Report	Zagaritis (yellow card) 17'; Kadile (yellow card) 64'	Stadium: De Grolsch Veste; Attendance: 29,500; Referee: Marc Nagtegaal

16 March 2025 26	Twente	2–6	Feyenoord	Enschede
14:30	Steijn 41' (pen.), 71'; Rots (yellow card) 45+1'; Hilgers (yellow card) 67'	Report	Ueda 10', 23'; Paixão 14', 53', 62'; In-beom (yellow card) 27'; Moussa (yellow card) 43'; Trauner (yellow card) 45+3'; Sliti 90'	Stadium: De Grolsch Veste; Attendance: 30,000; Referee: Serdar Gözübüyük

30 March 2025 27	Heracles Almelo	2–1	Twente	Almelo
14:30	Hornkamp 9', 76'	Report	Ltaief 90'	Stadium: Asito stadion Attendance: 12,080; Referee: Jeroen Manschot

=== KNVB Cup ===
18 December 2024 Second round	VV Katwijk	2–3	Twente	Katwijk
18:45	Ravensbergen (yellow card) 7'; Schulte 17'; Tahiri 84'; Janmaat (yellow card) 84'	Report	Hoorenbeeck 3', (yellow card) 90+1'; Wolfswinkel 47'; Kuipers 50'	Stadium: Sportpark de Krom; Referee: Edwin van de Graaf

15 January 2025 Round of 16	Go Ahead Eagles	3–1	Twente	Deventer
18:45	Edvardsen 60'; Deijl 84'; Suray 90+4'	Report	Steijn 42'	Stadium: De Adelaarshorst; Attendance: 8.656; Referee: Danny Makkelie

=== UEFA Champions League ===
As the third-place team in Eredivisie, Twente entered the competition in the third qualifying round.

==== Third qualifying round ====
The third qualifying round draw was held on 22 July 2024, Twente were drawn against Austrian Football Bundesliga side Red Bull Salzburg.

6 August 2024 First leg	Red Bull Salzburg (Austria)	2–1	(Netherlands) Twente	Salzburg, Austria
20:45 CEST	Kjærgaard 41', 85'; Gourna-Douath (yellow card) 44'	Report	Vlap 90+1'	Stadium: Red Bull Arena; Attendance: 17,381; Referee: António Nobre (Portugal)

13 August 2024 Second leg	Twente (Netherlands)	3–3 (4–5 agg.)	(Austria) Red Bull Salzburg	Enschede
19:00 CEST	Rots (yellow card) 24'; Vlap (yellow card) 37'; Hilgers 43', (yellow card) 51'; Van Hoorenbeeck 64'; Steijn (yellow card) 82', (goal) 87'	Report	Gourna-Douath (yellow card) 9'; Kjærgaard 17', (penalty missed) 74'; Nene 25'; Yeo 46'; Blaswich (yellow card) 79'	Stadium: De Grolsch Veste; Attendance: 29,200; Referee: Irfan Peljto (Bosnia and Herzegovina)

=== UEFA Europa League ===
==== League phase ====
The league phase draw was held on 30 August 2024.

Pos	Team	Pld	W	D	L	GF	GA	GD	Pts	Qualification
21	(Royal Belgian Football Association) Union Saint-Gilloise	8	3	2	3	8	8	0	11	Advance to knockout phase play-offs (unseeded)
22	(Hellenic Football Federation) PAOK	8	3	1	4	12	10	+2	10	Advance to knockout phase play-offs (unseeded)
23	(Royal Dutch Football Association) Twente	8	2	4	2	8	9	−1	10	Advance to knockout phase play-offs (unseeded)
24	(Turkish Football Federation) Fenerbahçe	8	2	4	2	9	11	−2	10	Advance to knockout phase play-offs (unseeded)
25	(Portuguese Football Federation) Braga	8	3	1	4	9	12	−3	10	

Source: UEFA
Rules for classification: League phase tiebreakers

Round	1	2	3	4	5	6	7	8
Ground	A	H	H	A	H	A	A	H
Result	D	D	L	D	L	D	W	W
Position	16	23	28					23
Points	1	2	2	3	3	4	7	10

Source: UEFA
A = Away; H = Home; W = Win; D = Draw; L = Loss

Win Draw Loss Fixtures

25 September 2024 1	Manchester United (England)	1–1	(Netherlands) Twente	Manchester, England
20:00 BST	Eriksen 35'; Martínez (yellow card) 58'	Report	Bruns (yellow card) 14'; Lammers 68', (yellow card) 78'; Van Wolfswinkel (yellow card) 83'	Stadium: Old Trafford; Attendance: 73,069; Referee: Simone Sozza (Italy)

3 October 2024 2	Twente (Netherlands)	1–1	(Turkey) Fenerbahçe	Enschede
21:00 CEST	Vlap (yellow card) 14', (goal) 29'; Hilgers (yellow card) 59'; Tytoń (yellow card) 76'	Report	Oosterwolde (yellow card) 12'; Fred (yellow card) 41'; Kahveci (yellow card) 56'; Becão (yellow card) 68'; Tadić 71'; Amrabat (yellow card) 75'	Stadium: De Grolsch Veste; Attendance: 29,000; Referee: Chris Kavanagh (England)

24 October 2024 3	Twente (Netherlands)	0–2	(Italy) Lazio	Enschede
21:00 CEST	Unnerstall (red card) 11'; Van Wolfswinkel (yellow card) 63'; Van Rooij (yellow card) 68'; Bruns (yellow card) 69'; Vlap (yellow card) 72'	Report	Pedro 35'; Isaksen 87'	Stadium: De Grolsch Veste; Attendance: 29,500; Referee: Nikola Dabanović (Montenegro)

7 November 2024 4	Nice (France)	2-2	(Netherlands) Twente	Nice, France
18:45 CET	Camara (yellow card) 24'; Dante (yellow card) 49'; Boga 66'; Diop (red card) 70'; Bombito (yellow card) 84'; Cho 88'	Report	D. Rots 8'; Lammers 60'; Van Rooij (yellow card) 80' (yellow-red card) 90'	Stadium: Allianz Riviera; Attendance: 11,144; Referee: Balázs Berke (Hungary)

28 November 2024 5	Twente (Netherlands)	0-1	(Belgium) Union Saint-Gilloise	Enschede
21:00 CET	D. Rots (yellow card) 35'; Regeer (yellow card) 88'	Report	Fuseini 11'; Sykes (yellow card) 24'; Mac Allister (yellow card) 81'; Sadiki (yellow card) 90'; Khalaili (yellow card) 90+3'	Stadium: De Grolsch Veste; Attendance: 26,500; Referee: John Beaton (Scotland)
Note: Pocognoli (yellow card) 72'

12 December 2024 6	Olympiacos (Greece)	0-0	(Netherlands) Twente	Piraeus, Greece
19:45 EET	Martins (yellow card) 45+3'; Hezze (yellow card) 72'	Report	Regeer (yellow card) 14'; Van Hoorenbeeck (yellow card) 26'	Stadium: Karaiskakis Stadium; Attendance: 31.600; Referee: Jérôme Brisard (France)

23 January 2025 7	Malmö FF (Sweden)	2-3	(Netherlands) Twente	Malmö, Sweden
18:45 CET	Rösler (yellow card) 2'; Johnsen 32'; Berg (yellow card) 44'; Rosengren (yellow card) 60'; Busanello (yellow card) 64'; Rydström (yellow card) 77'; Christiansen 79', (yellow card) 89'; Botheim (yellow card) 80'	Report	Rots (yellow card) 9'; Ltaief (yellow card) 13'; Steijn 28' (pen.); Wolfswinkel 61' (pen.); Lagerbielke 64'; van Bergen (yellow card) 82'; Besselink (yellow card) 90+5'	Stadium: Stadion; Attendance: 16.432; Referee: Sascha Stegemann (German)

30 January 2025 8	Twente (Netherlands)	1-0	(Turkey) Beşiktaş	Enschede
21:00 CET	Salah-Eddine (yellow card) 6'; Rots 76'	Report	Svensson (yellow card) 18'; Immobile (yellow card) 37'; Rashica (yellow card) 54'; Topçu (yellow card) 66'	Stadium: De Grolsch Veste; Attendance: 28.500; Referee: Szymon Marciniak (Poland)

==== Knockout phase ====
13 February 2025 First leg	Twente (Netherlands)	2–1	(Norway) Bodø/Glimt	Enschede
21:00 CET (UTC+1)	Ltaief 5'; Lagerbielke (yellow card) 53'; Ünüvar (yellow card) 84'; Wolfswinkel 90+5' (pen.)		Bjørkan (yellow card) 38'; Hauge (yellow card) 41'; Gundersen (yellow card) 42'; Berg 85'	Stadium: De Grolsch Veste; Attendance: 29.500; Referee: Sebastian Gishamer (Austria)

20 February 2025 Second leg	Bodø/Glimt (Norway)	5–2 (a.e.t.) (6–4 agg.)	(Netherlands) Twente	Bodø
18:45 CET (UTC+1)	Høgh 56' (pen.); Saltnes (yellow card) 63'; Hilgers 90+2' (o.g.); Wembangomo 90+4'; Sondre Fet 111'; Verschueren 114' (o.g.)		Hilgers (yellow card) 7'; Sjøvold 26' (o.g.); Steijn (yellow card) 58', (goal) 90+6'; van Rooij (yellow card) 99'	Stadium: Aspmyra Stadion; Attendance: 6.417; Referee: Alejandro Hernández Hernández (Span)
