= 2026–27 SC Heerenveen season =

Season of a Dutch football club

SC Heerenveen
2026–27 season
- Manager: Robin Veldman
- Stadium: Abe Lenstra Stadion
- Eredivisie: Pre-season
- KNVB Cup: Pre-season

The 2026–27 season is the 107th season in the history of Sportclub Heerenveen and their 34th consecutive season in the Eredivisie. The club will also compete in the KNVB Cup.

== Transfers ==
=== In ===
Pos.	Player	Transferred from	Fee	Date	Source
DF	(France) Darling Bladi	(Spain) Betis Deportivo	Undisclosed	3 July 2026	

=== Out ===
Pos.	Player	Transferred to	Fee	Date	Source
FW	(Norway) Lasse Nordås	(England) Luton Town	Loan return	30 June 2026	
FW	(Netherlands) Amourricho van Axel Dongen	(Netherlands) Ajax	Loan return	30 June 2026	
GK	(Netherlands) Nordin Bakker	(Denmark) Midtjylland	Undisclosed	1 July 2026	
GK	(Netherlands) Jan Bekkema			1 July 2026	

== Pre-season ==
3 July 2026 Friendly	sc Heerenveen (Netherlands)	7–2	(Netherlands) De Graafschap
19:00		Report
Note: A match comprising two periods of one hour each.

17 July 2026 Friendly	Club Brugge (Belgium)	2–3	(Netherlands) sc Heerenveen
19:00

25 July 2026 Friendly	sc Heerenveen (Netherlands)	6–4	(Belgium) OH Leuven
13:00

1 August 2026 Friendly	sc Heerenveen (Netherlands)	v	(England) Wolverhampton Wanderers
15:00

== Competitions ==
=== Eredivisie ===
==== League table ====
Pos	Team	Pld	W	D	L	GF	GA	GD	Pts
8	Go Ahead Eagles	8	2	5	1	19	17	+2	11
9	Excelsior	8	3	2	3	16	14	+2	11
10	Heerenveen	8	2	3	3	11	11	0	9
11	NEC	8	2	3	3	13	14	−1	9
12	Cambuur	8	2	2	4	11	19	−8	8

Updated to match(es) played on 11 October 2026. Source: Eredivisie
Rules for classification: 1) Points; 2) Less loss points; 3) Goal difference; 4) Goals scored; 5) Head-to-head points; 6) Head-to-head goal difference; 7) Head-to-head away goals scored; 9) Play-off if relevant for deciding champion, relegation or participating in a European league, otherwise by draw. 9) Penalty shoot-out (only after a play-off)

==== Results summary ====
Overall								Home						Away					
Pld	W	D	L	GF	GA	GD	Pts	W	D	L	GF	GA	GD	W	D	L	GF	GA	GD
6	1	3	2	7	9	−2	6	1	1	2	3	5	−2	0	2	0	4	4	0

Last updated: 13 September 2026.
Source: Eredivisie

==== Results by round ====
Round	1	2	3	4	5
Ground	H	A	H	A	H
Result	W	D			
Position	7	8			

Updated to match(es) played on 16 August 2026. Source: Eredivisie
A = Away; H = Home; W = Win; D = Draw; L = Loss

==== Matches ====
The match schedule was released on 16 June 2026.

Win Draw Loss Fixtures

9 August 2026 1	Heerenveen	1–0	Twente	Heerenveen
16:45 CEST (UTC+2)	Oyen 52', (yellow card) 90+1'; Proper (yellow card) 75'	Report	Rots (yellow card) 90+5'	Stadium: Abe Lenstra Stadion; Referee: Marc Nagtegaal

16 August 2026 2	Ajax	2–2	Heerenveen	Amsterdam
16:45 CEST (UTC+2)	Klaverboer 7' (o.g.); Ouazane 33'; Regeer (yellow card) 57'; Bouwman (yellow card) 65'; Rosa (yellow card) 86'	Report	Trenskow 45', (yellow card) 51'; Rivera 82'	Stadium: Johan Cruyff Arena; Attendance: 54,239; Referee: Alex Bos

22 August 2026 3	Heerenveen	0–2	PEC Zwolle	Heerenveen
21:00 CEST (UTC+2)	Linday (yellow card) 79'	Report	Thomas (yellow card) 40'; Viergever 50'; Kostons (yellow card) 56', (goal) 61'	Stadium: Abe Lenstra Stadion; Referee: Richard Martens

30 August 2026 4	Willem II	2–2	Heerenveen	Tilburg
14:30 CEST (UTC+2)	Van Aalst 61'; Haen 82'	Report	Trenskow 84'; Braude 77'	Stadium: Koning Willem II Stadion; Referee: Jannick van der Laan

6 September 2026 5	Heerenveen	2–3	AZ	Heerenveen
14:30 CEST (UTC+2)	Courtens 21', (yellow card) 28'; Meerveld 30'	Report	Daal 7', (yellow card) 54'; Meerdink 69'; Oufkir 83', (yellow card) 90+1'	Stadium: Abe Lenstra Stadion; Referee: Jeroen Manschot

13 September 2026 6	Heerenveen	0–0	Telstar	Heerenveen
14:30 CEST (UTC+2)	Zagaritis (yellow card) 69'; Farji (yellow card) 83'	Report		Stadium: Abe Lenstra Stadion; Referee: Serdar Gözübüyük
