= Darling Bladi =

French footballer (born 2004)

Personal information
- Date of birth: 11 June 2004 (age 22)
- Place of birth: Créteil, France
- Height: 1.64 m (5 ft 5 in)
- Position: Left-back

Team information
- Current team: Heerenveen
- Number: 23

Youth career
- AS Orly
- CFF Paris
- 2019–2023: Saint-Étienne

Senior career*
Years	Team	Apps	(Gls)
2020–2025	Saint-Étienne B	35	(0)
2023–2025	Saint-Étienne	2	(0)
2024–2025	→ Bourg-Péronnas (loan)	26	(0)
2025–2026	Betis B	30	(1)
2025	Betis	0	(0)
2026–	Heerenveen	0	(0)
- * Club domestic league appearances and goals as of 10 June 2026

Darling Bladi (born 11 June 2004) is a French professional footballer who plays as a left-back for Eredivisie club Heerenveen.

== Career ==
In 2019, Bladi signed for Saint-Étienne's youth academy after leaving CFF Paris. He would make his Ligue 2 debut for the club in December 2023 in a match against Bordeaux.

On 14 May 2024, he signed his first professional contract with Saint-Étienne, a deal until 2027. On 7 July 2024, he was loaned out to Championnat National club Bourg-Péronnas for the rest of the season.

Quickly establishing himself as a key player in the team, he finished the season with twenty-six league appearances to his name.

On 19 July 2025, Bladi was transferred to Betis Deportivo, the reserve team of Real Betis. He made one late-substitute appearance for the main squad of Real Betis in Copa del Rey.

He joined Eredivisie club Heerenveen in July 2026, signing a three-year contract with a club option for a fourth year.

== Personal life ==
Born in France, Bladi is of Ivorian descent.

== Career statistics ==
As of match played 30 October 2025

Appearances and goals by club, season and competition
Club	Season	League			Cup		Europe		Other		Total	
Club	Season	Division	Apps	Goals	Apps	Goals	Apps	Goals	Apps	Goals	Apps	Goals
Saint-Étienne B	2020–21	National 3	1	0	—		—		—		1	0
Saint-Étienne B	2021–22	National 3	3	0	—		—		—		3	0
Saint-Étienne B	2022–23	National 3	9	0	—		—		—		9	0
Saint-Étienne B	2023–24	National 3	22	0	—		—		—		22	0
Saint-Étienne B	Total		35	0	—		—		—		35	0
Saint-Étienne	2023–24	Ligue 2	2	0	2	0	—		—		4	0
Bourg-Péronnas (loan)	2024–25	National	26	0	1	0	—		—		27	0
Betis B	2025–26	Primera Federación	9	0	—		—		—		9	0
Betis	2025–26	La Liga	0	0	1	0	0	0	—		1	0
Heerenveen	2026–27	Eredivisie	0	0	0	0	—		—		0	0
Career total			72	0	4	0	0	0	0	0	76	0
