= Younes Taha =

Footballer (born 2002)

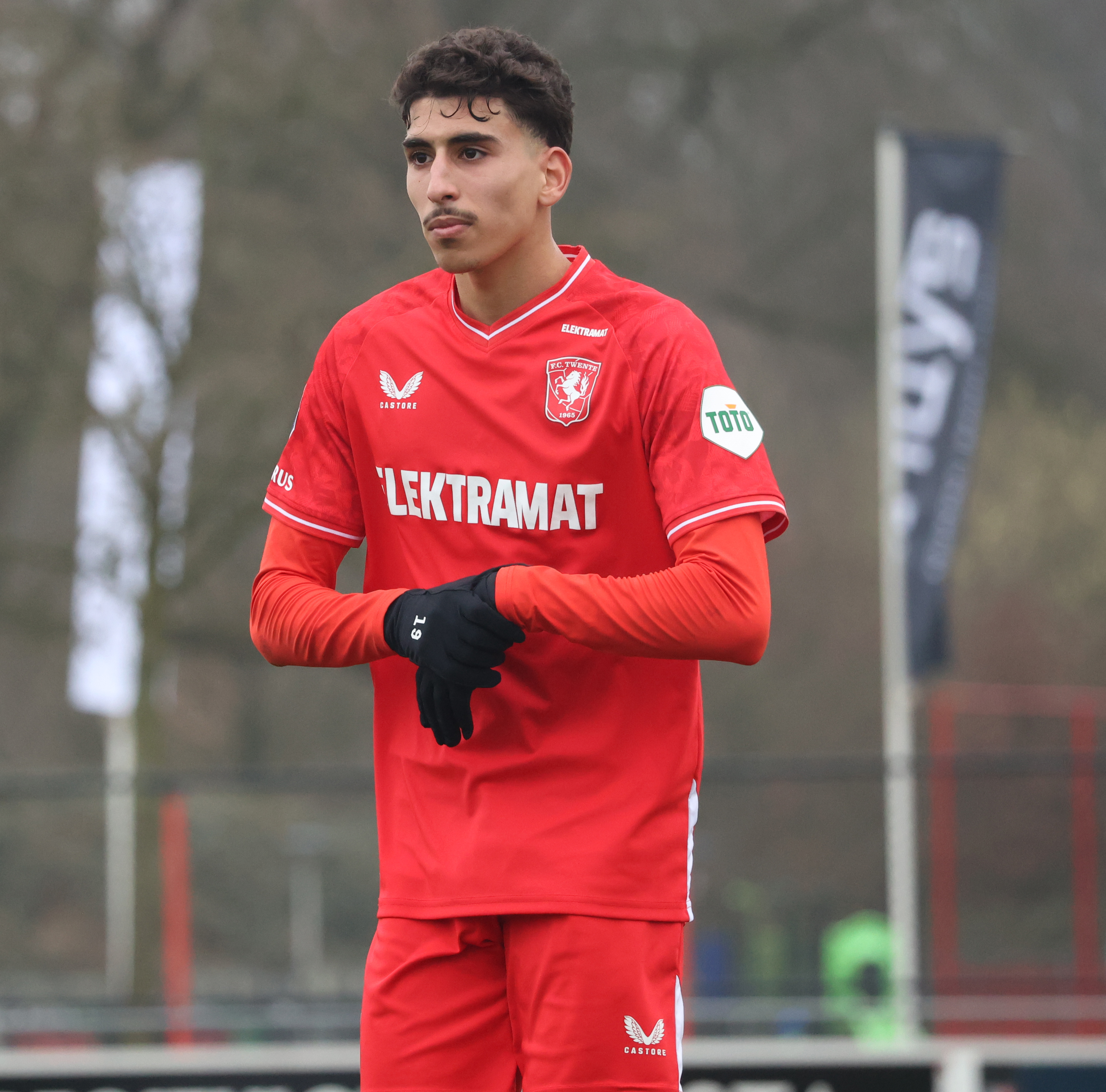
- Taha in 2024

Personal information
- Full name: Younes Taha El Idrissi
- Date of birth: 27 November 2002 (age 23)
- Place of birth: Amsterdam, Netherlands
- Height: 1.76 m (5 ft 9 in)
- Position: Midfielder

Team information
- Current team: Twente
- Number: 19

Youth career
- De Volewijckers
- DWS
- Purmersteijn
- 2018–2022: Volendam

Senior career*
Years	Team	Apps	(Gls)
2021–2022	Jong Volendam	30	(5)
2021–2022	Volendam	0	(0)
2022–2023	PEC Zwolle	33	(14)
2023–	Twente	38	(5)
2025–2026	→ Groningen (loan)	33	(5)

International career^{‡}
2023–2024	Morocco U23	11	(3)
Medal record
Representing Morocco
U-23 Africa Cup of Nations
Winner	2023 Morocco
- * Club domestic league appearances and goals as of 25 October 2026 ‡ National team caps and goals as of 23:30, 26 March 2024 (UTC)

Younes Taha El Idrissi (born 27 November 2002) is a professional footballer who plays as a midfielder for Eredivisie club Twente. Born in the Netherlands, he represents Morocco at youth level.

== Biography ==
Taha was born in the Netherlands and has Moroccan roots, originating from Imassine, a small village in the vicinity of Ouarzazate.

== Club career ==
=== PEC Zwolle ===
Taha joined PEC Zwolle in the summer of 2022 from FC Volendam, having never started a senior game for Volendam. He signed for PEC Zwolle on a two-year contract with an option for a third year.

Taha made his league debut in the Eerste Divisie starting on 7 August 2022 in a 2–1 win against De Graafschap at the MAC³PARK Stadion.

On 12 September 2022, Taha scored his first professional goal away against Jong AZ. In October 2022, Taha's contract with PEC Zwolle was improved and extended for an extra year. On 28 April 2023, Taha scored a league hat-trick against FC Dordrecht.

=== FC Twente ===
In June 2023, it was announced that Taha had signed a four-year contract with FC Twente.

On 7 July 2025, Taha moved on loan to Groningen.

== International career ==
Born in the Netherlands, Taha is of Moroccan descent. He was called up to the Morocco under-23s in March 2023.

In June 2023, Taha was included in the final squad of the Moroccan under-23 national team for the 2023 U-23 Africa Cup of Nations, hosted by Morocco itself. Having scored one goal in the group stage, he helped the Atlas Lions win their first title and qualify for the 2024 Summer Olympics.

== Career statistics ==
As of match played 25 October 2026

Appearances and goals by club, season and competition
Club	Season	League			KNVB Cup		Europe		Other		Total	
Club	Season	Division	Apps	Goals	Apps	Goals	Apps	Goals	Apps	Goals	Apps	Goals
Jong Volendam	2021–22	Tweede Divisie	30	5	—		—		2 (Note: Appearances in promotion play-offs)	1	32	6
PEC Zwolle	2022–23	Eerste Divisie	33	14	0	0	—		—		33	14
Twente	2023–24	Eredivisie	20	3	1	0	2 (Note: Appearances in UEFA Conference League)	0	—		23	3
Twente	2024–25	Eredivisie	9	1	0	0	2 (Note: Appearances in UEFA Champions League)	0	2 (Note: Appearances in European play-offs)	0	13	1
Twente	2026–27	Eredivisie	9	2	0	0	6 (Note: Two appearances in UEFA Europa League, four appearances and one goal in UEFA Conference League)	1	—		15	3
Twente	Total		38	6	1	0	10	1	2	0	51	7
Groningen (loan)	2025–26	Eredivisie	33	5	1	1	—		—		34	6
Career total			134	30	2	1	10	1	4	1	150	33

== Honours ==
Morocco U23

- U-23 Africa Cup of Nations: 2023

Individual

- Eerste Divisie Team of the Year: 2022–23
