= Bas Kuipers =

Dutch footballer (born 1994)

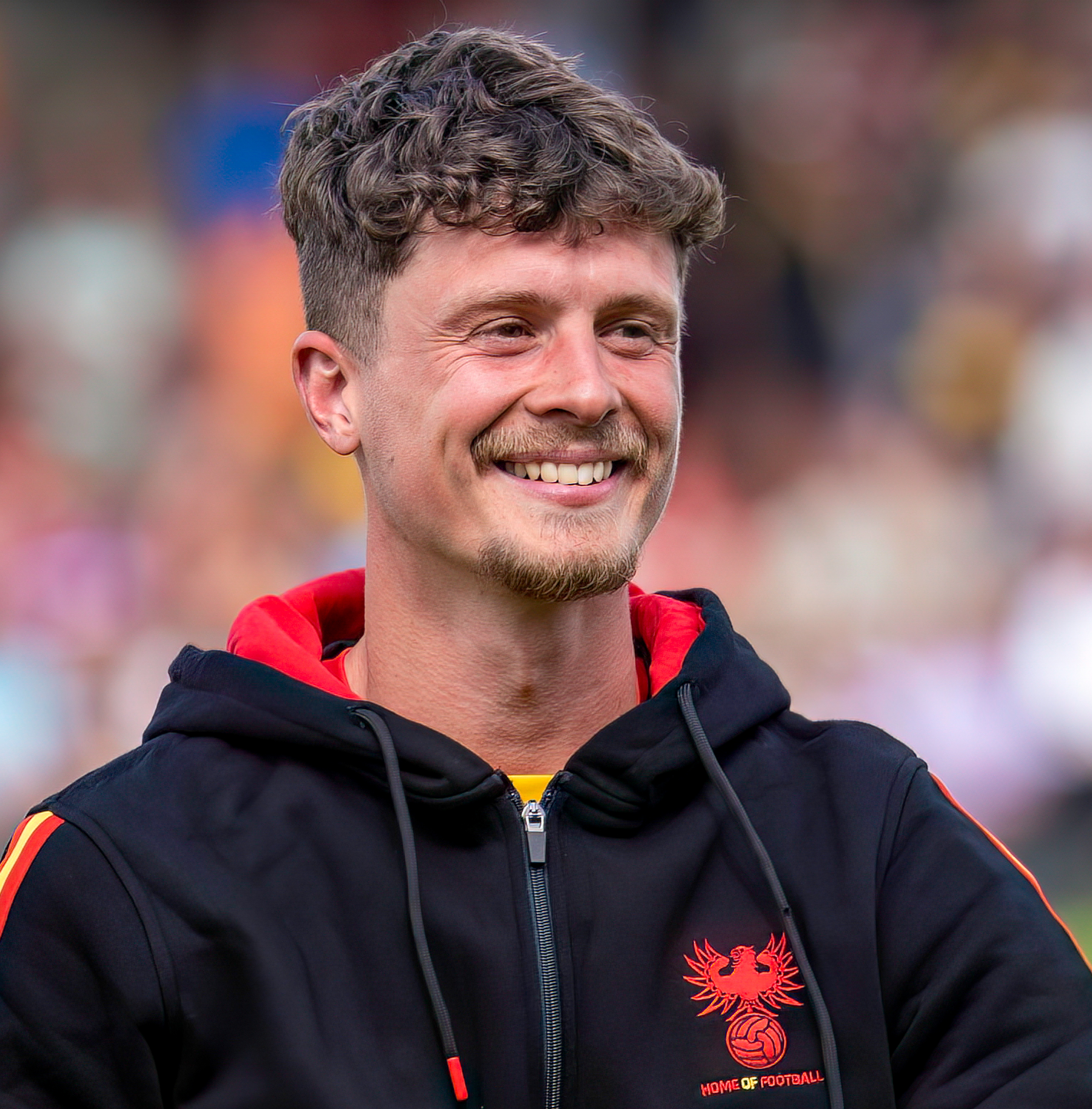
- Kuipers in 2023 with Go Ahead Eagles

Personal information
- Full name: Bas Edo Kuipers
- Date of birth: 17 August 1994 (age 32)
- Place of birth: Amsterdam, Netherlands
- Height: 1.80 m (5 ft 11 in)
- Position: Left-back

Team information
- Current team: Sparta Rotterdam
- Number: 5

Youth career
- 2001–2013: Ajax

Senior career*
Years	Team	Apps	(Gls)
2013–2015	Ajax	0	(0)
2013–2014	→ Jong Ajax	26	(1)
2014–2015	→ Excelsior (loan)	30	(0)
2015–2017	Excelsior	46	(0)
2017–2018	ADO Den Haag	9	(0)
2019	Viitorul Constanța	7	(0)
2019–2020	NEC	29	(0)
2020–2024	Go Ahead Eagles	122	(13)
2024–2026	Twente	39	(3)
2026	→ Arouca (loan)	17	(1)
2026–	Sparta Rotterdam	10	(0)

International career
2009–2010	Netherlands U16	6	(0)
2010	Netherlands U17	1	(0)
2014	Netherlands U20	1	(0)
2015	Netherlands U21	3	(0)
- * Club domestic league appearances and goals as of 25 October 2026

Bas Edo Kuipers (born 17 August 1994) is a Dutch professional footballer who plays as a left-back for Eredivisie club Sparta Rotterdam.

== Club career ==
=== Ajax ===
Born in Amsterdam, Kuipers was recruited into the youth academy of AFC Ajax in 2001 after having been discovered during the club's annual Talentendagen (Talent days) where young kids can come play football at Ajax for a chance to join the club's acclaimed youth academy. He joined the F1 Pupils selection at first from where he has advanced through every possible stage of the club's youth system. On 15 March 2013, Kuipers signed his first professional contract with Ajax, signing a two-year deal binding him to the club until 30 June 2015. Kuipers participated in the club's training camp during the pre-season, where he appeared in two friendly matches for the first team, namely against RKC Waalwijk on 13 July 2013, coming on in the 63' minute in the 5–1 victory at the Mandemakers Stadion, while also making an appearance in the pre-season friendly match in the 63' minute against De Graafschap which ended in a 3–0 victory on the same day.

The start of the 2013–14 season saw Kuipers beginning with the reserves team Jong Ajax who had recently been promoted to the Eerste Divisie, the 2nd tier of professional football in the Netherlands, having previously played in the Beloften Eredivisie. On 30 August 2013, Kuipers made his professional debut for the reserve team in a home match against Jong Twente. The match ended in a 2–1 victory for the Amsterdammers. On 8 September 2013, Kuipers wore the captain's armband for the first time for Jong Ajax in an away match against Achilles '29, which ended in a 2–1 loss.

=== Excelsior ===
On 4 August 2014, it was announced that Kuipers would join Excelsior from Rotterdam on a one-year loan deal. He made his first appearance for Excelsior on 2 November 2014 in a 3–3 draw against AZ in Alkmaar. Following a successful season with Excelsior where he made 30 regular season appearances, Kuipers then made a permanent transfer in the Summer of 2015, signing a two-year contract.

=== NEC ===
After a short spell in Romania with Viitorul Constanța in 2019, where he won the Romanian Cup and Romanian Super Cup, appearing in both matches, Kuipers returned to Holland in August 2019 signing for NEC in the Eerste Divisie on an initial trial. After a successful trial, Kuipers signed a one-year contract with NEC with the option for a further year. He played as a starter on left back during the 2019–20 season, but did not receive a contract extension and left the club as a free agent.

=== Go Ahead Eagles ===
On 6 July 2020, Kuipers signed a two-year contract with Go Ahead Eagles. He scored the crucial goal as Go Ahead Eagles defeated Excelsior 1–0 to secure promotion to the Eredivisie on 12 May 2021.

=== Twente ===
On 28 May 2024, Kuipers joined Twente on a four-season contract, beginning in the 2024–25 season.

==== Arouca (loan) ====
On 1 January 2026, after struggling for significant game-time during the first half of the 2025–26 campaign for Twente, Kuipers was sent on loan to Primeira Liga club Arouca until the end of the season.

=== Sparta Rotterdam ===
On 24 June 2026, Kuipers moved to Sparta Rotterdam on a two-year deal.

== International career ==
Kuipers made his debut for the Dutch national team playing for the under-16 selection in their 2009 appearance in the 11th Tournoi Val de Marne in Paris, France. His first appearance was on 29 October 2009 in a 1–2 loss against Spain U-16. Two days later he appeared in the 2–0 victory over Italy U-16 however failing to help his side secure advancement to the next round of the tournament. Two months later he appeared in the Nike International friendlies tournament '09 in Phoenix, Arizona playing in two fixtures, namely against Portugal U-16 on 5 December 2012, which ended in a 2–1 win, and against the United States U-16 which resulted in a 3–0 victory for the Dutch. His final two appearances for the under-16 squad were at the Albufeira 4 nations tournament in Portugal where his side would face Italy U-16 and Ireland U-16 losing the first match 3–1, while securing the 3–1 win in the following fixture. He received his first call up for the Netherlands U-17 appearing in a friendly match against Germany U-17 on 15 September 2010 in game which ended in a 2–1 loss for the Netherlands.

== Personal life ==
Kuipers is the nephew of the famous Dutch astronaut André Kuipers.

== Career statistics ==
As of 28 October 2026

Appearances and goals by club, season and competition
Club	Season	League			National cup (Note: Includes KNVB Cup, Cupa României)		Europe		Other		Total	
Club	Season	Division	Apps	Goals	Apps	Goals	Apps	Goals	Apps	Goals	Apps	Goals
Jong Ajax	2013–14	Eerste Divisie	26	1	—		—		—		26	1
Ajax	2013–14	Eredivisie	0	0	0	0	0	0	0	0	0	0
Excelsior (loan)	2014–15	Eredivisie	30	0	3	0	—		—		33	0
Excelsior	2015–16	Eredivisie	24	0	1	0	—		—		25	0
Excelsior	2016–17	Eredivisie	22	0	0	0	—		—		22	0
Excelsior	Total		76	0	4	0	0	0	0	0	80	0
ADO Den Haag	2017–18	Eredivisie	6	0	0	0	—		—		6	0
ADO Den Haag	2018–19	Eredivisie	3	0	1	0	—		—		4	0
ADO Den Haag	Total		9	0	1	0	0	0	0	0	10	0
Viitorul Constanța	2018–19	Liga I	6	0	1	0	—		—		7	0
Viitorul Constanța	2019–20	Liga I	1	0	0	0	—		1 (Note: Appearance in Supercupa României)	0	2	0
Viitorul Constanța	Total		7	0	1	0	0	0	1	0	9	0
NEC	2019–20	Eerste Divisie	29	0	1	0	—		—		30	0
Go Ahead Eagles	2020–21	Eerste Divisie	36	5	3	0	—		—		39	5
Go Ahead Eagles	2021–22	Eredivisie	30	0	4	0	—		—		34	0
Go Ahead Eagles	2022–23	Eredivisie	23	3	0	0	—		—		23	3
Go Ahead Eagles	2023–24	Eredivisie	35	5	3	0	—		—		38	5
Go Ahead Eagles	Total		124	13	10	0	0	0	0	0	134	13
Twente	2024–25	Eredivisie	32	3	2	1	7 (Note: One appearance in UEFA Champions League, six appearances in UEFA Europa League)	0	—		41	4
Twente	2025–26	Eredivisie	7	0	2	1	—		—		9	1
Twente	Total		39	3	4	2	7	0	—		50	5
Arouca (loan)	2025–26	Primeira Liga	17	1	—		—		—		17	1
Sparta Rotterdam	2026–27	Eredivisie	10	0	1	0	—		—		11	0
Career total			337	17	22	2	7	0	1	0	367	19

== Honours ==
Viitorul Constanța

- Cupa României: 2018–19
- Supercupa României: 2019

Individual

- Eredivisie Team of the Month: Agustus 2023
