= Juliën Mesbahi =

Moroccan footballer (born 2006)

Personal information
- Full name: Juliën Merijn Mesbahi
- Date of birth: 31 January 2006 (age 20)
- Place of birth: Enschede, Netherlands
- Height: 1.81 m (5 ft 11 in)
- Position: Centre-back

Team information
- Current team: Twente
- Number: 44

Youth career
- Avanti Wilskracht
- 2020–2023: Twente

Senior career*
Years	Team	Apps	(Gls)
2023–	Twente	3	(0)
2025–2026	→ Emmen (loan)	21	(0)

International career^{‡}
2021–2022	Netherlands U16	5	(0)
2022–2023	Netherlands U17	9	(0)
2023–2024	Netherlands U18	4	(0)
2025–	Morocco U20	3	(0)
- * Club domestic league appearances and goals as of 28 April 2026 ‡ National team caps and goals as of 5 September 2025

Juliën Merijn Mesbahi (born 31 January 2006) is a professional footballer who plays as a centre-back for Eredivisie club Twente. Born in the Netherlands, he is a youth international for Morocco.

== Career ==
Mesbahi is a youth product of Avanti Wilskracht before joining the youth academy of Twente in 2020. On 20 May 2021, he signed a contract with Twente's academy until 2024. On 20 June 2023, he signed a professional contract with Twente until 2026. He debuted with Twente as a substitute in a 3–0 Eredivisie win over Fortuna Sittard on 8 October 2023.

On 8 July 2025, Mesbahi was loaned by Emmen of Eerste Divisie.

== International career ==
Mesbahi was born in the Netherlands to a Moroccan father and Dutch mother. He is a former youth international for the Netherlands, having played up to the Netherlands U18s. In March 2025, he opted to play for the Morocco U20s. On 18 March, his request to switch international allegiance to Morocco was approved by FIFA.
