= Michel Vlap =

Dutch footballer (born 1997)

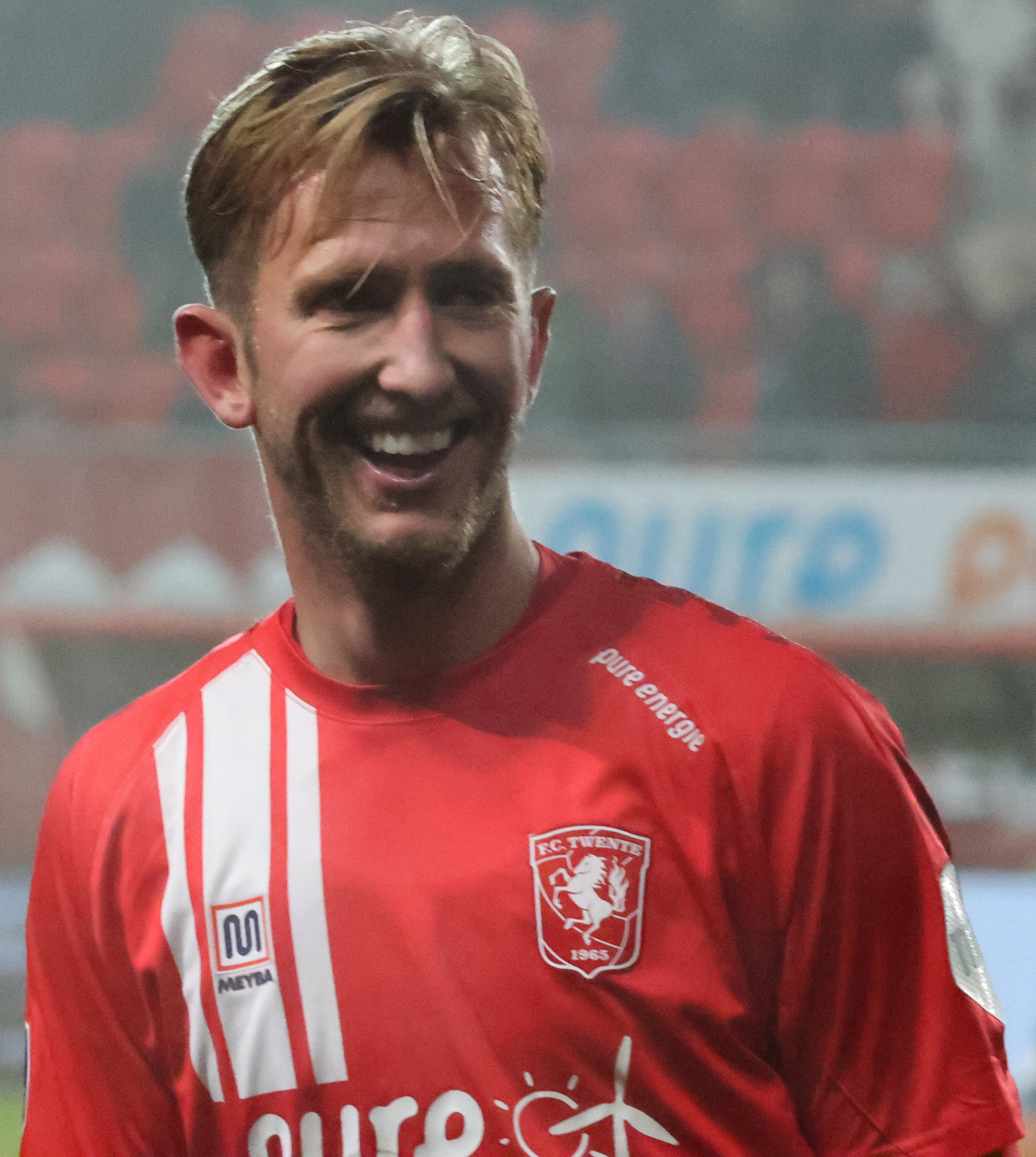

Personal information
- Date of birth: 2 June 1997 (age 29)
- Place of birth: Sneek, Netherlands
- Height: 1.91 m (6 ft 3 in)
- Position: Midfielder

Team information
- Current team: Al Ahli
- Number: 14

Youth career
- WSZ
- VV Sneek
- SC Heerenveen

Senior career*
Years	Team	Apps	(Gls)
2016–2019	SC Heerenveen	59	(20)
2019–2022	Anderlecht	34	(12)
2021	→ Arminia Bielefeld (loan)	7	(1)
2021–2022	→ Twente (loan)	34	(5)
2022–2025	Twente	101	(11)
2025–	Al Ahli	21	(9)

International career
2014–2015	Netherlands U18	5	(0)
2015–2016	Netherlands U19	5	(0)
2016	Netherlands U20	2	(0)
2018	Netherlands U21	3	(0)
- * Club domestic league appearances and goals as of 06:10, 15 June 2026 (UTC)

Michel Vlap (Dutch pronunciation: [miˈɕɛl ˈvlɑp]; born 2 June 1997) is a Dutch professional footballer who plays as a midfielder for Qatar Stars League club Al Ahli. He has represented the Netherlands internationally at various youth levels.

== Club career ==
=== Heerenveen ===
Vlap is an academy graduate of Eredivisie side Heerenveen and is the son of academy coach and former player Jan Vlap. Having progressed through the ranks of Heerenveen's youth academy, he signed his first professional contract on 17 February 2015, penning a three-year deal with the club. He later featured for Heerenveen during the 2015–16 pre-season and scored a brace in the club's 8–1 victory over VV Heerenveen in new manager Jurgen Streppel's first match in charge of the club. Vlap then made his senior debut for the club on 27 November 2016, coming on as a late, second-half substitute for Kosovan international Arbër Zeneli in a 1–0 Eredivisie loss to Ajax.

Vlap failed to appear again during the 2016–17 season but returned to the first team to make his KNVB Cup debut on 20 September 2017, coming on as a substitute in a 2–1 win over Excelsior. He scored his first goal for the club the following month, netting in a 2–1 defeat to AZ Alkmaar. On 3 December, he signed a new five-year contract with Heerenveen after impressing with a run of three goals in his previous five appearances for the club. He ultimately scored four goals in 26 appearances across all competitions for the campaign.

He continued to feature for the club the following season and in October 2018, after scoring a league-high four goals in the month, won the Eredevise Player of the Month award. By the end of the campaign, he had scored 16 goals and recorded six assists which earned him a transfer to Belgian side, Anderlecht.

=== Anderlecht and loans ===
In February 2021, Vlap moved to Bundesliga team Arminia Bielefeld from Anderlecht, on a loan deal until the end of the season. On 15 February, Vlap scored his first Bundesliga goal in the ninth minute of his debut, in a 3–3 away draw at Bayern Munich.

=== Twente ===
Vlap again moved on loan in August 2021, returning to the Eredivisie with Twente. He made his competitive debut for the Tukkers on the first matchday of the 2021–22 season, replacing Dimitrios Limnios in the 67th minute of a 2–1 away loss to Fortuna Sittard. He soon established himself as a starter for the club, and scored his first goal for Twente on 19 September in a 4–1 away victory against Vitesse. He played in all 34 league games that season, starting in 31 of them, as Twente secured a fourth-place finish and qualified for the third qualifying round of the UEFA Europa Conference League for the following season.

On 4 July 2022, Anderlecht and Twente agreed on a permanent transfer and Vlap signed a three-year contract with an option for an additional year. He scored on his European debut, helping Twente to a 3–1 away win over Serbian club Čukarički on 4 August.

=== Al-Ahli ===
On 10 August 2025, Vlap was transferred to Al Ahli in Qatar.

== International career ==
=== Netherlands national youth teams ===
Vlap has represented Netherlands at both under-18 and under-19 level. On 21 July 2016, while representing the Netherlands at the UEFA European Under-19 Championship, Vlap made history by becoming the first player ever to be brought on as a fourth substitute in a UEFA match when he replaced Laros Duarte in a 3–3 (5–4) penalty shoot-out loss to Germany. Regulations then ordinarily allowed a team to make only three substitutions during a match but a trial allowing for a fourth substitution in extra-time was introduced by the International Football Association Board for the tournament. This was since changed to five substitutions in 2020 due to the COVID-19 pandemic.

== Career statistics ==
As of match played on 25 May 2025

Appearances and goals by club, season and competition
Club	Season	League			Cup		Europe		Other		Total	
Club	Season	Division	Apps	Goals	Apps	Goals	Apps	Goals	Apps	Goals	Apps	Goals
Heerenveen	2016–17	Eredivisie	1	0	0	0	—		—		1	0
Heerenveen	2017–18	Eredivisie	24	4	2	0	—		—		26	4
Heerenveen	2018–19	Eredivisie	34	16	4	1	—		—		39	17
Heerenveen	Total		59	20	6	1	—		—		65	21
Anderlecht	2019–20	First Division A	23	11	2	0	—		—		25	11
Anderlecht	2020–21	First Division A	11	1	0	0	—		—		11	1
Anderlecht	Total		34	12	2	0	—		—		36	12
Arminia Bielefeld (loan)	2020–21	Bundesliga	7	1	0	0	—		—		7	1
Twente (loan)	2021–22	Eredivisie	34	5	2	0	—		—		36	5
Twente	2022–23	Eredivisie	32	3	1	0	4 (Note: Appearances in UEFA Europa Conference League)	2	4 (Note: Appearances in Eredivisie play-offs)	1	42	6
Twente	2023–24	Eredivisie	29	2	1	0	5	0	—		35	2
Twente	2024–25	Eredivisie	36	5	2	0	12 (Note: Two appearances and one goal in UEFA Champions League, ten appearances and one goal in UEFA Europa League)	2	—		50	7
Twente	Total		131	15	6	0	21	4	4	1	162	20
Career total			229	48	14	1	21	4	4	1	268	54

== Honours ==
Individual

- Eredivisie Talent of the Month: October 2018,
- Eredivisie Team of the Month: October 2024, November 2024
