= Youri Regeer =

Dutch footballer (born 2003)

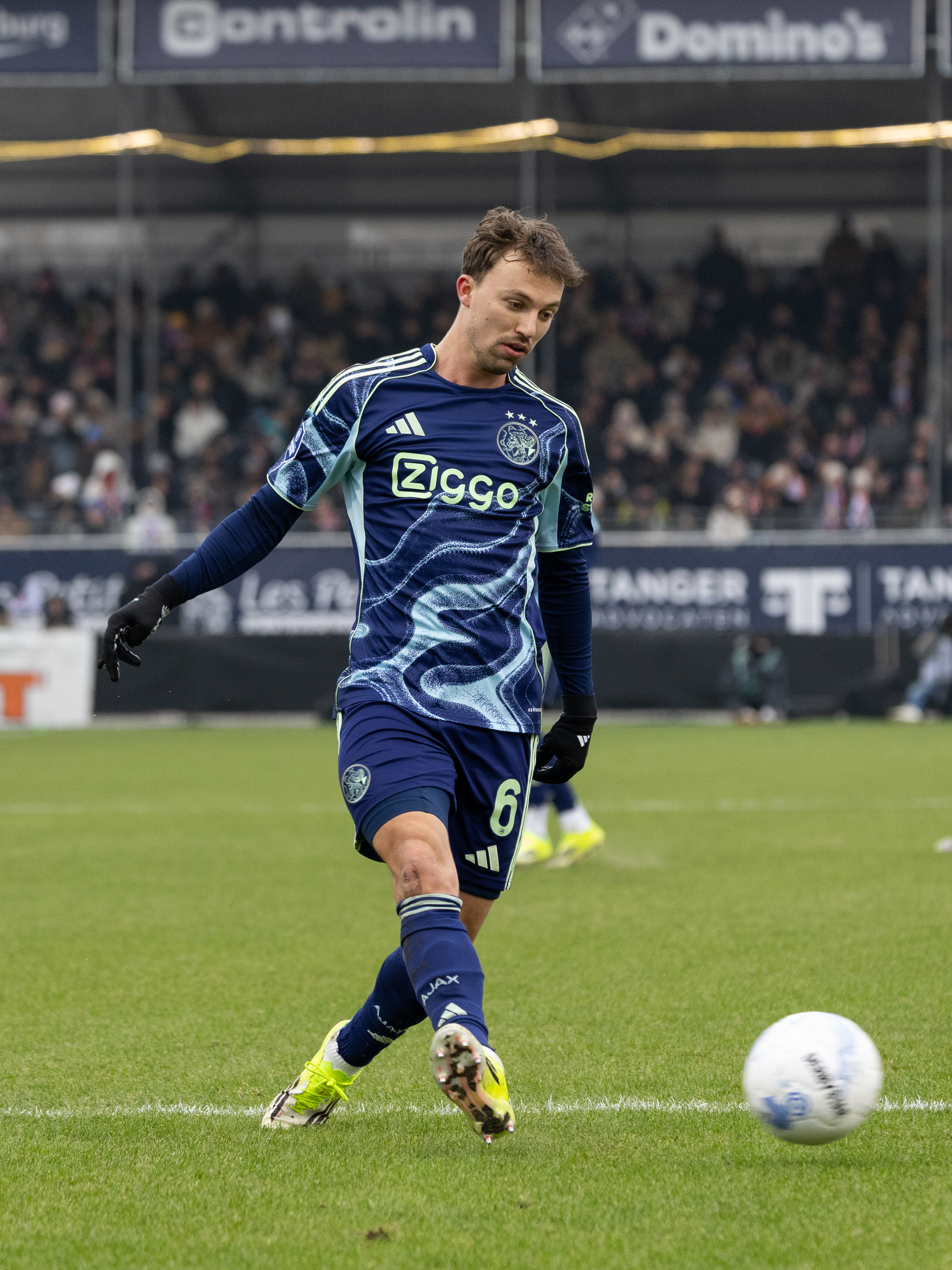
- Regeer with Ajax in 2026

Personal information
- Full name: Youri Pieter Regeer
- Date of birth: 18 August 2003 (age 23)
- Place of birth: Haarlem, Netherlands
- Height: 1.77 m (5 ft 10 in)
- Positions: Right-back; midfielder

Team information
- Current team: Werder Bremen (on loan from Ajax)
- Number: 44

Youth career
- –2012: SV Zandvoort
- 2012–2015: Rijnsburgse Boys
- 2015–2017: ADO Den Haag
- 2017–2020: Ajax

Senior career*
Years	Team	Apps	(Gls)
2020–2023	Jong Ajax	91	(6)
2021–2023	Ajax	6	(0)
2023–2025	Twente	51	(2)
2025–	Ajax	31	(1)
2026–	→ Werder Bremen (loan)	7	(0)

International career^{‡}
2017–2018	Netherlands U15	7	(0)
2018–2019	Netherlands U16	5	(2)
2019–	Netherlands U17	7	(1)
2019	Netherlands U18	3	(0)
2021	Netherlands U19	5	(0)
2023	Netherlands U20	1	(0)
2023–2025	Netherlands U21	15	(2)
- * Club domestic league appearances and goals as of 31 October 2026 ‡ National team caps and goals as of 25 June 2025

Youri Pieter Regeer (born 18 August 2003) is a Dutch professional footballer who plays as a right-back or midfielder for Bundesliga club Werder Bremen, on loan from Eredivisie club Ajax.

== Club career ==
=== Early career and Ajax ===
Regeer played youth football for SV Zandvoort and Rijnsburgse Boys before joining the academy of ADO Den Haag in 2015. In 2017, he moved to the Ajax youth setup. He made his professional debut for the reserve team, Jong Ajax, in the Eerste Divisie during the 2019–20 season. Regeer developed into a key player for Jong Ajax over the next few seasons, becoming one of the team captains and amassing 91 appearances and 6 goals for the side.

Regeer made his competitive first-team debut for Ajax on 15 December 2021, starting in a KNVB Cup match against BVV Barendrecht under manager Erik ten Hag. He scored his first senior goal later that season in the KNVB Cup semi-final against AZ Alkmaar on 3 March 2022. He made his Eredivisie debut on 30 April 2022 against PEC Zwolle. Despite being part of the squad that won the Eredivisie title in 2021–22, his first-team opportunities remained limited, totaling 8 appearances and 1 goal over two seasons.

=== FC Twente ===
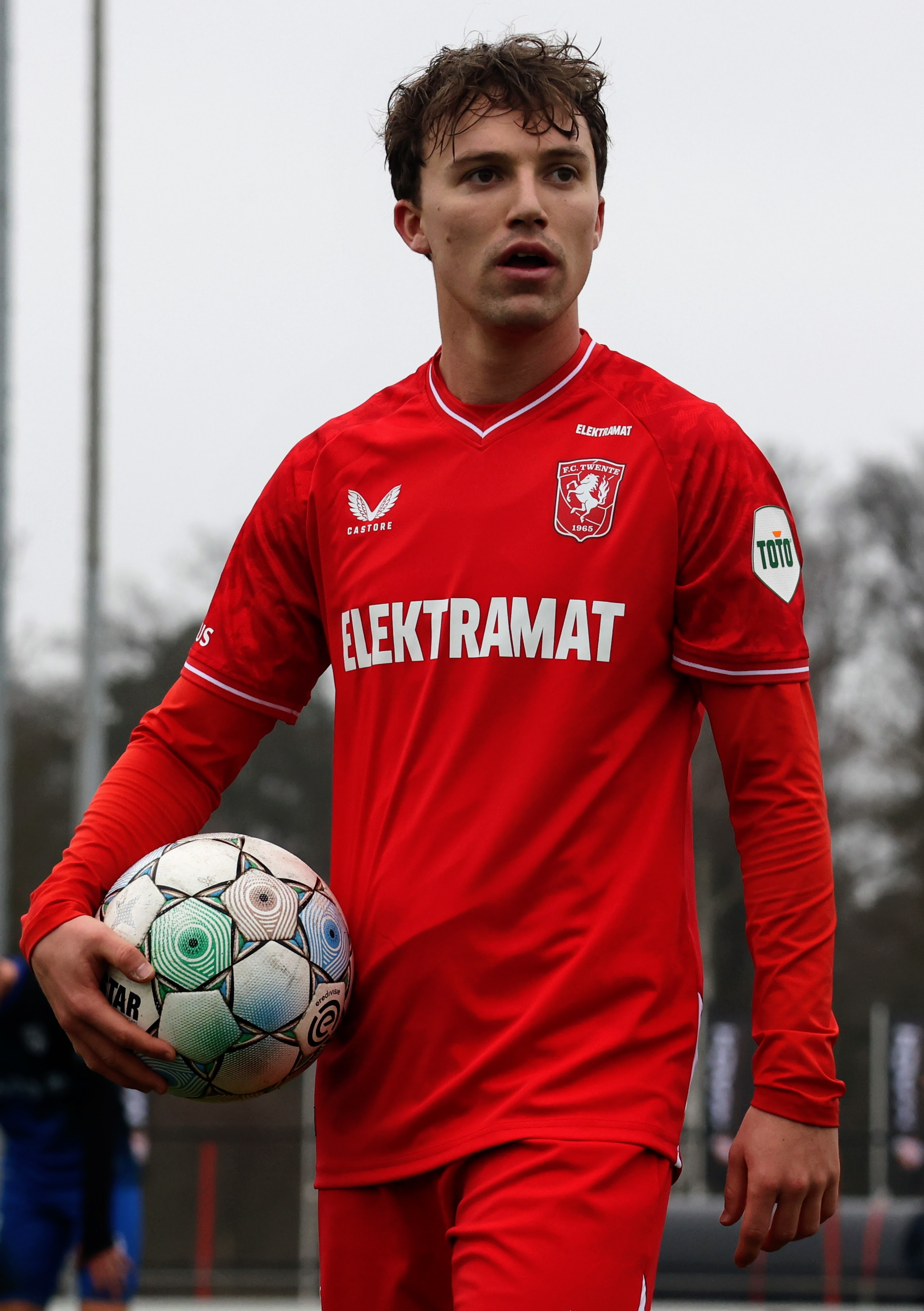
Regeer with Twente in 2024

On 9 June 2023, seeking more regular playing time, Regeer signed a four-year contract with Eredivisie club Twente. He quickly established himself as a key player for Twente during the 2023–24 season, featuring regularly as both a right-back and midfielder. His strong performances earned him the Eredivisie Talent of the Month award for September 2023, and he was also named in the Eredivisie Team of the Month for both September and October 2023. He continued as a regular starter in the first half of the 2024–25 season, ultimately making 63 appearances and scoring 1 league goal during his 18 months at the club.

=== Return to Ajax ===
On 24 January 2025, Regeer returned to Ajax after the club activated a reported €4.3 million buy-back clause included in his transfer to Twente. He signed a contract lasting until 30 June 2029. Upon his return, manager Francesco Farioli indicated he viewed Regeer primarily as a midfielder. He made his first appearance since returning on 2 February 2025 against Feyenoord.

On 31 August 2026, Regeer moved on loan to Werder Bremen in Germany for the 2026–27 season.

== International career ==
Regeer has represented the Netherlands at various youth international levels, from under-15 up to under-21. He played for the U17 team during the qualifying stages for the eventually cancelled 2020 UEFA European Under-17 Championship. He made his debut for the Netherlands U21 team on 8 September 2023. As of October 2024, he had earned 11 caps and scored 2 goals for the U21 side.

== Career statistics ==
=== Club ===
As of match played 31 October 2026

Appearances and goals by club, season and competition
Club	Season	League			KNVB Cup		Europe		Other		Total	
Club	Season	Division	Apps	Goals	Apps	Goals	Apps	Goals	Apps	Goals	Apps	Goals
Jong Ajax	2019–20	Eerste Divisie	3	0	–		–		–		3	0
Jong Ajax	2020–21	Eerste Divisie	37	0	–		–		–		37	0
Jong Ajax	2021–22	Eerste Divisie	25	5	–		–		–		25	5
Jong Ajax	2022–23	Eerste Divisie	26	1	–		–		–		26	1
Jong Ajax	Total		91	6	–		–		–		91	6
Ajax	2021–22	Eredivisie	3	0	2	1	0	0	–		5	1
Ajax	2022–23	Eredivisie	3	0	0	0	0	0	–		3	0
Ajax	Total		6	0	2	1	0	–	8	1		
Twente	2023–24	Eredivisie	32	2	1	0	5 (Note: Appearances in UEFA Conference League)	0	–		38	2
Twente	2024–25	Eredivisie	19	0	1	0	7 (Note: One appearance in UEFA Champions League, six appearances in UEFA Europa League)	0	–		27	0
Twente	Total		51	2	2	0	12	0	–		65	2
Ajax	2024–25	Eredivisie	4	1	0	0	0	0	–		4	1
Ajax	2025–26	Eredivisie	25	0	2	0	8 (Note: Appearances in UEFA Champions League)	0	1 (Note: Appearance in European play-offs)	0	36	0
Ajax	2026–27	Eredivisie	2	0	0	0	6	0	—		8	0
Ajax	Total		31	1	2	0	14	0	1	0	49	1
Jong Ajax	2024–25	Eerste Divisie	2	0	–		–		–		2	0
Jong Ajax	2025–26	Eerste Divisie	1	0	–		–		–		1	0
Jong Ajax	Total		3	0	–		–		–		3	0
SV Werder Bremen (loan)	2026–27	Bundesliga	7	0	1	0	–		–		8	0
Career total			189	9	7	1	26	0	1	0	223	10

== Honours ==
Ajax

- Eredivisie: 2021–22

Individual

- Eredivisie Talent of the Month: September 2023
- Eredivisie Team of the Month: September 2023, October 2023
