= 2014–15 PSV Eindhoven season =

PSV Eindhoven
2014–15 season
- General manager: Toon Gerbrands
- Head coach: Phillip Cocu
- Eredivisie: 1st
- KNVB Cup: Fourth round vs Roda JC
- Europa League: Round of 32 vs Zenit St.Petersburg
- Top goalscorer: League: Memphis Depay (22); All: Memphis Depay (27)
- Highest home attendance: 35,000 vs. Ajax (1 March 2015) vs. PEC Zwolle (10 April 2015) vs. Heerenveen (18 April 2015)
- Lowest home attendance: 30,200 vs. SC Cambuur (21 September 2014)
- Average home league attendance: 32,133 (18 April 2015)
| Home colours | Away colours | Third colours |

During the 2014–15 season PSV Eindhoven participated in the Dutch Eredivisie, the KNVB Cup, and the UEFA Europa League. The first training took place on Tuesday 24 June 2014. The traditional PSV Fan Day was held on Saturday 2 August 2014.

== Season summary ==
Estadio Municipal de Maspalomas
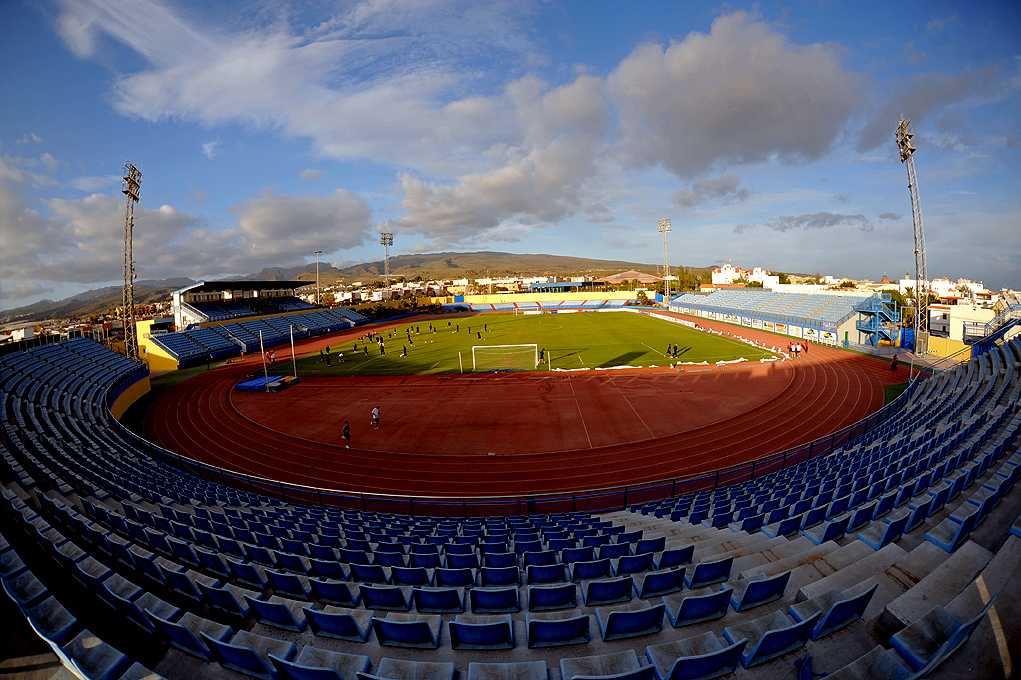
- Interactive map of Estadio Municipal de Maspalomas
- Location: (Spain) Maspalomas, Gran Canaria
- Coordinates: 27.765977°N 15.584070°W
- Owner: Municipality of San Bartolomé
- Capacity: 8,000

=== 2015 Maspalomas International Football Tournament ===
On 4 January, during the winter break, PSV left for a nine-day training camp on Gran Canaria, Spain. There, PSV participated in the XXX International Football Tournament of Maspalomas (es), a friendly football tournament held from 10 January to 13 January. The other participating teams were Celtic from Scotland and Sparta Prague from the Czech Republic. PSV defeated both teams, winning the Maspalomas trophy (es).

| Team | Pts | Pld | W | D | L | GF | GA | GD |
|---|---|---|---|---|---|---|---|---|
| PSV Eindhoven | 6 | 2 | 2 | 0 | 0 | 6 | 2 | +4 |
| Sparta Prague | 3 | 2 | 1 | 0 | 1 | 5 | 7 | -2 |
| Celtic | 0 | 2 | 0 | 0 | 2 | 2 | 4 | -2 |

| 10 January 2015 | PSV Eindhoven (Netherlands) | 1 – 0 | (Scotland) Celtic | Maspalomas, Spain |
| 12:15 WET (UTC+0) | Memphis 33' | Report | | Stadium: Municipal Stadium Maspalomas; Attendance: 1500; Referee: Jiménez González |

| 11 January 2015 | Sparta Prague (Czech Republic) | 2 – 5 | (Netherlands) PSV Eindhoven | Maspalomas, Spain |
| 16:00 WET (UTC+0) | Dočkal 35'; Lafata 36' | Report | Maher 44'; Memphis 65' de Jong 71', 75'; Wijnaldum 85' | Stadium: Municipal Stadium Maspalomas; Attendance: 1,200; Referee: Pulido Santana |

== First-team squad ==
Note: Flags indicate national team as defined under FIFA eligibility rules; some limited exceptions apply. Players may hold more than one non-FIFA nationality.

| No. | Pos. | Nation | Player |
|---|---|---|---|
| 1 | GK | NED | Jeroen Zoet |
| 2 | DF | FRA | Nicolas Isimat-Mirin (on loan from Monaco) |
| 3 | DF | NED | Karim Rekik (on loan from Manchester City) |
| 4 | DF | COL | Santiago Arias |
| 5 | DF | NED | Jeffrey Bruma |
| 6 | MF | NED | Adam Maher |
| 7 | FW | NED | Memphis Depay |
| 8 | MF | NED | Stijn Schaars (vice-captain) |
| 9 | FW | NED | Luuk de Jong |
| 10 | MF | NED | Georginio Wijnaldum (captain) |
| 11 | FW | NED | Luciano Narsingh |
| 14 | FW | SUR | Florian Jozefzoon |
| 15 | DF | NED | Jetro Willems |
| 17 | FW | NED | Jürgen Locadia |
| 18 | MF | MEX | Andrés Guardado (on loan from Valencia) |

| No. | Pos. | Nation | Player |
|---|---|---|---|
| 20 | DF | NED | Joshua Brenet |
| 21 | RW | BRA | Jason |
| 22 | GK | NED | Remko Pasveer |
| 23 | MF | NED | Rai Vloet |
| 24 | MF | AUT | Marcel Ritzmaier |
| 25 | DF | NED | Menno Koch |
| 26 | DF | NED | Clint Leemans |
| 27 | MF | SWE | Oscar Hiljemark |
| 28 | DF | NED | Abel Tamata |
| 29 | DF | NED | Jorrit Hendrix |
| 30 | DF | NED | Jordy de Wijs |
| 31 | GK | NED | Nigel Bertrams |
| 32 | FW | MNE | Aleksandar Boljević |
| 39 | FW | BEL | Zakaria Bakkali |
| 43 | FW | MNE | Boris Cmiljanić |
| 49 | FW | NED | Steven Bergwijn |

=== On loan ===
Note: Flags indicate national team as defined under FIFA eligibility rules; some limited exceptions apply. Players may hold more than one non-FIFA nationality.

| No. | Pos. | Nation | Player |
|---|---|---|---|
| 21 | GK | POL | Przemysław Tytoń (at Elche until 30 June 2015) |

== Transfers ==
=== Summer ===
In: Note: Flags indicate national team as defined under FIFA eligibility rules; some limited exceptions apply. Players may hold more than one non-FIFA nationality.

| No. | Pos. | Nation | Player |
|---|---|---|---|
| 2 | DF | FRA | Nicolas Isimat-Mirin (loan from (France) Monaco) |
| 3 | DF | NED | Karim Rekik (loan extended from (England) Manchester City) |
| 9 | FW | NED | Luuk de Jong (from (Germany) Borussia Mönchengladbach, previously on loan to (England) Newcastle United) |
| 18 | MF | MEX | Andrés Guardado (loan from (Spain) Valencia, previously on loan to (Germany) Bayer Leverkusen) |
| 22 | GK | NED | Remko Pasveer (from (Netherlands) Heracles Almelo) |
| 24 | DF | AUT | Marcel Ritzmaier (loan return from (Netherlands) Cambuur) |
| 32 | FW | MNE | Aleksandar Boljević (from (Montenegro) Zeta) |
| 43 | FW | MNE | Boris Cmiljanić (from (Montenegro) Budućnost Podgorica) |
| 21 | RW | BRA | Jason (from (France) Paris FC) |
| — | MF | SRB | Andrija Luković (from (Serbia) Rad) |

Out: Note: Flags indicate national team as defined under FIFA eligibility rules; some limited exceptions apply. Players may hold more than one non-FIFA nationality.

| No. | Pos. | Nation | Player |
|---|---|---|---|
| 1 | GK | POL | Przemysław Tytoń (loan to (Spain) Elche) |
| 2 | DF | DEN | Mathias Jørgensen (to (Denmark) Copenhagen) |
| 9 | FW | SLO | Tim Matavž (to (Germany) FC Augsburg) |
| 18 | DF | BEL | Timothy Derijck (to (Netherlands) ADO Den Haag, previously on loan to (Netherlands) Utrecht) |
| 20 | MF | NED | Peter van Ooijen (to (Netherlands) Go Ahead Eagles) |

== Competitions ==
=== Eredivisie ===
==== Results summary ====
| Overall | | | | | | | | Home | | | | | | Away | | | | | |
| Pld | W | D | L | GF | GA | GD | Pts | W | D | L | GF | GA | GD | W | D | L | GF | GA | GD |
|---|---|---|---|---|---|---|---|---|---|---|---|---|---|---|---|---|---|---|---|
| 34 | 29 | 1 | 4 | 92 | 31 | +61 | 88 | 16 | 0 | 1 | 50 | 12 | +38 | 13 | 1 | 3 | 42 | 19 | +23 |

==== Results by round ====
| Round | 1 | 2 | 3 | 4 | 5 | 6 | 7 | 8 | 9 | 10 | 11 | 12 | 13 | 14 | 15 | 16 | 17 | 18 | 19 | 20 | 21 | 22 | 23 | 24 | 25 | 26 | 27 | 28 | 29 | 30 | 31 | 32 | 33 | 34 |
|---|---|---|---|---|---|---|---|---|---|---|---|---|---|---|---|---|---|---|---|---|---|---|---|---|---|---|---|---|---|---|---|---|---|---|
| Ground | A | H | A | H | A | H | A | H | H | A | H | A | A | A | H | H | H | A | A | H | A | H | A | H | H | A | H | A | A | H | H | A | H | A |
| Result | W | W | W | W | L | W | L | W | W | W | W | W | D | W | W | W | W | W | W | W | W | W | W | W | L | W | W | L | W | W | W | W | W | W |
| Position | 3 | 1 | 1 | 1 | 1 | 1 | 1 | 1 | 1 | 1 | 1 | 1 | 1 | 1 | 1 | 1 | 1 | 1 | 1 | 1 | 1 | 1 | 1 | 1 | 1 | 1 | 1 | 1 | 1 | 1 | 1 | 1 | 1 | 1 |

Updated to match(es) played on 19 May 2015. Source: see below
A = Away; H = Home; W = Win; D = Draw; L = Loss

==== Matches ====
| 10 August 2014 1 | Willem II | 1 – 3 | PSV Eindhoven | Tilburg |
| 16:45 CEST (UTC+2) | Andrade 40' (yellow card) 61'; Messaoud (yellow card) 50'; Peters (yellow card) 68'; Lamprou (red card) 74' | Report | Locadia 7'; Memphis 10', 76' (pen.) | Stadium: Koning Willem II Stadion; Attendance: 11,200; Referee: Kevin Blom |

| 16 August 2014 2 | PSV Eindhoven | 6 – 1 | NAC Breda | Eindhoven |
| 18:30 CEST (UTC+2) | Wijnaldum 21', 57'; Damčevski 26' (o.g.); Memphis 51', 73'; Locadia 53' | Report | Tighadouini 31' (pen.) | Stadium: Philips Stadion; Attendance: 30,600; Referee: Bas Nijhuis |

| 24 August 2014 3 | Ajax | 1 – 3 | PSV Eindhoven | Amsterdam |
| 16:45 CEST (UTC+2) | El Ghazi 16' | Report | Rekik (yellow card) 12'; Memphis 52' (yellow card) 61'; Narsingh 63'; Jozefzoon 86' | Stadium: Amsterdam Arena; Attendance: 51,513; Referee: Bjorn Kuipers |

| 31 August 2014 4 | PSV Eindhoven | 2 – 0 | Vitesse Arnhem | Eindhoven |
| 12:30 CEST (UTC+2) | Maher (yellow card) 34' (goal) 90+1' de Jong 48'; Guardado (yellow card) 73'; Hiljemark (yellow card) 85' | Report | Kruiswijk (yellow card) 24'; Kashia (yellow card) 86' | Stadium: Philips Stadion; Attendance: 32,000; Referee: Kevin Blom |

| 13 September 2014 5 | PEC Zwolle | 3 – 1 | PSV Eindhoven | Zwolle |
| 20:45 CEST (UTC+2) | Broerse (yellow card) 32' (goal) 65'; Drost 41'; Lam (yellow card) 62'; Rienstra 87' | Report | de Jong 32' (pen.); Bruma (yellow card) 90' | Stadium: IJsseldelta Stadion; Attendance: 12,347; Referee: Danny Makkelie |

| 21 September 2014 6 | PSV Eindhoven | 4 – 0 | SC Cambuur | Eindhoven |
| 14:30 CEST (UTC+2) | Willems (yellow card) 13' (goal) 37' de Jong 21'; Bruma 78'; Maher 80' | Report | Bijker (yellow card) 21' (yellow-red card) 41' | Stadium: Philips Stadion; Attendance: 30,200; Referee: Reinold Wiedemeijer |

| 28 September 2014 7 | Heerenveen | 1 – 0 | PSV Eindhoven | Heerenveen |
| 16:45 CEST (UTC+2) | Marzo (red card) 33'; Sinkgraven (yellow card) 34' (goal) 78' | Report | Willems (yellow card) 41'; Jozefzoon (yellow card) 67'; Brenet (red card) 68' | Stadium: Abe Lenstra Stadion; Attendance: 25,632; Referee: Kevin Blom |

| 5 October 2014 8 | PSV Eindhoven | 3 – 0 | Excelsior | Eindhoven |
| 12:30 CEST (UTC+2) | Maher 35'; Narsingh 44'; Locadia 51'; Bruma (red card) 60' | Report | | Stadium: Philips Stadion; Attendance: 30,600; Referee: Serdar Gözübüyük |

| 18 October 2014 9 | PSV Eindhoven | 3 – 0 | AZ | Eindhoven |
| 18:30 CEST (UTC+2) | Narsingh 20'; Maher 29', 41' | Report | Luckassen (yellow card) 4'; Elm (yellow card) 47' | Stadium: Philips Stadion; Attendance: 31,400; Referee: Björn Kuipers |

| 26 October 2014 10 | Utrecht | 1 – 5 | PSV Eindhoven | Utrecht |
| 14:30 CET (UTC+1) | Kali (yellow card) 2'; Van Der Maarel (yellow card) 18' (yellow-red card) 22'; Boymans 50' | Report | Maher 12'; Willems (yellow card) 16'; Memphis 23' (pen.); Hendrix 25'; Bruma (yellow card) 75'; Kum 81' (o.g.); Wijnaldum 90+1' | Stadium: Stadion Galgenwaard; Attendance: 18,140; Referee: Bas Nijhuis |

| 1 November 2014 11 | PSV Eindhoven | 1 – 0 | ADO Den Haag | Eindhoven |
| 20:45 CET (UTC+1) | Hendrix (yellow card) 6' (yellow-red card) 29'; Memphis 49' | Report | | Stadium: Philips Stadion; Attendance: 30,800; Referee: Pol van Boekel |

| 9 November 2014 12 | Heracles | 1 – 2 | PSV Eindhoven | Almelo |
| 16:45 CET (UTC+1) | Linssen 29'; Veldmate (yellow card) 34'; Telgenkamp (yellow card) 90+2' | Report | de Jong 45'; Rekik 90+2' | Stadium: Polman Stadion; Attendance: 8,437; Referee: Richard Liesveld |

| 23 November 2014 13 | Groningen | 1 – 1 | PSV Eindhoven | Groningen |
| 12:30 CET (UTC+1) | Hateboer (yellow card) 47'; Botteghin (yellow card) 55'; De Leeuw 83' | Report | Arias (yellow card) 45+1' de Jong 57' | Stadium: Euroborg; Attendance: 20,690; Referee: Serdar Gözübüyük |

| 30 November 2014 14 | PSV Eindhoven | Postponed | Feyenoord | Eindhoven |
| 16:45 CET (UTC+1) | | [ Report] | | Stadium: Philips Stadion |

| 6 December 2014 15 | Dordrecht | 1 – 3 | PSV Eindhoven | Dordrecht |
| 20:45 CET (UTC+1) | Lieder 6'; Ojo (yellow card) 35'; Haddad (yellow card) 50' (yellow-red card) 67' | Report | Wijnaldum 21', 58' de Jong 45+1'; Memphis (yellow card) 50'; Willems (yellow card) 55' | Stadium: GN Bouw Stadion; Attendance: 3,902; Referee: Dennis Higler |

| 14 December 2014 16 | PSV Eindhoven | 2 – 0 | Twente | Eindhoven |
| 14:30 CET (UTC+1) | de Jong 21'; Maher (yellow card) 38'; Wijnaldum 45+1' | Report | Bjelland (yellow card) 25'; Martina (yellow card) 36'; Ziyech (yellow card) 74' | Stadium: Philips Stadion; Attendance: 31,400; Referee: Kevin Blom |

| 17 December 2014 14 | PSV Eindhoven | 4 – 3 | Feyenoord | Eindhoven |
| 20:45 CET (UTC+1) | de Jong 22', 60', 63'; Willems (yellow card) 77'; Memphis 90+3' | Report | Manu 13'; El Ahmadi (yellow card) 13' (goal) 42'; Wilkshire (yellow card) 15'; Nelom (yellow card) 27'; Clasie (yellow card) 74'; Kazim-Richards 89' | Stadium: Philips Stadion; Attendance: 34,500; Referee: Björn Kuipers |

| 20 December 2014 17 | PSV Eindhoven | 5 – 0 | Go Ahead Eagles | Eindhoven |
| 20:45 CET (UTC+1) | Arias 14'; Memphis 33', 79'; Narsingh (yellow card) 71'; Locadia 90'; Jozefzoon 90+1' | Report | | Stadium: Philips Stadion; Attendance: 32,500; Referee: Bas Nijhuis |

| 17 January 2015 18 | Vitesse Arnhem | 0 – 1 | PSV Eindhoven | Arnhem |
| 20:45 CET (UTC+1) | Wallace (yellow card) 82'; Achenteh (yellow card) 89' | Report | Maher 10' (yellow card) 61'; Willems (yellow card) 82' | Stadium: GelreDome; Attendance: 17,894; Referee: Serdar Gözübüyük |

| 24 January 2015 19 | Cambuur | 1 – 2 | PSV Eindhoven | Leeuwarden |
| 18:30 CET (UTC+1) | El Makrini (yellow card) 20'; Mac-Intosch (yellow card) 24' de Ridder 90+2' | Report | Rekik (yellow card) 17'; Wijnaldum 39'; Willems (yellow card) 60'; Memphis 74' | Stadium: Cambuur Stadion; Attendance: 9,911; Referee: Pol van Boekel |

| 31 January 2015 20 | PSV Eindhoven | 2 – 1 | Willem II | Eindhoven |
| 18:30 CET (UTC+1) | Locadia 84'; Memphis (penalty missed) 76' 87' | Report | Braber 30' (yellow card) 57'; Dijks (yellow card) 53'; Cabral (yellow card) 86' | Stadium: Philips Stadion; Attendance: 33,000; Referee: Tom van Sichem |

| 3 February 2015 21 | NAC Breda | 0 – 2 | PSV Eindhoven | Breda |
| 20:45 CET (UTC+1) | Koch (yellow card) 4' | Report | Willems (red card) 1'; Memphis 53'; Wijnaldum 74' | Stadium: Rat Verlegh Stadion; Attendance: 18,200; Referee: Kevin Blom |

| 7 February 2015 22 | PSV Eindhoven | 3 – 1 | Utrecht | Eindhoven |
| 20:45 CET (UTC+1) | Narsingh 47'; Memphis 51', 90+1'; Willems (yellow card) 89' | Report | Janssen (yellow card) 49'; Leeuwin (yellow card) 64'; Ayoub 70'; Hardeveld (yellow card) 90' | Stadium: Philips Stadion; Attendance: 31,000; Referee: Danny Makkelie |

| 13 February 2015 23 | AZ | 2 – 4 | PSV Eindhoven | Alkmaar |
| 20:00 CET (UTC+1) | Henriksen 40'; Mühren 49' | Report | de Jong 3', 8', 60'; Wijnaldum 58'; Rekik (yellow card) 14' | Stadium: AFAS Stadion; Attendance: 17,081; Referee: Bas Nijhuis |

| 22 February 2015 24 | PSV Eindhoven | 3 – 0 | Dordrecht | Eindhoven |
| 14:30 CET (UTC+1) | Fortes 4' (o.g.); Bruma 70' de Jong 62' (pen.) | Report | Pisas (yellow card) 56'; Haddad (yellow card) 60' | Stadium: Philips Stadion; Attendance: 31,000; Referee: Pieter Vink |

| 1 March 2015 25 | PSV Eindhoven | 1 – 3 | Ajax | Eindhoven |
| 16:45 CET (UTC+1) | de Jong 77'; Arias (yellow card) 90+2' | Report | Kishna 29'; Viergever (yellow card) 45+1'; Schöne 83'; El Ghazi (yellow card) 72' (goal) 90+1' | Stadium: Philips Stadion; Attendance: 35,000; Referee: Danny Makkelie |

| 7 March 2015 26 | Go Ahead Eagles | 0 – 3 | PSV Eindhoven | Deventer |
| 20:00 CET (UTC+1) | Reimerink (yellow card) 76' | Report | Memphis 23'; Van der Linden 39' (o.g.); Guardado 44' | Stadium: Adelaarshorst; Attendance: 8,008; Referee: Richard Liesveld |

| 15 March 2015 27 | PSV Eindhoven | 2 – 1 | Groningen | Eindhoven |
| 14:30 CET (UTC+1) | Wijnaldum 11'; Brenet (yellow card) 18' de Jong (penalty missed) 27'; Isimat-Mirin 66'; Hendrix (yellow card) 72' | Report | Kappelhof (yellow card) 26'; Botteghin 43'; Lindgren (yellow card) 56'; Kieftenbeld (yellow card) 73' | Stadium: Philips Stadion; Attendance: 33,000; Referee: Dennis Higler |

| 22 March 2015 28 | Feyenoord | 2 – 1 | PSV Eindhoven | Rotterdam |
| 14:30 CET (UTC+1) | Clasie (yellow card) 24'; Achahbar 59', 63' | Report | Willems (yellow card) 30'; Memphis 68' | Stadium: De Kuip; Attendance: 45,000; Referee: Pol van Boekel |

| 4 April 2015 29 | Twente | 0 – 5 | PSV Eindhoven | Enschede |
| 20:45 CET (UTC+1) | | Report | de Jong 29'; Bruma 34'; Wijnaldum 45+1'; Memphis 75', 78' | Stadium: De Grolsch Veste; Attendance: 29,900; Referee: Richard Liesveld |

| 10 April 2015 30 | PSV Eindhoven | 3 – 1 | PEC Zwolle | Eindhoven |
| 20:00 CET (UTC+1) | Wijnaldum 12'; Brenet 50' de Jong 90+4' | Report | van der Werff 34' van Polen (yellow card) 68'; Necid (yellow card) 70'; Nijland (yellow card) 86' | Stadium: Philips Stadion; Attendance: 35,000; Referee: Björn Kuipers |

| 18 April 2015 31 | PSV Eindhoven | 4 – 1 | Heerenveen | Eindhoven |
| 19:45 CET (UTC+1) | de Jong 3', 41'; Memphis 23'; Narsingh 88' | Report | Marzo (yellow card) 14' van den Berg 27'; Slagveer (yellow card) 56' de Roon (yellow card) 85' | Stadium: Philips Stadion; Attendance: 35,000; Referee: Serdar Gözübüyük |

| 25 April 2015 32 | Excelsior | 2 – 3 | PSV Eindhoven | Rotterdam |
| 20:45 CET (UTC+1) | Gouriye (yellow card) 25' de Jong 51' (o.g.); Stans 73' (pen.) | Report | Isimat-Mirin (yellow card) 66' (yellow-red card) 72'; Wijnaldum 45+1'; Guardado (yellow card) 72'; Memphis 75'; Tamata (yellow card) 77'; Locadia 90+1' | Stadium: Stadion Woudestein; Referee: Bas Nijhuis |

| 10 May 2015 33 | PSV Eindhoven | 2 – 0 | Heracles | Eindhoven |
| 14:30 CET (UTC+1) | Memphis 32'; Willems 64' | Report | Weghorst (yellow card) 33'; Breukers (yellow card) 82' | Stadium: Philips Stadion; Attendance: 33,300; Referee: Ed Janssen |

| 17 May 2015 34 | ADO Den Haag | 2 – 3 | PSV Eindhoven | The Hague |
| 14:30 CET (UTC+1) | Yakovenko 24'; Bakker 56' | Report | Narsingh 45' de Jong 61'; Wijnaldum 90+1' | Stadium: Kyocera Stadion; Attendance: 14,937; Referee: Kevin Blom |

==== League table ====
| Pos | Team | Pld | W | D | L | GF | GA | GD | Pts | Qualification or relegation |
|---|---|---|---|---|---|---|---|---|---|---|
| 1 | PSV (C) | 34 | 29 | 1 | 4 | 92 | 31 | +61 | 88 | Qualification for the Champions League group stage |
| 2 | Ajax | 34 | 21 | 8 | 5 | 69 | 29 | +40 | 71 | Qualification for the Champions League third qualifying round |
| 3 | AZ | 34 | 19 | 5 | 10 | 63 | 56 | +7 | 62 | Qualification for the Europa League third qualifying round |
| 4 | Feyenoord | 34 | 17 | 8 | 9 | 56 | 39 | +17 | 59 | Qualification for the European competition play-offs |
| 5 | Vitesse (O) | 34 | 16 | 10 | 8 | 66 | 43 | +23 | 58 | Qualification for the European competition play-offs |

Source: NUsport
Rules for classification: 1) points; 2) goal difference; 3) number of goals scored
(C) Champions; (O) Play-off winners

=== KNVB Cup ===
| 25 September 2014 Second round | PSV Eindhoven | 2 – 0 | Utrecht | Eindhoven |
| 20:45 CEST (UTC+2) | Willems 2'; Y.Cortie 18' (o.g.) | Report | | Stadium: Philips Stadion; Attendance: 18,000; Referee: Eric Braamhaar |

| 29 October 2014 Third round | Almere City | 1 – 5 | PSV Eindhoven | Almere |
| 18:30 CET (UTC+1) | Keller 43'; Toet (yellow card) 44' | Report | Narsingh 17'; Wijnaldum 49' 86'; Locadia 70' 73' | Stadium: Mitsubishi Forklift Stadion; Attendance: 2,612; Referee: Ed Janssen |

| 20 January 2014 Fourth Round | Roda JC | 3 – 2 (a.e.t.) | PSV Eindhoven | Kerkrade |
| 20:00 CET (UTC+1) | Van Hyfte 5' (yellow card) 118'; Gyasi 74'; Faik 98' | Report | de Jong 17', 83'; Guardado (yellow card) 115' | Stadium: Parkstad Limburg Stadion; Attendance: 9,440; Referee: Richard Liesveld |

=== UEFA Europa League ===
==== Qualifying Stages ====
| 31 July 2014 Third qualifying round 1st leg | PSV Eindhoven (Netherlands) | 1 – 0 | (Austria) St. Pölten | Eindhoven, Netherlands |
| 19:00 CEST (UTC+2) | De Jong 56' (yellow card) 80'; Jozefzoon (yellow card) 90' (yellow-red card) 90+2' | Report | Segovia (yellow card) 30' | Stadium: Philips Stadion; Attendance: 22,000; Referee: Slavko Vinčić (Slovenia) |

| 7 August 2014 Third qualifying round 2nd leg | St. Pölten (Austria) | 2 – 3 (2 – 4 agg.) | (Netherlands) PSV Eindhoven | Sankt Pölten, Austria |
| 19:00 CET (UTC+1) | Segovia 56'; Kerschbaumer 90'; Hartl (yellow card) 90+2' | Report | Locadia 28'; Memphis 69'; De Jong 70'; Bruma (yellow card) 85' | Stadium: NV Arena; Attendance: 8,000; Referee: Artur Soares Dias (Portugal) |

| 21 August 2014 Play-off round 1st leg | PSV Eindhoven (Netherlands) | 1 – 0 | (Belarus) Shakhtyor Soligorsk | Eindhoven, Netherlands |
| 18:45 CET (UTC+1) | Maher 59' | Report | Kuzmyanok (yellow card) 66'; Starhorodskyi (yellow card) 70'; Kashewski (yellow card) 73' | Stadium: Philips Stadion; Attendance: 15,120; Referee: Cristian Balaj (Romania) |

| 28 August 2014 Play-off round 2nd leg | Shakhtyor Soligorsk (Belarus) | 0 – 2 (0 – 3 agg.) | (Netherlands) PSV Eindhoven | Barysaw, Belarus |
| 19:00 CET (UTC+1) | Ryas (yellow card) 70'; Yanush (yellow card) 77' | Report | Brenet (yellow card) 64'; Memphis 89', 90+3' | Stadium: Borisov Arena; Attendance: =5,500; Referee: Simon Lee Evans (Wales) |

==== Group stage ====
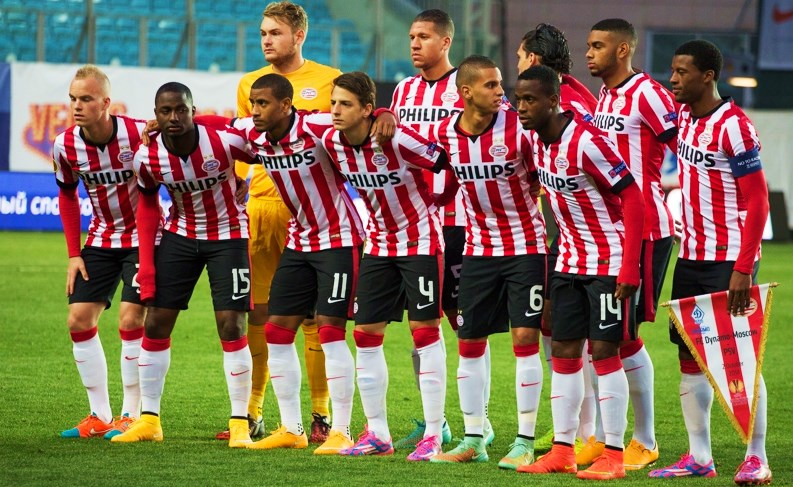
PSV squad before the Europa League game against Dynamo Moscow on 2 October 2014

| Pos | Team | Pld | W | D | L | GF | GA | GD | Pts | Qualification | DYM | PSV | EST | PAN |
|---|---|---|---|---|---|---|---|---|---|---|---|---|---|---|
| 1 | (Russia) Dynamo Moscow | 6 | 6 | 0 | 0 | 9 | 3 | +6 | 18 | Advance to knockout phase | — | 1–0 | 1–0 | 2–1 |
| 2 | (Netherlands) PSV Eindhoven | 6 | 2 | 2 | 2 | 8 | 8 | 0 | 8 | Advance to knockout phase | 0–1 | — | 1–0 | 1–1 |
| 3 | (Portugal) Estoril | 6 | 1 | 2 | 3 | 7 | 8 | −1 | 5 | | 1–2 | 3–3 | — | 2–0 |
| 4 | (Greece) Panathinaikos | 6 | 0 | 2 | 4 | 6 | 11 | −5 | 2 | | 1–2 | 2–3 | 1–1 | — |

Source: Soccerway
Rules for classification: Group stage tiebreakers

| 18 September 2014 1 | PSV Eindhoven (Netherlands) | 1 – 0 | (Portugal) Estoril | Eindhoven, Netherlands |
| 19:00 CEST (UTC+2) | de Jong 26' (pen.) | Report | Sebá (yellow card) 61'; Mano (yellow card) 85'; Emídio Rafael (yellow card) 85' | Stadium: Philips Stadion; Referee: Bobby Madden (Scotland) |

| 2 October 2014 2 | Dynamo Moscow (Russia) | 1 – 0 | (Netherlands) PSV Eindhoven | Khimki, Russia |
| 18:00 CEST (UTC+2) | Douglas (yellow card) 90+2'; Zhirkov 90+3' | Report | Arias (yellow card) 49'; Maher (yellow card) 60'; Jozefzoon (yellow card) 76' | Stadium: Arena Khimki; Referee: Marcin Borski (Poland) |

| 23 October 2014 3 | PSV Eindhoven (Netherlands) | 1 – 1 | (Greece) Panathinaikos | Philips Stadion |
| 21:05 CEST (UTC+2) | Memphis 44' (yellow card) 44'; Bruma (yellow card) 70' (yellow-red card) 89' | Report | Bouy (yellow card) 51'; Karelis 87'; Ajagun (yellow card) 90+2' | Attendance: 22,000; Referee: Miroslav Zelinka (Czech Republic) |

| 6 November 2014 4 | Panathinaikos (Greece) | 2 – 3 | (Netherlands) PSV Eindhoven | Athens, Greece |
| 19:00 CET (UTC+1) | Ajagun 11'; Lagos (yellow card) 22'; Zeca (yellow card) 36'; Petrić 43' (yellow card) 56'; Berg (yellow card) 80' | Report | Guardado (yellow card) 18'; Memphis 27'; De Jong 65'; Wijnaldum 78' | Stadium: Leoforos Alexandras Stadium; Attendance: 19,500; Referee: Marijo Strahonja (Croatia) |

| 27 November 2014 5 | Estoril (Portugal) | 3 – 3^{1} | (Netherlands) PSV Eindhoven | Estoril, Portugal |
| 21:05 CET (UTC+1) | Tozé 12'; Kuca 30'; Amado 39'; Rúben (yellow card) 80' | Report | Memphis 6'; Narsingh 14'; Wijnaldum 82'; Guardado (yellow card) 89'; Willems (yellow card) 89' | Stadium: Estádio António Coimbra da Mota; Attendance: 3,700; Referee: Martin Strömbergsson (Sweden) |

| 11 December 2014 6 | PSV Eindhoven (Netherlands) | 0 – 1 | (Russia) Dynamo Moscow | Eindhoven, Netherlands |
| 19:00 CET (UTC+1) | Isimat-Mirin (yellow card) 75' | Report | Vainqueur (yellow card) 28'; Kozlov (yellow card) 64'; Ionov 89' | Stadium: Philips Stadion; Referee: István Vad (Hungary) |

==== Knockout stage ====
| 19 February 2015 Round of 32 1st leg | PSV Eindhoven (Netherlands) | 0 – 1 | (Russia) Zenit St.Petersburg | Eindhoven, Netherlands |
| 19:00 CET (UTC+1) | Memphis (yellow card) 84' | Report | Smolnikov (yellow card) 32'; Hulk 64'; Ryazantsev (yellow card) 83'; Garay (yellow card) 84'; Danny (yellow card) 90' | Stadium: Philips Stadion; Attendance: 21,000; Referee: Paolo Tagliavento (Italy) |

| 26 February 2015 Round of 32 2nd leg | Zenit St.Petersburg (Russia) | 3 – 0 (4 – 0 agg.) | (Netherlands) PSV Eindhoven | Saint Petersburg, Russia |
| 21:00 CET (UTC+1) | Rondón 29', 67'; Hulk 48'; Shatov (yellow card) 70' | Report | Brenet (yellow card) 20'; Guardado (yellow card) 36'; Wijnaldum (yellow card) 45+2' | Stadium: Petrovsky Stadium; Referee: Cüneyt Çakır (Turkey) |

== Player statistics ==
As of match played 17 May 2015

=== Appearances and goals ===
| No. | Pos | Nat | Player | Total | | Eredivisie | | KNVB Cup | | Europa League | |
| No. | Pos | Nat | Player | Apps | Goals | Apps | Goals | Apps | Goals | Apps | Goals |
|---|---|---|---|---|---|---|---|---|---|---|---|
| 1 | GK | (Netherlands) NED | Jeroen Zoet | 39 | 0 | 32 | 0 | 0 | 0 | 7 | 0 |
| 2 | DF | (France) FRA | Nicolas Isimat-Mirin | 23 | 1 | 10+5 | 1 | 3 | 0 | 3+2 | 0 |
| 3 | DF | (Netherlands) NED | Karim Rekik | 36 | 1 | 29 | 1 | 1 | 0 | 6 | 0 |
| 4 | DF | (Colombia) COL | Santiago Arias | 27 | 1 | 19+2 | 1 | 2+1 | 0 | 2+1 | 0 |
| 5 | DF | (Netherlands) NED | Jeffrey Bruma | 41 | 3 | 28+2 | 3 | 2 | 0 | 9 | 0 |
| 6 | MF | (Netherlands) NED | Adam Maher | 45 | 8 | 31+1 | 7 | 2+1 | 0 | 9+1 | 1 |
| 7 | FW | (Netherlands) NED | Memphis Depay | 39 | 27 | 30 | 22 | 1 | 0 | 7+1 | 5 |
| 8 | MF | (Netherlands) NED | Stijn Schaars | 2 | 0 | 0+2 | 0 | 0 | 0 | 0 | 0 |
| 9 | FW | (Netherlands) NED | Luuk de Jong | 44 | 25 | 32 | 20 | 1+1 | 2 | 9+1 | 3 |
| 10 | MF | (Netherlands) NED | Georginio Wijnaldum | 42 | 17 | 32+1 | 14 | 1+2 | 2 | 5+1 | 1 |
| 11 | FW | (Netherlands) NED | Luciano Narsingh | 44 | 8 | 31+1 | 6 | 2+1 | 1 | 7+2 | 1 |
| 14 | FW | (Netherlands) NED | Florian Jozefzoon | 21 | 2 | 4+11 | 2 | 2 | 0 | 1+3 | 0 |
| 15 | DF | (Netherlands) NED | Jetro Willems | 39 | 3 | 30 | 2 | 3 | 1 | 6 | 0 |
| 17 | FW | (Netherlands) NED | Jürgen Locadia | 34 | 9 | 5+17 | 6 | 3 | 2 | 6+3 | 1 |
| 18 | MF | (Mexico) MEX | Andrés Guardado | 33 | 1 | 26+1 | 1 | 1 | 0 | 5 | 0 |
| 20 | DF | (Netherlands) NED | Joshua Brenet | 28 | 1 | 12+5 | 1 | 1+1 | 0 | 8+1 | 0 |
| 22 | GK | (Netherlands) NED | Remko Pasveer | 8 | 0 | 2 | 0 | 3 | 0 | 3 | 0 |
| 23 | MF | (Netherlands) NED | Rai Vloet | 10 | 0 | 0+7 | 0 | 0+1 | 0 | 0+2 | 0 |
| 24 | DF | (Austria) AUT | Marcel Ritzmaier | 15 | 0 | 0+5 | 0 | 3 | 0 | 2+5 | 0 |
| 25 | DF | (Netherlands) NED | Menno Koch | 1 | 0 | 0+1 | 0 | 0 | 0 | 0 | 0 |
| 27 | MF | (Sweden) SWE | Oscar Hiljemark | 15 | 0 | 2+8 | 0 | 0 | 0 | 5 | 0 |
| 28 | DF | (Netherlands) NED | Abel Tamata | 12 | 0 | 5+2 | 0 | 0 | 0 | 4+1 | 0 |
| 29 | DF | (Netherlands) NED | Jorrit Hendrix | 31 | 1 | 12+8 | 1 | 2 | 0 | 6+3 | 0 |
| 32 | FW | (Montenegro) MNE | Aleksandar Boljević | 1 | 0 | 0+1 | 0 | 0 | 0 | 0 | 0 |
| 48 | DF | (Netherlands) NED | Suently Alberto | 1 | 0 | 0+1 | 0 | 0 | 0 | 0 | 0 |
| 49 | FW | (Netherlands) NED | Steven Bergwijn | 2 | 0 | 0+1 | 0 | 0+1 | 0 | 0 | 0 |
Players away from PSV on loan:
Players who appeared for PSV no longer at the club:

=== Goal scorers ===
| Place | Position | Nation | Number | Name | Eredivisie | KNVB Cup | Europa League | Total |
|---|---|---|---|---|---|---|---|---|
| 1 | FW | (Netherlands) | 7 | Memphis Depay | 22 | 0 | 6 | 28 |
| 2 | FW | (Netherlands) | 9 | Luuk de Jong | 20 | 2 | 4 | 26 |
| 3 | MF | (Netherlands) | 10 | Georginio Wijnaldum | 14 | 2 | 2 | 18 |
| 4 | FW | (Netherlands) | 17 | Jürgen Locadia | 6 | 2 | 1 | 9 |
| 5 | MF | (Netherlands) | 6 | Adam Maher | 7 | 0 | 1 | 8 |
| 5 | FW | (Netherlands) | 11 | Luciano Narsingh | 6 | 1 | 1 | 8 |
| 7 | | | | Own goal | 4 | 1 | 0 | 5 |
| 8 | DF | (Netherlands) | 5 | Jeffrey Bruma | 3 | 0 | 0 | 3 |
| 8 | DF | (Netherlands) | 15 | Jetro Willems | 2 | 1 | 0 | 3 |
| 10 | FW | (Netherlands) | 14 | Florian Jozefzoon | 2 | 0 | 0 | 2 |
| 11 | DF | (Netherlands) | 29 | Jorrit Hendrix | 1 | 0 | 0 | 1 |
| 11 | DF | (Netherlands) | 3 | Karim Rekik | 1 | 0 | 0 | 1 |
| 11 | DF | (Colombia) | 4 | Santiago Arias | 1 | 0 | 0 | 1 |
| 11 | DF | (Netherlands) | 20 | Joshua Brenet | 1 | 0 | 0 | 1 |
| 11 | DF | (France) | 2 | Nicolas Isimat-Mirin | 1 | 0 | 0 | 1 |
| 11 | DF | (Mexico) | 18 | Andrés Guardado | 1 | 0 | 0 | 1 |
| | | | | TOTALS | 92 | 9 | 15 | 116 |

=== Disciplinary record ===
| Number | Nation | Position | Name | Eredivisie | | KNVB Cup | | Europa League | | Total | |
| Number | Nation | Position | Name | Yellow card | Red card | Yellow card | Red card | Yellow card | Red card | Yellow card | Red card |
| 2 | (France) | DF | Nicolas Isimat-Mirin | 2 | 1 | 0 | 0 | 1 | 0 | 3 | 1 |
| 3 | (Netherlands) | DF | Karim Rekik | 3 | 0 | 0 | 0 | 0 | 0 | 3 | 0 |
| 4 | (Colombia) | DF | Santiago Arias | 3 | 0 | 0 | 0 | 1 | 0 | 4 | 0 |
| 5 | (Netherlands) | DF | Jeffrey Bruma | 2 | 1 | 0 | 0 | 3 | 1 | 5 | 2 |
| 6 | (Netherlands) | MF | Adam Maher | 3 | 0 | 0 | 0 | 0 | 0 | 3 | 0 |
| 7 | (Netherlands) | FW | Memphis Depay | 2 | 0 | 0 | 0 | 2 | 0 | 4 | 0 |
| 9 | (Netherlands) | FW | Luuk de Jong | 0 | 0 | 0 | 0 | 1 | 0 | 1 | 0 |
| 10 | (Netherlands) | MF | Georginio Wijnaldum | 0 | 0 | 0 | 0 | 1 | 0 | 1 | 0 |
| 11 | (Netherlands) | FW | Luciano Narsingh | 1 | 0 | 0 | 0 | 0 | 0 | 1 | 0 |
| 14 | (Netherlands) | FW | Florian Jozefzoon | 1 | 0 | 0 | 0 | 2 | 1 | 3 | 1 |
| 15 | (Netherlands) | DF | Jetro Willems | 9 | 1 | 0 | 0 | 1 | 0 | 10 | 1 |
| 18 | (Mexico) | MF | Andrés Guardado | 3 | 0 | 1 | 0 | 2 | 0 | 6 | 0 |
| 20 | (Netherlands) | DF | Joshua Brenet | 1 | 1 | 0 | 0 | 2 | 0 | 3 | 1 |
| 27 | (Sweden) | MF | Oscar Hiljemark | 2 | 0 | 0 | 0 | 0 | 0 | 2 | 0 |
| 28 | (Netherlands) | DF | Abel Tamata | 1 | 0 | 0 | 0 | 0 | 0 | 1 | 0 |
| 29 | (Netherlands) | DF | Jorrit Hendrix | 3 | 1 | 0 | 0 | 0 | 0 | 3 | 1 |
| | | | TOTALS | 35 | 5 | 1 | 0 | 12 | 1 | 48 | 6 |

== Notes ==
- The match was abandoned at half-time due to heavy rainfall, and was resumed on 28 November 2014, 17:00, from the point of abandonment.
