= 2015 Johan Cruyff Shield =

Johan Cruijff Schaal XX
| FC Groningen | PSV Eindhoven |
| 0 | 3 |
- Date: 2 August 2015
- Venue: Amsterdam Arena, Amsterdam
- Referee: Bas Nijhuis
- Attendance: 24,000

The 2015 Johan Cruyff Shield was the twentieth edition of the Johan Cruyff Shield (Dutch: Johan Cruijff Schaal), an annual Dutch football match played between the winners of the previous season's Eredivisie and KNVB Cup. The match was contested by FC Groningen, the 2014–15 KNVB Cup winners, and PSV Eindhoven, champions of the 2014–15 Eredivisie. It was held at the Amsterdam Arena on 2 August 2015. PSV won the match 3–0.

== Match ==
2 August 2015
18:00 CET

| FC Groningen | 0–3 | PSV Eindhoven |
|---|---|---|
| | Report | De Jong 25', 63'; Maher 50' |

Amsterdam Arena, Amsterdam
Attendance: 24,000
Referee: Bas Nijhuis

| FC Groningen | PSV Eindhoven |

| GK | 1 | (Netherlands) Sergio Padt |
| RB | 33 | (Netherlands) Hans Hateboer |
| CB | 3 | (Brazil) Eric Botteghin |
| CB | 21 | (Sweden) Rasmus Lindgren (c) | (yellow card) 67' |
| LB | 28 | (Democratic Republic of the Congo) Abel Tamata |
| RM | 24 | (Netherlands) Tom Hiariej |
| CM | 10 | (Slovakia) Albert Rusnák | | (substituted off) 62' |
| LM | 22 | (Sweden) Simon Tibbling | | (substituted off) 74' |
| RW | 7 | (Netherlands) Jarchinio Antonia |
| CF | 8 | (Netherlands) Michael de Leeuw |
| LW | 11 | (Netherlands) Bryan Linssen | | (substituted off) 62' |
Substitutes:
| GK | 26 | (Netherlands) Peter van der Vlag |
| DF | 2 | (Netherlands) Johan Kappelhof |
| DF | 5 | (Netherlands) Lorenzo Burnet |
| MF | 17 | (Netherlands) Jesper Drost | | (substituted on) 62' |
| MF | 38 | (Netherlands) Juninho Bacuna | | (substituted on) 74' |
| FW | 14 | (Netherlands) Mimoun Mahi | | (substituted on) 62' |
| FW | 9 | (Netherlands) Danny Hoesen |
Manager:
(Netherlands) Erwin van de Looi

| GK | 1 | (Netherlands) Jeroen Zoet |
| RB | 4 | (Colombia) Santiago Arias |
| CB | 5 | (Netherlands) Jeffrey Bruma |
| CB | 2 | (France) Nicolas Isimat-Mirin |
| LB | 14 | (Denmark) Simon Poulsen | | (substituted off) 69' |
| DM | 29 | (Netherlands) Jorrit Hendrix |
| CM | 6 | (Netherlands) Davy Pröpper |
| CM | 10 | (Netherlands) Adam Maher | | (substituted off) 85' |
| RW | 11 | (Netherlands) Luciano Narsingh |
| CF | 9 | (Netherlands) Luuk de Jong (c) |
| LW | 19 | (Netherlands) Jürgen Locadia | | (substituted off) 74' |
Substitutes:
| GK | 22 | (Netherlands) Remko Pasveer |
| DF | 20 | (Netherlands) Joshua Brenet | | (substituted on) 69' |
| DF | 33 | (Netherlands) Suently Alberto |
| MF | 8 | (Netherlands) Stijn Schaars |
| MF | 18 | (Mexico) Andrés Guardado | (yellow card) 90' | (substituted on) 74' |
| FW | 7 | (Uruguay) Gastón Pereiro | | (substituted on) 85' |
| FW | 16 | (Belgium) Maxime Lestienne |
Manager:
(Netherlands) Phillip Cocu

Match officials:

- Assistant referees:
  - Rob van de Ven
  - Charl Schaap
- Fourth official: Angelo Boonman
