= Simon Poulsen =

Danish footballer (born 1984)

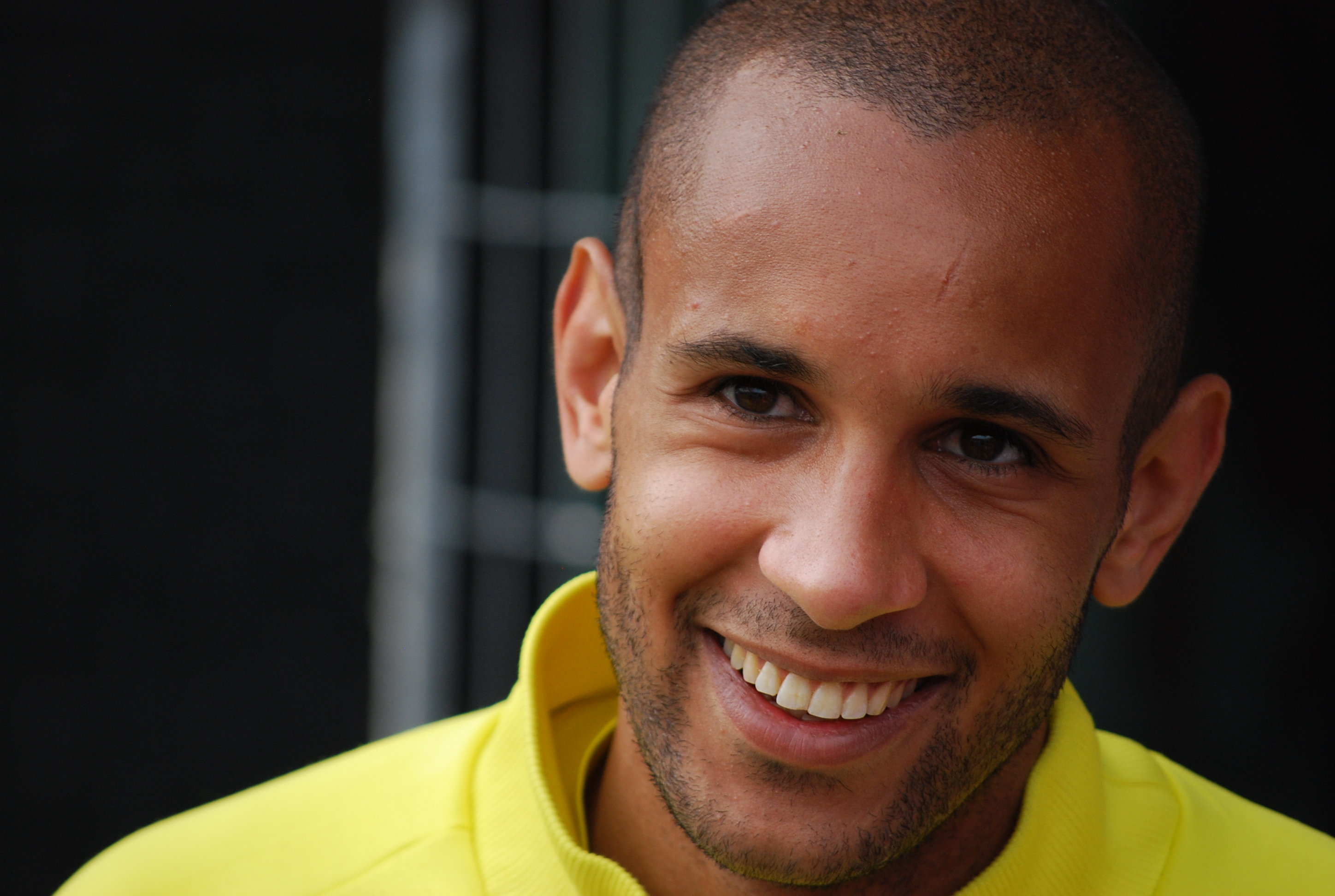
- Poulsen in 2011

Personal information
- Full name: Simon Busk Poulsen
- Date of birth: 7 October 1984 (age 42)
- Place of birth: Sønderborg, Denmark
- Height: 1.84 m (6 ft 0 in)
- Position: Left-back

Team information
- Current team: SønderjyskE (assistant)

Youth career
- Ulkebøl

Senior career*
Years	Team	Apps	(Gls)
2002–2005	SønderjyskE	71	(23)
2005–2007	Midtjylland	63	(5)
2008–2012	AZ	93	(6)
2012–2014	Sampdoria	7	(0)
2014–2015	AZ	42	(3)
2015–2017	PSV	2	(0)
2017–2018	SønderjyskE	45	(1)
Total		323	(40)

International career
2002–2003	Denmark U19	7	(0)
2003–2004	Denmark U20	7	(0)
2005–2006	Denmark U21	11	(1)
2007–2015	Denmark	31	(0)

Managerial career
- 2019–: SønderjyskE (assistant)
- * Club domestic league appearances and goals

Simon Busk Poulsen (born 7 October 1984) is a Danish former professional footballer who played as a left-back.

He has played 31 games for the Denmark national team. Following his retirement from professional football, Poulsen moved to coaching and is currently the assistant coach of SønderjyskE.

== Club career ==
=== SønderjyskE ===
Born and raised in Sønderborg, Denmark, Poulsen began his football career at early age and started out at Ulkebøl and SUB Sønderborg. He then joined Haderslev Fodboldklub before the name was changed to HFK Sønderjylland and SønderjyskE and signed his first professional contract with the club, keeping him until 2003. Poulsen was also named the club's junior player of the year. While progressing at HFK Sønderjylland, he balanced his life in football and school and was banned from drinking alcohol. In 2001, Poulsen was quickly promoted to the club's first team and scored on his debut, in a 4–2 win against FC Aarhus in the third round of the Danish Cup. After the match, he reflected about scoring his debut, saying: "It was one of the best days of my life back then. I scored on my first ball touch, and actually became the youngest goal scorer in the Danish cup tournament." Poulsen then started out on the substitute bench. Once again, he was promoted to HFK Sønderjylland's first team ahead of the 2002–03 season.

Poulsen then received a handful of first team football since the start of the 2002–03 season. On 30 September 2002, he scored his first goal for HFK Sønderjylland, in a 3–2 loss against B1909. Poulsen later scored three more goals for the club, as he went on to make fifteen appearances and scoring four times at the end of the 2002–03 season. For his performance, Poulsen signed a contract extension with HFK Sønderjylland, keeping him until 2006.

The next two seasons saw Poulsen continued to regain his first team place for SønderjyskE, which has changed its name ahead of the new season. He started the season well by scoring his first goal of the season, in a 2–1 win against Vejle on 31 July 2003. His performance attracted interest from Bundesliga side Werder Bremen, who offered him a trial, but Poulsen ended up staying at the club. His goal scoring eventually improved for the next two seasons, scoring the total of eighteen times. His two goals for the club beating Fredericia 4–1 saw SønderjyskE promoted to the Danish Superliga. Despite being plagued with injuries during the two seasons, Poulsen combined the appearances of fifty–one played and scoring eighteen six times in all competitions.

Amid to his departure, Poulsen made five times for SønderjyskE at the start of the 2005–06 season, including scoring his first Danish Superliga goal, in a 3–1 loss against Viborg on 7 August 2005. After his departure from the club, he was honoured with Wall of Fame at Sydbank Park.

=== FC Midtjylland ===
It was announced on 24 June 2005 that Poulsen agreed to move to league rivals Midtjylland on a three–year contract. However, SønderjyskE complained about the tapping-up of Poulsen to the Danish Football Association, which delayed the move. Eventually, the move was agreed officially on 15 August 2005, with Thomas Rathe joining SønderjyskE as his replacement.

Poulsen made his debut for the club against AGF on 21 August 2005, starting the whole game, and scored his first goal, in a 3–3 draw. Since making his debut for FC Midtjylland, he quickly established himself in the starting eleven for the side. Poulsen then played in both legs in the first round of the UEFA Cup, as FC Midtjylland lost 6–2 against CSKA Moscow on aggregate and was eliminated from the tournament. However, he suffered a knee injury while on international duty and was sidelined for a month. On 4 May 2006, Poulsen returned to the first team, starting a match and played 77 minutes before being substituted, in a 1–0 win against Odense BK. At the end of the 2005–06 Superliga season, he went on to make seventeen appearances and scoring once in all competitions.

At the start of the 2006–07 season, Poulsen continued to establish himself in the starting eleven for FC Midtjylland, playing in the midfield position. On 20 August 2006, he scored his first goal of the season, in a 4–2 loss against Esbjerg fB. Poulsen later helped the club finish second place in the league. Despite being sidelined with injuries throughout the 2006–07 season, he went on to make twenty–eight appearances and scoring once in all competitions.

At the start of the 2007–08 season, Poulsen continued to establish himself in the starting eleven for FC Midtjylland, playing in the midfield position. On 29 July 2007, he scored his first goal of the season, in a 5–0 win against Brøndby. This was followed up by scoring second goal of the season, in a 2–1 win against Keflavík in the second leg of the UEFA Cup First Round to help the club reach the next round following FC Midtjylland win on away goals, with the results was 4–4 on aggregate. Three weeks later on 26 August 2007, Poulsen scored his third goal of the season, in a 3–2 win against Randers. On 10 September 2007, he signed a contract extension with the club, keeping him until 2011. His fourth goal of the season came on 30 September 2007, in a 2–0 win against AGF. Poulsen's performances as left winger resulted in him being named for the 2007 Danish Team of the Year. He was also nominated for the 2007 Danish Player of the Year but lost out to Daniel Agger. In the first half of the 2007–08 season, Poulsen went on to make thirty appearances and scoring four times in all competitions.

Despite signing a contract with FC Midtjylland, his performance attracted interests from European clubs, with the likes from Germany and Netherlands, and was expected to leave the club.

=== AZ Alkmaar ===
On 23 December 2007, Poulsen transferred to Dutch side AZ Alkmaar for a reported transfer fee of €3 million, as the most expensive player sold by FC Midtjylland at the time.

He made his debut for the club, coming on as a 74th-minute substitute, in a 6–1 loss against Ajax on 13 January 2008. Six days later on 19 January 2008, Poulsen made his first start for AZ Alkmaar, starting a match and played 65 minutes before being substituted, in a 4–0 loss against SC Heerenveen. However, he suffered a hamstring injury that kept him out for two matches. On 30 January 2008, Poulsen returned from injury, coming on as an 80th-minute substitute, in a 2–2 draw against Feyenoord. Once again, he was plagued with injuries that saw him sidelined for the rest of the 2007–08 season. At the end of the 2007–08 season, Poulsen made eight appearances in all competitions.

At the start of the 2008–09 season, Poulsen could not break into coach Louis van Gaal's starting line-up as a winger, and was placed on the substitute bench. As a result, he was demoted to Jong AZ Alkmaar and featured in a match regularly. On 31 August 2008, he made his first appearance of the season for AZ Alkmaar, starting a match and played 60 minutes before being substituted, in a 2–1 loss against NAC Breda. Poulsen made a total of two more appearances for the club between August and January. By February, he began moving to the position of left-back, appearing in a number of matches for AZ Alkmaar. Between 21 February 2009 and 15 March 2009, Poulsen helped the club keep four consecutive clean sheets for the club. He played a number of games in the position, as AZ won the 2008–09 Eredivisie championship, the first club championship since 1981. At the end of the 2008–09 season, Poulsen went on to make thirteen appearances in all competitions.

Ahead of the 2009–10 season, it was expected that Poulsen would leave AZ Alkmaar, due to lack of first team opportunities, but ended up staying at the club. After not being featured in the first two matches of the 2009–10 season, he made his first appearance of the season, coming on as a 42nd-minute substitute, in a 6–0 win against RKC Waalwijk on 15 August 2009. After the match, Poulsen said he was happy to get minutes of playing time. Poulsen continued to compete with Sébastien Pocognoli over the left–back position, which saw him rotated in and out of the starting eleven. However, in a match against FC Utrecht on 26 September 2009, he was sent–off for a second bookable offence, in a 1–0 loss. Three days later on 29 September 2009, Poulsen made his UEFA Champions League debut, coming on as a 71st-minute substitute, in a 1–1 draw against Standard Liège. He then made his first UEFA Champions League start and started the whole game, as AZ Alkmaar drew 1–1 against Arsenal on 20 October 2009. Following Pocognoli's departure, Poulsen, once again, established himself in the starting eleven, playing in the left–back position. On 20 February 2010, he scored his first goal for the club, in a 3–3 draw against VVV-Venlo. Between 3 April 2010 and 18 April 2010, Poulsen, once again, helped AZ Alkmaar keep four consecutive clean sheets. At the end of the 2009–10 season, Poulsen went on to make thirty appearances and scoring once in all competitions.

At the start of the 2010–11 season, Poulsen made his first appearance of the season, starting the whole game, in a 1–1 draw against NAC Breda in the opening game of the season. However, he suffered a groin injury while on international duty, with Manager Gertjan Verbeek was disappointed, saying: "It is ridiculous to call up internationals so soon after the World Cup. Most people who know about that do not think that is smart. However, the national associations do not care." As a result, Poulsen was sidelined for a month following a scan. But he made his return to the starting line–up in a UEFA Europa League match against Sheriff Tiraspol on 16 September 2010, coming on as a second-half substitute, in a 2–1 win. However, Poulsen's return was short–lived when he twisted his knee injury while training and was sidelined for the next two months. By November, Poulsen made a recovery from his knee injury but did not due to not being match fit for the remainder of the month. On 12 December 2010, he returned to the first team, coming on as an 84th-minute substitute, in a 2–0 loss against FC Groningen. Following this, Poulsen continued to rotate in and out of the starting line–up, as he competed with Ragnar Klavan over the left–back position for the rest of the 2010–11 season. On 18 March 2011, Poulsen scored his first goal of the season, as well as, setting up one of AZ's goals, in a 3–1 win against Vitesse. He later helped the club finish fourth place to qualify for the UEFA Europa League next season. At the end of the 2010–11 season, he went on to make sixteen appearances and scoring once in all competitions.

In the 2011–12 season, Poulsen regained his first team place in the starting eleven, playing in the left–back position. He started the season well for AZ Alkmaar by helping the club qualify for the Group Stage of the UEFA Europa League after beating the likes of Jablonec and Aalesunds. Poulsen then helped AZ Alkmaar keep three consecutive clean sheets in three league matches between 21 August 2011 and 10 September 2011. On 2 October 2011, he scored his first goal for the club, in a 3–1 win against VVV-Venlo. Between 23 October 2011 and 25 November 2011, Poulsen, once again, helped AZ Alkmaar keep four consecutive clean sheets in four league matches. Two weeks later on 10 December 2011, he scored his second goal of the season, in a 4–0 win against De Graafschap. Five days later on 15 December 2011, Poulsen helped the club qualify for the knockout stage of the UEFA Europa League after drawing 1–1 against Metalist Kharkiv. After helping AZ Alkmaar beat Ajax 3–2 in the fourth round of KNVB Cup, he scored an own goal to give the opposition team an equalising goal, resulting a 1–1 draw three days later on 22 January 2012. Between 8 February 2012 and 16 February 2012, Poulsen helped the club keep three consecutive clean sheets in three matches. On 3 March 2012, he scored his third goal of the season, in a 3–1 win against Heracles Almelo. This was followed by helping the club keep three consecutive clean sheets in the next three league matches before scoring his fourth league of the season, in a 2–2 draw against Vitesse. Despite suffering injuries during the 2011–12 season, Poulsen went on to make fifty–four appearances and scoring four times in all competitions.

With his contract expiring at the end of the 2011–12 season, Poulsen's future at the club was in doubt and could be leaving after AZ Alkmaar has not begun negotiations over a new contract. As a result, he was linked with a move to clubs, such as, Premier League side Aston Villa, La Liga side Deportivo de La Coruña, Ligue 1 side Lyon and Serie A side Juventus and Napoli. The club, on the other hand, were not determined to let Poulsen go and wanted him to stay until next summer, as well as, possibilities of new contract. It was later confirmed on 30 November 2011 that both Brett Holman and Poulsen will leave AZ Alkmaar until the end of the 2011–12 season.

=== Sampdoria ===
On 25 August 2012, Poulsen joined the Italian Serie A side Sampdoria on a three-year contract. He was previously linked with a move to Ajax, who offered him a two–year contract, but rejected the offer.

Poulsen made his debut for the club, coming on as an 87th-minute substitute, in a 1–0 loss against Napoli on 30 September 2012. In a follow–up match against Chievo, he made his first start for Sampdoria, playing 66 minutes before being substituted, in a 2–1 loss. Since joining the club, however, Poulsen found his first team opportunities limited at Sampdoria, due to strong competitions in the defence. He also faced his own injury concerns throughout the 2012–13 season. In his first season at the club, Poulsen made eight appearances in all competitions.

Ahead of the 2013–14 season, Poulsen was linked a move away from Sampdoria, with several clubs from Europe wanted to sign him, but he ended up staying at the club. His only appearance for Sampdoria came on 5 December 2013 against Hellas Verona in the fourth round of the Italian Cup, as the club won 4–1. It was announced on 16 January 2014 that Poulsen left Sampdoria by mutual consent.

=== AZ Alkmaar ===
On the same day when his contract with Sampdoria had been dissolved on 16 January 2014, Poulsen rejoined his former team AZ Alkmaar, keeping him until 2015. Upon joining the club, he was given a number fifteen shirt.

Poulsen made his AZ Alkmaar debut on 8 February 2014, coming on as a 73rd-minute substitute, in a 2–1 loss against Go Ahead Eagles. He soon regained his first team place for the rest of the 2013–14 season. Poulsen then kept four of the five clean sheets in the club's matches between 2 March 2014 and 20 March 2014, especially against Anzhi Makhachkala. This was followed by making his 100th league appearance for AZ Alkmaar, in a 2–1 win against PEC Zwolle. He was featured in the league's play–offs for the UEFA Europa League spot, as the club were unsuccessful to qualify after losing 3–0 against FC Groningen. Despite suffering a groin injury later in the 2013–14 season, Poulsen went on to make eighteen appearances in all competitions.

At the start of the 2014–15 season, Poulsen continued to establish himself in the first team, playing in the left–back position. On 27 September 2014, he scored his first goal of the season, in a 3–2 win against ADO Den Haag. Between 8 November 2014 and 29 November 2014, Poulsen kept three consecutive clean sheets in three league matches for AZ Alkmaar. During a match against Cambuur on 29 November 2014, he suffered a calf injury and was substituted at half time; resulting in him missing one match. But Poulsen returned to the starting line–up against Feyenoord on 14 December 2014 and helped the club draw 2–2. A month later on 17 January 2015, he scored his second goal of the season, in a 2–0 win against Dordrecht. After the match, Poulsen was named Man of the Match. However, he suffered a leg injury that saw him miss one match. Poulsen returned to the starting line–up against Ajax and set up the only goal of the game to help AZ Alkmaar win 1–0 on 5 February 2015. Two weeks later on 21 February 2015, he scored his third goal of the season, in a 2–0 win against Go Ahead Eagles. At the end of the 2014–15 season, Poulsen went on to make thirty–five appearances and scoring three times in all competitions.

=== PSV Eindhoven ===
On 15 May 2015, Poulsen signed for PSV on a free transfer, signing a two–year contract. AZ Alkmaar offered him a contract to stay at the club, ended up joining PSV Eindhoven instead. Upon joining the club, he was given a number fourteen shirt.

Poulsen made his debut for PSV Eindhoven where he started throughout the match and kept a clean sheet, in a 3–0 win over FC Groningen to win the Johan Cruijff Schaal. A month later on 19 September 2015, Poulsen made his league debut for the club, coming on as an 80th-minute substitute, in a 2–1 loss against Heracles Almelo. He then played three more times, including two UEFA Champions League matches against CSKA Moscow and Wolfsburg. However, throughout the 2015–16 season, Poulsen found himself placed on the substitute bench, as he was as cover for incumbent PSV left-back Jetro Willems. Poulsen also faced his own injury concerns along the way. At the end of the 2015–16 season, he went on to make five appearances in all competitions. Poulsen was further demoted to Jong PSV, playing nine times for the second team.

In the 2016–17 season, Poulsen's first team opportunities at PSV Eindhoven continued to be limited, covering for Willems and made no appearances for the club. As a result, he wanted to leave PSV Eindhoven to get first team football.

=== SønderjyskE (second spell) ===
On 31 January 2017, Poulsen returned to former club SønderjyskE, signing a two-and-a-half-year contract. PSV Eindhoven mentioned that they "receives a small transfer fee". Upon joining the club for the second time, he said his return was to end his career there.

Poulsen re–debuted for SønderjyskE, starting the whole game in the left–back position, in a 3–0 loss against Esbjerg fB on 17 February 2017. Since joining the club, he started in the next six matches for SønderjyskE, starting in the left–back position to help the side qualify for the league's Championship Round. After being placed on the substitute bench for two matches, Poulsen returned to the starting line–up against Brøndby on 30 April 2017 and played 65 minutes before being substituted, in a 1–1 draw. After missing the next three matches due to quarantine, he returned to the starting line–up against Brøndby on 21 May 2017 and helped the club keep a clean sheet, in a 3–0 win. At the end of the 2016–17 season, Poulsen went on to make ten appearances in all competitions.

Ahead of the 2017–18 season, it was announced Poulsen was appointed as SønderjyskE's vice captain, with Marc Pedersen appointed as the main captain. He started in the next four league matches before suffering a calf injury that saw him miss one match. But Poulsen returned to the starting line–up against Copenhagen on 19 August 2017, as the club lost 3–2. In the absence of Pedersen, he captained SønderjyskE for the first time against AC Horsens on 16 September 2017 and scored his first goal since returning to the club for the first time in twelve years, in a 2–2 draw. This was followed up by captaining SønderjyskE in the next two matches. However, he suffered an injury while training that saw him miss two matches. On 29 October 2017, Poulsen returned to the first team, coming on as a 59th-minute substitute, in a 1–1 draw against Hobro. After appearing two more times, his return was short–lived when he suffered another injury that kept him out for months. By February, Poulsen made a quick recovery and returned to the starting line–up against Helsingør on 4 March 2018 and set up the club's second goal of the game, which turns out to be a winning goal, in a 2–0 win. Two weeks later on 18 March 2018, he, once again, captained SønderjyskE in the absence of Pedersen, as the club lost 2–1. In the league's relegation round, Poulsen appeared twice, as the club qualify for the league's European play–offs. However, SønderjyskE were unsuccessful to qualify for the UEFA Europa League next season after losing 4–2 on aggregate against AGF. At the end of the 2017–18 season, he went on to make nineteen appearances and scoring once in all competitions.

After missing the first four league matches due to being on the substitute bench, Poulsen made his first appearance for SønderjyskE of the 2018–19 season, coming on as a second-half substitute, in a 1–0 loss against Esbjerg fB on 13 August 2018. Two weeks later on 26 August 2018, he set up the club's first goal of the game, in a 3–2 loss against Copenhagen. In a follow–up match, Poulsen captained SønderjyskE for the first time this season in the absence of Pedersen and helped the club draw 1–1 against Hobro. In another follow–up match, he set up two goals for SønderjyskE, as the club won 4–2 against Brøndby. Following this, Poulsen continued to establish himself in the left–back position for the rest of the first of the season. By the time he announced his retirement from professional football, Poulsen made sixteen appearances in all competitions.

== Post-playing career ==
On 4 January 2019, Poulsen announced his retirement from professional football, but would continue at the club, becoming the new assistant coach of the first team and a youth coach. It was announced on 27 November 2018 that he signed a contract extension with SønderjyskE, keeping him until 2023.

== International career ==
Poulsen is eligible to play for Denmark, Nigeria (through his mother) and United States (through his father), but opted to play for Denmark.

=== Youth team ===
Having represented Denmark under-19 national team and Denmark U20 (making a total of 25 games and score one goal for various Danish youth selections), Poulsen was selected for the Denmark under-21 national team squad for the first time in April 2004. On 16 August 2005, he made his U21 debut, in a 1–0 loss against England U21. In May 2006, Poulsen was selected for the Denmark U21 squad for the 2006 European Under-21 Championship. However, he appeared once in the tournament, as the U21 side were eliminated in the group stage. Three months later on 16 August 2006, Poulsen scored his first Denmark U21 goal, in a 3–2 loss against the Switzerland under-21 national team. In all, he played 11 games and scored one goal for the Danish under-21 national team.

Poulsen was called up for the Denmark League XI national football team, and played unofficial national team games against the United States, El Salvador and Honduras in January 2007.

=== Senior team ===
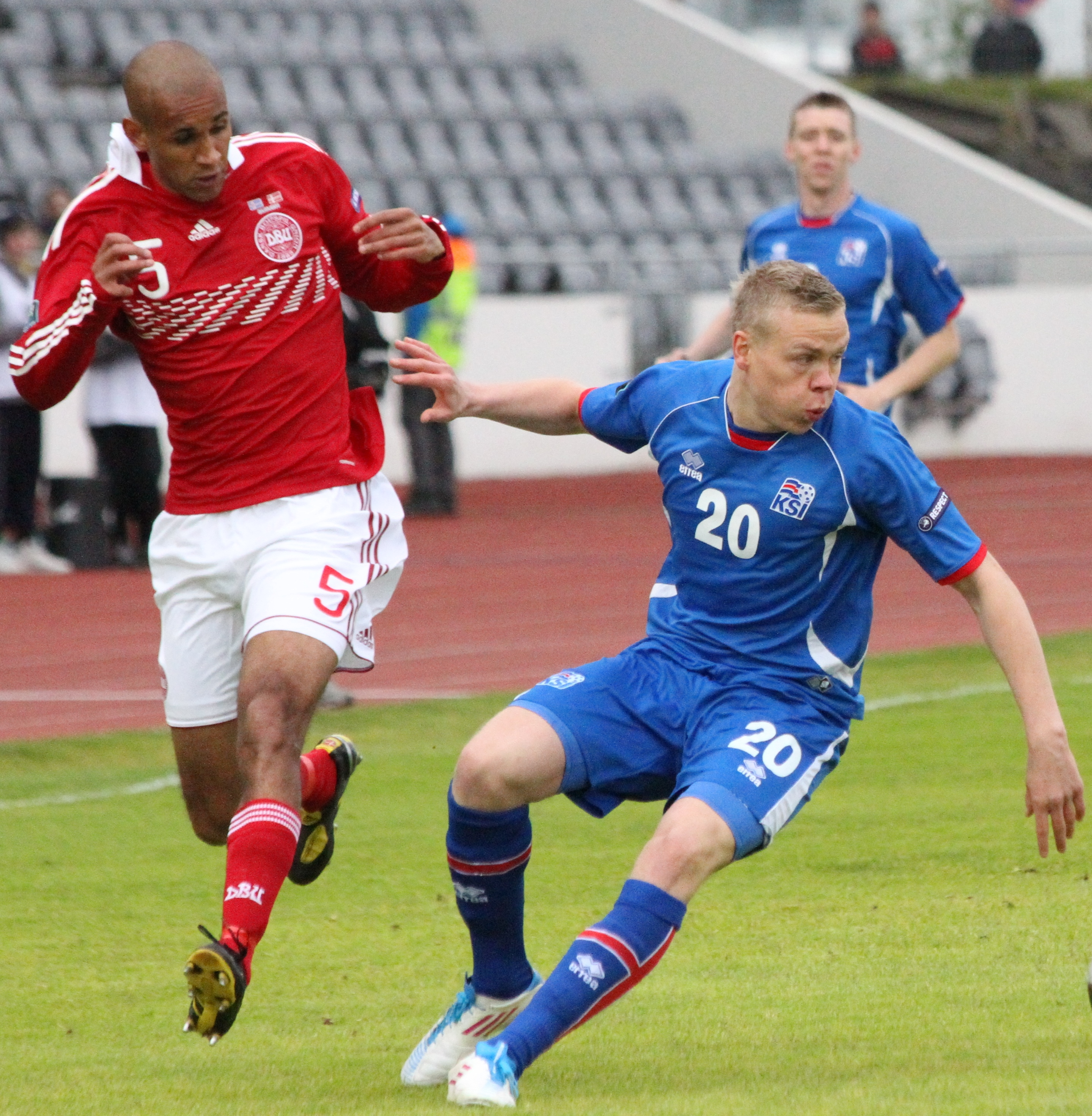
Poulsen attempted to chase a ball from Kolbeinn Sigþórsson during a match between Denmark and Iceland on 4 June 2011.

Poulsen was called up for the Denmark national team in March 2007, by national team manager Morten Olsen. Initially not getting playing time against Spain, he made his national team debut in a friendly match against Germany on 28 March 2007, coming on as a substitute for Dennis Rommedahl, in a 1–0 win. Poulsen took part in two UEFA Euro 2008 qualification in November 2007, coming against Northern Ireland and Iceland.

Following this, his international career went on a hiatus and on 10 May 2010, Poulsen was recalled to the team, ahead of the 2010 FIFA World Cup, as Olsen thought he had improved in the back position. For the first time in almost three years, Poulsen made his first appearances for Denmark in the friendly match against Senegal on 27 May 2010, starting a match and played 45 minutes before being substituted at half time, in a 2–0 win. Shortly after, he was included in Olsen's final World Cup squad. On 14 June in their first 2010 FIFA World Cup group match against the Netherlands, Poulsen had a crucial part in Daniel Agger's own goal by heading the ball against his back inside the first minute of the second half which deflected past the Danish goalkeeper, thus giving the Dutch the lead, and the national side went on to lose 2–0. He started two more matches against Cameroon and Japan, as Denmark were eliminated in the group stage.

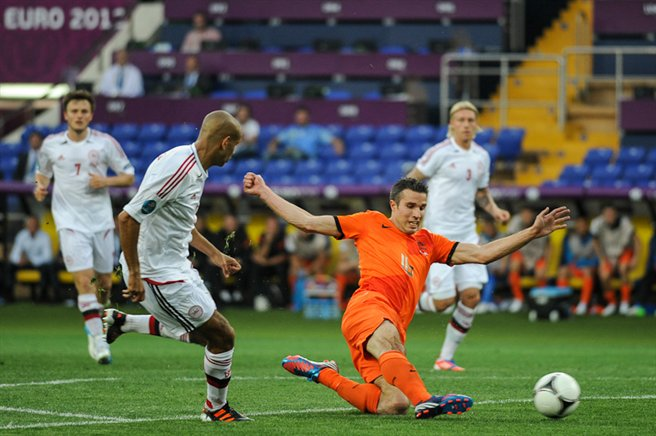
Poulsen looks on as Robin van Persie attempts a shot during a match between Denmark and the Netherlands at UEFA Euro 2012.

Following the World Cup tournament, Poulsen was called up to the national team two months later and started against Germany on 11 August 2010, only to suffer an injury and was substituted in the 28th minute, as the national team drew 2–2. On 1 February 2011, he was called up to the national team once again. Poulsen was featured against England on 9 February 2011 and was at fault for conceding an equalising, leading him to be substituted at half time, as Denmark lost 2–1. Despite this, he was later featured three more matches in the UEFA Euro 2012 qualifying, helping Denmark qualify for the UEFA Euro 2012 after coming on as a 76th-minute substitute to help the national side beat 2–1 Portugal on 11 October 2011. In May 2012, Poulsen was inducted in the final squad for Euro 2012. He started in the tournament against Netherlands on 9 June 2012 and set up a goal for Michael Krohn-Dehli, who scored the only goal of the game to help Denmark win 1–0. After the match, Ekstrabladet said about his performance, saying: "If you can talk about revenge from the World Cup two years ago, he got it. He's only grown a few levels. Tactically and playfully, it's great to see how unimpressed he goes to work. The robe was most often shut down. In the first half he was the Dane with the most passes." He then featured two more matches in the tournament for the national team, playing in the left–back position against Portugal and Germany, as they were eliminated in the group stage.

Following the end of the UEFA Euro 2012 tournament, Poulsen didn't get a call–up from Denmark until on 12 March 2013. He made his first appearance in nine months against Czech Republic on 22 March 2013 and started the whole game to help the national team keep a clean sheet, in a 3–0 win. After the match, Ekstrabladet said about his performance: "Hesitant and insecure in most interventions. Seemed clearly rusty and the lack of combat training could be seen in both the interventions and the duels." This led Manager Olsen to defend his performance, saying: "Simon played a really good match as a team player. Everyone makes small mistakes. So do those who played a great match, but those mistakes are sometimes not noticed. I think that many have a wrong approach to Simon Poulsen. Every time he has made just a small mistake, he has played a bad match." Poulsen went on to make three more appearances by the end of the year, two of which were qualifying matches, as Denmark failed to qualify for the FIFA World Cup.

On 30 September 2014, he was called up to the national team for the first time in a year. Poulsen made his first appearance in a year, coming on as a 58th-minute substitute, in a 1–0 loss against Portugal on 14 October 2014. He then followed up by making five more appearances in the next five matches. He then spent the rest of 2015 for Denmark's matches on the substitute bench, including the UEFA Euro 2016 qualifying play-offs against Sweden, as the national team failed to qualify for the UEFA Euro 2016 following a 4–3 defeat on aggregate. Following this, Poulsen was never called up to the Denmark squad again and made thirty–one appearances for the national team.

== Personal life ==
As a result of joining Haderslev Fodboldklub, Poulsen and his family relocated to Haderslev, as his mother, Bibbi Poulsen, was supportive of his son becoming a professional footballer. He is married to his wife, Mette, and together, they have a daughter. The combination of his daughter being born and scoring against Go Ahead Eagles on 21 February 2015 led Poulsen to describe the week as "fantastic".

In November 2005, while on international duty with Denmark U21, Poulsen was under investigation by Anti Doping Denmark, DBU or UEFA for alleged doping. After a month of investigation, he was cleared by the DIF's doping committee.

In October 2007, Poulsen was subjected to death threats on his mobile phone after receiving a phone call from an unknown individuals. This was quickly resolved when a Viborg's supporter was caught and was banned from entering the Viborg Stadium for three years. Poulsen revealed earlier this year when he was subjected to racial abuse from the opposition team supporters.

== Honours ==
SønderjyskE

- Danish 1st Division: 2004–05

AZ

- Eredivisie: 2008–09

PSV

- Johan Cruyff Shield: 2015
- Eredivisie: 2015–16
