= Jeroen Zoet =

Dutch footballer (born 1991)

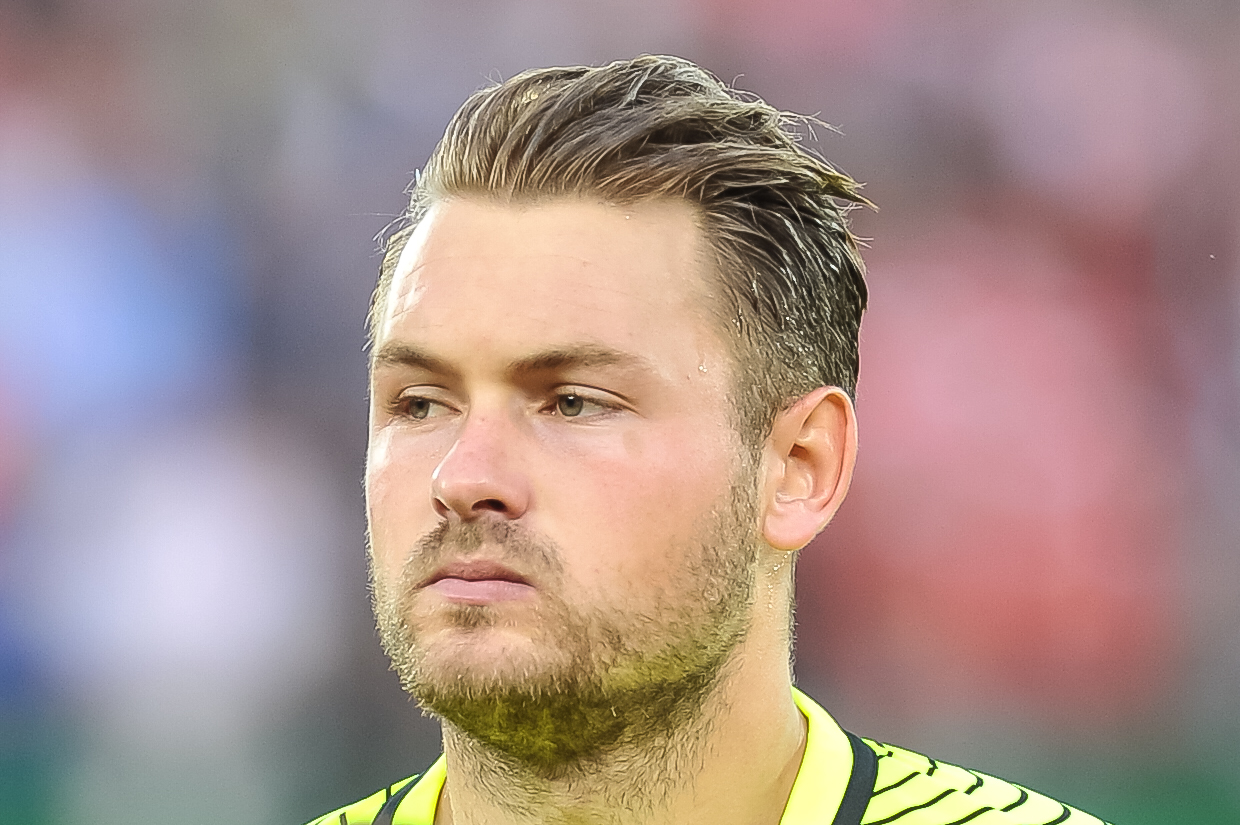
- Zoet with the Netherlands in 2016

Personal information
- Date of birth: 6 January 1991 (age 35)
- Place of birth: Veendam, Netherlands
- Height: 1.89 m (6 ft 2 in)
- Position: Goalkeeper

Team information
- Current team: AZ
- Number: 41

Youth career
- VV Veendam 1894
- –2006: BV Veendam
- 2006–2011: PSV

Senior career*
Years	Team	Apps	(Gls)
2011–2020	PSV	203	(0)
2011–2013	→ RKC Waalwijk (loan)	67	(0)
2020	→ Utrecht (loan)	7	(0)
2020–2024	Spezia	44	(0)
2024–	AZ	18	(0)

International career^{‡}
2006–2008	Netherlands U17	13	(0)
2008–2010	Netherlands U19	12	(0)
2010–2013	Netherlands U21	21	(0)
2013–2018	Netherlands	11	(0)
- * Club domestic league appearances and goals as of 4 April 2026 ‡ National team caps and goals as of 31 May 2018

Jeroen Zoet (Dutch pronunciation: [jəˈrun ˈzut]; born 6 January 1991) is a Dutch professional footballer who plays as a goalkeeper for Eredivisie club AZ Alkmaar.

Having started his career at PSV Eindhoven, Zoet previously played two seasons on loan for RKC Waalwijk before returning to PSV Eindhoven to establish himself as the first choice goalkeeper. He has been highly regarded as one of the best goalkeepers in the Eredivisie. In November 2012, he was called up for the first time for the Netherlands national squad, but he did not make his first appearance until October 2015, when he was subbed on for an injured Tim Krul.

== Club career ==
=== PSV Eindhoven ===
Zoet played for his home town club BV Veendam's youth academy until 2006. He started his career at PSV at the age of 15, slowly making his way through up the ranks and into the senior squad. On 5 December 2008, he signed his first professional contract with the club, keeping him until 2012. He earned his first call up to the senior side during the 2008–09 season, making the substitutes bench in the game against AZ.

Ahead of the 2009–10 season, Zoet was given a number 41 shirt for the first team. He has been involved and travelled to the first team squad unused throughout the season before sidelined with a knee injury. However, in the 2010–11 season, Zoet, again, suffered a knee injury that kept him out of the first team for a long time. Although he returned from injury in January, he remained out of the first team for the side. At the end of the 2010–11 season, Zoet signed a contract extension with the club, keeping him until 2014.

=== RKC Waalwijk (loan) ===
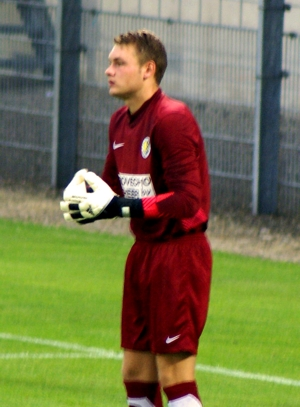
Zoet making his debut for RKC Waalwijk against Heracles Almelo, in an eventual 2–2 draw on 6 August 2011

Ahead of the 2011–12 season, the club's Director of Football Marcel Brands announced that Zoet was to be loaned out to get first team football. It was announced on 27 June 2011 that Zoet joined RKC Waalwijk on loan for the rest of the 2011–12 season, beating out several teams, who were interested in signing him.

Zoet made his league debut, as well as, his debut at RKC Waalwijk, against Heracles Almelo in an eventual 2–2 draw on 6 August 2011. In a follow–up match, he played against his parent club, PSV Eindhoven, for the whole game and conceded the only goal in the game, in a 1–0 loss. Since joining the club, he established himself in the starting eleven, as a first choice goalkeeper. His performance at RKC Waalwijk attracted interests from other clubs around Europe. Then, on 20 December 2011 in the KNVB Beker Round of 16 against Go Ahead Eagles, Zoet set up the club's first goal of the game and helped the club win 3–2 to progress to the next round. However, he was soon at fault when he conceded five goals in a 5–0 loss against FC Twente on 21 January 2012. He was able to make amends when he kept the next two matches with clean sheets. Zoet then played against his parent club, PSV Eindhoven, for the second time this season on 12 April 2012 and helped them beat them 2–1, in hopes of qualifying for the UEFA Europa League next season. In the league's play-offs for a spot in the UEFA Europa League, he started all four matches, as RKC Waalwijk lost 5–2 to Vitesse on aggregate. At the end of the 2011–12 season, Zoet went on to make forty–two appearances in all competitions, including starting all the matches in the league.

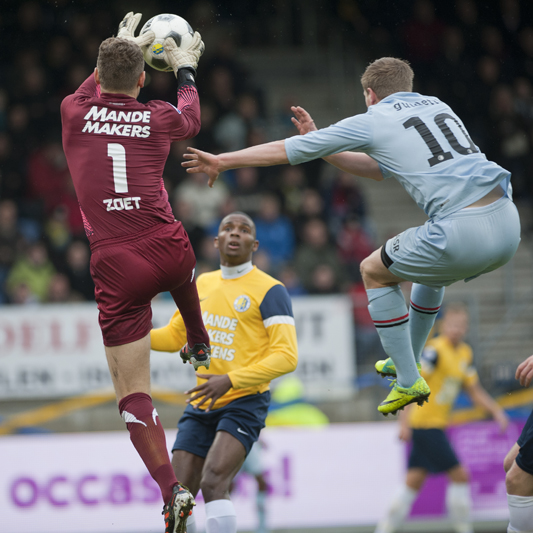
Zoet about to grab a ball against Feyenoord's John Guidetti

Despite being keen on returning to his parent club next season, Zoet, again, was loaned out to RKC Waalwijk for the 2012–13 season. In the opening game of the season, Zoet started the match against his parent club, PSV Eindhoven, and helped the side beat them 3–2. Following a 1–0 win over Roda JC, Manager Erwin Koeman praised his performances over his saves. Between 10 November 2012 and 17 November 2012, Zoet kept two clean sheets in two matches, both of them were wins against Heerenveen and FC Utrecht. Zoet started in every match since the start of the 2012–13 season until he was sent–off in the 83rd minute for a professional foul, in a 1–0 loss against SC Heerenveen on 1 February 2013. For his sending off, he served a one match ban. At the end of the 2012–13 season, Zoet went on to make thirty–five appearances in all competitions, having played thirty–three times in the league by being a first choice goalkeeper for RKC Waalwijk once again.

=== Return to PSV Eindhoven ===
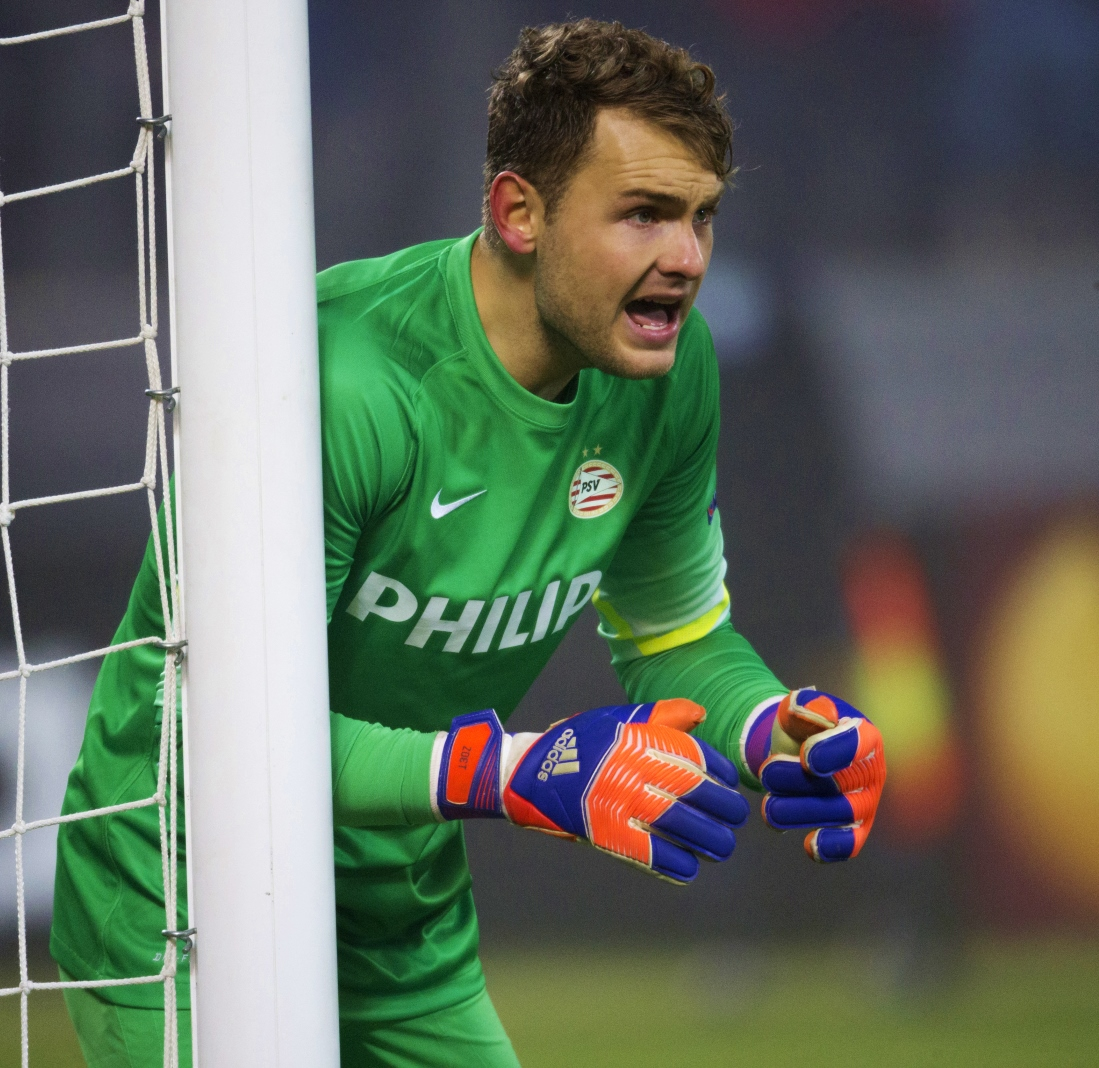
Zoet during the Europa League game against FC Zenit on 26 February 2015

Zoet returned to his parent club PSV at the start of the 2013–14 season following his successful loan spells at RKC Waalwijk. Ahead of the 2013–14 season, he was expected to compete with Przemysław Tytoń over the first choice goalkeeper by Manager Phillip Cocu. It was announced by Cocu that Zoet was named as the club's first choice goalkeeper this season. Prior to this, he attracted the interest of Premier League clubs such as Arsenal and Newcastle, even having the transfer move almost completed, which was never materialised.

Zoet made his PSV Eindhoven debut, starting as the club's first choice goalkeeper, against Zulte Waregem in the third round qualifying round of the UEFA Champions League, in a 2–0 win. He then made his league debut for PSV Eindhoven in the opening game of the season against ADO Den Haag, where they won 3–2. Zoet then kept three more clean sheets in the next three matches, including helping the side beat Zulte Waregem 3–0 in the return leg to progress to the play–off round. For his performance, he signed a contract extension with the club, keeping him until 2017. However, PSV Eindhoven were eliminated in the play–offs round after losing 4–1 on aggregate to A.C. Milan. He started in every match for the side until he suffered a groin injury during a 2–1 loss against AZ Alkmaar. After the match, it was announced that he would be out for almost two months. It wasn't until on 23 November 2013 when Zoet returned to the starting lineup, in a 1–1 draw against SC Heerenveen. In the next two matches against Vitesse and Chornomorets Odesa, Zoet suffered a bad luck, conceding the total of seven goals, that saw the club lost two times, and were eliminated in the UEFA Europa League Group Stage. But he was able to redeem himself when he helped the club win two matches by the end of the year, including saving a penalty. He continued to regain his form as a first choice goalkeeper in a number of matches, which saw his performance earned praises from Manager Cocu and the media. He then helped the club go on to eight match victories between 5 February 2014 and 22 March 2014. At the end of the 2013–14 season, Zoet helped the club finish fourth place, as he went on to make thirty–seven appearances (29 times in the league) in all competitions. He finished fifth place in the Algemeen Dagblad's Most Valuable Player of the Eredivisie, as well as, finishing fifth place for the club's Player of the Season.

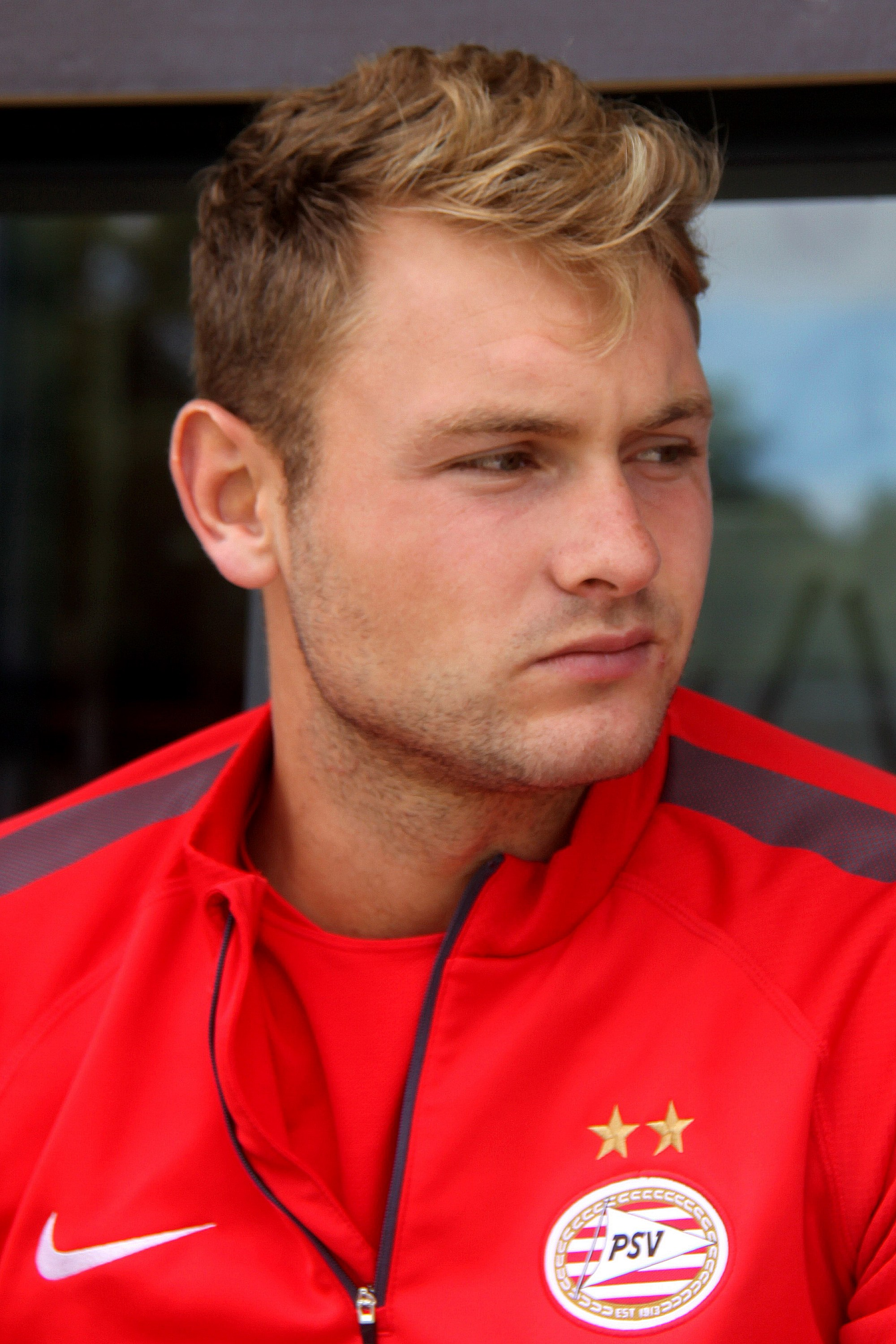
Zoet pictured in 2014 at the club's training camp

In the 2014–15 season, Zoet continued to remain as the club's first choice goalkeeper and was given a number one shirt following the departure of Tytoń, as well as, fought off competition from new signing Remko Pasveer. Zoet was linked with a move to Benfica but the move never happened, as he preferred to stay at PSV Eindhoven to develop further as a player. Zoet started the season well when he was involved in the club's winning start, including beating rivals, Ajax. Zoet then kept two clean sheets between 5 October 2014 and 18 October 2014 against Excelsior and AZ Alkmaar, in which he was the captain for the match. Although he conceded in a number of matches, the side went on a winning streak in the league for several months that saw PSV Eindhoven at the top of the table. At one point during a 2–1 win over Heracles Almelo on 9 November, Zoet acknowledged his mistakes in the match after he slipped of saved free kick from Oussama Tannane out of his hands, allowing Bryan Linssen to tap inside. At the beginning of January, he suffered his thumb injury during training, which he quickly recovered. Afterwards, he returned to training and the starting line-up, where the club continued on their winning streak in the league. This ended when they lost 3–1 to AFC Ajax on 4 March 2015. Despite this, the club went on to win the league title for the first time since 2008 after beating SC Heerenveen 4–1 on 22 April 2015; it was the first major trophy of his career. After being dropped for two matches in favour of Pasveer, Zoet returned to the starting lineup, in a 3–2 win over ADO Den Haag in the last game of the season. At the end of the 2014–15 season, Zoet went on to make forty–one appearances in akk competitions.

Ahead of the 2015–16 season, Zoet found himself being linked a move away from the club following the departure of Memphis Depay and Georginio Wijnaldum. But he ended up staying at PSV Eindhoven throughout the summer. He started the 2015–16 season well when he kept a clean sheet throughout the match, in a 3–0 win over FC Groningen to win the Johan Cruijff Schaal. Zoet then helped the side well when he was involved in the club's winning start that saw the club at the top of the table. Zoet made his UEFA Champions League debut on 12 September 2015, where he helped the side beat Manchester United. He captained the side for the first time this season, playing the whole game, in a 2–1 loss against CSKA Moscow on 30 September 2015. This was followed by captaining the next two matches against rivals, Ajax, and Excelsior. During a 6–3 win over De Graafschap on 24 October 2015, Zoet was subjected of being hit from an unknown object thrown by De Graafschap supporter; leading the club to apologise to him. Zoet impressed throughout the UEFA Champions League Group Stage campaign, keeping two clean sheets and ultimately saw the side go through to the knockout stage after beating CSKA Moscow 2–1. In November 2015, Zoet extended his contract with the club until 2019. He kept two clean sheets between 29 November 2015 and 5 December 2015 against AZ Alkmaar and Vitesse. Zoet then kept five clean sheets in a row between 7 February 2016 and 5 March 2016. They reached the last-16 of the tournament, where they faced Spanish side Atlético Madrid, resulting a 0–0 draw in the first leg. Zoet put in strong performances throughout the tie and was twice named to the team of the week. Following a draw on aggregate over both legs, PSV lost out to Atlético Madrid on penalties. As the 2015–16 season progressed, as the club was in a title race, Zoet continued to help the side by keeping three clean sheets in a row between 9 April 2016 and 19 April 2016. In the last game of the season against PEC Zwolle, Zoet won his third major prize at the end of the season after clinching another title for PSV Eindhoven by beating them 3–1. At the end of the 2015–16 season, he went on to make forty–four appearances in all competitions (having played all the league matches this season).

In the 2016–17 season, Zoet started the season well when he helped the side beat Feyenoord 1–0 to win the Johan Cruyff Shield. He then got off with a winning start for the side by keeping four clean sheets between 20 August 2016 and 10 September 2016. On 10 September 2016, Zoet made his 100th league appearance for PSV Eindhoven against N.E.C., in a 4–0 win, earning his fourth clean sheets. He then started every match until he suffered a muscular problem that saw him out for a month. It wasn't until on 19 November 2016 when Zoet returned to the starting lineup from injury, in a 0–0 draw against Willem II, earning his fifth clean sheet of the season. In a follow up match against Atlético Madrid in the UEFA Champions League Group Stage on 23 November 2016, Zoet captained the side for the first time this season, in a 2–0 loss. He then kept two clean sheets in two matches between 3 December 2016 and 10 December 2016. By the end of 2016, Zoet conceded seven goals in the last fourteen matches. Throughout the 2016–17 season, Zoet expressed his optimism that the club would win the league for the third time in a row. He was at fault during a match against Feyenoord on 26 February 2017, conceding an own goal, which turned out to be a winning for the opposition team, as they won 2–1. Despite this, Zoet continued to remain as the club's first choice goalkeeper and redeem himself by keeping another two clean sheets in two matches between 18 March 2017 and 1 April 2017. However, the club failed to defend the title, ending their two seasons defence after they finished third place in the league. At the end of the 2016–17 season, Zoet went on to make thirty–seven appearances (playing thirty–one times in the league) in all competitions.

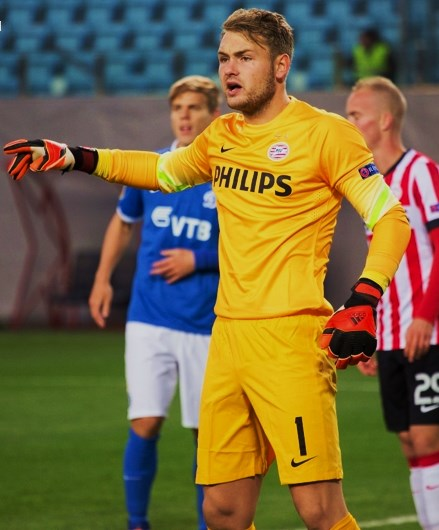
Zoet preparing to defend from a corner kick against Dynamo Moscow in the Europa League game on 2 October 2014

In the 2017–18 season, Zoet was appointed as the club's captain for the third straight season. However, started the season poorly when PSV Eindhoven were eliminated in the third qualifying round, in a 2–0 loss against NK Osijek on aggregate. Despite this, he helped the side got off the winning start that saw the club at the top of the table. Zoet captained the side for the first time this season, keeping a clean sheet, in a 4–0 win over SDC Putten in the first round of the KNVB Beker. Soon, he helped the side go on a ten consecutive victories in a row between 17 September 2017 and 3 December 2017. His development and performance was praised by Manager Cocu and making an average of 3.5 saves per ninety minutes. The January transfer window saw Zoet being linked a move away from PSV Eindhoven, with Espanyol interested in signing him, but the move never happened. Despite the transfer speculation, he continued to remain as the club's first choice goalkeeper and kept three clean sheets in three matches between 27 January 2018 and 7 February 2018. However, against Willem II on 10 March 2018, Zoet conceded five goals despite making a string of saves, as PSV Eindhoven lost 5–0. In a follow up match against VVV-Venlo on 17 March 2018, he was able to redeem himself when he helped the side beat them 3–0 and keeping a clean sheet in a process. Zoet started in goal for PSV on 15 April 2018, as they beat rivals Ajax 3–0 to clinch the Eredivise title. Despite the win, Zoet, however, suffered a groin injury that saw him miss two matches; where up to this point, he started every match. But Zoet returned in the last game of the season, where he started a whole game and kept a clean sheet, in a 0–0 draw against FC Groningen. At the end of the 2017–18 season, Zoet went on to make thirty–eight appearances (playing thirty–two times in the league) in all competitions.

Ahead of the 2018–19 season, Zoet was linked a move away from PSV Eindhoven, with Serie A side Napoli keen on signing him, but the club refused to sell him. But he ended the transfer speculation when he signed a contract extension, keeping him until 2021. At the start of the 2018–19 season, Zoet got off to a good start for the side, including qualifying for the UEFA Champions League Group Stage after beating Bate Borisov 6–3 on aggregate. The club's winning streak soon saw them at the top of the table; and during that time, Zoet kept five clean sheets in a row between 15 September 2018 and 20 October 2018, including a 3–0 win over rivals, Ajax. After the club earned their first league loss following a 2–1 loss against Feyenoord, Zoet then help bounce back and kept two clean sheets in two matches between 7 December 2018 and 15 December 2018. Zoet kept three clean sheets in three matches between 3 March 2019 and 17 March 2019.

=== Utrecht (loan) ===
On 15 January 2020, Zoet was sent on loan to FC Utrecht for the remainder of the 2019–20 season. He made seven Eredivisie and three KNVB Cup appearances for the club before the season's suspension in March.

=== Spezia ===
On 8 September 2020, Zoet joined newly promoted Serie A side Spezia Calcio on a two-year deal. He began the season as a starter, but in his second game for the club, against Udinese, he injured his groin, sidelining him until the winter break. In January 2021, he returned to the squad. He regained his starting spot for some appearances in March, but continued as a backup from April 2021 behind Ivan Provedel. He regained his position as a starter in the 4–1 win over Torino on 15 May 2021.

== International career ==
=== Youth ===
Zoet was first called up by Netherlands U17 in 2006. He went on to make thirteen appearances for Netherlands U17 for the side.

Later in 2008, Zoet was called up to the Netherlands U19 for the first time. He made his Netherlands U19 debut on 7 September 2008, where he started the whole game and kept a clean sheet, in a 5–0 win over Scotland U19. In the 2010 UEFA European Under-19 Championship, Zoet was called up to the U19 squad. He started all three matches, including keeping a clean sheet against England U19 but eventually lost in the group stage. Following the tournament, Zoet went on to make 12 appearances for the Netherlands U19 side.

In August 2010, Zoet was called up to the Netherlands U21 for the first time. He made his Netherlands U21 debut, several days later on 2 September 2010, starting the whole game, in a 2–1 loss against Spain U21. For the rest of 2011, Zoet kept three clean sheets in a row, although during the third match, he was sent–off in the 61st minute, in a 1–0 win against Austria U21. Throughout 2012, Zoet kept four clean sheets for the U21 side that saw them qualify for the UEFA European Under-21 Championship in Switzerland. After being called up to the UEFA European Under-21 Championship squad, Zoet started as the first choice goalkeeper. He started three times in the tournament before losing to Italy U21 in the semi–final. Following the end of the tournament, Zoet went on to make twenty–one appearances for the U21 side.

=== Senior ===
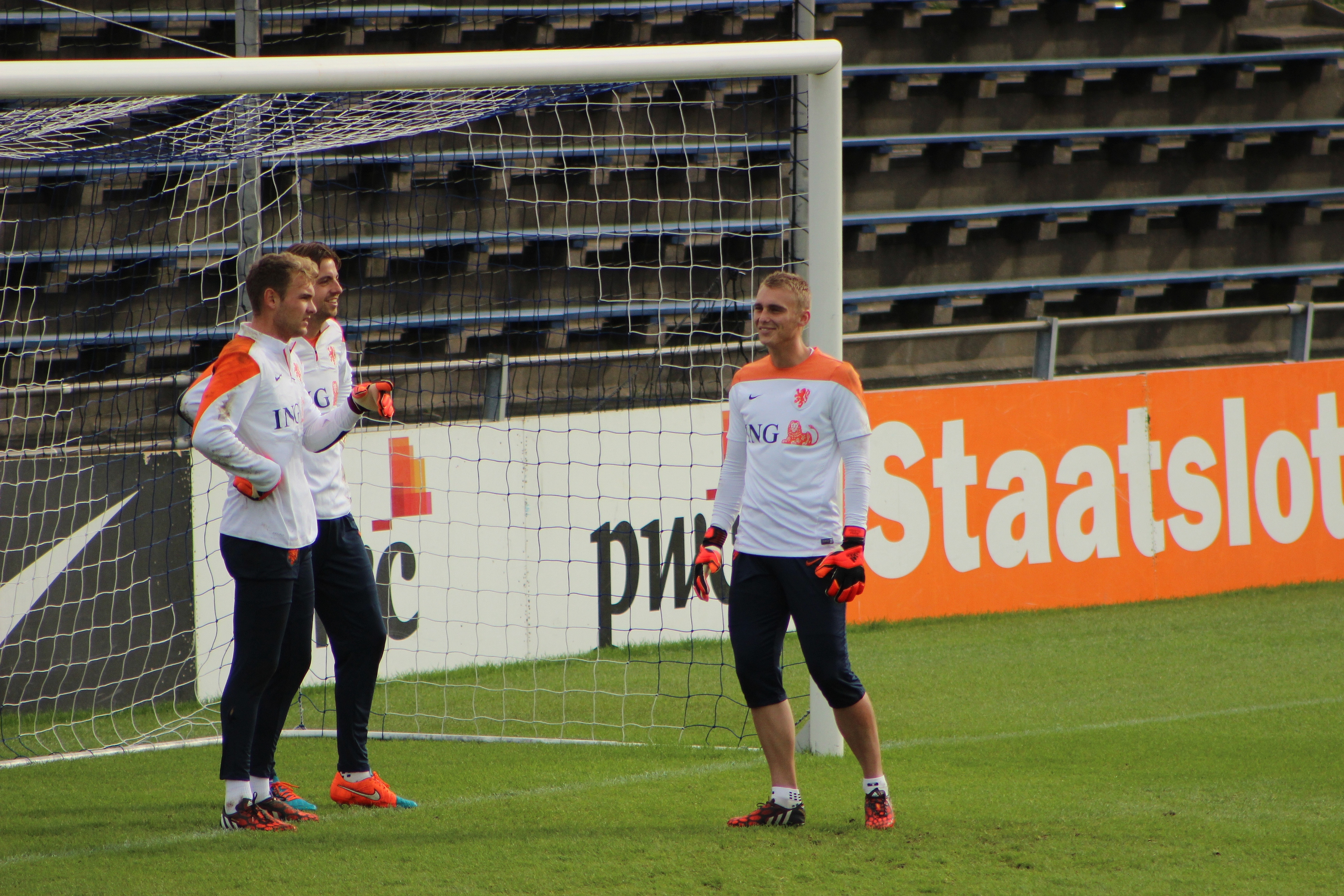
Zoet (left) training with Jasper Cillessen (furthest right) and Tim Krul in 2014

Zoet received his first call up to the senior Netherlands team in September 2012. He appeared twice as an unused substitute throughout 2012. Ahead of the 2014 FIFA World Cup in Brazil, Zoet were among four goalkeepers shortlisted to be included in the squad. In May 2014, Zoet was initially named by Manager Louis van Gaal for the provisional 30-man squad at FIFA World Cup in Brazil. However, he didn't make it to the final 23-man squad.

Zoet made his international debut on 10 October 2015, coming on as a late substitute for the injured Tim Krul in a 2–1 away win against Kazakhstan in a Euro 2016 qualifier. He then started the whole game in a follow–up match against Czech Republic, where he was fault for conceding the first two goals from the opposition team, as they lost 3–2, therefore ending hopes of qualifying for the UEFA Euro 2016. Over the years, Zoet found himself, competing with Jasper Cillessen for the national team's first choice goalkeeper. In a 2–0 loss against Bulgaria on 25 March 2017, Zoet was at fault for conceding two goals and his performance was criticised by the Dutch media. On 31 May 2017, Zoet captained the national team for the first time, as Netherlands beat Morocco 2–1.

== Personal life ==
According to Zoet's mother, Didy Zoet, she revealed that Jeroen wanted to be a professional footballer, something she was supportive with and that he considered PSV Eindoven to be his second mother. Zoet is good friends with darts player Michael van Gerwen.

In December 2015, Zoet was arrested along with then teammate Maxime Lestienne for fighting in the street. Following the incident, the pair apologised to the club's management for their actions. Zoet received two fines totalling 595 euros after police decided against charging him.

In January 2019, Zoet and his girlfriend Rosanne Grasman announced on their social media account that they are expecting their first child, a girl, in June.

== Career statistics ==
=== Club ===
As of match played 15 April 2026

Appearances and goals by club, season and competition
Club	Season	League			National cup (Note: Includes KNVB Cup, Coppa Italia.)		Europe		Other		Total	
Club	Season	Division	Apps	Goals	Apps	Goals	Apps	Goals	Apps	Goals	Apps	Goals
PSV Eindhoven	2008–09	Eredivisie	0	0	0	0	—		—		0	0
PSV Eindhoven	2013–14	Eredivisie	29	0	0	0	7 (Note: Four appearances in UEFA Champions League, three appearances in UEFA Europa League)	0	—		36	0
PSV Eindhoven	2014–15	Eredivisie	32	0	0	0	9 (Note: Appearance(s) in UEFA Europa League)	0	1 (Note: Appearance in Johan Cruyff Shield)	0	42	0
PSV Eindhoven	2015–16	Eredivisie	34	0	1	0	8 (Note: Appearance(s) in UEFA Champions League)	0	1	0	44	0
PSV Eindhoven	2016–17	Eredivisie	31	0	0	0	5	0	1	0	37	0
PSV Eindhoven	2017–18	Eredivisie	32	0	4	0	2	0	—		38	0
PSV Eindhoven	2018–19	Eredivisie	34	0	0	0	8	0	1	0	43	0
PSV Eindhoven	2019–20	Eredivisie	11	0	0	0	9 (Note: Two appearances in UEFA Champions League, seven appearances in UEFA Europa League)	0	1	0	21	0
PSV Eindhoven	Total		203	0	5	0	48	0	5	0	261	0
Jong PSV	2013–14	Eerste Divisie	1	0	—		—		—		1	0
RKC Waalwijk (loan)	2011–12	Eredivisie	34	0	4	0	—		4 (Note: Appearance(s) in European Play-offs)	0	42	0
RKC Waalwijk (loan)	2012–13	Eredivisie	33	0	2	0	—		—		35	0
RKC Waalwijk (loan)	Total		67	0	6	0	—		4	0	77	0
Utrecht (loan)	2019–20	Eredivisie	7	0	3	0	—		—		10	0
Spezia	2020–21	Serie A	7	0	0	0	—		—		7	0
Spezia	2021–22	Serie A	7	0	2	0	—		—		9	0
Spezia	2022–23	Serie A	5	0	2	0	—		—		7	0
Spezia	2023–24	Serie B	25	0	1	0	—		—		26	0
Spezia	Total		44	0	5	0	—		—		49	0
AZ Alkmaar	2024–25	Eredivisie	6	0	0	0	1	0	—		7	0
AZ Alkmaar	2025–26	Eredivisie	11	0	0	0	8 (Note: Appearance(s) in UEFA Conference League)	0	—		19	0
AZ Alkmaar	Total		18	0	0	0	8	0	—		26	0
Career total			340	0	19	0	56	0	9	0	424	0

=== International ===
As of match played 31 May 2018

Appearances and goals by national team and year
National team	Year	Apps	Goals
Netherlands	2012	0	0
Netherlands	2013	0	0
Netherlands	2014	0	0
Netherlands	2015	2	0
Netherlands	2016	4	0
Netherlands	2017	3	0
Netherlands	2018	2	0
Netherlands	2019	0	0
Total		11	0

== Honours ==
PSV Eindhoven

- Eredivisie: 2014–15, 2015–16, 2017–18
- Johan Cruijff Shield: 2015, 2016

AZ

- KNVB Cup: 2025–26

Netherlands U21

- UEFA U-21 Championship semi-finalist: 2013

Individual

- Social player of the year: 2015
- UEFA Champions League Team of the Year: 2015–16
