= Nicolas Isimat-Mirin =

French footballer (born 1991)

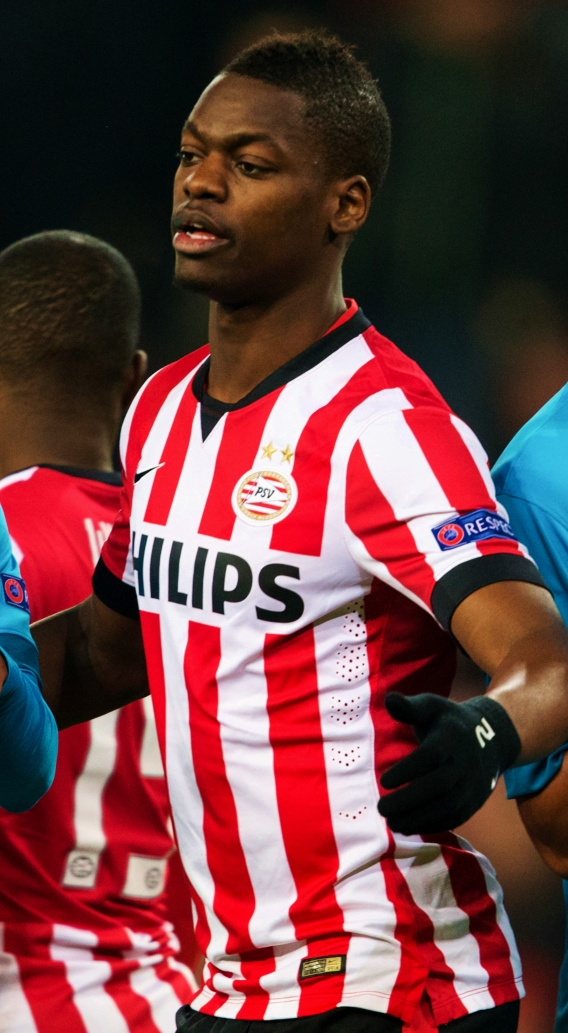
- Isimat-Mirin playing for PSV in 2015

Personal information
- Full name: Nicolas Johnny Isimat-Mirin
- Date of birth: 15 November 1991 (age 34)
- Place of birth: Meudon, France
- Height: 1.89 m (6 ft 2 in)
- Position: Centre-back

Youth career
- 2000–2005: US Roissy en Brie
- 2006–2007: Clairefontaine
- 2007–2009: Rennes
- 2009–2010: Valenciennes

Senior career*
Years	Team	Apps	(Gls)
2010–2013	Valenciennes	73	(1)
2013–2015	Monaco	6	(0)
2014–2015	→ PSV (loan)	15	(1)
2014	→ Jong PSV (loan)	1	(0)
2015–2019	PSV	78	(3)
2019–2021	Beşiktaş	14	(0)
2019–2020	→ Toulouse (loan)	14	(1)
2021–2022	Sporting Kansas City	41	(0)
2023–2024	Vitesse	43	(1)
2024–2026	Athens Kallithea	24	(2)
Total		309	(9)

International career
2010–2011	France U20	5	(0)
2011	France U21	3	(0)
- * Club domestic league appearances and goals

Nicolas Johnny Isimat-Mirin (French: [nikɔla izima miʁɛ̃]; born 15 November 1991) is a French former professional footballer who played as a centre-back. He won three Eredivisie titles with PSV.

Born in Meudon in the southwestern suburbs of Paris, Isimat-Mirin came through the Clairefontaine academy and began his senior career at Valenciennes, making his professional debut in 2010 and establishing himself in Ligue 1. He moved to Monaco in 2013 but made few appearances before joining Eredivisie club PSV, on loan in 2014 and permanently the following year. He remained at PSV until 2019, also winning two Johan Cruyff Shields. He subsequently played for Beşiktaş in Turkey and spent a season on loan at Toulouse, before later spells with Sporting Kansas City, Vitesse and Athens Kallithea.

Isimat-Mirin represented France at under-20 and under-21 level. He retired in February 2026 and joined PSV's academy as assistant coach of the under-16 team.

== Early career ==
Isimat-Mirin was born in Meudon, in the southwestern suburbs of Paris, to Guadeloupean parents. When he was six years old, his family moved to Roissy-en-Brie. Isimat-Mirin began his career at France at Roissy-en-Brie. During his time there, he became friends with Paul Pogba, Florentin Pogba and Mathias Pogba. Isimat-Mirin then moved to Clairefontaine football academy and is a graduate of football academy.

== Club career ==
=== Valenciennes ===
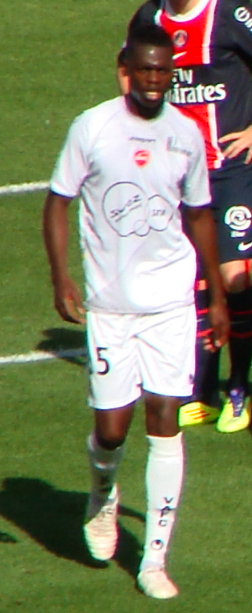
Isimat-Mirin playing for Valenciennes in 2011.

After two seasons at Rennes' youth academy after departing Clairefontaine, Isimat-Mirin joined Valenciennes in 2009 and spent his first season with the club's reserve team. Promoted to the first team by manager Philippe Montanier, he made his professional debut on 21 September 2010 as a substitute in a Coupe de la Ligue win over Nîmes, and made his league debut against Brest five days later. He signed his first professional contract, a three-year deal, in October 2010 and made 13 appearances in the 2010–11 season.

Isimat-Mirin established himself in the side in the 2011–12 season, signing a contract extension until 2015 and scoring his first goal for the club, against Auxerre, in November 2011; he was also twice sent off, and finished the season with 36 appearances and two goals. The following season he drew interest from Lille and Paris Saint-Germain, with a €2.5 million bid rejected, but he remained at the club, where a series of injuries disrupted his campaign. He made 31 appearances before joining Monaco in 2013.

=== AS Monaco ===
On 28 June 2013, Isimat-Mirin left Valenciennes to join the newly promoted Ligue 1 side AS Monaco on a four–year contract for a transfer fee costing 4 million euros. Upon joining the club, he said: "I am very happy to have landed here", he assures, with a smile on her face. Even though I know that there will be enormous competition for my position (Medjani, Abidal, Carvalho). But I am armed for this. Moreover, seeing such names and such recruits is somewhat reassuring because it proves that the club wants to give itself the means to achieve its ambitions."

Having appeared on the substitute bench for the next four months, Isimat-Mirin made his debut for AS Monaco, starting the whole game, in a 1–0 loss against Reims in the third round of the Coupe de la Ligue. A month later on 30 November 2013, he made his league debut for the club against Rennes, coming on as a 61st-minute substitute, in a 2–0 win. The beginning saw Isimat-Mirin received a number of first team starts, making a total of nine appearances. However, he struggled to regain his first team place, due to competitions in the centre–back positions.

Ahead of the 2014–15 season, Isimat-Mirin was linked a move away from Monaco, as Saint-Étienne was interested in signing him. The transfer move was agreed in early–August, but it was later broken down.

=== PSV ===
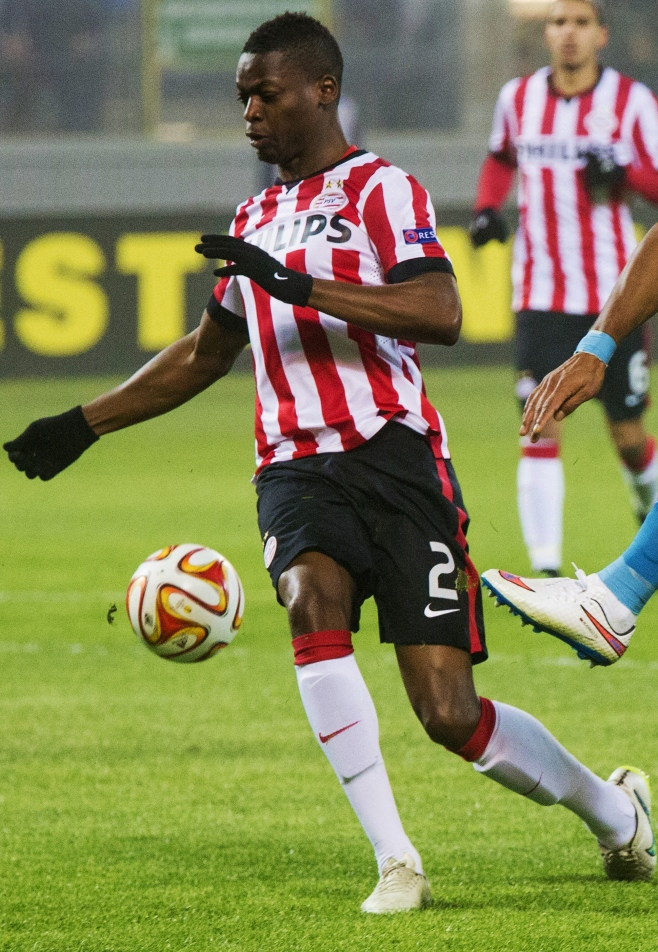
Isimat-Mirin playing for PSV in a UEFA Europa League match against Zenit Saint Petersburg in 2015

On 1 September 2014, Isimat-Mirin joined PSV on loan from Monaco for the season. He made his debut in a KNVB Cup win over Utrecht in September and his league debut against AZ in October. Deputising at centre-back during an absence of Jeffrey Bruma, he scored his first goal for the club against Groningen in March 2015. PSV went on to win the Eredivisie, their first league title since 2008 and the first major honour of Isimat-Mirin's career; he made 25 appearances across the season. In June 2015 he joined the club permanently on a four-year contract.

He won the Johan Cruyff Shield at the start of the following season and helped PSV retain the title in the 2015–16 season, although he was not a regular starter, making 26 appearances. A second Johan Cruyff Shield followed in 2016, but PSV finished third in 2016–17, ending their run of titles; Isimat-Mirin made 37 appearances.

Isimat-Mirin was a regular in the 2017–18 season and was named in the Eredivisie's team of the month for February 2018. He started as PSV beat rivals Ajax 3–0 in April 2018 to clinch a third league title, again making 37 appearances. Under new manager Mark van Bommel the following season he was deemed surplus to requirements, and he made only six appearances before leaving for Beşiktaş in January 2019.

=== Beşiktaş ===
On 6 January 2019, Isimat-Mirin signed for Beşiktaş, signing a three-and-a-half-year contract. Upon joining the club, he said: "I believe it is the right choice I have made. I will do my best to represent the colors of this club."

Isimat-Mirin made his debut for Beşiktaş, starting the whole game and kept a clean sheet, in a 3–0 win against Akhisarspor on 18 January 2019. However in a follow–up match against BB Erzurumspor on 25 January 2019, he suffered a waist injury that saw him substituted at half time. But Isimat-Mirin made a quick recovery and returned to the starting line–up against Antalyaspor on 3 February 2019, as the club won 6–2. He regained his first team place by starting in the next three matches. However, Isimat-Mirin suffered an injury during a match against Fenerbahçe on 25 February 2019 and was out for several weeks. It wasn't until on 8 April 2019 when he made his return to the starting line–up against Çaykur Rizespor and helped Beşiktaş win 7–2. Following this, Isimat-Mirin helped the club finish third place in the league. At the end of the 2018–19 season, he went on to make fourteen appearances in all competitions.

Ahead of the 2019–20 season, Isimat-Mirin was told by the Beşiktaş’ management that he can leave the club following his disappointment performance. As a result, Beşiktaş were planning to sell him, with Göztepe and Amiens were among interested. Following his loan spell at Toulouse ended, Isimat-Mirin continued to be linked a move away from the club, as Zulte Waregem and Hatayspor were interested in signing him. But he announced his intention to return to Beşiktaş ahead of the 2020–21 season. However, the club said that Isimat-Mirin were among four players left out of the squad. The contract between Beşiktaş and the player was mutually terminated on 1 February 2021.

==== Toulouse (loan) ====
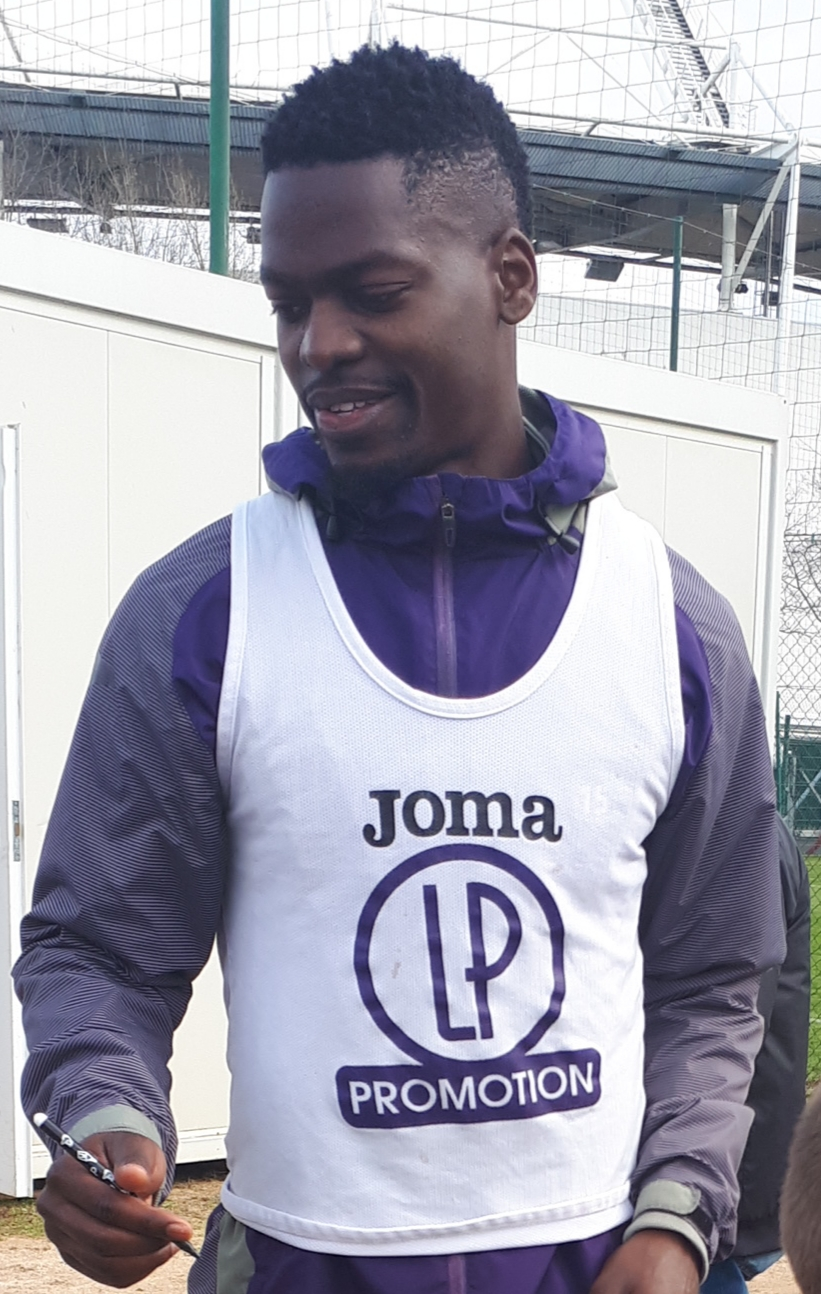
Isimat-Mirin training ahead of the Toulouse match in 2019.

On 21 August 2019, Isimat-Mirin was loaned out to French outfit Toulouse for the 2019–20 season.

Having appeared in the substitute bench for the next three matches since joining the club, he made his Toulouse debut against Nîmes Olympique on 21 September 2019 and started the whole game, in a 1–0 loss. Since joining the club, Isimat-Mirin quickly established himself in the starting eleven, playing in the centre–back position. On 7 December 2019, he scored his first goal for Toulouse, scoring the opening goal of the game, in a 4–2 loss against RC Strasbourg. After missing one match due to suspension, Isimat-Mirin returned to the starting line–up against Lyon in the last 16 of the Coupe de la Ligue, as the club lost 4–1 on 18 December 2019. However, he was sidelined for a month after suffering an injury earlier this year. Isimat-Mirin returned to the starting line–up against Lille on 22 February 2020, as Toulouse lost 3–0. However, his return was short–lived when the LFP elected to end the season early due to the coronavirus pandemic, resulting in the club's relegation. Having made sixteen appearances and scoring once in all competitions for Toulouse, Isimat-Mirin returned to his parent club.

=== Sporting Kansas City ===
A couple days later, Isimat-Mirin signed a two-year contract with Major League Soccer side Sporting Kansas City. Upon joining the club, he was given a number five shirt. Following the 2022 season, his contract option was declined by Kansas City.

=== Vitesse ===
In January 2023 Isimat-Mirin signed a contract with Vitesse until the end of the 2023–24 season.

=== Athens Kallithea and retirement ===
On 2 August 2024, Isimat-Mirin joined Athens Kallithea FC.

In February 2026, Isimat-Mirin announced the end of his playing career and a move into coaching.

== International career ==
Isimat-Mirin is eligible to play for Guadeloupe through his parents. He later said it would be a "pride for him to try to represent the Guadeloupe colors".

In May 2011, Isimat-Mirin was called up to the France U20 for the first time. He made his U20 national team debut, starting the whole game, in a 4–1 win against Mexico U20 on 2 June 2011. Isimat-Mirin went on to make five appearances for France U20 side.

In August 2011, Isimat-Mirin was called up to the France U21 squad for the first time. He made his U21 national team debut, starting the whole game, in a 1–0 win against Portugal U21 on 5 September 2011. Isimat-Mirin later made two more appearances for France U21 side.

== Coaching career ==
In February 2026, Isimat-Mirin joined PSV's coaching staff as assistant coach of the under-16 team.

== Personal life ==
Isimat-Mirin dismissed rumors that his family came from Haiti. Isimat-Mirin is second youngest of family, as he has four brothers and one sister. His mother worked as a carer for elderly people with mental problems, while his father worked "at the town hall of Paris". Isimat-Mirin spoke fondly about his father, acknowledging his admiration of him and credited him for pushing him. In April 2019, he became a first time father when his wife Kimberly Mirin, gave birth to a baby girl named Azaya.

Isimat-Mirin said about his music career, saying: "I had a lot of positive reactions and even recorded the song in a music studio. It was a nice joke and a nice memory of the previous season, but we are now starting a new season. That is what I concentrate completely on. I am a football player, not a singer. And I am looking forward to starting again." In addition to speaking French, he speaks English, Dutch and Spanish.

== Honours ==
PSV Eindhoven

- Eredivisie: 2014–15, 2015–16, 2017–18
- Johan Cruyff Shield: 2015, 2016
