= Abel Tamata =

Dutch footballer

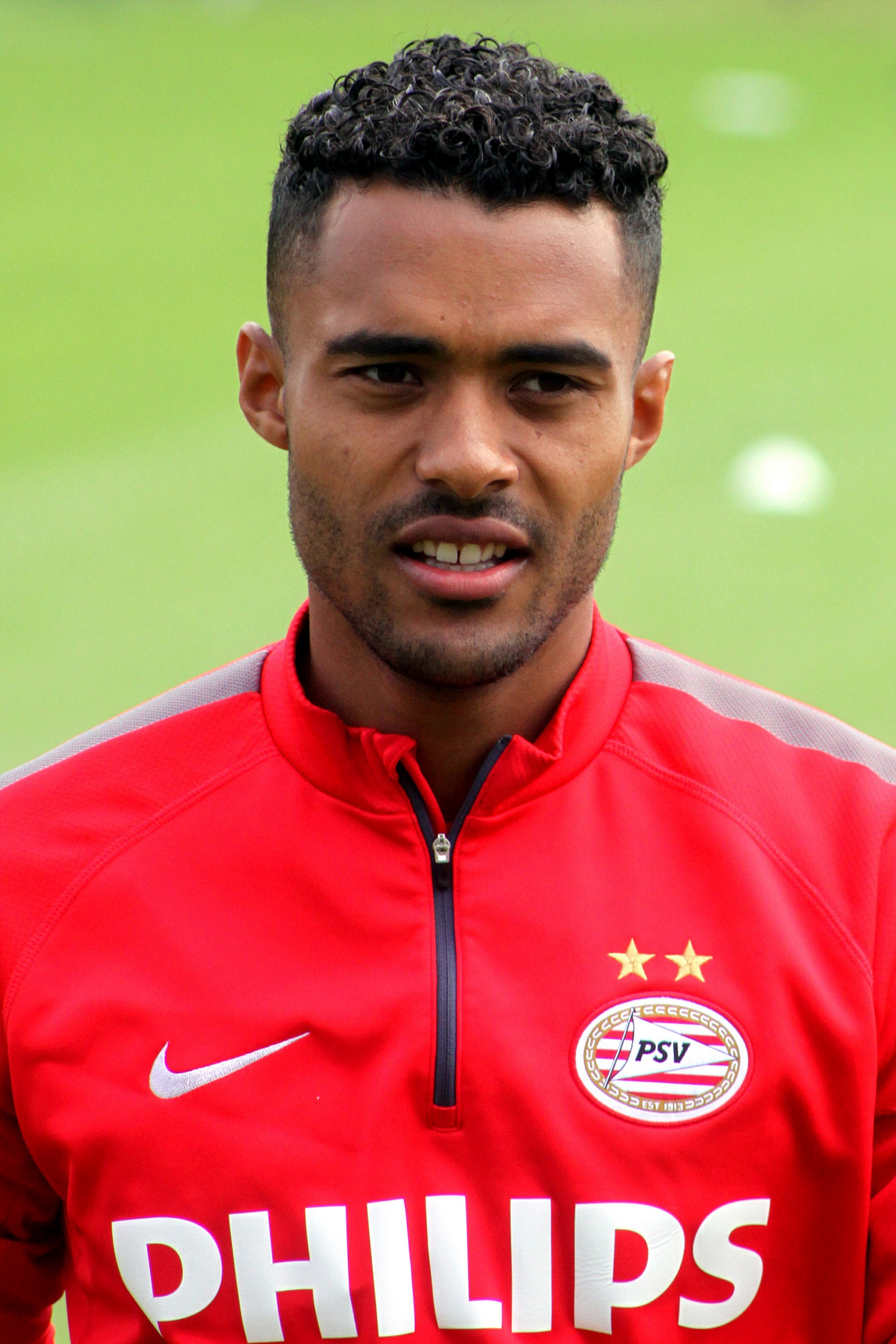
- Tamata with PSV in July 2014

Personal information
- Date of birth: 5 December 1990 (age 35)
- Place of birth: Bergen op Zoom, Netherlands
- Height: 1.84 m (6 ft 1/2 in)
- Position: Left back

Youth career
- SV DOSKO
- NAC Breda
- 2007–2010: PSV

Senior career*
Years	Team	Apps	(Gls)
2010–2015	PSV	28	(0)
2012–2013	→ Roda JC Kerkrade (loan)	22	(0)
2013–2015	→ Jong PSV	30	(0)
2015–2016	Groningen	14	(0)
2017	ADO Den Haag	0	(0)
Total		94	(0)

International career^{‡}
2015	DR Congo	1	(0)
- * Club domestic league appearances and goals as of 12 June 2017 ‡ National team caps and goals as of 18:54, 30 June 2015 (UTC)

Abel Tamata (born 5 December 1990) is a retired professional footballer who played as a left back.

Born in the Netherlands, he played international football for the DR Congo. Tamata has previously played for PSV, Roda JC Kerkrade, Groningen and ADO Den Haag.

== Early and personal life ==
Tamata was born in Bergen op Zoom to a Dutch mother and a Congolese father. His father worked as a taxi driver. He has a half-sister on his mother's side, and two half-brothers on his father's side. His manager is rapper Ali B, who is married to Tamata's half-sister. Tamata is a Jehovah's Witness.

== Club career ==
=== PSV Eindhoven ===
Having previously played in the academy at SV DOSKO and NAC Breda, Tamata joined PSV's youth system in 2007. After progressing through the academy, Tamata made his PSV Eindhoven debut in the UEFA Europa League, starting the whole game, in a 0–0 draw against Metalist Kharkiv on 16 December 2010. His next appearance came on 17 March 2011 in the last 16 of the UEFA Europa League, in a 1–0 win over Rangers. After appearing as an unused substitute, in a 1–0 win over Utrecht on 20 March 2011 following his call-up to the first team for the first time, Two days after making a tackle on Eduardo Salvio that ended his season, during a UEFA Europa League match, Tamata made his league debut for the side, where he started and played for 67 minutes, in a 2–0 win over Heracles Almelo on 17 April 2011. At the end of the 2010–11 season, in which he made six appearances, Tamata signed a contract with the club, keeping him until 2013.

In the 2011–12 season, Tamata appeared in a handful of first team appearances and competed for the left-back position with Erik Pieters and Jetro Willems. Although Willems established himself in the left-back position at the start of the season, Tamata appeared on the substitute bench. However, in his second start of the season, which saw PSV Eindhoven draw 2–2 with Twente, on 29 October 2011, he suffered a calf injury in early of the first half and was substituted as a result. Following this, Tamata had an operation and was sidelined until the end of the year. However, his recovery of returning to the first team was further delayed and never appeared in the first team for the rest of the season. Despite this, he only made a return from injury on 19 April 2012, in a 4–3 win over Jong AGOVV/Vitesse.

Whilst on loan at Roda JC Kerkrade, it was announced on 18 September 2012 that Tamata extended his two-year contract with the club, keeping him until 2015. After returning from a loan at Roda JC Kerkrade, Tamata was sent to play for Jong PSV for the next two seasons. Despite this, Tamata was called up to the first team following Willems' absent. He made his first appearance of the 2013–14 season, where he played 19 minutes, in a 4–0 win over Ajax on 22 September 2013. In the absence of Willems, Tamata was called up to the first team and featured in the left-back position for the rest of the year. After suffering a groin injury, Tamata returned and played the last two matches of the season for the side.

In the 2014–15 season, Tamata started out in the left-back position at the start of the season following Willems' injury. However, in a 2–0 win over Shakhtyor Soligorsk in the second leg play-off round of the UEFA Europa League, Tamata suffered a fractured foot and was sidelined for two months. After recovering from a fractured foot, he returned to the reserve side for the whole year. After being injured at the beginning of 2015, Tamata played two matches following Willems' injury. After making his last home appearances against Heracles Almemo on 5 May 2015,

It was announced that Tamata was leaving PSV Eindhoven at the end of the 2014–15 season. It believed it was Tamata's decision to leave the club.

=== Loan Spell at Roda JC Kerkrade ===
It was announced on 7 July 2012 that Tamata joined Roda JC Kerkrade on a season-long deal for the 2012–13 season, a move he believed it can take a new step to development.

Tamata made his Roda JC debut, starting the whole game in the left-back position, in a 1–1 draw against PEC Zwolle in the opening game of the season. He then set up a goal for Amin Affane to score an equaliser, but lost 3–2 to FC Groningen on 30 September 2012. However, he suffered a knee injury during a 0–0 draw against NEC Nijmegen and was out for the whole year.

After returning to training, he returned to the first team on 20 January 2013, in a 2–0 win over NEC Nijmegen. However, in a 4–0 loss against Utrecht on 24 February 2013, Tamata was sent-off in the 18th minute, for a foul on Édouard Duplan. After the match, Tamata was initially about to serve a one-match suspension but Manager Ruud Brood disagreed, claiming that there was no contact between the pair and had his suspension rescinded. Despite being sidelined with injuries as the season progressed,

=== FC Groningen ===
After being released by PSV Eindhoven, it was announced on 30 June 2015 that Tamata joined Groningen, signing a two-year contract, keeping him until 2017. Tamata was previously linked with a move to Twente and Empoli before joining FC Groningen.

Tamata made his FC Groningen debut, starting the whole game, in a 3–0 loss against his former club, PSV Eindhoven, in the Johan Cruyff Shield. He made his league debut for the club, in the opening game of the season, in a 1–1 draw against Twente. However, Tamata suffered an injury in the final minutes of the match and was sidelined for six weeks. After returning to the first team from injury, Tamata found himself struggling to regain his first team place following the arrival of Manager Ernest Faber and his own injury concerns.

With his first team opportunities limited in the 2017–18 season, Tamata, along with Hedwiges Maduro, were told by the club that they both can leave the club. Shortly after, it was announced that Tamata left Groningen by mutual consent.

=== ADO Den Haag ===
After leaving Groningen, Tamata was offered a move to join VVV-Venlo in January 2017 but rejected the offer. Shortly after, Tamata instead join ADO Den Haag on a deal that last until the end of the season.

However, Tamata struggled to make an impression at ADO Den Haag after suffering an injury; and following his recovery, he spent the rest of the season on the substitute bench. At the end of the 2016–17 season, Tamata was released by the club, without making an appearance for the side.

== International career ==
Tamata is eligible to play for DR Congo and Netherlands but is favour of playing for Congo.

In March 2015, Tamata received his first call-up for the DR Congo national team for a training camp in Dubai. He made his international debut later that year.
