= Suently Alberto =

Association footballer (born 1996)

Personal information
- Date of birth: 9 June 1996 (age 30)
- Place of birth: Rotterdam, Netherlands
- Height: 1.90 m (6 ft 3 in)
- Position: Centre-back

Team information
- Current team: FC Skillz

Youth career
- –2013: PSV

Senior career*
Years	Team	Apps	(Gls)
2013–2017	PSV	1	(0)
2013–2017	Jong PSV	79	(5)
2017–2018	NEC	1	(0)
2018–2020	Sparta	4	(0)
2018–2019	Jong Sparta	17	(0)
2021–2022	Pandurii Târgu Jiu	20	(1)
2023–2025	RVVH		
2025-	FC Skillz		

International career
2010	Netherlands U15	5	(0)
2011–2012	Netherlands U16	3	(0)
2012	Netherlands U17	3	(0)
2014	Netherlands U19	4	(0)
2017–2022	Curaçao	11	(0)
- * Club domestic league appearances and goals as of 16:06, 24 January 2024 (UTC)

Suently Alberto (born 9 June 1996) is a footballer who plays as a centre-back for Dutch amateur side FC Skillz. Born in the Netherlands, he represented for the Curaçao national team.

== Club career ==
Alberto made his professional debut for Jong PSV in the Eerste Divisie on 28 March 2014, facing Fortuna Sittard in a 2–1 away defeat, where he played the entire game. Throughout the 2013–14 season, he managed to make three appearances for Jong PSV. Subsequently, in the 2014–15 season, he earned his debut with the first team in a match against Heracles Almelo. Throughout that season, while representing Jong PSV, he participated in 18 matches, scoring two goals.

Between 2017 and 2020, he had short stints with NEC and Sparta Rotterdam. However, he had limited playing time, making only six total first-team appearances between the two clubs. He then played one season for Romanian Liga III club Pandurii Târgu Jiu.

In 2023, Alberto announced his retirement from professional football. Instead, he pursued a civil career as a supervisor for Ludios, a company that provides after-school care for elementary school children. He also started playing amateur football for RVVH and later moved to FC Skillz.

== International career ==
A former youth international for the Netherlands, Alberto opted to represent Curaçao. Alberto made his debut for Curaçao in a 2–1 friendly win over Qatar on 10 October 2017.
