= 2015–16 PSV Eindhoven season =

PSV
2015–16 season
- Chairman: Peter Swinkels
- Head coach: Phillip Cocu
- Stadium: Philips Stadion
- Eredivisie: 1st
- KNVB Cup: Quarter-finals vs Utrecht
- Champions League: Round of 16 vs Atlético Madrid
- Johan Cruyff Shield: Winners
- Top goalscorer: League: Luuk de Jong (26); All: Luuk de Jong (32)
- Highest home attendance: 35,292 vs Manchester United (Champions League, 15 September 2015)
- Lowest home attendance: 14,500 vs Cambuur (KNVB Cup, 22 September 2015)
- Biggest win: 0–6 at Cambuur (Eredivisie, 12 September 2015); 6–0 vs SC Genemuiden (KNVB Cup, 27 October 2015)
- Biggest defeat: 2–0 at VfL Wolfsburg (Champions League, 21 October 2015); 0–2 vs Ajax (Eredivisie, 20 March 2016)
Home colours	Away colours	Third colours

During the 2015–16 season, PSV Eindhoven participated in the Dutch Eredivisie, the KNVB Cup, the Johan Cruyff Shield and the UEFA Champions League.

== Squad ==
First-team squad
Squad No.	Name	Nationality	Position (s)	Date of birth (age)	Signed from
Goalkeepers
1	Jeroen Zoet	(Netherlands)	GK	6 January 1991 (age 35)	Youth Academy
21	Luuk Koopmans	(Netherlands)	GK	18 November 1993 (age 32)	(Netherlands) Oss
22	Remko Pasveer	(Netherlands)	GK	8 November 1983 (age 43)	(Netherlands) Heracles Almelo
Defenders
2	Nicolas Isimat-Mirin	(France)	CB	15 November 1991 (age 35)	(France) Monaco
3	Héctor Moreno	(Mexico)	CB	17 January 1988 (age 38)	(Spain) Espanyol
4	Santiago Arias	(Colombia)	RB	13 January 1992 (age 34)	(Portugal) Sporting CP
5	Jeffrey Bruma	(Netherlands)	CB	13 November 1991 (age 35)	(England) Chelsea
14	Simon Poulsen	(Denmark)	LB	7 October 1984 (age 42)	(Netherlands) AZ
15	Jetro Willems	(Netherlands)	LB	30 March 1994 (age 32)	Youth Academy
20	Joshua Brenet	(Netherlands)	RB	20 March 1994 (age 32)	Youth Academy
25	Menno Koch	(Netherlands)	CB	2 July 1994 (age 32)	Youth Academy
Midfielders
6	Davy Pröpper	(Netherlands)	CM	2 September 1991 (age 35)	(Netherlands) Vitesse
7	Gastón Pereiro	(Uruguay)	AM	11 June 1995 (age 31)	(Uruguay) Nacional
8	Stijn Schaars	(Netherlands)	CM	11 January 1984 (age 42)	(Portugal) Sporting CP
10	Adam Maher	(Netherlands)	CM	20 July 1993 (age 33)	(Netherlands) AZ
18	Andrés Guardado	(Mexico)	DM	28 September 1986 (age 40)	(Spain) Valencia
23	Rai Vloet	(Netherlands)	AM	8 May 1995 (age 31)	Youth Academy
24	Marcel Ritzmaier	(Austria)	CM	22 April 1993 (age 33)	Youth Academy
28	Marco van Ginkel	(Netherlands)	DM	1 December 1992 (age 33)	(England) Chelsea
29	Jorrit Hendrix	(Netherlands)	DM	6 February 1995 (age 31)	Youth Academy
32	Kenneth Paal	(Netherlands)	DM	24 June 1997 (age 29)	Youth Academy
Forwards
9	Luuk de Jong	(Netherlands)	CF	27 August 1990 (age 36)	(Germany) Borussia Mönchengladbach
11	Luciano Narsingh	(Netherlands)	RW	13 September 1990 (age 36)	(Netherlands) Heerenveen
16	Maxime Lestienne	(Belgium)	LW	17 June 1992 (age 34)	(Qatar) Al-Arabi
17	Florian Jozefzoon	(Suriname)	RW	9 February 1991 (age 35)	(Netherlands) RKC Waalwijk
19	Jürgen Locadia	(Netherlands)	CF	7 November 1993 (age 33)	Youth Academy
27	Steven Bergwijn	(Netherlands)	LW	8 October 1997 (age 29)	Youth Academy

== Competitions ==
=== Pre-season friendlies ===
5 July 2015 Friendly	SV DOSKO	0–6	PSV	Bergen op Zoom
14:30		Report	Vloet 13'; Locadia 16'; Laursen 23'; Bergwijn 35'; Boljević 47'; Luković 60'	Stadium: Sportpark Meilust

11 July 2015 Friendly	Basel (Switzerland)	3–2	PSV	Solothurn, Switzerland
17:00	Gashi 22' (pen.); Embolo 45'; Callà 93'	Report	Bergwijn 37'; Narsingh 80'	Stadium: Stadion FC Solothurn; Attendance: 4.050

15 July 2015 Friendly	Lyon (France)	0–2	PSV	Aix-les-Bains, France
20:30		Report	Locadia 76' (pen.), 88'	Stadium: Stade Forestier; Attendance: 4.050

17 July 2015 Friendly	Monaco (France)	3–1	PSV	Châtillon, Italy
19:00	Cavaleiro 15' (pen.); El Shaarawy 85'; Martial 90'	Report	Locadia 84'	Stadium: Stadio "E. Brunod"

21 July 2015 Friendly	PSV	4–0	FC Eindhoven	Eindhoven
19:00	De Jong 3', 40'; N'Toko 42' (o.g.); Locadia 65'	Report		Stadium: Philips Stadion

25 July 2015 Friendly	Valencia (Spain)	1–0	PSV
	Alcácer 2'	Report

=== Johan Cruyff Shield ===
2 August 2015 Super Cup	Groningen	0–3	PSV	Amsterdam
		Report	De Jong 25', 63'; Maher 50'	Stadium: Amsterdam ArenA

=== Friendlies ===
5 January 2016	Hibernians (Malta)	2–1	PSV
	Farrugia 60'; Silva 89'		Vloet 9'

=== Eredivisie ===
==== League table ====
Pos	Team	Pld	W	D	L	GF	GA	GD	Pts	Qualification or relegation
1	PSV Eindhoven (C)	34	26	6	2	88	32	+56	84	Qualification for the Champions League group stage
2	Ajax	34	25	7	2	81	21	+60	82	Qualification for the Champions League third qualifying round
3	Feyenoord	34	19	6	9	62	40	+22	63	Qualification for the Europa League group stage (Note: Feyenoord qualified for the Europa League group stage by winning the 2015–16 KNVB Cup.)
4	AZ	34	18	5	11	70	53	+17	59	Qualification for the Europa League third qualifying round
5	Utrecht	34	15	8	11	57	48	+9	53	Qualification for the European competition play-offs (Note: Four teams played for one spot in the UEFA Europa League third qualifying round.)

Source: Eredivisie, NUsport, Soccerway
Rules for classification: 1) Points; 2) Goal difference; 3) Goals scored; 4) Head-to-head points; 5) Head-to-head goal difference; 6) Head-to-head away goals scored; 7) Play-off (only if deciding champion, European competitions, or relegation); 8) Draw.
(C) Champions

==== Results summary ====
Overall								Home						Away					
Pld	W	D	L	GF	GA	GD	Pts	W	D	L	GF	GA	GD	W	D	L	GF	GA	GD
34	26	6	2	88	32	+56	84	13	3	1	41	16	+25	13	3	1	47	16	+31

Last updated: 1 May 2016.

==== Matches ====
On 18 June 2015, the fixtures for the forthcoming season were announced.

8 August 2015 1	ADO Den Haag	2–2	PSV	The Hague
19:45	Alberg 25' (pen.); Schaken (yellow card) 45+1'; Meijers (yellow card) 70'; Wormgoor (yellow card) 86'; Hansen 90+5'; Kristensen (yellow card) 90+6'	Report	Maher 23'; Arias (yellow card) 24'; Lestienne (yellow card) 40'; De Jong 62'	Stadium: Kyocera Stadion; Attendance: 13,125; Referee: Richard Liesveld

16 August 2015 2	PSV	2–0	Groningen	Eindhoven
12:30	Narsingh 7', 76'; Guardado (yellow card) 45'	Report	Linssen (yellow card) 20'; Kappelhof (yellow card) 43'; Rusnák (yellow card) 45'; Burnet (yellow card) 52'; Tibbling (yellow card) 62'	Stadium: Philips Stadion; Attendance: 32,000; Referee: Danny Makkelie

22 August 2015 3	Heerenveen	1–1	PSV	Heerenveen
19:45	Cavlan 55' (pen.)	Report	Pröpper (yellow card) 54'; De Jong 66'	Stadium: Abe Lenstra Stadion; Attendance: 24,645; Referee: Eric Braamhaar

30 August 2015 4	PSV	3–1	Feyenoord	Eindhoven
16:45	Arias (yellow card) 21' (goal) 50'; Lestienne 37'; Locadia 81' (pen.); Hendrix (yellow card) 85'	Report	Bruma 4' (o.g.); Elia (yellow card) 80'; El Ahmadi (yellow card) 86'	Stadium: Philips Stadion; Attendance: 35,000; Referee: Björn Kuipers

12 September 2015 5	Cambuur	0–6	PSV	Leeuwarden
20:45	Van de Streek (red card) 8'; Dammers (yellow card) 73'	Report	De Jong 9' (pen.), 12', 42'; Pröpper 56'; Locadia 74', 89'	Stadium: Cambuur Stadion; Attendance: 9,821; Referee: Kevin Blom

19 September 2015 6	Heracles Almelo	2–1	PSV	Almelo
19:45	Tannane (yellow card) 28'; Fledderus 39'; Bruns 45'; Weghorst (yellow card) 47'	Report	De Jong 2'; Hendrix (yellow card) 56'	Stadium: Polman Stadion; Attendance: 12,034; Referee: Serdar Gözübüyük

26 September 2015 7	PSV	2–1	NEC	Eindhoven
20:45	De Jong 38'; Arias (yellow card) 63'; Locadia 76'	Report	Ritzmaier (yellow card) 20'; Woudenberg (yellow card) 60'; Santos 63' (pen.)	Stadium: Philips Stadion; Attendance: 32,500; Referee: Danny Makkelie

4 October 2015 8	Ajax	1–2	PSV	Amsterdam
14:30	Younes 10'; Tete (yellow card) 51'; Veltman (yellow card) 65'; Dijks (yellow card) 88'	Report	Pereiro 7', 79', (yellow card) 90'; Bruma (yellow card) 17'; Guardado (yellow card) 29'; Locadia (yellow card) 55'	Stadium: Amsterdam ArenA; Attendance: 51,154; Referee: Bas Nijhuis

17 October 2015 9	PSV	1–1	Excelsior	Eindhoven
20:45	Locadia (yellow card) 44'; Pröpper 62'	Report	Stans (yellow card) 44'; Kuipers (yellow card) 81'; Hasselbaink (yellow card) 83', (goal) 90+2'	Stadium: Philips Stadion; Attendance: 32,800; Referee: Jochem Kamphuis

24 October 2015 10	Twente	1–3	PSV	Enschede
19:45	Gutiérrez (yellow card) 31'; Ziyech 58'	Report	Brenet (yellow card) 21'; Bruma (yellow card) 40'; De Jong 52'; Locadia 84'; Pereiro 86'	Stadium: De Grolsch Veste; Attendance: 25,500; Referee: Kevin Blom

31 October 2015 11	De Graafschap	3–6	PSV	Doetinchem
20:45	Tesselaar (yellow card) 10'; Peters (yellow card) 37'; Driver 45'; Bannink 50'; Kabasele 64'	Report	Pröpper 3', 31'; Guardado 19', (yellow card) 54'; De Jong (yellow card) 53', (goal) 67'; Narsingh 83'; Pereiro 90+1'	Stadium: De Vijverberg; Attendance: 11,163; Referee: Bas Nijhuis

8 November 2015 12	PSV	3–1	Utrecht	Eindhoven
12:30	Moreno 2'; Maher (yellow card) 17'; Santiago Arias (yellow card) 56', (goal) 58'; De Jong 72'	Report	Ramselaar 49'; Conboy (yellow card) 58'	Stadium: Philips Stadion; Attendance: 34,100; Referee: Björn Kuipers

22 November 2015 13	Willem II	2–2	PSV	Tilburg
20:45	Falkenburg 55', 62'	Report	Pereiro 11', (yellow card) 85'; Pröpper (yellow card) 54'; De Jong 73'; Bruma (yellow card) 84'	Stadium: Koning Willem II Stadion; Attendance: 14,112; Referee: Serdar Gözübüyük

29 November 2015 14	PSV	3–0	AZ	Eindhoven
16:45	Luckassen 3' (o.g.); De Jong 15', 41', (yellow card) 61'; Pröpper (yellow card) 62'; Bergwijn (yellow card) 73'; Locadia (yellow card) 90'	Report	Luckassen (red card) 60'	Stadium: Philips Stadion; Attendance: 33,000; Referee: Richard Liesveld

5 December 2015 15	Vitesse	0–1	PSV	Arnhem
19:45		Report	Hendrix 90'	Stadium: GelreDome; Attendance: 16,879; Referee: Kevin Blom

12 December 2015 16	PSV	1–1	Roda JC	Eindhoven
19:45	Pröpper 74'	Report	Brenet 51' (o.g.); Van Peppen (yellow card) 74'; Dijkhuizen (yellow card) 87'	Stadium: Philips Stadion; Attendance: 33,700; Referee: Eric Braamhaar

19 December 2015 17	PSV	3–2	PEC Zwolle	Eindhoven
19:45	Pereiro 7', 15'; Moreno (yellow card) 55'; De Jong 75'; Brenet (yellow card) 76'	Report	Ehizibue (yellow card) 23'; Van Polen 40' (pen.); Veldwijk 43'; Nijland (yellow card) 57'; Bouy (yellow card) 72'; Sainsbury (yellow card) 90'	Stadium: Philips Stadion; Attendance: 34,000; Referee: Eric Braamhaar

17 January 2016 18	Feyenoord	0–2	PSV	Rotterdam
14:30	Kongolo (yellow card) 52'; Van Beek (yellow card) 66'	Report	Arias (yellow card) 16'; Moreno 49'; Pröpper (yellow card) 83'; Narsingh 84'	Stadium: De Kuip; Attendance: 47,500; Referee: Danny Makkelie

24 January 2016 19	PSV	4–2	Twente	Eindhoven
14:30	Moreno 21', 23'; Narsingh 37'; Jozefzoon 79'	Report	Oosterwijk 8'; Ede 69', (yellow card) 71'	Stadium: Philips Stadion; Attendance: 33,000; Referee: Pol van Boekel

27 January 2016 20	Excelsior	1–3	PSV	Rotterdam
20:45	Bruma 90' (o.g.)	Report	De Jong 8'; Hendrix 48'; Narsingh 59'	Stadium: Stadion Woudestein; Attendance: 3,700; Referee: Bas Nijhuis

30 January 2016 21	PSV	4–2	De Graafschap	Eindhoven
19:45	De Jong 17'; Pröpper 31'; Narsingh 44'; Pereiro 84'	Report	Van de Pavert 68'; Straalman 80'; Driver (yellow card) 90+3'	Stadium: Philips Stadion; Attendance: 32,500; Referee: Björn Kuipers

7 February 2016 22	Utrecht	0–2	PSV	Utrecht
16:45	Letschert (yellow card) 33'	Report	Arias 15'; Van Ginkel 21', (yellow card) 72'; Isimat-Mirin (yellow card) 43'	Stadium: Stadion Galgenwaard; Attendance: 19,224; Referee: Serdar Gözübüyük

14 February 2016 23	NEC	0–3	PSV	Nijmegen
16:45	Ritzmaier (yellow card) 2'; Kane (yellow card) 11'	Report	De Jong 16'; Locadia 67'; Van Ginkel 75'	Stadium: Stadion de Goffert; Attendance: 12,353; Referee: Kevin Blom

20 February 2016 24	PSV	2–0	Heracles Almelo	Eindhoven
19:45	Pröpper 3'; Pereiro 45' (pen.)	Report		Stadium: Philips Stadion; Attendance: 33,400; Referee: Danny Makkelie

27 February 2016 25	PSV	2–0	ADO Den Haag	Eindhoven
19:45	Arias (yellow card) 42'; Willems (yellow card) 65'; Van Ginkel 72'; De Jong 82'	Report	Malone (yellow card) 6'; Ebecilio (yellow card) 52'; Derijck (yellow card) 54'; Ebuehi (yellow card) 71'; Bakker (yellow card) 81'	Stadium: Philips Stadion; Attendance: 33,500; Referee: Dennis Higler

5 March 2016 26	Groningen	0–3	PSV	Groningen
19:45	Lindgren (yellow card) 12'; Linssen (yellow card) 73'	Report	Willems 7'; Pröpper 51'; Narsingh (yellow card) 74'; Locadia 88'	Stadium: Euroborg; Attendance: 21,983; Referee: Pol van Boekel

12 March 2016 27	PSV	1–1	Heerenveen	Eindhoven
19:45	De Jong 56'; Bruma (yellow card) 62'; Van Ginkel (yellow card) 89'	Report	Van Aken (yellow card) 26'; Otigba (yellow card) 35'; Marzo (yellow card) 50'; Te Vrede 53'	Stadium: Philips Stadion; Attendance: 34,100; Referee: Richard Liesveld

20 March 2016 28	PSV	0–2	Ajax	Eindhoven
16:45	Guardado (yellow card) 22'; Willems (yellow card) 26'; Hendrix (yellow card) 86'; Moreno (yellow card) 87'	Report	Milik 2'; Veltman (yellow card) 39'; El Ghazi 76'	Stadium: Philips Stadion; Attendance: 35,000; Referee: Björn Kuipers

2 April 2016 29	AZ	2–4	PSV	Alkmaar
19:45	Van der Linden 81'; Tanković 84'	Report	Pereiro 13'; Bruma (yellow card) 35'; Van Ginkel 43', 64'; Narsingh 60'	Stadium: AFAS Stadion; Attendance: 17,052; Referee: Serdar Gözübüyük

9 April 2016 30	PSV	2–0	Willem II	Eindhoven
20:45	Arias (yellow card) 16' (yellow-red card) 57'; Moreno (yellow card) 35'; Van Ginkel 68'; Zoet (yellow card) 71'; De Jong 79' (pen.)	Report	Lamprou (yellow card) 39'; Andersen (yellow card) 64'; Van der Struijk (yellow card) 77'; Ojo (yellow card) 90+1'	Stadium: Philips Stadion; Attendance: 34,500; Referee: Bas Nijhuis

16 April 2016 31	Roda JC	0–3	PSV	Kerkrade
20:45		Report	De Jong 10', 59'; Pröpper 81'	Stadium: Parkstad Limburg Stadion; Attendance: 17,159; Referee: Kevin Blom

19 April 2016 32	PSV	2–0	Vitesse	Eindhoven
20:45	Pröpper 12', (yellow card) 61'; Willems (yellow card) 53'; De Jong 71' (pen.); Bruma (yellow card) 77'	Report	Yeini (yellow card) 17'; Diks (yellow card) 70'; Van der Werff (yellow card) 86'	Stadium: Philips Stadion; Attendance: 34,000; Referee: Pieter Vink

1 May 2016 33	PSV	6–2	Cambuur	Eindhoven
14:30	Van Ginkel 15', 90+2'; De Jong 27'; Pereiro 38'; Moreno (yellow card) 61'; Maher 63'; Willems 70'; Arias (yellow card) 90'	Report	Mac-Intosch 18' (yellow card) 24'; Byrne 43', (yellow card) 50'; Andriuškevičius (yellow card) 78'; Monteiro (yellow card) 90'; Lachman (yellow card) 90+1'	Stadium: Philips Stadion; Attendance: 34,000; Referee: Björn Kuipers

8 May 2016 34	PEC Zwolle	1–3	PSV	Zwolle
14:30	Dekker (yellow card) 39'; Lam (yellow card) 61'; Bouy 66'; El Hasnaoui (yellow card) 72'	Report	Locadia 34'; Arias (yellow card) 39'; De Jong 43', 67'	Stadium: IJsseldelta Stadion; Attendance: 12,500; Referee: Pol van Boekel

=== KNVB Cup ===
22 September 2015 Round 2	PSV	3–2	Cambuur	Eindhoven
20:45	Locadia 16'; Heerings 43' (o.g.); De Jong 78' (pen.)	Report	Andriuškevičius (yellow card) 6'; Ogbeche 66', 69' (pen.); Heerings (yellow card) 72'; Mac-Intosch (yellow card) 78'	Stadium: Philips Stadion; Attendance: 14,500; Referee: Dennis Higler

27 October 2015 Round 3	PSV	6–0	Genemuiden	Eindhoven
18:30	De Jong 8'; Pereiro 61', 63', 86'; Pröpper 65'; Moreno 68'	Report	Jansen (yellow card) 49'	Stadium: Philips Stadion; Attendance: 31,000; Referee: Allard Lindhout

16 December 2015 Round 4	Heracles Almelo	2–3	PSV	Almelo
20:45	Tannane (yellow card) 15', (goal) 50' (pen.); Bel Hassani 18'; Weghorst (yellow card) 52'; Droste (yellow card) 65'	Report	Locadia 36', 90+1'; Pasveer (red card) 48'; Castro 69' (o.g.); Arias (yellow card) 71'; De Jong (yellow card) 74'; Brenet (yellow card) 87'	Stadium: Polman Stadion; Attendance: 7,874; Referee: Björn Kuipers

4 February 2016 Quarter-Final	PSV	1–3	Utrecht	Eindhoven
20:45	van Ginkel (yellow card) 48'; Leeuwin 74' (o.g.); De Jong (yellow card) 81'; Moreno (yellow card) 89'	Report	Ramselaar 32', 58'; Haller 41'	Stadium: Philips Stadion; Attendance: 20,000; Referee: Richard Liesveld

=== UEFA Champions League ===
==== Group stage ====
Pos	Team	Pld	W	D	L	GF	GA	GD	Pts	Qualification	WOL	PSV	MUN	CSKA
1	(Germany) VfL Wolfsburg	6	4	0	2	9	6	+3	12	Advance to knockout phase	—	2–0	3–2	1–0
2	(Netherlands) PSV Eindhoven	6	3	1	2	8	7	+1	10	Advance to knockout phase	2–0	—	2–1	2–1
3	(England) Manchester United	6	2	2	2	7	7	0	8	Transfer to Europa League	2–1	0–0	—	1–0
4	(Russia) CSKA Moscow	6	1	1	4	5	9	−4	4		0–2	3–2	1–1	—

Source: UEFA
Rules for classification: Group stage tiebreakers

15 September 2015 1	PSV	2–1	Manchester United	Eindhoven
20:45	Moreno 45+2', (yellow card) 60'; Arias (yellow card) 55'; Narsingh 57'; Bruma (yellow card) 71'	Report	Depay 41'; Smalling (yellow card) 67'	Stadium: Philips Stadion; Attendance: 35,292; Referee: Nicola Rizzoli

30 September 2015 2	CSKA Moscow	3–2	PSV	Khimki
20:45	Musa 8'; Doumbia 21', 36' (pen.); Schennikov (yellow card) 86'	Report	Locadia (yellow card) 16'; Zoet (yellow card) 35'; Lestienne 60', 68'; Arias (yellow card) 43' (red card) 80'	Stadium: Arena Khimki; Referee: Ruddy Buquet

21 October 2015 3	VfL Wolfsburg	2–0	PSV	Wolfsburg
20:45	Naldo (yellow card) 43'; Dost 46'; Kruse 57'; Benaglio (yellow card) 90'	Report		Stadium: Volkswagen Arena; Attendance: 23,375; Referee: Alberto Undiano Mallenco

3 November 2015 4	PSV	2–0	VfL Wolfsburg	Eindhoven
20:45	Guardado (yellow card) 45+2'; Locadia 55'; Arias (yellow card) 81'; De Jong (yellow card) 85' (goal) 86'	Report	Arnold (yellow card) 30'; Caligiuri (yellow card) 39'; Naldo (yellow card) 90'	Stadium: Philips Stadion; Attendance: 35,000; Referee: Jonas Eriksson

25 November 2015 5	Manchester United	0–0	PSV	Manchester
20:45	Lingard (yellow card) 90+3'	Report	De Jong (yellow card) 82'; Arias (yellow card) 90+3'	Stadium: Old Trafford; Attendance: 75,321; Referee: Pavel Královec

8 December 2015 6	PSV	2–1	CSKA Moscow	Eindhoven
20:45	Pereiro (yellow card) 66'; Guardado (yellow card) 75'; De Jong (yellow card) 75' (goal) 78'; Bruma (yellow card) 83'; Pröpper 85'	Report	Wernbloom (yellow card) 36'; Nababkin (yellow card) 56'; Ignashevich 76' (pen.); Cauņa (yellow card) 77'	Stadium: Philips Stadion; Attendance: 34,000; Referee: David Fernández Borbalán

==== Knockout phase ====
===== Round of 16 =====
24 February 2016 First leg	PSV	0–0	Atlético Madrid	Eindhoven
20:45	Pereiro (yellow card) 54' (yellow-red card) 68'	Report	Savić (yellow card) 22'	Stadium: Philips Stadion; Attendance: 34.948; Referee: Daniele Orsato

15 March 2016 Second leg	Atlético Madrid	0–0 (a.e.t.) (0–0 agg.) (8–7 p)	PSV	Madrid
20:45		Report	Locadia (yellow card) 30'; De Jong (yellow card) 66'; Guardado (yellow card) 120+1'; Van Ginkel (yellow card) 120+1'	Stadium: Vicente Calderón Stadium; Attendance: 50,135; Referee: Mark Clattenburg
	Penalties
	Griezmann (penalty scored); Gabi (penalty scored); Koke (penalty scored); Saúl (penalty scored); Torres (penalty scored); Giménez (penalty scored); Filipe Luís (penalty scored); Juanfran (penalty scored)		(penalty scored) Van Ginkel; (penalty scored) Guardado; (penalty scored) Pröpper; (penalty scored) Bruma; (penalty scored) Moreno; (penalty scored) Lestienne; (penalty scored) Arias; (penalty missed) Narsingh

== Statistics ==
=== Appearances and goals ===
As of 8 May 2016

No.	Pos	Nat	Player	Total		ERE		UCL		KNVB Cup		Super Cup	
No.	Pos	Nat	Player	Apps	Goals	Apps	Goals	Apps	Goals	Apps	Goals	Apps	Goals
1	GK	(Netherlands) NED	Jeroen Zoet	44	0	34	0	8	0	0+1	0	1	0
2	DF	(France) FRA	Nicolas Isimat-Mirin	26	0	12+5	0	2+3	0	2+1	0	1	0
3	DF	(Mexico) MEX	Héctor Moreno	41	6	29	4	8	1	4	1	0	0
4	DF	(Colombia) COL	Santiago Arias	42	3	32	3	6	0	2+1	0	1	0
5	DF	(Netherlands) NED	Jeffrey Bruma	44	0	30+2	0	8	0	3	0	1	0
6	MF	(Netherlands) NED	Davy Pröpper	44	12	33	10	8	1	2	1	1	0
7	MF	(Uruguay) URU	Gastón Pereiro	39	14	15+14	11	2+4	0	1+2	3	0+1	0
8	MF	(Netherlands) NED	Stijn Schaars	16	0	2+10	0	0+1	0	3	0	0	0
9	FW	(Netherlands) NED	Luuk de Jong	43	32	31+1	26	6	2	4	2	1	2
10	MF	(Netherlands) NED	Adam Maher	20	3	8+6	2	3	0	2	0	1	1
11	FW	(Netherlands) NED	Luciano Narsingh	40	9	25+5	8	6+1	1	1+1	0	1	0
14	DF	(Denmark) DEN	Simon Poulsen	5	0	1+1	0	1+1	0	0	0	1	0
15	DF	(Netherlands) NED	Jetro Willems	18	2	11+4	2	2	0	1	0	0	0
16	FW	(Belgium) BEL	Maxime Lestienne	19	3	6+8	1	2+2	2	1	0	0	0
17	FW	(Netherlands) NED	Florian Jozefzoon	10	1	1+7	1	0	0	0+2	0	0	0
18	MF	(Mexico) MEX	Andrés Guardado	34	1	25	1	7	0	1	0	0+1	0
19	FW	(Netherlands) NED	Jürgen Locadia	42	12	23+6	8	6+2	1	4	3	1	0
20	DF	(Netherlands) NED	Joshua Brenet	38	0	21+5	0	6+1	0	4	0	0+1	0
21	GK	(Netherlands) NED	Luuk Koopmans	0	0	0	0	0	0	0	0	0	0
22	GK	(Netherlands) NED	Remko Pasveer	4	0	0	0	0	0	4	0	0	0
23	MF	(Netherlands) NED	Rai Vloet	4	0	0+1	0	0+1	0	0+2	0	0	0
24	MF	(Austria) AUT	Marcel Ritzmaier	0	0	0	0	0	0	0	0	0	0
25	DF	(Netherlands) NED	Menno Koch	0	0	0	0	0	0	0	0	0	0
27	FW	(Netherlands) NED	Steven Bergwijn	8	0	0+5	0	0+1	0	1+1	0	0	0
28	MF	(Netherlands) NED	Marco van Ginkel	16	8	13	8	2	0	1	0	0	0
29	MF	(Netherlands) NED	Jorrit Hendrix	37	2	21+5	2	5+2	0	3	0	1	0
30	DF	(Netherlands) NED	Jordy de Wijs	3	0	0+1	0	0+1	0	0+1	0	0	0

=== Goalscorers ===
As of 8 May 2016

Rank	No.	Nat.	Name	Eredivisie	Champions League	KNVB Cup	Johan Cruijff Shield	Total
1	9	(Netherlands)	Luuk de Jong	26	2	2	2	32
2	7	(Uruguay)	Gastón Pereiro	11	0	3	0	14
3	6	(Netherlands)	Davy Pröpper	10	1	1	0	12
3	19	(Netherlands)	Jürgen Locadia	8	1	3	0	12
5	11	(Netherlands)	Luciano Narsingh	8	1	0	0	9
6	28	(Netherlands)	Marco van Ginkel	8	0	0	0	8
7	3	(Mexico)	Héctor Moreno	4	1	1	0	6
8			Own goal	1	0	3	0	4
9	4	(Colombia)	Santiago Arias	3	0	0	0	3
9	10	(Netherlands)	Adam Maher	2	0	0	1	3
9	16	(Belgium)	Maxime Lestienne	1	2	0	0	3
12	15	(Netherlands)	Jetro Willems	2	0	0	0	2
12	29	(Netherlands)	Jorrit Hendrix	2	0	0	0	2
14	17	(Netherlands)	Florian Jozefzoon	1	0	0	0	1
14	18	(Mexico)	Andrés Guardado	1	0	0	0	1
Total				88	8	13	3	114

=== Clean sheets ===
As of 8 May 2016

Rank	No.	Nat.	Name	Eredivisie	Champions League	KNVB Cup	Johan Cruijff Shield	Total
1	1	(Netherlands)	Jeroen Zoet	13	4	0	1	18
2	22	(Netherlands)	Remko Pasveer	0	0	1	0	1
Total				13	4	1	1	18

=== Disciplinary record ===
As of 8 May 2016

No.	Nat.	Name	Eredivisie			Champions League			KNVB Cup			Johan Cruijff Shield			Total		
No.	Nat.	Name	Yellow card	(yellow card) (yellow-red card)	Red card	Yellow card	(yellow card) (yellow-red card)	Red card	Yellow card	(yellow card) (yellow-red card)	Red card	Yellow card	(yellow card) (yellow-red card)	Red card	Yellow card	(yellow card) (yellow-red card)	Red card
1	(Netherlands)	Jeroen Zoet	2	0	0	1	0	0	0	0	0	0	0	0	3	0	0
2	(France)	Nicolas Isimat-Mirin	1	0	0	0	0	0	0	0	0	0	0	0	1	0	0
3	(Mexico)	Héctor Moreno	4	0	0	1	0	0	1	0	0	0	0	0	6	0	0
4	(Colombia)	Santiago Arias	8	1	0	3	1	0	1	0	0	0	0	0	12	2	0
5	(Netherlands)	Jeffrey Bruma	6	0	0	2	0	0	0	0	0	0	0	0	8	0	0
6	(Netherlands)	Davy Pröpper	5	0	0	0	0	0	0	0	0	0	0	0	5	0	0
7	(Uruguay)	Gastón Pereiro	2	0	0	2	1	0	0	0	0	0	0	0	4	1	0
9	(Netherlands)	Luuk de Jong	1	0	0	4	0	0	2	0	0	0	0	0	7	0	0
10	(Netherlands)	Adam Maher	1	0	0	0	0	0	0	0	0	0	0	0	1	0	0
11	(Netherlands)	Luciano Narsingh	1	0	0	0	0	0	0	0	0	0	0	0	1	0	0
15	(Netherlands)	Jetro Willems	3	0	0	0	0	0	0	0	0	0	0	0	3	0	0
16	(Belgium)	Maxime Lestienne	1	0	0	0	0	0	0	0	0	0	0	0	1	0	0
18	(Mexico)	Andrés Guardado	4	0	0	3	0	0	0	0	0	1	0	0	8	0	0
19	(Netherlands)	Jürgen Locadia	3	0	0	2	0	0	0	0	0	0	0	0	5	0	0
20	(Netherlands)	Joshua Brenet	2	0	0	0	0	0	1	0	0	0	0	0	3	0	0
22	(Netherlands)	Remko Pasveer	0	0	0	0	0	0	0	0	1	0	0	0	0	0	1
27	(Netherlands)	Steven Bergwijn	1	0	0	0	0	0	0	0	0	0	0	0	1	0	0
28	(Netherlands)	Marco van Ginkel	2	0	0	1	0	0	1	0	0	0	0	0	4	0	0
29	(Netherlands)	Jorrit Hendrix	3	0	0	0	0	0	0	0	0	0	0	0	3	0	0
Total			50	1	0	19	2	0	6	0	1	1	0	0	76	3	1

== Transfers ==
=== Transfers in ===
First Team
Date from	Position	Nationality	Name	From	Fee	Ref.
1 July 2015	LB	(Denmark)	Simon Poulsen	(Netherlands) AZ	Free	
1 July 2015	GK	(Netherlands)	Luuk Koopmans	(Netherlands) Oss	€100,000	
1 July 2015	CB	(France)	Nicolas Isimat-Mirin	(France) Monaco	€2,400,000	
1 July 2015	DM	(Mexico)	Andrés Guardado	(Spain) Valencia	€2,800,000	
13 July 2015	CM	(Netherlands)	Davy Pröpper	(Netherlands) Vitesse	€4,500,000	
15 July 2015	AM	(Uruguay)	Gastón Pereiro	(Uruguay) Nacional	€6,000,000	
15 August 2015	CB	(Mexico)	Héctor Moreno	(Spain) Espanyol	€5,000,000	

=== Transfers out ===
First Team
Date from	Position	Nationality	Name	To	Fee	Ref.
1 July 2015	CB	(Netherlands)	Karim Rekik	(England) Manchester City	loan ended	
1 July 2015	GK	(Netherlands)	Danny Wintjens	(Netherlands) VVV-Venlo	loan ended	
1 July 2015	LW	(Netherlands)	Memphis Depay	(England) Manchester United	€27,500,000	
1 July 2015	LB	(Netherlands)	Abel Tamata	(Netherlands) Groningen	Free	
1 July 2015	GK	(Poland)	Przemysław Tytoń	(Germany) VfB Stuttgart	€1,000,000	
11 July 2015	AM	(Netherlands)	Georginio Wijnaldum	(England) Newcastle United	€20,000,000	
13 July 2015	DM	(Sweden)	Oscar Hiljemark	(Italy) Palermo	€2,500,000	

=== Loans in ===
First Team
Date from	Position	Nationality	Name	From	Fee	Ref.
12 July 2015	LW	(Belgium)	Maxime Lestienne	(Qatar) Al-Arabi	On loan	

=== Loans out ===
First Team
Date from	Position	Nationality	Name	To	Fee	Ref.

=== Overall transfer activity ===
==== Spending ====
Summer: ▼€17,600,000

Winter:

Total: ▼€17,600,000

==== Income ====
Summer: ▲€51,000,000

Winter:

Total: ▲€51,000,000

==== Expenditure ====
Summer: ▲€33,400,000

Winter:

Total: ▲€33,400,000

== Jong PSV ==
=== Squad ===
Note: Flags indicate national team as defined under FIFA eligibility rules; some limited exceptions apply. Players may hold more than one non-FIFA nationality.

No.	Pos.	Nation	Player
—	GK	NED	Nigel Bertrams
—	GK	NED	Jesse Bertrams
—	GK	NED	Zeus de la Paz
—	GK	NED	Luuk Koopmans
—	DF	ISL	Hjörtur Hermannsson
—	DF	NED	Jordy de Wijs
—	DF	NED	Suently Alberto
—	DF	NED	Augustine Loof
—	DF	NED	Sander Heesakkers
—	DF	NED	Bram van Vlerken
—	MF	NED	Clint Leemans

No.	Pos.	Nation	Player
—	MF	SRB	Andrija Luković
—	MF	NED	Kenneth Paal
—	MF	BEL	Olivier Rommens
—	MF	NED	Laros Duarte
—	MF	ISL	Albert Guðmundsson
—	FW	NED	Steven Bergwijn
—	FW	MNE	Aleksandar Boljević
—	FW	NED	Moussa Sanoh
—	FW	MNE	Boris Cmiljanić
—	FW	NED	Dani van der Moot
—	FW	DEN	Nikolai Laursen
—	FW	PER	Luiz da Silva

=== Transfers in ===
Reserves and Academy
Date from	Position	Nationality	Name	From	Fee	Ref.
1 July 2015	RW	(Denmark)	Nikolai Laursen	(Denmark) Brøndby	€1,300,000	
1 July 2015	DM	(Netherlands)	Laros Duarte	(Netherlands) Sparta Rotterdam	Free	
18 July 2015	AM	(Iceland)	Albert Guðmundsson	(Netherlands) Heerenveen		

=== Transfers out ===
Reserves and Academy
Date from	Position	Nationality	Name	To	Fee	Ref.
30 June 2015	CM	(Netherlands)	Farshad Noor	Free agent	Released	
30 June 2015	RW	(Belgium)	Zakaria Bakkali	(Spain) Valencia	Released	
30 June 2015	RW	(Netherlands)	Elvio van Overbeek	(Netherlands) Go Ahead Eagles	Released	
30 June 2015	RW	(Netherlands)	Mohamed Rayhi	(Netherlands) NEC	Released	
30 June 2015	CM	(Montenegro)	Andjelo Rudović	Free agent	Released	

=== Pre-season friendlies ===
Match	Date	Opponent	Venue	Result	Scorers	Report
1	15 July 2015	(Belgium) Dessel Sport	A	2–2	Moussa Sanoh, Sam Lammers	Report
2	25 July 2015	(England) Liverpool U21	A	–		
3	26 July 2015	(England) Corby Town	A	–		
4	31 July 2015	FC Volendam	A	–		

== Technical staff ==
Position	Staff
Manager	Phillip Cocu
Assistant manager	Ruud Brood; Chris van der Weerden
Goalkeeping coach	Ruud Hesp
Fitness coach	Egid Kiesouw
Team manager	Mart van den Heuvel
Academy director	Art Langeler

Last updated: 28 May 2015
