= 2016–17 PSV Eindhoven season =

PSV
2016–17 season
- General manager: Toon Gerbrands
- Head coach: Phillip Cocu
- Stadium: Philips Stadion
- Eredivisie: 3rd
- KNVB Cup: Second round vs Sparta Rotterdam
- Champions League: Group stage
- Johan Cruyff Shield: Winners
- Top goalscorer: League: Gastón Pereiro (10); All: Gastón Pereiro (11)
- Average home league attendance: 33,724
- Biggest win: 5–0 vs Willem II (Eredivisie, 9 April 2017
- Biggest defeat: 4–1 vs Bayern Munich (Champions League, 19 October 2016
Home colours	Away colours	Third colours

During the 2016–17 season, PSV Eindhoven participated in the Dutch Eredivisie, the KNVB Cup, the Johan Cruyff Shield and the UEFA Champions League.

== Squad ==
As of 31 January 2017

Note: Flags indicate national team as defined under FIFA eligibility rules; some limited exceptions apply. Players may hold more than one non-FIFA nationality.

No.	Pos.	Nation	Player
1	GK	NED	Jeroen Zoet
2	DF	FRA	Nicolas Isimat-Mirin
3	DF	MEX	Héctor Moreno
4	DF	COL	Santiago Arias
5	DF	GER	Daniel Schwaab
6	MF	NED	Davy Pröpper
7	FW	URU	Gastón Pereiro
8	MF	NED	Jorrit Hendrix
9	FW	NED	Luuk de Jong (Captain)
10	MF	NED	Siem de Jong (on loan from Newcastle United)
15	DF	NED	Jetro Willems
18	MF	MEX	Andrés Guardado (Vice-captain)

No.	Pos.	Nation	Player
19	FW	NED	Jürgen Locadia
20	DF	NED	Joshua Brenet
21	GK	NED	Luuk Koopmans
22	GK	NED	Remko Pasveer
23	MF	NED	Bart Ramselaar
25	MF	UKR	Oleksandr Zinchenko (on loan from Manchester City)
27	FW	NED	Steven Bergwijn
28	MF	NED	Marco van Ginkel (on loan from Chelsea)
29	DF	NED	Menno Koch
31	GK	NED	Hidde Jurjus
38	MF	SWE	Ramon Pascal Lundqvist

== Friendlies ==
2 July 2016 Friendly	VV Dongen	1–3	PSV	Dongen
16:00	Yoffe 67'	Report	Pereiro 30'; Locadia 32'; Verreth 81'	Stadium: De Biezen

8 July 2016 Friendly	PSV	0–1	Queens Park Rangers	Eindhoven
15:30		Report	Polter 51' (pen.)	Stadium: De Herdgang

13 July 2016 Friendly	PSV	2–1	Saint-Étienne	Thonon-les-Bains
19:00	Narsingh 21'; L. de Jong 60'	Report	Dabo 31'

16 July 2016 Friendly	Sion	1–2	PSV	Thonon-les-Bains
17:00	Lacroix 45'	Report	L. de Jong 37'; Jozefzoon 53'

18 July 2016 Friendly	PSV	5–0	Sporting CP	Lausanne
20:30	L. de Jong 4' (pen.), 52'; Locadia 21'; Hendrix 41'; Maher 48'	Report

21 July 2016 Friendly	PSV	3–0	Porto	Arnhem
21:00	Pröpper 23'; Felipe 34' (o.g.); Maher 76'	Report		Stadium: GelreDome

26 July 2016 Friendly	PSV	0–1	FC Eindhoven	Eindhoven
19:00		Report	Lieder 62'	Stadium: Philips Stadion

== Competitions ==
=== Johan Cruyff Shield ===
31 July 2016 Johan Cruyff Shield	Feyenoord	0–1	PSV	Amsterdam
18:00	Toornstra (yellow card) 31'	Report	Willems (yellow card) 31'; Pröpper 38'; Isimat-Mirin (yellow card) 53'	Stadium: Amsterdam ArenA; Referee: Serdar Gözübüyük

=== Eredivisie ===
==== League table ====
Pos	Team	Pld	W	D	L	GF	GA	GD	Pts	Qualification or relegation
1	Feyenoord (C)	34	26	4	4	86	25	+61	82	Qualification for the Champions League group stage
2	Ajax	34	25	6	3	79	23	+56	81	Qualification for the Champions League third qualifying round
3	PSV Eindhoven	34	22	10	2	68	23	+45	76	Qualification for the Europa League third qualifying round
4	Utrecht (O)	34	18	8	8	54	38	+16	62	Qualification for the European competition play-offs (Note: Four teams played for a spot in the Europa League second qualifying round.)
5	Vitesse	34	15	6	13	51	40	+11	51	Qualification for the Europa League group stage (Note: Vitesse qualified for the Europa League group stage by winning the 2016–17 KNVB Cup.)

Source: NUsport (in Dutch), Soccerway
Rules for classification: 1) Points; 2) Goal difference; 3) Goals scored; 4) Play-off (only for deciding champion and relegation); 5) Head-to-head points; 6) Head-to-head goal difference; 7) Head-to-head away goals scored; 8) Draw. (Note: Criteria 5-8 is only used if deciding Europa League play-off places)
(C) Champions; (O) Play-off winners

==== Results summary ====
Overall								Home						Away					
Pld	W	D	L	GF	GA	GD	Pts	W	D	L	GF	GA	GD	W	D	L	GF	GA	GD
34	22	10	2	68	23	+45	76	13	3	1	35	9	+26	9	7	1	33	14	+19

==== Matches ====
6 August 2016 1	Utrecht	1–2	PSV	Utrecht
19:45	Haller 16'	Report	Pröpper 51'; Pereiro 80'; Schwaab (yellow card) 71'; L. de Jong (yellow card) 74'	Stadium: Stadion Galgenwaard; Referee: Serdar Gözübüyük

14 August 2016 2	PSV	1–0	AZ	Eindhoven
16:45	Moreno 52'; Locadia (yellow card) 45'; Isimat-Mirin (yellow card) 45+2'	Report	dos Santos (yellow card) 71'	Stadium: Philips Stadion; Referee: Björn Kuipers

20 August 2016 3	PEC Zwolle	0–4	PSV	Zwolle
19:45	Mastour (yellow card) 90+1'	Report	Isimat-Mirin 22'; Hendrix 35'; L. de Jong 86'; Bergwijn 89'	Stadium: MAC³PARK Stadion; Attendance: 12,700; Referee: Pol van Boekel

28 August 2016 4	PSV	0–0	Groningen	Eindhoven
12:30	Arias (yellow card) 82'	Report	Bacuna (yellow card) 12' (yellow-red card) 32'; Padt (yellow card) 33'; Hateboer (yellow card) 43'; Linssen (yellow card) 43'; Reijnen (yellow card) 90+6'	Stadium: Philips Stadion; Attendance: 33,000; Referee: Bas Nijhuis

10 September 2016 5	NEC	0–4	PSV	Nijmegen
19:45	Dumić (yellow card) 16'; Fomitschow (yellow card) 36'	Report	Ramselaar 4'; Pereiro 10'; Brenet 20'; L. de Jong 24'	Stadium: Goffertstadion; Attendance: 11,600; Referee: Dennis Higler

18 September 2016 6	PSV	0–1	Feyenoord	Eindhoven
14:30		Report	Botteghin 82', (yellow card) 74'; Kuyt (yellow card) 37'; Vilhena (yellow card) 62'	Stadium: Philips Stadion; Attendance: 35,000; Referee: Kevin Blom

24 September 2016 7	Excelsior	1–3	PSV	Rotterdam
20:45	Bruins 26' (pen.)	Report	Narsingh 21'; L. de Jong 45+2'; Pröpper 83'	Stadium: Stadion Woudestein; Attendance: 4,400; Referee: Danny Makkelie

1 October 2016 8	Heerenveen	1–1	PSV	Heerenveen
19:45	Zeneli 72'; Mulder (yellow card) 88'	Report	St. Juste 75' (o.g.); Narsingh (yellow card) 85'	Stadium: Abe Lenstra Stadion; Attendance: 23,650; Referee: Pol van Boekel

15 October 2016 9	PSV	1–1	Heracles Almelo	Eindhoven
19:45	Pereiro 41'; L. de Jong (yellow card) 33'	Report	Armenteros 39'; Te Wierik (yellow card) 59'	Stadium: Philips Stadion; Attendance: 33,000; Referee: Bas Nijhuis

22 October 2016 10	PSV	1–0	Sparta Rotterdam	Eindhoven
19:45	Ramselaar 77'; Moreno (yellow card) 34'; Guardado (yellow card) 41'	Report	Dijkstra (yellow card) 27'; El Azzouzi (yellow card) 49'; Dumfries (yellow card) 83'	Stadium: Philips Stadion; Attendance: 33,800; Referee: Jochem Kamphuis

29 October 2016 11	Vitesse	0–2	PSV	Arnhem
19:45	Kruiswijk (yellow card) 53'	Report	Pereiro 12', 90+3'	Stadium: GelreDome; Attendance: 18,452; Referee: Björn Kuipers

5 November 2016 12	PSV	1–1	Twente	Eindhoven
19:45	Moreno 62', (yellow card) 65'; Pröpper (yellow card) 10'; Pereiro (yellow card) 90+4'	Report	Ünal 53'; Marsman (yellow card) 90+2'; Van der Lely (yellow card) 90+4'	Stadium: Philips Stadion; Attendance: 33,500; Referee: Serdar Gözübüyük

19 November 2016 13	Willem II	0–0	PSV	Tilburg
19:45		Report	Arias (yellow card) 34'; Willems (yellow card) 59'	Stadium: Koning Willem II Stadion; Attendance: 13,650; Referee: Richard Liesveld

26 November 2016 14	PSV	3–1	ADO Den Haag	Eindhoven
19:45	Pereiro 12' (pen.); Beugelsdijk 50' (o.g.); L. de Jong 55'; Zoet (yellow card) 57'	Report	Beugelsdijk 57' (pen.)	Stadium: Philips Stadion; Attendance: 32,700; Referee: Björn Kuipers

4 December 2016 15	Roda JC	0–0	PSV	Kerkrade
19:45	Werker (yellow card) 66'	Report		Stadium: Parkstad Limburg Stadion; Attendance: 14,017; Referee: Kevin Blom

10 December 2016 16	PSV	1–0	Go Ahead Eagles	Eindhoven
19:45	S. de Jong 68'	Report	Duits (yellow card) 54'; Nieveld (yellow card) 90+2'	Stadium: Philips Stadion; Attendance: 33,000; Referee: Ed Janssen

18 December 2016 17	Ajax	1–1	PSV	Amsterdam
16:45	Klaassen 48'; Ziyech (yellow card) 73'; Younes (yellow card) 86'	Report	S. de Jong 80'; Willems (yellow card) 37'	Stadium: Amsterdam Arena; Attendance: 51,998; Referee: Pol van Boekel

14 January 2017 18	PSV	2–0	Excelsior	Eindhoven
19:45	Van Ginkel 34'; Pröpper 59'	Report	Fortes (yellow card) 43'; Ondaan (yellow card) 65'	Stadium: Philips Stadion; Attendance: 33,000; Referee: Björn Kuipers

22 January 2017 19	PSV	4–3	Heerenveen	Eindhoven
16:45	Pröpper 32'; Pereiro 40'; Van Ginkel 89', (yellow card) 90+3'; Moreno 90', (yellow card) 35'; Guardado (yellow card) 20'	Report	Ghoochannejhad 5', 54', 80'; St. Juste (yellow card) 44'	Stadium: Philips Stadion; Attendance: 33,900; Referee: Bas Nijhuis

28 January 2017 20	Heracles Almelo	1–2	PSV	Almelo
19:45	Armenteros 74'; Te Wierik (yellow card) 51'; Bruns (yellow card) 77'	Report	Ramselaar 50'; Pröpper 87'	Stadium: Polman Stadion; Attendance: 11,245; Referee: Kevin Blom

4 February 2017 21	AZ	2–4	PSV	Alkmaar
19:45	Friday 17', 85'; Wuytens (yellow card) 53' (red card) 71'; Luckassen (yellow card) 54'	Report	Willems 13', 16'; Pereiro 41' (yellow card) 50'; L. de Jong 80'; Ramselaar (yellow card) 21'; Arias (yellow card) 61'; Van Ginkel (yellow card) 65'; Pröpper (yellow card) 84'	Stadium: AFAS Stadion; Attendance: 16,079; Referee: Serdar Gözübüyük

12 February 2017 22	PSV	3–0	Utrecht	Eindhoven
16:45	L. de Jong 52'; Bergwijn 55'; Van Ginkel 90+3'; Brenet (yellow card) 68'	Report	Ayoub (yellow card) 51'; Labyad (yellow card) 87'	Stadium: Philips Stadion; Attendance: 33,400; Referee: Dennis Higler

18 February 2017 23	PSV	3–1	NEC	Eindhoven
19:45	Van Ginkel 20' (pen.) (yellow card) 22'; Ramselaar 55'; L. de Jong 90+3'	Report	Messaoud 30'; Bikel (yellow card) 20'	Stadium: Philips Stadion; Attendance: 33,500; Referee: Jochem Kamphuis

26 February 2017 24	Feyenoord	2–1	PSV	Rotterdam
14:30	Toornstra 9'; Zoet 82' (o.g.)	Report	Pereiro 62'; L. de Jong (yellow card) 45+2'; Moreno (yellow card) 83'	Stadium: De Kuip; Attendance: 47,500; Referee: Bas Nijhuis

4 March 2017 25	PSV	4–0	Roda JC	Eindhoven
19:45	Moreno 26', 62'; S. de Jong 32', 71' (pen.)	Report	Van Hyfte (yellow card) 49'; Ananou (yellow card) 71'	Stadium: Philips Stadion; Attendance: 34,000; Referee: Ed Janssen

11 March 2017 26	Go Ahead Eagles	1–3	PSV	Deventer
19:45	Manu 48', (yellow card) 70'; Crowley (yellow card) 45+2'; Duits (yellow card) 47'	Report	S. de Jong 40' (pen.); L. de Jong 61', (yellow card) 34'; Guardado 85'	Stadium: Adelaarshorst; Attendance: 9,752; Referee: Kevin Blom

19 March 2017 27	PSV	1–0	Vitesse	Eindhoven
19:45	S. de Jong 50'	Report	Diks (yellow card) 40'; Miazga (yellow card) 72'; Büttner (yellow card) 83'	Stadium: Philips Stadion; Attendance: 33,900; Referee: Björn Kuipers

1 April 2017 28	Sparta Rotterdam	0–2	PSV	Rotterdam
19:45		Report	Locadia 21'; Van Ginkel 42'	Stadium: Sparta-Stadion Het Kasteel; Attendance: 10,000; Referee: Danny Makkelie

6 April 2017 29	Twente	2–2	PSV	Enschede
20:45	Ünal 7'; Celina 90+2'; Klich (yellow card) 66'	Report	Locadia 17'; Moreno 51', (yellow card) 9'	Stadium: De Grolsch Veste; Attendance: 25,300; Referee: Serdar Gözübüyük

9 April 2017 30	PSV	5–0	Willem II	Eindhoven
16:45	Isimat-Mirin 45+2' (yellow card) 48'; Van Ginkel 56', 84'; Pereiro 76'; Guardado 82'	Report		Stadium: Philips Stadion; Attendance: 34,800; Referee: Pol van Boekel

15 April 2017 31	ADO Den Haag	1–1	PSV	The Hague
19:45	Havenaar 87'; Meißner (yellow card) 80'	Report	Pröpper 7'; Pereiro (yellow card) 55'	Stadium: Kyocera Stadion; Attendance: 13,094; Referee: Bas Nijhuis

23 April 2017 32	PSV	1–0	Ajax	Eindhoven
16:45	Locadia 25', (yellow card) 87'; Van Ginkel (yellow card) 38'; Moreno (yellow card) 41'; Pereiro (yellow card) 90+4'	Report	Traoré (yellow card) 43'; Veltman (yellow card) 77'; Kluivert (yellow card) 87'	Stadium: Philips Stadion; Attendance: 35,000; Referee: Kevin Blom

7 May 2017 33	Groningen	1–1	PSV	Groningen
14:30	Mahi 11'; Hiariej (yellow card) 45+4'; Jenssen (yellow card) 58'	Report	Lammers 59'; Moreno (yellow card) 20'	Stadium: Euroborg; Attendance: 20,791; Referee: Dennis Higler

14 May 2017 34	PSV	4–1	PEC Zwolle	Eindhoven
14:30	Moreno 78'; Arias 79'; Lammers 85'; Ramselaar 88'	Report	Van de Pavert 29'	Stadium: Philips Stadion; Attendance: 33,800; Referee: Jeroen Manschot

=== KNVB Cup ===
21 September 2016 1	PSV	4–0	Roda JC	Eindhoven
18:30	Pröpper 25', 60'; Pereiro 34'; Narsingh 77'	Report	Brouwers (yellow card) 4'; Noor (yellow card) 52'; Werker (yellow card) 69'	Stadium: Philips Stadion; Referee: Richard Liesveld

25 October 2016 2	Sparta Rotterdam	3–1	PSV	Rotterdam
20:45	Vriends 15'; El Azzouzi 53'; Brogno 70'	Report	Ramselaar 51'	Stadium: Het Kasteel; Attendance: 10,525; Referee: Danny Makkelie

=== UEFA Champions League ===
==== Group stage ====
Pos	Team	Pld	W	D	L	GF	GA	GD	Pts	Qualification	ATM	BAY	RST	PSV
1	(Spain) Atlético Madrid	6	5	0	1	7	2	+5	15	Advance to knockout phase	—	1–0	2–1	2–0
2	(Germany) Bayern Munich	6	4	0	2	14	6	+8	12	Advance to knockout phase	1–0	—	5–0	4–1
3	(Russia) Rostov	6	1	2	3	6	12	−6	5	Transfer to Europa League	0–1	3–2	—	2–2
4	(Netherlands) PSV Eindhoven	6	0	2	4	4	11	−7	2		0–1	1–2	0–0	—

Source: UEFA
Rules for classification: Group stage tiebreakers

13 September 2016 1	PSV	0–1	Atlético Madrid	Eindhoven
20:45	Moreno (yellow card) 21'; L. de Jong (yellow card) 43'	Report	Saúl 43'; Gabi (yellow card) 30'; Giménez (yellow card) 45+1'	Stadium: Philips Stadion; Attendance: 33,989; Referee: Martin Atkinson

28 September 2016 2	Rostov	2–2	PSV	Rostov-on-Don
20:45	Poloz 8', 37'; Terentyev (yellow card) 39'; Navas (yellow card) 57'	Report	Pröpper 14'; L. de Jong 45+2'; Guardado (yellow card) 53'; Hendrix (yellow card) 57'	Stadium: Olimp-2; Attendance: 12,646; Referee: Clément Turpin

19 October 2016 3	Bayern Munich	4–1	PSV	Munich
20:45	Müller 13'; Kimmich 21'; Lewandowski 59'; Robben 84'; Lahm (yellow card) 57'	Report	Narsingh 41'	Stadium: Allianz Arena; Attendance: 70,000; Referee: Willie Collum

1 November 2016 4	PSV	1–2	Bayern Munich	Eindhoven
20:45	Arias 14'	Report	Lewandowski 34' (pen.), 73'	Stadium: Philips Stadion; Attendance: 35,000; Referee: Gianluca Rocchi

23 November 2016 5	Atlético Madrid	2–0	PSV	Madrid
20:45	Gameiro 55'; Griezmann 66'	Report		Stadium: Vicente Calderón Stadium; Attendance: 37,891; Referee: Aleksei Kulbakov

6 December 2016 6	PSV	0–0	Rostov	Eindhoven
20:45	Bergwijn (yellow card) 63'; Moreno (yellow card) 87'	Report	Granat (yellow card) 40'	Stadium: Philips Stadion; Attendance: 33,400; Referee: Deniz Aytekin

== Statistics ==
=== Appearances and goals ===
No.	Pos	Nat	Player	Total		ERE		UCL		KNVB Cup		Super Cup	
No.	Pos	Nat	Player	Apps	Goals	Apps	Goals	Apps	Goals	Apps	Goals	Apps	Goals
1	GK	(Netherlands) NED	Jeroen Zoet	37	0	31	0	5	0	0	0	1	0
2	DF	(France) FRA	Nicolas Isimat-Mirin	37	2	28	2	6	0	2	0	1	0
3	DF	(Mexico) MEX	Héctor Moreno	39	7	32	7	6	0	1	0	0	0
4	DF	(Colombia) COL	Santiago Arias	34	2	28	1	4	1	2	0	0	0
5	DF	(Germany) GER	Daniel Schwaab	30	0	23	0	5	0	1	0	1	0
6	MF	(Netherlands) NED	Davy Pröpper	43	10	34	6	6	1	2	2	1	1
7	MF	(Uruguay) URU	Gastón Pereiro	38	11	30	10	5	0	2	1	1	0
8	MF	(Netherlands) NED	Jorrit Hendrix	23	1	19	1	2	0	1	0	1	0
9	FW	(Netherlands) NED	Luuk de Jong	39	8	32	8	5	0	1	0	1	0
10	MF	(Netherlands) NED	Siem de Jong	23	6	19	6	3	0	1	0	0	0
11	FW	(Netherlands) NED	Luciano Narsingh	23	3	15	1	5	1	2	1	1	0
14	DF	(Denmark) DEN	Simon Poulsen	0	0	0	0	0	0	0	0	0	0
15	DF	(Netherlands) NED	Jetro Willems	32	2	25	2	5	0	1	0	1	0
17	FW	(Netherlands) NED	Florian Jozefzoon	5	0	5	0	0	0	0	0	0	0
18	MF	(Mexico) MEX	Andrés Guardado	33	2	27	2	4	0	1	0	1	0
19	FW	(Netherlands) NED	Jürgen Locadia	15	3	14	3	0	0	0	0	1	0
20	DF	(Netherlands) NED	Joshua Brenet	26	1	20	1	4	0	1	0	1	0
21	GK	(Netherlands) NED	Luuk Koopmans	0	0	0	0	0	0	0	0	0	0
22	GK	(Netherlands) NED	Remko Pasveer	6	0	3	0	1	0	2	0	0	0
23	MF	(Netherlands) NED	Bart Ramselaar	33	6	27	5	4	0	2	1	0	0
25	MF	(Ukraine) UKR	Oleksandr Zinchenko	17	0	12	0	4	0	1	0	0	0
27	FW	(Netherlands) NED	Steven Bergwijn	34	2	25	2	6	0	2	0	1	0
28	MF	(Netherlands) NED	Marco van Ginkel	15	7	15	7	0	0	0	0	0	0
29	DF	(Netherlands) NED	Menno Koch	0	0	0	0	0	0	0	0	0	0
30	DF	(Netherlands) NED	Jordy de Wijs	1	0	0	0	1	0	0	0	0	0
31	GK	(Netherlands) NED	Hidde Jurjus	0	0	0	0	0	0	0	0	0	0
38	MF	(Sweden) SWE	Ramon Pascal Lundqvist	4	0	2	0	1	0	1	0	0	0
50	FW	(Netherlands) NED	Sam Lammers	7	2	5	2	0	0	2	0	0	0

=== Disciplinary record ===
No.	Nat.	Name	Eredivisie			Champions League			KNVB Cup			Johan Cruyff Shield			Total		
No.	Nat.	Name	Yellow card	(yellow card) (yellow-red card)	Red card	Yellow card	(yellow card) (yellow-red card)	Red card	Yellow card	(yellow card) (yellow-red card)	Red card	Yellow card	(yellow card) (yellow-red card)	Red card	Yellow card	(yellow card) (yellow-red card)	Red card
1	(Netherlands)	Jeroen Zoet	1	0	0	0	0	0	0	0	0	0	0	0	1	0	0
2	(France)	Nicolas Isimat-Mirin	2	0	0	0	0	0	0	0	0	1	0	0	3	0	0
3	(Mexico)	Héctor Moreno	7	0	0	2	0	0	0	0	0	0	0	0	8	0	0
4	(Colombia)	Santiago Arias	3	0	0	0	0	0	0	0	0	0	0	0	3	0	0
5	(Germany)	Daniel Schwaab	1	0	0	0	0	0	0	0	0	0	0	0	1	0	0
6	(Netherlands)	Davy Pröpper	2	0	0	0	0	0	0	0	0	0	0	0	2	0	0
7	(Uruguay)	Gastón Pereiro	4	0	0	0	0	0	0	0	0	0	0	0	4	0	0
8	(Netherlands)	Jorrit Hendrix	0	0	0	1	0	0	0	0	0	0	0	0	1	0	0
9	(Netherlands)	Luuk de Jong	4	0	0	1	0	0	0	0	0	0	0	0	5	0	0
11	(Netherlands)	Luciano Narsingh	1	0	0	0	0	0	0	0	0	0	0	0	1	0	0
15	(Netherlands)	Jetro Willems	2	0	0	0	0	0	0	0	0	1	0	0	3	0	0
18	(Mexico)	Andrés Guardado	2	0	0	1	0	0	0	0	0	0	0	0	3	0	0
19	(Netherlands)	Jürgen Locadia	2	0	0	0	0	0	0	0	0	0	0	0	2	0	0
20	(Netherlands)	Joshua Brenet	1	0	0	0	0	0	0	0	0	0	0	0	1	0	0
23	(Netherlands)	Bart Ramselaar	2	0	0	0	0	0	0	0	0	0	0	0	2	0	0
27	(Netherlands)	Steven Bergwijn	0	0	0	1	0	0	0	0	0	0	0	0	1	0	0
28	(Netherlands)	Marco van Ginkel	4	0	0	0	0	0	0	0	0	0	0	0	4	0	0
Total			37	0	0	6	0	0	0	0	0	2	0	0	45	0	0

== Transfers ==
=== Transfers in ===
First Team
Date from	Position	Nationality	Name	From	Fee	Ref.
11 July 2016	CB	(Germany)	Daniel Schwaab	(Germany) VfB Stuttgart	Free	
15 July 2016	GK	(Netherlands)	Hidde Jurjus	(Netherlands) De Graafschap	Undisclosed	
18 August 2016	MF	(Netherlands)	Bart Ramselaar	(Netherlands) Utrecht	Undisclosed	

=== Transfers out ===
First Team
Date from	Position	Nationality	Name	To	Fee	Ref.
26 June 2016	CB	(Netherlands)	Jeffrey Bruma	(Germany) VfL Wolfsburg	Undisclosed	
25 July 2016	CM	(Netherlands)	Stijn Schaars	(Netherlands) Heerenveen	Free	
12 January 2017	RW	(Netherlands)	Luciano Narsingh	(England) Swansea City	€4,600,000	
27 January 2017	RW	(Netherlands)	Florian Jozefzoon	(England) Brentford		
31 January 2017	LB	(Denmark)	Simon Poulsen	(Denmark) SønderjyskE	Free	

=== Loans in ===
First Team
Date from	Position	Nationality	Name	From	Fee	Ref.
22 August 2016	MF	(Netherlands)	Siem de Jong	(England) Newcastle United	On loan	
26 August 2016	MF	(Ukraine)	Oleksandr Zinchenko	(England) Manchester City	On loan	
2 January 2017	MF	(Netherlands)	Marco van Ginkel	(England) Chelsea	On loan	

=== Loans out ===
First Team
Date from	Position	Nationality	Name	To	Fee	Ref.
15 August 2016	CB	(Netherlands)	Menno Koch	(Netherlands) Utrecht	On loan	
20 August 2016	MF	(Austria)	Marcel Ritzmaier	(Netherlands) Go Ahead Eagles	On loan	
30 August 2016	MF	(Netherlands)	Rai Vloet	(Netherlands) FC Eindhoven	On loan	
31 August 2016	MF	(Netherlands)	Adam Maher	(Turkey) Osmanlıspor	On loan	
15 January 2017	CB	(Netherlands)	Jordy de Wijs	(Netherlands) Excelsior	On loan	
