= Marco van Ginkel =

Dutch footballer (born 1992)

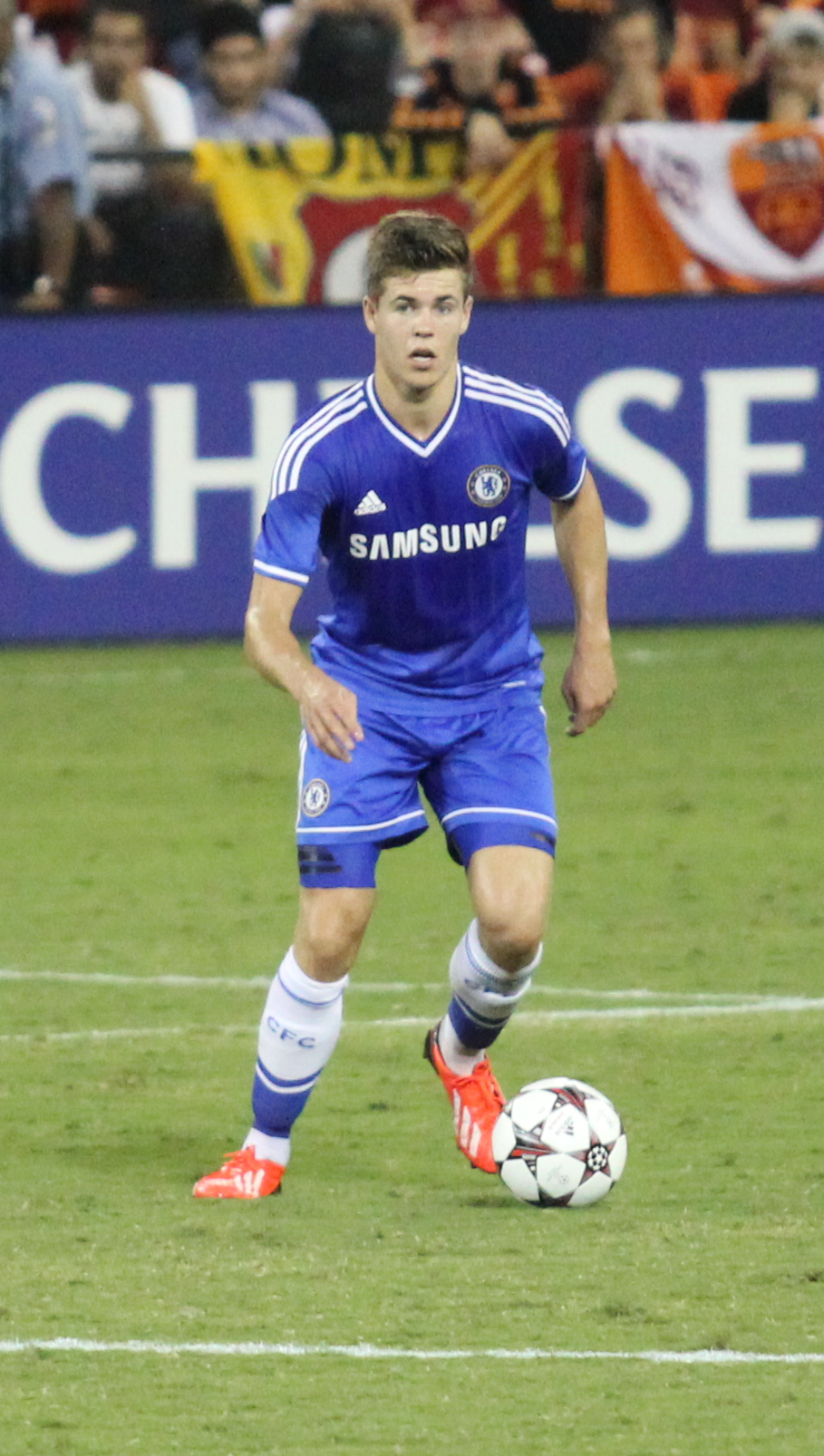
- Van Ginkel playing for Chelsea in 2013

Personal information
- Full name: Marco Wulfert Cornelis van Ginkel
- Date of birth: 1 December 1992 (age 33)
- Place of birth: Amersfoort, Netherlands
- Height: 1.80 m (5 ft 11 in)
- Position: Midfielder

Youth career
- 1999–2010: Vitesse

Senior career*
Years	Team	Apps	(Gls)
2010–2013	Vitesse	93	(18)
2013–2021	Chelsea	2	(0)
2014–2015	→ AC Milan (loan)	17	(1)
2015–2016	→ Stoke City (loan)	17	(0)
2016–2018	→ PSV (loan)	56	(29)
2020–2021	→ PSV (loan)	11	(1)
2021–2023	PSV	24	(1)
2023–2024	Vitesse	43	(9)
2025	Boavista	11	(1)
Total		274	(60)

International career
2006–2007	Netherlands U15	4	(0)
2010–2011	Netherlands U19	4	(0)
2011–2014	Netherlands U21	23	(4)
2012–2017	Netherlands	8	(0)
- * Club domestic league appearances and goals

Marco Wulfert Cornelis van Ginkel (Dutch pronunciation: [ˈmɑrkoː vɑŋ ˈɣɪŋkəl]; (Note: Van in isolation: [vɑn].) born 1 December 1992) is a Dutch former professional footballer who played as a defensive or attacking midfielder.

Van Ginkel began his career in the youth ranks of Vitesse, joining the Arnhem-based club as a six-year-old in 1999. After making his way through the various youth levels at the club, Van Ginkel debuted for the senior team in 2010 before sealing a transfer around £9 million to Chelsea in 2013. He suffered a serious knee injury early into his Chelsea career which ruled him out for seven months. He then went on season-long loans to AC Milan in 2014–15, Stoke City in 2015–16 and PSV from 2016 until 2018 until joining Vitesse.

At international level, Van Ginkel represented the Netherlands at the under-19 and under-21 levels before making his senior team debut against Germany in November 2012.

== Club career ==
=== Vitesse ===
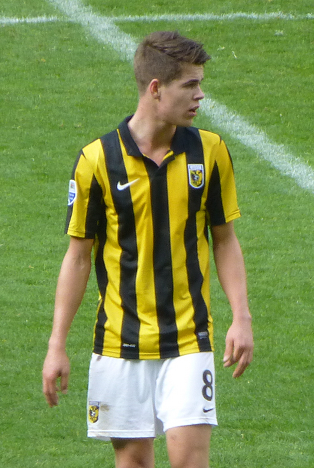
Van Ginkel playing for Vitesse in 2012

Van Ginkel made his debut for Vitesse on 9 April 2010, replacing Nicky Hofs in the 67th minute as the club fell to a 4–1 defeat to RKC Waalwijk in Eredivisie action. He was just seventeen at the time of his senior club debut. His first senior goal for the club came in his first appearance of the 2010–11 Eredivisie campaign, netting in the 43rd minute to bring the game to 2–2 before two second-half goals sent Ajax to a 4–2 win. Van Ginkel scored Vitesse's second and fifth goals in a 5–2 defeat of Roda JC on 29 January 2011.

In the KNVB Cup on 19 December 2012, Van Ginkel scored Vitesse's second goal in a memorable 10–1 win over third division side ADO '20. On 23 February 2013, Van Ginkel notched a brace and Wilfried Bony netted a hat-trick as Vitesse defeated Heracles in a 5–3 win. After a stellar campaign that saw Van Ginkel net eight Eredivisie goals and Vitesse finish in fourth, the club's highest position since finishing in third in 1998, he was voted as the Dutch Talent of the Year awarding his play as the best footballer in the league under 21. Upon his prospected moved to Chelsea, he was regarded as being the next Frank Lampard by Vitesse manager Peter Bosz.

=== Chelsea ===
On 3 July 2013, English Premier League club Chelsea announced that they had reached an agreement with Vitesse for the transfer of Van Ginkel. With the fee reported to be in the region of £8 million. On 5 July, Chelsea confirmed that they had completed the signing of Van Ginkel, with the Dutch international midfielder signing a five-year contract with the club. Speaking to the official Chelsea website upon his signing with the club, Van Ginkel described himself as "a box-to-box player" who "covers a lot of metres and can score a goal".

==== 2013–14 season ====
On the opening day of the 2013–14 season, Van Ginkel made his competitive debut for Chelsea as a substitute against Hull City. On 18 September 2013, he played his first UEFA Champions League game in a 2–1 home defeat by Basel. On 24 September, in a League Cup match against Swindon Town, Van Ginkel suffered an anterior cruciate ligament (ACL) injury that kept him out of play for around seven months.

Van Ginkel made his competitive return to football in Chelsea's under-21s' match away to Manchester United on 21 March 2014.

==== Loan to AC Milan ====
On 1 September 2014, AC Milan announced that Van Ginkel had joined the Serie A club on loan from Chelsea for the 2014–15 season. During his loan spell, Van Ginkel wore the number 21 jersey, formerly owned by some of the great names of the club such as Andrea Pirlo and Mauro Tassotti.

Van Ginkel made his first appearance for Milan on the bench against Parma on 14 September 2014, but he did not make his debut until 23 September. On 23 September, he made his first start, as well as his debut, for Milan against Empoli. His debut, however, was cut short as he was taken off on a stretcher in the 34th minute after suffering an ankle injury.

Following his injury, Van Ginkel made his way back on the bench on 19 October, as Milan faced Hellas Verona, but was an unused substitute. Van Ginkel would continue to be left on the bench without a single minute of game time, leading his agent, Karl Jansen, to speak out: "We aren't happy about that is clear. It [leaving Van Ginkel out] went against all logic. Marco didn't have to go to Italy, if he wasn't going to be used anyway. Milan agreed with that. A fit and in-form Van Ginkel plays his way into Milan's starting XI." After Jasen speaking out for Van Ginkel, rumors started around about the possibly of Van Ginkel returning to Chelsea, or going on loan for another team.

On 30 November, Van Ginkel was finally deemed fit enough to start for Milan in a match against Udinese. He played nearly the entire game, being substituted off for Riccardo Montolivo in the 89th minute in a 2–0 Milan victory. In the following game, on 7 December, Van Ginkel was again left on the bench as an unused substitute as Milan crashed into a 1–0 defeat against Genoa.

Van Ginkel took a turn for the worse as he picked up an ankle injury during practice caused by teammate Sulley Muntari. The tackle from Muntari was described as "hard challenge, but it was not a violent challenge" by head coach Filippo Inzaghi; with the injury, Van Ginkel was ruled out for two months.

Van Ginkel made his return to the bench on 18 January 2015, but it was not until 24 January that Van Ginkel made his return onto the pitch, playing against Lazio; he was substituted off in the 55th minute. Van Ginkel played every minute in the league since 4 April, and on 9 May, he scored the opener in a 2–1 home victory over Roma.

==== Loan to Stoke City ====
On 10 July 2015, Van Ginkel joined Stoke City on loan for the 2015–16 season as part of a deal that saw goalkeeper Asmir Begović move to Chelsea for £8 million. Van Ginkel made his debut for Stoke on 9 August in a 1–0 defeat against Liverpool. After starting the first six matches of the season his place in midfield was taken by Ibrahim Afellay. Following the arrival of Giannelli Imbula on 1 February 2016, Stoke cancelled Van Ginkel's loan.

==== Loans to PSV ====
Following Stoke's decision to cancel Van Ginkel's loan, he joined PSV on loan for the remainder of the season and reuniting him with former Vitesse teammate Davy Pröpper. Van Ginkel was given the number 28 jersey upon arrival. He made his PSV debut against Utrecht in the quarter-finals of the KNVB Cup, which ended in a 3–1 loss for PSV. He made his league debut on 7 February against Utrecht, three days after PSV's loss in the KNVB Cup. In his league debut, Van Ginkel scored his first goal for PSV as they won 2–0. In the following match, Van Ginkel scored the third goal in a 3–0 win over NEC. On 2 April, Van Ginkel scored a brace against AZ which ended in a 4–2 victory. On 1 May, he scored another brace in a 6–2 win over Cambuur. He won the Eredivisie title with PSV, playing a crucial part for the team by scoring eight goals during his spell.

Although there was talk of a return to PSV on another loan in the summer, Van Ginkel confirmed that he would not be leaving the London side due to a knee injury. After his recovery at Chelsea, however, Van Ginkel signed a new three-year contract on 31 December 2016 and rejoined PSV for a second loan spell.

On 16 July 2017, Van Ginkel's loan spell at PSV was extended for the 2017–18 campaign. Despite his age and being a loanee, Van Ginkel replaced Luuk de Jong as captain.

On 15 April 2018, he played the full 90 minutes as PSV beat rivals Ajax 3–0 to clinch the 2017–18 Eredivisie title. Three months later, Van Ginkel underwent surgery to reconstruct his anterior cruciate ligament and treat damage in his knee, and was expected to be out for around eight months.

==== Return to Chelsea ====
After his loan ended with PSV and he returned to Chelsea, Van Ginkel remained out of action for the following two seasons. On 26 June 2020, Van Ginkel signed a new one-year deal with Chelsea despite just four appearances for the first-team in seven years.

=== PSV ===
On 6 October 2020, Van Ginkel returned to the Netherlands with PSV until the end of the 2020–21 season. This was his third spell with the club, having previously won two Eredivisie titles in 2016 and 2018, the second one of those as captain. He made his move to PSV permanent on 18 June 2021.

=== Return to Vitesse ===
On 31 January 2023, Van Ginkel returned to his boyhood club Vitesse for an undisclosed fee, signing a contract until June 2024 with the Arnhem-based team.

=== Boavista ===
On 12 February 2025, Van Ginkel was one of 9 players Boavista signed on free transfers, a day after FIFA lifted a transfer ban that had prevented the club from making signings in each of the past five transfer windows. He signed a deal that would run until the end of the season. On 14 February 2025, he made his debut for Boavista, coming on as a substitute in a 1–0 loss against Estrela Amadora.

== International career ==
Van Ginkel made his senior debut with the Netherlands national team against Germany on 14 November 2012, coming on as a late substitute in their 0–0 friendly at the Amsterdam Arena. In May 2013, Van Ginkel was included in the Netherlands squad for the UEFA U21 Championship in Israel. After being absent from the senior team for four years, Van Ginkel was recalled to the squad for a friendly against England on 29 March 2016, where he came on as a substitute as the Netherlands would go on to win 2–1 at Wembley Stadium.

== Style of play ==
Van Ginkel primarily played as a central midfielder, but was also played in a multitude of positions including defensive midfield and across the attacking midfield. From his early playing days at Vitesse, he primarily played in an attacking role, though he was used to play in a defensive role. Van Ginkel was recognized as a well-rounded player. On the pitch he was known for his ball control and passing. He was comfortable with both feet, runs into the box, and long-range shot.

== Career statistics ==
=== Club ===
Appearances and goals by club, season and competition
Club	Season	League			National cup (Note: Includes KNVB Cup, FA Cup, Coppa Italia)		League cup (Note: Includes Football League Cup)		Europe		Other		Total	
Club	Season	Division	Apps	Goals	Apps	Goals	Apps	Goals	Apps	Goals	Apps	Goals	Apps	Goals
Vitesse	2009–10	Eredivisie	4	0	0	0	—		—		—		4	0
Vitesse	2010–11	Eredivisie	26	5	2	0	—		—		—		28	5
Vitesse	2011–12	Eredivisie	30	5	4	1	—		4 (Note: Appearances in Eredivisie European play-offs)	0	—		38	6
Vitesse	2012–13	Eredivisie	33	8	4	1	—		4 (Note: Appearance(s) in UEFA Europa League)	3	—		41	12
Vitesse	Total		93	18	10	2	0	0	8	3	0	0	111	23
Chelsea	2013–14	Premier League	2	0	0	0	1	0	1 (Note: Appearance(s) in UEFA Champions League)	0	—		4	0
Chelsea	2018–19	Premier League	0	0	0	0	0	0	0	0	—		0	0
Chelsea	2019–20	Premier League	0	0	0	0	0	0	0	0	—		0	0
Chelsea	2020–21	Premier League	0	0	0	0	0	0	0	0	—		0	0
Chelsea	Total		2	0	0	0	1	0	1	0	0	0	4	0
AC Milan (loan)	2014–15	Serie A	17	1	1	0	—		0	0	—		18	1
Stoke City (loan)	2015–16	Premier League	17	0	2	0	2	0	—		—		21	0
PSV (loan)	2015–16	Eredivisie	13	8	1	0	—		2	0	—		16	8
PSV (loan)	2016–17	Eredivisie	15	7	0	0	—		0	0	—		15	7
PSV (loan)	2017–18	Eredivisie	28	14	3	2	—		2	0	—		33	16
PSV (loan)	2020–21	Eredivisie	11	1	0	0	—		1	0	—		12	1
PSV	2021–22	Eredivisie	23	1	3	0	—		11 (Note: Six appearances and one goal in UEFA Champions League, four appearances in UEFA Europa League, one appearance in UEFA Europa Conference League)	1	1 (Note: Appearance in Johan Cruyff Shield)	0	38	2
PSV	2022–23	Eredivisie	1	0	0	0	—		3	0	—		4	0
PSV	PSV total		91	31	7	2	—		19	1	1	0	118	34
Vitesse	2022–23	Eredivisie	13	2	0	0	—		—		—		13	2
Vitesse	2023–24	Eredivisie	30	7	2	0	—		—		—		32	7
Vitesse	Total		43	9	2	0	—		—		—		45	9
Boavista	2024–25	Primeira Liga	11	1	—		—		—		—		11	1
Career total			274	60	22	4	3	0	28	4	1	0	328	68

=== International ===
Appearances and goals by national team and year
National team	Year	Apps	Goals
Netherlands	2012	1	0
Netherlands	2013	1	0
Netherlands	2016	4	0
Netherlands	2017	2	0
Total		8	0

== Honours ==
PSV

- Eredivisie: 2015–16, 2017–18
- KNVB Cup: 2021–22
- Johan Cruyff Shield: 2021, 2022

Individual

- Johan Cruyff Trophy: 2012–13
