= Davy Pröpper =

Dutch footballer (born 1991)

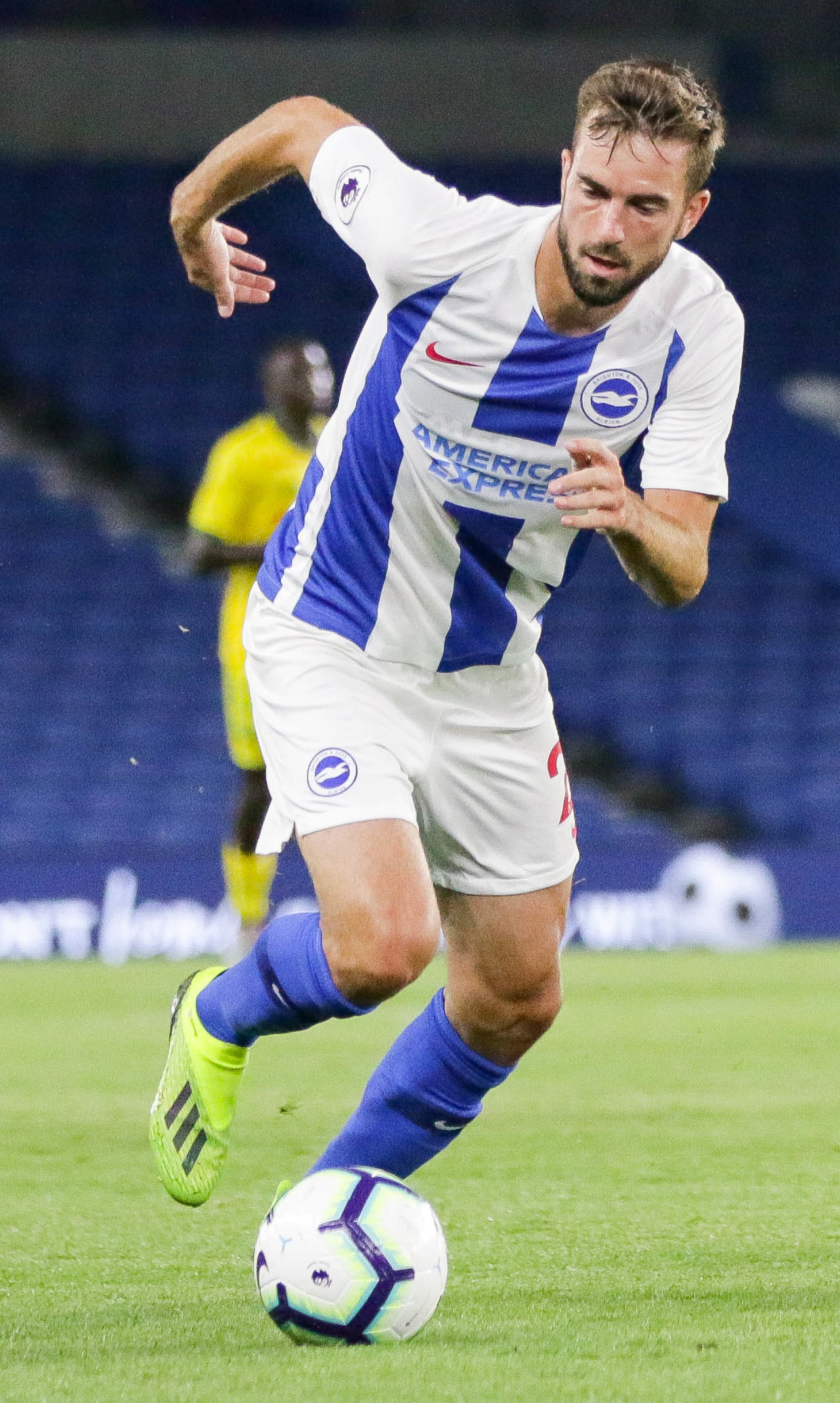
- Pröpper playing for Brighton & Hove Albion in 2018

Personal information
- Full name: David Petrus Wenceslaus Henri Pröpper
- Date of birth: 2 September 1991 (age 35)
- Place of birth: Arnhem, Netherlands
- Height: 1.85 m (6 ft 1 in)
- Positions: Central midfielder; attacking midfielder

Youth career
- 2002–2004: VDZ
- 2004–2008: Vitesse

Senior career*
Years	Team	Apps	(Gls)
2008–2015	Vitesse	142	(18)
2015–2017	PSV	67	(16)
2017–2021	Brighton & Hove Albion	107	(2)
2021–2022	PSV	9	(1)
2023–2024	Vitesse	4	(0)
Total		329	(37)

International career
2009–2010	Netherlands U19	4	(0)
2010–2013	Netherlands U21	5	(1)
2015–2019	Netherlands	19	(3)
Medal record
Men's football
Representing Netherlands
UEFA Nations League
Silver medal – second place	2019 Portugal
- * Club domestic league appearances and goals

David Petrus Wenceslaus Henri Pröpper (born 2 September 1991) is a Dutch former professional footballer who played as a central or attacking midfielder.

== Early and personal life ==
Pröpper was born in Arnhem and his brothers Robin and Mike are footballers.

== Club career ==
=== Vitesse ===
Pröpper started his career with local amateur club VDZ, where he was coached by his father, Peter, before progressing through Vitesse's academy. He made his Eredivisie debut on 17 January 2010 in a match against NEC at Stadion de Goffert, coming on as a substitute for Kevin van Diermen in the 84th minute. He made his first appearance in the starting line-up on 13 April 2010, in a match against NAC Breda at the GelreDome. Pröpper made 11 appearances in the Eredivisie in the 2009–10 season.

In his second season at Vitesse he scored his first goal for the club, opening an eventual 4–2 defeat to Ajax.

=== PSV ===
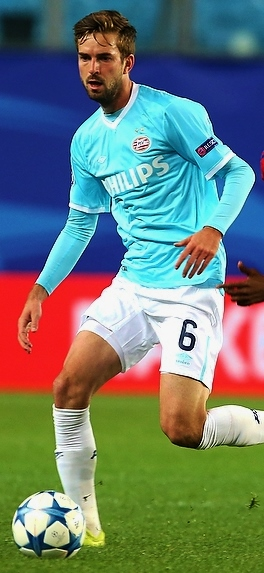
Pröpper playing for PSV in 2015

On 8 December 2015, Pröpper scored the winning goal for PSV at home against CSKA Moscow in the UEFA Champions League, ensuring a spot in the last 16 for PSV for the first time in nine years. Pröpper played in every league match but one, scoring 10 goals in the 2015–16 title winning season, successfully defending their title from the year prior.

=== Brighton & Hove Albion ===
Pröpper signed for newly promoted Premier League club Brighton & Hove Albion on 7 August 2017 on a four-year contract, for a club-record transfer fee. 5 days later he made his debut, playing the full match in Brighton's first ever Premier League fixture. Brighton went on to lose 2–0 at home to eventual league champions, Manchester City. He made his EFL Cup debut on 19 September coming on as a substitute in the 1–0 away loss at Bournemouth. Pröpper again played the whole match at home to West Brom on 9 September where Brighton won 3–1, recording their first Premier League win. Pröpper made four appearances in the 2017–18 FA Cup including the 2–0 quarter final defeat away to Manchester United. On 7 April 2018, Pröpper was shown a straight red card for a late challenge on Jonathan Hogg in a 1–1 home draw against Huddersfield Town. On 4 May, Brighton were to face Manchester United again, this time in the league where Brighton won 1–0 at Falmer Stadium securing Premier League status. Pröpper played the entire match.

Early in his second season at The Albion he featured in the consecutive victory over Manchester United, claiming a 3–2 home win on 19 August 2018. He played in what was Brighton's only EFL Cup match of the season on 28 August coming on as a substitute in the 1–0 home loss to South Coast rivals, Southampton. Pröpper scored his first goal for Brighton in a 2–1 league defeat away against Leicester on 26 February 2019. Like the season prior, Pröpper made 4 appearances in the 2018–19 FA Cup where they went one step further, being knocked out in the Semi-final at Wembley Stadium against Manchester City in which Pröpper played in. Pröpper was again a regular in the squad for the Sussex club where their safety was secured on 4 May as a result of Cardiff City losing at home to Brighton's rivals, Crystal Palace. This confirmation came exactly a year after Brighton secured their safety in the 2017–18 season.

On the opening day of the 2019–20 season, Pröpper set up Florin Andone's goal in a match where Brighton recorded their joint biggest away victory in the Premier League, beating Watford 3–0.

Pröpper had an injury hit 2020–21 season with The Albion and was restricted to only 7 Premier League appearances, playing in 11 matches in all competitions all season.

=== Return to PSV ===
On 23 June 2021, PSV announced that they had re-signed Pröpper from Brighton for an undisclosed fee. He made his second debut for PSV on 21 July, coming on as a 63rd-minute substitute for Marco van Ginkel in an eventual 5–1 home win over Galatasaray in the first leg of the second qualifying round in the Champions League. He came on as a 61st-minute substitute for Ibrahim Sangaré in the 2021 Johan Cruyff Shield in which PSV came away with their 12th title after thrashing Ajax 4–0 at the Johan Cruyff Arena on 7 August. His league return with PSV came with success playing the whole match of the 2–0 away win over Heracles Almelo on 14 August in the opening game of the season. He scored his first goal on his return to PSV seven days later, opening the scoring in the 4–1 home victory over SC Cambuur.

On 4 January 2022, Pröpper announced his retirement from professional football, citing a lack of motivation and a discomfort with the current football culture.

=== Comeback and return to Vitesse ===
On 27 January 2023, Pröpper returned to playing and signed a contract with his first club Vitesse until 30 June 2024. On 21 May 2024, he announced his second retirement from professional football after suffering a serious knee injury.

== International career ==
Pröpper has represented the Netherlands U-19 team in the qualification rounds for the 2010 UEFA European Under-19 Championship. On 14 November 2009, Pröpper made his debut for the U-19 Oranje in a qualification match against Cyprus, coming on as a substitute for Steven Berghuis. On 17 November 2009, Pröpper was in the starting line-up and played the whole match in a match against Czech Republic.

He made his senior debut on 5 June 2015, replacing captain Robin van Persie in the 57th minute of an eventual 3–4 friendly defeat to the United States at the Amsterdam Arena. Pröpper scored his first goals for his country on his 6th cap in a 2018 World Cup qualifier on 3 September 2017, netting twice in the 3–1 home victory over Bulgaria. In his next cap he scored again in a 3–1 victory, which was also in a 2018 World Cup qualifier, this time away to Belarus on 7 October 2017.

Pröpper was part of the Dutch 2019 Nations League squad that finished as the runners up. On 6 September, Pröpper came on as a substitute away against Germany in a Euro 2020 qualifier where the Dutch claimed a 4–2 victory.

== Career statistics ==
=== Club ===
Appearances and goals by club, season and competition
Club	Season	League			National cup		League cup		Europe		Other		Total	
Club	Season	Division	Apps	Goals	Apps	Goals	Apps	Goals	Apps	Goals	Apps	Goals	Apps	Goals
Vitesse	2009–10	Eredivisie	11	0	0	0	—		—		—		11	0
Vitesse	2010–11	Eredivisie	29	3	3	1	—		—		—		32	4
Vitesse	2011–12	Eredivisie	19	1	3	0	—		—		—		22	1
Vitesse	2012–13	Eredivisie	14	0	3	2	—		4 (Note: Appearance(s) in UEFA Europa League)	0	—		21	2
Vitesse	2013–14	Eredivisie	35	7	2	0	—		1	0	—		38	7
Vitesse	2014–15	Eredivisie	34	7	4	0	—		—		—		38	7
Vitesse	Total		142	18	15	3	—		5	0	—		162	21
PSV	2015–16	Eredivisie	33	10	2	1	—		8 (Note: Appearances in UEFA Champions League)	1	1 (Note: Appearance in Johan Cruyff Shield)	0	44	12
PSV	2016–17	Eredivisie	34	6	2	2	—		6	1	1	1	43	10
PSV	2017–18	Eredivisie	—		—		—		2	0	—		2	0
PSV	Total		67	16	4	3	—		16	2	2	1	89	22
Brighton & Hove Albion	2017–18	Premier League	35	0	4	0	1	0	—		—		40	0
Brighton & Hove Albion	2018–19	Premier League	30	1	4	0	1	0	—		—		35	1
Brighton & Hove Albion	2019–20	Premier League	35	1	0	0	0	0	—		—		35	1
Brighton & Hove Albion	2020–21	Premier League	7	0	2	0	2	0	—		—		11	0
Brighton & Hove Albion	Total		107	2	10	0	4	0	—		—		121	2
PSV	2021–22	Eredivisie	9	1	0	0	—		6 (Note: Five appearances in UEFA Champions League, one appearance in UEFA Europa League)	0	1	0	16	1
Vitesse	2022–23	Eredivisie	2	0	0	0	—		—		—		2	0
Vitesse	2023–24	Eredivisie	2	0	1	0	—		—		—		3	0
Vitesse	Total		4	0	1	0	—		5	0	—		5	0
Career total			329	37	30	6	4	0	27	2	3	1	393	46

=== International ===
Appearances and goals by national team and year
National team	Year	Apps	Goals
Netherlands	2015	1	0
Netherlands	2016	3	0
Netherlands	2017	4	3
Netherlands	2018	5	0
Netherlands	2019	6	0
Total		19	3

Netherlands score listed first, score column indicates score after each Pröpper goal.

List of international goals scored by Davy Pröpper
No.	Date	Venue	Cap	Opponent	Score	Result	Competition
1	3 September 2017	Amsterdam Arena, Amsterdam, Netherlands	6	Bulgaria	1–0	3–1	2018 FIFA World Cup qualification
2	3 September 2017	Amsterdam Arena, Amsterdam, Netherlands	6	Bulgaria	3–1	3–1	2018 FIFA World Cup qualification
3	7 October 2017	Borisov Arena, Barysaw, Belarus	7	Belarus	1–0	3–1	2018 FIFA World Cup qualification

== Honours ==
PSV

- Eredivisie: 2015–16
- Johan Cruyff Shield: 2015, 2016, 2021

Netherlands

- UEFA Nations League runner-up: 2018–19
