= Gastón Pereiro =

Uruguayan footballer (born 1995)

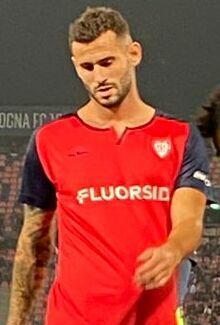
- Pereiro in 2022 with Cagliari

Personal information
- Full name: Gastón Rodrigo Pereiro López
- Date of birth: 11 June 1995 (age 31)
- Place of birth: Montevideo, Uruguay
- Height: 1.88 m (6 ft 2 in)
- Position: Attacking midfielder

Team information
- Current team: Juventud

Youth career
- –2008: Racing Club Montevideo
- 2008–2013: Nacional

Senior career*
Years	Team	Apps	(Gls)
2013–2015	Nacional	39	(11)
2015–2020	PSV	118	(44)
2020–2024	Cagliari	63	(8)
2023	→ Nacional (loan)	18	(2)
2024	→ Ternana (loan)	18	(5)
2024–2025	Genoa	2	(0)
2025–2026	Bari	11	(1)
2026–	Juventud	0	(0)

International career
2012–2015	Uruguay U20	21	(8)
2017–2021	Uruguay	13	(5)
- * Club domestic league appearances and goals as of 17 March 2026

Gastón Rodrigo Pereiro López (born 11 June 1995) is a Uruguayan professional footballer who plays as an attacking midfielder for Uruguayan Primera División club Juventud.

== Club career ==
Pereiro grew from the youth system of Nacional. In April 2012, along with Diego Baldi, Leandro Otormín and Rodrigo Amaral, he traveled to England to participate in a ten-day training session at Liverpool.

On 28 January 2014, he made his official debut for Nacional in a Copa Libertadores match against Oriente Petrolero. Coach Gerardo Pelusso substituted him on in the 63rd minute replacing Carlos de Pena, they lost 1–0. Four days later, he scored his first goal in the 2–0 victory over Racing at the Estadio Centenario.

On 15 July 2015, Eredivisie side PSV Eindhoven confirmed the signing of Pereiro on a five-year deal. He was given the number 7 jersey, previously worn by Memphis Depay, and made his official debut in the Dutch Super Cup 2015, coming on as a substitute for Adam Maher. On 4 October 2015, Pereiro made his first start for PSV Eindhoven, scoring a brace in a 2–1 victory against arch-rival Ajax. Pereiro then scored his first hat-trick for the club on 27 October 2015, in a KNVB Cup fixture against Genemuiden.

He scored the first goal as PSV beat rivals Ajax 3–0 to clinch the 2017–18 Eredivisie title.

On 31 January 2020, he signed a 4.5-year contract with Italian club Cagliari. On 17 January 2023, Pereiro returned to Nacional on loan until the end of the 2022–23 season. On 18 January 2024, Pereiro moved on a new loan to Ternana. On 29 August 2024, his contract with Cagliari was terminated by mutual consent. On 14 October 2024, he joined Genoa as a free agent.

On 1 February 2025, Pereiro signed a one-and-a-half-year contract with Bari in Serie B, with an option to extend. On 20 January 2026, the contract with Bari was mutually terminated.

== International career ==
Pereiro was called by Fabián Coito to play the 2015 South American Youth Football Championship. He played eight matches scoring five goals, helping Uruguay qualify for the 2015 FIFA U-20 World Cup. He was selected for the U-20 World Cup squad and in the first match he scored the winning goal against the final champion, Serbia.

He was called up to the full Uruguay squad in the autumn of 2017. He made his debut in a 0-0 draw against Poland at the Stadion Narodowy in Warsaw on 10 November 2017.

== Career statistics ==
=== Club ===
As of match played 7 November 2024

Club	Season	League			National cup (Note: Includes KNVB Cup, Coppa Italia)		Continental		Other		Total	
Club	Season	Division	Apps	Goals	Apps	Goals	Apps	Goals	Apps	Goals	Apps	Goals
Nacional	2013–14	Primera División	15	5	—		6 (Note: Appearances in Copa Libertadores)	0	—		21	5
Nacional	2014–15	Primera División	24	6	—		1	1	—		25	7
Nacional	Total		39	11	—		7	1	—		46	12
PSV	2015–16	Eredivisie	29	11	3	3	6 (Note: Appearances in UEFA Champions League)	0	1 (Note: Appearance in Johan Cruyff Shield)	0	39	14
PSV	2016–17	Eredivisie	30	10	2	1	5	0	1	0	38	11
PSV	2017–18	Eredivisie	28	11	3	0	2 (Note: Appearances in UEFA Europa League)	0	—		33	11
PSV	2018–19	Eredivisie	27	10	0	0	8	1	1	0	36	11
PSV	2019–20	Eredivisie	4	2	1	0	3	0	0	0	8	2
PSV	Total		118	44	9	4	24	1	3	0	154	49
Cagliari	2019–20	Serie A	10	1	0	0	—		—		10	1
Cagliari	2020–21	Serie A	15	2	1	0	—		—		16	2
Cagliari	2021–22	Serie A	29	4	2	1	—		—		20	5
Cagliari	2022–23	Serie B	9	1	2	0	—		—		11	1
Cagliari	2023–24	Serie A	0	0	2	0	—		—		2	0
Cagliari	Total		63	8	7	1	—		—		70	9
Nacional (loan)	2023	Primera División	18	2	—		5	1	1 (Note: Appearance in Supercopa Uruguaya)	0	24	3
Ternana	2023–24	Serie B	18	5	—		—		2 (Note: Appearances in Serie B relegation play-offs)	1	20	6
Genoa	2024–25	Serie A	2	0	—		—		—		2	0
Career total			258	70	16	5	36	3	6	1	316	79

=== International ===
As of match played 7 October 2021

Appearances and goals by national team and year
National team	Year	Apps	Goals
Uruguay	2017	1	0
Uruguay	2018	4	2
Uruguay	2019	5	2
Uruguay	2020	0	0
Uruguay	2021	3	1
Total		13	5

International goals

Scores and results list Uruguay's goal tally first.

No.	Date	Venue	Opponent	Score	Result	Competition
1.	7 September 2018	NRG Stadium, Houston, United States	Mexico	4–1	4–1	Friendly
2.	16 October 2018	Saitama Stadium, Saitama, Japan	Japan	1–1	3–4	2018 Kirin Challenge Cup
3.	22 March 2019	Guangxi Sports Center, Nanning, China	Uzbekistan	1–0	3–0	2019 China Cup
4.	25 March 2019	Guangxi Sports Center, Nanning, China	Thailand	2–0	4–0	2019 China Cup
5.	9 September 2021	Estadio Campeón del Siglo, Montevideo, Uruguay	Ecuador	1–0	1–0	2022 FIFA World Cup qualification

== Honours ==
Nacional

- Uruguayan Primera División: 2014–15

PSV

- Eredivisie: 2015–16, 2017–18
- Johan Cruijff Shield: 2015, 2016

Individual

- Eredivisie Player of the Month: October 2017
