= Danny Wintjens =

Dutch footballer

Personal information
- Date of birth: 30 September 1983 (age 43)
- Place of birth: Maastricht, Netherlands
- Height: 2.01 m (6 ft 7 in)
- Position: Goalkeeper

Senior career*
| Years | Team | Apps | (Gls) |
| 2000–2005 | MVV | 68 | (0) |
| 2005–2006 | Twente | 0 | (0) |
| 2006–2007 | Heerenveen | 0 | (0) |
| 2007–2009 | VVV-Venlo | 38 | (0) |
| 2009–2012 | Fortuna Sittard | 98 | (0) |
| 2012–2013 | PEC Zwolle | 5 | (0) |
| 2013–2015 | VVV-Venlo | 10 | (0) |
| 2015 | → PSV (loan) | 0 | (0) |
| 2015 | → Jong PSV | 4 | (0) |
| Total | | 223 | (0) |
- * Club domestic league appearances and goals

Danny Wintjens (born 30 September 1983, in Maastricht) is a Dutch former professional football goalkeeper. His played for MVV Maastricht, FC Twente, SC Heerenveen, Fortuna Sittard, PEC Zwolle, VVV-Venlo and PSV Eindhoven.
