= Augustine Loof =

Dutch footballer (born 1996)

Personal information
- Date of birth: 1 January 1996 (age 30)
- Place of birth: Koewacht, Netherlands
- Height: 1.81 m (5 ft 11 in)
- Position: Centre-back

Team information
- Current team: UNA

Youth career
- RKVV Koewacht
- JVOZ Vlissingen
- 2011–2014: PSV

Senior career*
Years	Team	Apps	(Gls)
2014–2016	Jong PSV	48	(2)
2016–2019	FC Eindhoven	67	(0)
2019–2022	Balzan	56	(3)
2023–2024	HSV Hoek	19	(0)
2025–	UNA	0	(0)

International career
2013	Netherlands U17	3	(0)
2023	Sierra Leone	1	(0)
- * Club domestic league appearances and goals as of 08:37, 20 July 2025 (UTC)

Augustine Loof (born 1 January 1996) is a footballer who plays as a centre-back for UNA. Born in Netherlands, he represented for the Sierra Leone national football team

== Career ==
Loof made his professional debut as Jong PSV player in the Jupiler League on 3 October 2014 against Roda JC Kerkrade in a 1–1 draw. He played the full game.
