= Luuk Koopmans =

Dutch footballer (born 1993)

Personal information
- Date of birth: 18 November 1993 (age 32)
- Place of birth: Oss, Netherlands
- Height: 1.90 m (6 ft 3 in)
- Position: Goalkeeper

Team information
- Current team: Fortuna Sittard
- Number: 1

Youth career
- RKSV Margriet
- TOP Oss
- NEC

Senior career*
Years	Team	Apps	(Gls)
2011–2012	Oss '20		
2012–2015	FC Oss	57	(0)
2015–2020	PSV	0	(0)
2015–2018	Jong PSV	25	(0)
2018–2019	→ MVV (loan)	37	(0)
2019–2020	→ ADO Den Haag (loan)	20	(0)
2020–2023	ADO Den Haag	48	(0)
2023–	Fortuna Sittard	21	(0)
- * Club domestic league appearances and goals as of 21 May 2026

Luuk Koopmans (born 18 November 1993) is a Dutch professional footballer who plays as a goalkeeper for Eredivisie club Fortuna Sittard. He formerly played for Oss '20, NEC, FC Oss, MVV Maastricht, PSV and ADO Den Haag.

== Early life ==
Koopmans was born on 18 November 1993 in Oss.

== Club career ==
On 28 October 2020, Koopmans scored in extra time in a KNVB Beker match against Sparta Rotterdam at an empty Cars Jeans Stadion. In doing so, Koopmans became the first ADO goalkeeper to score from the run of play since Martin Hansen scored against PSV Eindhoven in 2015 in an Eredivisie match.

On 29 June 2023, Koopmans joined Fortuna Sittard on a two-year deal.

== Career statistics ==
As of match played 7 March 2020.

Appearances and goals by club, season and competition
Club	Season	League			KNVB Cup		Europe		Other		Total	
Club	Season	Division	Apps	Goals	Apps	Goals	Apps	Goals	Apps	Goals	Apps	Goals
NEC	2010–11	Eredivisie	—		—		—		—		0	0
Oss '20	2011–12	Eerste Klasse	—		—		—		—		0	0
FC Oss	2012–13	Jupiler League	17	0	1	0	—		—		18	0
FC Oss	2013–14	Jupiler League	13	0	—		—		—		13	0
FC Oss	2014–15	Jupiler League	27	0	1	0	—		2	0	30	0
FC Oss	Total		57	0	2	0	0	0	2	0	61	0
Jong PSV	2015–16	Jupiler League	13	0	—		—		—		13	0
Jong PSV	2016–17	Jupiler League	7	0	—		—		—		7	0
Jong PSV	2017–18	Jupiler League	5	0	—		—		—		5	0
Jong PSV	Total		25	0	0	0	0	0	0	0	25	0
MVV Maastricht (loan)	2018–19	Keuken Kampioen Divisie	37	0	1	0	—		—		38	0
ADO Den Haag (loan)	2019–20	Eredivisie	20	0	1	0	—		—		21	0
Career total			139	0	4	0	0	0	2	0	145	0

== Honours ==
=== Club ===
PSV

- Eredivisie: 2015–16
- Johan Cruyff Shield: 2016
