= Sander Heesakkers =

Dutch footballer

Personal information
- Full name: Sander Heesakkers
- Date of birth: 8 January 1995 (age 31)
- Place of birth: 's-Hertogenbosch, Netherlands
- Height: 1.80 m (5 ft 11 in)
- Position: Left back

Youth career
- LSV Lennisheuvel
- ODC Boxtel
- RKVVO Oerle
- 2007–2013: PSV

Senior career*
Years	Team	Apps	(Gls)
2013–2016	Jong PSV	51	(1)
2016–2017	Dessel Sport	0	(0)
2017–2018	Geldrop		
2018–2020	Kozakken Boys	16	(1)
2020–2021	FC Eindhoven AV		
2021	KFC Lille United		
2021	Geldrop		

International career
2013	Netherlands U19	2	(0)
- * Club domestic league appearances and goals as of 13:50, 28 November 2020 (UTC)

Sander Heesakkers (born 8 January 1995) is a Dutch retired footballer who played as a left back.

== Club career ==
Heesakkers, from Boxtel, joined PSV in 2007 and made his professional debut as Jong PSV player in the Jupiler League on 30 September 2013 in a 2–1 home win against Jong Twente. In his debut season, he played 11 league games. He moved abroad to play for Dessel Sport in Belgium in 2016 and joined amateur side Kozakken Boys from Geldrop in 2018.

He retired in January 2021 at Geldrop, after he had rejoined them from Belgian side KFC Lille United. He only played two months for Lille.

== International career ==
Heesakkers played twice for the Netherlands national under-19 football team in 2013.
