= Daryl Werker =

Dutch footballer (born 1994)

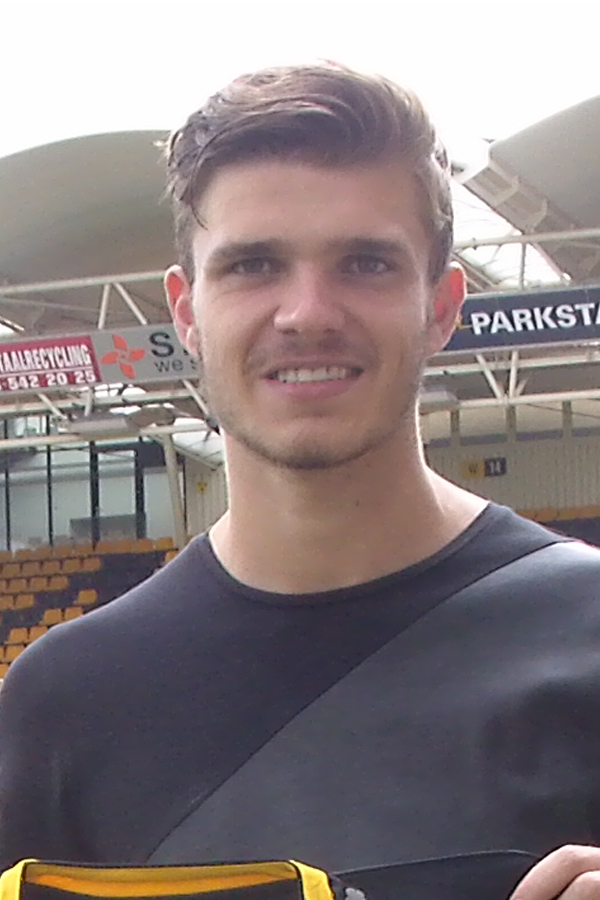

Personal information
- Date of birth: 27 June 1994 (age 32)
- Place of birth: Mechelen, Netherlands
- Height: 1.90 m (6 ft 3 in)
- Position: Centre-back

Youth career
- RKMVC
- Roda JC Kerkrade

Senior career*
Years	Team	Apps	(Gls)
2012–2020	Roda JC Kerkrade	74	(1)
2016	→ MVV (loan)	13	(0)
2020–2021	Xanthi	23	(1)
2021–2022	Roda JC Kerkrade	30	(1)
2022–2024	ADO Den Haag	22	(0)
- * Club domestic league appearances and goals as of 17:12, 23 June 2024 (UTC)

Daryl Werker (born 27 June 1994) is a Dutch professional footballer who plays as a centre-back.

== Club career ==
On 18 August 2021, he returned to Roda JC on a one-year deal after having played one season for Greek club Xanthi.

Werker joined ADO Den Haag on 28 June 2022, signing a two-year contract with an option for an additional year. On 3 April, the club announced that his contract had not been renewed ahead of the 2024–25 season.
