= Jeffrey Bruma =

Dutch footballer (born 1991)

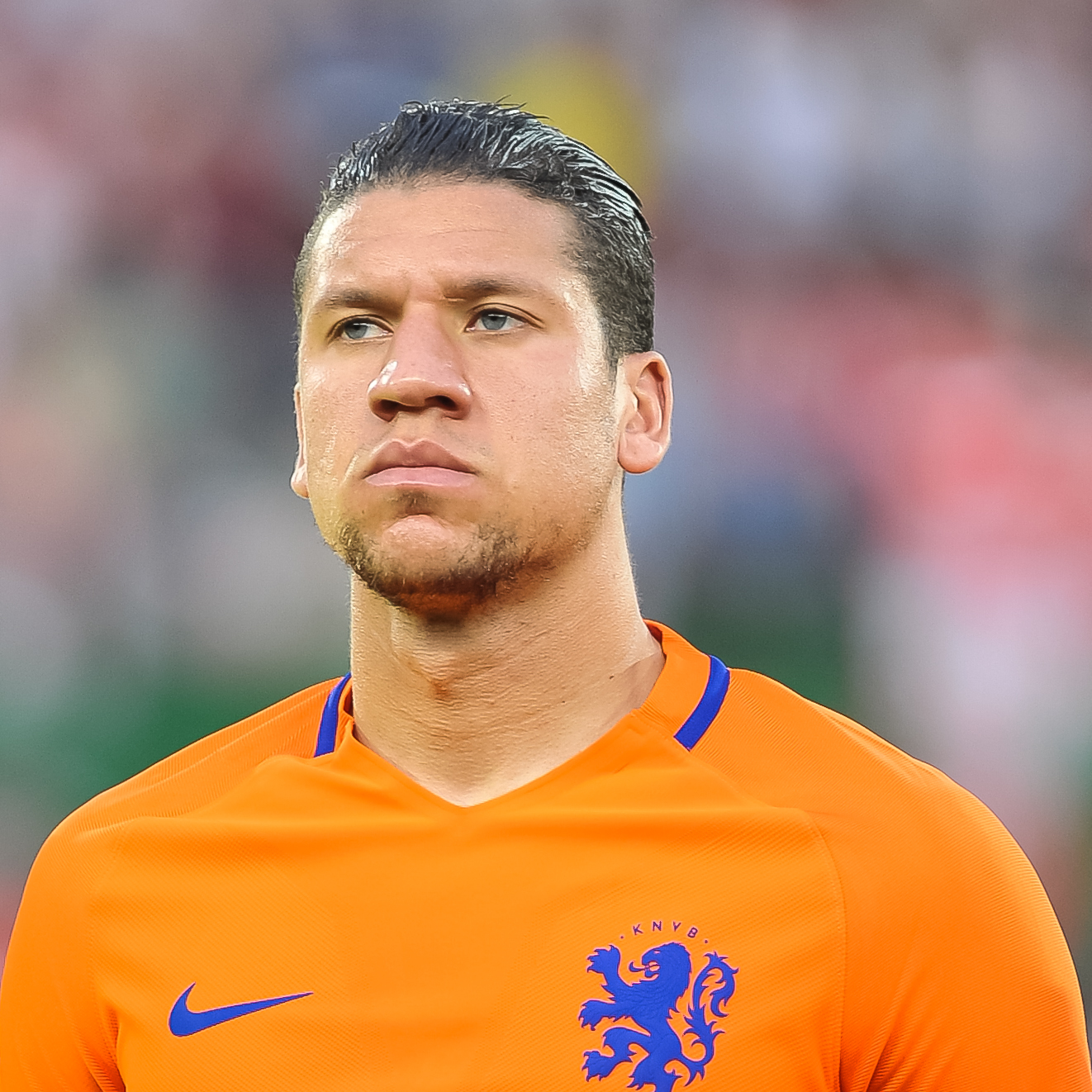
- Bruma with the Netherlands in 2016

Personal information
- Full name: Jeffrey Kevin van Homoet Bruma
- Date of birth: 13 November 1991 (age 35)
- Place of birth: Rotterdam, Netherlands
- Height: 1.86 m (6 ft 1 in)
- Position: Centre-back

Youth career
- 2006–2007: Feyenoord
- 2007–2009: Chelsea

Senior career*
Years	Team	Apps	(Gls)
2009–2013	Chelsea	4	(0)
2011	→ Leicester City (loan)	11	(2)
2011–2013	→ Hamburger SV (loan)	40	(3)
2011–2013	→ Hamburger SV II (loan)	3	(1)
2013–2016	PSV	94	(7)
2016–2021	VfL Wolfsburg	40	(1)
2019	→ Schalke 04 (loan)	9	(0)
2020	→ Mainz 05 (loan)	8	(0)
2021–2023	Kasımpaşa	25	(0)
2023	SC Heerenveen	12	(0)
2023–2024	RKC Waalwijk	12	(0)

International career
2006–2007	Netherlands U16	6	(0)
2007–2008	Netherlands U17	11	(0)
2008–2009	Netherlands U19	7	(0)
2009–2013	Netherlands U21	19	(0)
2010–2016	Netherlands	25	(1)
- * Club domestic league appearances and goals as of 19 May 2024

Jeffrey Kevin van Homoet Bruma (Dutch pronunciation: [ˈdʑɛfri ˈbrymaː]; born 13 November 1991) is a Dutch professional footballer who plays as a centre-back.

== Club career ==
=== Chelsea ===
Bruma joined Chelsea's youth setup from Feyenoord at the age of 15 for a fee of £100,000, and was making appearances for the reserve team by the age of 16. In the 2007–08 season, Bruma played centre back in every round of the FA Youth Cup run to the final and made the most appearances in the youth league. Bruma also played for the Netherlands U-21 national team.

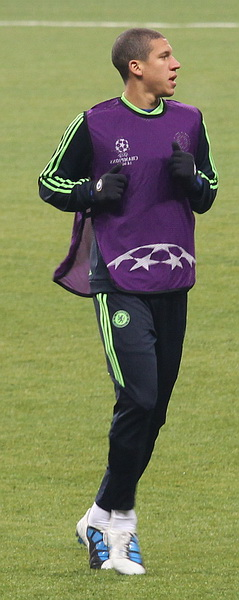
Bruma warming up before a Champions League match.

In September 2009, Bruma was added to Chelsea's UEFA Champions League squad and was on the bench against Porto. On 13 October 2009, Bruma made his debut for the Netherlands U-21 national football team in an Under-21 Championship qualifying game victory over Poland. Eleven days later, Bruma made his Premier League debut for Chelsea, coming on as a substitute in a 5–0 victory over Blackburn Rovers.

On 2 December 2009, Bruma made his League Cup debut, coming on as a substitute for Juliano Belletti in the quarter final in a match against Blackburn Rovers, a match which Chelsea later lost on penalties.

On 20 February 2010, Bruma made his second Premier League appearance, in the 2–0 victory at Wolverhampton Wanderers, where he was a 56th-minute substitute replacing the injured Yuri Zhirkov.

Although Bruma was playing for Chelsea's first team, he was also playing in the youth squad, scoring a goal in the FA Youth Cup Final; First Leg at Villa Park. Chelsea went on to beat Aston Villa 3–2 on aggregate to lift the trophy for the first time since 1961.

He was named in the Netherlands squad in July 2010. He featured in a friendly match against Ukraine, which finished 1–1 earning his first cap. On 1 September 2010, Bruma signed a new four-year contract which would keep him at Chelsea until at least 2014.

He came on for Alex against Blackpool on 19 September 2010 and played a whole 90 minutes in a League Cup match against Newcastle on 22 September 2010.

Bruma had his first start in the Premier League in a home game against Aston Villa, where he partnered captain John Terry in central defence. The match was played on 2 January 2011 and ended in a 3–3 draw. Bruma played the whole game.

==== Loan to Leicester City ====
On 11 February 2011, Bruma joined Leicester City on loan until the end of the 2010–11 season, where he linked up with fellow Chelsea loanee Patrick van Aanholt. He made his debut for Leicester as a second-half substitute for Sol Bamba in the 84th of the team's 2–0 away win at Derby County on 12 February 2011. Bruma made his first start in a 2–0 defeat to Cardiff City.

Bruma stated that he aimed to use the loan to Leicester City to earn a place in Chelsea's first team or a move elsewhere. If not he stated he would like to go on loan again.

On 2 April 2011, against Middlesbrough, Bruma conceded a penalty for handball that was saved by goalkeeper, Chris Weale. Shortly after this incident he received the first red card of his senior career after receiving two yellow cards for dissent towards the referee. Leicester City drew the game 3–3.

Leicester had not won in the first seven starts Bruma had for the club. He was then moved into central midfield and he scored his first two league goals in a 4–2 win over Watford on 25 April 2011; both efforts were struck from 30 yards out.

==== Loan to Hamburger SV ====
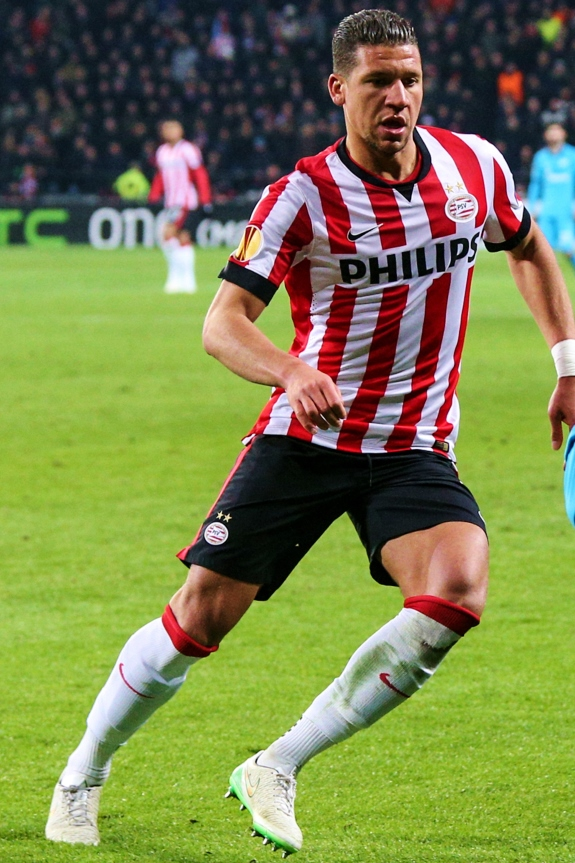
Bruma playing for PSV in 2015.

Bruma joined Hamburger SV on a one-year loan deal, until 30 June 2012, with an option for another year and was given the number 5 shirt. On 23 September 2011, he scored his first Bundesliga goal in a 2–1 victory against VfB Stuttgart, the equalizing goal to make the score 1–1.

Bruma's loan was extended for another season at Hamburger SV after making 22 appearances and scoring two goals in the previous season. In April 2013, it was announced that the club had decided not to sign him permanently.

=== PSV ===
On 26 June 2013, it was announced that Bruma had signed a contract with PSV. As part of the deal to take Bruma to Eindhoven, Chelsea insisted there was a buy-back clause in his contract. On 30 July 2013, Bruma made his PSV debut in a 2–0 victory over Zulte Waregem, therefore giving PSV a 5–0 victory on aggregate in this UEFA Champions League qualifying tie. On 3 August 2013, Bruma made his league debut in a 3–2 victory over ADO Den Haag, playing the full 90 minutes. On 2 November 2013, Bruma scored his first PSV goal in a 1–1 draw with PEC Zwolle, netting in the third minute.

=== VfL Wolfsburg ===
On 26 June 2016, Bruma made a return to German football, signing a five-year deal with Bundesliga side VfL Wolfsburg for an undisclosed fee.

Following a five-year spell with the club, Bruma left in July 2021 at the end of his contract.

==== Loan to Schalke 04 ====
On 31 January 2019, Bruma was loaned to Schalke 04 until the end of the campaign.

==== Loan to Mainz 05 ====
On 29 January 2020, Mainz 05 announced their signing of Bruma on loan for the remainder of the 2019–20 season.

=== Kasımpaşa ===
On 3 August 2021, Bruma agreed to join Turkish side, Kasımpaşa on a two-year deal, with an option of a third year. He went onto make his debut during a 1–1 draw with Hatayspor on 14 August.

=== Heerenveen ===
On 30 January 2023, Bruma signed a contract with Heerenveen until the end of the season, replacing injured Heerenveen captain Sven van Beek, returning to the Eredivisie after 7 years.

=== RKC Waalwijk ===
On 17 July 2023, Bruma joined RKC Waalwijk on a one-year contract.

== International career ==
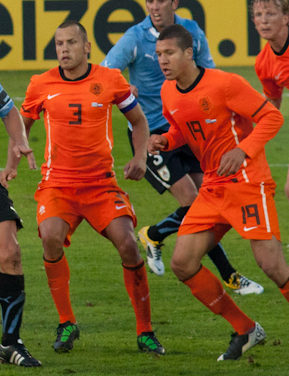
Bruma (right) with John Heitinga during a friendly against Uruguay in 2011

Bruma has represented the Netherlands at all youth levels: under-17, under-18, under-19 and under-21 levels. With the U17s, Bruma played in the 2007 European Under-17 Championship. At U21, Bruma made his debut at 17 years old, on 4 September 2009, during a qualifying match for the 2011 UEFA European Under-21 Championship against Finland, where his team won 2–0.

On 11 August 2010, Bruma received his first call-up in the selection of the Netherlands making his debut, starting against Ukraine, with Jeremain Lens, Siem de Jong and Ricky van Wolfswinkel three other debutants in the starting line, which ended a 1–1 draw. His second appearance for the Netherlands would be the 8 June 2011, another 1–1 draw against Uruguay, having replaced Joris Mathijsen at half-time.

Bruma scored his first international goal on 16 November 2014 against Latvia in a qualifying match for UEFA Euro 2016, which the Dutch won 6–0.

== Personal life ==
Bruma's mother is from Suriname and his father is Dutch. His older brother, Marciano Bruma, and his cousins Kyle Ebecilio and Noa Lang are also football players. His uncle is former Premier League full-back Fabian Wilnis.

== Career statistics ==
=== Club ===
As of match played 24 January 2023

Appearances and goals by club, season and competition
Club	Season	League			National cup (Note: Includes FA Cup, DFB-Pokal, KNVB Cup, Turkish Cup)		League cup (Note: Includes Football League Cup)		Europe		Other		Total	
Club	Season	Division	Apps	Goals	Apps	Goals	Apps	Goals	Apps	Goals	Apps	Goals	Apps	Goals
Chelsea	2009–10	Premier League	2	0	0	0	1	0	0	0	0	0	3	0
Chelsea	2010–11	Premier League	2	0	1	0	1	0	2 (Note: Appearances in UEFA Champions League)	0	1 (Note: Appearance in FA Community Shield)	0	7	0
Chelsea	Total		4	0	1	0	2	0	2	0	1	0	10	0
Leicester City (loan)	2010–11	Championship	11	2	0	0	—		—		—		11	2
Hamburger SV (loan)	2011–12	Bundesliga	22	2	1	0	—		—		—		23	2
Hamburger SV (loan)	2012–13	Bundesliga	18	1	1	0	—		—		—		19	1
Hamburger SV (loan)	Total		40	3	2	0	—		—		—		42	3
PSV Eindhoven	2013–14	Eredivisie	31	4	2	0	—		9 (Note: Four appearances in UEFA Champions League, five appearances in UEFA Europa League)	0	—		42	4
PSV Eindhoven	2014–15	Eredivisie	31	3	2	0	—		10 (Note: Appearances in UEFA Europa League)	0	—		43	3
PSV Eindhoven	2015–16	Eredivisie	32	0	3	0	—		8	0	1 (Note: Appearance in Johan Cruyff Shield)	0	44	0
PSV Eindhoven	Total		94	7	7	0	—		27	0	1	0	129	7
VfL Wolfsburg	2016–17	Bundesliga	20	1	2	0	—		—		—		22	1
VfL Wolfsburg	2017–18	Bundesliga	11	0	2	0	—		—		—		13	0
VfL Wolfsburg	2018–19	Bundesliga	0	0	0	0	—		—		—		0	0
VfL Wolfsburg	2019–20	Bundesliga	9	0	1	0	—		5	0	—		15	0
VfL Wolfsburg	2020–21	Bundesliga	0	0	1	0	—		0	0	—		1	0
VfL Wolfsburg	Total		40	1	6	0	—		5	0	—		51	1
Schalke 04 (loan)	2018–19	Bundesliga	9	0	1	0	—		2	0	—		12	0
Mainz 05 (loan)	2019–20	Bundesliga	8	0	0	0	—		—		—		8	0
Kasımpaşa	2021–22	Süper Lig	15	0	0	0	—		—		—		15	0
Kasımpaşa	2022–23	Süper Lig	10	0	1	0	—		—		—		11	0
Kasımpaşa	Total		25	0	1	0	—		—		—		26	0
Career total			231	13	18	0	2	0	36	0	2	0	289	13

=== International ===
Appearances and goals by national team and year
National team	Year	Apps	Goals
Netherlands	2010	1	0
Netherlands	2011	3	0
Netherlands	2013	3	0
Netherlands	2014	1	1
Netherlands	2015	6	0
Netherlands	2016	11	0
Total		25	1

Scores and results list Netherlands' goal tally first.

No	Date	Venue	Opponent	Score	Result	Competition
1.	16 November 2014	Amsterdam Arena, Amsterdam, Netherlands	Latvia	4–0	6–0	UEFA Euro 2016 qualification

== Honours ==
PSV

- Eredivisie: 2014–15, 2015–16
- Johan Cruyff Shield: 2015
