= 2016 Johan Cruyff Shield =

Johan Cruijff Schaal XXI
Feyenoord	PSV Eindhoven
0	1
- Date: 31 July 2016
- Venue: Amsterdam Arena, Amsterdam
- Referee: Serdar Gözübüyük
- Attendance: 30,000

The 2016 Johan Cruyff Shield was the 21st edition of the Johan Cruyff Shield (Dutch: Johan Cruijff Schaal), an annual Dutch football match played between the winners of the previous season's Eredivisie and KNVB Cup. The match was contested by Feyenoord, the 2015–16 KNVB Cup winners, and PSV Eindhoven, champions of the 2015–16 Eredivisie. It was held at the Amsterdam Arena on 31 July 2016. Watched by a crowd of 30,000 and a television audience of 1.7 million, PSV won the match 1–0.

This was the first Johan Cruyff Shield to be played after the death of its eponym Johan Cruyff. The trophy was awarded by Susila Cruyff, his daughter.

== Match ==
31 July 2016
18:00 CET

Feyenoord	0–1	PSV Eindhoven
	Report	Pröpper 38'

Amsterdam Arena, Amsterdam
Attendance: 30,000
Referee: Serdar Gözübüyük

Feyenoord	PSV

GK	30	(Sweden) Pär Hansson
RB	2	(Netherlands) Rick Karsdorp
CB	33	(Brazil) Eric Botteghin
CB	4	(Netherlands) Terence Kongolo
LB	18	(Netherlands) Miquel Nelom
CM	8	(Morocco) Karim El Ahmadi
CM	10	(Netherlands) Tonny Vilhena
AM	7	(Netherlands) Dirk Kuyt (c)
RW	28	(Netherlands) Jens Toornstra	(yellow card) 31'	(substituted off) 62'
CF	9	(Denmark) Nicolai Jørgensen		(substituted off) 77'
LW	11	(Netherlands) Eljero Elia
Substitutes:
GK	22	(Netherlands) Justin Bijlow
GK	25	(Australia) Brad Jones
DF	6	(Netherlands) Jan-Arie van der Heijden
DF	31	(Netherlands) Wessel Dammers
DF	26	(Netherlands) Bart Nieuwkoop
DF	15	(Netherlands) Lucas Woudenberg
MF	20	(Peru) Renato Tapia
MF	5	(Netherlands) Marko Vejinović
MF	27	(Sweden) Simon Gustafson
MF	36	(Norway) Emil Hansson
FW	14	(Netherlands) Bilal Başaçıkoğlu		(substituted on) 62'
FW	29	(Netherlands) Michiel Kramer		(substituted on) 77'
Manager:
(Netherlands) Giovanni van Bronckhorst

GK	1	(Netherlands) Jeroen Zoet
RB	20	(Netherlands) Joshua Brenet
CB	5	(Germany) Daniel Schwaab
CB	2	(France) Nicolas Isimat-Mirin	(yellow card) 53'
LB	15	(Netherlands) Jetro Willems	(yellow card) 31'
DM	29	(Netherlands) Jorrit Hendrix
CM	6	(Netherlands) Davy Pröpper
CM	18	(Mexico) Andrés Guardado		(substituted off) 88'
RW	7	(Uruguay) Gastón Pereiro		(substituted off) 60'
CF	9	(Netherlands) Luuk de Jong (c)
LW	19	(Netherlands) Jürgen Locadia
Substitutes:
GK	22	(Netherlands) Remko Pasveer
DF	25	(Netherlands) Menno Koch		(substituted on) 88'
DF	4	(Colombia) Santiago Arias
MF	35	(Belgium) Dante Rigo
MF	10	(Netherlands) Adam Maher
MF	23	(Netherlands) Rai Vloet
MF	38	(Sweden) Ramon Pascal Lundqvist
FW	11	(Netherlands) Luciano Narsingh		(substituted on) 60'
FW	27	(Netherlands) Steven Bergwijn
Manager:
(Netherlands) Phillip Cocu

Match officials:

- Assistant referees:
  - Charl Schaap
  - Jan de Vries
- Fourth official: Nicky Siebert

Match rules

- 90 minutes
- Penalty shoot-out if scores still level
- Maximum of twelve substitutes, of which three may be used
