= Luciano Narsingh =

Dutch footballer (born 1990)

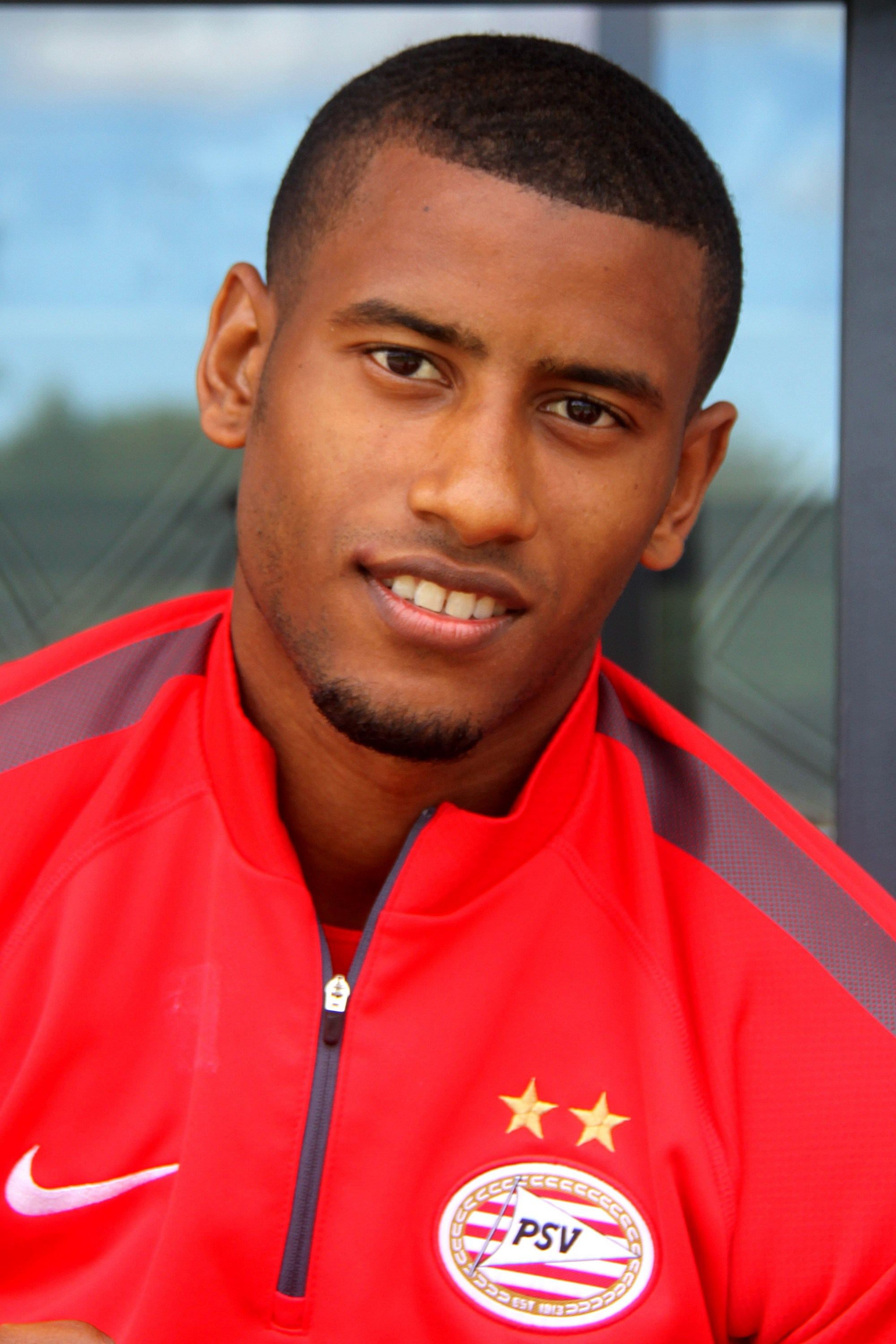
- Narsingh training with PSV in 2014

Personal information
- Full name: Luciano Rudy Narsingh
- Date of birth: 13 September 1990 (age 36)
- Place of birth: Amsterdam, Netherlands
- Height: 1.75 m (5 ft 9 in)
- Position: Right winger

Team information
- Current team: Hellas Syros
- Number: 11

Youth career
- Zeeburgia
- AZ
- Ajax
- 2006–2008: Heerenveen

Senior career*
Years	Team	Apps	(Gls)
2008–2012	Heerenveen	62	(13)
2012–2017	PSV	115	(21)
2012–2017	Jong PSV	3	(3)
2017–2019	Swansea City	33	(1)
2019–2021	Feyenoord	24	(3)
2021	→ Twente (loan)	17	(1)
2022	Sydney FC	10	(1)
2022–2023	Miedź Legnica	29	(5)
2022	Miedź Legnica II	1	(0)
2023–2025	Nea Salamina	49	(9)
2026–	Hellas Syros	3	(0)

International career
2008	Netherlands U18	2	(0)
2008–2009	Netherlands U19	10	(0)
2010	Netherlands U20	1	(0)
2010–2012	Netherlands U21	10	(1)
2012–2016	Netherlands	19	(4)
- * Club domestic league appearances and goals as of 20:00, 1 March 2026 (UTC)

Luciano Rudy Narsingh (born 13 September 1990) is a Dutch professional footballer who plays for Super League Greece 2 club Hellas Syros. He is right-footed and usually plays as a right winger but can also play as a left winger, and both side of attacking midfield. Since 2012, he has also played for the Netherlands national team, whom he represented at that year's European Championship.

== Club career ==
=== Heerenveen ===
In 2008 Narsingh signed a contract with SC Heerenveen till 2013. He made his official debut on 29 October 2008 in the Eredivisie under trainer Trond Sollied. He replaced the injured Danijel Pranjić in a 2–0 loss against Vitesse. A month later he was allowed to play in the away match against FC Twente (6–0 loss). In the 2009–10 season Narsingh also came in action twice. The following year, however, he made his breakthrough under coach Ron Jans and Narsingh grew into a sensation in the Eredivisie because of his dribbling skills, speed and passing movements and drove Roy Beerens from the first eleven. In the 2011–12 Eredivisie, Narsingh set up 20 goals, meaning he gave most assists in the Eredivisie that year. On 15 July 2012, SC Heerenveen and Dutch giants PSV Eindhoven reached an agreement to transfer the young talent to Eindhoven for an amount of €4.1 million.

=== PSV ===
The first half of Narsingh's first season started with the forward six goals and five assists and PSV comfortably led the table with eleven wins out of thirteen games played. Later in the season however Narsingh suffered a serious ligament injury against NAC Breda that would keep him out for the rest of the season. When Narsingh came back to playing form in October 2013, Dick Advocaat had been replaced by Phillip Cocu as head coach who refused to gamble on Narsingh and did not give him much playing time. In the 2014 against the defending champions Ajax Narsingh completed his recovery by first set up Memphis Depay for the equalizer and then scoring himself in a surprise 3–1 win.

On 18 April 2015, Narsingh set up the opening goal within three minutes for Luuk de Jong and then scored the final goal as PSV defeated Heerenveen 4–1 to win their 22nd Eredivisie title, and first since 2008.

=== Swansea City ===
On 12 January 2017, Narsingh signed for Premier League club Swansea City for a fee of £4 million. He scored once, the winner against Watford before the club confirmed on 18 May 2019 that he would be released when his contract expired.

=== Feyenoord ===
On 5 July 2019, Narsingh signed a two-year contract with the Eredivisie club Feyenoord. He scored his first goal for the club in a 4–0 win against FC Dinamo Tbilisi in the third qualifying round of the 2019–20 Europa League.

==== Twente (loan) ====
On 22 January 2021, Narsingh was sent on a six-month loan deal to division rivals Twente.

== International career ==
Born in the Netherlands, Narsingh is of Surinamese descent. In February 2012, Luciano Narsingh was called up for the first time by Bert van Marwijk to represent the senior Netherlands football team for the game against England at Wembley. On 7 May, he was named in the provisional list of 36 players for the UEFA Euro 2012 tournament, one of nine uncapped players to be chosen by manager Bert van Marwijk as part of the preliminary squad. He was handed his unofficial international debut in a friendly match against Bayern Munich, during which he scored once. He made the final cut of 23 players to represent the Netherlands at the tournament. He made his official debut in a friendly match against Slovakia on 30 May.

Narsingh scored his first international goal in a 4–2 defeat to Belgium on 15 August 2012. He was involved in the Netherlands' qualification for the 2014 FIFA World Cup in Brazil, scoring once and giving three assists in four games, until his injury. Narsingh was not able to participate in the World Cup due to his injury and his spot was taken by Leroy Fer.

== Career statistics ==
=== Club ===
As of match played 12 May 2024

Appearances and goals by club, season and competition
Club	Season	League			National cup (Note: Includes KNVB Cup, FA Cup, Polish Cup, Cypriot Cup)		League cup (Note: Includes EFL Cup)		Other		Total	
Club	Season	Division	Apps	Goals	Apps	Goals	Apps	Goals	Apps	Goals	Apps	Goals
SC Heerenveen	2008–09	Eredivisie	2	0	0	0	—		—		2	0
SC Heerenveen	2009–10	Eredivisie	2	0	1	0	—		—		3	0
SC Heerenveen	2010–11	Eredivisie	24	5	2	0	—		—		26	5
SC Heerenveen	2011–12	Eredivisie	34	8	5	4	—		—		39	12
SC Heerenveen	Total		62	13	8	4	—		—		70	17
PSV	2012–13	Eredivisie	18	6	2	0	—		6 (Note: Five appearances in UEFA Europa League, one appearance in Johan Cruyff Shield)	0	26	6
PSV	2013–14	Eredivisie	20	0	1	0	—		3 (Note: Appearances in UEFA Europa League)	0	24	0
PSV	2014–15	Eredivisie	32	6	3	1	—		11	1	46	8
PSV	2015–16	Eredivisie	30	8	2	0	—		8 (Note: Seven appearances in UEFA Champions League, one appearance in Johan Cruyff Shield)	1	40	9
PSV	2016–17	Eredivisie	15	1	2	1	—		6 (Note: Five appearances in UEFA Champions League, one appearance in Johan Cruyff Shield)	1	23	3
PSV	Total		115	21	10	2	—		34	3	160	26
Jong PSV	2013–14	Eerste Divisie	3	3	—						3	3
Swansea City	2016–17	Premier League	13	0	0	0	0	0	—		13	0
Swansea City	2017–18	Premier League	18	1	4	1	2	0	—		24	2
Swansea City	2018–19	EFL Championship	2	0	0	0	0	0	—		2	0
Swansea City	Total		33	1	4	1	2	0	—		39	2
Feyenoord	2019–20	Eredivisie	15	2	2	2	—		9	1	26	5
Feyenoord	2020–21	Eredivisie	9	1	0	0	—		2	0	11	1
Feyenoord	Total		24	3	2	2	—		11	1	37	6
Twente	2020–21	Eredivisie	17	1	0	0	—		0	0	17	1
Sydney FC	2021–22	A-League Men	10	1	0	0	—		4 (Note: Appearances in AFC Champions League)	0	14	1
Miedź Legnica	2022–23	Ekstraklasa	29	5	2	0	—		—		31	5
Miedź Legnica II	2022–23	III liga	1	0	—		—		—		1	0
Nea Salamis Famagusta	2023–24	Cypriot First Division	37	8	2	0	—		—		39	8
Career total			331	56	28	9	2	0	49	4	411	69

=== International goals ===
Netherlands tallies go first, scores indicate each Narsingh goal.

Goal	Date	Venue	Opponent	Score	Result	Competition
1.	15 August 2012	King Baudouin Stadium, Brussels, Belgium	Belgium	1–1	2–4	Friendly
2.	7 September 2012	Amsterdam ArenA, Amsterdam, Netherlands	Turkey	2–0	2–0	2014 World Cup qualification
3.	12 June 2015	Skonto Stadium, Riga, Latvia	Latvia	2–0	2–0	UEFA Euro 2016 qualifying
4.	29 March 2016	Wembley Stadium, London, England	England	2–1	2–1	Friendly

== Honours ==
PSV

- Eredivisie: 2014–15, 2015–16
- Johan Cruyff Shield: 2012, 2015, 2016
