= 2012–13 PSV Eindhoven season =

PSV Eindhoven
2012–13 season
- Chairman: Peter Swinkels
- Head coach: Dick Advocaat
- Stadium: Philips Stadion
- Eredivisie: 2nd
- KNVB Cup: Runners-up
- UEFA Europa League: Group stage
- Johan Cruyff Shield: Winners
- Top goalscorer: League: Dries Mertens (16); All: Georginio Wijnaldum & Tim Matavž (20)
- Highest home attendance: 34,600 vs Feyenoord; 23 September 2012
- Lowest home attendance: 14,400 vs AIK; 25 October 2012
- Average home league attendance: 29,670
Home colours	Away colours

The 2012–13 PSV Eindhoven season saw the club competing in the 2012–13 Eredivisie, 2012–13 KNVB Cup and 2012–13 UEFA Europa League.

== Squad ==
Note: Flags indicate national team as defined under FIFA eligibility rules; some limited exceptions apply. Players may hold more than one non-FIFA nationality.

No.	Pos.	Nation	Player
1	GK	POL	Przemysław Tytoń
2	DF	DEN	Mathias Jørgensen
3	DF	NED	Wilfred Bouma
4	DF	BRA	Marcelo
5	DF	NED	Erik Pieters
6	MF	NED	Mark van Bommel (captain)
7	FW	SWE	Ola Toivonen
8	MF	NED	Kevin Strootman
9	FW	SLO	Tim Matavž
10	MF	NED	Georginio Wijnaldum
11	FW	NED	Jeremain Lens
13	DF	CAN	Atiba Hutchinson
14	FW	BEL	Dries Mertens

No.	Pos.	Nation	Player
15	DF	NED	Jetro Willems
16	MF	NED	Orlando Engelaar
17	FW	NED	Luciano Narsingh
18	DF	BEL	Timothy Derijck
19	FW	NED	Jürgen Locadia
20	MF	NED	Peter van Ooijen
21	GK	NED	Boy Waterman
22	FW	NED	Memphis Depay
24	MF	AUT	Marcel Ritzmaier
25	DF	NED	Menno Koch
27	MF	SWE	Oscar Hiljemark
41	GK	NED	Nigel Bertrams

=== Players out on loan ===
Note: Flags indicate national team as defined under FIFA eligibility rules; some limited exceptions apply. Players may hold more than one non-FIFA nationality.

No.	Pos.	Nation	Player
—	GK	NED	Jeroen Zoet (at RKC Waalwijk until 30 June 2013)
—	GK	NED	Benjamin van Leer (at FC Eindhoven until 30 June 2013)
—	DF	BUL	Stanislav Manolev (at Fulham until 30 June 2013)
—	DF	NED	Casper van Beers (at FC Eindhoven until 30 June 2013)
—	DF	NED	Abel Tamata (at Roda JC until 30 June 2013)

No.	Pos.	Nation	Player
—	DF	NED	Maikel Verkoelen (at FC Eindhoven until 30 June 2013)
—	MF	BEL	Marco Ospitalieri (at FC Eindhoven until 30 June 2013)
—	MF	BEL	Jason Bourdouxhe (at FC Eindhoven until 30 June 2013)
—	FW	NED	Gianluca Maria (at FC Eindhoven until 30 June 2013)
—	FW	NED	Stef Nijland (at Brisbane Roar until 20 April 2013)
—	FW	MEX	Raúl Jimenez (at Brisbane Roar until 20 April 2013)

=== Jong PSV ===
Note: Flags indicate national team as defined under FIFA eligibility rules; some limited exceptions apply. Players may hold more than one non-FIFA nationality.

No.	Pos.	Nation	Player
26	DF	SRB	Jagoš Vuković
30	FW	BEL	Zakaria Bakkali
32	MF	NED	Tufan Özbozkurt
34	DF	NED	Dennis Dengering
35	MF	NED	Rick Schouw
36	FW	URU	Rubén Bentancourt

No.	Pos.	Nation	Player
37	MF	NED	Joshua Brenet
38	DF	NED	Wouter Soomer
39	FW	NED	Elvio van Overbeek
40	DF	NED	Thomas Horsten
42	GK	NED	Eric Verstappen

== Transfers ==
=== Summer ===
In: Note: Flags indicate national team as defined under FIFA eligibility rules; some limited exceptions apply. Players may hold more than one non-FIFA nationality.

No.	Pos.	Nation	Player
1	GK	POL	Przemysław Tytoń (from (Netherlands) Roda)
2	DF	DEN	Mathias Jørgensen (from (Denmark) Copenhagen)
6	MF	NED	Mark van Bommel (from (Italy) Milan)
17	FW	NED	Luciano Narsingh (from (Netherlands) Heerenveen)
21	GK	NED	Boy Waterman (from (Germany) Alemannia Aachen)
31	GK	NED	Ruud Swinkels (from (Netherlands) FC Eindhoven)

Out: Note: Flags indicate national team as defined under FIFA eligibility rules; some limited exceptions apply. Players may hold more than one non-FIFA nationality.

No.	Pos.	Nation	Player
1	GK	SWE	Andreas Isaksson (to (Turkey) Kasımpaşa)
15	MF	BEL	Stijn Wuytens (to (Belgium) Germinal Beerschot)
17	DF	NED	Abel Tamata (to (Netherlands) Roda)
20	MF	MAR	Zakaria Labyad (to (Portugal) Sporting CP)
23	DF	BEL	Funso Ojo (to (Belgium) Germinal Beerschot)
33	GK	MAR	Khalid Sinouh (to (Netherlands) NEC)
—	FW	NED	Género Zeefuik (to (Netherlands) Groningen)

=== Winter ===
In: Note: Flags indicate national team as defined under FIFA eligibility rules; some limited exceptions apply. Players may hold more than one non-FIFA nationality.

No.	Pos.	Nation	Player
27	MF	SWE	Oscar Hiljemark (from (Sweden) Elfsborg)

Out: Note: Flags indicate national team as defined under FIFA eligibility rules; some limited exceptions apply. Players may hold more than one non-FIFA nationality.

No.	Pos.	Nation	Player
31	GK	NED	Ruud Swinkels
—	DF	BUL	Stanislav Manolev (loan to (England) Fulham)
—	FW	NED	Stef Nijland (loan to (Australia) Brisbane Roar)

== Competitions ==
=== Johan Cruyff Shield ===
5 August 2012 Final	PSV	4 – 2	Ajax	Amsterdam
18:00 CEST (UTC+2)	Toivonen 3', 53'; Lens 11'; Strootman (yellow card) 37'; Tytoń (yellow card) 78'; Wijnaldum 90'	Summary	Dijks (yellow card) 31'; Alderweireld 44', (yellow card) 90+2'; Marcelo 75' (o.g.); De Jong (yellow card) 79'; Van Rhijn (yellow card) 90+1'	Stadium: Amsterdam Arena; Attendance: 50,000; Referee: Bjorn Kuipers

=== Eredivisie ===
==== Results summary ====
Overall								Home						Away					
Pld	W	D	L	GF	GA	GD	Pts	W	D	L	GF	GA	GD	W	D	L	GF	GA	GD
34	22	3	9	103	44	+59	69	14	0	3	58	18	+40	8	3	6	45	26	+19

==== Results by round ====
Round	1	2	3	4	5	6	7	8	9	10	11	12	13	14	15	16	17	18	19	20	21	22	23	24	25	26	27	28	29	30	31	32	33	34
Ground	A	H	A	H	A	H	A	H	H	A	H	H	A	H	A	H	A	A	H	A	H	A	H	A	H	A	H	A	A	H	A	H	H	A
Result	L	W	W	W	L	W	W	W	W	W	W	W	W	L	L	W	D	W	L	W	W	D	W	L	W	L	W	D	W	L	W	W	W	L
Position	15	7	6	3	5	3	3	2	2	2	2	1	1	1	3	1	1	1	2	1	1	1	1	1	1	2	2	2	2	3	2	2	2	2

Updated to match(es) played on 12 May 2013. Source: see below
A = Away; H = Home; W = Win; D = Draw; L = Loss

==== Matches ====
11 August 2012 1	RKC Waalwijk	3 – 2	PSV	Waalwijk
18:45 CEST (UTC+2)	Bouma 12' (o.g.); Sneijder 40', 53', (yellow card) 66'; Martina (yellow card) 71'; Ramos (yellow card) 83' (yellow-red card) 84'	Summary	Lens 8', (yellow card) 69'; Van Bommel (yellow card) 63'; Bouma (yellow card) 71'; Matavž 72'	Stadium: Mandemakers Stadion; Attendance: 6,000; Referee: Reinold Wiedemeijer

18 August 2012 2	PSV	5 – 0	Roda JC	Eindhoven
18:45 CEST (UTC+2)	Strootman 13'; Van Bommel (yellow card) 45'; Toivonen 49'; Tamata 77' (o.g.); Lens 80'; Wijnaldum 86'	Summary	De Beule (yellow card) 32'; Fledderus (yellow card) 50'; Ramzi (yellow card) 84'	Stadium: Philips Stadion; Attendance: 33,000; Referee: Danny Makkelie

26 August 2012 3	Groningen	1 – 3	PSV	Groningen
16:30 CEST (UTC+2)	Schet (yellow card) 87', (goal) 89'	Summary	Hutchinson 38'; Van Bommel (yellow card) 49'; Strootman (yellow card) 54'; Mertens 72'; Depay 84'	Stadium: Euroborg; Attendance: 20,728; Referee: Serdar Gözübüyük

2 September 2012 4	PSV	5 – 1	AZ	Eindhoven
14:30 CEST (UTC+2)	Matavž 11', 83'; Van Bommel (yellow card) 51', (goal) 54'; Marcelo 68'; Strootman (yellow card) 78'; Hutchinson 90'	Summary	Reijnen (yellow card) 7' (yellow-red card) 8'; Gorter (yellow card) 27'; Maher 28'; Marcellis (yellow card) 52'	Stadium: Philips Stadion; Attendance: 32,200; Referee: Bas Nijhuis

16 September 2012 5	Utrecht	1 – 0	PSV	Utrecht
14:30 CEST (UTC+2)	Kali (yellow card) 31' (yellow-red card) 69'; Van der Maarel (yellow card) 38'; Bulthuis 71'; Gerndt (red card) 80'	Summary	Van Bommel (yellow card) 29'; Lens (yellow card) 89'	Stadium: Stadion Galgenwaard; Attendance: 17,243; Referee: Kevin Blom

23 September 2012 6	PSV	3 – 0	Feyenoord	Eindhoven
16:30 CEST (UTC+2)	Toivonen 63'; Wijnaldum 73'; Narsingh 76'	Summary		Stadium: Philips Stadion; Attendance: 34,600; Referee: Richard Liesveld

30 September 2012 7	VVV-Venlo	0 – 6	PSV	Venlo
16:30 CEST (UTC+2)	Nwofor (yellow card) 7' (yellow-red card) 64'	Summary	Mertens 23', 35', 79'; Locadia 75', 82', 86'	Stadium: De Koel; Attendance: 8,000; Referee: Eric Braamhaar

7 October 2012 8	PSV	4 – 0	NAC Breda	Eindhoven
14:30 CEST (UTC+2)	Lens 23'; Toivonen 45+1'; Van Bommel 56'; Wijnaldum 85'	Summary		Stadium: Philips Stadion; Attendance: 32,000; Referee: Bjorn Kuipers

20 October 2012 9	PSV	3 – 2	Willem II	Eindhoven
19:45 CEST (UTC+2)	Strootman 67', 79'; Matavž 82'	Summary	Podevijn 16'; Vossebelt 23'	Stadium: Philips Stadion; Attendance: 32,000; Referee: Alexandre Boucaut

28 October 2012 10	PEC Zwolle	1 – 2	PSV	Zwolle
14:30 CET (UTC+1)	Van den Berg 54'	Summary	Derijck 75'; Van den Berg 79' (o.g.)	Stadium: IJsseldelta Stadion; Attendance: 11,324; Referee: Ed Janssen

3 November 2012 11	PSV	4 – 0	Heracles	Eindhoven
20:45 CET (UTC+1)	Mertens 19'; Narsingh 36'; Strootman 74'; Matavž 81'	Summary	Quansah (yellow card) 46' (yellow-red card) 76'	Stadium: Philips Stadion; Attendance: 33,000; Referee: Danny Makkelie

11 November 2012 12	PSV	5 – 1	Heerenveen	Eindhoven
16:30 CET (UTC+1)	Narsingh 23'; Mertens 52'; Wijnaldum 62'; Matavž 83', 86'	Summary	De Ridder 6'	Stadium: Philips Stadion; Attendance: 33,500; Referee: Serdar Gözübüyük

17 November 2012 13	ADO Den Haag	1 – 6	PSV	The Hague
18:45 CET (UTC+1)	Vicento 62'	Summary	Narsingh 14'; Strootman 23'; Mertens 33'; Wijnaldum 53'; Derijck 72'; Engelaar 81'	Stadium: Kyocera Stadion; Attendance: 10,129; Referee: Richard Liesveld

25 November 2012 14	PSV	1 – 2	Vitesse	Eindhoven
14:30 CET (UTC+1)	Derijck 5'	Summary	Reis 15'; Bony 74'	Stadium: Philips Stadion; Attendance: 33,000; Referee: Bas Nijhuis

1 December 2012 15	Ajax	3 – 1	PSV	Amsterdam
20:45 CET (UTC+1)	De Jong 29'; Van Rhijn (yellow card) 71'; Hoesen 72'; Fischer 87'	Report	Lens 36'; Van Bommel (yellow card) 57'; Narsingh (yellow card) 59'; Mertens (yellow card) 74'	Stadium: Amsterdam Arena; Attendance: 51,064; Referee: Björn Kuipers

9 December 2012 16	PSV	3 – 0	Twente	Eindhoven
16:30 CET (UTC+1)	Wijnaldum 38'; Matavž 80'; Narsingh 82'	Summary		Stadium: Philips Stadion; Attendance: 34,400; Referee: Pol van Boekel

15 December 2012 17	NEC	1 – 1	PSV	Nijmegen
20:45 CET (UTC+1)	Pálsson 80'	Summary	Jørgensen 10'	Stadium: McDOS Goffertstadion; Attendance: 11,700; Referee: Pieter Vink

22 December 2012 18	NAC Breda	1 – 6	PSV	Breda
20:45 CET (UTC+1)	Buijs 18'	Summary	Lens 11', 17'; Wijnaldum 29'; Jørgensen 37'; Narsingh 56'; Locadia 82'	Stadium: Rat Verlegh Stadion; Attendance: 18,300; Referee: Bas Nijhuis

18 January 2013 19	PSV	1 – 3	PEC Zwolle	Eindhoven
20:00 CET (UTC+1)	Matavž 42'; Pieters (red card) 67'	Summary	Benson 25', 54'; Pluim 63'	Stadium: Philips Stadion; Attendance: 33,000; Referee: Dennis Higler

26 January 2013 20	Heracles	1 – 5	PSV	Almelo
20:45 CET (UTC+1)	Everton 62'	Summary	Matavž 23'; Lens 35'; Wijnaldum 66', 76'; Mertens 76'	Stadium: Polman Stadion; Attendance: 8,500; Referee: Serdar Gözübüyük

2 February 2013 21	PSV	7 – 0	ADO Den Haag	Eindhoven
20:45 CET (UTC+1)	Wijnaldum 9', 90+1'; Supusepa 57' (o.g.); Mertens 64', 85'; Lens 66'; Locadia 80'	Summary		Stadium: Philips Stadion; Attendance: 33,000; Referee: Danny Makkelie

9 February 2013 22	Vitesse	2 – 2	PSV	Arnhem
19:45 CET (UTC+1)	Bony 77' (pen.), 88'; Janssen (red card) 83'	Summary	Mertens 19' (pen.); Wijnaldum 78'	Stadium: GelreDome; Attendance: 22,315; Referee: Pol van Boekel

16 February 2013 23	PSV	2 – 1	Utrecht	Eindhoven
19:45 CET (UTC+1)	Mertens 29'; Wijnaldum 65'; Hutchinson (yellow card) 55' (yellow-red card) 70'	Summary	Mulenga 10'	Stadium: Philips Stadion; Attendance: 32,900; Referee: Pieter Vink

24 February 2013 24	Feyenoord	2 – 1	PSV	Rotterdam
12:30 CET (UTC+1)	Schaken 47'; Pellè 68'	Summary	Lens 34'	Stadium: De Kuip; Attendance: 47,000; Referee: Bjorn Kuipers

2 March 2013 25	PSV	2 – 0	VVV-Venlo	Eindhoven
19:45 CET (UTC+1)	Depay 3'; Van Bommel 90'	Summary		Stadium: Philips Stadion; Attendance: 32,600; Referee: Kevin Blom

9 March 2013 26	Heerenveen	2 – 1	PSV	Heerenveen
18:45 CET (UTC+1)	De Roon 8'; El Ghanassy 38'	Summary	Toivonen 75'	Stadium: Abe Lenstra Stadion; Attendance: 24,984; Referee: Reinord Wiedemeijer

16 March 2013 27	PSV	2 – 0	RKC Waalwijk	Eindhoven
19:45 CET (UTC+1)	Mertens 6' (pen.); Wijnaldum 69'	Summary		Stadium: Philips Stadion; Attendance: 34,000; Referee: Jan Wegereef

31 March 2013 28	Roda JC	2 – 2	PSV	Kerkrade
12:30 CEST (UTC+2)	Demouge 13'; Malki 87'	Summary	Toivonen 19', 33'	Stadium: Parkstad Limburg Stadion; Attendance: 15,450; Referee: Danny Makkelie

6 April 2013 29	Willem II	1 – 3	PSV	Tilburg
20:45 CEST (UTC+2)	Peters 54'	Summary	Van Bommel 45+1'; Toivonen 76'; Derijck 82'	Stadium: Koning Willem II Stadion; Attendance: 13,000; Referee: Bas Nijhuis

14 April 2013 30	PSV	2 – 3	Ajax	Eindhoven
14:30 CET (UTC+1)	Lens 43', 69'	Report	Sigþórsson 33'; Fischer (yellow card) 41'; Eriksen 52'; Boerrigter 77'	Stadium: Philips Stadion; Attendance: 34,500; Referee: Björn Kuipers

20 April 2013 31	AZ	1 – 3	PSV	Alkmaar
20:45 CEST (UTC+2)	Jóhannsson 86'	Summary	Van Bommel 36'; Mertens 57'; Lens 61'	Stadium: AFAS Stadion; Attendance: 16,679; Referee: Richard Liesveld

27 April 2013 32	PSV	5 – 2	Groningen	Eindhoven
18:45 CEST (UTC+2)	Matavž 4'; Mertens 6' (pen.); Lens 13', 45'; Van Bommel 41'	Summary	De Leeuw 56', 75'	Stadium: Philips Stadion; Attendance: 34,000; Referee: Ruud Bossen

5 May 2013 33	PSV	4 – 2	NEC	Eindhoven
12:30 CEST (UTC+2)	Bovenberg 9' (o.g.); Toivonen 38'; Lens 78'; Locadia 90+7'	Summary	Van der Velden 64'; Amieux 76'	Stadium: Philips Stadion; Attendance: 33,700; Referee: Bas Nijhuis

12 May 2013 34	Twente	3 – 1	PSV	Enschede
14:30 CEST (UTC+2)	Castaignos 3'; Chadli 27'; Janssen 54'	Summary	Mertens 40' (pen.); Van Bommel (yellow card) 56' (yellow-red card) 71'	Stadium: De Grolsch Veste; Attendance: 29,350; Referee: Danny Makkelie

==== League table ====
Pos	Team	Pld	W	D	L	GF	GA	GD	Pts	Qualification or relegation
1	Ajax (C)	34	22	10	2	83	31	+52	76	Qualification for the Champions League group stage
2	PSV	34	22	3	9	103	43	+60	69	Qualification for the Champions League third qualifying round
3	Feyenoord	34	21	6	7	64	38	+26	69	Qualification to Europa League play-off round
4	Vitesse Arnhem	34	19	7	8	68	42	+26	64	Qualification for the Europa League third qualifying round
5	Utrecht (O)	34	19	6	9	55	41	+14	63	Qualification to European competition play-offs

Source: Eredivisie
Rules for classification: 1) points; 2) goal difference; 3) number of goals scored.
(C) Champions; (O) Play-off winners

=== KNVB Cup ===
27 September 2012 Second round	Achilles '29	2 – 3	PSV	Groesbeek
18:45 CEST (UTC+2)	Hendriks 2'; Rigter 63'	Report	Locadia 25'; Jørgensen 28'; Derijck 32'	Stadium: Sportpark De Heikant; Attendance: 3,800; Referee: Ruud Bossen

31 October 2012 Third round	PSV	3 – 1	EHC	Eindhoven
19:00 CET (UTC+1)	Depay 20'; Wijnaldum 74'; Maria 90+3'	Report	R. Starmans 84'	Stadium: Philips Stadion; Attendance: 22,000; Referee: Tom van Sichem

18 December 2012 Fourth round	Rijnsburgse Boys	0 – 4	PSV	Rijnsburg
20:45 CET (UTC+1)		Report	Manolev 4'; Matavž 22', 26'; Strootman 64'	Stadium: Middelmors; Attendance: 3,000; Referee: Richard Liesveld

30 January 2013 Quarter-finals	PSV	2 – 1	Feyenoord	Eindhoven
19:45 CET (UTC+1)	Mertens 20'; Van Bommel 78'	Report	Pellè 29'	Stadium: Philips Stadion; Attendance: 15,000; Referee: Kevin Blom

27 February 2013 Semi-finals	PEC Zwolle	0 – 3	PSV	Zwolle
18:45 CEST (UTC+2)		Report	Locadia 16', 34', 85'	Stadium: IJsseldelta Stadion; Attendance: 11,324; Referee: Ruud Bossen

9 May 2013 Final	AZ	2 – 1	PSV	Rotterdam
18:00 CEST (UTC+2)	Maher 12'; Altidore 14'	Report	Locadia 31'	Stadium: De Kuip; Attendance: 50,000; Referee: Bjorn Kuipers

=== UEFA Europa League ===
==== Play-off round ====
23 August 2012 First leg	Zeta (Montenegro)	0 – 5	(Netherlands) PSV	Podgorica, Montenegro
21:00 CEST (UTC+2)		Report	Toivonen 2'; Matavž 74'; Strootman 77'; Lens 83'; Van Bommel 90'	Stadium: Stadion pod Goricom^{1} Attendance: 7,001; Referee: Aleksei Nikolaev (Russia)

30 August 2012 Second leg	PSV (Netherlands)	9 – 0 (14 – 0 agg.)	(Montenegro) Zeta	Eindhoven, Netherlands
19:00 CEST (UTC+2)	Jørgensen 5'; Van Ooijen 12', 74'; Matavž 15', 27', 63'; Wijnaldum 39', 66', 83'	Report		Stadium: Philips Stadion; Attendance: 20,400; Referee: Menashe Masiah (Israel)

==== Group stage ====
Pos	Team	Pld	W	D	L	GF	GA	GD	Pts	Qualification
1	(Ukraine) Dnipro Dnipropetrovsk	6	5	0	1	16	8	+8	15	Advance to knockout phase
2	(Italy) Napoli	6	3	0	3	12	12	0	9	Advance to knockout phase
3	(Netherlands) PSV Eindhoven	6	2	1	3	8	7	+1	7	
4	(Sweden) AIK	6	1	1	4	5	14	−9	4	

Source: Soccerway

20 September 2012 1	Dnipro Dnipropetrovsk (Ukraine)	2 – 0	(Netherlands) PSV	Dnipropetrovsk, Ukraine
19:00 CEST (UTC+2)	Matheus 50'; Hutchinson 58' (o.g.)	Report		Stadium: Dnipro Arena; Attendance: 31,003; Referee: Miroslav Zelinka (Czech Republic)

4 October 2012 2	PSV (Netherlands)	3 – 0	(Italy) Napoli	Eindhoven, Netherlands
21:05 CEST (UTC+2)	Lens 19'; Mertens 41'; Marcelo 52'	Report		Stadium: Philips Stadion; Attendance: 18,200; Referee: Alexandru Tudor (Romania)

25 October 2012 3	PSV (Netherlands)	1 – 1	(Sweden) AIK	Eindhoven, Netherlands
21:05 CEST (UTC+2)	Lens 80'	Report	Karikari 61'	Stadium: Philips Stadion; Attendance: 14,400; Referee: Emir Alečković (Bosnia and Herzegovina)

8 November 2012 4	AIK (Sweden)	1 – 0	(Netherlands) PSV	Solna, Sweden
19:00 CET (UTC+1)	Bangura 12'	Report		Stadium: Råsunda Stadium; Attendance: 12,360; Referee: Maksim Layushkin (Russia)

22 November 2012 5	PSV (Netherlands)	1 – 2	(Ukraine) Dnipro Dnipropetrovsk	Eindhoven, Netherlands
21:05 CEST (UTC+2)	Wijnaldum 18'	Report	Seleznyov 24'; Konoplyanka 74'	Stadium: Philips Stadion; Attendance: 27,000; Referee: Carlos Clos Gómez (Spain)

6 December 2012 6	Napoli (Italy)	1 – 3	(Netherlands) PSV	Naples, Italy
19:00 CEST (UTC+2)	Cavani 18'	Report	Matavž 30', 41', 60'	Stadium: Stadio San Paolo; Attendance: 9,434; Referee: Mike Dean (England)

== Squad statistics ==
=== Appearances and goals ===
No.	Pos	Nat	Player	Total		Eredivisie		Super Cup		KNVB Cup		Europa League	
No.	Pos	Nat	Player	Apps	Goals	Apps	Goals	Apps	Goals	Apps	Goals	Apps	Goals
1	GK	(Poland) POL	Przemysław Tytoń	10	0	5+1	0	1+0	0	1+0	0	1+1	0
2	DF	(Denmark) DEN	Mathias Jørgensen	11	4	4+2	2	0+0	0	3+0	1	2+0	1
3	DF	(Netherlands) NED	Wilfred Bouma	29	0	17+5	0	1+0	0	2+1	0	3+0	0
4	DF	(Brazil) BRA	Marcelo	44	2	32+0	1	1+0	0	3+1	0	7+0	1
5	DF	(Netherlands) NED	Erik Pieters	2	0	1+1	0	0+0	0	0+0	0	0+0	0
6	MF	(Netherlands) NED	Mark van Bommel	35	8	28+0	6	1+0	0	3+0	1	3+0	1
7	FW	(Sweden) SWE	Ola Toivonen	22	11	15+2	8	1+0	2	1+0	0	3+0	1
8	MF	(Netherlands) NED	Kevin Strootman	42	7	32+0	5	1+0	0	5+0	1	4+0	1
9	FW	(Slovenia) SLO	Tim Matavž	39	20	17+11	11	0+0	0	3+1	2	6+1	7
10	MF	(Netherlands) NED	Georginio Wijnaldum	45	20	25+8	14	0+1	1	4+2	1	5+0	4
11	FW	(Netherlands) NED	Jeremain Lens	39	19	28+1	15	1+0	1	2+1	0	6+0	3
13	DF	(Canada) CAN	Atiba Hutchinson	44	2	33+0	2	1+0	0	4+0	0	6+0	0
14	FW	(Belgium) BEL	Dries Mertens	39	18	29+0	16	1+0	0	3+0	1	6+0	1
15	DF	(Netherlands) NED	Jetro Willems	34	0	25+1	0	1+0	0	3+0	0	4+0	0
16	MF	(Netherlands) NED	Orlando Engelaar	11	1	1+3	1	0+0	0	1+1	0	4+1	0
17	FW	(Netherlands) NED	Luciano Narsingh	26	7	14+4	7	1+0	0	2+0	0	4+1	0
18	DF	(Belgium) BEL	Timothy Derijck	34	5	22+1	4	0+0	0	4+0	1	7+0	0
19	FW	(Netherlands) NED	Jürgen Locadia	22	10	4+11	5	0+0	0	4+1	5	0+2	0
20	MF	(Netherlands) NED	Peter van Ooijen	6	2	0+0	0	0+0	0	3+0	0	3+0	2
21	GK	(Netherlands) NED	Boy Waterman	41	0	29+0	0	0+0	0	5+0	0	7+0	0
22	FW	(Netherlands) NED	Memphis Depay	30	4	2+18	2	0+1	0	3+1	1	2+3	1
24	MF	(Austria) AUT	Marcel Ritzmaier	7	0	3+1	0	0+0	0	2+0	0	1+0	0
26	DF	(Serbia) SRB	Jagoš Vuković	1	0	0+0	0	0+0	0	1+0	0	0+0	0
27	MF	(Sweden) SWE	Oscar Hiljemark	13	0	6+5	0	0+0	0	1+1	0	0+0	0
35	MF	(Netherlands) NED	Rick Schouw	1	0	0+0	0	0+0	0	0+1	0	0+0	0
35	MF	(Netherlands) NED	Joshua Brenet	1	0	0+0	0	0+0	0	0+0	0	0+1	0
Players away from PSV on loan:
23	DF	(Bulgaria) BUL	Stanislav Manolev	5	1	2+0	0	0+0	0	2+0	1	1+0	0
	FW	(Netherlands) NED	Gianluca Maria	1	1	0+0	0	0+0	0	1+0	1	0+0	0
Players who appeared for PSV no longer at the club:

=== Goal scorers ===
Place	Position	Nation	Number	Name	Eredivisie	Super Cup	KNVB Cup	Europa League	Total
1	MF	(Netherlands)	10	Georginio Wijnaldum	14	1	1	4	20
1	FW	(Slovenia)	9	Tim Matavž	11	0	2	7	20
3	FW	(Netherlands)	11	Jeremain Lens	15	1	0	3	19
4	FW	(Belgium)	14	Dries Mertens	16	0	1	1	18
5	MF	(Sweden)	7	Ola Toivonen	8	2	0	1	11
6	FW	(Netherlands)	19	Jürgen Locadia	5	0	5	0	10
7	MF	(Netherlands)	6	Mark van Bommel	6	0	1	1	8
8	FW	(Netherlands)	17	Luciano Narsingh	7	0	0	0	7
8	MF	(Netherlands)	8	Kevin Strootman	5	0	1	1	7
10	DF	(Belgium)	18	Timothy Derijck	4	0	1	0	5
11	DF	(Denmark)	2	Mathias Jørgensen	2	0	1	1	4
11				Own goal	4	0	0	0	4
13	FW	(Netherlands)	22	Memphis Depay	2	0	1	0	3
14	MF	(Netherlands)	20	Peter van Ooijen	0	0	0	2	2
14	DF	(Canada)	13	Atiba Hutchinson	2	0	0	0	2
14	DF	(Brazil)	4	Marcelo	1	0	0	1	2
17	MF	(Netherlands)	16	Orlando Engelaar	1	0	0	0	1
17	FW	(Netherlands)		Gianluca Maria	0	0	1	0	1
17	DF	(Bulgaria)	23	Stanislav Manolev	0	0	1	0	1
				TOTALS	103	4	16	22	145

=== Disciplinary record ===
Number	Nation	Position	Name	Eredivisie		Super Cup		KNVB Cup		Europa League		Total	
Number	Nation	Position	Name	Yellow card	Red card	Yellow card	Red card	Yellow card	Red card	Yellow card	Red card	Yellow card	Red card
1	(Poland)	GK	Przemysław Tytoń	0	0	1	0	0	0	0	0	1	0
2	(Denmark)	DF	Mathias Jørgensen	0	0	0	0	0	0	1	0	1	0
3	(Netherlands)	DF	Wilfred Bouma	1	0	0	0	0	0	0	0	1	0
4	(Brazil)	DF	Marcelo	4	0	0	0	1	0	0	0	5	0
5	(Netherlands)	DF	Erik Pieters	0	1	0	0	0	0	0	0	0	1
6	(Netherlands)	MF	Mark van Bommel	10	1	0	0	0	0	0	0	10	1
7	(Sweden)	FW	Ola Toivonen	1	0	0	0	0	0	0	0	1	0
8	(Netherlands)	MF	Kevin Strootman	6	0	2	0	0	0	0	0	8	0
9	(Slovenia)	FW	Tim Matavž	1	0	0	0	0	0	0	0	1	0
10	(Netherlands)	MF	Georginio Wijnaldum	1	0	0	0	1	0	0	0	2	0
11	(Netherlands)	FW	Jeremain Lens	6	0	0	0	0	0	0	0	6	0
13	(Canada)	DF	Atiba Hutchinson	5	1	0	0	0	0	0	0	5	1
14	(Belgium)	FW	Dries Mertens	2	0	0	0	0	0	0	0	2	0
17	(Netherlands)	FW	Luciano Narsingh	1	0	0	0	0	0	0	0	1	0
18	(Belgium)	DF	Timothy Derijck	1	0	0	0	0	0	0	0	1	0
15	(Netherlands)	DF	Jetro Willems	1	0	0	0	1	0	0	0	2	0
19	(Netherlands)	FW	Jürgen Locadia	0	0	0	0	1	0	0	0	1	0
23	(Bulgaria)	DF	Stanislav Manolev	1	0	0	0	0	0	0	0	1	0
24	(Austria)	MF	Marcel Ritzmaier	0	0	0	0	0	0	1	0	1	0
27	(Sweden)	MF	Oscar Hiljemark	1	0	0	0	1	0	0	0	2	0
			TOTALS	42	3	2	0	6	0	2	0	52	3

== Notes ==
- Note 1: Zeta played their home match at Stadion Pod Goricom, Podgorica instead of their regular stadium, Stadion Trešnjica, Golubovci.
