= Tufan Özbozkurt =

Turkish footballer (born 1993)

Personal information
- Date of birth: 20 March 1993 (age 33)
- Place of birth: Utrecht, Netherlands
- Height: 1.68 m (5 ft 6 in)
- Position: Left-back

Team information
- Current team: Nieuw Utrecht

Youth career
- –2002: USV Elinkwijk
- 2002–2012: PSV

Senior career*
Years	Team	Apps	(Gls)
2011–2014	Jong PSV	49	(3)
2014–2016	Konyaspor	2	(0)
2015	→ Anadolu Selçukspor (loan)	12	(1)
2015–2016	→ Anadolu Selçukspor (loan)	30	(0)
2016–2017	Polatlı Bugsaşspor	12	(0)
2018	Jong Utrecht	9	(1)
2019–2020	Lienden	5	(0)
2020–2022	TEC	5	(0)
2023	Sportlust '46	10	(0)
2023–	Nieuw Utrecht		

International career
2011	Netherland U19	1	(0)
2012	Turkey U19	1	(0)
2013	Turkey U20	1	(0)
- * Club domestic league appearances and goals as of 20:06, 12 January 2024 (UTC)

Tufan Özbozkurt (born 20 March 1993) is a Turkish footballer who plays as a left-back for Tweede Klasse club Nieuw Utrecht. He made his professional debut as Jong PSV player in the Eerste Divisie on 3 August 2013 against Sparta Rotterdam.

== Career ==
Since leaving Jong FC Utrecht in the summer 2018, Özbozkurt was left without club. In October 2019, he went on a trial at SV Spakenburg. Later in October 2019, he joined FC Lienden. At the end of November 2019, he suffered from a knee injury which later required a surgery in the anterior cruciate ligament.

== Private life ==
Özbozkurt is a very near friend of Memphis Depay, whom he has known since his time in PSV Eindhoven.
