= 2013–14 PSV Eindhoven season =

PSV Eindhoven
2013–14 season
- Chairman: Peter Swinkels
- Head coach: Phillip Cocu
- Stadium: Philips Stadion
- Eredivisie: 4th
- KNVB Cup: Third round vs Roda JC
- UEFA Champions League: Play-off Round vs A.C. Milan
- UEFA Europa League: Group stage
- Top goalscorer: League: Jürgen Locadia (13); All: Jürgen Locadia (17)
Home colours	Away colours	Third colours

The 2013–14 PSV Eindhoven season saw PSV competing in the Eredivisie, KNVB Cup, UEFA Champions League and the UEFA Europa League. PSV finished the season in 4th place in the Eredivisie, qualifying for the UEFA Europa League again, were knocked out of the KNVB Cup by Roda JC in the Third Round. In Europe PSV were knocked out of the Champions League at the Play-off Round by A.C. Milan, ending up in the Europa League group stages, from which they did not progress.

Phillip Cocu was appointed as the team's coach at the start of the season, replacing Dick Advocaat.

== Squad ==
Note: Flags indicate national team as defined under FIFA eligibility rules; some limited exceptions apply. Players may hold more than one non-FIFA nationality.

No.	Pos.	Nation	Player
1	GK	POL	Przemysław Tytoń
2	DF	DEN	Mathias Jørgensen
3	DF	NED	Karim Rekik (on loan from Manchester City)
5	DF	NED	Jeffrey Bruma
6	MF	NED	Adam Maher
8	MF	NED	Stijn Schaars (vice-captain)
9	FW	SLO	Tim Matavž
10	MF	NED	Georginio Wijnaldum (captain)
11	FW	NED	Jürgen Locadia
13	DF	COL	Santiago Arias
14	FW	SUR	Florian Jozefzoon
15	DF	NED	Jetro Willems
17	FW	NED	Luciano Narsingh

No.	Pos.	Nation	Player
19	FW	BEL	Zakaria Bakkali
20	MF	NED	Peter van Ooijen
21	GK	NED	Jeroen Zoet
22	FW	NED	Memphis Depay
23	FW	CRC	Bryan Ruiz (on loan from Fulham)
25	DF	NED	Menno Koch
26	DF	NED	Joshua Brenet
27	MF	SWE	Oscar Hiljemark
28	DF	NED	Abel Tamata
29	DF	NED	Jorrit Hendrix
31	GK	NED	Nigel Bertrams
33	MF	KOR	Park Ji-Sung (on loan from Queens Park Rangers)
47	FW	NED	Rai Vloet

=== Players out on loan ===
Note: Flags indicate national team as defined under FIFA eligibility rules; some limited exceptions apply. Players may hold more than one non-FIFA nationality.

No.	Pos.	Nation	Player
18	DF	BEL	Timothy Derijck (at FC Utrecht until 30 July 2014)
24	MF	AUT	Marcel Ritzmaier (at SC Cambuur until 30 July 2014)

== Transfers ==
=== Summer ===
In: Note: Flags indicate national team as defined under FIFA eligibility rules; some limited exceptions apply. Players may hold more than one non-FIFA nationality.

No.	Pos.	Nation	Player
3	DF	NED	Karim Rekik (loan from (England) Manchester City)
5	DF	NED	Jeffrey Bruma (from (England) Chelsea)
6	MF	NED	Adam Maher (from (Netherlands) AZ Alkmaar)
8	MF	NED	Stijn Schaars (from (Portugal) Sporting CP)
13	DF	COL	Santiago Arias (from (Portugal) Sporting CP)
14	MF	NED	Florian Jozefzoon (from (Netherlands) RKC Waalwijk)
23	DF	BUL	Stanislav Manolev (loan return from (England) Fulham)
33	MF	KOR	Park Ji-sung (loan from (England) Queens Park Rangers)

Out: Note: Flags indicate national team as defined under FIFA eligibility rules; some limited exceptions apply. Players may hold more than one non-FIFA nationality.

No.	Pos.	Nation	Player
4	DF	BRA	Marcelo (to (Germany) Hannover)
5	DF	NED	Erik Pieters (to (England) Stoke City)
8	MF	NED	Kevin Strootman (to (Italy) Roma)
11	FW	NED	Jeremain Lens (to (Ukraine) Dynamo Kyiv)
13	DF	CAN	Atiba Hutchinson (to (Turkey) Beşiktaş)
14	FW	NED	Dries Mertens (to (Italy) Napoli)
18	DF	BEL	Timothy Derijck (loan to (Netherlands) Utrecht)
21	GK	NED	Boy Waterman (to (Turkey) Kardemir Karabükspor)
24	MF	AUT	Marcel Ritzmaier (loan to (Netherlands) Cambuur)
—	FW	NED	Stef Nijland (to (Netherlands) PEC Zwolle)

=== Winter ===
In: Note: Flags indicate national team as defined under FIFA eligibility rules; some limited exceptions apply. Players may hold more than one non-FIFA nationality.

No.	Pos.	Nation	Player
23	FW	CRC	Bryan Ruiz (loan from (England) Fulham)
—	DF	NED	Alex Schalk (loan from (Netherlands) NAC Breda)

Out: Note: Flags indicate national team as defined under FIFA eligibility rules; some limited exceptions apply. Players may hold more than one non-FIFA nationality.

No.	Pos.	Nation	Player
7	FW	SWE	Ola Toivonen (to (France) Stade Rennais)
23	DF	BUL	Stanislav Manolev (to (Russia) Kuban Krasnodar)

== Competitions ==
=== Eredivisie ===
==== Results summary ====
Overall								Home						Away					
Pld	W	D	L	GF	GA	GD	Pts	W	D	L	GF	GA	GD	W	D	L	GF	GA	GD
34	18	5	11	60	45	+15	59	11	3	3	34	18	+16	7	2	8	26	27	−1

==== Results by round ====
Round	1	2	3	4	5	6	7	8	9	10	11	12	13	14	15	16	17	18	19	20	21	22	23	24	25	26	27	28	29	30	31	32	33	34
Ground	A	H	H	A	H	A	H	A	H	A	A	H	A	H	A	H	A	H	A	H	A	A	H	H	A	A	H	A	H	H	A	H	A	H
Result	W	W	W	D	D	D	W	L	W	L	L	D	L	D	L	L	W	W	L	W	L	W	W	W	W	W	W	W	W	L	L	L	W	W
Position	5	1	1	2	2	2	2	1	2	2	2	5	8	8	10	10	9	7	8	6	7	7	6	5	5	5	5	5	3	5	5	5	4	4

Updated to match(es) played on 22 August 2014. Source: see below
A = Away; H = Home; W = Win; D = Draw; L = Loss

==== Matches ====
3 August 2013 1	ADO Den Haag	2 – 3	PSV Eindhoven	The Hague
18:45 CEST (UTC+2)	Holla 44'; Van Duinen 90+3'	Summary	Wijnaldum 12'; Holla 27' (o.g.); Willems 33'	Stadium: Kyocera Stadion; Attendance: 13,120; Referee: Bas Nijhuis

10 August 2013 2	PSV Eindhoven	5 – 0	NEC	Eindhoven
20:45 CEST (UTC+2)	Bakkali 6', 47', 82'; Wijnaldum 61', 75'	Summary		Stadium: Philips Stadion; Attendance: 31.500; Referee: Bjorn Kuipers

17 August 2013 3	PSV Eindhoven	3 – 0	Go Ahead Eagles	Eindhoven
18:45 CEST (UTC+2)	Jozefzoon 48'; Hiljemark 56'; Memphis 83'	Summary		Stadium: Philips Stadion; Attendance: 32,000; Referee: Kevin Blom

24 August 2013 4	Heracles	1 – 1	PSV Eindhoven	Almelo
19:45 CEST (UTC+2)	Duarte 6'	Summary	Park 86'	Stadium: Polman Stadion; Attendance: 8,250; Referee: Reinold Wiedemeijer

31 August 2013 5	PSV Eindhoven	0 – 0	Cambuur	Eindhoven
20:45 CEST (UTC+2)		Summary		Stadium: Philips Stadion; Attendance: 34,500; Referee: Dennis Higler

14 September 2013 6	Twente	2 – 2	PSV Eindhoven	Enschede
20:45 CEST (UTC+2)	Eghan 17'; Promes 70'	Summary	Wijnaldum 66'; Memphis 83'	Stadium: De Grolsch Veste; Attendance: 29,750; Referee: Pol van Boekel

22 September 2013 7	PSV Eindhoven	4 – 0	Ajax	Eindhoven
16:30 CEST (UTC+2)	Matavž 53'; Willems 61'; Hiljemark 64'; Park 68'	Report		Stadium: Philips Stadion; Attendance: 33,300; Referee: Bas Nijhuis

28 September 2013 8	AZ	2 – 1	PSV Eindhoven	AFAS Stadion
18:45 CEST (UTC+2)	Viergever 21'; Jóhannsson 57'	Summary	Memphis 35'	Stadium: AFAS Stadion; Attendance: 16,032; Referee: Bjorn Kuipers

6 October 2013 9	PSV Eindhoven	2 – 1	RKC Waalwijk	Eindhoven
16:30 CEST (UTC+2)	Toivonen 23'; Locadia 89'	Summary	Braber 45'; Duits (yellow card) 44' (yellow-red card) 85'	Stadium: Philips Stadion; Attendance: 32,200; Referee: Ed Janssen

20 October 2013 10	Groningen	1 – 0	PSV Eindhoven	Groningen
14:30 CEST (UTC+2)	Kostić 50'	Summary		Stadium: Euroborg; Attendance: 19,776; Referee: Kevin Blom

27 October 2013 11	Roda JC	2 – 1	PSV Eindhoven	Kerkrade
12:30 CET (UTC+1)	Fledderus 68'; Németh 85'	Summary	Matavž 9'; Memphis (yellow card) 63' (yellow-red card) 72'	Stadium: Parkstad Limburg Stadion; Attendance: 15,063; Referee: Richard Liesveld

2 November 2013 12	PSV Eindhoven	1 – 1	PEC Zwolle	Eindhoven
20:45 CET (UTC+1)	Bruma 3'	Summary	Benson 14' (yellow card) 7' (yellow-red card) 85'	Stadium: Philips Stadion; Attendance: 33,100; Referee: Pieter Vink

10 November 2013 13	NAC Breda	2 – 1	PSV Eindhoven	Breda
14:30 CET (UTC+1)	Kwakman 67', 80'	Summary	Locadia 44'	Stadium: Rat Verlegh Stadion; Attendance: 18,400; Referee: Reinold Wiedemeijer

23 November 2013 14	PSV Eindhoven	1 – 1	Heerenveen	Eindhoven
18:45 CET (UTC+1)	Jozefzoon 90+1'	Summary	van den Berg (red card) 15'; Wildschut 80'	Stadium: Philips Stadion; Attendance: 34,000; Referee: Serder Gözübüyük

1 December 2013 15	Feyenoord	3 – 1	PSV Eindhoven	Rotterdam
14:30 CET (UTC+1)	Boëtius 45+1'; Pellè 54' (pen.), 65'	Report	Maher 21'; Bruma (yellow card) 57' (yellow-red card)	Stadium: De Kuip; Attendance: 47,500; Referee: Danny Makkelie

7 December 2013 16	PSV	2 – 6	Vitesse Arnhem	Eindhoven
20:45 CET (UTC+1)	Memphis 45'; Rekik 84'	Summary	Piazon 38'; Havenaar 66'; Leerdam 75'; Pröpper 85', 90+3'; Van Aanholt 87'	Stadium: Philips Stadion; Attendance: 33,000; Referee: Bas Nijhuis

15 December 2013 17	Utrecht	1 – 5	PSV Eindhoven	Utrecht
16:30 CET (UTC+1)	De Ridder (yellow card) 27' (yellow-red card); Bulthuis (yellow card) 70' (yellow-red card) (goal) 64'	Summary	Maher 3', 90+2'; Memphis 13', 33' (pen.); Locadia 30'	Stadium: Stadion Galgenwaard; Attendance: 20,011; Referee: Pol van Boekel

22 December 2013 18	PSV Eindhoven	2 – 0	ADO Den Haag	Eindhoven
16:30 CET (UTC+1)	Locadia 33' (pen.), 41'	Summary	Coutinho (red card) 31'	Stadium: Philips Stadion; Attendance: 32,000; Referee: Tom van Sichem

19 January 2014 19	Ajax	1 – 0	PSV Eindhoven	Amsterdam
16:30 CET (UTC+1)	Sigþórsson 64'	Report		Stadium: Amsterdam Arena; Attendance: 51,396; Referee: Björn Kuipers

25 January 2014 20	PSV Eindhoven	1 – 0	AZ	Eindhoven
20:45 CET (UTC+1)	Willems 3'	Summary		Stadium: Philips Stadion; Attendance: 32,000; Referee: Pol van Boekel

2 February 2014 21	RKC Waalwijk	2 – 0	PSV Eindhoven	Waalwijk
16:30 CET (UTC+1)	Sno 54', 90+3'	Summary		Stadium: Mandemakers Stadion; Attendance: 7,023; Referee: Bas Nijhuis

5 February 2014 22	Cambuur	1 – 2	PSV Eindhoven	Leeuwarden
18:45 CET (UTC+1)	Manu 2'	Summary	Bruma 38'; Locadia 61'	Stadium: Cambuur Stadion; Attendance: 9,600; Referee: Pieter Vink

8 February 2014 23	PSV Eindhoven	3 – 2	Twente	Eindhoven
18:45 CET (UTC+1)	Arias 7'; Locadia 23'; Willems 52'	Summary	Promes 40'; Ebecilio 68'	Stadium: Philips Stadion; Attendance: 33,000; Referee: Kevin Blom

14 February 2014 24	PSV Eindhoven	2 – 1	Heracles	Eindhoven
20:00 CET (UTC+1)	Memphis 5'; Ruiz 63'	Summary	Linssen 42'	Stadium: Philips Stadion; Attendance: 32,500; Referee: Richard Liesveld

22 February 2014 25	NEC	0 – 2	PSV Eindhoven	Nijmegen
20:45 CET (UTC+1)		Summary	Ruiz 58'; Memphis 82'	Stadium: Stadion de Goffert; Attendance: 11,800; Referee: Bjorn Kuipers

1 March 2014 26	Go Ahead Eagles	2 – 3	PSV Eindhoven	Deventer
19:45 CET (UTC+1)	Antonia 1'; Falkenburg 25'	Summary	Memphis 49'; Locadia 67'; Ruiz 90'	Stadium: De Adelaarshorst; Attendance: 7,898; Referee: Reinold Wiedemeijer

8 March 2014 27	PSV Eindhoven	1 – 0	Utrecht	Eindhoven
20:45 CET (UTC+1)	Locadia 51'	Summary		Stadium: Philips Stadion; Attendance: 33,200; Referee: Serdar Gözübüyük

15 March 2014 28	Vitesse Arnhem	1 – 2	PSV Eindhoven	Arnhem
18:45 CET (UTC+1)	Labyad 18'	Summary	Locadia 7'; Memphis 29'	Stadium: GelreDome; Attendance: 23,076; Referee: Kevin Blom

22 March 2014 29	PSV Eindhoven	3 – 1	Roda JC	Eindhoven
20:45 CET (UTC+1)	Locadia 14'; Ruiz 63'; Bruma 75'	Summary	Paulissen 41'	Stadium: Philips Stadion; Attendance: 32,700; Referee: Danny Makkelie

29 March 2014 30	PSV Eindhoven	2 – 3	Groningen	Eindhoven
20:45 CEST (UTC+2)	Memphis 3'; Locadia 36' (pen.)	Summary	Zivkovic 18'; Kostić 20'; Chery 64'	Stadium: Philips Stadion; Attendance: 34,100; Referee: Tom van Sichem

5 April 2014 31	Heerenveen	3 – 0	PSV Eindhoven	Heerenveen
18:45 CEST (UTC+2)	Başaçikoğlu 31' van La Parra 79'; Finnbogason 87'	Summary		Stadium: Abe Lenstra Stadion; Attendance: 25,600; Referee: Richard Liesveld

13 April 2014 32	PSV Eindhoven	0 – 2	Feyenoord	Eindhoven
16:30 CEST (UTC+2)		Report	Mathijsen 29'; Janmaat 76'	Stadium: Philips Stadion; Attendance: 34,300; Referee: Bjorn Kuipers

27 April 2014 33	PEC Zwolle	1 – 2	PSV Eindhoven	Zwolle
14:30 CEST (UTC+2)	Saymak 62'	Summary	Locadia 21'; Ruiz 74'	Stadium: IJsseldelta Stadion; Attendance: 12,350; Referee: Danny Makkelie

3 May 2014 34	PSV Eindhoven	2 – 0	NAC Breda	Eindhoven
18:45 CEST (UTC+2)	Memphis 16'; Bruma 60'	Summary		Stadium: Philips Stadion; Attendance: 34,000; Referee: Reinold Wiedemeijer

==== League table ====
Pos	Team	Pld	W	D	L	GF	GA	GD	Pts	Qualification or relegation
2	Feyenoord	34	20	7	7	76	40	+36	67	Qualification for the Champions League third qualifying round
3	Twente	34	17	12	5	72	37	+35	63	Qualification for the Europa League play-off round
4	PSV	34	18	5	11	60	45	+15	59	Qualification for the Europa League third qualifying round
5	Heerenveen	34	16	9	9	72	51	+21	57	Qualification for the European competition play-offs
6	Vitesse Arnhem	34	15	10	9	65	49	+16	55	Qualification for the European competition play-offs

Source: Eredivisie
Rules for classification: 1) points; 2) goal difference; 3) number of goals scored

=== KNVB Cup ===
25 September 2013 Second round	PSV Eindhoven	4 – 1	Telstar	Eindhoven
17:45 CEST (UTC+2)	Jozefzoon 40'; Locadia 45+3' (pen.), 74' (pen.), 90'	Report	Matusiwa 9'	Stadium: Philips Stadion; Attendance: 15,800; Referee: Reinold Wiedemeijer

30 October 2013 Third round	PSV Eindhoven	1 – 3	Roda JC	Eindhoven
18:45 CEST (UTC+2)	Brenet 87'	Report	Fledderus 18'; Hupperts 37', 67'	Stadium: Philips Stadion; Attendance: 19,000; Referee: Pol van Boekel

=== UEFA Champions League ===
==== Qualifying rounds ====
30 July 2013 Third qualifying round 1st Leg	PSV Eindhoven (Netherlands)	2 – 0	(Belgium) Zulte Waregem	Eindhoven, Netherlands
20:45 CEST (UTC+2)	Memphis 61'; Locadia 75'	Report		Stadium: Philips Stadion; Attendance: 35,000; Referee: Luca Banti (Italy)

7 August 2013 Third qualifying round 2nd Leg	Zulte Waregem (Belgium)	0 – 3 (0 – 5 agg.)	(Netherlands) PSV Eindhoven	Anderlecht, Belgium
20:45 CEST (UTC+2)	Colpaert (red card) 56'	Report	Matavž 56' (pen.); Bakkali 73'; Godeau 90' (o.g.)	Stadium: Constant Vanden Stock Stadium; Attendance: 6,189; Referee: Felix Zwayer (Germany)

20 August 2013 Play-off round 1st Leg	PSV Eindhoven (Netherlands)	1 – 1	(Italy) Milan	Eindhoven, Netherlands
20:45 CEST (UTC+2)	Matavž 60'	Report	El Shaarawy 15'	Stadium: Philips Stadion; Attendance: 35,000; Referee: Cüneyt Çakır (Turkey)

28 August 2013 Play-off round 2nd Leg	Milan (Italy)	3 – 0 (4 – 1 agg.)	(Netherlands) PSV Eindhoven	Milan, Italy
20:45 CEST (UTC+2)	Boateng 9', 77'; Balotelli 55'	Report		Stadium: San Siro; Attendance: 51,598; Referee: Mark Clattenburg (England)

=== UEFA Europa League ===
==== Group stage ====
Pos	Team	Pld	W	D	L	GF	GA	GD	Pts	Qualification
1	(Bulgaria) Ludogorets Razgrad	6	5	1	0	11	2	+9	16	Advance to knockout phase
2	(Ukraine) Chornomorets Odesa	6	3	1	2	6	6	0	10	Advance to knockout phase
3	(Netherlands) PSV Eindhoven	6	2	1	3	4	5	−1	7	
4	(Croatia) Dinamo Zagreb	6	0	1	5	3	11	−8	1	

Source: Soccerway

19 September 2013 1	PSV Eindhoven (Netherlands)	0 – 2	(Bulgaria) Ludogorets Razgrad	Eindhoven, Netherlands
19:00 CEST (UTC+2)		Report	Bezjak 60'; Misidjan 74'	Stadium: Philips Stadion; Attendance: 11,000; Referee: Ivan Kružliak (Slovakia)

3 October 2013 2	Chornomorets Odesa (Ukraine)	0 – 2	(Netherlands) PSV Eindhoven	Odesa, Ukraine
21:05 CEST (UTC+2)		Report	Memphis 13'; Jozefzoon 88'	Stadium: Chornomorets Stadium; Attendance: 33,839; Referee: Liran Liany (Israel)

24 October 2013 3	Dinamo Zagreb (Croatia)	0 – 0	(Netherlands) PSV Eindhoven	Zagreb, Croatia
21:05 CEST (UTC+2)		Report		Stadium: Stadion Maksimir; Attendance: 75; Referee: Paweł Gil (Poland)

7 November 2013 4	PSV Eindhoven (Netherlands)	2 – 0	(Croatia) Dinamo Zagreb	Eindhoven, Netherlands
19:00 CET (UTC+1)	Maher 29'; Toivonen 57'	Report		Stadium: Philips Stadion; Attendance: 10,500; Referee: Cristian Balaj (Romania)

28 November 2013 5	Ludogorets Razgrad (Bulgaria)	2 – 0	(Netherlands) PSV Eindhoven	Sofia, Bulgaria
21:05 CET (UTC+1)	Bezjak 38', 79'	Report	Bruma (yellow card) 40' (yellow-red card) 55'	Stadium: Vasil Levski National Stadium; Attendance: 3,012; Referee: Nicola Rizzoli (Italy)

12 December 2013 6	PSV Eindhoven (Netherlands)	0 – 1	(Ukraine) Chornomorets Odesa	Eindhoven, Netherlands
19:00 CET (UTC+1)		Report	Dja Djédjé 59'; Riera (red card) 87'	Stadium: Philips Stadion; Attendance: 13,500; Referee: Carlos Clos Gómez (Spain)

== Squad statistics ==
=== Appearances and goals ===
No.	Pos	Nat	Player	Total		Eredivisie		KNVB Cup		Champions League		Europa League	
No.	Pos	Nat	Player	Apps	Goals	Apps	Goals	Apps	Goals	Apps	Goals	Apps	Goals
1	GK	(Poland) POL	Przemysław Tytoń	10	0	5+1	0	1	0	0	0	3	0
2	DF	(Denmark) DEN	Mathias Jørgensen	14	0	3+6	0	0	0	0	0	2+3	0
3	DF	(Netherlands) NED	Karim Rekik	31	1	25	1	0	0	4	0	2	0
5	DF	(Netherlands) NED	Jeffrey Bruma	42	4	31	4	2	0	4	0	5	0
6	MF	(Netherlands) NED	Adam Maher	37	3	20+6	3	0+1	0	4	0	6	0
8	MF	(Netherlands) NED	Stijn Schaars	38	0	26+1	0	2	0	4	0	4+1	0
9	FW	(Slovenia) SLO	Tim Matavž	22	4	7+8	2	1	0	4	2	1+1	0
10	MF	(Netherlands) NED	Georginio Wijnaldum	15	4	9+2	4	0	0	4	0	0	0
11	FW	(Netherlands) NED	Jürgen Locadia	41	17	26+5	13	1+1	3	0+3	1	5	0
13	DF	(Colombia) COL	Santiago Arias	32	1	25	1	1	0	0	0	6	0
14	FW	(Netherlands) NED	Florian Jozefzoon	25	4	3+13	2	1	1	0+4	0	1+3	1
15	DF	(Netherlands) NED	Jetro Willems	39	4	29	4	1	0	4	0	5	0
17	FW	(Netherlands) NED	Luciano Narsingh	24	0	8+12	0	1	0	0	0	3	0
19	FW	(Belgium) BEL	Zakaria Bakkali	24	4	7+9	3	1+1	0	2	1	2+2	0
20	MF	(Netherlands) NED	Peter van Ooijen	1	0	0+1	0	0	0	0	0	0	0
21	GK	(Netherlands) NED	Jeroen Zoet	36	0	29	0	0	0	4	0	3	0
22	FW	(Netherlands) NED	Memphis Depay	43	14	32	12	1	0	4	1	6	1
23	FW	(Costa Rica) CRC	Bryan Ruiz	14	5	13+1	5	0	0	0	0	0	0
26	DF	(Netherlands) NED	Joshua Brenet	17	1	10+2	0	1	1	4	0	0	0
27	MF	(Sweden) SWE	Oscar Hiljemark	36	2	21+6	2	2	0	0+2	0	2+3	0
28	DF	(Netherlands) NED	Abel Tamata	9	0	4+3	0	1	0	0	0	0+1	0
29	DF	(Netherlands) NED	Jorrit Hendrix	27	0	13+7	0	2	0	0	0	5	0
31	GK	(Netherlands) NED	Nigel Bertrams	1	0	0	0	1	0	0	0	0	0
33	MF	(South Korea) KOR	Park Ji-Sung	27	2	21+2	2	0	0	2	0	0+2	0
Players away from PSV on loan:
Players who appeared for PSV no longer at the club:
4	DF	(Brazil) BRA	Marcelo	1	0	0	0	0	0	0+1	0	0	0
7	FW	(Sweden) SWE	Ola Toivonen	23	2	7+7	1	2	0	0+1	0	5+1	1

=== Goal scorers ===
Place	Position	Nation	Number	Name	Eredivisie	KNVB Cup	Champions League	Europa League	Total
1	FW	(Netherlands)	11	Jürgen Locadia	13	3	1	0	17
2	FW	(Netherlands)	22	Memphis Depay	12	0	1	1	14
3	DF	(Costa Rica)	23	Bryan Ruiz	5	0	0	0	5
4	MF	(Netherlands)	10	Georginio Wijnaldum	4	0	0	0	4
4	DF	(Netherlands)	15	Jetro Willems	4	0	0	0	4
4	DF	(Netherlands)	5	Jeffrey Bruma	4	0	0	0	4
4	MF	(Belgium)	19	Zakaria Bakkali	3	0	1	0	4
4	MF	(Netherlands)	6	Adam Maher	3	0	0	1	4
4	MF	(Netherlands)	14	Florian Jozefzoon	2	1	0	1	4
4	FW	(Slovenia)	9	Tim Matavž	2	0	2	0	4
11	MF	(Sweden)	27	Oscar Hiljemark	2	0	0	0	2
11	MF	(South Korea)	33	Park Ji-Sung	2	0	0	0	2
11	FW	(Sweden)	7	Ola Toivonen	1	0	0	1	2
11				Own goal	1	0	1	0	2
15	DF	(Netherlands)	3	Karim Rekik	1	0	0	0	1
15	FW	(Colombia)	13	Santiago Arias	1	0	0	0	1
15	DF	(Netherlands)	26	Joshua Brenet	0	1	0	0	1
				TOTALS	60	5	5	4	74

=== Disciplinary record ===
Number	Nation	Position	Name	Eredivisie		KNVB Cup		Champions League		Europa League		Total	
Number	Nation	Position	Name	Yellow card	Red card	Yellow card	Red card	Yellow card	Red card	Yellow card	Red card	Yellow card	Red card
2	(Denmark)	DF	Mathias Jørgensen	1	0	0	0	0	0	0	0	1	0
3	(Netherlands)	DF	Karim Rekik	7	0	0	0	1	0	1	0	9	0
5	(Netherlands)	DF	Jeffrey Bruma	9	1	0	0	1	0	3	1	13	2
6	(Netherlands)	MF	Adam Maher	1	0	0	0	1	0	1	0	3	0
7	(Sweden)	FW	Ola Toivonen	1	0	0	0	0	0	2	0	3	0
8	(Netherlands)	MF	Stijn Schaars	4	0	1	0	1	0	1	0	7	0
9	(Slovenia)	FW	Tim Matavž	1	0	0	0	0	0	0	0	1	0
10	(Netherlands)	MF	Georginio Wijnaldum	1	0	0	0	0	0	0	0	1	0
11	(Netherlands)	FW	Jürgen Locadia	2	0	0	0	0	0	0	0	2	0
13	(Colombia)	DF	Santiago Arias	5	0	1	0	0	0	1	0	7	0
14	(Netherlands)	FW	Florian Jozefzoon	2	0	0	0	0	0	0	0	2	0
15	(Netherlands)	DF	Jetro Willems	5	0	1	0	1	0	0	0	7	0
19	(Netherlands)	FW	Zakaria Bakkali	1	0	0	0	0	0	1	0	2	0
22	(Belgium)	FW	Memphis Depay	3	1	0	0	0	0	1	0	4	1
27	(Sweden)	MF	Oscar Hiljemark	2	0	0	0	0	0	0	0	2	0
29	(Netherlands)	DF	Jorrit Hendrix	1	0	0	0	0	0	0	0	1	0
33	(South Korea)	MF	Park Ji-Sung	1	0	0	0	0	0	0	0	1	0
			TOTALS	47	2	3	0	5	0	11	1	66	3
