= Jetro Willems =

Dutch footballer (born 1994)

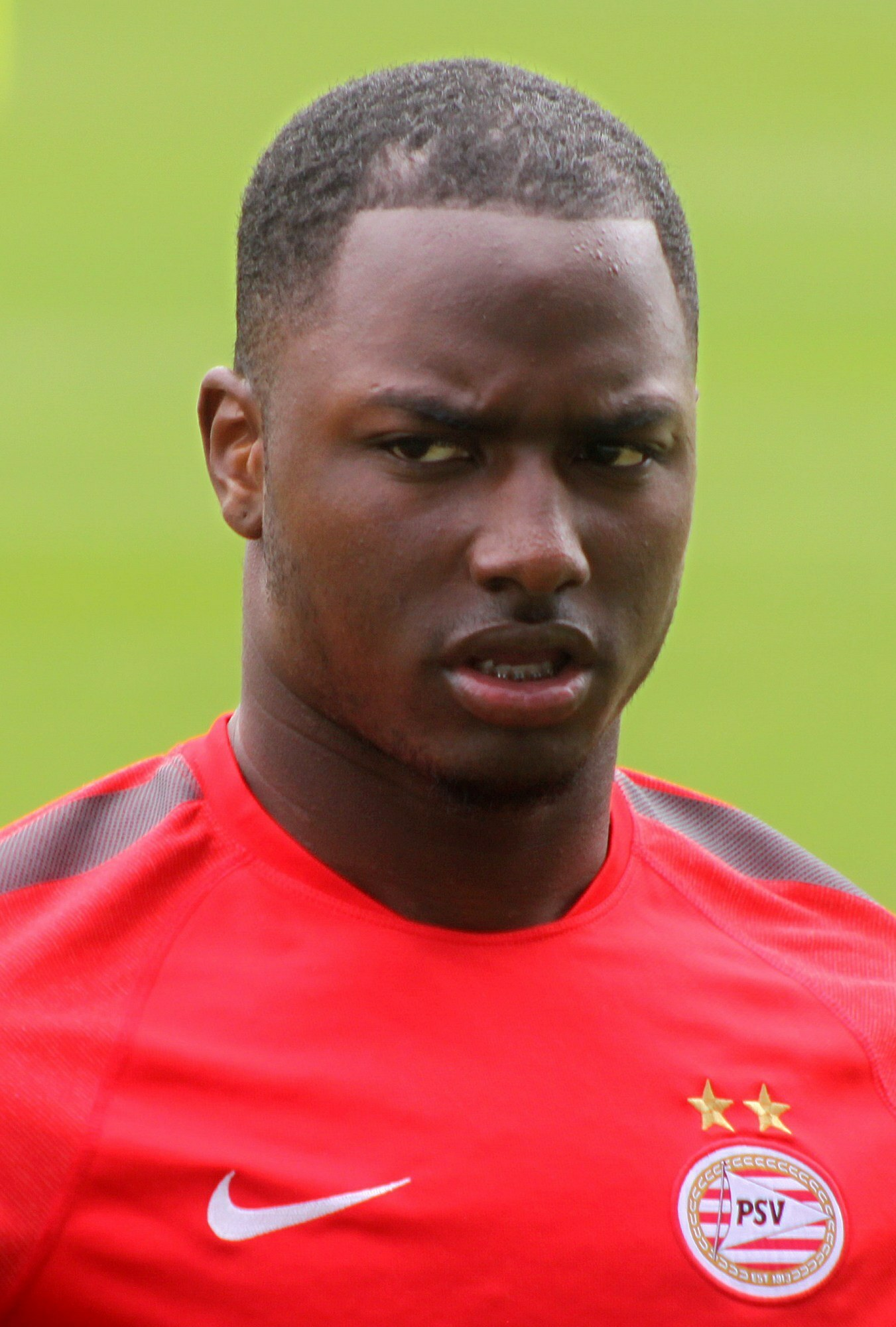
- Willems training with PSV Eindhoven in 2014

Personal information
- Full name: Jetro Danovich Sexer Willems
- Date of birth: 30 March 1994 (age 32)
- Place of birth: Willemstad, Curaçao
- Height: 1.69 m (5 ft 7 in)
- Positions: Left-back; left wing-back

Youth career
- Spartaan'20
- Sparta Rotterdam

Senior career*
Years	Team	Apps	(Gls)
2010–2011	Sparta Rotterdam	16	(0)
2011–2017	PSV	144	(11)
2017–2021	Eintracht Frankfurt	46	(0)
2019–2020	→ Newcastle United (loan)	19	(2)
2021–2022	Greuther Fürth	25	(1)
2023	Groningen	7	(0)
2023–2024	Heracles Almelo	20	(0)
2024–2025	Castellón	20	(1)
2025–2026	NEC	6	(0)

International career
2010–2011	Netherlands U17	15	(0)
2011	Netherlands U19	2	(0)
2013–2014	Netherlands U21	5	(0)
2012–2016	Netherlands	22	(0)
Medal record
Men's football
Representing Netherlands
UEFA European Under-17 Championship
Winner	2011 Serbia
- * Club domestic league appearances and goals as of 21 May 2026

Jetro Danovich Sexer Willems (born 30 March 1994) is a Dutch professional footballer who plays as a left wing-back or left-back.

Willems represented the Netherlands national team at UEFA Euro 2012; he played in the Netherlands' opening match of the tournament at the age of 18 years and 71 days, making him the youngest player ever to play in the UEFA European Championship at the time. The record is now held by Spain's Lamine Yamal.

== Club career ==
=== Sparta Rotterdam ===
Willems began his career with amateur side Spartaan '20 from whom he joined Sparta Rotterdam. During his time with Sparta he progressed through the club's youth academy and made his senior debut on 16 January 2011, in a match against Go Ahead Eagles. He made 16 appearances in the Dutch second division.

=== PSV ===
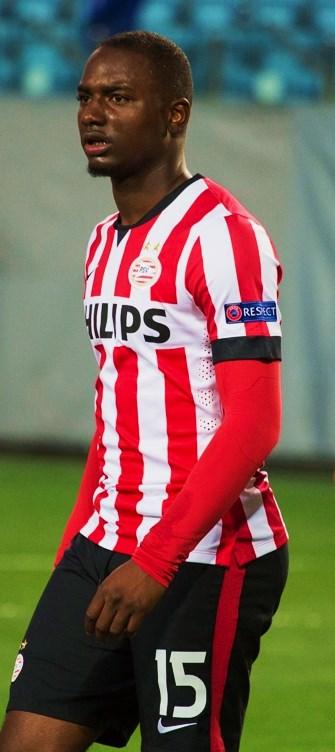
Willems playing for PSV Eindhoven in 2014

On 31 August 2011, Willems joined PSV Eindhoven on a three-year contract. He received the number 43 jersey and made his PSV debut on 23 October in a match against Vitesse. Willems became the youngest Dutchman to play in a UEFA competition when he started against Hapoel Tel Aviv on 3 November in a UEFA Europa League group stage match. That same month, he was permanently promoted to the first team squad.

In December, Willems was targeted for a move to Manchester United, with then United manager Sir Alex Ferguson looking for "the next Patrice Evra". On 3 April 2012, Willems' contract was upgraded and extended until 2016.

Willems scored his first professional – and PSV – goal on 22 April 2012 in a match against NEC. With this goal, he became the youngest goalscorer in the 2011–12 Eredivisie. He experienced a great amount of playing time in the 2011–12 season because full-back Erik Pieters was injured. Although being young and quite inexperienced, Willems quickly showed evidence of his raw talent, especially his technique and attacking traits.

On 15 July 2015, Willems suffered a serious injury and missed the first half of the 2015–16 season.

=== Eintracht Frankfurt ===
On 17 July 2017, Willems joined Bundesliga club Eintracht Frankfurt to replace Bastian Oczipka, who, in turn joined Schalke 04. The transfer fee paid to PSV was reported as between €5 million and €9 million, depending on the source. Willems made 29 appearances during the 2017–18 season, which included the surprise win over Bayern Munich in the German Cup final.

Willems started the 2018–19 season by starting in the German Super Cup.

==== 2019–20 season: Loan to Newcastle United ====
On 2 August 2019, Willems joined Newcastle United of the Premier League on a season-long loan deal with an option to buy. Willems scored his first goal for Newcastle and in the Premier League on 14 September, putting the Magpies into a shock lead at reigning UEFA Champions League winners Liverpool, but the side eventually fell to a 1–3 defeat. Willems then scored in a 2–2 draw with reigning league champions Manchester City on 30 November.

He was ever-present in the Newcastle side during the first half of the season and made 20 appearances for the Magpies, until he suffered a season ending injury when he tore his ACL in January 2020. He left the club when his loan expired on 1 July 2020.

Consequently, Willems returned to Frankfurt for the 2020-21 Bundesliga season. During the first half of the season, he continued his recovery from his knee injury. After almost a year of rehabilitation, Willems re-joined the group training of Eintracht Frankfurt at the beginning of 2021, but did not make any appearances for the rest of the season. Willems left Eintracht Frankfurt after his contract expired at the end of the season. In total, he made 65 appearances for the club.

=== Greuther Fürth ===
In August 2021, Willems signed a two-year contract with newly promoted Bundesliga side Greuther Fürth and has been given the number 15 jersey. He left the club on 1 September 2022, after his contract was terminated.

=== Groningen ===
On 23 February 2023, Willems joined Eredivisie club Groningen on a contract until the end of the season.

=== Heracles Almelo ===
On 14 June 2023, Willems signed a one-year contract with Heracles Almelo, with an option for the second year.

=== Castellón ===
On 25 July 2024, Willems signed for Spanish Segunda División side Castellón, after a trial period.

=== NEC ===
On 26 June 2025, Willems agreed to return to Eredivisie and signed a one-season contract with NEC.

== International career ==
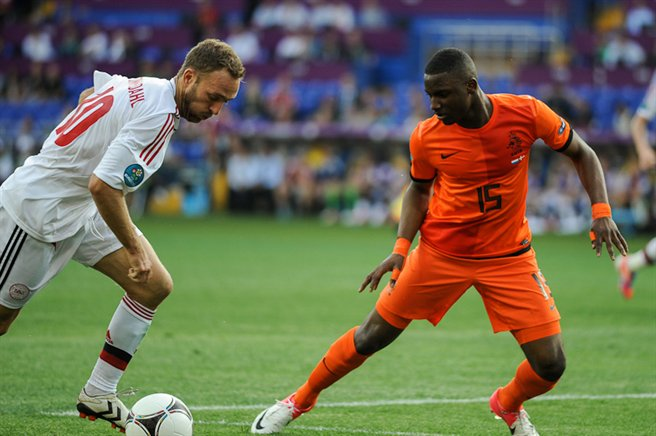
Willems playing for the Netherlands at UEFA Euro 2012

In 2011, Willems won the 2011 UEFA European Under-17 Championship with the Netherlands under-17 team. While being selected for the under-19 squad, on 7 May 2012 Willems was named in the provisional list of 36 players for UEFA Euro 2012, one of nine uncapped players to be chosen by senior team manager Bert van Marwijk as part of the preliminary squad. He was still in the Oranje squad for Euro 2012 after Van Marwijk had made a first cut to 27 players on 15 May 2012. Willems also made the final cut into the 23-man squad, being given the number 15 shirt. He made his first unofficial appearance for the senior national team on 22 May 2012 in a friendly match against Bayern Munich.

On 26 May 2012, Willems made his first appearance with the senior Dutch side in a match against Bulgaria.

At the Euro 2012, Willems made his first start for the Netherlands, against Denmark, becoming the youngest ever player to play at the Euros and the fourth-youngest player to play for the Netherlands, at 18 years and 71 days of age. The record was previously held by Belgian Enzo Scifo, at 18 years and 115 days. He featured in all the group stage games, however the Netherlands were eliminated from the tournament after losing all three group stage matches.

== Career statistics ==
=== Club ===
As of match played on 22 March 2026

Appearances and goals by club, season and competition
Club	Season	League			National Cup		Continental		Other		Total	
Club	Season	Division	Apps	Goals	Apps	Goals	Apps	Goals	Apps	Goals	Apps	Goals
Sparta Rotterdam	2010–11	Eerste Divisie	13	0	0	0	—		—		12	0
Sparta Rotterdam	2011–12	Eerste Divisie	3	0	0	0	—		—		3	0
Sparta Rotterdam	Total		16	0	0	0	0	0	0	0	16	0
PSV	2011–12	Eredivisie	20	1	3	0	6 (Note: Appearances in UEFA Europa League)	0	—		29	1
PSV	2012–13	Eredivisie	26	0	3	0	4	0	1 (Note: Appearance in Johan Cruyff Shield)	0	34	0
PSV	2013–14	Eredivisie	28	4	1	0	9 (Note: Appearances in UEFA Champions League, appearances in UEFA Europa League)	0	—		38	4
PSV	2014–15	Eredivisie	30	2	3	1	8	0	—		41	3
PSV	2015–16	Eredivisie	15	2	1	0	1 (Note: Appearance(s) in UEFA Champions League)	0	—		17	2
PSV	2016–17	Eredivisie	24	2	1	0	5	0	1	0	31	2
PSV	Total		143	11	12	1	33	0	2	0	190	12
Eintracht Frankfurt	2017–18	Bundesliga	23	0	6	0	—		—		29	0
Eintracht Frankfurt	2018–19	Bundesliga	22	0	1	0	11	0	1 (Note: Appearance in DFL-Supercup)	0	35	0
Eintracht Frankfurt	2020–21	Bundesliga	0	0	0	0	—		—		0	0
Eintracht Frankfurt	Total		45	0	7	0	11	0	1	0	64	0
Newcastle United (loan)	2019–20	Premier League	19	2	0	0	—		1 (Note: Appearance in EFL Cup)	0	20	2
Greuther Fürth	2021–22	Bundesliga	24	1	—		—		—		24	1
Greuther Fürth	2022–23	2. Bundesliga	1	0	1	0	—		—		2	0
Greuther Fürth	Total		25	1	1	0	—		—		26	1
Groningen	2022–23	Eredivisie	7	0	—		—		—		7	0
Heracles Almelo	2023–24	Eredivisie	20	0	1	0	—		—		21	0
Castellón	2024–25	Segunda División	20	1	0	0	—		—		20	1
NEC	2025–26	Eredivisie	6	0	3	0	—		—		9	0
Career total			301	14	24	1	44	0	4	0	372	16

=== International ===
Appearances and goals by national team and year
National team	Year	Apps	Goals
Netherlands	2012	8	0
Netherlands	2013	3	0
Netherlands	2014	2	0
Netherlands	2015	3	0
Netherlands	2016	6	0
Total		22	0

== Honours ==
PSV

- Eredivisie: 2014–15, 2015–16
- KNVB Cup: 2011–12
- Johan Cruyff Shield: 2012, 2016

Eintracht Frankfurt

- DFB-Pokal: 2017–18

Netherlands U17

- UEFA European Under-17 Championship: 2011
