= Ruud Swinkels =

Dutch footballer

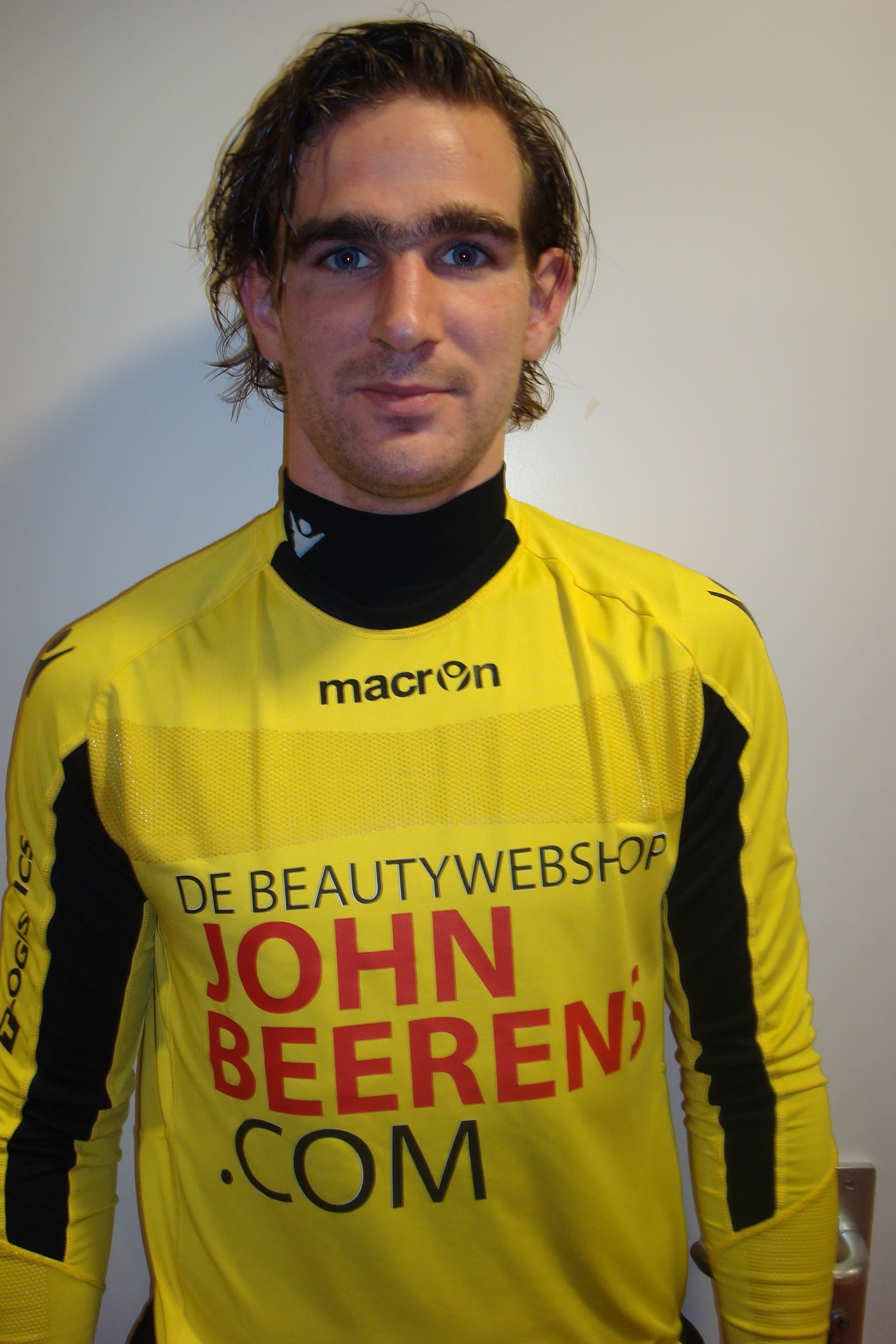

Personal information
- Date of birth: 23 February 1987 (age 39)
- Place of birth: Moergestel, Netherlands
- Height: 1.80 m (5 ft 11 in)
- Position: Goalkeeper

Team information
- Current team: Esperanza Pelt
- Number: 20

Youth career
- Audacia
- SC 't Zand
- SV Triborgh
- UNA
- Willem II

Senior career*
Years	Team	Apps	(Gls)
2009–2012	FC Eindhoven	86	(0)
2012	PSV	0	(0)
2013	SC Cambuur	0	(0)
2013–2014	Willem II	35	(0)
2015	Witgoor Sport Dessel		
2015–2021	FC Eindhoven	190	(0)
2021–	Esperanza Pelt		
- * Club domestic league appearances and goals as of 30 July 2021

Ruud Swinkels (born 23 February 1987) is a Dutch professional footballer who plays as a goalkeeper for Esperanza Pelt in the Belgian fifth-tier Belgian Division 3. He formerly played for FC Eindhoven, PSV, SC Cambuur, Willem II and Witgoor Sport Dessel.

== Career ==
Swinkels started his professional career with FC Eindhoven in the Dutch Eerste Divisie, where he was the first goalkeeper for three years. In the summer of 2012, Swinkels moved to PSV, where he was the third goalkeeper. He was released on 31 December 2012. In June 2013, Swinkels signed for two seasons with SC Cambuur, which promoted to the Eredivisie. However, Cambuur and Swinkels agreed to dissolve his contract with the club on 12 August 2013. Swinkels lost the competition of fellow goalkeeper Leonard Nienhuis and refused to spend the season as the second goalkeeper.

On 30 July 2021, he joined Belgian club Esperanza Pelt.

== Honours ==
=== Club ===
Willem II

- Eerste Divisie (1): 2013–14
