= Gianluca Maria =

Dutch footballer

Personal information
- Full name: Gianluca Gianenni Maradona Maria
- Date of birth: 28 June 1992 (age 34)
- Place of birth: Venray, Netherlands
- Height: 1.75 m (5 ft 9 in)
- Position: Winger

Youth career
- NEC
- PSV

Senior career*
Years	Team	Apps	(Gls)
2012–2013	PSV	0	(0)
2012–2013	→ FC Eindhoven (loan)	12	(3)
2013–2014	MVV Maastricht	28	(1)
2015	RKC Waalwijk	11	(2)
2015–2016	Hapoel Ashkelon	4	(0)
2016–2017	JVC Cuijk	11	(3)
2017–2019	SV TEC	33	(4)
2020–2021	Esperanza Pelt		
2021–2022	Achilles '29	9	(2)

International career
2014–2016	Curaçao	10	(1)
- * Club domestic league appearances and goals as of 15:24, 7 April 2023 (UTC)

Gianluca Gianenni Maradona Maria is a Curaçaoan international footballer. as a winger.

== Career ==
Maria started his career with PSV Eindhoven. In the 2012–13 season he played on loan for FC Eindhoven in the Dutch Eerste Divisie. He signed with MVV Maastricht in July 2013. On 6 January 2015, it was announced that Maria had signed with RKC Waalwijk, after his contract with MVV Maastricht had been dissolved on 1 January 2015.
