= Memphis Depay =

Dutch footballer and musician (born 1994)

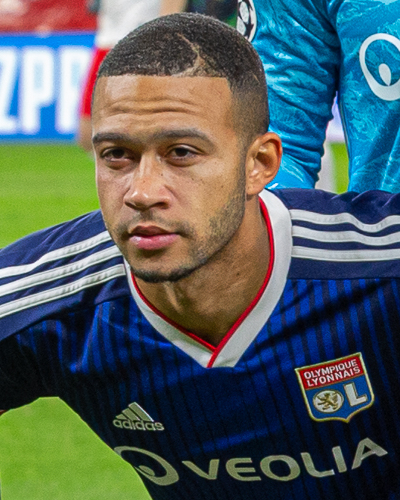
- Memphis with Lyon in 2019

Personal information
- Full name: Memphis Depay
- Date of birth: 13 February 1994 (age 32)
- Place of birth: Moordrecht, Netherlands
- Height: 1.78 m (5 ft 10 in)
- Position: Forward

Team information
- Current team: Corinthians
- Number: 10

Youth career
- 2000–2003: Moordrecht
- 2003–2006: Sparta Rotterdam
- 2006–2011: PSV Eindhoven

Senior career*
Years	Team	Apps	(Gls)
2011–2015	PSV Eindhoven	90	(39)
2015–2017	Manchester United	33	(2)
2017–2021	Lyon	139	(63)
2021–2023	Barcelona	30	(13)
2023–2024	Atlético Madrid	31	(9)
2024–	Corinthians	66	(16)

International career^{‡}
2008	Netherlands U15	4	(2)
2009	Netherlands U16	6	(2)
2010–2011	Netherlands U17	17	(8)
2011–2013	Netherlands U19	8	(7)
2013	Netherlands U21	7	(0)
2013–	Netherlands	112	(55)
Medal record
Representing Netherlands
FIFA World Cup
Bronze medal – third place	2014 Brazil	Team
UEFA European Championship
Bronze medal – third place	2024 Germany	Team
UEFA Nations League
Runner-up	2019 Portugal
UEFA European Under-17 Championship
Winner	2011 Serbia	Team
- * Club domestic league appearances and goals as of 03:59, 18 November 2026 (UTC) ‡ National team caps and goals as of 02:30, 26 June 2026 (UTC)

Memphis Depay (Dutch pronunciation: [ˈmɛɱfɪz dəˈpɑi]; born 13 February 1994), better known mononymously as Memphis, is a Dutch professional footballer who plays as a forward for Campeonato Brasileiro Série A club Corinthians and the Netherlands national team.

Memphis began his professional career with PSV Eindhoven, where, under the influence of manager Phillip Cocu, he became an integral part of the team, scoring a total of 56 goals in 124 games across all competitions! During the 2014–15 season, he was the Eredivisie's top scorer with 22 goals in 30 games, and helped the team win the Eredivisie title for the first time since 2008. He also won the Dutch Footballer of the Year for his performances during the season. His performances also led him to be named the "Best Young Player" in the world in 2015 by France Football. Memphis joined English side Manchester United in June 2015 for a reported fee of £25 million.

After a spell in England, he joined French club Lyon in January 2016 product of the Royal Dutch Football Association (KNVB) institution, Memphis has represented the national team at every professional level from early developmental stages under the tutelage of iconic Dutch coaches and players alike. He was part of the Netherlands under-17 team which won the 2011 European Championship. He made his senior debut in 2013 and the following year was part of their squad that came third at the 2014 FIFA World Cup, where he made his breakthrough performances on the international stage. He also took part in UEFA Euro 2020, the 2022 World Cup, Euro 2024 and the 2026 World Cup. He is the all-time top scorer for the national team with 55 goals. In addition to his football career, Memphis is also a musician.

== Early life ==
Memphis Depay was born in the small South Holland village of Moordrecht to a Ghanaian father, Dennis Depay, and a Dutch mother, Cora Schensema. It was not long, however, before the relationship between the two parents began to fall apart and when Memphis was four, his father walked out on the family.

Since 2012, Memphis has dropped his last name to sever ties with his father: as he has remarked earlier, "Do not call me Depay, call me Memphis."

== Club career ==
=== PSV Eindhoven ===
Memphis impressed football scouts from Sparta Rotterdam at the age of eight on the fields of his boyhood club Moordrecht. It took only three seasons before scouts from Sparta snatched Memphis from his local club. Club chairman Ton Redegeld said, "Memphis was as a young player already complete. He was two-footed and strong. If we won 7–0, he scored five times and would assist two times". When he turned 12, Memphis caught the eye of clubs such as Ajax, PSV Eindhoven and Feyenoord. His grandfather, despite being an Ajax fan himself, advised Memphis to move to PSV.

==== 2011–13: Beginnings ====
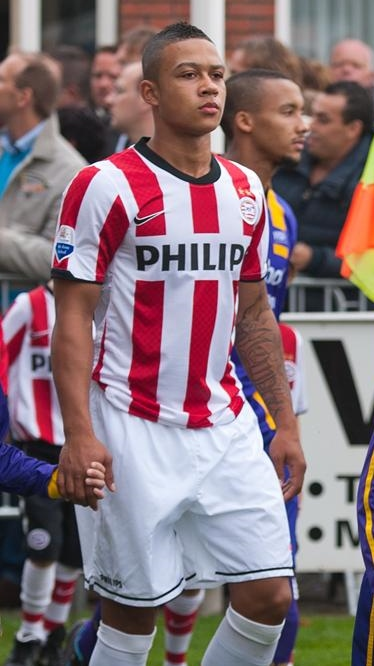
Memphis with PSV Eindhoven in 2011

In 2011, Memphis was on trial for PSV's first team while playing for Jong PSV, the club's reserve team. He made his official debut on 21 September 2011 in a KNVB Cup second round match against amateur side VVSB, opening an 8–0 away win. His first Eredivisie match was 26 February 2012, when PSV beat rivals Feyenoord 3–2 at the Philips Stadion, coming on in added time for Zakaria Labyad. On 18 March, six minutes after replacing Dries Mertens, he scored his first league goal to confirm a 5–1 win over Heerenveen. He made a total of eight league appearances in his first season, all as a substitute, scoring three goals.

Memphis featured in the 2012 KNVB Cup Final on 8 April, playing the final four minutes of the 3–0 win over Heracles in place of Mertens at De Kuip in Rotterdam under interim coach Phillip Cocu. On 29 June, Memphis signed his first professional contract with PSV, tying himself to the Boeren until 2017. On 5 August, Memphis featured in the 2012 Johan Cruyff Shield at the Amsterdam Arena, replacing Luciano Narsingh for the final six minutes as PSV defeated league champions Ajax 4–2. He made 20 Eredivisie appearances in his second season, scoring twice, including two starts. The first of these was on 2 March 2013 in a 2–0 home win over VVV-Venlo, scoring after three minutes after being set up by fellow teenager Jürgen Locadia. PSV again reached the cup final, losing 1–2 to AZ Alkmaar on 9 May, with Memphis playing five minutes in place of Mertens.

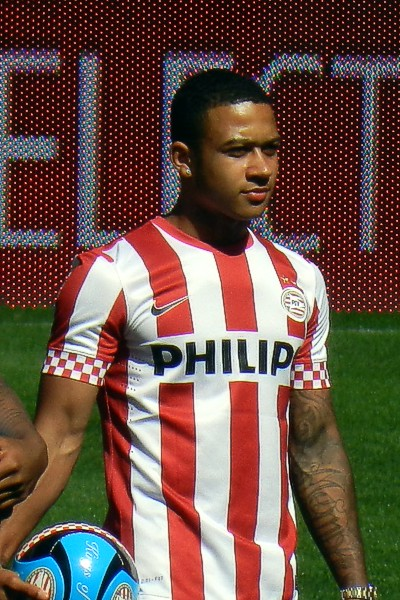
Memphis with PSV Eindhoven in 2012

==== 2013–14: Breakthrough season ====
Memphis scored his first goal in UEFA competition on 30 July 2013, when he drifted in from the left and then smashed the ball into the top corner past goalkeeper Sammy Bossut as PSV defeated Zulte Waregem 2–0 in the first leg of their UEFA Champions League third qualifying round tie. PSV failed to qualify for the group stage of the Champions League, but in its second group stage match in the Europa League, Memphis scored again in a 2–0 win against Chornomorets Odesa on 3 October. Memphis provided the assist for Tim Matavž's goal against Roda JC on 27 October, but picked up two second-half yellow cards and was sent off for the first time in his professional career as PSV lost 2–1. On 15 December, Memphis helped PSV to just their second win in 13 matches, scoring twice in a 5–1 win over Utrecht. Memphis helped PSV rack up their eighth win a row on 23 March 2014, a 3–1 win over Roda JC, having a hand in Bryan Ruiz's game-winning goal despite wearing a protective mask to cover a bruised eye socket suffered in a challenge with Renato Ibarra of Vitesse on 15 March.

Memphis helped PSV secure a place in European competition for the 41st consecutive year, edging the ball past goalkeeper Jelle ten Rouwelaar to score their first in a 2–0 win against Breda; the final day win ensured that the club would finish fourth in the Eredivisie table.

==== 2014–15: Top scorer and league title ====
After a successful showing at the 2014 World Cup, Memphis was linked to a number of clubs, including Chelsea, Manchester United and Tottenham Hotspur. Amid the speculation surrounding his future, he started the season for PSV in impressive fashion. Memphis came off the bench to score one goal and assist another in the return game of the UEFA Europa League third qualifying round tie between PSV and St. Pölten on 7 August, as his team progressed to the play-off round after a 3–2 away win, giving them a 4–2 aggregate win over the Austrians. In the opening game of the Eredivisie season three days later, Memphis played a major part in PSV's 3–1 away win against promoted side Willem II by scoring two goals. He improved on this performance in the following game, scoring two free-kicks and delivering the assist for Georginio Wijnaldum's goal in a 6–1 home win against Breda. On 28 August, in the Europa League play-off second leg away in Belarus, he scored two late goals against Shakhtyor Soligorsk as PSV won 3–0 on aggregate to reach the group stage. Memphis then suffered a groin injury during PSV's 1–3 defeat at Zwolle on 13 September and he was substituted in the 18th minute.

On 18 April 2015, Memphis scored PSV's second goal with a free-kick from 35 yards out in a 4–1 home win over Heerenveen to give PSV its 22nd Eredivisie title, its first since 2008. Later that month, the club confirmed that they had received interest from others wishing to sign him, including Manchester United. He scored his last home goal for PSV in a 2–0 win against Heracles on 10 May. As he was substituted off he received a standing ovation as well as congratulations from his teammates. He finished the season as the league's top scorer with 22 goals, two ahead of runner-up and teammate Luuk de Jong.

=== Manchester United ===
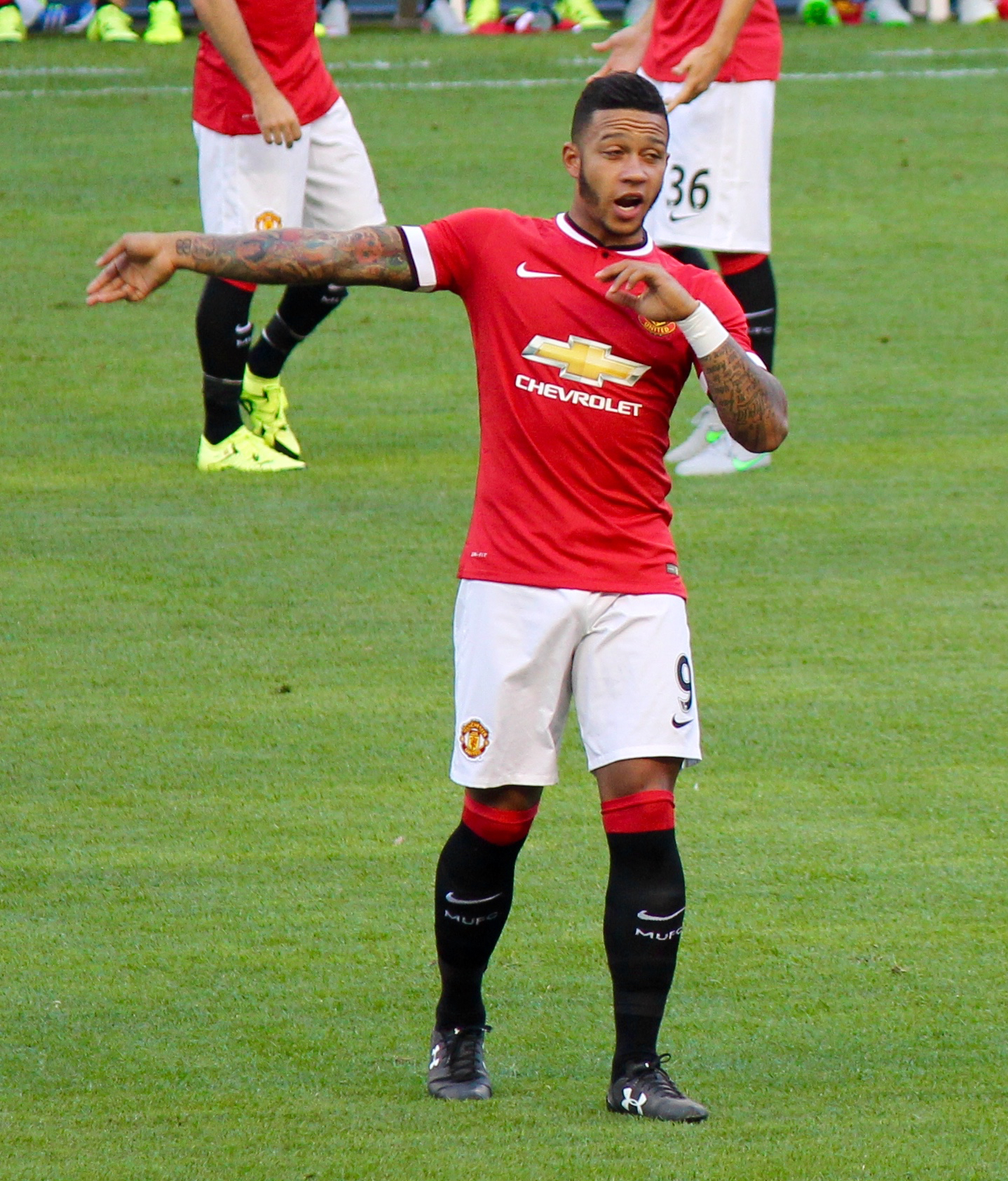
Memphis playing for Manchester United in 2015

On 7 May 2015, PSV confirmed that they had agreed a deal with Manchester United over Memphis' transfer, subject to a medical. United manager Louis van Gaal said that he was "forced" into signing him early, due to interest from Paris Saint-Germain. Though Liverpool manager Brendan Rodgers said that he had never been after Memphis, PSV director Marcel Brands stated that he had conversations with Liverpool over a possible transfer. On 12 June, United confirmed the signing of Memphis, for a reported fee of £25 million on a four-year contract with the option to extend for a further year. He was unveiled as a United player at a press conference on 10 July. This made him the fourth player to join United from PSV after Jaap Stam, Park Ji-sung and Ruud van Nistelrooy. Memphis made his debut in a pre-season friendly against Club América in Seattle on 17 July, contesting the first half as United fielded a different 11 players for each 45 minutes. He scored his first goal for the club four days later during a 3–1 win over the San Jose Earthquakes. At his own request, after the departure of Ángel Di María, Memphis was given the iconic number 7 shirt – previously worn by former players such as George Best, Bryan Robson, Eric Cantona, David Beckham and Cristiano Ronaldo.

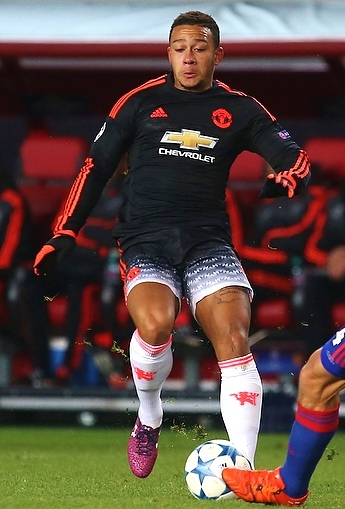
Memphis during a Champions League match against CSKA Moscow in 2015

Memphis made his Premier League debut on 8 August as the season opened with a 1–0 victory over Tottenham Hotspur at Old Trafford. He was substituted after 68 minutes for Ander Herrera, and Van Gaal said after the match that Memphis was playing in too eager a manner. On 18 August, Memphis scored his first two goals for Manchester United, and assisted Maroune Fellaini's final goal, in a 3–1 home victory over Club Brugge in the first leg of the Champions League play-offs. In the second leg, Memphis provided the assist for the first of Wayne Rooney's three goals. He scored again on 15 September in the first game of the competition's group stage, in an eventual 2–1 loss at his former team PSV. Memphis scored his first league goal on 26 September, opening a 3–0 home win over Sunderland, a victory that put United on top of the league for the first time in 110 weeks.

Following his early struggles in the Premier League, Memphis told Dutch newspaper De Telegraaf, "There are a lot of games in Manchester. There are very few rest days and on training days you are mainly concerned with recovering. It's heavy, two games a week, always at a high level, and my body has to get used to that". These claims were dismissed by assistant manager and former United player Ryan Giggs, who blamed Memphis' flashy lifestyle for his poor form. Memphis was later dropped to the bench, along with countryman Daley Blind, during United's 3–0 win over Everton on 17 October, following the Netherlands' failure to qualify for UEFA Euro 2016. Despite this, Memphis was named in the 59-man longlist for the FIFA Ballon d'Or, but did not make the shortlist.

After being dropped in four consecutive matches, Memphis got his first start as a second striker due to Anthony Martial and Rooney's unavailability, and seized the opportunity with his second league goal in a 2–1 away win over Watford at Vicarage Road. His performance earned praise from van Gaal, as well as his first Premier League Man of the Match honour.

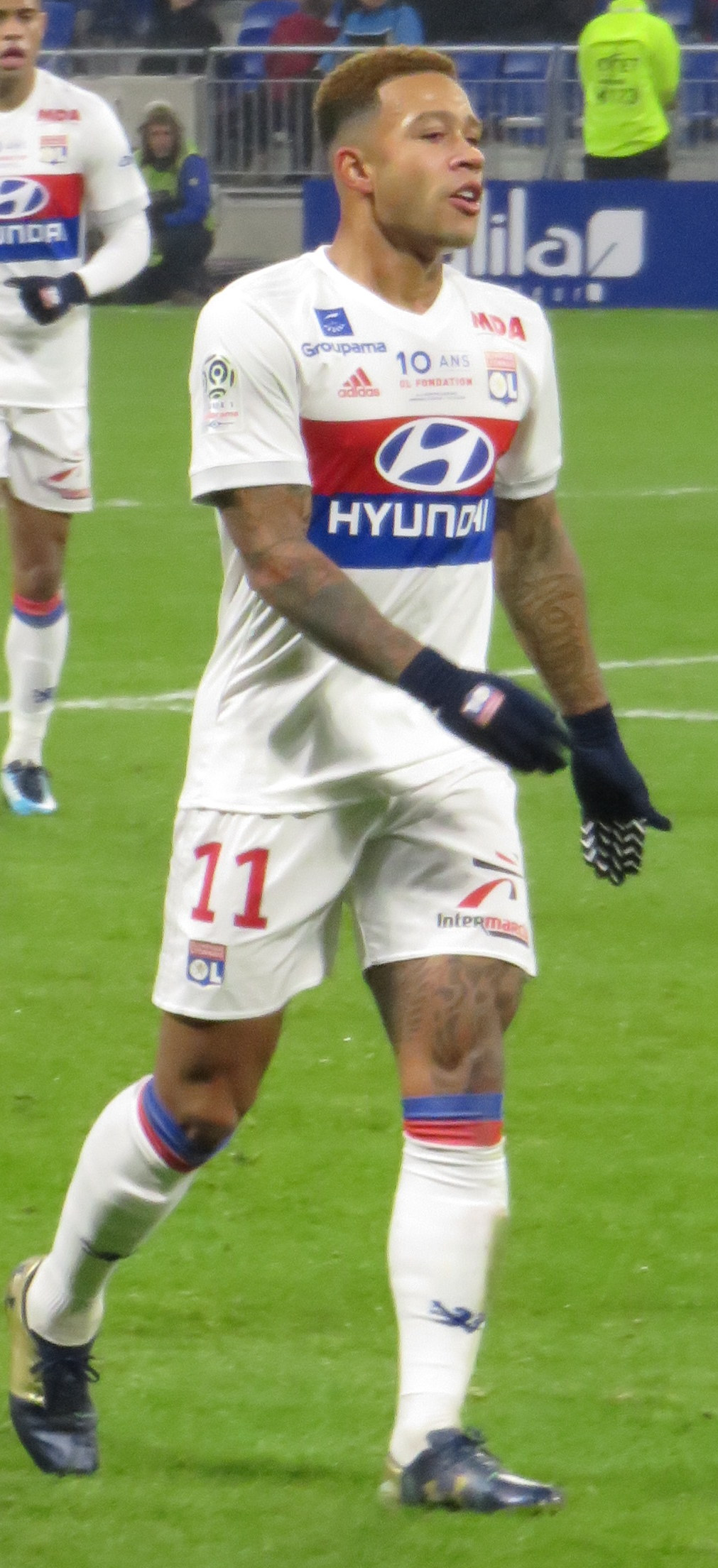
Memphis playing for Lyon in 2017

In February, Memphis scored in each of United's two Europa League matches against Midtjylland as they won 6–3 on aggregate; Memphis was lauded for his performance in the home leg, where he not only scored but also set up the first goal, earned his side two penalties and delivered a cross that led to an own goal. Van Gaal hailed the match as a "turning point" for Memphis.

Memphis made only four appearances (all of them as a substitute) and had a total playing time of just 20 minutes in the Premier League during the 2016–17 season. He only started one match in the season – the EFL Cup third round 3–1 away win over League One club Northampton Town on 21 September 2016 – and was substituted after playing 55 minutes of that match. Following this, he played only 46 minutes, and his last match for the club was on 24 November, when he played the final eight minutes of a 4–0 Europa League home victory against Feyenoord.

=== Lyon ===
On 20 January 2017, Memphis signed a four-and-a-half-year deal with French club Lyon which would keep him at the French club until the summer of 2021. The initial transfer fee was estimated to be £16–17 million, potentially rising to £22 million with the add-ons including Lyon qualifying for the UEFA Champions League and Memphis earning a new contract. The terms of the deal also included buy-back and sell-on clauses for United. Two days later, he made his debut for Lyon, coming on as substitute for Mathieu Valbuena in the 79th minute in a home Ligue 1 match against Marseille, which Lyon won 3–1. On 28 January, he made his first start for Lyon in a 2–1 league defeat to Lille, and was substituted in the 68th minute by Maxwel Cornet. On 12 March in a game against Toulouse, Memphis scored a goal from close to the halfway line. He later said it was "the goal of my life", although he also distanced himself from comparisons to David Beckham's famous halfway line goal against Wimbledon in 1996.

On the final day of the 2017–18 season, Memphis scored a hat-trick against Nice as Lyon won 3–2 and qualified for the Champions League.

On 5 November 2019, Memphis scored his fourth goal in as many games for Lyon against Benfica in a 3–1 win in the 2019–20 Champions League. On 10 December, he scored an equaliser against RB Leipzig in a 2–2 draw to help Lyon to qualify to the knockout phase, hence he scored in five consecutive matches in the competition. On 15 December, Memphis tore his anterior cruciate ligament while playing against Rennes in Ligue 1, ending a successful season during which he had scored nine goals in 12 league starts for Lyon. He returned from his injury to start for Lyon in their 5–6 penalty shootout loss in the French league cup final against Paris Saint-Germain on 31 July 2020.

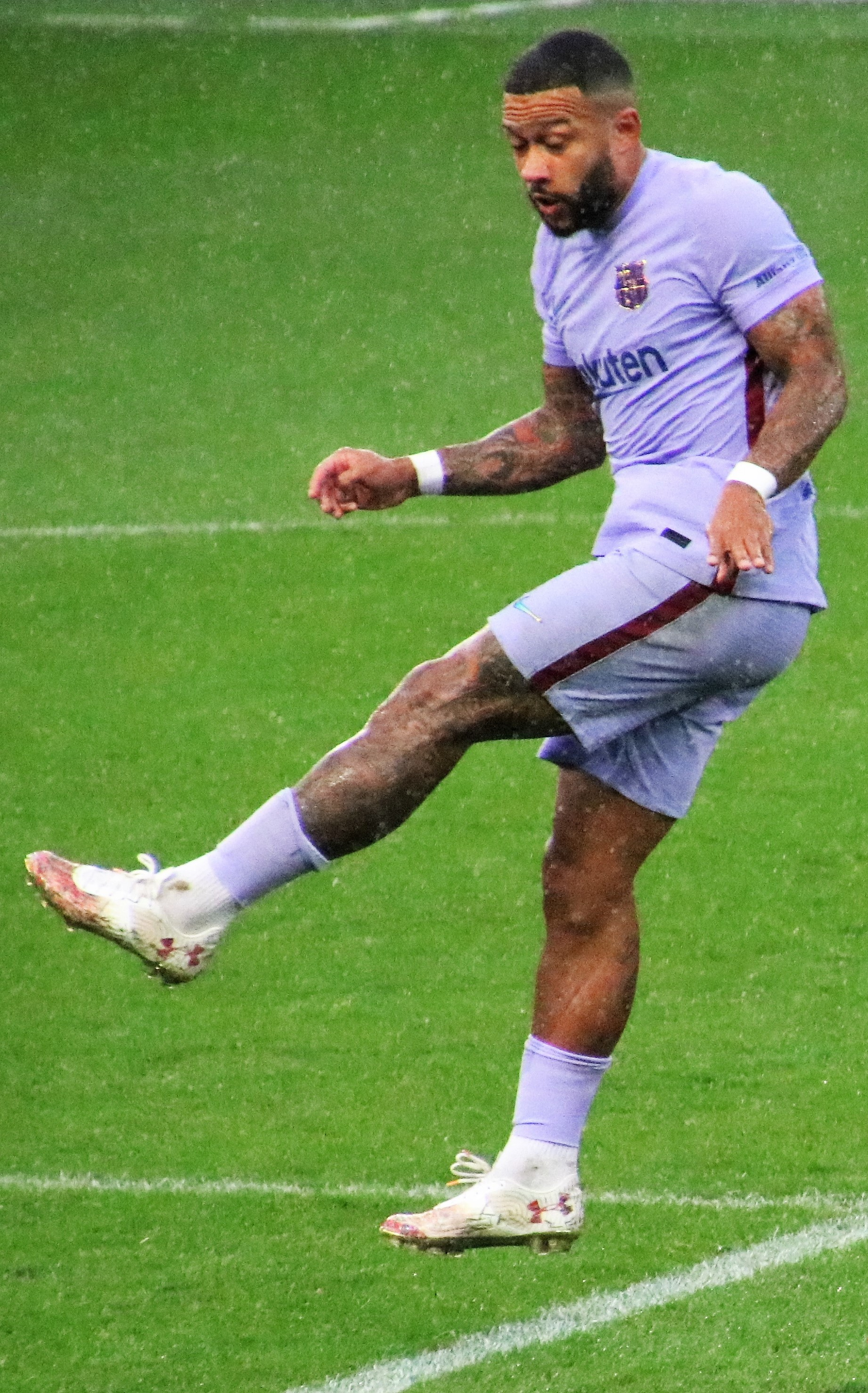
Memphis playing for Barcelona in 2021

On 7 August, Memphis scored in his sixth consecutive Champions League match, converting a penalty in a 2–1 loss to Juventus in the second leg of their round of 16 tie; he is only the second Dutch player to score in six straight Champions League games, following former Manchester United striker Ruud van Nistelrooy. The tie finished 2–2 on aggregate, but Lyon progressed on the away goals rule. Lyon eventually reached the semi-finals for the second time in their history since 2010 after defeating Manchester City.

On 28 August 2020, Memphis scored a hat-trick in a 4–1 win against Dijon, in the first match of the 2020–21 season.

=== Barcelona ===
On 19 June 2021, La Liga club Barcelona announced the free transfer of Memphis on a two-year contract. According to his grandmother, since the age of four, he had been aspiring to be a player for Barcelona. On 15 August, Memphis made his Barcelona debut in a 4–2 league victory against Real Sociedad at the Camp Nou. Six days later, he scored his first goal for the club in his second match when he scored the equaliser against Athletic Bilbao in a 1–1 draw.

=== Atlético Madrid ===
On 20 January 2023, Atlético Madrid announced the signing of Memphis on a two-and-a-half-year contract. The initial transfer fee was estimated to be over €4 million. On 12 February, he scored his first goal in a 1–0 away victory over Celta Vigo. On 13 March 2024, Memphis scored the winning goal in the 87th minute in a 2–1 victory over Inter Milan in the Champions League round of 16 second leg, which tied the encounter at 2–2 on aggregate; however, Atlético would later win 3–2 on penalties to advance to the quarterfinals. On 22 May 2024, Memphis Depay and Atlético de Madrid agreed to part ways.

=== Corinthians ===
On 9 September 2024, Brazilian side Corinthians announced the signing of Memphis on a two-year contract. He scored his first goal for the club on 18 October 2024 against Athletico Paranaense. On 4 December, he scored twice, which included a free-kick, and assisted Yuri Alberto, as Corinthians beat Bahia 3–0. That season, Memphis decisively helped a struggling Corinthians side avoid relegation in the Brasileirão.

On 16 March 2025, Memphis assisted Yuri Alberto in a 1–0 away victory over Palmeiras in the Paulista Championship final, helping the team secure the title and end a six-year long trophy drought. On 30 July, Memphis scored against rivals Palmeiras in the first leg of Copa do Brasil round of 16. On 10 December, he scored against the record winner Cruzeiro, helping Corinthians advance to the Copa do Brasil final, which was played against Vasco da Gama. After a scoreless home draw, Corinthians went on to face Vasco at the Maracanã, defeating them 2–1, with a goal by Memphis, and won the title for the fourth time in club history. On 1 February 2026, he featured in the Supercopa do Brasil, which ended in a 2–0 victory over Flamengo. By then, he had earned R$25.2 million in bonuses, while Corinthians reportedly owed him around R$30 million.

On 11 August 2026, Corinthians announced that they had decided not to renew Depay's contract. Depay subsequently accused the club of breaching a previously agreed contract extension, describing its conduct as "unacceptable" and saying he would take action to protect his interests. However, the dispute was resolved when Depay agreed to take a significant pay cut, reportedly waiving about R$21 million of the R$75 million owed to him, to remain at Corinthians until 2028.

== International career ==
=== Youth ===
Memphis played youth international football for the Netherlands at under-15, under-16, under-17, under-19 and under-21 levels. He was a member of the under-17 team which won the 2011 European Championship in Serbia. In the final against Germany in Novi Sad, he scored the goal which put the Netherlands ahead as they came from behind to defeat their rivals 5–2. Later that year, he participated in the 2011 FIFA U-17 World Cup held in Mexico.

=== Senior ===
Memphis made his international debut on 15 October 2013, coming on for Jeremain Lens in the last minute of a 2–0 away win against Turkey at the Şükrü Saracoğlu Stadium in World Cup qualification. Memphis was selected by Netherlands manager Louis van Gaal in the final 23-man squad for the 2014 FIFA World Cup in Brazil. He came on as a substitute before the half-time whistle in the second group match against Australia to replace defender Bruno Martins Indi, who had sustained a head injury, and in the 68th minute he scored the winning goal, a swerving effort from outside the box. He also set up Robin van Persie's equaliser. He became the youngest Dutchman to score a goal at the World Cup, at the age of 20 years and four months. He came on as a substitute again in the final group match against Chile on 23 June in São Paulo and scored the second goal for the Dutch, tapping in an Arjen Robben cross, as they clinched first place with a 2–0 victory.

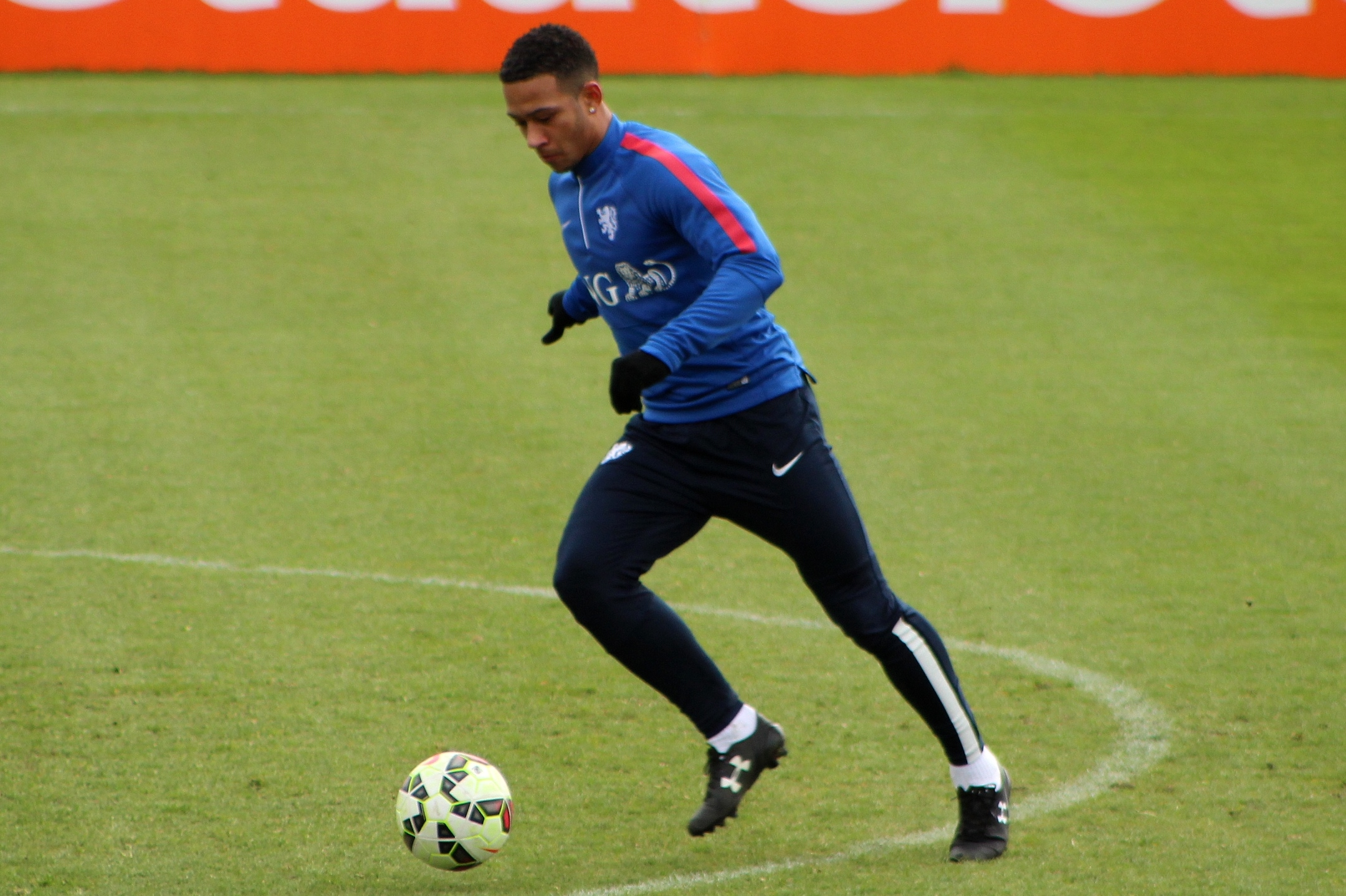
Memphis training with the Netherlands in March 2015

On 11 July, Memphis was named on the three-man shortlist for the tournament's Best Young Player award, together with Frenchmen Paul Pogba and Raphaël Varane, but lost out to Pogba.

Memphis' first goal since the World Cup came in a friendly at the Amsterdam Arena on 5 June 2015, deflecting Klaas-Jan Huntelaar's shot to put the Netherlands 3–1 up against the United States, although the team eventually lost 4–3. In October of that year, he was involved in a fight with teammate Robin van Persie at an international training camp; manager Danny Blind stated to the media, "There are sometimes situations in training where players think different. Then you talk about it. That's what happened and then it's over." The following month, both Memphis and Van Persie were dropped from the Dutch squad for friendlies against Wales and Germany, with Blind stating of Memphis, "In football you must function in a team. He doesn't always do that. That's something he has to learn."

Memphis was among the final 26 players selected by coach Frank de Boer to represent Netherlands in Euro 2020. He scored twice in four matches as Netherlands were eliminated in the round of 16 stage by Czech Republic.

On 7 September 2021, Memphis scored his first international hat-trick in a 2022 World Cup qualification 6–1 win over Turkey, reaching 33 goals and equaling Johan Cruyff's and Abe Lenstra's goalscoring tallies for the Netherlands.

Memphis scored a last-minute winner against Wales on 14 June 2022 in the UEFA Nations League, taking him to 42 international goals, level with Klaas-Jan Huntelaar.

In November 2022, he was named in the Dutch squad for the 2022 FIFA World Cup in Qatar. On 3 December, he scored a goal in a 3–1 win over the United States in the round of 16, to become the second all-time top scorer for his country with 43 goals, behind Robin van Persie's 50.

On 29 May 2024, Memphis was named in the Netherlands' squad for UEFA Euro 2024. On 23 March 2025, he played his 100th international match for the Netherlands, scoring a goal in a 3–3 away draw against Spain during the Nations League quarter-finals, which ultimately ended in a defeat on penalties.

On 10 June 2025, in a 2026 FIFA World Cup qualification game against Malta, he scored his 49th and 50th international goals, to become joint top goalscorer of Netherlands with Robin van Persie. He made the record his own when he opened the scoring against Lithuania on 7 September, taking him to 51 goals for Oranje. He then scored the winning goal as the Netherlands won 3–2. "I'm super proud and very glad I got past Robin. I thanked everyone in the dressing room," he told Nederlandse Omroep Stichting. "I also want to thank old teammates like Klaas-Jan Huntelaar and Arjen Robben, for example. They inspired me. The same goes for Patrick Kluivert. It was because of him that I wanted to reach the Dutch national team."

On 27 May 2026, Memphis was named in the Netherlands' squad for the 2026 FIFA World Cup. He provided an assist in a 5–1 victory over Sweden in the World Cup second group-stage match.

== Style of play ==
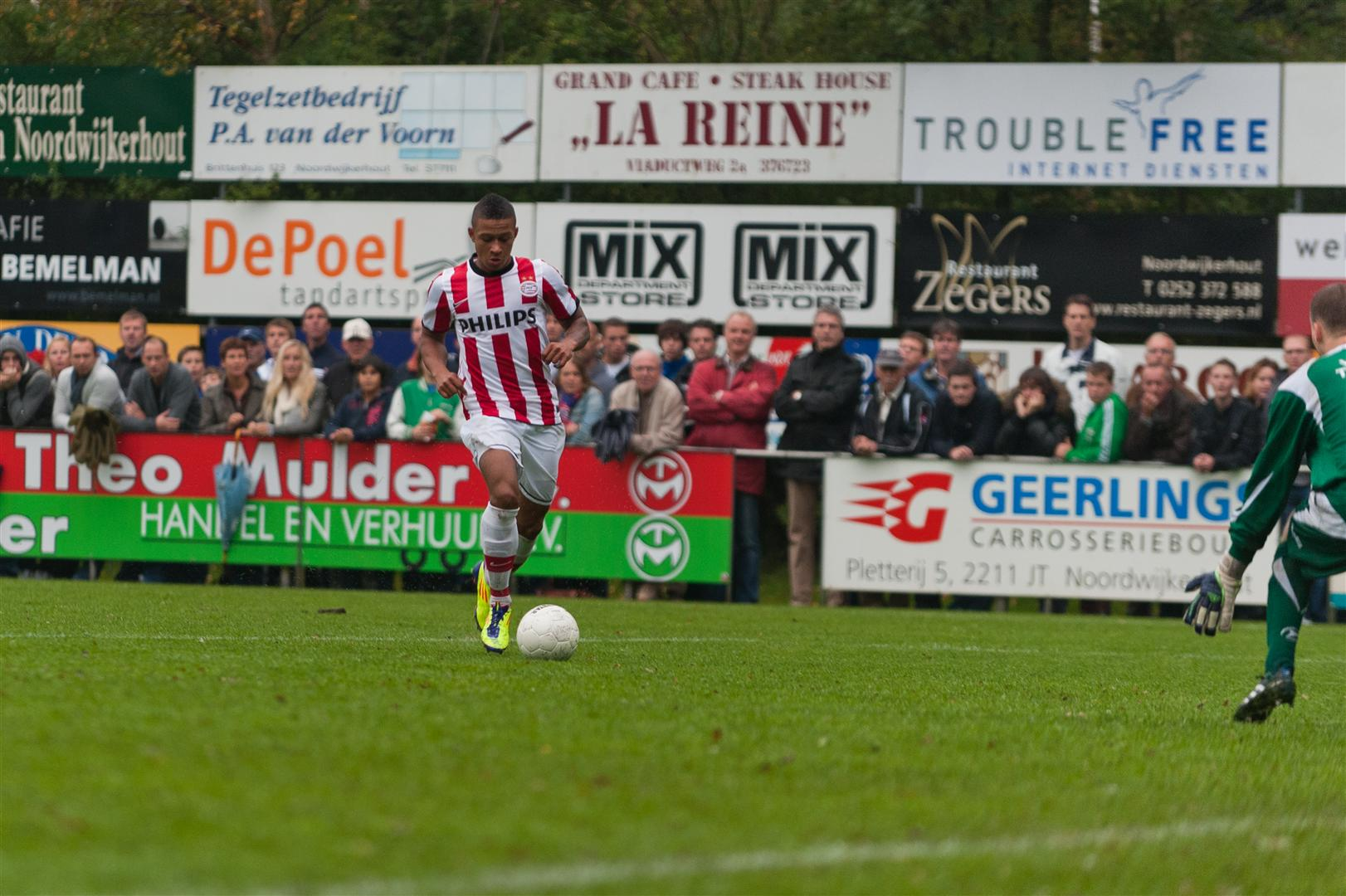
Memphis playing for PSV Eindhoven in 2011

Early in his career, a PSV coach noted Memphis as "very angry", and he now uses a life coach to aid his mentality. In April 2015, The Daily Telegraph described Memphis as "a fearsome striker of the ball with his right foot but is usually used as an inverted left winger who cuts onto his right foot. A pacey and tricky player, his direct running makes him a difficult opponent for defenders". However, they criticised him as "a ball-hog", pointing out his high rate of shots in comparison to a low rate of assists. Memphis is also known for his free-kick ability. During the 2014–15 season, he was statistically the best set-piece taker in the whole of Europe, as he scored 7 times in 33 attempts, the most in all European leagues and the second-best accuracy.

Former Dutch international and Dutch national team manager Ronald Koeman regards Memphis as "a great talent", but says that he must continue his personal development due to the physicality and mental strength needed in the Premier League. Former Wigan Athletic and Portsmouth defender Arjan de Zeeuw stated about Memphis: "People regard him as a little bit arrogant, a little bit cocky, but I think he is a very good player, a very promising player, a very strong, very quick player and he's got some skill."

Memphis has been compared to former Manchester United player Cristiano Ronaldo and fellow international Arjen Robben. Thijs Slegers said about the comparisons: "Memphis is a little bit like Cristiano; they have similar qualities, although there are of course areas where Memphis is inferior. However, his determination to be the best is where I see the real similarity with Cristiano." Like Ronaldo, he combines technical expertise with pure physical strength.

== Musical career ==
Memphis began pursuing a hip-hop career in June 2017 when he released his Los Angeles-inspired freestyle, "LA Vibes". The music video featured Quincy Promes, Memphis' teammate at the Netherlands national team. The song's music video earned around 150,000 views within hours of being uploaded to YouTube. In December 2017, Memphis released his freestyle track "Kings & Queens". On 3 October 2018, he collaborated with musical artists Winne and Nana Fofie and producer Rass King for his Ghana-inspired single, "AKWAABA", and also released his third freestyle, "Porto Cervo (Interlude)", with Winne. Memphis released his fourth freestyle, "5-mill" in response to his Instagram account reaching 5 million followers. Critics of the freestyle claimed that Memphis' public image was hampered through his cigar-smoking and his careless attitude.

In December 2018, he released his second single, "No Love", over his cancelled engagement with model Lori Harvey. The song is multilingual, switching back and forth between English and Dutch.

In July 2019, Memphis released "Fall Back". On 1 November 2019, Broederliefde released an album, Broeders, which featured Memphis in the song "Lange Jas". On 17 April 2020, he released "Dubai Freestyle".

In September 2020, Memphis released his new song "2 Corinthians 5:7". A month later on October 9, 2020, Memphis released "Blessing". The song's music video shows Memphis returning to his home town of Moordrecht. Memphis wrote a passage in his autobiography Heart of a Lion, which explained the meaning of the song.

"I wrote a track about this, called Blessings, and it includes these lines:

Seems like everybody’s wishing for the same shit.

They want a Roley and a chain, oh yeah

The other type of niggas that complain, ah

Keep waiting for a blessing but forget to pray, ah yeah

Younger individuals frequently seek material goals rather than spiritual ones, though financial wealth does not guarantee personal satisfaction. Public perception of success based on outer appearances can be inaccurate, and individual self-fulfillment represents a distinct form of achievement.

On 27 November 2020, he released his debut album Heavy Stepper. A 9 track EP including "2 Corinthians 5:7" and "Blessing" released as singles shortly before, and new tracks "Heavy Stepper", "Body Like You (feat. Zah Santori)", "From Ghana (feat. Rass King & Bisa Kdei)", "4AM Palm Flow", "Big Fish", the highly anticipated "For A Week" and "D.B.A (feat. Yasmin Lauryn)".

In 2021, he appeared on 101 Barz performing two freestyles. In 2022, he became more active, collaborating with SFB and Quincy Promes in the track "TAT TAT", which was released in November 2022. In January 2023, he collaborated with Bisa Kdei on an afro-beat track "Drinks on Me". This followed two more releases so far in 2023 including "Asem Beba" in February and "Leven Als Een Prof", translating to 'life as a professional', in April. In July 2023, Memphis released his third release of the year with the track "These Days", another multi-lingual track which switches between the Dutch and English language. In October 2023, Memphis released "Baby Don't Play", an all English afro-beat track in a style which is inspired by his Ghanaian roots.

Memphis has a lot of unreleased music which can be found on YouTube, clipped from Instagram stories or live streams between 2018 and 2022. Memphis claims he plans to release when it is the "right time".

=== Discography ===
Track no.	Title	Year	Album
—	"LA Vibes (feat. Quincy Promes)"	2017	Non-album freestyle
—	"Kings & Queens Freestyle"	2017	Non-album freestyle
—	"5 Milli Freestyle"	2018	Non-album freestyle
7	"Porto Cervo (Interlude) (feat. Memphis Depay)"	2018	"Oprecht Door Zee" - Winne
18	"Akwaaba feat. Memphis Depay & Nana Fofie"	2018	"Oprecht Door Zee" - Winne
—	"No Love"	2018	Non-album single
—	"Fall Back"	2019	Non-album single
11	"Lange Jas (feat. Memphis Depay)"	2019	"Broeders" – Broederliefde
—	"Dubai Freestyle"	2020	Non-album freestyle
01	"Heavy Stepper (feat. Arra)"	2020	Heavy Stepper
02	"Body Like You (feat. Zah Santori)"	2020	Heavy Stepper
03	"From Ghana feat. Rass King & Bisa Kdei"	2020	Heavy Stepper
04	"4AM Palm Flow"	2020	Heavy Stepper
05	"Big Fish"	2020	Heavy Stepper
06	"For A Week"	2020	Heavy Stepper
07	"2 Corinthians 5:7"	2020	Heavy Stepper
08	"Blessing"	2020	Heavy Stepper
09	"D.B.A. (feat. Yasmin Lauryn)"	2020	Heavy Stepper
02	"TAT TAT( feat. Memphis Depay & Quincy Promes)"	2022	"Reset The Levels IV" - SFB
03	"Drinks on Me (feat. Memphis Depay)"	2023	"ORIGINAL" - Bisa Kdei
—	"Asem Beba"	2023	Non-album single
—	"Leven Als Een Prof"	2023	Non-album single
—	"These Days"	2023	Non-album single
—	"Baby Don't Play"	2023	Non-album single
—	"Kings & Kingdoms"	2024	Non-album single
—	"Bedankt Voor Je Mening (feat. Akwasi)"	2024	Non-album single
—	"YM$ (feat. Lusho)"	2024	Non-album single
01	"Falando com as Favelas (feat. MC Hariel)"	2025	Falando com as Favelas
02	"Peita do Coringão (feat. MC Hariel & MC Marks)"	2025	Falando com as Favelas
03	"Suor e Sangue (feat. MC Hariel & Perera DJ)"	2025	Falando com as Favelas
04	"Renascer (feat. MC Hariel)"	2025	Falando com as Favelas
—	"São Paulo Freestyle"	2025	Non-album freestyle
—	"Hard Times Never Humbled Us"	2025	Non-album single
—	"Work a Lot"	2025	Non-album single

== Personal life ==
Memphis is a Christian. He became a Christian in 2016. During the 2022 FIFA World Cup, Memphis led a Bible study with his teammate Cody Gakpo for 15 other Netherlands players.

Memphis has numerous tattoos, including one on his left arm that is a tribute to his grandfather, who died on the day before he turned 15. When he scored against Australia at the 2014 World Cup, he kissed this tattoo and pointed to the sky, dedicating his goal to his late grandfather, a moment which he then in 2016 commemorated with a tattoo on his left torso depicting Christ the Redeemer and the date 18.06.14, referring to his first international goal for the Netherlands. He also has a tattoo on the inside of his lip stating succesvol (which is Dutch for 'successful') and also has the words 'dream chaser' emblazoned on his upper torso.

In June 2017, it was announced on social media that Memphis was engaged to Lori Harvey, the youngest daughter of American television personality Steve Harvey. Since then, they have ended their engagement and relationship.

In April 2020, Memphis was criticised by several animal rights organisations for posting pictures of himself with a liger cub while on vacation in Dubai. He responded by stating that "ligers are not even wild animals".

In June 2022, Memphis visited Ghana where he undertook some philanthropic works in the Cape Coast School of the Deaf and Blind.

== Career statistics ==
=== Club ===
As of match played 18 November 2026

Appearances and goals by club, season and competition
Club	Season	League			State league (Note: Includes Campeonato Paulista)		National cup (Note: Includes KNVB Cup, FA Cup, Coupe de France, Copa del Rey, Copa do Brasil)		League cup (Note: Includes Football League/EFL Cup, Coupe de la Ligue)		Continental		Other		Total	
Club	Season	Division	Apps	Goals	Apps	Goals	Apps	Goals	Apps	Goals	Apps	Goals	Apps	Goals	Apps	Goals
PSV Eindhoven	2011–12	Eredivisie	8	3	—		3	1	—		—		—		11	4
PSV Eindhoven	2012–13	Eredivisie	20	2	—		4	1	—		5 (Note: Appearances in UEFA Europa League)	0	1 (Note: Appearance in Johan Cruyff Shield)	0	30	3
PSV Eindhoven	2013–14	Eredivisie	32	12	—		1	0	—		10 (Note: Four appearances and one goal in UEFA Champions League, six appearances and one goal in UEFA Europa League)	2	—		43	14
PSV Eindhoven	2014–15	Eredivisie	30	22	—		1	0	—		9	6	—		40	28
PSV Eindhoven	Total		90	39	—		9	2	—		24	8	1	0	124	49
Manchester United	2015–16	Premier League	29	2	—		3	0	2	0	11 (Note: Eight appearances and three goals in UEFA Champions League, three appearances and two goals in UEFA Europa League)	5	—		45	7
Manchester United	2016–17	Premier League	4	0	—		0	0	1	0	3	—		0	8	0
Manchester United	Total		33	2	—		3	0	3	0	14	5	0	0	53	7
Lyon	2016–17	Ligue 1	17	5	—		1	0	—		—		—		18	5
Lyon	2017–18	Ligue 1	36	19	—		4	0	1	0	10	3	—		51	22
Lyon	2018–19	Ligue 1	36	10	—		2	1	1	0	8 (Note: Appearance(s) in UEFA Champions League)	1	—		47	12
Lyon	2019–20	Ligue 1	13	9	—		—		1	0	8	6	—		22	15
Lyon	2020–21	Ligue 1	37	20	—		3	2	—		—		—		40	22
Lyon	Total		139	63	—		10	3	3	0	26	10	—		178	76
Barcelona	2021–22	La Liga	28	12	—		—		—		9 (Note: Six appearances in UEFA Champions League, three appearances and one goal in UEFA Europa League)	1	1 (Note: Appearance in Supercopa de España)	0	38	13
Barcelona	2022–23	La Liga	2	1	—		1	0	—		1	0	—		4	1
Barcelona	Total		30	13	—		1	0	—		10	1	1	0	42	14
Atlético Madrid	2022–23	La Liga	8	4	—		1	0	—		—		—		9	4
Atlético Madrid	2023–24	La Liga	23	5	—		5	3	—		3	1	—		31	9
Atlético Madrid	Total		31	9	—		6	3	—		3	1	—		40	13
Corinthians	2024	Série A	11	7	—		—		—		3 (Note: Appearances in Copa Sudamericana)	0	—		14	7
Corinthians	2025	Série A	23	6	12	2	8	3	—		8 (Note: Four appearances in Copa Libertadores, three appearances and one goal in Copa Sudamericana)	1	—		51	12
Corinthians	2026	Série A	16	1	4	0	0	0	—		4 (Note: Appearances in Copa Libertadores)	0	1 (Note: Appearance in Supercopa do Brasil)	0	25	1
Corinthians	Total		50	14	16	2	8	3	—		15	1	1	0	90	20
Career total			373	141	16	2	37	11	6	0	92	26	3	0	527	180

=== International ===
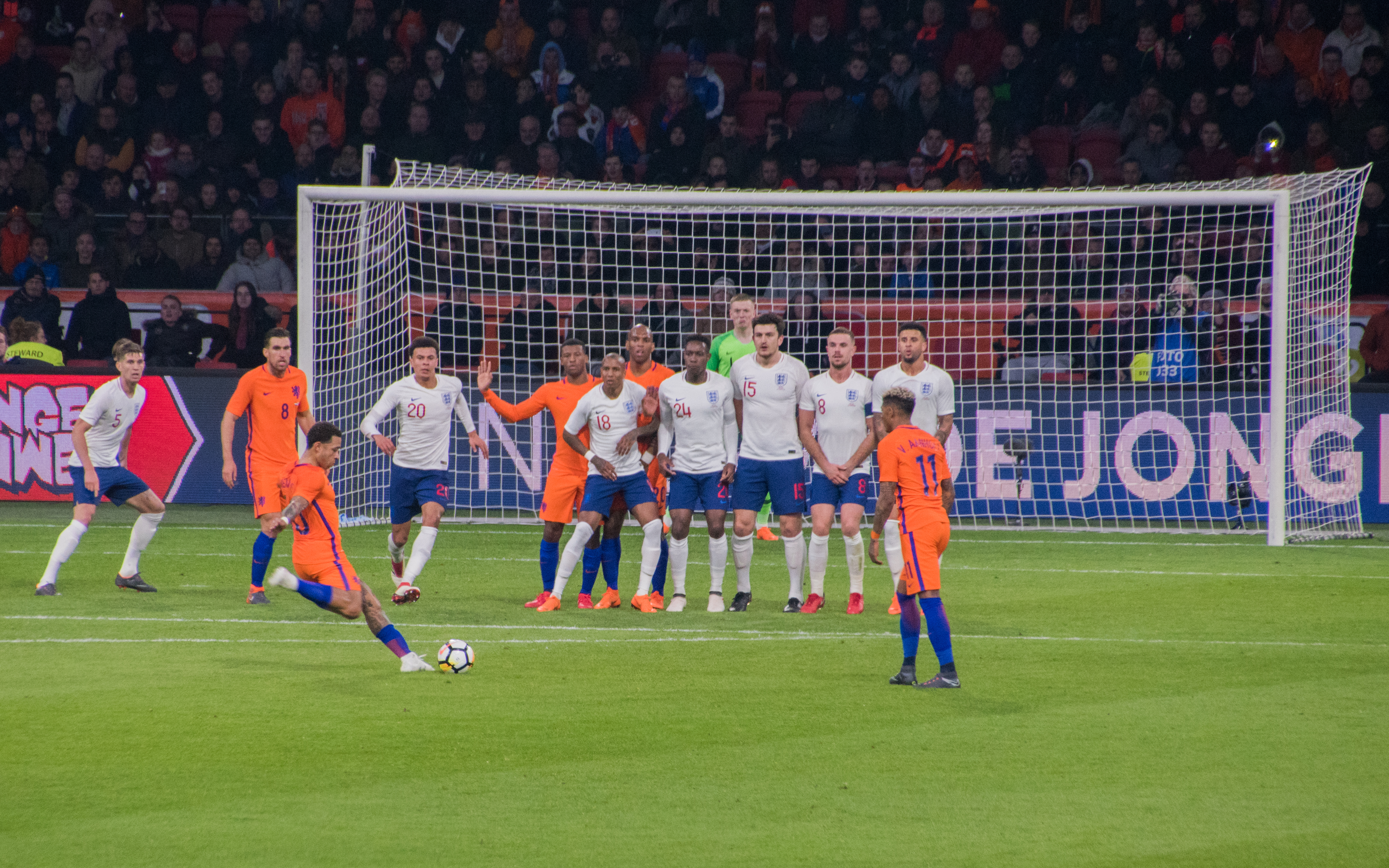
Depay taking a free kick in a friendly against England in March 2018.

As of match played 25 June 2026

Appearances and goals by national team and year
National team	Year	Apps	Goals
Netherlands	2013	3	0
Netherlands	2014	10	2
Netherlands	2015	8	1
Netherlands	2016	6	2
Netherlands	2017	7	3
Netherlands	2018	10	5
Netherlands	2019	8	6
Netherlands	2020	7	2
Netherlands	2021	16	17
Netherlands	2022	11	5
Netherlands	2023	2	1
Netherlands	2024	10	2
Netherlands	2025	10	9
Netherlands	2026	4	0
Total		112	55

== Honours ==
PSV Eindhoven

- Eredivisie: 2014–15
- KNVB Cup: 2011–12
- Johan Cruyff Shield: 2012

Barcelona

- La Liga: 2022–23
- Supercopa de España: 2023

Corinthians

- Copa do Brasil: 2025
- Supercopa do Brasil: 2026
- Campeonato Paulista: 2025

Netherlands U17

- UEFA European Under-17 Championship: 2011

Netherlands

- FIFA World Cup third place: 2014

Individual

- UEFA European Under-17 Championship Team of the Tournament: 2011
- Eredivisie top scorer: 2014–15
- Johan Cruyff Trophy: 2014–15
- France Football Best Young Player: 2015
- UNFP Ligue 1 Goal of the Year: 2016–17
- UNFP Ligue 1 Player of the Month: April 2018
- UNFP Ligue 1 Team of the Year: 2020–21
- Ligue 1 top assist provider: 2020–21
- UEFA FIFA World Cup qualification top scorer: 2022 (12 goals)
- La Liga Goal of the Month: August 2023

== See also ==
- List of men's footballers with 100 or more international caps
- List of men's footballers with 50 or more international goals
