= 2012 Johan Cruyff Shield =

Johan Cruijff Schaal XVII
PSV Eindhoven	Ajax
4	2
- Date: 5 August 2012
- Venue: Amsterdam Arena, Amsterdam
- Referee: Björn Kuipers
- Attendance: 50,000

The seventeenth edition of the Johan Cruyff Shield (Dutch: Johan Cruijff Schaal) was held on 5 August 2012 at the Amsterdam Arena. The match was played between 2011–12 KNVB Cup winners PSV Eindhoven and the 2011–12 Eredivisie champions Ajax. PSV won the match 4–2 in front of 50,000 fans.

== Match ==
=== Details ===
5 August 2012

PSV Eindhoven	4–2	Ajax
Toivonen 3', 53'; Lens 11'; Wijnaldum 90+4'	Report	Alderweireld 44'; Marcelo 75' (o.g.)

Amsterdam Arena, Amsterdam
Attendance: 50,000
Referee: Björn Kuipers

PSV Eindhoven	Ajax

GK	1	(Poland) Przemysław Tytoń	(yellow card) 78'
RB	13	(Canada) Atiba Hutchinson
CB	4	(Brazil) Marcelo
CB	3	(Netherlands) Wilfred Bouma
LB	15	(Netherlands) Jetro Willems
CM	6	(Netherlands) Mark van Bommel (c)
CM	8	(Netherlands) Kevin Strootman	(yellow card) 37'
AM	7	(Sweden) Ola Toivonen		(substituted off) 74'
RW	17	(Netherlands) Luciano Narsingh		(substituted off) 84'
CF	11	(Netherlands) Jeremain Lens
LW	14	(Belgium) Dries Mertens
Substitutes:
GK	21	(Netherlands) Boy Waterman
DF	18	(Belgium) Timothy Derijck
MF	20	(Netherlands) Peter van Ooijen
MF	24	(Austria) Marcel Ritzmaier
MF	10	(Netherlands) Georginio Wijnaldum		(substituted on) 74'
FW	22	(Netherlands) Memphis Depay		(substituted on) 84'
FW	9	(Slovenia) Tim Matavž
Manager:
(Netherlands) Dick Advocaat

GK	1	(Netherlands) Kenneth Vermeer
RB	24	(Netherlands) Ricardo van Rhijn	(yellow card) 90+2'
CB	3	(Belgium) Toby Alderweireld	(yellow card) 90+1'
CB	17	(Netherlands) Daley Blind
LB	35	(Netherlands) Mitchell Dijks	(yellow card) 31'	(substituted off) 76'
DM	5	(Netherlands) Vurnon Anita
CM	10	(Netherlands) Siem de Jong (c)	(yellow card) 79'
CM	16	(Netherlands) Theo Janssen	(yellow card) 78'
RW	23	(Armenia) Aras Özbiliz
CF	9	(Iceland) Kolbeinn Sigþórsson		(substituted off) 76'
LW	39	(Denmark) Viktor Fischer		(substituted off) 65'
Substitutes:
GK	22	(Netherlands) Jasper Cillessen
DF	33	(Netherlands) Joël Veltman
DF	26	(Netherlands) Dico Koppers		(substituted on) 76'
MF	25	(South Africa) Thulani Serero
MF	20	(Denmark) Lasse Schöne		(substituted on) 65'
MF	18	(Netherlands) Davy Klaassen		(substituted on) 76'
FW	11	(Netherlands) Lorenzo Ebecilio
Manager:
(Netherlands) Frank de Boer
