= 2011–12 PSV Eindhoven season =

PSV Eindhoven
2011–12 season
- Chairman: Peter Swinkels
- Head coach: Fred Rutten (until March 2012); Phillip Cocu (caretaker) (from March 2012)
- Stadium: Philips Stadion
- Eredivisie: 3rd
- KNVB Cup: Champions
- UEFA Europa League: Round of 16 vs Valencia
- Top goalscorer: League: Dries Mertens (21 goals); All: Dries Mertens; Ola Toivonen (27 each)
Home colours	Away colours

The 2011–12 PSV Eindhoven season saw the club competing in the 2011–12 Eredivisie, 2011–12 KNVB Cup and 2011–12 Europa League.

== Players ==
Note: Flags indicate national team as defined under FIFA eligibility rules; some limited exceptions apply. Players may hold more than one non-FIFA nationality.

No.	Pos.	Nation	Player
1	GK	SWE	Andreas Isaksson
2	DF	BUL	Stanislav Manolev
3	DF	NED	Wilfred Bouma
4	DF	BRA	Marcelo
5	DF	NED	Erik Pieters
6	MF	NED	Kevin Strootman (captain)
7	FW	SWE	Ola Toivonen
8	MF	NED	Orlando Engelaar
9	FW	SLO	Tim Matavž
10	MF	NED	Georginio Wijnaldum
11	FW	NED	Jeremain Lens
13	DF	CAN	Atiba Hutchinson
14	FW	BEL	Dries Mertens

No.	Pos.	Nation	Player
15	MF	BEL	Stijn Wuytens
17	DF	NED	Abel Tamata
18	DF	BEL	Timothy Derijck
19	FW	NED	Jan Vennegoor of Hesselink
20	MF	MAR	Zakaria Labyad
21	GK	POL	Przemysław Tytoń
22	FW	NED	Memphis Depay
23	MF	BEL	Funso Ojo
24	MF	AUT	Marcel Ritzmaier
27	DF	BEL	Stefano Marzo
33	GK	MAR	Khalid Sinouh
42	FW	NED	Jürgen Locadia
43	DF	NED	Jetro Willems

== Transfers ==
=== Summer ===
In: Note: Flags indicate national team as defined under FIFA eligibility rules; some limited exceptions apply. Players may hold more than one non-FIFA nationality.

No.	Pos.	Nation	Player
6	MF	NED	Kevin Strootman (from (Netherlands) Utrecht)
9	FW	SLO	Tim Matavž (from (Netherlands) Groningen)
10	MF	NED	Georginio Wijnaldum (from (Netherlands) Feyenoord)
14	FW	BEL	Dries Mertens (from (Netherlands) Utrecht)
18	DF	BEL	Timothy Derijck (from (Netherlands) ADO Den Haag)
21	GK	POL	Przemysław Tytoń (from (Netherlands) Roda JC)
33	GK	MAR	Khalid Sinouh (from (Netherlands) Utrecht)
43	DF	NED	Jetro Willems (from (Netherlands) Sparta Rotterdam)

Out: Note: Flags indicate national team as defined under FIFA eligibility rules; some limited exceptions apply. Players may hold more than one non-FIFA nationality.

No.	Pos.	Nation	Player
4	DF	MEX	Francisco Javier Rodríguez (to (Germany) VfB Stuttgart)
5	DF	SRB	Jagoš Vuković (loan to (Netherlands) Roda JC)
10	FW	NED	Danny Koevermans (to (Canada) Toronto FC)
16	FW	NED	Stef Nijland (loan to (Netherlands) NEC)
22	MF	HUN	Balázs Dzsudzsák (to (Russia) Anzhi Makhachkala)
28	MF	NED	Otman Bakkal (loan to (Netherlands) Feyenoord)
30	FW	BRA	Jonathan Reis (to (Netherlands) Vitesse)
31	GK	BRA	Cássio (to (Brazil) Corinthians)
36	FW	NED	Género Zeefuik (loan to (Netherlands) NEC)
41	GK	NED	Jeroen Zoet (loan to (Netherlands) RKC Waalwijk)
—	MF	MAR	Youness Mokhtar (loan to (Netherlands) FC Eindhoven)

=== Winter ===
In: Note: Flags indicate national team as defined under FIFA eligibility rules; some limited exceptions apply. Players may hold more than one non-FIFA nationality.

No.	Pos.	Nation	Player
19	FW	NED	Jan Vennegoor of Hesselink

Out: Note: Flags indicate national team as defined under FIFA eligibility rules; some limited exceptions apply. Players may hold more than one non-FIFA nationality.

No.	Pos.	Nation	Player
16	MF	NGR	Rabiu Ibrahim (Released)

== Competitions ==
=== Eredivisie ===
==== Results summary ====
Overall								Home						Away					
Pld	W	D	L	GF	GA	GD	Pts	W	D	L	GF	GA	GD	W	D	L	GF	GA	GD
34	21	6	7	87	47	+40	69	15	1	1	57	20	+37	6	5	6	30	27	+3

==== Results by round ====
Round	1	2	3	4	5	6	7	8	9	10	11	12	13	14	15	16	17	18	19	20	21	22	23	24	25	26	27	28	29	30	31	32	33	34
Ground	A	H	A	H	A	H	H	A	H	A	A	H	A	H	A	H	A	A	H	A	H	A	H	H	A	H	A	H	A	H	H	A	H	A
Result	L	W	W	W	D	D	W	W	W	D	D	W	W	W	L	W	W	D	W	D	W	L	W	L	L	W	L	W	L	W	W	W	W	W
Position	16	9	6	3	5	5	4	2	2	2	2	3	2	2	2	2	2	2	1	1	1	2	2	3	4	4	4	4	5	5	5	3	3	3

Source: see below
A = Away; H = Home; W = Win; D = Draw; L = Loss

==== Results ====
7 August 2011 1	AZ	3 – 1	PSV	Alkmaar
12:30 CEST (UTC+2)	Martens 26'; Moisander (yellow card) 38' (yellow-red card) 82'; Viergever 40'; Altidore 80' (yellow card) 88'	Summary	Mertens 45+2'; Ojo (yellow card) 61'; Pieters (yellow card) 76'	Stadium: AFAS Stadion; Attendance: 16,298; Referee: Eric Braamhaar

13 August 2011 2	PSV	1 – 0	RKC Waalwijk	Eindhoven
19:45 CEST (UTC+2)	Mertens 24'; Ojo (yellow card) 33'; Manolev (yellow card) 61'; Marcelo (yellow card) 68'; Pieters (yellow card) 71'	Summary	Duits (yellow card) 21'; Auassar (yellow card) 25'; Ramos (yellow card) 89'	Stadium: Philips Stadion; Attendance: 32,700; Referee: Kevin Blom

21 August 2011 3	ADO Den Haag	0 – 3	PSV	The Hague
16:30 CEST (UTC+2)	Verhoek (yellow card) 31'; Immers (yellow card) 42'; Leeuwin (yellow card) 43'; Kum (yellow card) 45+2'; Toornstra (yellow card) 53'	Summary	Mertens 21'; Wijnaldum 24'; Toivonen 39'; Lens (yellow card) 61'; Manolev (yellow card) 71'	Stadium: Kyocera Stadion; Attendance: 12,710; Referee: Jan Wegereef

28 August 2011 4	PSV	6 – 1	Excelsior	Eindhoven
16:30 CEST (UTC+2)	Mertens 30', 49', 51'; Toivonen 47', 79', (yellow card) 55'; Lens 72'	Summary	Jansen (yellow card) 25'; Te Vrede 39'; Van Steensel (yellow card) 64'	Stadium: Philips Stadion; Attendance: 33,000; Referee: Reinold Wiedemeijer

11 September 2011 5	VVV	3 – 3	PSV	Venlo
14:30 CEST (UTC+2)	Linssen (yellow card) 26'; Cullen (yellow card) 27'; De Regt 48'; Nwofor 52'; Yoshida 54'; Emenike (yellow card) 78'; Meeuwis (red card) 83'	Summary	Toivonen 11'; Mertens 34', (yellow card) 57'; Bouma 76'; Manolev (yellow card) 90+3'	Stadium: De Koel; Attendance: 7,500; Referee: Bas Nijhuis

18 September 2011 6	PSV	2 – 2	Ajax	Eindhoven
12:30 CEST (UTC+2)	Matavž 2'; Wijnaldum 55' (pen.), (yellow card) 69'	Summary	Sigþórsson 45+4'; Enoh (yellow card) 49'; Vertonghen (yellow card) 58'; Janssen (yellow card) 69'; Bulykin 79'	Stadium: Philips Stadion; Attendance: 33,000; Referee: Björn Kuipers

24 September 2011 7	PSV	7 – 1	Roda JC	Eindhoven
18:45 CEST (UTC+2)	Toivonen 15'; Mertens 20', 33', 58', 89'; Strootman 34'; Matavž 83'	Summary	Vuković (red card) 19'; Wielaert (yellow card) 48'; Malki 57'; Broekhof (yellow card) 60'	Stadium: Philips Stadion; Attendance: 33,000; Referee: Reinold Wiedemeijer

2 October 2011 8	NEC	0 – 2	PSV	Nijmegen
16:30 CEST (UTC+2)	Koolwijk (yellow card) 67'	Summary	Pieters (yellow card) 82'; Labyad 85'; Matavž 87'	Stadium: Stadion de Goffert; Attendance: 12,300; Referee: Jan Wegereef

15 October 2011 9	PSV	1 – 0	Utrecht	Eindhoven
19:45 CEST (UTC+2)	Toivonen 71'; Labyad (yellow card) 90+1'	Summary	Zullo (yellow card) 32'; Mårtensson (yellow card) 37'; Asare (yellow card) 42'; Nilsson (red card) 88'	Stadium: Philips Stadion; Attendance: 32,700; Referee: Pol van Boekel

23 October 2011 10	Vitesse	1 – 1	PSV	Arnhem
16:30 CEST (UTC+2)	Van Ginkel (yellow card) 27'; Annan (yellow card) 45+1'; Bony 58'	Summary	Matavž 18'; Marcelo (yellow card) 62'; Strootman (yellow card) 82'; Manolev (yellow card) 88'	Stadium: GelreDome; Attendance: 22,207; Referee: Richard Liesveld

29 October 2011 11	Twente	2 – 2	PSV	Enschede
20:45 CEST (UTC+2)	Douglas 10'; Fer 78' (yellow card) 78'; Brama (yellow card) 81'	Summary	Labyad 11'; Marcelo (yellow card) 41', (goal) 64'; Toivonen (yellow card) 71'; Strootman (red card) 72'	Stadium: De Grolsch Veste; Attendance: 23,000; Referee: Kevin Blom

6 November 2011 12	PSV	4 – 1	Heracles Almelo	Eindhoven
20:45 CET (UTC+1)	Engelaar (yellow card) 33'; Bouma (yellow card) 38'; Toivonen 49'; Lens 58', 63', 89'; Manolev (yellow card) 75'	Summary	Rienstra (yellow card) 4'; Van der Linden 13'; Breukers (yellow card) 39'	Stadium: Philips Stadion; Attendance: 32,900; Referee: Björn Kuipers

19 November 2011 13	De Graafschap	1 – 3	PSV	Doetinchem
18:45 CET (UTC+1)	El Hassnaoui 22'; Kujala (yellow card) 45'; Rose (yellow card) 57'; Evers (yellow card) 73'	Summary	Matavž 11'; Willems (yellow card) 45+1'; Wijnaldum 54', 84'; Derijck (yellow card) 58'	Stadium: De Vijverberg; Attendance: 12,505; Referee: Ed Jessen

26 November 2011 14	PSV	6 – 1	Groningen	Eindhoven
20:45 CET (UTC+1)	Strootman 15'; Mertens 30'; Labyad 36'; Wijnaldum 47'; Matavž 55'; Toivonen 72'; Marcelo (yellow card) 76'	Summary	Kieftenbeld (yellow card) 16'; Pedersen 48'	Stadium: Philips Stadion; Attendance: 33,200; Referee: Danny Makkelie

4 December 2011 15	Feyenoord	2 – 0	PSV	Rotterdam
12:30 CET (UTC+1)	El Ahmadi (yellow card) 28'; Leerdam (yellow card) 39'; Cissé 41'; Schaken 50'; Vlaar (yellow card) 75'	Summary	Bouma (yellow card) 50'	Stadium: De Kuip; Attendance: 46,000; Referee: Björn Kuipers

10 December 2011 16	PSV	1 – 0	NAC Breda	Eindhoven
20:45 CET (UTC+1)	Mertens 37'; Marcelo (yellow card) 90'; Lens (yellow card) 90+3' (yellow-red card) 90+3'	Summary	Schilder (yellow card) 27'; Janse (yellow card) 44'; Bonevacia (yellow card) 74'; Gorter (yellow card) 86'	Stadium: Philips Stadion; Attendance: 33,000; Referee: Bas Nijhuis

18 December 2011 17	Heerenveen	1 – 5	PSV	Heerenveen
16:30 CET (UTC+1)	Kums (yellow card) 38'; Van La Parra 73'	Summary	Toivonen 18', 24'; Matavž 20'; Wijnaldum 49', 59'	Stadium: Abe Lenstra Stadion; Attendance: 26,100; Referee: Pol van Boekel

22 January 2012 18	Utrecht	1 – 1	PSV	Utrecht
16:30 CET (UTC+1)	Van der Maarel (yellow card) 10'; Asare (yellow card) 24'; Lilipaly 66'	Summary	Labyad (yellow card) 24'; Strootman (yellow card) 35'; Mertens (yellow card) 62'; Toivonen 71'	Stadium: Stadion Galgenwaard; Attendance: 20,347; Referee: Richard Liesveld

27 January 2012 19	PSV	3 – 1	Vitesse	Eindhoven
20:00 CET (UTC+1)	Matavž 31'; Labyad (yellow card) 68'; Manolev (yellow card) 73', (goal) 90+3'; Mertens 76'	Summary	Büttner (yellow card) 71'; Van der Heijden (yellow card) 71'; Havenaar 84'	Stadium: Philips Stadion; Attendance: 34,000; Referee: Bas Nijhuis

5 February 2012 20	Heracles Almelo	1 – 1	PSV	Almelo
14:30 CET (UTC+1)	Everton 76'; Bruns (yellow card) 81'	Summary	Labyad 19'; Toivonen (yellow card) 49'; Manolev (yellow card) 85'	Stadium: Polman Stadion; Attendance: 8,500; Referee: Pieter Vink

12 February 2012 21	PSV	4 – 1	De Graafschap	Eindhoven
14:30 CET (UTC+1)	Mertens 8'; Toivonen 26'; Strootman (yellow card) 28'; Matavž 29'; Lens 43'	Summary	Saeijs (yellow card) 31'; Srećković (yellow card) 41'; Vermouth 52'; Rose (yellow card) 86'	Stadium: Philips Stadion; Attendance: 33,100; Referee: Jan Wegereef

19 February 2012 22	Groningen	3 – 0	PSV	Groningen
12:30 CET (UTC+1)	Suk 29', 74'; Kappelhof (yellow card) 35'; Ivens (yellow card) 43'; Bacuna 51'	Summary	Manolev (yellow card) 48' (yellow-red card) 56'	Stadium: Euroborg; Attendance: 22,334; Referee: Reinold Weidemeijer

26 February 2012 23	PSV	3 – 2	Feyenoord	Eindhoven
14:30 CET (UTC+1)	Toivonen 44'; Mertens 66'; Labyad 85'	Summary	Mokotjo (yellow card) 8'; Fernandez (yellow card) 56', (goal) 71', 79'	Stadium: Philips Stadion; Attendance: 33,000; Referee: Richard Liesveld

4 March 2012 24	PSV	2 – 6	Twente	Eindhoven
16:30 CET (UTC+1)	Labyad (yellow card) 33'; Toivonen 55', 82'	Summary	Janssen (yellow card) 6', (goal) 19', 87'; John 8'; Wisgerhof 35'; De Jong 40'; Douglas (red card) 51'; Mihaylov (yellow card) 63'; Fer 74'	Stadium: Philips Stadion; Attendance: 33,000; Referee: Pol van Boekel

11 March 2012 25	NAC Breda	3 – 1	PSV	Breda
12:30 CET (UTC+1)	Lurling (yellow card) 7', (goal) 16'; Kolk 12', 54'; Boukhari (yellow card) 45'; Lasnik (yellow card) 89'	Summary	Wijnaldum 5'; Manolev (yellow card) 19' (yellow-red card) 42'; Mertens (yellow card) 38'; Lens (yellow card) 85'; Labyad (yellow card) 88'	Stadium: Rat Verlegh Stadion; Attendance: 18,750; Referee: Danny Makkelie

18 March 2012 26	PSV	5 – 1	Heerenveen	Eindhoven
14:30 CET (UTC+1)	Toivonen 5', (yellow card) 22'; Pieters (yellow card) 25'; Mertens 57', 75'; Hutchinson (yellow card) 61'; Engelaar 72'; Depay 85'	Summary	Đuričić (yellow card) 16'; Pieters 51' (o.g.); Kruiswijk (yellow card) 64'	Stadium: Philips Stadion; Attendance: 33,200; Referee: Ruud Bossen

25 March 2012 27	Ajax	2 – 0	PSV	Amsterdam
16:30 CEST (UTC+2)	Aissati 56'; De Jong 62' (pen.)	Summary	Mertens (yellow card) 25'; Strootman (yellow card) 45'; Hutchinson (yellow card) 61'; Marcelo (yellow card) 62'; Matavž (yellow card) 84'	Stadium: Amsterdam Arena; Attendance: 51,207; Referee: Pieter Vink

31 March 2012 28	PSV	2 – 0	VVV	Eindhoven
19:45 CEST (UTC+2)	Matavž 9'; Depay 90'	Summary	Vorstermans (yellow card) 69'	Stadium: Philips Stadion; Attendance: 34,000; Referee: Kevin Blom

11 April 2012 29	RKC Waalwijk	2 – 1	PSV	Waalwijk
20:00 CEST (UTC+2)	Duits (yellow card) 34', (goal) 55'; Schet 57'	Summary	Vennegoor of Hesselink 86'	Stadium: Mandemakers Stadion; Attendance: 6,000; Referee: Jan Wegereef

14 April 2012 30	PSV	3 – 2	AZ	Eindhoven
17:45 CEST (UTC+2)	Lens 17', 77', (yellow card) 45'; Strootman (yellow card) 42'; Labyad (yellow card) 45'; Toivonen (yellow card) 90+2'; Matavž 90+3'	Summary	Altidore 24'; Beerens 34'; Reijnen (yellow card) 68'	Stadium: Philips Stadion; Attendance: 34,200; Referee: Björn Kuipers

22 April 2012 31	PSV	2 – 1	NEC	Eindhoven
14:30 CEST (UTC+2)	Willems (yellow card) 57', (goal) 68'; Vennegoor of Hesselink 88'	Summary	Nuytinck (yellow card) 5'; Foor 7'; Szélesi (yellow card) 11'; Koolwijk (yellow card) 57'	Stadium: Philips Stadion; Attendance: 33,000; Referee: Reinold Wiedemeijer

29 April 2012 32	Roda JC	1 – 3	PSV	Kerkrade
13:30 CEST (UTC+2)	Malki 65'; Vormer (yellow card) 79'; Kieszek (red card) 81'; Djoum (yellow card) 90'	Summary	Mertens 7'; Marcelo 31', (yellow card) 79'; Toivonen (yellow card) 57'; Lens (yellow card) 76'; Wijnaldum (yellow card) 79'; Depay 84'	Stadium: Parkstad Limburg Stadion; Attendance: 17,106; Referee: Bas Nijhuis

2 May 2012 33	PSV	5 – 0	ADO Den Haag	Eindhoven
20:00 CEST (UTC+2)	Lens 22'; Toivonen 38', 62'; Labyad 66'; Mertens 88'	Summary	N'Toko (yellow card) 35'; Visser (red card) 90'	Stadium: Philips Stadion; Attendance: 34,000; Referee: Eric Braamhaar

6 May 2012 34	Excelsior	1 – 3	PSV	Rotterdam
14:30 CEST (UTC+2)	Vincken (yellow card) 29'; Bruins 50' (pen.)	Summary	Mertens 10'; Lens 37', (yellow card) 44'; Willems (yellow card) 40'; Toivonen (yellow card) 49'; Wijnaldum 66'; Bouma (yellow card) 81'	Stadium: Stadion Woudestein; Attendance: 3,514; Referee: Danny Makkelie

==== League table ====
Pos	Team	Pld	W	D	L	GF	GA	GD	Pts	Qualification or relegation
1	Ajax (C)	34	23	7	4	93	36	+57	76	Qualification to Champions League group stage
2	Feyenoord	34	21	7	6	70	37	+33	70	Qualification to Champions League third qualifying round
3	PSV	34	21	6	7	87	47	+40	69	Qualification to Europa League play-off round (Note: PSV qualified for the play-off round of the 2012–13 UEFA Europa League after winning the 2011–12 KNVB Cup. As they finished third in the league, all Europa League berths and play-off places were moved down one spot from the original scheme.)
4	AZ	34	19	8	7	64	35	+29	65	Qualification to Europa League play-off round
5	Heerenveen	34	18	10	6	79	59	+20	64	Qualification to Europa League third qualifying round

Source: Eredivisie (official site) (in Dutch)
Rules for classification: 1) points; 2) goal difference; 3) number of goals scored.
(C) Champions

=== KNVB Cup ===
22 September 2011 Second round	VVSB	0 – 8	PSV	Noordwijkerhout
17:00 CEST (UTC+2)		Summary	Ojo (yellow card) 14'; Depay 20'; Wijnaldum 23' (pen.); Toivonen 41'; Labyad 47', 73', 82'; Locadia 80'; Ibrahim 90'	Stadium: Sportpark De Boekhorst; Attendance: 2,500; Referee: Dennis Higler

27 October 2011 Third round	PSV	3 – 0	Lisse	Eindhoven
20:00 CEST (UTC+2)	Manolev 56'; Labyad 67'; Mertens 72'	Summary	Rauws (yellow card) 26'; Van Heulen (yellow card) 42'	Stadium: Philips Stadion; Attendance: 30,200; Referee: Maarten Ketting

22 December 2011 Fourth round	Twente	1 – 2 (a.e.t.)	PSV	Enschede
20:45 CET (UTC+1)	De Jong (yellow card) 102'; Janko 110' (pen.)	Report	Strootman (yellow card) 58'; Toivonen (yellow card) 84'; Manolev (yellow card) 95'; Matavž 103', 114'; Isaksson (yellow card) 120+3'	Stadium: De Grolsch Veste; Attendance: 30,000; Referee: Pieter Vink

31 January 2012 Quarter-finals	PSV	3 – 2	NEC	Eindhoven
20:45 CET (UTC+1)	Mertens 5'; Toivonen (yellow card) 31'; Matavž 41'; Strootman 43'	Report	George (yellow card) 8'; Van der Velden 15'; Schöne 45+1'; Goossens (yellow card) 81'	Stadium: Philips Stadion; Attendance: 11,000; Referee: Danny Makkelie

21 March 2012 Semi-finals	Heerenveen	1 – 3	PSV	Heerenveen
20:45 CET (UTC+1)	Elm 34'; Zomer (yellow card) 43'	Report	Labyad (yellow card) 17', (goal) 23'; Wijnaldum 46'; Matavž 50'; Mertens (yellow card) 60'; Bouma (yellow card) 79'	Stadium: Abe Lenstra Stadion; Attendance: 26,000; Referee: Bas Nijhuis

8 April 2012 Final	PSV	3 – 0	Heracles Almelo	Rotterdam
18:00 CEST (UTC+2)	Toivonen 31', (yellow card) 69'; Pieters (yellow card) 40'; Mertens 56'; Labyad (yellow card) 62'; Lens 63'	Report	Rienstra (yellow card) 61'	Stadium: De Kuip; Attendance: 50,000; Referee: Van Boekel

=== UEFA Europa League ===
==== Play-off round ====
18 August 2011 1st leg	SV Ried (Austria)	0 – 0	(Netherlands) PSV	Ried im Innkreis, Austria
21:05 CEST (UTC+2)	Ziegl (yellow card) 54'; Hinum (yellow card) 71'	Report	Manolev (yellow card) 43'	Stadium: Keine Sorgen Arena; Attendance: 5,740; Referee: Peter Rasmussen (Denmark)

25 August 2011 2nd leg	PSV (Netherlands)	5 – 0 (5 – 0 agg.)	(Austria) Ried	Eindhoven, Netherlands
18:45 CEST (UTC+2)	Toivonen 53'; Lens 67'; Wijnaldum 74'; Labyad 79'; Strootman 90'	Report	Hadžić (yellow card) 54'; Hinum (yellow card) 18'	Stadium: Philips Stadion; Attendance: 23,000; Referee: Maksim Layushkin (Russia)

==== Group stage ====
Pos	Team	Pld	W	D	L	GF	GA	GD	Pts	Qualification
1	(Netherlands) PSV Eindhoven	6	5	1	0	13	5	+8	16	Advance to knockout phase
2	(Poland) Legia Warsaw	6	3	0	3	7	9	−2	9	Advance to knockout phase
3	(Israel) Hapoel Tel Aviv	6	2	1	3	10	9	+1	7	
4	(Romania) Rapid București	6	1	0	5	5	12	−7	3	

Source: Soccerway

15 September 2011 1	PSV (Netherlands)	1 – 0	(Poland) Legia Warsaw	Eindhoven, Netherlands
19:00 CEST (UTC+2)	Mertens 21', (yellow card) 36'	Report	Borysiuk (yellow card) 3'	Stadium: Philips Stadion; Attendance: 13,000; Referee: István Vad (Hungary)

29 September 2011 2	Rapid București (Romania)	1 – 3	(Netherlands) PSV	Bucharest^{1}, Romania
21:05 CEST (UTC+2)	Alexa 28', (yellow card) 43'; Pancu (yellow card) 45+1'; Deac (yellow card) 56'; Duarte (yellow card) 85'	Report	Bouma 43'; Strootman (yellow card) 52'; Mertens (yellow card) 80'; Toivonen 89'; Matavž 90+2'	Stadium: Stadionul Național; Attendance: 21,320; Referee: Fredy Fautrel (France)

20 October 2011 3	Hapoel Tel Aviv (Israel)	0 – 1	(Netherlands) PSV	Tel Aviv, Israel
21:05 CEST (UTC+2)	Oremuš (yellow card) 68'; Pečalka (yellow card) 69'; Abutbul (yellow card) 85'	Report	Wijnaldum 70' (pen.); Toivonen (yellow card) 86'	Stadium: Bloomfield Stadium; Attendance: 9,468; Referee: Sergei Karasev (Russia)

3 November 2011 4	PSV (Netherlands)	3 – 3	(Israel) Hapoel Tel Aviv	Eindhoven, Netherlands
19:00 CET (UTC+1)	Wijnaldum 12'; Willems (yellow card) 47'; Toivonen 59', (yellow card) 88'; Strootman (yellow card) 85', (goal) 87'	Report	Damari 10', (yellow card) 50'; Shish (yellow card) 13'; Tamuz 33', 47'; Gordana (yellow card) 43' (yellow-red card) 72'; Khutaba (yellow card) 67'; Badir (yellow card) 73'; Fransman (yellow card) 79'; Igiebor (yellow card) 89'	Stadium: Philips Stadion; Attendance: 23,500; Referee: Stuart Attwell (England)

30 November 2011 5	Legia Warsaw (Poland)	0 – 3	(Netherlands) PSV	Warsaw, Poland
21:05 CET (UTC+1)	Kuciak (red card) 56'; Jędrzejczyk (yellow card) 82'	Report	Willems (yellow card) 25'; Żewłakow 32' (o.g.); Mertens (yellow card) 54', (goal) 59' (pen.); Engelaar (yellow card) 63'; Marcelo (yellow card) 67'; Labyad 68'; Strootman (yellow card) 90'	Stadium: Pepsi Arena; Attendance: 28,786; Referee: Fırat Aydınus (Turkey)

15 December 2011 6	PSV (Netherlands)	2 – 1	(Romania) Rapid București	Eindhoven, Netherlands
19:00 CET (UTC+1)	Marzo (yellow card) 65'; Manolev 75', (yellow card) 90+2'; Matavž 79'	Report	Duarte (yellow card) 32'; Alexa (yellow card) 86'; Teixeira (yellow card) 87'; Pancu 90+2'	Stadium: Philips Stadion; Attendance: 27,000; Referee: Simon Lee Evans (Wales)

==== Knock-out stage ====
16 February 2012 Round of 32 1st leg	Trabzonspor (Turkey)	1 – 2	(Netherlands) PSV	Trabzon, Turkey
21:05 CET (UTC+1)	Balcı (yellow card) 20'; Adın 33'; Akgün (yellow card) 66'; Kaçar (yellow card) 87'	Report	Matavž 6'; Toivonen 12'	Stadium: Hüseyin Avni Aker Stadium; Attendance: 18,866; Referee: Felix Brych (Germany)

23 February 2012 Round of 32 2nd leg	PSV (Netherlands)	4 – 1 (6 – 2 agg.)	(Turkey) Trabzonspor	Eindhoven, Netherlands
19:00 CET (UTC+1)	Mertens 15' (pen.); Marcelo (yellow card) 20'; Matavž 31', 53'; Strootman 38'	Report	Čelůstka (yellow card) 14'; Yılmaz 43'; Zengin (red card) 44'	Stadium: Philips Stadion; Attendance: 18,300; Referee: Tony Chapron (France)

8 March 2012 Round of 16 1st leg	Valencia (Spain)	4 – 2	(Netherlands) PSV	Valencia, Spain
21:05 CET (UTC+1)	Ruiz 11'; Manolev 13' (o.g.); Soldado 43' (pen.), (yellow card) 59'; Rami (yellow card) 45'; Piatti 56'; Barragán (yellow card) 58'	Report	Mertens (yellow card) 49'; Pieters (yellow card) 55'; Toivonen 83' (pen.); Wijnaldum 90'	Stadium: Mestalla Stadium; Attendance: 30,000; Referee: Manuel Gräfe (Germany)

15 March 2012 Round of 16 2nd leg	PSV (Netherlands)	1 – 1 (3 – 5 agg.)	(Spain) Valencia	Eindhoven, Netherlands
19:00 CET (UTC+1)	Manolev (yellow card) 5'; Toivonen 64', (yellow card) 88'; Bouma (yellow card) 71'; Lens (yellow card) 90+3'	Report	Rami 47', (red card) 88'; Bruno (yellow card) 57'; Alba (yellow card) 74'; Aduriz (yellow card) 78'; Mathieu (yellow card) 84'; Alves (yellow card) 88'	Stadium: Philips Stadion; Attendance: 22,000; Referee: William Collum (Scotland)

== Statistics ==
As of match played 6 May 2012

=== Appearances and goals ===
No.	Pos	Nat	Player	Total		Eredivisie		KNVB Cup		Europa League	
No.	Pos	Nat	Player	Apps	Goals	Apps	Goals	Apps	Goals	Apps	Goals
1	GK	(Sweden) SWE	Andreas Isaksson	33	0	22	0	2	0	9	0
2	DF	(Bulgaria) BUL	Stanislav Manolev	40	3	24	1	4	1	11+1	1
3	DF	(Netherlands) NED	Wilfred Bouma	41	2	21+6	1	3+1	0	7+3	1
4	DF	(Brazil) BRA	Marcelo	48	2	29+1	2	6	0	11+1	0
5	DF	(Netherlands) NED	Erik Pieters	25	0	13+3	0	2	0	5+2	0
6	MF	(Netherlands) NED	Kevin Strootman	46	6	30	2	5	1	10+1	3
7	FW	(Sweden) SWE	Ola Toivonen	49	27	33	18	4	3	10+2	6
8	MF	(Netherlands) NED	Orlando Engelaar	20	1	3+10	1	1+2	0	3+1	0
9	FW	(Slovenia) SLO	Tim Matavž	42	20	24+4	11	4+1	4	9	5
10	MF	(Netherlands) NED	Georginio Wijnaldum	50	15	32	9	6	2	10+2	4
11	MF	(Netherlands) NED	Jeremain Lens	50	11	20+13	9	4+1	1	7+5	1
13	DF	(Canada) CAN	Atiba Hutchinson	21	0	12+2	0	2+1	0	3+1	0
14	FW	(Belgium) BEL	Dries Mertens	49	27	33	21	4+1	3	11	3
15	MF	(Belgium) BEL	Stijn Wuytens	3	0	0+2	0	0+1	0	0	0
17	DF	(Netherlands) NED	Abel Tamata	12	0	3+6	0	1	0	1+1	0
18	DF	(Belgium) BEL	Timothy Derijck	28	0	17+3	0	2	0	5+1	0
19	FW	(Netherlands) NED	Jan Vennegoor of Hesselink	21	2	0+19	2	0+1	0	0+1	0
20	MF	(Morocco) MAR	Zakaria Labyad	48	13	26+6	6	4+2	5	8+2	2
21	GK	(Poland) POL	Przemysław Tytoń	18	0	12	0	3	0	3	0
22	FW	(Netherlands) NED	Memphis Depay	11	4	0+8	3	1+2	1	0	0
23	MF	(Belgium) BEL	Funso Ojo	10	0	2+3	0	2	0	1+2	0
24	DF	(Austria) AUT	Marcel Ritzmaier	3	0	0	0	0+1	0	1+1	0
27	DF	(Belgium) BEL	Stefano Marzo	1	0	0	0	1	0	0	0
33	GK	(Morocco) MAR	Khalid Sinouh	2	0	0+1	0	1	0	0	0
35	DF	(Netherlands) NED	Maikel Verkoelen	3	0	0+1	0	0+1	0	0+1	0
42	FW	(Netherlands) NED	Jürgen Locadia	2	1	0	0	1+1	1	0	0
43	DF	(Netherlands) NED	Jetro Willems	27	1	18	1	3	0	6	0
Players away from the club on loan:
28	MF	(Netherlands) NED	Otman Bakkal	1	0	0+1	0	0	0	0	0
Players who left PSV during the season:
16	MF	(Nigeria) NGR	Rabiu Ibrahim	4	1	0+2	0	1+1	1	0	0

=== Goal scorers ===
Place	Position	Nation	Number	Name	Eredivisie	KNVB Cup	Europa League	Total
1	FW	(Belgium)	14	Dries Mertens	21	3	3	27
1	FW	(Sweden)	7	Ola Toivonen	18	3	6	27
3	FW	(Slovenia)	9	Tim Matavž	11	4	5	20
4	MF	(Netherlands)	10	Georginio Wijnaldum	9	2	4	15
5	MF	(Morocco)	20	Zakaria Labyad	6	5	2	13
6	FW	(Netherlands)	11	Jeremain Lens	9	1	1	11
7	MF	(Netherlands)	6	Kevin Strootman	2	1	3	6
8	FW	(Netherlands)	22	Memphis Depay	3	1	0	4
9	DF	(Bulgaria)	2	Stanislav Manolev	1	1	1	3
10	DF	(Brazil)	4	Marcelo	2	0	0	2
10	FW	(Netherlands)	19	Jan Vennegoor of Hesselink	2	0	0	2
10	DF	(Netherlands)	3	Wilfred Bouma	1	0	1	2
13	MF	(Netherlands)	8	Orlando Engelaar	1	0	0	1
13	DF	(Netherlands)	43	Jetro Willems	1	0	0	1
13	FW	(Netherlands)	42	Jürgen Locadia	0	1	0	1
13	MF	(Nigeria)	16	Rabiu Ibrahim	0	1	0	1
13				Own goal	0	0	1	1
				TOTALS	87	22	27	136

=== Disciplinary record ===
Number	Nation	Position	Name	Eredivisie		KNVB Cup		Europa League		Total	
Number	Nation	Position	Name	Yellow card	Red card	Yellow card	Red card	Yellow card	Red card	Yellow card	Red card
1	(Sweden)	GK	Andreas Isaksson	0	0	1	0	0	0	1	0
2	(Bulgaria)	DF	Stanislav Manolev	11	2	1	0	3	0	15	2
3	(Netherlands)	DF	Wilfred Bouma	3	0	1	0	1	0	5	0
4	(Brazil)	DF	Marcelo	7	0	0	0	2	0	9	0
5	(Netherlands)	DF	Erik Pieters	4	0	1	0	1	0	6	0
6	(Netherlands)	MF	Kevin Strootman	5	1	1	0	3	0	9	1
7	(Sweden)	FW	Ola Toivonen	7	0	3	0	3	0	13	0
8	(Netherlands)	MF	Orlando Engelaar	1	0	0	0	1	0	2	0
9	(Slovenia)	FW	Tim Matavž	1	0	0	0	0	0	1	0
10	(Netherlands)	MF	Georginio Wijnaldum	2	0	0	0	0	0	2	0
11	(Netherlands)	FW	Jeremain Lens	7	1	0	0	1	0	8	1
13	(Canada)	DF	Atiba Hutchinson	2	0	0	0	0	0	2	0
14	(Belgium)	MF	Dries Mertens	4	0	1	0	4	0	9	0
18	(Belgium)	DF	Timothy Derijck	1	0	0	0	0	0	1	0
20	(Morocco)	MF	Zakaria Labyad	6	0	2	0	0	0	8	0
23	(Belgium)	DF	Funso Ojo	2	0	1	0	0	0	3	0
27	(Belgium)	DF	Stefano Marzo	0	0	0	0	1	0	1	0
43	(Netherlands)	DF	Jetro Willems	3	0	0	0	2	0	5	0
			TOTALS	66	4	12	0	22	0	100	4
