= Emenike =

Emenike // is a Nigerian male given and surname meaning “do not engage the world forcefully”.

People who the name refers to include:

- Alexander Emenike Nkume, (born 1989), Nigerian football player
- Emenike Uchenna Mbachu (born 1989), Nigerian-born football winger
- Emmanuel Emenike (born 1987), Nigerian football player
- Uzoechi Emenike (born 1994), English singer
