= Jürgen Locadia =

Curaçaoan footballer (born 1993)

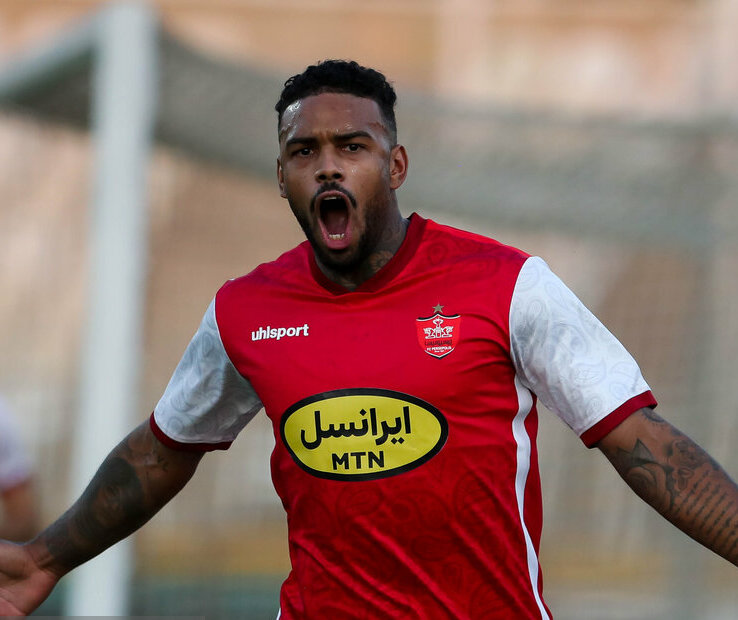
- Locadia with Persepolis in 2022

Personal information
- Full name: Jürgen Leonardo Locadia
- Date of birth: 7 November 1993 (age 33)
- Place of birth: Emmen, Netherlands
- Height: 1.93 m (6 ft 4 in)
- Positions: Striker; winger

Team information
- Current team: Tampa Bay Rowdies
- Number: 19

Youth career
- 1998–2001: Bargeres
- 2001–2004: Emmen
- 2004–2008: Emmen
- 2009: Sarto
- 2009–2010: Willem II
- 2010–2012: PSV

Senior career*
Years	Team	Apps	(Gls)
2011–2018	PSV	127	(45)
2018–2022	Brighton & Hove Albion	35	(3)
2019–2020	→ Hoffenheim (loan)	11	(4)
2020–2021	→ FC Cincinnati (loan)	26	(2)
2022	Bochum	11	(2)
2022	Persepolis	9	(6)
2023	Cangzhou Mighty Lions	24	(7)
2024	Amorebieta	4	(0)
2024–2025	Intercity	24	(10)
2026	Miami FC	18	(8)
2026–	Tampa Bay Rowdies	2	(0)

International career^{‡}
2009–2011	Netherlands U17	11	(8)
2010	Netherlands U18	1	(1)
2010–2012	Netherlands U19	13	(3)
2012	Netherlands U20	3	(0)
2013–2014	Netherlands U21	7	(1)
2023–	Curaçao	20	(2)
- * Club domestic league appearances and goals as of 21:19, September 27, 2026 (UTC) ‡ National team caps and goals as of 21:53, 4 October 2026 (UTC)

Jürgen Leonardo Locadia (born 7 November 1993) is a professional footballer who plays as a striker who currently plays for Tampa Bay Rowdies in the USL Championship. Born in the Netherlands, he plays for the Curaçao national team.

== Club career ==
=== Early career ===
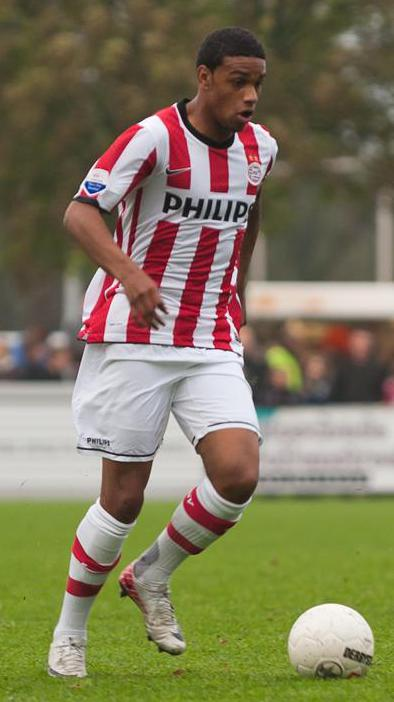
Locadia in his debut for PSV Eindhoven in a KNVB Cup match in September 2011

Locadia, who is of Curaçaoan descent, was born in Emmen, Netherlands, and began playing football with club VV Bargeres, before being discovered by the youth team of FC Emmen. He later said his passion of football began from his uncle, Jerry, who also played football, and took him to street football and FC Emmen matches. Locadia was offered a spot on Willem II, and his whole family resettled in Tilburg.

He was at Willem II for a year when Locadia joined PSV Eindhoven on 11 June 2010, signing a two–year contract. Locadia would that season be assigned to Jong PSV, making an impact when they won Beloften Eredivisie and earned a spot in the first team squad in the 2011–12 season. Locadia continued with the first squad and maintain his goal scoring form. Dutch media Voetbal International reported that he agreed to sign a three–year professional contract with the club. On 27 January 2012, it was confirmed that Locadia signed a contract with PSV Eindhoven.

Locadia started off the Jong PSV 2012–13 season well making 11 goals in the first six matches, including two braces and a hat–trick. With his first team opportunities coming from the substitute bench, Locadia returned to Jong PSV on 26 November 2012 against Feyenoord U21 and scored twice, in a 5–4 win. He later scored five more goals for the Jong side, including a hat–trick against Jong NEC Nijmegen on 19 February 2013.

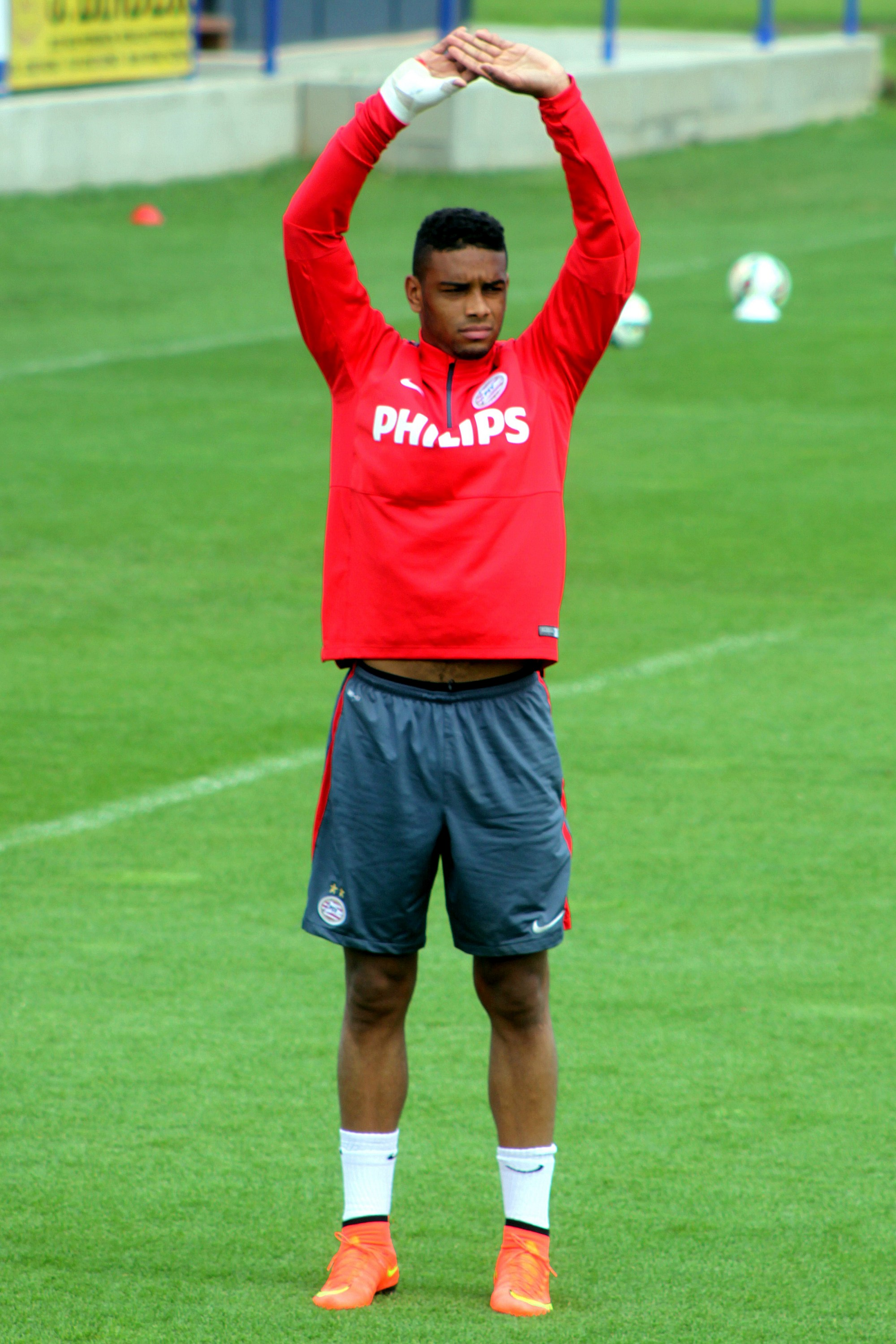
Locadia training ahead of practice at PSV Eindhoven's training camp in Bad Erlach

=== PSV Eindhoven ===
Following his performance in the 2011 Otten Cup, Manager Fred Rutten praised his performance, saying: "Locadia is a goal-scoring machine. He has surprised us in a positive way. He is very fast." Meanwhile, PSV Eindhoven's technical manager Marcel Brands hinted of calling up Locadia into the first team. On 21 September 2011, he made his first appearance for PSV in a KNVB Cup match against VVSB, coming on as a substitute for Tim Matavž in the 72nd minute, and scored the club's sixth goal in the 80th minute, winning 8–0. After the match, Manager Rutten said he would call up Locadia and teammate Memphis Depay to the first team, as long as, they perform well. Locadia made his first start for PSV in the following round against FC Lisse on 27 October 2011, as the club won 3–0. At the end of the 2011–12 season, he went on to make two appearances and scoring once in all competitions.

Ahead of the 2012–13 season, Locadia was included in the PSV Eindhoven's pre–season tour in Poland after being called up Manager Dick Advocaat and helped the club win the Polish Masters. He was also handed the shirt number 19 for the first team. It was reported in August 2012 that Manager Advocaat was planning to loan out the player to get more playing time, but PSV Eindhoven's technical manager Marcel Brands decided to keep him. Locadia made his first appearance of the season as a starter in a KNVB Cup match against Achilles '29 on 27 September 2012 and he scored the second goal in the 3–0 win over the third-tier team. Three days later on 30 September 2012, Locadia made his Eredivisie debut against VVV-Venlo, entering the pitch in Venlo as a substitute in the 68th minute, and with only 22 minutes left in the game, he managed to score three goals in the 6–0 win over VVV-Venlo. Locadia became the first player to score a hat-trick in his Eredivisie debut since Harald Berg scored three goals in his debut game on 10 August 1969. A week after his debut hat-trick, Locadia was promoted to the first team and signed a new five-year contract with PSV which will keep him at the club until 2017. His performance led Manager Advocaat praising his attitude, saying: "Locadia is very confident. He is not easily fooled." Locadia made his UEFA Europa League debut, coming on as a 65th-minute substitute, in a 1–0 loss against AIK on 8 November 2012. He then scored his fourth goal of the season, in a 6–1 win against NAC Breda on 22 December 2012. His next goal came on 2 February 2013 against ADO Den Haag when Locadia scored PSV Eindhoven's fifth goal of the game, in a 7–0 win. Three weeks later on 27 February 2013, he scored three goals in a 3–0 win over PEC Zwolle in the KNVB Cup semi-final. However, Locadia suffered a with tonsils problems while on international duty and was sidelined for a month after undergoing a surgery. He didn't make his return to the first team against NEC Nijmegen on 5 May 2013 and scored his fifth goal of the season, in a 4–2 win, helping the club finish second place in the league. Four days later in the final of the KNVB Beker against AZ Alkmaar on 9 May 2013, Locadia scored his sixth goal of the season, in a 2–1 loss. At the end of the 2012–13 season, Locadia went on to make twenty–two appearances and scoring eleven times in all competitions.

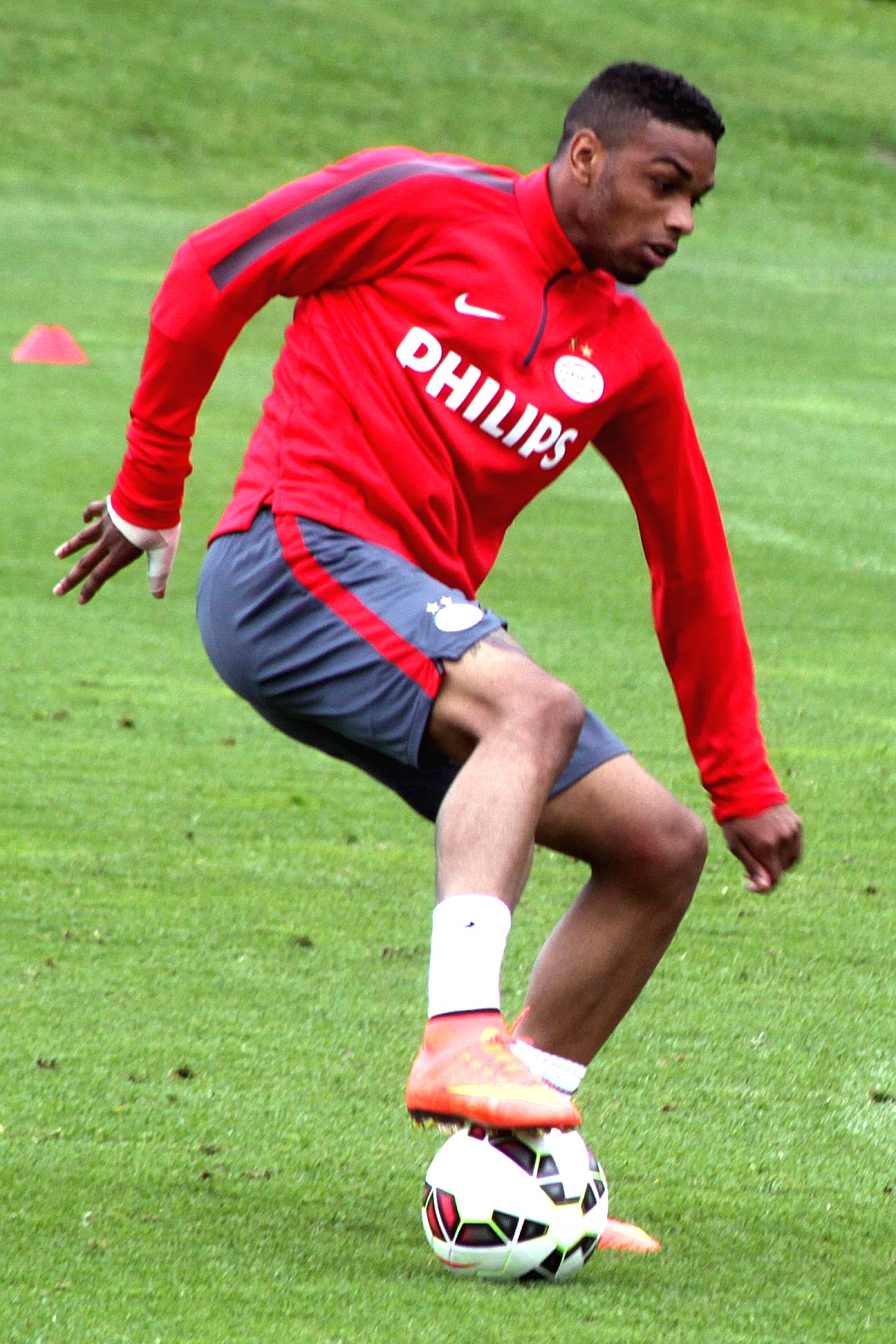
Locadia dribbling while training during practice at PSV Eindhoven's training camp in Bad Erlach

Ahead of the 2013–14 season, Locadia switched number shirt from nineteen to eleven following the departure of Jeremain Lens. He scored his first goal of the season, having come on as a 72nd-minute substitute, in a 2–0 win against Zulte Waregem in the third round qualifying round of the UEFA Champions League, in a 2–0 win. In the return leg, PSV Eindhoven progressed to the next round after winning 3–0. Three days later on 10 August 2013, Locadia provided a hat–trick assist, in a 5–0 win against NEC Nijmegen. Since the start of the 2013–14 season, he established himself in the first team as the club's first choice striker, which saw him competing with Tim Matavž. Locadia then scored his second hat–trick of his professional career when he helped PSV Eindhoven beat SC Telstar in the second round of the KNVB Beker on 25 September 2013. A week later on 6 October 2013 against RKC Waalwijk, Locadia scored the winning goal, just four minutes after coming on as a substitute, in a 2–1 win. He then provided a role against Vitesse on 6 December 2013 by setting up the club's two goals, in a 6–2 loss. This was followed up by scoring against FC Utrecht and ADO Den Haag (twice). Locadia then scored two goals in two matches between 5 February 2014 and 8 February 2014 against SC Cambuur and FC Twente. His goal scoring form continued when he scored five times in five consecutive matches throughout March. Locadia then scored his seventeenth goal of the season, in a 2–1 win against PEC Zwolle and helped PSV Eindhoven finish fourth place in the league. Despite sustaining injuries during the 2013–14 season, it didn't affect his playing time, as he went on to make forty–one appearances and scored seventeen times in all competitions.

Ahead of the 2014–15 season, Locadia switched number shirt from eleven to seventeen after switching numbers with teammate Luciano Narsingh. He played in both legs of the UEFA Europa League third round against St. Pölten and scored and assisted in the second leg, as PSV Eindhoven won 4–2 on aggregate to advance to the next round. Two days later on 9 August 2014, Locadia signed a contract extension with the club, keeping him until 2019. He then scored two goals in the first two matches of the season against Willem II and NAC Breda. Following a new signing of Luuk de Jong, Locadia began playing in the winger positions, which he was willing to play in the position. However, Locadia have to compete in the winger position, due to Depay being preferred in the same position he's playing in, resulting in him being placed on the substitute bench. At times, Locadia started in the forward position in the absence of De Jong or Manager Cocu's rotation change in a number of matches. However, he struggled to play in the position as a result, scoring four times including a brace against Almere City in the third round of the KNVB Beker. Locadia scored twice for the club, playing in the left–wing and right–wing positions against Go Ahead Eagles and Excelsior respectively. As a result, this led to speculation over his future at PSV Eindhoven, but he wanted to stay at the club. Despite this, Locadia later helped PSV Eindhoven win the league title for the first time since 2008 after beating SC Heerenveen 4–1 on 22 April 2015; it was the first major trophy of his professional career. At the end of the 2014–15 season, he went on to make thirty–six appearances and scoring six times in all competitions.

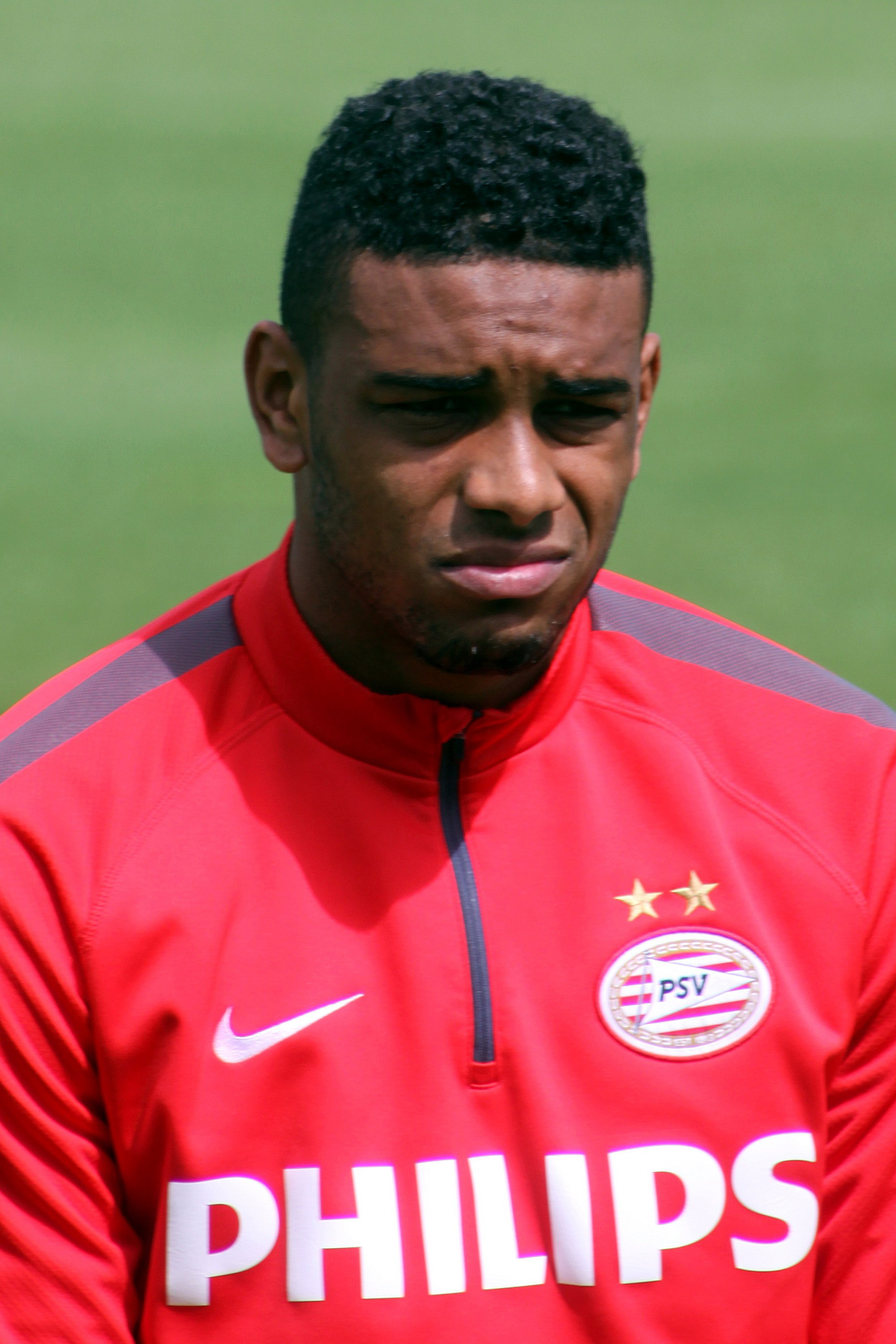
Locadia at PSV Eindhoven's training camp in Bad Erlach

Ahead of the 2015–16 season, Locadia was considering his future at PSV Eindhoven, due to his reduced playing time, and made it clear that he wanted to leave the club, having said that on two separate statements. However, both manager Cocu and technical manager Marcel Brands refused to let him go and wanted the player to stay at PSV Eindhoven on two separate statements. By mid–July, Locadia made a hint that he could stay at the club, as long as, getting more playing time, especially after the departure of Depay. Amid to his future at PSV Eindhoven, Locadia switched number shirt from seventeen to nineteen. He started in the Johan Cruijff Schaal against FC Groningen and played 74 minutes before being substituted, as the club won 3–0 to win the trophy. However, Locadia was dropped from the starting line–up for the next three matches until he apologised for his actions over his future at PSV Eindhoven and was fined by the club. He returned to the first team against Feyenoord on 30 August 2015, coming on as a 77th-minute substitute and scored his first goal of the season four minutes later, in a 3–1 win. This was followed up by scoring twice for PSV Eindhoven, in a 6–0 win against SC Cambuur. Locadia then scored two goals in two matches between 22 September 2015 and 26 September 2015 against SC Cambuur and NEC Nijmegen. Following this, he set up six goals in the next five league matches, including scoring against FC Twente. Locadia then scored his first UEFA Champions League goal, in a 2–0 win against VfL Wolfsburg on 3 November 2015. Following his return from suspension, he regained his first team place, playing in the winger positions. At times, Locadia also rotated in playing in the striker position as well. He then scored twice for PSV Eindhoven, in a 3–2 win against Heracles Almelo in the Round of 16 of the KNVB Beker on 16 December 2015. Locadia then set up two goals for the club, as PSV Eindhoven beat De Graafschap on 30 January 2016. Two weeks later on 14 February 2016, he scored and set up one of the club's goals, in a 3–0 win against NEC Nijmegen. Three weeks later on 5 March 2016, Locadia, once again, scored and set up one of PSV Eindhoven's goals, in a 3–0 win against FC Groningen. After suffering ankle injury while on international duty, he didn't make his return to the first team until on 16 April 2016 against Roda JC, coming on as an 84th-minute substitute, 3–0 win. In the last game of the season against PEC Zwolle, Locadia scored and set up a goal for De Jong, who scored twice, in a 3–1 win; a victory that saw the club win the league title for the second time in a row. Despite suffering injuries during the 2015–16 season, he went on to make forty–two appearances and scoring twelve times in all competitions.

Ahead of the 2016–17 season, Locadia was linked a move away from PSV Eindhoven, as Primeira Liga side Sporting CP wanted to sign him. However, the club refused to sell the player. Amid the transfer speculation, he started the whole game in the Johan Cruyff Shield against Feyenoord, as PSV Eindhoven won 1–0 to win the trophy for the second time in a row. In a follow–up match against FC Utrecht in the opening game of the season, Locadia made his 100th appearance for the club and set up PSV Eindhoven's equalising goal, in a 2–1 win. He made two more starts before suffering a groin injury during a match against FC Groningen on 28 August 2016 and was substituted in the 34th minute, as the club drew 0–0. After the match, it was announced that Locadia was sidelined for two months with a groin injury. By late October, he returned to training and made a recovery from the injury. While on the rehabilitation, however, Locadia suffered a knee injury and was sidelined for two months. While on the sidelines, PSV Eindhoven began negotiations with the player over a new contract. By early–February, he returned to training after making a recovery from the injury. Locadia returned to the first team against Feyenoord on 26 February 2017, coming on as an 84th-minute substitute, in a 2–1 loss. Following his return, he found his playing time, mostly from the substitute bench. It was reported on 17 March 2017 that Locadia then signed a contract extension with the club, keeping him until 2020. He scored his first goal of the season, in a 2–0 win against Sparta Rotterdam on 1 April 2017. This was followed up by scoring against FC Twente. Two weeks later on 23 April 2017, Locadia scored from a direct kick to beat rivals, Ajax. However, PSV Eindhoven failed to defend the title, ending their two seasons defence after they finished third place in the league. At the end of the 2016–17 season, he went on to make fifteen appearances and scoring three times in all competitions.

Locadia began the 2017–18 season for PSV in good form, rotating in the striker and winger positions. He then scored his first goal of the season, as well as, setting up a goal for Hirving Lozano, in a 2–0 win against Roda JC on 27 August 2017. Locadia was investigated by the KNVB committee after he allegedly spat Denzel Dumfries, which was caught on camera during the club's 3–0 loss against SC Heerenveen on 10 September 2017. After the investigation was conducted, Locadia was cleared by the committee. Two weeks later on 24 September 2017, he scored four goals in a 7–1 victory against FC Utrecht. After the match, Locadia was named Team of the Week by Voetbal International and Algemeen Dagblad. Three weeks later on 15 October 2017, he scored his sixth goal of the season, in a 5–2 win against VVV-Venlo. Locadia then scored three goals in two matches between 29 October 2017 and 5 November 2017 against Vitesse (twice) and Twente. However, during a 3–0 loss against Ajax on 10 December 2017, he suffered a hamstring injury and was substituted in the 12th minute. After the match, it was announced that Locadia was out for at least six to eight weeks. Up until his injury, he played regularly, scoring nine goals and assisting six in 15 league games (making eighteen appearances in all competitions). Despite his departure, his contributions to PSV Eindhoven in the 2017–18 season saw the club become champions once again.

Throughout the summer transfer window, Locadia agreed to a move to Premier League side Wolverhampton Wanderers for worth £10 million. However, PSV Eindhoven pulled out a deal at the last minutes after they decided to keep him at the club. It was reported on 18 January 2018 that Premier League club Brighton & Hove Albion agreed to sign Locadia. After leaving PSV Eindhoven, he returned to the Philips Stadion and was given a farewell sendoff following an end to the club's match.

=== Brighton & Hove Albion ===
On 18 January 2018, Premier League club Brighton & Hove Albion agreed a reported £15 million total fee with PSV for the transfer of Locadia, with £10 million being paid upfront along with £5 million in add-ons. He signed a four-and-a-half-year contract with the Seagulls the next day, and was given the number 25 shirt. Upon signing he reunited with former PSV teammate Davy Pröpper, who joined Brighton in the 2017 summer transfer window.

Due to his injury sustained at PSV Eindhoven, his debut was delayed for a month. On 17 February 2018, Locadia scored on his Brighton debut in a 3–1 FA Cup fifth round win against Coventry City. He scored on his Premier League debut a week later on 24 February, netting from close range in the 90th minute of a 4–1 victory against Swansea City, after coming on as a second-half substitute. However, since joining the club, Locadia found his playing time, mostly coming from the substitute bench. As a result, he only made four starts for Brighton. At the end of the 2017–18 season, Locadia went on to make eight appearances and scoring two times in all competitions. Following this, Manager Chris Hughton expected to see the player get used more often next season.

Ahead of the 2018–19 season, he was given a number nine shirt following the departure of Sam Baldock. However at the start of the 2018–19 season, Locadia found his playing time, mostly coming from the substitute bench once again, due to his fitness concern. By November, he said in an interview with De Telegraaf and expressed his desire to leave Brighton & Hove Albion after receiving lack of first team opportunities. This led Manager Hughton respond to his comment, saying that Locadia's statement was taken out of context, though he understood that the player wanted to play more. Amid to his future at the club, he scored his first goal of the season, equalising Brighton's first goal of the game, in a 1–1 draw against Arsenal on 26 December 2018. In a follow–up match against Everton, Locadia played the whole match and scored the winning goal, in a 1–0 win. As a result, he announced his intention to stay at the club beyond the 2018–19 season. Two months later on 16 February 2019, Locadia scored the winning goal when he tap in the rebound after Yves Bissouma had hit the post with a shot from the edge of the box, in a 2–1 win against Derby County to advance to the next round of the FA Cup. On 17 March 2019, Locadia scored in the FA Cup quarter final away against Millwall. His goal gave Brighton a lifeline putting them just a goal behind at The Den. A few minutes later Solly March scored a last gasp free kick making it 2–2 and to take it to extra time. The game stayed level throughout extra time and Brighton went to win on penalties 5–4 (in which Locadia and March both scored in) to take them to Wembley. Despite receiving more playing time, Locadia, however, continued to fail to score more goals for the rest of the 2018–19 season, as the club avoided relegation. Despite suffering from injuries further, he went on to make thirty–three appearances and scoring four times in all competitions at the end of the 2018–19 season.

Having made two appearances for The Seagulls at the start of the 2019–20 season, Locadia was told by new Manager Graham Potter that he can leave the club, as his first team opportunities was expected to be limited.

==== 1899 Hoffenheim (loan) ====
It was announced on 29 August 2019 that Locadia signed for Bundesliga side Hoffenheim on a season-long loan.

Two days later on 31 August 2019, he made his debut coming on as a substitute in a 0–0 away draw against Bayer 04 Leverkusen. However, Locadia missed one match due to an abdominal Influenza. He returned to the first team, coming on as a 68th-minute substitute, in a 3–0 loss against Borussia Mönchengladbach on 28 September 2019. Locadia then scored three goals in three consecutive matches between 26 October 2019 and 8 November 2019 against Hertha BSC, SC Paderborn and 1. FC Köln. Following this, he stated his desire to stay at the club by turning a move into a permanent deal. A month later on 13 December 2019, Locadia scored his fourth goal for 1899 Hoffenheim, in a 4–2 loss against FC Augsburg. Seven days later on 20 December 2019 against Borussia Dortmund, he set up the club's equalising goal, as 1899 Hoffenheim won 2–1. It was announced on 31 January 2020 that Locadia's loan spell at the club ended and returned to his parent club. By the time he left 1899 Hoffenheim, Locadia went on to make twelve appearances and scoring four times.

==== FC Cincinnati (loan) ====
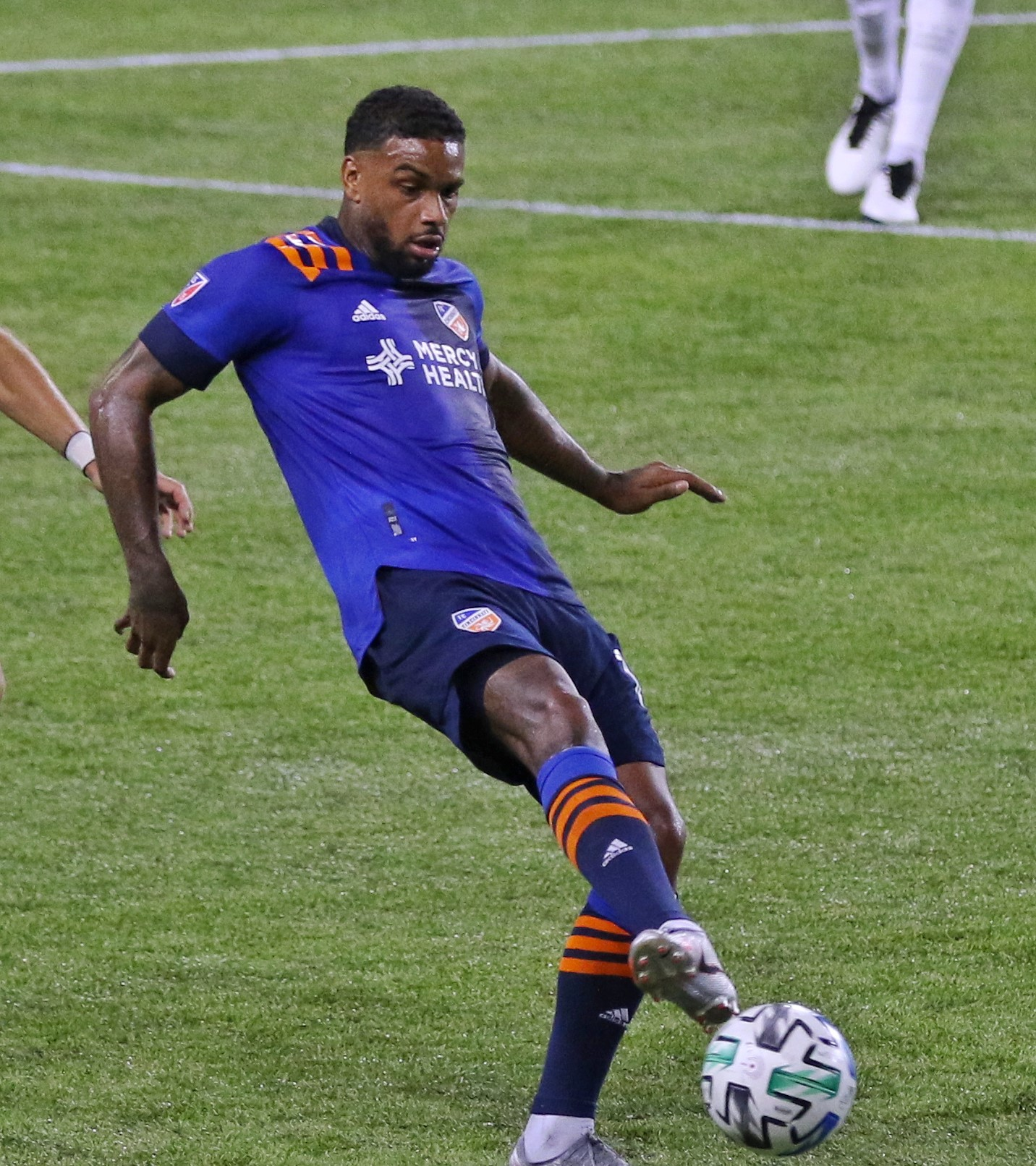
Locadia playing for FC Cincinnati in August 2020

On 3 February 2020, Locadia joined Major League Soccer side FC Cincinnati as a Designated Player on a five-month loan with an option to buy.

He made his MLS debut on 1 March 2020 in the season opener against the New York Red Bulls and scored his first goal in the 3–2 defeat. The season was suspended later that month due to the COVID-19 pandemic in North America, following the cancellation of several matches. FC Cincinnati announced on 19 June 2020 that his loan spell was extended for the rest of the 2020 season. Locadia suffered a quad injury that keep him out for several weeks during preparations for the league's resumption of play. In the MLS is Back Tournament against the Portland Timbers on 28 July 2020, he returned to the first team from injury as a substitute in the 74th minute and scored his second goal for the club by converting a penalty in the 81st minute. The goal tied the match at 1-1 and helped send Cincinnati to a penalty shootout, but Locadia had his shot blocked; Cincinnati lost 4–2 in the shootout and was eliminated from the tournament's knockout stage.

Locadia regained his first team place as the club's first choice striker as regular season play resumed. In September, he stated his frustration at being unable to score goals. Locadia suffered a hamstring injury during a 3–0 loss against Philadelphia Union on 7 October 2020 and missed three matches as a result. He then made his return to the first team against Minnesota United on 25 October 2020, coming on as a 58th-minute substitute in a 1–0 loss. By the end of the 2020 season, Locadia had made seventeen appearances and scored once in all competitions.

Ahead of the 2021 season, Locadia's loan spell with FC Cincinnati was extended until on 30 June 2021. On 18 June 2021, it was announced that Cincinnati would not make Locadia's loan move permanent.

==== Return to the Albion ====
He made his first Brighton appearance in over two years on 22 September 2021, coming on as a 76th-minute substitute for double goalscorer Aaron Connolly in the 2–0 home victory over Swansea City in the EFL Cup third round. Locadia made his first start for the club since his return on 27 October, playing the full match in the eventual penalty shootout defeat away at Leicester in the EFL Cup. Three days later, he made his return to a Premier League matchday squad where he remained as an unused substitute in a 2–2 away draw at Liverpool. He made his first Premier League appearance in over two years on 27 November, coming on as a 68th-minute substitute replacing Neal Maupay in the 0–0 home draw against Leeds United.

=== VfL Bochum ===
On 6 January 2022, Locadia joined Bundesliga side VfL Bochum on a free transfer, signing a contract until the end of the season. He made his debut 10 days later, coming on as substitute in the 1–0 away loss at Mainz 05.

=== Persepolis ===
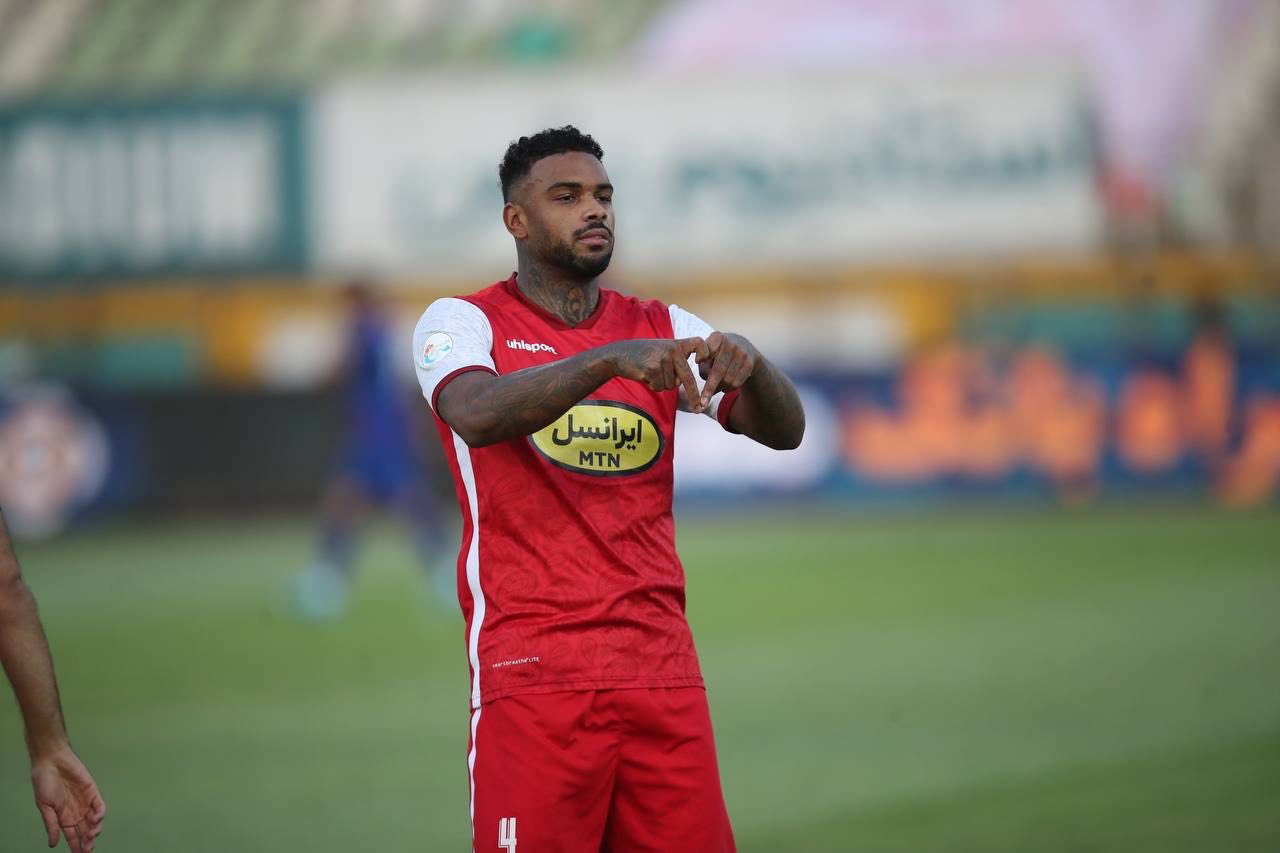
Locadia playing for Persepolis in September 2022

On 12 August 2022, Locadia joined Persian Gulf Pro League side Persepolis on a one-year deal. Locadia made his debut for the club on 26 August, in a 1–0 away win over Aluminium Arak in Persian Gulf Pro League. Locadia scored his first goal for Persepolis in a 2–0 victory over Naft Abadan on 31 August 2022. On 19 December, Locadia left Iran following the warnings from the Dutch government for its nationals not to remain in Iran during the Mahsa Amini protests.

=== Cangzhou Mighty Lions ===
On 10 April 2023, Locadia joined Chinese Super League club Cangzhou Mighty Lions.

=== Amorebieta ===
On 4 March 2024, Locadia joined Spanish club SD Amorebieta and returned to European football again.

=== Miami FC ===
On 19 December 2025, Locadia signed with second-tier USL Championship side Miami FC ahead of their upcoming 2026 season.

=== Tampa Bay Rowdies ===
On 10 September 2026, Tampa Bay Rowdies of the USL Championship announced they had acquired Locadia via transfer from Miami FC.

== International career ==
Locadia was eligible to play for either Netherlands or Curaçao, but he ended up playing for Netherlands instead. Due to his limited opportunities to represent his homeland, Curaçao manager Remko Bicentini hinted of making an effort of calling up Locadia and Patrick van Aanholt in March 2017. In October 2018, in an interview with De Tafel van Kees, Bicentini revealed that the player had thoughts of representing Curaçao.

=== Youth career ===
In September 2009, Locadia was called up to the Netherlands U17 for the first time. He scored his first goal on his U17 debut, in a 2–1 win against France U17 on 24 September 2009. Locadia later scored three more goals for Netherlands U17 by the end of the year. Locadia then scored twice in a match, as U17 team beat Ukraine U17 2–0 on 25 March 2010. This was followed up by scoring in a 2–1 win against Georgia U17. He went on to make eleven appearances and scoring eight times for Netherlands U17.

In November 2010, Locadia was called up to the Netherlands U18 squad for the first time. He scored on his U18 team debut, as Netherlands U18 beat Romania U18 on 17 November 2010. This turns out to be Locadia only appearances for the U18 side.

In August 2010, Locadia was called up to the Netherlands U19 squad but was placed on standby squad. Two months later on 1 October 2010, he was called up to the U19 squad. Locadia made his Netherlands U19 debut, coming on as a 73rd-minute substitute, in a 2–0 win against Slovenia U19 on 7 October 2010. In a follow–up match, he made his first start for the U19 side, as Netherlands U19 beat Slovakia U19 2–0. After a three-month absence, Locadia was called up to the Netherlands U19 squad once again and made an appearance for the U19 side against France U19. His first goal for the Netherlands U19 came on 25 May 2012 against Norway U19 and scored twice in a 2–1 win. This was followed up by scoring his third goal for the U19 team, in a 3–0 win against Czech Republic U19. He went on to make thirteen appearances and scoring three times for the Netherlands U19.

In August 2012, Locadia was called up to the Netherlands U20 for the first time. He made his debut for the U20 side, coming on as a second-half substitute, in a 2–1 loss against Turkey U20 on 8 September 2012. Locadia later made two more appearances for Netherlands U20, totalling three appearances for the U20 side.

In January 2013, Locadia was called up to the Netherlands U21 squad for the first time. He scored on his U21 debut against Croatia U21 on 5 February 2013 and helped Netherlands U21 win 3–2. Locadia was shortlisted for the U21 squad for the UEFA European Under-21 Championship, as he expected to be included in the squad for the tournament. However, Locadia suffered a groin injury during a 3–1 win against Australia U20 on 24 May 2013 and was replaced by Danny Hoesen. Despite this, he later made four more appearances for Netherlands U21 by the end of the year, including a red card against Slovakia U21 on 14 November 2013. Locadia made two more appearances for the U21 side throughout 2014, totalling his Netherlands U21 appearance to seven.

=== Senior career ===
In May 2014, Locadia was initially in a shortlist for the senior Netherlands squad for the FIFA World Cup in Brazil. However, he suffered a groin injury while training for the national team and was replaced by Marco van Ginkel. The following November, Locadia received his first call-up to the Netherlands squad for the first time. He was called up again in March 2016 for friendlies against France and England. However, Locadia had to pull out with an injury. Throughout 2016 and 2017, he later pulled from the national team squad on three occasions, due to his recurring injury problems. In September 2017, Locadia was called up to the Netherlands squad but appeared as an unused substitute against Belarus and Sweden.

On 18 May 2026, he was named by head coach Dick Advocaat in the 26-man squad for the 2026 FIFA World Cup, marking the country's first-ever appearance at the tournament.

== Style of play ==
When Locadia started playing football, he didn't play as a striker, saying: "I used to be an offside player. In the C-youth the trainer put me at the center. For the time being that is going well for me." Wim Kieft said about Locadia's performance: "He has the qualities with his kicking technique to make at least fifteen to twenty and maybe even thirty in the premier division every year, provided he is used properly."

Manager Advocaat also praised Locadia's performance, calling him a "great striker". Teammate Georginio Wijnaldum was impressed with his performance, saying: "When he's finishing, everyone looks up to him. Jürgen scores very easily, the easiest of all of us. When we shoot after practice, he says: ‘'OK, I want it at the bottom right.'’ And then he also hits the ball at the bottom right. And hard huh. It's incredible that he can do that at such a young age". As Locadia was getting first team football at PSV Eindhoven, he said: "I am more playable than before and win more games. That is important for the team, which has time to join. I also feel better than at the start of the season. You have to prove every week that you belong. That starts with hard work. Defending starts at the front. It can be tough, because sometimes you end up on an island between two defenders and you walk from one to the other. Because you put all that energy into defending, you can miss just that one percent freshness in the finish. You have to find balance in that." Manager Phillip Cocu said that his performance is improving and getting better and better, as well as, his development in the position Locadia played in. However, he later criticised the player for his lack of emotions while under better control.

Locadia acknowledged that he doesn't do headers, saying: "I wanted to head it diagonally, but I'm not good at headers. I need to practise, I don't like headers. I am better shooting than heading. Most of my goals in Holland were shots, not headers."

== Personal life ==
Locadia idolised Dimitar Berbatov and Ruud van Nistelrooy growing up and supported Manchester United. Growing up, however, his father left him when he was two years old, leaving his mother to raise him and three younger sisters. Because his mother didn't have a driving license, Locadia had to travel to the training ground by train when he was a youth prospect with Emmen and Willem II.

Locadia reflected on his childhood, saying: "We had no money and minimal resources. I always remember what she (his mother) has done for me. We were sometimes hungry. As a child you grow up quickly if your family is suffering. That hurt me and, as the only man in the family and the eldest of four, I felt a duty to my mother and sisters. I blamed myself. Meanwhile, I have forgiven myself for that time." He revealed that he had his first tattoos when he was fifteen and since have lots, including one of his late grandmother. Locadia later credited football as a way from a life of crime.

=== Musical career ===
Locadia is also known as a DJ and has cited Diplo and Major Lazer as his influences. In June 2017, he released his debut singles, "Take Off" and "Epok".

== Career statistics ==
=== Club ===
As of match played 19 September 2026

Appearances and goals by club, season and competition
Club	Season	League			National cup		League cup		Continental		Other		Total	
Club	Season	Division	Apps	Goals	Apps	Goals	Apps	Goals	Apps	Goals	Apps	Goals	Apps	Goals
PSV Eindhoven	2011–12	Eredivisie	0	0	2	1	—		0	0	—		2	1
PSV Eindhoven	2012–13	Eredivisie	15	6	5	5	—		2 (Note: Appearances in UEFA Europa League)	0	0	0	22	11
PSV Eindhoven	2013–14	Eredivisie	31	13	2	3	—		8 (Note: Three appearances one goal in UEFA Champions League, five appearances in Europa League)	1	—		41	17
PSV Eindhoven	2014–15	Eredivisie	23	6	3	2	—		10	1	—		36	9
PSV Eindhoven	2015–16	Eredivisie	29	8	4	3	—		8 (Note: Appearances in Champions League)	1	1 (Note: Appearance in Johan Cruyff Shield)	0	42	12
PSV Eindhoven	2016–17	Eredivisie	14	3	0	0	—		0	0	1	0	15	3
PSV Eindhoven	2017–18	Eredivisie	15	9	1	0	—		2	0	0	0	18	9
PSV Eindhoven	Total		127	45	17	14	—		30	3	2	0	176	62
Brighton & Hove Albion	2017–18	Premier League	6	1	2	1	—		—		—		8	2
Brighton & Hove Albion	2018–19	Premier League	26	2	6	2	1	0	—		—		33	4
Brighton & Hove Albion	2019–20	Premier League	2	0	0	0	0	0	—		—		2	0
Brighton & Hove Albion	2021–22	Premier League	1	0	0	0	2	0	—		—		3	0
Brighton & Hove Albion	Total		35	3	8	3	3	0	—		—		46	6
TSG Hoffenheim (loan)	2019–20	Bundesliga	11	4	1	0	—		—		—		12	4
FC Cincinnati (loan)	2020	MLS	17	1	0	0	—		—		1 (Note: Appearance in MLS is Back Tournament knockout stage)	1	18	2
FC Cincinnati (loan)	2021	MLS	9	1	0	0	—		—		—		9	1
FC Cincinnati (loan)	Total		26	2	0	0	—		—		1	1	27	3
VfL Bochum	2021–22	Bundesliga	11	2	2	0	—		—		—		13	2
Persepolis	2022–23	Persian Gulf Pro League	9	6	0	0	—		—		—		9	6
Cangzhou Mighty Lions	2023	Chinese Super League	24	7	0	0	—		—		—		24	7
Amorebieta	2023–24	Segunda División	4	0	—		—		—		—		4	0
Intercity	2024–25	Primera Federación	24	10	—		—		—		—		24	10
Miami FC	2026	USL Championship	18	8	4	2	—		—		—		22	10
Tampa Bay Rowdies	2026	USL Championship	2	0	0	0	—		—		—		2	0
Career total			291	87	32	19	3	0	30	3	3	1	359	110

=== International ===
As of match played 4 October 2026

Appearances and goals by national team and year
National team	Year	Apps	Goals
Curaçao	2023	2	1
Curaçao	2024	1	0
Curaçao	2025	9	0
Curaçao	2026	8	1
Total		20	2

Scores and results list Jamaica's goal tally first, score column indicates score after each Locadia goal.

List of international goals scored by Jürgen Locadia
No.	Date	Venue	Opponent	Score	Result	Competition
1	16 June 2023	DRV PNK Stadium, Fort Lauderdale, United States	Saint Kitts and Nevis	1–0	1–1 (2–3 p)	2023 CONCACAF Gold Cup qualification
2	27 September 2026	Ergilio Hato Stadium, Willemstad, Curaçao	Nicaragua	6–1	6–1	2026–27 CONCACAF Nations League A

== Honours ==
PSV

- Eredivisie: 2014–15, 2015–16
- KNVB Cup: 2011–12
- Johan Cruyff Shield: 2015, 2016

== Discography ==
=== EPs ===
List of extended plays, with selected details
Title	Details
Purple Art EP	Released: 23 July 2018; Label: Yeslo Music Group; Format: Digital download

=== Singles ===
List of singles, showing year released and album name
Title	Year	Album
"Take Off"	2017	Non-album singles
"Epok"	2017	Non-album singles
"Can't Let Go" (featuring Andrew Tejada)	2017	Non-album singles
"Eachoes"	2018	Purple Art EP
"On My Mind"	2018	Non-album single
