= Funso Ojo =

Belgian footballer (born 1991)

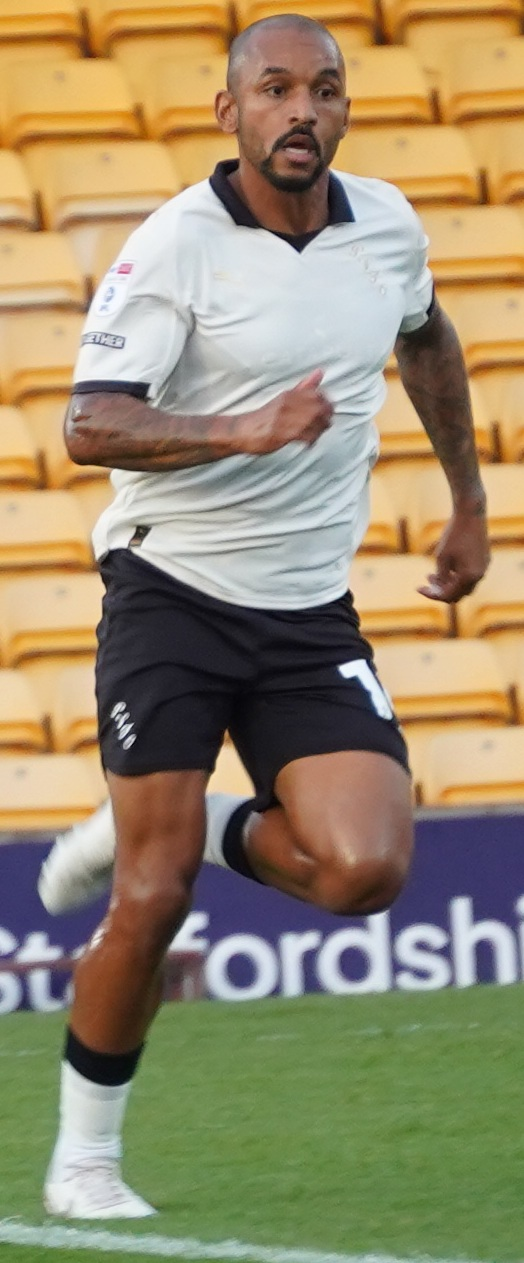
- Ojo in Port Vale colours (2025)

Personal information
- Full name: Funso-King Ayorinde Ojo
- Date of birth: 28 August 1991 (age 35)
- Place of birth: Antwerp, Belgium
- Height: 1.77 m (5 ft 9 1/2 in)
- Position: Midfielder

Youth career
- Olse Merksem
- –2004: Germinal Beerschot
- 2004–2008: PSV Eindhoven

Senior career*
Years	Team	Apps	(Gls)
2008–2012	PSV Eindhoven	11	(0)
2011	→ VVV-Venlo (loan)	8	(0)
2012–2013	Beerschot AC	24	(1)
2013–2014	Royal Antwerp	8	(0)
2014–2015	FC Dordrecht	32	(0)
2015–2017	Willem II	60	(0)
2017–2019	Scunthorpe United	80	(3)
2019–2022	Aberdeen	57	(1)
2021	→ Wigan Athletic (loan)	23	(0)
2022–2026	Port Vale	96	(4)
2024–2025	→ Shrewsbury Town (loan)	31	(0)

International career
2006	Belgium U15	4	(0)
2006–2007	Belgium U16	16	(0)
2007	Belgium U17	5	(0)
2010	Belgium U20	1	(0)
2011	Belgium U21	1	(0)
- * Club domestic league appearances and goals as of 15:04, 31 March 2026 (UTC)

Funso-King Ayorinde Ojo (born 28 August 1991) is a Belgian professional footballer who plays as a midfielder.

A Belgium under-21 international, Ojo began his career with Dutch club PSV Eindhoven, making his debut in the Eredivisie in May 2009. He played on loan at VVV-Venlo during the 2010–11 campaign but was allowed to leave PSV and returned to Belgium to play for Beerschot in June 2012. He joined his hometown club Royal Antwerp in August 2013 and signed with Dutch Eerste Divisie side FC Dordrecht in February 2014. He helped Dordrecht to win promotion out of the play-offs at the end of the 2013–14 season. Though the club were relegated the following season, Ojo remained in the Eredivisie after signing with Willem II in June 2015. He spent two seasons with the club, making 60 top-flight appearances, before he moved to England to play for Scunthorpe United in July 2017. He was sold to Scottish Premiership club Aberdeen for a fee of around £125,000 in July 2019. He spent three seasons with Aberdeen, though he spent the second half of the 2020–21 season on loan at Wigan Athletic. He returned to England permanently after joining Port Vale on a free transfer in June 2022. He was loaned out to Shrewsbury Town for the 2024–25 season.

== Club career ==
=== PSV ===
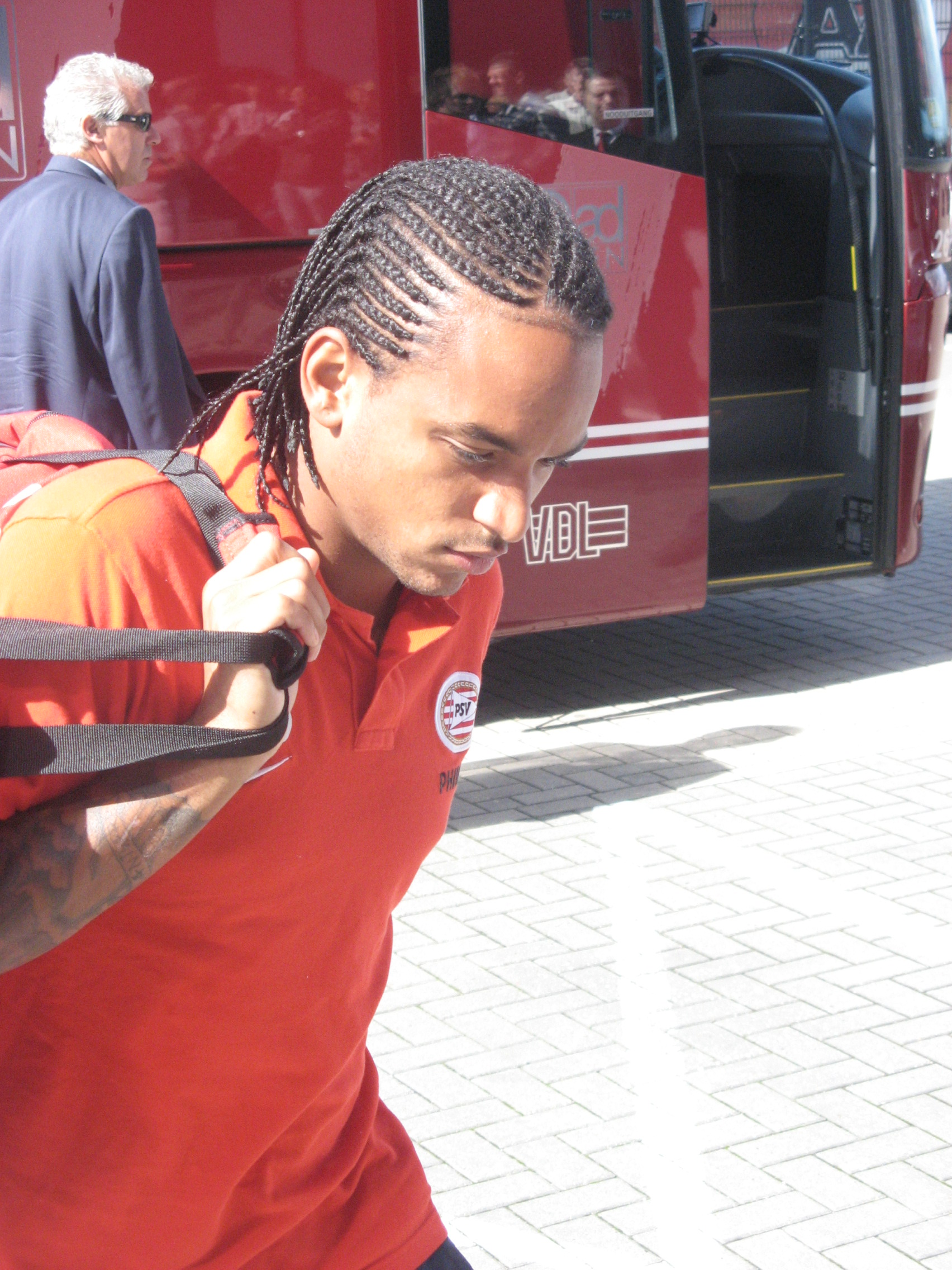
Ojo with PSV in August 2011

Funso-King Ayorinde Ojo was born in Antwerp on 28 August 1991 to parents of Nigerian origin. He joined the PSV Eindhoven Academy from Germinal Beerschot in the 2004–05 season. He made his debut for the first-team at the age of 15, when head coach Ronald Koeman played him in a friendly against amateur side HVCH on 19 May 2007. He was called up by Huub Stevens to the substitute bench for a competitive fixture in the 2008–09 season. Ojo played his first Eredivisie match for PSV on 5 May 2009 against Willem II. Ojo signed a contract extension four months later, which would keep him at the Philips Stadion until summer 2010, after he impressed manager Fred Rutten.

Having featured just twice for PSV in the first half of the 2010–11 season, Ojo joined VVV-Venlo on loan on 8 January 2011. However, he struggled to break into the starting eleven under head coach Wil Boessen, much to Ojo and Rutten's frustration. PSV signed Georginio Wijnaldum in June 2011, though Ojo would still manage to make a further ten appearances in the 2011–12 campaign.

=== Beerschot ===
On 16 April 2012, Ojo rejoined Belgian Pro League club Beerschot AC (formerly called Germinal Beerschot) on a free transfer, signing a four-year contract. Manager Adrie Koster said that he had gained technical skill in the Netherlands but would need to develop physical attributes to succeed in the Belgian leagues. On 1 September, he scored his first career goal in a 2–0 win at KV Mechelen. However, he rarely featured in the second half of the 2012–13 season due to injury and a falling out with new manager Jacky Mathijssen. He became a free agent after the club entered bankruptcy in May 2013; he came close to joining Italian club Chievo, though the deal did not end up being completed. Ojo claimed that Mathijssen "did everything to break me down and blacken me and it worked".

=== Antwerp ===
On 29 August 2013, Ojo signed a two-year contract with Belgian Second Division club Royal Antwerp after impressing manager Jimmy Floyd Hasselbaink during a trial spell. He played eight games at the start of the 2013–14 season before being dropped to the reserves, and, in December Hasselbaink confirmed that Ojo was no longer welcome at the Bosuilstadion after being unwilling to play for the youth team.

=== Dordrecht ===
Ojo returned to the Netherlands and joined Eerste Divisie side FC Dordrecht. Dordrecht qualified for the promotion play-offs at the end of the 2013–14 season and Ojo scored one of the goals in a 5–3 aggregate victory over Sparta Rotterdam to secure promotion into the top-flight. He signed a new one-year contract in June 2014. Ojo underwent ankle surgery in February 2015 to remove a piece of floating bone and was ruled out of action for the rest of the 2014–15 season. He had struggled with his ankle injury since the start of the campaign, which would prove to be a poor one for the club as Ernie Brandts's side would go on to be relegated out of the Eredivisie after finishing in last place.

=== Willem II ===
Ojo remained in the Eredivisie after signing with Willem II. He became a key first-team player for Jurgen Streppel in the 2015–16 season, playing a total of 38 games. Willem II finished in the relegation play-off places, but would beat both Almere City and NAC Breda to retain their top-flight status successfully. He featured 29 times in the 2016–17 season, though he struggled for form during the latter campaign. He turned down the offer of a new contract and instead decided to move on.

=== Scunthorpe United ===
On 18 July 2017, Ojo signed a three-year contract with English League One club Scunthorpe United. He had been scouted by Lee Turnbull. Ojo quickly became a key player for Graham Alexander's "Iron", forming an excellent midfield partnership with Neal Bishop, and his absence due to injury was blamed for three consecutive defeats in December. He played 47 games across the course of the 2017–18 campaign, scoring two goals, helping United to qualify for the play-offs. He played both legs of the 4–2 aggregate play-off semi-final defeat to Rotherham United. He came close to a move to Wigan Athletic, though Wigan and Scunthorpe failed to come to a deal. Manager Stuart McCall said that injuries and the team's poor form reduced his effectiveness in the 2018–19 season, and after relegation was confirmed Ojo looked to leave Glanford Park.

=== Aberdeen ===
Ojo was linked with a transfer to Scottish club Hibernian in June 2019. Hibernian manager Paul Heckingbottom stated that Ojo could leave Scunthorpe on a free transfer after they were relegated to League Two, but the proposed transfer collapsed after Heckingbottom claimed Scunthorpe "changed their mind, backtracked and made it really difficult". Later in the summer, Scunthorpe accepted offers of around £125,000 from Hibernian and Aberdeen. Ojo moved to Aberdeen, signing a three-year contract with the club. Manager Derek McInnes said that the move was decided for footballing reasons rather than money as the financial aspect of the contracts were identical. Ojo said that "we talked about football and other things and he [McInnes] touched something in me", adding that the city, state-of-the-art training ground and prospect of European football had convinced him to go with Aberdeen. He played 16 Scottish Premiership games in the 2019–20 season and also featured four times in the early rounds of the UEFA Europa League. He made seven starts and six substitute appearances in the first half of the 2020–21 campaign. On 28 January 2021, Ojo joined English League One side Wigan Athletic on loan until the end of the 2020–21 season. He made 23 appearances for Leam Richardson's "Latics", helping the club to finish one point above the relegation zone.

In summer 2021, Aberdeen accepted bids from Salford City and Wrexham. However, Ojo considered seeing out his contract with Aberdeen and then retiring from the game and returning to Belgium. On 20 November, Ojo was sent off for only the second time in his career after receiving a yellow card for reacting to a Dundee United supporter who pushed him as he went to retrieve the ball from the crowd at Tannadice. The supporter was arrested and later sentenced to community service after admitting assault. Ojo impressed manager Stephen Glass in the first half of the 2021–22 campaign, playing at full-back, attacking midfield, defensive midfield and out wide. However, he was not retained by new manager Jim Goodwin and left Pittodrie at the end of his contract in June 2022.

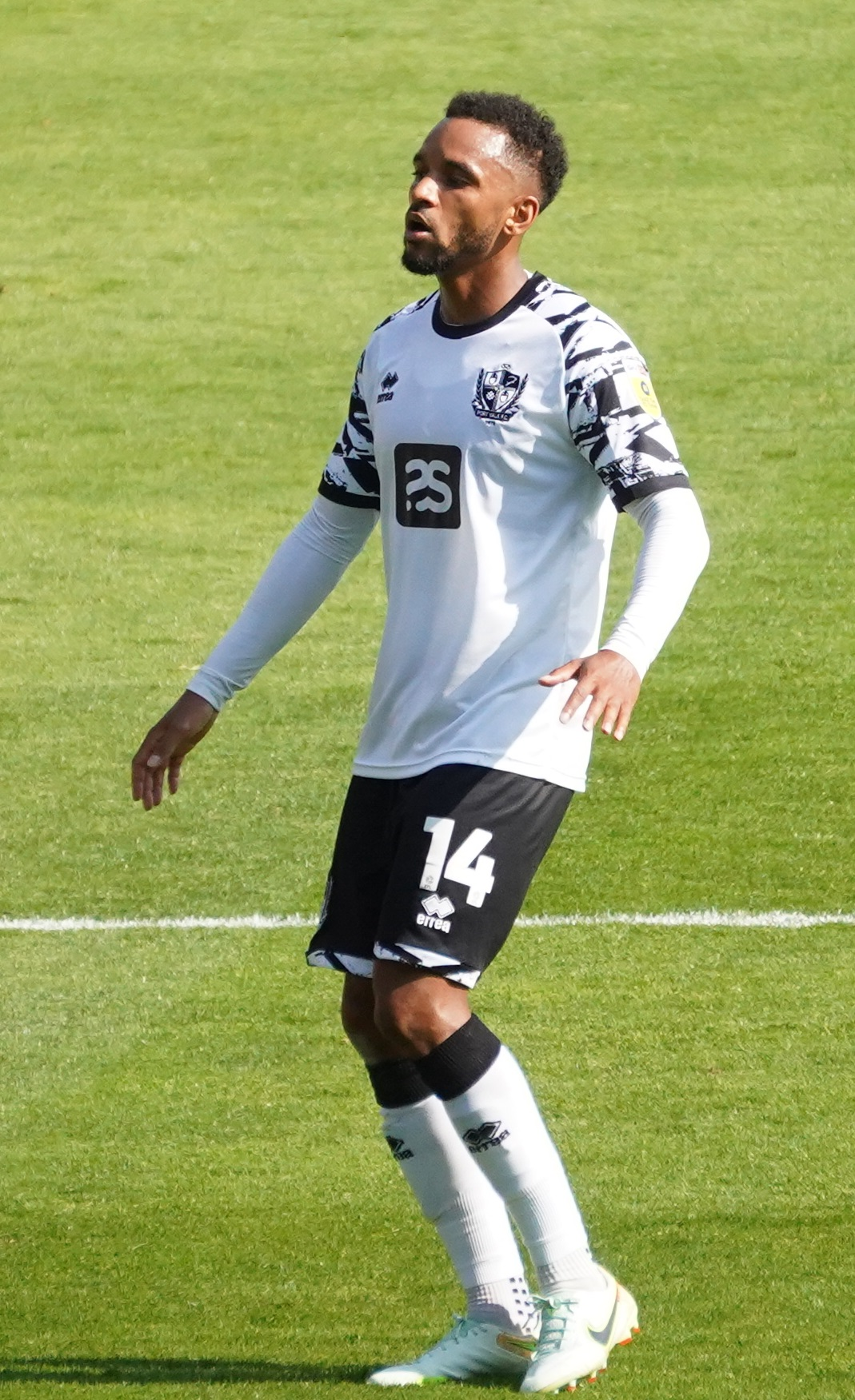
Ojo playing for Port Vale (August 2022)

=== Port Vale ===
On 28 June 2022, Ojo joined English League One club Port Vale, with director of football David Flitcroft stating that: "we think that Funso is the type of player that can conduct and orchestrate them [his teammates] on the pitch". Ojo started nine of the club's first ten league games of the 2022–23 campaign, before being sidelined with what manager Darrell Clarke described as "quite a bad hamstring" injury at the end of September. Ojo returned to the substitutes bench on 26 December and scored his first goal at Vale Park on 24 January 2023, in a 2–1 defeat to Derby County. Four days later, he was voted as the club's player of the match in a 0–0 draw at Cheltenham Town. On 25 March, he scored a "wonderful" goal from 25 yards (23 m) to help secure a 2–2 draw with Portsmouth at Fratton Park. He was sent off for violent conduct on Good Friday in stoppage-time of a 3–0 defeat at Accrington Stanley. He was named as the club's PFA Community Player of the Year for the 2022–23 season for his efforts at becoming more environmentally friendly.

Andy Crosby appointed Ojo as the club's new vice-captain in July 2023, behind club captain Nathan Smith. Ojo signed a new contract the following month which would keep him at the club until June 2026. The club rejected a transfer offer for the player from an unnamed club. On 11 November, he played as a sweeper in a 1–1 draw at Lincoln City, showing composure as he adapted well to the change of role. He was injured the following month, however, as a hamstring injury saw him sidelined for several weeks. He returned to action and scored a penalty to rescue a 2–2 at home to Stevenage on 10 February, which he dedicated to outgoing manager Crosby. The club employed a more pragmatic approach under new manager Darren Moore, which did not suit Ojo's strengths at controlling possession with short passes. Ojo also lost the vice-captaincy at the end of the 2023–24 season.

On 30 August 2024, Ojo returned to League One on a season-long loan at Shrewsbury Town. He had briefly worked with Shrews manager Paul Hurst at Scunthorpe. He was dropped by new manager Gareth Ainsworth in January, who said he responded to the disappointment in "exemplary" fashion. Ojo said that he preferred the style of football played by the third manager of his loan spell, Michael Appleton, most of all.

Back with Vale, who had been promoted in his absence, he had a strong start to the 2025–26 season, with Moore remarking that he had "showcased his talent and ability and his all-round understanding". Supporters voted him as the Valiant Substack's player of the month for August. Moore dropped him from the squad, however, despite the team struggling for form and Ojo playing well when selected. He returned to the first XI under new manager Jon Brady, and was named player of the match in the win over Premier League side Sunderland in the fifth round of the FA Cup. He missed the end-of-season run-in after picking up a knock, with the club relegated in his absence. He was released upon the expiry of his contract.

== International career ==
Ojo was capped by Belgium from under-15 to under-21 level, winning his first and only under-21 cap as a late substitute in a Iceland on 1 September 2011.

== Style of play ==
Ojo is a versatile midfielder who links defence and attack by winning the ball and passing it on to more creative teammates. He has good intelligence, fitness and technical ability. Scunthorpe United manager Stuart McCall said that he was best utilised as a defensive midfielder, though can also play as a box-to-box midfielder.

== Personal life ==
Ojo is a trained physical instructor and is also involved in real estate. He is married.

He entered a not-guilty plea to a charge of assault for an incident that took place following a Scottish Premiership match at Tannadice Park in November 2021. Ojo admitted he had "squared-up" to an opposition fan, and was fined £400 after being found guilty of pushing the man and knocking his glasses off, though the punch Ojo had thrown was ruled to have been in self-defence.

Speaking in February 2023 as part of the English Football League's Green Football Weekend, Ojo was reported to have saved more than 500 kg of CO_{2} emissions from about 260 green activities, following his choice to change his lifestyle and switch to a plant-based diet. His wife, Julie Herman, launched the fashion business Rose Ojo in August 2024, which upcycled football shirts into puffer jackets.

== Career statistics ==
As of match played 4 April 2026

Appearances and goals by club, season and competition
Club	Season	League			National cup (Note: Includes KNVB Cup, Belgian Cup, Scottish Cup, FA Cup)		League cup (Note: Includes Scottish League Cup, EFL Cup)		Other		Total	
Club	Season	Division	Apps	Goals	Apps	Goals	Apps	Goals	Apps	Goals	Apps	Goals
PSV Eindhoven	2008–09	Eredivisie	1	0	0	0	—		0	0	1	0
PSV Eindhoven	2009–10	Eredivisie	3	0	0	0	—		1 (Note: Appearances in the UEFA Europa League)	0	4	0
PSV Eindhoven	2010–11	Eredivisie	2	0	0	0	—		1	0	3	0
PSV Eindhoven	2011–12	Eredivisie	5	0	2	0	—		3	0	10	0
PSV Eindhoven	Total		11	0	2	0	0	0	5	0	18	0
VVV-Venlo (loan)	2010–11	Eredivisie	8	0	0	0	—		3 (Note: Appearances in the Eredivisie/Eerste Divisie promotion/relegation play-offs)	0	11	0
Beerschot	2012–13	Pro League	24	1	1	0	—		0	0	25	1
Antwerp	2013–14	Belgian Second Division	8	0	0	0	—		0	0	8	0
Dordrecht	2013–14	Eerste Divisie	13	0	0	0	—		4	1	17	1
Dordrecht	2014–15	Eredivisie	19	0	1	0	—		0	0	20	0
Dordrecht	Total		32	0	1	0	0	0	4	1	37	1
Willem II	2015–16	Eredivisie	32	0	2	0	—		4	0	38	0
Willem II	2016–17	Eredivisie	28	0	1	0	—		0	0	29	0
Willem II	Total		60	0	3	0	0	0	4	0	67	0
Scunthorpe United	2017–18	League One	41	2	2	0	1	0	3 (Note: 2 appearances in the 2018 EFL play-offs and 1 appearance in 2017–18 EFL Trophy)	0	47	2
Scunthorpe United	2018–19	League One	39	1	0	0	0	0	1 (Note: Appearance in the EFL Trophy)	0	40	1
Scunthorpe United	Total		80	3	2	0	1	0	4	0	87	3
Aberdeen	2019–20	Scottish Premiership	16	0	3	0	1	0	4	0	24	0
Aberdeen	2020–21	Scottish Premiership	11	0	0	0	1	0	1	0	13	0
Aberdeen	2021–22	Scottish Premiership	30	1	2	0	1	0	6 (Note: Appearances in the UEFA Europa Conference League)	0	39	1
Aberdeen	Total		57	1	5	0	3	0	11	0	76	1
Wigan Athletic (loan)	2020–21	League One	23	0	—		—		—		23	0
Port Vale	2022–23	League One	28	2	0	0	1	0	0	0	29	2
Port Vale	2023–24	League One	40	2	4	1	4	1	1	0	49	4
Port Vale	2024–25	League Two	1	0	0	0	1	0	0	0	2	0
Port Vale	2025–26	League One	27	0	4	0	1	0	4	0	36	0
Port Vale	Total		96	4	8	1	7	1	5	0	116	6
Shrewsbury Town (loan)	2024–25	League One	31	0	1	0	—		1	0	33	0
Career total			430	9	23	1	11	1	37	1	501	12

== Honours ==
Dordrecht

- Eerste Divisie play-offs: 2013–14
