= Tim Matavž =

Slovenian footballer (born 1989)

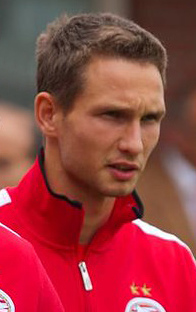
- Matavž with PSV in 2011

Personal information
- Full name: Tim Matavž
- Date of birth: 13 January 1989 (age 37)
- Place of birth: Šempeter pri Gorici, SFR Yugoslavia
- Height: 1.88 m (6 ft 2 in)
- Position: Striker

Team information
- Current team: Izola
- Number: 9

Youth career
- 1995–2004: Bilje
- 2004–2006: ND Gorica

Senior career*
Years	Team	Apps	(Gls)
2006–2007	ND Gorica	30	(11)
2007–2011	Groningen	84	(34)
2008–2009	→ FC Emmen (loan)	15	(5)
2011–2014	PSV	70	(24)
2014	Jong PSV	2	(0)
2014–2017	FC Augsburg	27	(3)
2016	→ Genoa (loan)	7	(0)
2016–2017	→ 1. FC Nürnberg (loan)	20	(5)
2017–2020	Vitesse	69	(32)
2020–2021	Al Wahda	19	(12)
2021–2022	Bursaspor	16	(2)
2022–2023	Omonia	10	(3)
2023–2024	HNK Gorica	39	(5)
2024–2026	ND Gorica	41	(6)
2026–	Izola	2	(2)

International career
2006	Slovenia U18	3	(1)
2006	Slovenia U19	4	(0)
2007	Slovenia U20	1	(0)
2006–2010	Slovenia U21	20	(6)
2010–2020	Slovenia	39	(11)
- * Club domestic league appearances and goals as of 21 August 2026

Tim Matavž (born 13 January 1989) is a Slovenian professional footballer who plays as a striker for Izola.

== Club career ==
Matavž began his football career at the age of 6 playing for Bilje. In 2004, he moved to the Gorica youth squads. He was promoted to their senior squad in the 2006–07 season and played a total of 30 matches in the Slovenian first division, scoring 11 goals in the process.

On 30 August 2007, at the age of 18, he signed a five-year contract for Groningen. On 26 September 2007 he scored four goals in KNVB Cup in a match against IJsselmeervogels, but he later moved to Emmen on loan and remained there until January 2009.

On 13 March 2009, Matavž scored his first goal in the Eredivisie in a 2–0 victory over Roda. Soon he began scoring for Groningen on a regular basis in all competitions. On 24 February 2010 Matavž extended his contract with the club until 2013. On 6 February 2011, in a match against Willem II, Matavž scored his first hat-trick in the Eredivisie.

On 2 February 2011, Groningen sporting director Hans Nijland said that Matavž had already agreed terms with Napoli and that he was looking forward to joining them. However, Eredivisie side PSV Eindhoven were also in talks with Groningen to buy him before the transfer window closed. On 31 August 2011, Matavž eventually signed a five-year contract with PSV.

On 29 June 2017, Matavž returned to the Netherlands, to join Vitesse on a three-year deal.

On 19 July 2020, Matavž joined Al Wahda on a two-year deal.

== International career ==
On 9 October 2010, Matavž scored a hat-trick for Slovenia in the UEFA Euro 2012 qualifying match against Faroe Islands. At the age of 21, he became the youngest player ever to score three goals for Slovenia. Overall, Matavž earned a total of 39 caps for the national team, scoring 11 goals.

== Personal life ==
Matavž was born in Šempeter pri Gorici, Slovenia (then part of Yugoslavia). He is the cousin of fellow footballer Etien Velikonja. In June 2014, Matavž married his long-term partner Polona Faganelj. He has two daughters, Tia (born 2012) and Ela (born 2015), and one son, Val (born 2017). Beside Slovene, Matavž is also fluent in Dutch.

In April 2024, several Slovenian media outlets reported that Matavž had been charged with domestic violence, and that the court allegedly imposed a restraining order, preventing him from contacting his wife and children.

== Career statistics ==
=== Club ===
As of 16 June 2024

Club	Season	League			National cup		Continental		Other		Total	
Club	Season	Division	Apps	Goals	Apps	Goals	Apps	Goals	Apps	Goals	Apps	Goals
ND Gorica	2006–07	Slovenian PrvaLiga	27	11	3	2	1 (Note: Appearance in UEFA Champions League)	0	—		31	13
ND Gorica	2007–08	Slovenian PrvaLiga	3	0	0	0	2 (Note: Appearances in UEFA Cup)	1	—		5	1
ND Gorica	Total		30	11	3	2	3	1	0	0	36	14
Groningen	2007–08	Eredivisie	15	0	2	4	0	0	—		17	4
Groningen	2008–09	Eredivisie	4	2	0	0	—		4 (Note: Appearances in Eredivisie European play-offs)	1	8	3
Groningen	2009–10	Eredivisie	32	13	3	2	—		2	1	37	16
Groningen	2010–11	Eredivisie	29	16	4	2	—		2	2	35	20
Groningen	2011–12	Eredivisie	4	3	0	0	—				4	3
Groningen	Total		84	34	9	8	0	0	8	4	101	46
FC Emmen (loan)	2008–09	Eerste Divisie	15	5	1	0	—				16	5
PSV	2011–12	Eredivisie	28	11	5	4	9 (Note: Appearances in UEFA Europa League)	5	—		42	20
PSV	2012–13	Eredivisie	27	11	4	2	7	7	0	0	38	20
PSV	2013–14	Eredivisie	15	2	1	0	6 (Note: Four appearances and two goals in UEFA Champions League and two appearances in UEFA Europa League)	2	—		22	4
PSV	Total		70	24	10	6	22	14	0	0	102	44
FC Augsburg	2014–15	Bundesliga	16	3	1	0	—				17	3
FC Augsburg	2015–16	Bundesliga	11	0	2	0	4	0	—		17	0
FC Augsburg	Total		27	3	3	0	4	0	0	0	34	3
Genoa (loan)	2015–16	Serie A	7	0	0	0	—				7	0
1. FC Nürnberg (loan)	2016–17	2. Bundesliga	20	5	1	0	—				21	5
Vitesse	2017–18	Eredivisie	30	14	1	0	5	1	5 (Note: One appearance in Johan Cruyff Shield and four appearances and two goals in Eredivisie European play-offs)	2	41	17
Vitesse	2018–19	Eredivisie	14	6	0	0	4	2	4	3	22	11
Vitesse	2019–20	Eredivisie	25	12	2	1	—				27	13
Vitesse	Total		69	32	3	1	9	3	9	5	90	41
Al Wahda	2020–21	UAE Pro League	19	12	0	0	7 (Note: Appearances in AFC Champions League)	1	1 (Note: Appearance in UAE League Cup)	0	27	13
Bursaspor	2021–22	TFF First League	16	2	1	0	—		—		17	2
Omonia	2021–22	Cypriot First Division	6	2	5	0	—		—		11	2
Omonia	2022–23	Cypriot First Division	4	1	0	0	1	0	1 (Note: Appearance in Cypriot Super Cup)	0	6	1
Omonia	Total		10	3	5	0	1	0	1	0	17	3
HNK Gorica	2022–23	Croatian Football League	15	0	0	0	—		—		15	0
HNK Gorica	2023–24	Croatian Football League	24	5	2	0	—		—		26	5
HNK Gorica	Total		39	5	2	0	0	0	0	0	41	5
Career total			406	136	38	17	46	19	19	9	509	181

=== International ===
Scores and results list Slovenia's goal tally first, score column indicates score after each Matavž goal.

List of international goals scored by Tim Matavž
No.	Date	Venue	Opponent	Score	Result	Competition
1	8 October 2010	Stožice Stadium, Ljubljana, Slovenia	Faroe Islands	1–0	5–1	UEFA Euro 2012 qualification
2	8 October 2010	Stožice Stadium, Ljubljana, Slovenia	Faroe Islands	2–0	5–1	UEFA Euro 2012 qualification
3	8 October 2010	Stožice Stadium, Ljubljana, Slovenia	Faroe Islands	3–0	5–1	UEFA Euro 2012 qualification
4	3 June 2011	Svangaskarð, Tórshavn, Faroe Islands	Faroe Islands	1–0	2–0	UEFA Euro 2012 qualification
5	2 September 2011	Stožice Stadium, Ljubljana, Slovenia	Estonia	1–1	1–2	UEFA Euro 2012 qualification
6	15 November 2011	Stožice Stadium, Ljubljana, Slovenia	United States	1–1	2–3	Friendly
7	15 November 2011	Stožice Stadium, Ljubljana, Slovenia	United States	2–3	2–3	Friendly
8	12 October 2012	Ljudski vrt, Maribor, Slovenia	Cyprus	1–0	2–1	2014 FIFA World Cup qualification
9	12 October 2012	Ljudski vrt, Maribor, Slovenia	Cyprus	2–0	2–1	2014 FIFA World Cup qualification
10	31 May 2013	Schüco Arena, Bielefeld, Germany	Turkey	2–0	2–0	Friendly
11	19 November 2019	Stadion Narodowy, Warsaw, Poland	Poland	1–1	2–3	UEFA Euro 2020 qualification

== Honours ==
PSV

- KNVB Cup: 2011–12
- Johan Cruijff Shield: 2012

Omonia

- Cypriot Cup: 2021–22
