= Stefano Marzo =

Belgian footballer (born 1991)

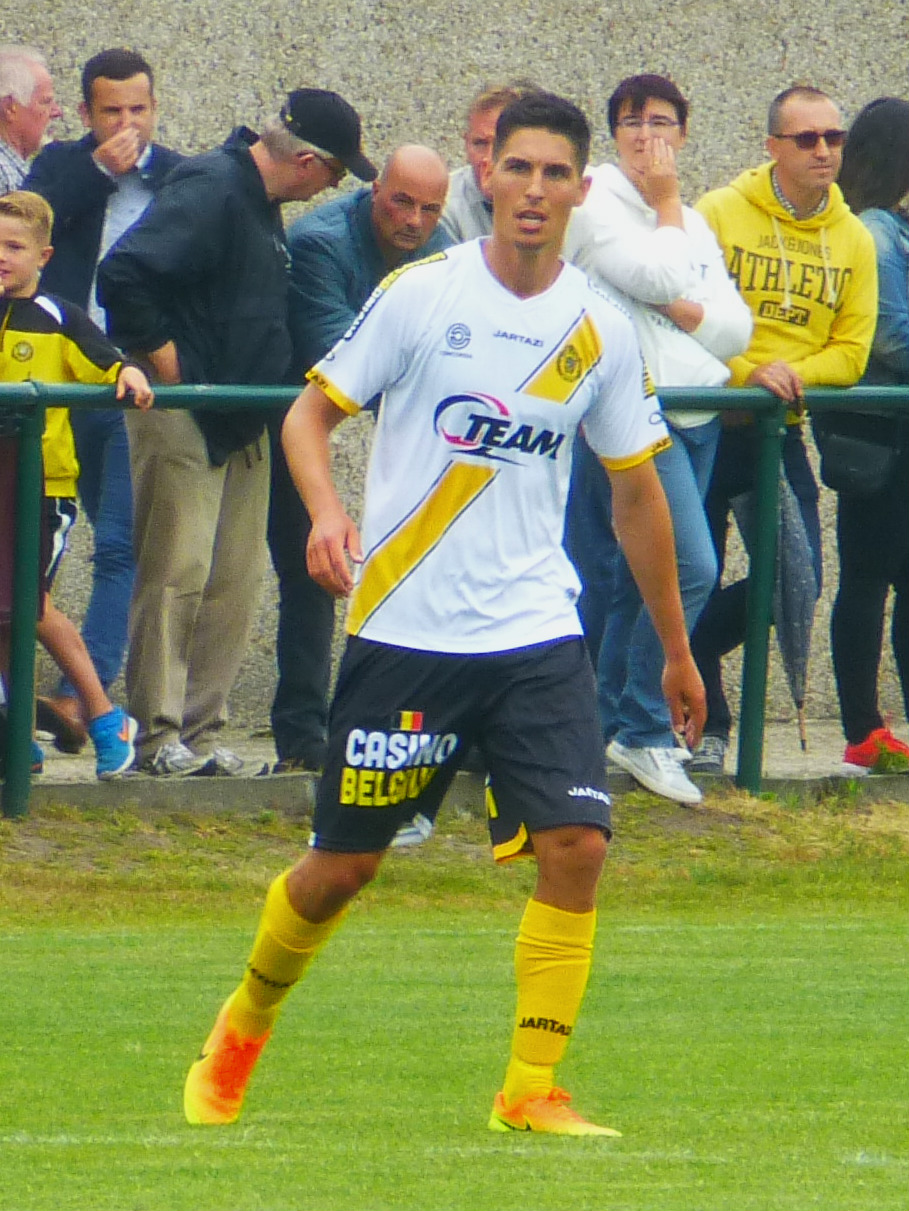

Personal information
- Date of birth: 22 March 1991 (age 35)
- Place of birth: Lommel, Belgium
- Height: 1.80 m (5 ft 11 in)
- Position: Right-back

Team information
- Current team: Grenstrappers Kolonie

Youth career
- 1997–2003: Lommel
- 2003–2011: PSV

Senior career*
Years	Team	Apps	(Gls)
2011–2012	PSV	0	(0)
2012–2013	Beerschot	19	(0)
2013–2017	Heerenveen	115	(1)
2017–2020	Sporting Lokeren	27	(1)
2020–2022	Roda JC	73	(7)
2022–2024	Dender	54	(7)
2024–2026	RFC Liège	15	(0)
2026–	Grenstrappers Kolonie		
- * Club domestic league appearances and goals as of 29 August 2026

Stefano Marzo (born 22 March 1991) is a Belgian professional footballer who plays as a right-back for an amateur side Grenstrappers Kolonie.
