= Ismo Vorstermans =

Dutch footballer

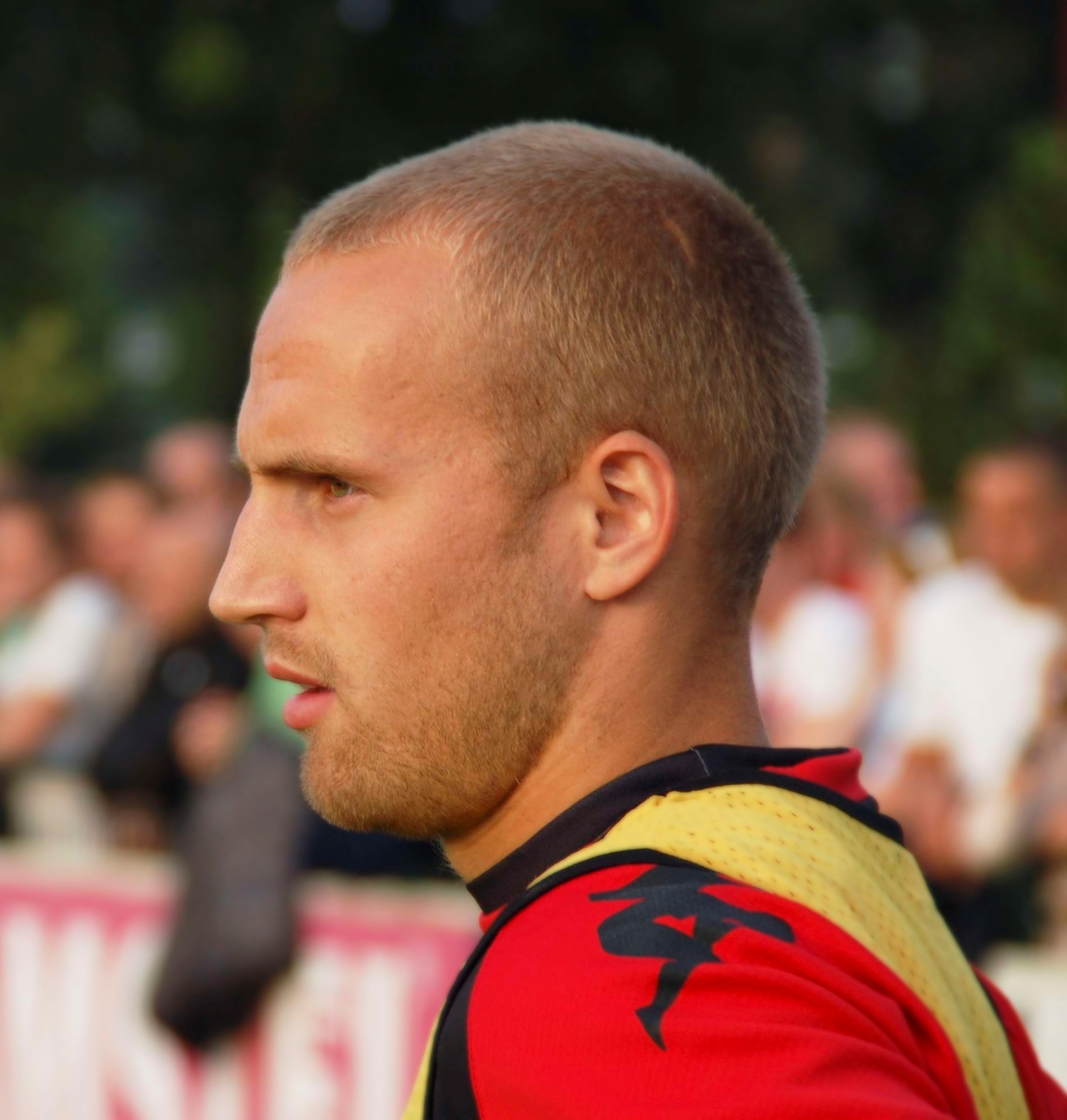

Personal information
- Date of birth: 30 March 1989 (age 37)
- Place of birth: Almere, Netherlands
- Height: 1.82 m (6 ft 0 in)
- Position: Centre back

Youth career
- De Zwarte Schapen
- Omniworld
- –2008: Ajax
- 2008–2009: Utrecht

Senior career*
Years	Team	Apps	(Gls)
2009–2013	Utrecht	17	(3)
2012–2013	→ VVV-Venlo (loan)	26	(2)
2013	Dordrecht	1	(1)
2014–2017	SV Spakenburg	51	(4)
- * Club domestic league appearances and goals

Ismo Vorstermans (born 30 March 1989) is a Dutch former professional footballer who played as a defender.

== Career ==
Vorstermans started his career in the renowned youth academy of Ajax before moving to Utrecht. He made his professional debut for the club on 23 September 2009 in a KNVB Cup match against Groningen (2–4 loss). He played the full 90 minutes, but was replaced by Nana Akwasi Asare in extra time. For the 2010–11 season he was promoted to the first squad of Utrecht, where he made his debut in European football in the qualification match versus KF Tirana. In a game that ended 1–1, Utrecht defended a 4–0 win from the first leg and an early 0–1 lead by a goal from Ricky van Wolfswinkel. Vorstermans scored his first goal for the club in a 3–0 win over Ajax on 23 January 2011, the third goal for Utrecht after a pass from Michael Silberbauer.

During the 2011–12 campaign, Vorstermans joined VVV-Venlo on loan until the end of the season. His loan was extended with one season from the summer of 2012. After his contract with Utrecht had been terminated in July 2013, Vorstermans joined Dordrecht as a free agent in August 2013. After just a week at the club the technical director of Dordrecht, Marco Boogers, announced on Twitter that the 24-year-old Vorstermans retired as professional footballer to focus on his education. Vorstermans played one game for Dordrecht against Excelsior in which he made one goal but also suffered an injury. This was his last game as professional footballer.

A year later, Vorstermans began playing for with Topklasse club SV Spakenburg. He left the club in 2017 due to persistent injuries.
