= Alex Emenike =

Nigerian footballer

Personal information
- Full name: Alexander Emenike Nkume
- Date of birth: 22 January 1989 (age 37)
- Place of birth: Enugu, Nigeria
- Height: 1.85 m (6 ft 1 in)
- Position: Defender

Senior career*
Years	Team	Apps	(Gls)
2007–2009	Enugu Rangers		
2009–2012	VVV-Venlo	35	(1)

International career^{‡}
2009	Nigeria U-20		
- * Club domestic league appearances and goals ‡ National team caps and goals as of 29 May 2011

Alexander Emenike // (born 22 January 1989), formerly known as Alex Nkume, is a Nigerian association football player, who last played as a central defender for VVV-Venlo.

== Career ==
Emenike began his career in the youth side with Enugu Rangers who was promoted in January 2007 to the Nigerian Premier League team and joined on 31 July 2009 on trial to VVV-Venlo.

== International career ==
He is also current member of the Nigeria national under-20 football team and represented the team at 2009 African Youth Championship, formerly played with the team the WAFU Cup 2008. He was in the Trainings camp squad for the 2009 FIFA U-20 World Cup squads he was not call up for the tournament.
