= 2014–15 FC Utrecht season =

FC Utrecht
2014–15 season
- Eredivisie: 11th
- KNVB Cup: Second round
- Top goalscorer: Sébastien Haller (11)
Home colours	Away colours

The 2014–15 FC Utrecht season was the club's 45th season of existence and its 45th season in the Eredivisie.

== Competitions ==
=== Pre-season friendlies ===
12 July 2014	FC Utrecht	5–0	JSV	Utrecht
9:30	de Kogel 18' (pen.) 35'; Falcon 76' (o.g.); Diemers 77'; Mårtensson 90'	Report		Stadium: Stadion Galgenwaard; Attendance: 2,000

15 July 2014	VV Serooskerke	0–9	Utrecht	Serooskerke
13:00		Report	van Velzen 26', 38', 56'; Sarota 28'; Barazite 36' de Kogel 71'; Markiet 84'; Diemers 87', 89'	Stadium: Sportpark Noordhout

20 July 2014	Utrecht (Netherlands)	2–1	(Scotland) Dundee United	Utrecht
11:00	Toornstra 48' de Kogel 52'	Report	Graham 85'	Stadium: Stadion Galgenwaard

2 August 2014	Sparta Nijkerk	1–7	Utrecht	Nijkerk
9:00	Jong 77'	Report	Toornstra 14'; Barazite 36', 51', 89'; Markiet 54', 89'; Ayoub 87'	Stadium: De Ebbenhorst

3 August 2014	Utrecht (Netherlands)	1–1	(Turkey) Konyaspor	Utrecht
9:30		Report		Stadium: Stadion Galgenwaard

=== Eredivisie ===
==== Table ====
Pos	Team	Pld	W	D	L	GF	GA	GD	Pts
9	Willem II	34	13	7	14	46	50	−4	46
10	Twente (Note: FC Twente were deducted three points twice since they did not meet the financial standards set by the KNVB.)	34	13	10	11	56	51	+5	43
11	Utrecht	34	11	8	15	60	62	−2	41
12	Cambuur	34	11	8	15	46	56	−10	41
13	ADO Den Haag	34	9	10	15	44	53	−9	37

Source: NUsport
Rules for classification: 1) points; 2) goal difference; 3) number of goals scored

==== Results ====
8 August 2014 1	PEC Zwolle	2–0	Utrecht	Zwolle
16:45 WET	Drost 75'; Ioannidis (yellow card) 90'; Moro 90+3'	Summary	Janssen (yellow card) 34'; Kali (yellow card) 37'	Stadium: IJsseldelta Stadion; Attendance: 12,050

17 August 2014 2	Utrecht	2–1	Willem II	Utrecht
14:30 WET	Ayoub (yellow card) 22'; Toornstra 64' de Kogel 88'	Summary	Cornelisse (yellow card) 45'; Haemhouts 76'	Stadium: Stadion Galgenwaard; Attendance: 16,123; Referee: Bjorn Kuipers

24 August 2014 3	Feyenoord	1–2	Utrecht	Rotterdam
14:30 WET	te Vrede 33'; Clasie (yellow card) 36'; Schaken (yellow card) 44'	Report	Barazite 45+1'; Antwi 72'; Janssen (yellow card) 78'; Ruiter (yellow card) 90+1'	Stadium: De Kuip; Attendance: 42,500; Referee: Kevin Blom

30 August 2014 4	Heerenveen	3–1	Utrecht	Heerenveen
20:45 WET	Uth 3', 54', 90+4'; Marzo (yellow card) 45'	Report	Ayoub (yellow card) 20'; Leeuwin (yellow card) 60'; Janssen 90+1'	Stadium: Abe Lenstra Stadion; Attendance: 22,900; Referee: Dennis Higler

14 September 2014 5	Utrecht	0–0	ADO Den Haag	Utrecht
12:30 WET	Leeuwin (yellow card) 8'; Cortie (yellow card) 55'	Report	Alberg (yellow card) 17'	Stadium: Stadion Galgenwaard; Attendance: 17,400; Referee: Serdar Gözübüyük

21 September 2014 6	Utrecht	1–0	Groningen	Utrecht
16:45 CET	Oar (yellow card) 59'; Boymans 61' van der Maarel (yellow card) 81'	Report	Antonia (yellow card) 31'	Stadium: Stadion Galgenwaard; Attendance: 14,503; Referee: Ed Janssen

28 September 2014 7	Twente	3–1	Utrecht	Enschede
14:30 CET	Ebecilio 5'; Corona (yellow card) 13'; Bjelland (yellow card) 45'; Kum 64' (o.g.); Castaignos 90'	Report	Kum (yellow card) 4'; Ayoub (yellow card) 68' (yellow-red card) 89' (goal) 71'; Kali (yellow card) 70'	Stadium: De Grolsch Veste; Attendance: 27,500; Referee: Danny Makkelie

4 October 2014 8	Utrecht	2–3	Go Ahead Eagles	Utrecht
20:45 CET	Kerk 49'; Boymans 51'	Report	Türüç 54'; Vriends 74'; Rijsdijk 90+3'	Stadium: Stadion Galgenwaard; Attendance: 15,397; Referee: Martin van den Kerkhof

19 October 2014 9	Dordrecht	1–3	Utrecht	Dordrecht
14:30 CET	Lima (yellow card) 52'; Pisas (yellow card) 53'; Gosens (yellow card) 54' ten Voorde 73'	Report	Boymans 9'; Letschert (yellow card) 55'; Kerk (yellow card) 66'; Lima 68' (o.g.); Ayoub 86'	Stadium: GN Bouw Stadion; Attendance: 3,664; Referee: Jereon Manschot

26 October 2014 10	Utrecht	1–5	PSV	Utrecht
15:30 CET	Kali (yellow card) 2'; Van Der Maarel (yellow card) 18' (yellow-red card) 22'; Boymans 50'	Report	Maher 12'; Willems (yellow card) 16'; Memphis 23' (pen.); Hendrix 25'; Bruma (yellow card) 75'; Kum 81' (o.g.); Wijnaldum 90+1'	Stadium: Stadion Galgenwaard; Attendance: 18,140; Referee: Bas Nijhuis

2 November 2014 11	Utrecht	3–1	Vitesse Arnhem	Utrecht
12:30 CET	Kum 12' (yellow card) 59'; Boymans 69' 76' (pen.); Janssen (yellow card) 71'	Report	Pröpper 11'; Kruiswijk (yellow card) 64' (yellow-red card) 75'; Leerdam (yellow card) 77'; Diks (yellow card) 83'	Stadium: Stadion Galgenwaard; Attendance: 16,800; Referee: Kevin Blom

7 November 2014 12	Excelsior	2–2	Utrecht	Rotterdam
21:00 CET	van Weert 23' van Diermen (yellow card) 60'; Kuipers (yellow card) 84' de Reuver 90'	Report	van der Maarel 33'; Kum 84'	Stadium: Stadion Woudestein; Attendance: 3,600; Referee: Richard Liesveld

23 November 2014 13	Utrecht	1–3	Cambuur	Utrecht
17:45 CET	Boymans 24' (pen.); Kum (yellow card) 88'	Report	Andriuškevičius (yellow card) 23'; El Makrini (yellow card) 53'; Barto 38'; Ogbeche (yellow card) 58' (goal) 82'; Reijnen (yellow card) 84'; Meleg 89'	Stadium: Stadion Galgenwaard; Attendance: 15,355; Referee: Richard Liesveld

29 November 2014 14	NAC Breda	1–5	Utrecht	Breda
20:45 CET	Perica (yellow card) 29'; Sarpong 37'; Boateng (yellow card) 79'	Report	Boymans 11', 54'; Janssen (yellow card) 40'; Duplan 45+1'; Ayoub (yellow card) 77'; Heerings (yellow card) 81'; Rubin 83'; Barazite 89'	Stadium: Rat Verlegh Stadion; Attendance: 17,300; Referee: Jochem Kamphuis

August 2014 15	Utrecht	2–4	Heracles	Utrecht
15:30 CET	Leeuwin (yellow card) 13'; Peterson 23'; Boymans (yellow card) 28'; Markiet 90+1'	Report	Bruns 8'; Weghorst (yellow card) 25' (goal) 74'; Tannane (yellow card) 33'; Fledderus 49'; Bel Hassani (yellow card) 72' (goal) 90+2'	Stadium: Stadion Galgenwaard; Attendance: 15,006; Referee: Tom van Sichem

14 December 2014 16	Ajax	3–1	Utrecht	Amsterdam
12:30 CET	Serero 16'; Klaassen 20'; El Ghazi 65'	Report	Rubin 35'; Oar (yellow card) 40'; Janssen (yellow card) 90'	Stadium: Amsterdam Arena; Attendance: 48,007; Referee: Pol van Boekel

20 December 2014 17	AZ	0–3	Utrecht	Alkmaar
19:45 CET	Haye (yellow card) 34'; Ortiz (yellow card) 53'	Report	Duplan 12', 28' (yellow card) 76'; Diemers 37'; Ayoub (yellow card) 66'; Hardeveld (yellow card) 88'	Stadium: AFAS Stadion; Attendance: 14,825; Referee: Richard Liesveld

18 January 2015 18	Utrecht	1–2	Heerenveen	Utrecht
15:30 CET	Kum (yellow card) 67'; Janssen 90' (pen.)	Summary	Slagveer 41'; Larsson 65' van Aken (yellow card) 89' de Roon (yellow card) 90'	Stadium: Stadion Galgenwaard; Attendance: 15,560; Referee: (Netherlands) Kevin Blom

25 January 2015 19	Groningen	2–2	Utrecht	Groningen
15:30 CET	Chery 32' de Leeuw 51'; Mahi (yellow card) 75'	Summary	Duplan 33'; Ayoub 56'; Leeuwin (yellow card) 62'; Kali (yellow card) 85'	Stadium: Euroborg; Attendance: 19,561; Referee: (Netherlands) Edwin van de Graaf

1 February 2015 20	Utrecht	0–2	PEC Zwolle	Utrecht
14:30 CET	Barazite (yellow card) 90'	Summary	Lam 38'; Lukoki (yellow card) 68'; Nijland 79'	Stadium: Stadion Galgenwaard; Attendance: 19,078; Referee: (Netherlands) Siemen Mulder

4 February 2015 21	Willem II	1–0	Utrecht	Tilburg
20:45 CET	Haemhouts 80'	Summary		Stadium: Koning Willem II Stadion; Attendance: 9,371; Referee: (Netherlands) Dennis Higler

7 February 2015 22	PSV	3–1	Utrecht	Eindhoven
20:45 CET	Narsingh 47'; Depay 51' 90'; Willems (yellow card) 89'	Summary	Janssen (yellow card) 49'; Leeuwin (yellow card) 64'; Ayoub 70'; Hardeveld (yellow card) 90'	Stadium: Philips Stadion; Attendance: 31,000; Referee: (Netherlands) Danny Makkelie

15 February 2015 23	Utrecht	6–1	Dordrecht	Utrecht
14:30 CET	Haller 16' 39' 49' (pen.) 81'; Janssen (yellow card) 45' (yellow-red card); Kum 85'; Hardeveld 87'	Summary	Lewis (yellow card) 60'; Lima (yellow card) 60' (yellow-red card) (goal) 66'; Peersman (red card) 90'	Stadium: Stadion Galgenwaard; Attendance: 15,281; Referee: (Netherlands) Reinold Wiedemeijer

21 February 2015 24	Heracles Almelo	1–1	Utrecht	Almelo
20:45 CET	Veldmate (yellow card) 58' (yellow-red card); Avdić 76'	Summary	Ayoub (yellow card) 34'; Haller 80'	Stadium: Polman Stadion; Attendance: 8,197; Referee: (Netherlands) Jochem Kamphuis

1 March 2015 25	Utrecht	0–0	Feyenoord	Utrecht
14:30 CET	Amrabat (yellow card) 15'; Hardeveld (yellow card) 34'; Duplan (yellow card) 42'; Letschert (yellow card) 42'	Summary	Karsdorp (yellow card) 42'; Manu (yellow card) 85'	Stadium: Stadion Galgenwaard; Attendance: 18,030; Referee: Björn Kuipers

8 March 2015 26	Utrecht	6–2	AZ Alkmaar	Utrecht
16:45 CET	Janssen 2' (yellow card) 70'; Diemers 10'; Haller 17' (pen.), 69' (pen.); Hardeveld (yellow card) 33'; Verbeek (yellow card) 41'; Peterson 84'; Duplan 89'	Summary	Johansson (yellow card) 16'; Elm (yellow card) 22'; Berghuis (yellow card) 41'; Gudelj (yellow card) 53'; Jóhannsson 56'; Henriksen (yellow card) 86'; Markiet 88' (o.g.)	Stadium: Stadion Galgenwaard; Attendance: 18,120; Referee: Eric Braamhaar

14 March 2015 27	SC Cambuur	3–1	Utrecht	Leeuwarden
19:45 CET	Bakker 18' (pen.) van de Streek (yellow card) 21' (goal) 28'; Bijker (yellow card) 90+1'; Rosheuvel 90+5'	Report	Haller (yellow card) 13'; Verbeek (yellow card) 14'; Diemers (yellow card) 17'; Duplan 26'; Ayoub (yellow card) 60' van der Maarel (yellow card) 90+4'	Stadium: Cambuur Stadion; Attendance: 9,685; Referee: Kevin Blom

20 March 2015 28	Utrecht	3–4	NAC Breda	Utrecht
20:00 CET	Duplan 34'; Markiet 72'; Méndez 87'	Report	Falkenburg 32', 49' van der Weg 75'; Seuntjens 81'	Stadium: Stadion Galgenwaard; Attendance: 17,681; Referee: Dennis Hilger

5 April 2015 29	Utrecht	1–1	AFC Ajax	Utrecht
12:30 CEST	Diemers (yellow card) 53'; Markiet 85'; Leeuwin (red card) 87'	Report	Leeuwin 51' (o.g.); Bazoer (yellow card) 65'; Veltman (yellow card) 79'	Stadium: Stadion Galgenwaard; Attendance: 19,000; Referee: Pol van Boekel

12 April 2015 30	ADO Den Haag	2–0	Utrecht	The Hague
16:45 CEST	Alberg 73' (pen.); Kastaneer 85'	Report	Janssen (yellow card) 72'	Stadium: Cars Jeans Stadion; Attendance: 10,102; Referee: Jochen Kamphuis

19 April 2015 31	Utrecht	1–0	FC Twente	Utrecht
16:45 CEST	Hardeveld (yellow card) 51'; Haller 55'; Verbeek (yellow card) 83'	Report	Schilder (yellow card) 73'	Stadium: Stadion Galgenwaard; Attendance: 17,219; Referee: Ed Janssen

25 April 2015 32	Go Ahead Eagles	0–2	Utrecht	Deventer
19:45 CEST			Haller 19', 61'; Heerings (yellow card) 34'; Diemers (yellow card) 72'	Stadium: De Adelaarshorst; Attendance: 8,011; Referee: Björn Kuipers

10 May 2015 33	Utrecht	2–2	SBV Excelsior	Utrecht
14:30 CEST	Haller 60' (pen.); Verbeek 84'	Report	Karami (yellow card) 24' van Weert 75', 79' (yellow card) 90+3'; Badjeck (yellow card) 77'	Stadium: Stadion Galgenwaard; Attendance: 17,507; Referee: Richard Liesveld

17 May 2015 34	SBV Vitesse	3–3	Utrecht	Arnhem
14:30 CEST	Bertrand Traoré 13', 25'; Kashia (yellow card) 88'; Labyad 89'	Report	Ayoub 44'; Ramselaar 45+1'; Verbeek 88'	Stadium: GelreDome; Attendance: 18,696; Referee: Danny Makkelie

=== KNVB Cup ===
25 September 2014 Second round	PSV	2–0	FC Utrecht	Eindhoven
20:45	Willems 2'; Cortie 18' (o.g.)			Stadium: Philips Stadion; Attendance: 18,000; Referee: Eric Braamhaar

== Statistics ==
=== Appearances and goals ===
Appearances for competitive matches only

No.	Pos	Nat	Player	Total		Eredivisie		KNVB Cup	
No.	Pos	Nat	Player	Apps	Goals	Apps	Goals	Apps	Goals
1	GK	(Netherlands) NED	Robbin Ruiter	15	0	14+0	0	1+0	0
2	DF	(Netherlands) NED	Mark van der Maarel	15	0	15+0	0	0	0
3	DF	(Netherlands) NED	Ramon Leeuwin	16	0	16+0	0	0	0
5	DF	(Netherlands) NED	Christian Kum	16	0	14+1	0	1+0	0
6	MF	(Morocco) MAR	Anouar Kali	11	0	10+0	0	1+0	0
7	MF	(France) FRA	Édouard Duplan	4	0	4+0	0	0	0
8	MF	(Netherlands) NED	Willem Janssen	15	0	15+0	0	0	0
9	FW	(Netherlands) NED	Ruud Boymans	10	0	8+1	0	0+1	0
10	FW	(Netherlands) NED	Nacer Barazite	11	0	5+6	0	0	0
11	FW	(Australia) AUS	Tommy Oar	13	0	12+0	0	1+0	0
13	DF	(Netherlands) NED	Gévero Markiet	18	0	16+1	0	1+0	0
14	DF	(Netherlands) NED	Kai Heerings	9	0	2+6	0	1+0	0
15	MF	(Netherlands) NED	Mark Diemers	7	0	3+3	0	1+0	0
16	MF	(Morocco) MAR	Yassin Ayoub	16	0	15+0	0	1+0	0
17	DF	(Australia) AUS	Michael Zullo	0	0	0+0	0	0	0
18	MF	(Spain) ESP	Fernando Quesada	0	0	0+0	0	0	0
20	FW	(Netherlands) NED	Danny Verbeek (on loan from Standard Liège)	2	0	0+2	0	0	0
21	FW	(Netherlands) NED	Kristoffer Peterson	13	0	9+3	0	1+0	0
24	DF	(Netherlands) NED	Yannick Cortie	4	0	0+3	0	1+0	0
25	DF	(Netherlands) NED	Timo Letschert (on loan from Roda JC Kerkrade)	9	0	4+4	0	0+1	0
26	MF	(Netherlands) NED	Sean Klaiber	1	0	0+1	0	0	0
27	FW	(Netherlands) NED	Gyliano van Velzen	2	0	1+1	0	0	0
30	GK	(Netherlands) NED	Jeroen Verhoeven	5	0	3+2	0	0	0
34	DF	(Netherlands) NED	Jeff Hardeveld	1	0	1+0	0	0	0
37	FW	(Netherlands) NED	Gyrano Kerk	4	0	2+2	0	0	0
39	FW	(Cameroon) CMR	Cedric Badjeck	1	0	1+0	0	0	0
41	MF	(Netherlands) NED	Hamza Boukhari	0	0	0+0	0	0	0
44	MF	(Morocco) MAR	Sofyan Amrabat	1	0	0+1	0	0	0
45	FW	(United States) USA	Rubio Rubin	15	0	12+2	0	1+0	0
47	FW	(Netherlands) NED	Rodney Antwi	4	0	1+2	0	0+1	0
49	FW	(Netherlands) NED	Issa Kallon	3	0	1+2	0	0	0

=== Top assists ===
Rank	Pos	No.	Player	Eredivisie	KNVB Cup	Total
1	FW	11	(Australia) Tommy Oar	7	0	7
2	FW	45	(United States) Rubio Rubin	5	0	5
3	DF	2	(Netherlands) Mark van der Maarel	2	0	2
3	MF	16	(Morocco) Yassine Ayoub	2	0	2
3	MF	21	(Sweden) Kristoffer Peterson	2	0	2
3	FW	7	(France) Édouard Duplan	2	0	2
7	FW	9	(Netherlands) Ruud Boymans	1	0	1
7	FW	21	(Netherlands) Nacer Barazite	1	0	1

== Transfers ==
=== In ===
No.	Pos.	Player	Transferred from	Fee/notes	Date	Source
45	FW	(United States) Rubio Rubin	(United States) Portland Timbers	Free transfer	30 July 2014	
44	MF	(Morocco) Sofyan Amrabat	The Academy	Free transfer	2 August 2014	
37	MF	(Netherlands) Gyrano Kerk	(Netherlands) Zeeburgia	Free transfer	2 August 2014	
47	FW	(Netherlands) Rodney Antwi	The Academy	Free transfer	4 August 2014	
49	FW	(Netherlands) Issa Kallon	The Academy	Free transfer	4 August 2014	

=== Loan in ===
No.	Pos.	Player	Loaned from	Start	End	Source
20	FW	(Netherlands) Danny Verbeek	(Belgium) Standard Liège	17 June 2014	1 June 2015	
25	DF	(Netherlands) Timo Letschert	(Netherlands) Roda JC Kerkrade	1 September 2014	1 June 2015	

=== Loan out ===
No.	Pos.	Player	Loaned to	Start	End	Source
19	MF	(Australia) Adam Sarota	(Australia) Brisbane Roar	20 September 2014	17 May 2015	
