= List of Dutch football transfers summer 2014 =

This is a list of transfers in Dutch football for the 2014 Summer transfer window. Only moves featuring an Eredivisie side are listed.

The summer transfer window will open on July 1, 2014, and will close on September 2. Deals may be signed at any given moment in the season, but the actual transfer may only take place during the transfer window. Unattached players may sign at any moment.

Date	Name	Moving from	Moving to	Fee
1 December 2013^{1}	(Netherlands) Warner Hahn	(Netherlands) FC Dordrecht	(Netherlands) Feyenoord	Free
29 January 2014^{1}	(Netherlands) Darryl Lachman	(Netherlands) PEC Zwolle	(Netherlands) FC Twente	Free
17 March 2014^{1}	(Netherlands) Richairo Zivkovic	(Netherlands) FC Groningen	(Netherlands) Ajax	€2,500,000
26 March 2014^{1}	(Netherlands) Bob Schepers	(Netherlands) FC Utrecht	(Netherlands) SC Cambuur Leeuwarden	Free
31 March 2014^{1}	(Netherlands) Willem Janssen	(Netherlands) FC Twente	(Netherlands) FC Utrecht	Free
4 April 2014^{1}	(Belgium) Brian Vandenbussche	(Netherlands) Heerenveen	(Belgium) AA Gent	Free
4 April 2014^{1}	(Sweden) Viktor Noring	(Norway) Bodø/Glimt	(Netherlands) Heerenveen	Free
30 April 2014^{1}	(Netherlands) Nick de Bondt	(Netherlands) Ajax	(Netherlands) Go Ahead Eagles	Free
4 May 2014^{1}	(Netherlands) Ben Rienstra	(Netherlands) Heracles Almelo	(Netherlands) PEC Zwolle	Undisclosed
6 May 2014^{1}	(Netherlands) Joeri de Kamps	(Netherlands) Ajax	(Netherlands) NAC Breda	Free
14 May 2014^{1}	(Netherlands) Ramon Leeuwin	(Netherlands) SC Cambuur Leeuwarden	(Netherlands) FC Utrecht	Free
15 May 2014^{1}	(Poland) Arkadiusz Milik	(Germany) Bayer Leverkusen	(Netherlands) Ajax	Loan
15 May 2014^{1}	(Netherlands) Erik Falkenburg	(Netherlands) Go Ahead Eagles	(Netherlands) NAC Breda	Free
16 May 2014^{1}	(Netherlands) Robin van der Meer	(Netherlands) ADO Den Haag	(Netherlands) Go Ahead Eagles	Free
17 May 2014^{1}	(Netherlands) Soufian Moro	(Netherlands) FC Utrecht	(Netherlands) PEC Zwolle	Free
19 May 2014^{1}	(Netherlands) Arnold Kruiswijk	(Netherlands) FC Groningen	(Netherlands) Vitesse Arnhem	Free
19 May 2014^{1}	(Denmark) Stephan Andersen	(Netherlands) Go Ahead Eagles	(Denmark) F.C. Copenhagen	Free
21 May 2014^{1}	(Netherlands) Tom Beugelsdijk	(Netherlands) ADO Den Haag	(Germany) FSV Frankfurt	Free
22 May 2014^{1}	(Serbia) Aleksandar Bjelica	(Netherlands) FC Utrecht	(Netherlands) Sparta Rotterdam	Loan
22 May 2014^{1}	(Netherlands) Xander Houtkoop	(Netherlands) Go Ahead Eagles	(Netherlands) ADO Den Haag	Free
22 May 2014^{1}	(Belgium) Steve De Ridder	(Netherlands) FC Utrecht	(Denmark) F.C. Copenhagen	€2,000,000
23 May 2014^{1}	(Netherlands) Etiënne Reijnen	(Netherlands) AZ	(Netherlands) SC Cambuur	Free
23 May 2014^{1}	(Netherlands) Anthony Lurling	(Netherlands) Heerenveen	(Netherlands) FC Den Bosch	Free
24 May 2014^{1}	(Netherlands) Nick Viergever	(Netherlands) AZ	(Netherlands) Ajax	€2,000,000
26 May 2014^{1}	(Ukraine) Denys Oliynyk	(Ukraine) Dnipro Dnipropetrovsk	(Netherlands) Vitesse Arnhem	Free
27 May 2014^{1}	(Netherlands) Calvin Mac-Intosch	(Netherlands) Telstar	(Netherlands) SC Cambuur	Free
28 May 2014^{1}	(Netherlands) Danny Hoesen	(Netherlands) Ajax	(Netherlands) FC Groningen	€800,000
28 May 2014^{1}	(Netherlands) Furdjel Narsingh	(Netherlands) PEC Zwolle	(Netherlands) SC Cambuur	Free
30 May 2014^{1}	(Netherlands) Sven Nieuwpoort	(Netherlands) Ajax	(Netherlands) Go Ahead Eagles	Free
31 May 2014^{1}	(Netherlands) Jordy Buijs	(Netherlands) NAC Breda	(Netherlands) Heerenveen	Free
1 June 2014^{1}	(Netherlands) Leon ter Wielen	(Netherlands) PEC Zwolle	(Netherlands) Achilles '29	Free
3 June 2014^{1}	(Netherlands) Bas Sibum	(Belgium) Waasland-Beveren	(Netherlands) Heracles Almelo	Free
3 June 2014^{1}	(Belgium) Bram Castro	(Netherlands) MVV Maastricht	(Netherlands) Heracles Almelo	Free
6 June 2014^{1}	(Montenegro) Aleksandar Boljević	(Montenegro) FK Zeta	(Netherlands) PSV	Undisclosed
6 June 2014^{1}	(Netherlands) Joey Pelupessy	(Netherlands) FC Twente	(Netherlands) Heracles	Free
9 June 2014^{1}	(Netherlands) Lars Veldwijk	(Netherlands) Excelsior	(England) Nottingham Forest	Undisclosed
9 June 2014^{1}	(Netherlands) Peter van Ooijen	(Netherlands) PSV	(Netherlands) Go Ahead Eagles	Free
10 June 2014^{1}	(Netherlands) Rajiv van La Parra	(Netherlands) Heerenveen	(England) Wolverhampton Wanderers	Free
12 June 2014^{1}	(Netherlands) Mickey van der Hart	(Netherlands) Ajax	(Netherlands) Go Ahead Eagles	Loan
13 June 2014^{1}	(Netherlands) Mart Lieder	(Netherlands) RKC Waalwijk	(Netherlands) FC Dordrecht	Free
17 June 2014^{1}	(Netherlands) Ruud Boymans	(Netherlands) AZ	(Netherlands) FC Utrecht	Undisclosed
17 June 2014^{1}	(Netherlands) Danny Verbeek	(Belgium) Standard Liège	(Netherlands) FC Utrecht	Loan
17 June 2014^{1}	(Netherlands) Fred Benson	(Netherlands) PEC Zwolle	(Moldova) Sheriff Tiraspol	Free
17 June 2014^{1}	(Netherlands) Daan Bovenberg	(Netherlands) NEC	(Netherlands) Excelsior	Free
18 June 2014^{1}	(Croatia) Robert Murić	(Croatia) Dinamo Zagreb	(Netherlands) Ajax	Free
18 June 2014^{1}	(Germany) Nils Röseler	(Netherlands) FC Twente	(Germany) Chemnitzer FC	Free
19 June 2014^{1}	(Poland) Mateusz Klich	(Netherlands) PEC Zwolle	(Germany) VfL Wolfsburg	€750,000
19 June 2014^{1}	(Netherlands) Dave Bulthuis	(Netherlands) FC Utrecht	(Germany) 1. FC Nürnberg	€1,000,000
19 June 2014^{1}	(Netherlands) Djavan Anderson	(Netherlands) Ajax	(Netherlands) AZ	€200,000
19 June 2014^{1}	(Netherlands) Jules Reimerink	(Netherlands) VVV-Venlo	(Netherlands) Go Ahead Eagles	Free
20 June 2014^{1}	(Netherlands) Jarchinio Antonia	(Netherlands) Go Ahead Eagles	(Netherlands) FC Groningen	€200,000
20 June 2014^{1}	(Norway) Morten Thorsby	(Norway) Stabæk IF	(Netherlands) Heerenveen	Undisclosed
22 June 2014^{1}	(Denmark) Thomas Kristensen	(Denmark) F.C. Copenhagen	(Netherlands) ADO Den Haag	Free
23 June 2014^{1}	(Netherlands) Marco Bizot	(Netherlands) FC Groningen	(Belgium) Racing Genk	Undisclosed
23 June 2014^{1}	(Netherlands) Sergio Padt	(Belgium) AA Gent	(Netherlands) FC Groningen	Undisclosed
24 June 2014^{1}	(Netherlands) Christian Kum	(Netherlands) Heerenveen	(Netherlands) FC Utrecht	Free
25 June 2014^{1}	(Netherlands) Guus Hupperts	(Netherlands) Roda JC	(Netherlands) AZ	€1,000,000
25 June 2014^{1}	(Netherlands) Giliano Wijnaldum	(Netherlands) FC Groningen	(Netherlands) Go Ahead Eagles	Undisclosed
26 June 2014^{1}	(Sweden) Muamer Tanković	(England) Fulham	(Netherlands) AZ	Free
26 June 2014^{1}	(Morocco) Anouar Kali	(Netherlands) Roda JC	(Netherlands) FC Utrecht	Free
26 June 2014^{1}	(United States) Rubio Rubin	(United States) Portland Timbers	(Netherlands) FC Utrecht	Free
26 June 2014^{1}	(Netherlands) Remko Pasveer	(Netherlands) Heracles Almelo	(Netherlands) PSV	Free
27 June 2014^{1}	(Netherlands) Ramon Zomer	(Netherlands) Heerenveen	(Netherlands) Heracles Almelo	Free
27 June 2014^{1}	(Bosnia and Herzegovina) Marko Maletić	(Germany) VfB Stuttgart	(Netherlands) Excelsior	Undisclosed
28 June 2014^{1}	(Netherlands) Alex Schalk	(Netherlands) NAC Breda	(Netherlands) Go Ahead Eagles	Free
28 June 2014^{1}	(Netherlands) Mark-Jan Fledderus	(Netherlands) Roda JC	(Netherlands) Heracles Almelo	Free
30 June 2014^{1}	(Brazil) Wallace	(England) Chelsea	(Netherlands) Vitesse Arnhem	Loan
30 June 2014^{1}	(Netherlands) Erik Heijblok	(Netherlands) AZ	(Netherlands) FC Volendam	Free
1 July 2014	(Netherlands) Siem de Jong	(Netherlands) Ajax	(England) Newcastle United	€7,000,000
1 July 2014	(Netherlands) Kees Kwakman	(Netherlands) NAC Breda	(South Africa) Bidvest Wits	Free
1 July 2014	(Ghana) Kingsley Boateng	(Italy) A.C. Milan	(Netherlands) NAC Breda	Free
2 July 2014	(Iceland) Alfreð Finnbogason	(Netherlands) Heerenveen	(Spain) Real Sociedad	€8,000,000
3 July 2014	(Morocco) Nacer Barazite	(France) AS Monaco	(Netherlands) FC Utrecht	Free
3 July 2014	(Greece) Kostas Lamprou	(Netherlands) Feyenoord	(Netherlands) Willem II	Loan
4 July 2014	(Slovenia) Tim Matavž	(Netherlands) PSV	(Germany) FC Augsburg	€4,000,000
4 July 2014	(Poland) Przemysław Tytoń	(Netherlands) PSV	(Spain) Elche	Loan
4 July 2014	(Netherlands) Christian Supusepa	(Netherlands) ADO Den Haag	(Bulgaria) CSKA Sofia	Free
7 July 2014	(Denmark) Mathias Jattah-Njie Jørgensen	(Netherlands) PSV	(Denmark) F.C. Copenhagen	€670,000
7 July 2014	(Netherlands) Martijn van der Laan	(Netherlands) SC Cambuur	(Netherlands) FC Groningen	€460,000
8 July 2014	(Serbia) Dušan Tadić	(Netherlands) FC Twente	(England) Southampton	€14,000,000
9 July 2014	(Venezuela) Roberto Rosales	(Netherlands) FC Twente	(Spain) Málaga	Free
10 July 2014	(Greece) Nikolaos Ioannidis	(Greece) Olympiacos	(Netherlands) PEC Zwolle	Loan
10 July 2014	(Netherlands) Chiel Kramer	(Netherlands) Heerenveen	(Netherlands) FC Eindhoven	Free
11 July 2014	(Netherlands) Roy Beerens	(Netherlands) AZ	(Germany) Hertha BSC	€1,500,000
11 July 2014	(Iceland) Jóhann Berg Guðmundsson	(Netherlands) AZ	(England) Charlton Athletic	Free
11 July 2014	(Serbia) Dejan Meleg	(Netherlands) Ajax	(Netherlands) SC Cambuur	Loan
11 July 2014	(Netherlands) Fabian Sporkslede	(Netherlands) Ajax	(Netherlands) Willem II	Loan
11 July 2014	(Denmark) Martin Hansen	(Denmark) FC Nordsjælland	(Netherlands) ADO Den Haag	Undisclosed
11 July 2014	(Armenia) Norair Aslanyan Mamedov	(Netherlands) Willem II	(Netherlands) Almere City	Loan
12 July 2014	(Italy) Graziano Pellè	(Netherlands) Feyenoord	(England) Southampton	Undisclosed
12 July 2014	(Netherlands) Luuk de Jong	(Germany) Borussia Mönchengladbach	(Netherlands) PSV	€5,500,000
13 July 2014	(Netherlands) Kaj Ramsteijn	(Netherlands) Feyenoord	(Portugal) Marítimo	Free
14 July 2014	(Netherlands) Khalid Boulahrouz	(Denmark) Brøndby IF	(Netherlands) Feyenoord	Free
14 July 2014	(Germany) Dimitrios Ferfelis	(Germany) TuS Koblenz	(Netherlands) PEC Zwolle	Undisclosed
14 July 2014	(France) Rémy Amieux	(Netherlands) RKC Waalwijk	(Netherlands) NAC Breda	Free
14 July 2014	(North Macedonia) Aleksandar Damčevski	(Bulgaria) Chernomorets Burgas	(Netherlands) NAC Breda	Free
15 July 2014	(Netherlands) Daryl Janmaat	(Netherlands) Feyenoord	(England) Newcastle United	€7,500,000
15 July 2014	(Netherlands) Bruno Martins Indi	(Netherlands) Feyenoord	(Portugal) F.C. Porto	€7,700,000
15 July 2014	(Denmark) Kasper Kusk	(Denmark) Aalborg BK	(Netherlands) FC Twente	€750,000
16 July 2014	(Netherlands) Daniël de Ridder	(Netherlands) RKC Waalwijk	(Netherlands) SC Cambuur	Undisclosed
17 July 2014	(Sweden) Johan Mårtensson	(Netherlands) FC Utrecht	(Sweden) Helsingborgs IF	Free
21 July 2014	(Israel) Ben Sahar	(Germany) Hertha BSC	(Netherlands) Willem II	Free
21 July 2014	(Japan) Mike Havenaar	(Netherlands) Vitesse Arnhem	(Spain) Córdoba	Free
24 July 2014	(Netherlands) Lesley de Sa	(Netherlands) Ajax	(Netherlands) Go Ahead Eagles	Loan
24 July 2014	(Nigeria) Abiola Dauda	(Serbia) Red Star Belgrade	(Netherlands) Vitesse Arnhem	€500,000
24 July 2014	(Poland) Filip Kurto	(Netherlands) Roda JC	(Netherlands) FC Dordrecht	Free
25 July 2014	(Slovakia) Albert Rusnák	(England) Manchester City	(Netherlands) SC Cambuur	Loan
25 July 2014	(Denmark) Oliver Feldballe	(Netherlands) SC Cambuur	(Norway) Sarpsborg 08	Free
28 July 2014	(Netherlands) Stefan de Vrij	(Netherlands) Feyenoord	(Italy) Lazio	€7,500,000
31 July 2014	(Finland) Thomas Lam	(Netherlands) AZ	(Netherlands) PEC Zwolle	Free
31 July 2014	(Australia) Luke Wilkshire	(Russia) Dinamo Moskva	(Netherlands) Feyenoord	Free
31 July 2014	(Netherlands) Bilal Başaçikoğlu	(Netherlands) Heerenveen	(Netherlands) Feyenoord	€3,500,000
31 July 2014	(Denmark) Thomas Dalgaard	(Denmark) Viborg FF	(Netherlands) Heerenveen	€700,000
31 July 2014	(Sweden) Isak Ssewankambo	(England) Chelsea	(Netherlands) NAC Breda	Free
1 August 2014	(Serbia) Andrija Luković	(Serbia) FK Rad	(Netherlands) PSV	Undisclosed
4 August 2014	(Chile) Stefano Magnasco	(Netherlands) FC Groningen	(Chile) Universidad Católica	€170,000
5 August 2014	(Australia) Jason Davidson	(Netherlands) Heracles Almelo	(England) West Bromwich Albion	Undisclosed
5 August 2014	(Germany) Christian Dorda	(Netherlands) FC Utrecht	(Belgium) Westerlo	Free
6 August 2014	(Netherlands) Rydell Poepon	(Netherlands) ADO Den Haag	(France) Valenciennes	Undisclosed
7 August 2014	(Netherlands) Jody Lukoki	(Netherlands) Ajax	(Netherlands) PEC Zwolle	Undisclosed
8 August 2014	(Iceland) Victor Pálsson	(Netherlands) NEC Nijmegen	(Sweden) Helsingborgs IF	Undisclosed
8 August 2014	(Netherlands) Quincy Promes	(Netherlands) FC Twente	(Russia) Spartak Moskva	€15,000,000
8 August 2014	(South Africa) Kamohelo Mokotjo	(Netherlands) PEC Zwolle	(Netherlands) FC Twente	€1,500,000
9 August 2014	(Serbia) Filip Kostić	(Netherlands) FC Groningen	(Germany) VfB Stuttgart	€6,000,000
11 August 2014	(North Macedonia) Samir Fazli	(Netherlands) Heerenveen	(Switzerland) FC Wil 1900	Free
11 August 2014	(Lithuania) Vytautas Andriuškevičius	(Sweden) Djurgårdens IF	(Netherlands) SC Cambuur	Free
11 August 2014	(Czech Republic) Tomáš Necid	(Russia) CSKA Moskva	(Netherlands) PEC Zwolle	Loan
11 August 2014	(Norway) Marcus Pedersen	(Netherlands) Vitesse Arnhem	(Norway) Brann	Undisclosed
12 August 2014	(Romania) Cătălin Țîră	(Netherlands) ADO Den Haag	(Romania) FC Brașov	Free
13 August 2014	(Netherlands) Frank van der Struijk	(Netherlands) Vitesse Arnhem	(Netherlands) Willem II	Free
13 August 2014	(Zimbabwe) Marvelous Nakamba	(France) AS Nancy	(Netherlands) Vitesse Arnhem	Undisclosed
13 August 2014	(Sweden) Sam Larsson	(Sweden) IFK Göteborg	(Netherlands) Heerenveen	Undisclosed
13 August 2014	(Zambia) Jacob Mulenga	(Netherlands) FC Utrecht	(Turkey) Adana Demirspor	Free
13 August 2014	(Belgium) Mike Vanhamel	(France) Stade Laval	(Netherlands) NEC	Free
13 August 2014	(Netherlands) André Krul	(Netherlands) FC Groningen	Puerto Rico Bayamón	Free
15 August 2014	(Sweden) Denni Avdić	(Netherlands) AZ	(Netherlands) Heracles	Loan
15 August 2014	(Netherlands) Jordy van Deelen	(Netherlands) Feyenoord	(Netherlands) FC Dordrecht	Free
15 August 2014	(England) Colin Kazim-Richards	(Turkey) Bursaspor	(Netherlands) Feyenoord	Loan
17 August 2014	(Netherlands) Danny Holla	(Netherlands) ADO Den Haag	(England) Brighton & Hove Albion	Free
17 August 2014	(Netherlands) Hakim Ziyech	(Netherlands) Heerenveen	(Netherlands) FC Twente	Undisclosed
18 August 2014	(Netherlands) Donny Gorter	(Netherlands) AZ	(Denmark) Aalborg BK	Loan
18 August 2014	(Netherlands) Giovanni Gravenbeek	(Netherlands) PEC Zwolle	(Netherlands) NEC	Free
18 August 2014	(England) Josh McEachran	(England) Chelsea	(Netherlands) Vitesse Arnhem	Loan
19 August 2014	(Cape Verde) Josimar Lima	(United Arab Emirates) Al-Shaab	(Netherlands) FC Dordrecht	Free
21 August 2014	(Netherlands) Jeroen Lumu	(Bulgaria) Ludogorets Razgrad	(Netherlands) Heerenveen	Free
22 August 2014	(Netherlands) Mimoun Mahi	(Netherlands) Sparta Rotterdam	(Netherlands) FC Groningen	€400,000
22 August 2014	(Netherlands) Jens Toornstra	(Netherlands) FC Utrecht	(Netherlands) Feyenoord	€3,500,000
23 August 2014	(North Macedonia) Denis Mahmudov	(Netherlands) PEC Zwolle	(Netherlands) Sparta Rotterdam	Loan
25 August 2014	(Netherlands) Geoffrey Castillion	(Netherlands) Ajax	(United States) New England Revolution	Free
26 August 2014	(Mexico) Andrés Guardado	(Spain) Valencia	(Netherlands) PSV	Loan
26 August 2014	(Belgium) Timothy Derijck	(Netherlands) PSV	(Netherlands) ADO Den Haag	Free
26 August 2014	(Netherlands) Robert Mühren	(Netherlands) FC Volendam	(Netherlands) AZ	€300,000
27 August 2014	(Sweden) Kristoffer Peterson	(England) Liverpool	(Netherlands) FC Utrecht	Undisclosed
27 August 2014	(Sweden) Samuel Armenteros	(Belgium) Anderlecht	(Netherlands) Willem II	Loan
28 August 2014	(Netherlands) Sander Duits	(Netherlands) RKC Waalwijk	(Netherlands) Go Ahead Eagles	Undisclosed
29 August 2014	(Netherlands) Karim El Ahmadi	(England) Aston Villa	(Netherlands) Feyenoord	€700,000
30 August 2014	(Netherlands) Daley Blind	(Netherlands) Ajax	(England) Manchester United	€17,500,000
30 August 2014	(Poland) Sebastian Steblecki	(Poland) KS Cracovia	(Netherlands) SC Cambuur	Undisclosed
31 August 2014	(Netherlands) Kenneth Vermeer	(Netherlands) Ajax	(Netherlands) Feyenoord	€1,000,000
31 August 2014	(Netherlands) Leon de Kogel	(Netherlands) FC Utrecht	(Netherlands) Almere City FC	Loan
1 September 2014	(Netherlands) Diederik Boer	(Netherlands) PEC Zwolle	(Netherlands) Ajax	Undisclosed
1 September 2014	(Denmark) Niki Zimling	(Germany) FSV Mainz 05	(Netherlands) Ajax	Loan
1 September 2014	(Japan) Ryo Miyaichi	(England) Arsenal	(Netherlands) FC Twente	Loan
1 September 2014	(Netherlands) Warner Hahn	(Netherlands) Feyenoord	(Netherlands) PEC Zwolle	Loan
1 September 2014	(Netherlands) Timo Letschert	(Netherlands) Roda JC	(Netherlands) FC Utrecht	Loan
1 September 2014	(Belgium) Ryan Sanusi	(Netherlands) Willem II	(Netherlands) FC Oss	Loan
1 September 2014	(Brazil) Renan Zanelli	(Netherlands) Willem II	(Netherlands) FC Oss	Loan
1 September 2014	(Netherlands) Bart van Brakel	(Netherlands) SC Cambuur	(Netherlands) FC Oss	Loan
1 September 2014	(Netherlands) Robin Buwalda	(Netherlands) ADO Den Haag	(Netherlands) VVV-Venlo	Loan
1 September 2014	(Netherlands) Lars Hutten	(Netherlands) Excelsior	(Netherlands) Helmond Sport	Loan
1 September 2014	(Netherlands) Genaro Snijders	(Netherlands) FC Dordrecht	(Netherlands) FC Oss	Undisclosed
1 September 2014	(France) Nicolas Isimat-Mirin	(France) AS Monaco	(Netherlands) PSV	Loan
1 September 2014	(Netherlands) Robert Braber	(Netherlands) RKC Waalwijk	(Netherlands) Willem II	Undisclosed
1 September 2014	(Netherlands) Simon van Zeelst	(Netherlands) Willem II	(Netherlands) RKC Waalwijk	Loan
1 September 2014	(Netherlands) Maxime Deckers	(Netherlands) Willem II	(Netherlands) RKC Waalwijk	Loan
1 September 2014	(Netherlands) Joey Sleegers	(Netherlands) Feyenoord	(Netherlands) FC Eindhoven	Loan
1 September 2014	(Netherlands) Ruud Vormer	(Netherlands) Feyenoord	(Belgium) Club Brugge	Undisclosed
1 September 2014	(Netherlands) Yanic Wildschut	(Netherlands) Heerenveen	(England) Middlesbrough	Undisclosed
1 September 2014	(Germany) Tim Hölscher	(Netherlands) FC Twente	(Germany) Chemnitzer FC	Loan
1 September 2014	(Netherlands) Willie Overtoom	(Netherlands) AZ	(Belgium) Zulte Waregem	Free
1 September 2014	(Netherlands) Jerson Cabral	(Netherlands) FC Twente	(Netherlands) Willem II	Loan

== Notes ==
1. Transfer will take place on 1 July 2014.
