= Timo Letschert =

Dutch footballer (born 1993)

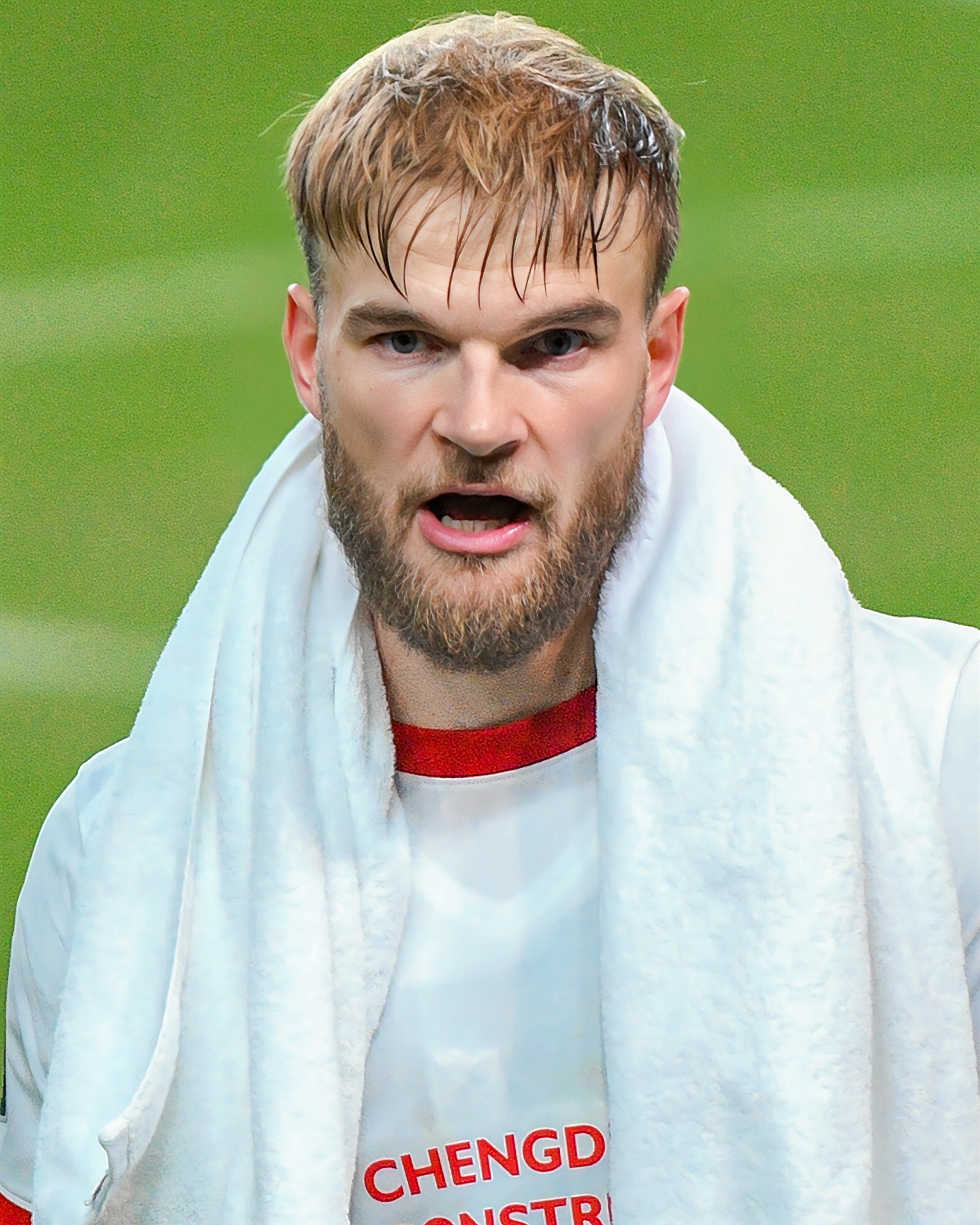
- Letschert in 2025

Personal information
- Date of birth: 25 May 1993 (age 33)
- Place of birth: Purmerend, Netherlands
- Height: 1.88 m (6 ft 2 in)
- Position: Centre-back

Team information
- Current team: AFC
- Number: 55

Youth career
- 1998–2004: SDOB
- 2004–2008: Ajax
- 2008–2010: Haarlem
- 2010–2012: Heerenveen/Emmen
- 2012–2013: Groningen

Senior career*
Years	Team	Apps	(Gls)
2013–2014	Groningen	12	(0)
2014–2015	Roda JC	15	(0)
2014–2015	→ Utrecht (loan)	23	(0)
2015–2016	Utrecht	34	(3)
2016–2019	Sassuolo	16	(0)
2018–2019	→ Utrecht (loan)	31	(2)
2019–2020	Hamburger SV	24	(2)
2020–2022	AZ	24	(0)
2022	Lyngby	5	(0)
2023	Gwangju	27	(3)
2024–2026	Chengdu Rongcheng	56	(7)
2026–	AFC	19	(0)

International career
2013	Netherlands U21	3	(0)
- * Club domestic league appearances and goals as of 15:04, 24 October 2026 (UTC)

Timo Letschert (Dutch pronunciation: [ˈtimoː ˈlɛtɕərt]; born 25 May 1993) is a Dutch retired professional footballer who played as a centre-back for Tweede Divisie club AFC.

Letschert began his football career with his hometown club, SDOB, before joining Ajax' youth academy at a young age. Ajax let him leave for the HFC Haarlem academy in 2008, and via the shared Heerenveen/Emmen academies he joined Groningen, where he made his senior debut and signed his first professional contract. He failed to break through as a starter, and joined Roda JC Kerkrade in 2014. After relegation and a contractual dispute, Letschert moved to Utrecht – first on loan and since on a permanent deal. Growing into a fixed starter, helping the club reach qualifiers for European football, he was signed by Serie A club Sassuolo in 2016. He since played on loan for Utrecht and one season for Hamburger SV in 2. Bundesliga, before returning to the Netherlands on a permanent deal, signing with AZ in 2020.

He was capped five times for his country at under-21 level. In March 2016, he received a call up for the senior team, but failed to make his full international debut.

== Club career ==
=== Early years ===
Born in Purmerend, Letschert lived in Broek in Waterland in his early years and started playing football at the local club SDOB. There, he was spotted by scouts from Ajax, and he eventually joined their famed youth academy. In 2008, he left the club with the reason that he was physically limited compared to his peers. Letschert was picked up by lower league club HFC Haarlem. After two years, he returned to the youth academy of an Eredivisie club, when he was included in the shared youth academy of SC Heerenveen and FC Emmen. After two years Letschert left Friesland. He was then allowed to trial at FC Groningen, then still playing as a midfielder. Letschert successfully enforced a contract.

=== Groningen ===
Letschert made his professional debut for Groningen on 13 April 2013 as a starter in a 2–0 victory against Heracles Almelo. He was substituted in the 85th minute for Maikel Kieftenbeld. In his first season, Letschert made three appearances for Groningen. In May 2013, he extended his contract with the club for two years. On 25 August 2013, he played his fourth game of the new season in the first team – all in the starting line-up – against Go Ahead Eagles. Behind 3–2, both Krisztián Adorján and Letschert received a red card in two minutes. In the end, substitute Género Zeefuik secured the 3–3 equaliser. After being suspended for a week, Letschert returned for the derby against Heerenveen. During this match, Makkelie dealt out three red cards. Letschert was sent off after only eleven minutes and later Mitchell Dijks from Heerenveen and Tjaronn Chery from Groningen were also sent off. Heerenveen won the game 4–2. In late-October 2013, Letschert was suspended by the Groningen club management because he was not satisfied with a place on the reserve bench. After his disciplinary suspension, the centre-back played two more games in the first team of Groningen and on 30 January 2014, both sides came to the decision to terminate the contract by mutual consent.

=== Roda JC ===
One day later, Letschert signed with Roda JC Kerkrade until the end of the season, with an option for two more years. A week after signing his contract in Kerkrade, on 8 February, the defender was allowed to make his debut for his new club. Away against NAC Breda – a game which was lost 2–0 – Letschert was in the starting line-up under head coach Jon Dahl Tomasson. He played the entire game as a right-back. In his first half season with Roda JC, he played eleven games. The season went poorly for the Limburg-based club and they fought against relegation from the Eredivisie. Of the eleven games that Letschert played, only two were won. On 3 May 2014, Roda JC played away against Go Ahead Eagles during the last matchday of the season. Letschert played the entire game as a defensive midfielder. A goal from Davy De Beule won Roda JC the match. In Amsterdam, however, direct competitor NEC managed to steal a point against Ajax; 2–2. As a result, Roda JC relegated to the Eerste Divisie as the last place in the Eredivisie. In the second tier, Letschert played the first four games as a starter for the club. At the end of August, a conflict arose between Roda JC on the one hand and Letschert and his agent Dick van Burik on the other. The latter stated that the defender's contract was not legally valid. Ultimately, the conflict led to an arbitration case. The Royal Dutch Football Association (KNVB) stated that the contract was valid and that club's willing to sign Letschert had to submit a transfer fee to secure his services.

=== Utrecht ===
After the arbitration case, Letschert was no longer welcome in the first team of Roda JC. On 1 September 2014, two days after the verdict, FC Utrecht signed him on a one-season loan deal. The club also established a contractual option to buy. Letschert played his first game for the club on 28 September in a 3–1 away loss to FC Twente. Coach Rob Alflen let Letschert come on as a substitute twelve minutes before the end of the game to replace captain Mark van der Maarel. On 19 October Letschert played his third match for Utrecht. Away against FC Dordrecht, he was allowed to make his first start for the club. He replaced Christian Kum in the starting line-up and played the entire game as a left-back. Utrecht won the game 1–3. In the 2014–15 season, Letschert played 23 games for Utrecht. Of these matches he made 19 starts. The option in his contract was subsequently triggered, and in June 2015 the club signed Letschert permanently. He signed a contract with Utrecht until mid-2018. In the 2015–16 season, Letschert remained a regular starter and he often formed a duo at the center of the defense with Ramon Leeuwin or Van der Maarel. On 29 August 2015, he scored for his first goal as a professional football. At home, he secured a 2–0 win in injury time on a pass from Sébastien Haller against his former club Groningen, after Bart Ramselaar had opened the score. With Utrecht, Letschert qualified for European play-offs. There, he beat PEC Zwolle, but Heracles Almelo then proved too strong and qualified for the UEFA Europa League.

=== Sassuolo ===
On 3 August 2016, it was announced that Letschert had signed a four-year contract with Italian Serie A club Sassuolo for a deal worth €4 million. He made his debut for the club on 25 August 2016. That day, he came in for Domenico Berardi in the 72nd minute during a match against Red Star Belgrade in the final qualifying round of the UEFA Europa League. The game ended 1–1. That, in combination with an earlier victory at home, was enough to reach the main tournament. In Sassuolo, Letschert could, however, not prevail and he finished his first season in Serie A with nine appearances. He would also remain a reserve in the 2017–18 season, where he played in seven Serie A games.

On 17 August 2018, Letschert returned to Eredivisie side Utrecht on loan with an option to buy. There he immediately established himself again as a regular starter and appeared in 31 league games in which he scored two goals. In the following pre-season for the 2019–20 season, Letschert did not return to the main squad of Sassuolo, but retained his fitness with other reserves on the club training ground while the first team moved to a training camp in Trentino.

=== Hamburger SV ===
On 24 July 2019, Letschert joined 2. Bundesliga club Hamburger SV on a deal until the end of 2019–20 season. In his first week of practice, he partially tore an outer ligament in his knee and was out until mid-September. By then, Rick van Drongelen and Gideon Jung had established themselves as a partnership in central defense under head coach Dieter Hecking. Letschert made his first brief appearance on 28 September in a 2–2 draw away against SSV Jahn Regensburg, coming on as a substitute in the 79th minute for Jung. After alternating between the starting line-up and the bench in the following games, he prevailed as a regular starter from December and was used in the starting line-up until the end of the season. While Letschert was in central defense, his compatriot Van Drongelen usually played alongside him in defense, but also occasionally Ewerton or Jordan Beyer. Prior to the final matchday, Letschert suffered an inner ligament strain in his knee during practice, which ended the season for him. Letschert made 24 appearances in the 2. Bundesliga in which he scored two goals. Finishing in fourth place of the league table, HSV missed promotion to the Bundesliga for a second consecutive year, whereupon his expiring contract was not extended.

=== AZ ===
After leaving Hamburger SV as a free agent he signed a three-year contract with AZ in September 2020. He made his debut for the club on 19 September in a match against PEC Zwolle, starting in central defense alongside Pantelis Chatzidiakos in a 1–1 home draw.

Letschert experienced a rocky start to the 2021–22 season. After two defensive errors in an away game against Twente on 23 September 2021, and as a result being substituted by head coach Pascal Jansen, Letschert left the stadium on his own. On 24 November, he was transfer-listed by the club. On 22 August 2022, Letschert's contract was terminated by mutual consent, he did not play for AZ since the Twente game.

=== Lyngby ===
On 3 October 2022, Letschert joined newly promoted Danish Superliga club Lyngby Boldklub on a deal for the rest of 2022. He made his debut for the club on 14 October, coming on as a substitute in the 74th minute for Pascal Gregor in a 2–0 loss at home against AaB. His first start came the following week against OB, which ended in a 3–1 away defeat. He left the club at the end of 2022.

=== Gwangju FC ===
On 2 January 2023, Letschert joined newly promoted Gwangju FC of the South Korean K League 1. He made his debut for the club on 25 February, the first matchday of the season, starting in a 1–0 away victory against the Suwon Samsung Bluewings. On 28 May, he scored his first goal for the club in a league win against Suwon FC. He suffered an injury in August 2023, sidelining him for several months.

=== Chengdu Rongcheng ===
On 22 February 2024, Letschert joined Chinese Super League club Chengdu Rongcheng. After finishing the 2025 season, Letschert announced his retirement through social media on 30 January 2026.

=== AFC ===
In February 2026, Letschert returned to the Netherlands, signing with Tweede Divisie club AFC at amateur level.

== International career ==
Letschert played three international matches for the Netherlands under-21 between August and October 2013.

Letschert received his first call up to the senior Netherlands national team in March 2016 for friendlies against France and England by national team coach Danny Blind.

However, as of May 2026, Letschert has never made any national team appearances.

== Career statistics ==
=== Club ===
As of match played 22 November 2025

Appearances and goals by club, season and competition
Club	Season	League			National Cup (Note: Includes KNVB Cup)		Europe		Other		Total	
Club	Season	Division	Apps	Goals	Apps	Goals	Apps	Goals	Apps	Goals	Apps	Goals
Groningen	2012–13	Eredivisie	3	0	0	0	—		—		3	0
Groningen	2013–14	Eredivisie	9	0	0	0	—		—		9	0
Groningen	Total		12	0	0	0	—		—		12	0
Roda JC	2013–14	Eredivisie	11	0	0	0	—		—		11	0
Roda JC	2014–15	Eerste Divisie	4	0	0	0	—		—		4	0
Roda JC	Total		15	0	0	0	—		—		15	0
Utrecht	2014–15	Eredivisie	23	0	1	0	—		—		24	0
Utrecht	2015–16	Eredivisie	34	3	6	0	—		0	0	40	3
Utrecht	Total		57	3	7	0	—		0	0	64	3
Sassuolo	2016–17	Serie A	9	0	0	0	3 (Note: Appearances in UEFA Europa League)	0	—		12	0
Sassuolo	2017–18	Serie A	7	0	0	0	—		—		7	0
Sassuolo	Total		16	0	0	0	3	0	—		19	0
Utrecht (loan)	2018–19	Eredivisie	31	2	2	0	—		—		33	2
Hamburg	2019–20	2. Bundesliga	24	2	0	0	—		—		24	2
AZ	2020–21	Eredivisie	20	0	1	0	2	0	—		23	0
AZ	2021–22	Eredivisie	4	0	0	0	2	0	—		6	0
AZ	Total		24	0	1	0	4	0	—		29	0
Lyngby	2022–23	Danish Superliga	5	0	0	0	—		—		5	0
Gwangju FC	2023	K League 1	27	3	0	0	—		—		27	3
Chengdu Rongcheng	2024	Chinese Super League	28	2	1	0	—		—		29	2
Chengdu Rongcheng	2025	Chinese Super League	28	5	2	0	4 (Note: Appearances in AFC Champions League Elite)	0	—		34	5
Chengdu Rongcheng	Total		56	7	3	0	4	0	—		63	7
Career total			267	17	13	0	11	0	0	0	291	17
