= Jeff Hardeveld =

Dutch footballer (born 1995)

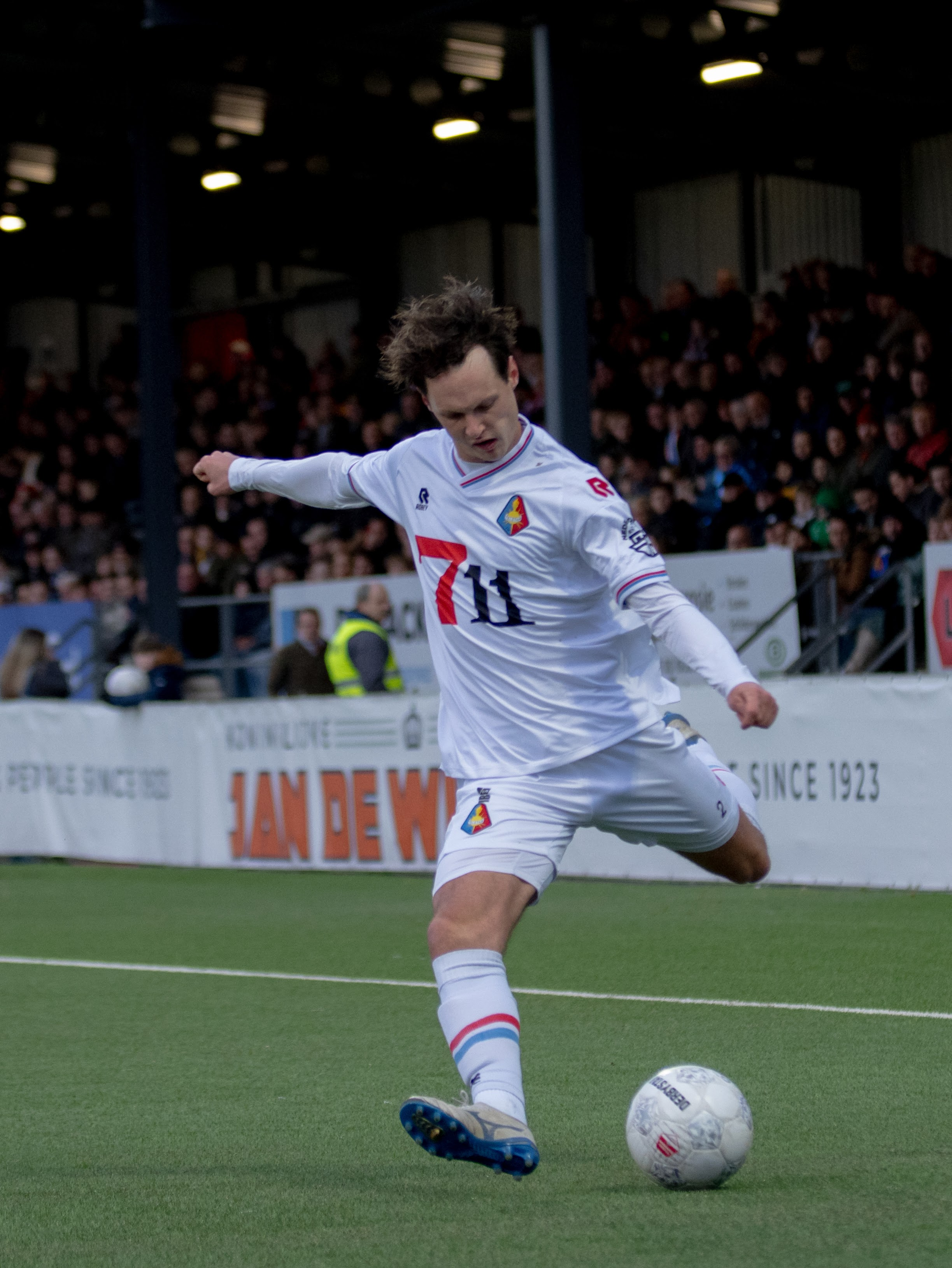
- Hardeveld with Telstar in 2025

Personal information
- Date of birth: 27 February 1995 (age 31)
- Place of birth: Delft, Netherlands
- Height: 1.84 m (6 ft 0 in)
- Position: Left-back

Team information
- Current team: Telstar
- Number: 2

Youth career
- –2009: Vitesse Delft
- 2009–2013: Feyenoord

Senior career*
Years	Team	Apps	(Gls)
2013–2014	Feyenoord	0	(0)
2014–2017	Utrecht	19	(1)
2017	Jong Utrecht	7	(0)
2017–2021	Heracles Almelo	40	(2)
2021–2024	Emmen	51	(1)
2024–	Telstar	75	(11)

International career
2013	Netherlands U18	1	(0)
2013	Netherlands U19	2	(0)
2015	Netherlands U21	1	(0)
- * Club domestic league appearances and goals as of 12:01, 14 October 2026 (UTC)

Jeff Hardeveld (born 27 February 1995) is a Dutch professional footballer who plays as a left-back for Eredivisie club Telstar.

He began his senior career with FC Utrecht after joining from Feyenoord's academy, and has since played for Heracles Almelo and FC Emmen. Despite showing promise early in his career, his progress was repeatedly hampered by serious knee injuries.

== Club career ==
=== Youth career ===
Hardeveld began his football career playing in the youth system of Vitesse Delft before joining Feyenoord's academy, starting with the under-8s. In early 2014, he was named on the bench for Feyenoord's first team during a home match against NEC.

=== Utrecht ===
In 2014, Hardeveld signed with Utrecht, where his time was marred by injuries. He made his professional debut on 20 December 2014, in an Eredivisie match against AZ, featuring in 15 matches that season. However, injuries restricted him to just one official appearance the following season. Despite his struggles, Utrecht extended his contract, showing faith in his potential.

After returning from a severe knee injury in March 2016, Hardeveld was forced to withdraw at halftime during a KNVB Cup match against VVSB, requiring surgery that ruled him out for the remainder of the season. In August 2016, another setback prolonged his rehabilitation by an additional 12 months.

=== Heracles Almelo ===
After FC Utrecht signed defenders Dario Đumić and Urby Emanuelson in the summer of 2017, Hardeveld fell out of favour and was deemed surplus to requirements. He subsequently joined Heracles Almelo, signing a two-year contract with an option for a third season.

In April 2019, Hardeveld and teammate Tim Breukers agreed new one-year contracts with Heracles, extending their stays at the club until the summer of 2020. Hardeveld's deal also included an option for a further season.

=== Emmen ===
On 29 June 2021, Hardeveld joined FC Emmen on a two-year contract with an option for the third year. His first half of the season was disrupted by injuries, limiting him to four appearances, and he was sent off in one of those matches. During that game, Shona Shukrula—whom Hardeveld later married in June 2023—served as the fourth official.

That season, Emmen secured promotion to the Eredivisie. However, on 10 September 2022, Hardeveld suffered another serious cruciate ligament injury during a league match against Excelsior, the third of his career.

After eleven months of rehabilitation, he returned to action on 11 August 2023 in Emmen's opening match of the season against Cambuur following the club's relegation to the Eerste Divisie. He marked his return by scoring the goal that made it 2–0.

=== Telstar ===
On 2 September 2024, Hardeveld joined Eerste Divisie club Telstar. He made his debut for the club on 8 September, replacing Devon Koswal in the 68th minute of a 4–0 win over MVV. On 9 February 2025, he scored his first goal for the club in a 6–0 home victory against Jong Utrecht. Telstar entered the final round of the regular season with a place in the promotion play-offs at stake, facing Hardeveld's former club Emmen in a direct contest for qualification. Telstar won 3–0, with Hardeveld scoring the second goal. He featured in all of the club's subsequent play-off matches, including a 2–2 draw and 3–1 victory over Willem II in the final round, which secured Telstar's promotion to the Eredivisie for the first time in 47 years.

On 30 June 2026, Hardeveld signed a new contract with Telstar, keeping him at the club until 2028.

== International career ==
Hardeveld was a Dutch youth international.

== Personal life ==
In 2022, he started dating Dutch referee Shona Shukrula. They married in June 2023.

== Career statistics ==
As of match played 17 May 2026

Appearances and goals by club, season and competition
Club	Season	League			KNVB Cup		Europe		Other		Total	
Club	Season	Division	Apps	Goals	Apps	Goals	Apps	Goals	Apps	Goals	Apps	Goals
Utrecht	2014–15	Eredivisie	15	1	0	0	—		—		15	1
Utrecht	2015–16	Eredivisie	0	0	1	0	—		—		1	0
Utrecht	2016–17	Eredivisie	4	0	1	0	—		3 (Note: Appearances in Eredivisie play-offs)	0	8	0
Utrecht	2017–18	Eredivisie	0	0	0	0	1 (Note: Appearance in UEFA Europa League)	0	—		1	0
Utrecht	Total		19	1	2	0	1	0	3	0	25	1
Jong Utrecht	2016–17	Eerste Divisie	7	0	—		—		—		7	0
Heracles Almelo	2017–18	Eredivisie	18	2	1	0	—		—		19	2
Heracles Almelo	2018–19	Eredivisie	0	0	0	0	—		0	0	0	0
Heracles Almelo	2019–20	Eredivisie	8	0	1	0	—		—		9	0
Heracles Almelo	2020–21	Eredivisie	14	0	2	0	—		—		16	0
Heracles Almelo	Total		40	2	4	0	—		0	0	44	2
Emmen	2021–22	Eerste Divisie	12	0	1	0	—		—		13	2
Emmen	2022–23	Eredivisie	6	0	0	0	—		—		6	0
Emmen	2023–24	Eerste Divisie	33	1	1	0	—		4 (Note: Appearances in Eerste Divisie play-offs)	0	38	1
Emmen	Total		51	1	2	0	—		4	0	57	1
Telstar	2024–25	Eerste Divisie	34	5	2	0	—		6	0	42	5
Telstar	2025–26	Eredivisie	34	6	5	1	—		—		39	7
Telstar	2026–27	Eredivisie	7	0	0	0	—		—		7	0
Telstar	Total		75	11	7	1	—		6	0	88	12
Career total			192	15	15	1	1	0	13	0	221	16

== Honours ==
Emmen

- Eerste Divisie: 2021–22
