= Shona Shukrula =

Dutch football referee

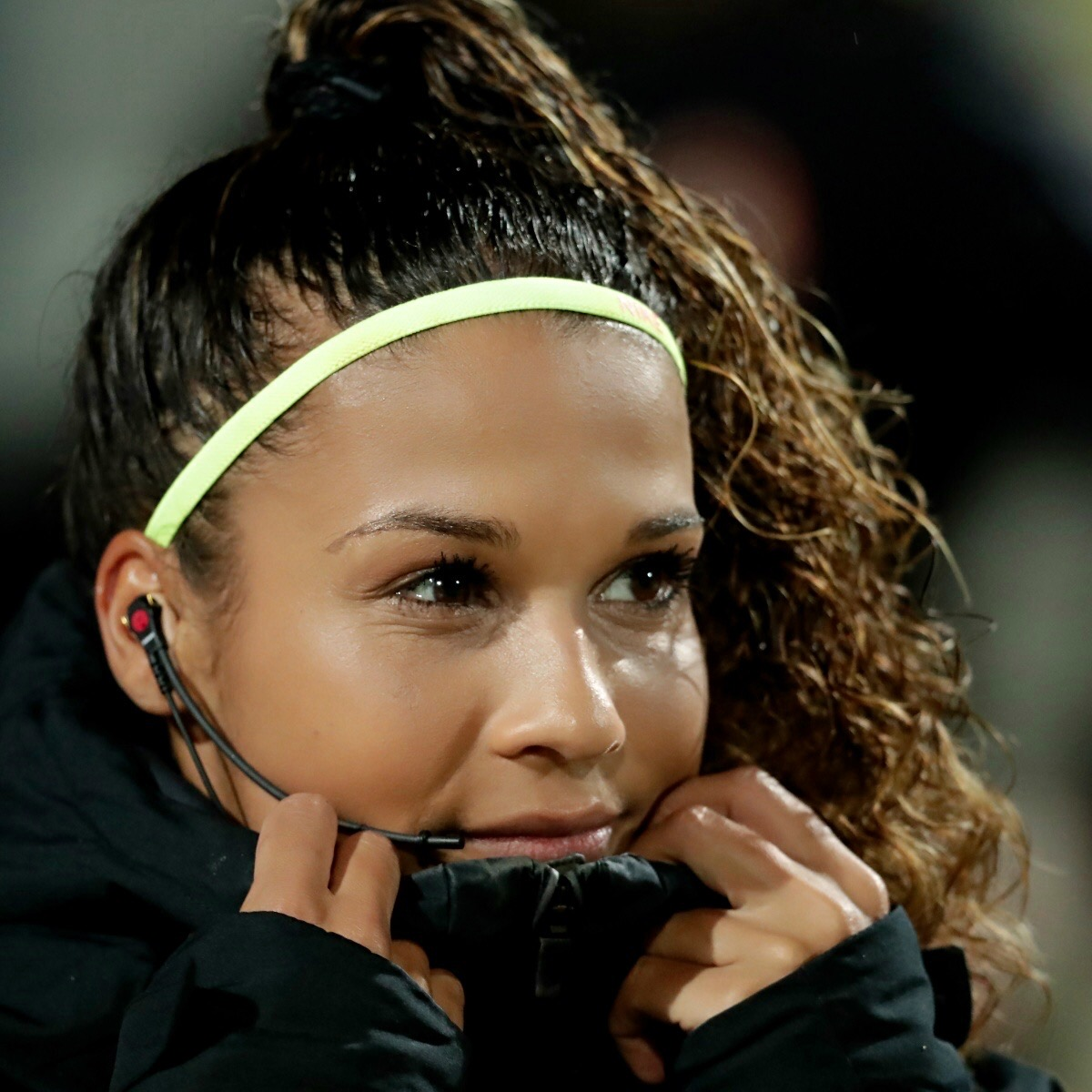
- Full name: Shona Shukrula
- Born: May 24, 1991 (age 35); Alkmaar, Netherlands

Domestic
Years	League	Role
2016–2024	Derde Divisie	Referee
2017–2019	Beloften Eredivisie	Referee
2018–2021	Vierde Divisie	Referee
2019–	Tweede Divisie	Referee
2020–	Eerste Divisie	Fourth official
2024–	Eerste Divisie	Referee

International
Years	League	Role
2017–	FIFA	Referee

Shona Shukrula (born 24 May 1991) is a Dutch football referee, the first female referee in Dutch professional football.

== Career ==
Shukrula played football until the age of 17 in the Alkmaar club AFC '34, where she also volunteered. She also became a club referee there. In the 2009/2010 season, she began officiating matches for the KNVB (Royal Dutch Football Association). In 2010, she was included in the KNVB Talent Development Program for Amateur Football.

On 13 May 2017, she debuted in the 2016–17 season of the Derde Divisie, the fourth tier of football in the Netherlands, as the referee of the Rijnsburgse Boys – VV Capelle match. On 2 June 2017, she led the KNVB Women's Cup final between Ajax and PSV.

In 2017, Shukrula became a listed referee for FIFA. Since then, she has received international assignments for Women's Champions League, Women's Championship, Women's World Cup, and also Women's Under-17 and Women's Under-19 Championship qualifiers. She made her international debut on 13 March 2017, at the 2017 Women's Under-17 Championship qualification match between Republic of Ireland and Serbia (1-0). She also led the match between Serbia and Scotland (1-2) on March 18, 2017, during the qualifications.

In 2019, she was promoted to category 2 on the FIFA list. In December 2020, UEFA announced that Shukrula had been promoted again, this time to category 1.

On December 14, 2019, Shukrula became the first woman in the Netherlands to officiate a match at the highest amateur level of men's football. This took place during the match between Jong Sparta and ASWH in the Tweede Divisie (Second Division).

On September 5, 2020, Shukrula made her debut as the first female fourth official in the Netherlands in the Eerste Divisie. This occurred during the FC Eindhoven – SC Telstar match at Jan Louwers Stadion.

In May 2024, the KNVB promoted her to the position of the first female referee in professional men's football in the Netherlands. On October 4, 2024, Shukrula made her debut as a referee in men's professional football during the match TOP Oss – ADO Den Haag in the Eerste Divisie.

On 29 October 2024, Shukrula officiated the match between Portugal and Azerbaijan at the Women's Euro 2025 qualifying play-offs.

== Personal life ==
Together with her Surinamese father, Dutch mother, and three brothers, Shukrula grew up in Alkmaar. She studied law at Vrije Universiteit Amsterdam and works as a public prosecutor for the Public Prosecution Service in North Holland.

In 2021, she started dating professional footballer Jeff Hardeveld. They married in June 2023.
