= Sébastien Haller =

Ivory Coast international footballer (born 1994)

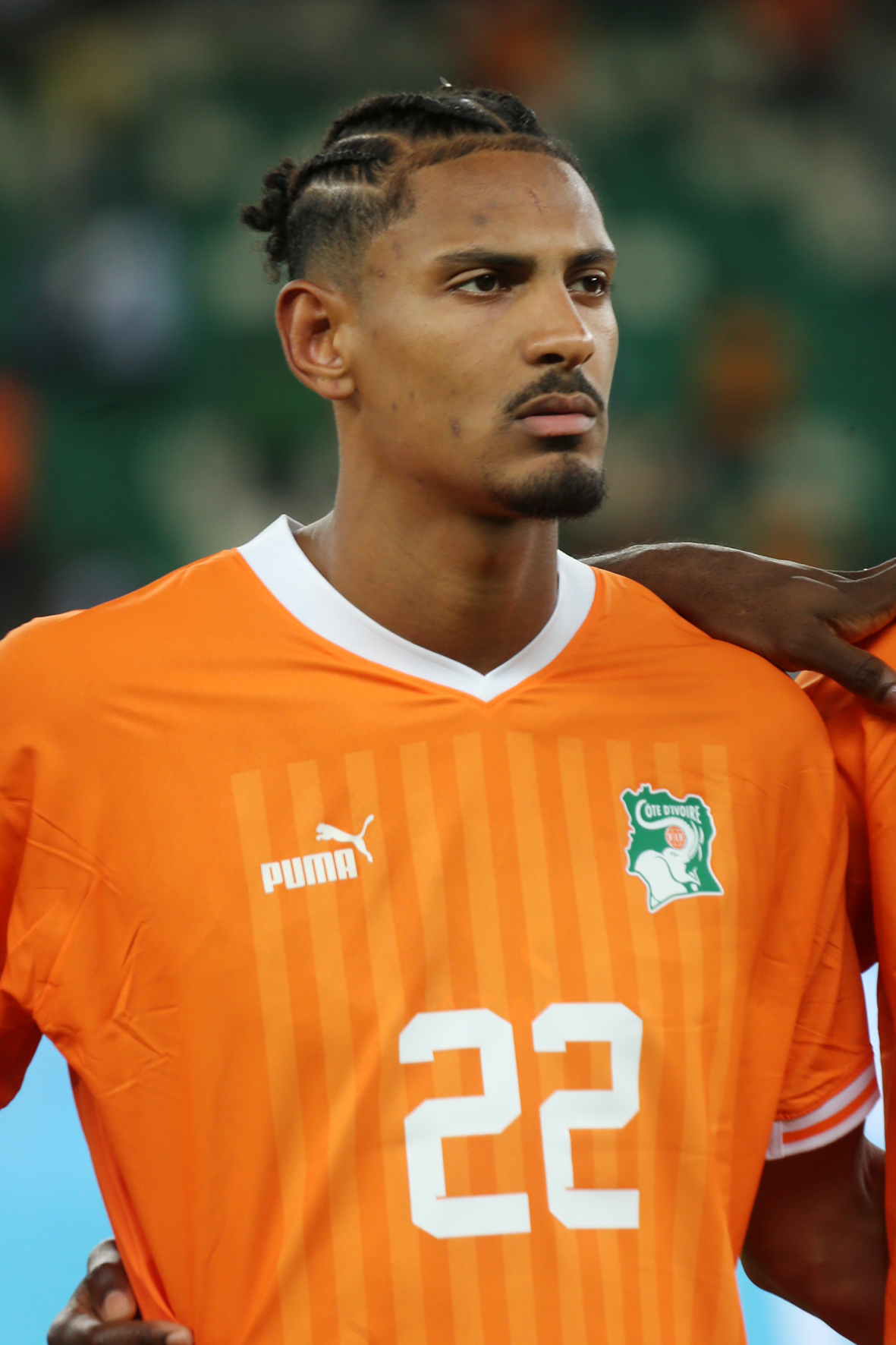
- Haller with Ivory Coast at the 2023 Africa Cup of Nations

Personal information
- Full name: Sébastien Romain Teddy Haller
- Date of birth: 22 June 1994 (age 32)
- Place of birth: Ris-Orangis, Essonne, France
- Height: 1.91 m (6 ft 3 in)
- Position: Striker

Team information
- Current team: Sanfrecce Hiroshima
- Number: 22

Youth career
- 2003–2005: FCO Vigneux
- 2005–2007: Brétigny Foot
- 2007–2010: Auxerre

Senior career*
Years	Team	Apps	(Gls)
2010–2014	Auxerre II	57	(29)
2012–2015	Auxerre	50	(6)
2015	→ Utrecht (loan)	17	(11)
2015–2017	Utrecht	65	(30)
2017–2019	Eintracht Frankfurt	60	(24)
2019–2021	West Ham United	48	(10)
2021–2022	Ajax	50	(32)
2022–2025	Borussia Dortmund	33	(9)
2024–2025	→ Leganés (loan)	8	(0)
2025	→ Utrecht (loan)	16	(4)
2025–2026	Utrecht	21	(1)
2026–	Sanfrecce Hiroshima	9	(3)

International career^{‡}
2010	France U16	1	(0)
2011	France U17	12	(6)
2011–2012	France U18	4	(1)
2012–2013	France U19	7	(3)
2013–2014	France U20	7	(2)
2013–2016	France U21	20	(13)
2020–	Ivory Coast	34	(11)
Medal record
Men's football
Representing Ivory Coast
Africa Cup of Nations
Winner	2023
- * Club domestic league appearances and goals as of 16:31, 7 November 2026 (UTC) ‡ National team caps and goals as of 23:37, 14 November 2025 (UTC)

Sébastien Romain Teddy Haller (French pronunciation: [sebastjɛ̃ alɛʁ]; born 22 June 1994) is a professional footballer who plays as a striker for J1 League club Sanfrecce Hiroshima. Born in France, he plays for the Ivory Coast national team.

Haller began his career in France with Auxerre, and moved on loan to Eredivisie side Utrecht in 2015, before signing on a permanent basis. Two years later, he moved to the German club Eintracht Frankfurt, winning the DFB-Pokal in 2018. Premier League side West Ham United signed him a year later for a club-record transfer worth €49.8 million (£45 million). Haller returned to the Netherlands in 2021, signing with Ajax, for a club record fee of €22.5 million (£18.8 million). In his first six months, he won the Eredivisie and the KNVB Cup. He became the first player to score across seven consecutive UEFA Champions League matches during the 2021–22 season, and then transferred to Borussia Dortmund for an initial €31 million.

Haller represented France at youth level, before switching his allegiance in 2020 to the Ivory Coast. He scored on his international debut against Madagascar, and represented the national team at the Africa Cup of Nations in 2021 and 2023, scoring the winning goal in the final of the latter tournament.

== Early life ==
Haller was born in Ris-Orangis, Essonne to a French father and an Ivorian mother.

== Club career ==
=== Auxerre ===
During the 2011 FIFA U-17 World Cup, on 26 June 2011, Haller signed his first professional contract with Auxerre, agreeing to a three-year deal.

Ahead of the 2012–13 season, Haller was promoted to the senior team by manager Jean-Guy Wallemme. His professional debut came on 27 July 2012, in the team's opening league match of the 2012–13 campaign against Nîmes.

=== Utrecht ===
On 24 December 2014, it was announced that Haller was sent on loan to Eredivisie club Utrecht until the end of the season. At the end of the season, it was announced that FC Utrecht had signed Haller. The supporters voted for Haller as the winner of the Di Tommaso Trophy 2015, Utrecht's player of the year award.

=== Eintracht Frankfurt ===
On 15 May 2017, Haller signed with Eintracht Frankfurt on a four-year deal for a reported fee of €7 million. In the 2017–18 DFB-Pokal, he scored four goals for Frankfurt, as the club won the final, marking the first trophy of Haller's career. In the 2018–19 Bundesliga season, he scored 15 league goals in 29 appearances as the club finished seventh. In addition to his goals scored, he also made nine assists, meaning he was involved in 24 goals, a figure only beaten in the 2018–19 season by Robert Lewandowski with 29.

=== West Ham United ===
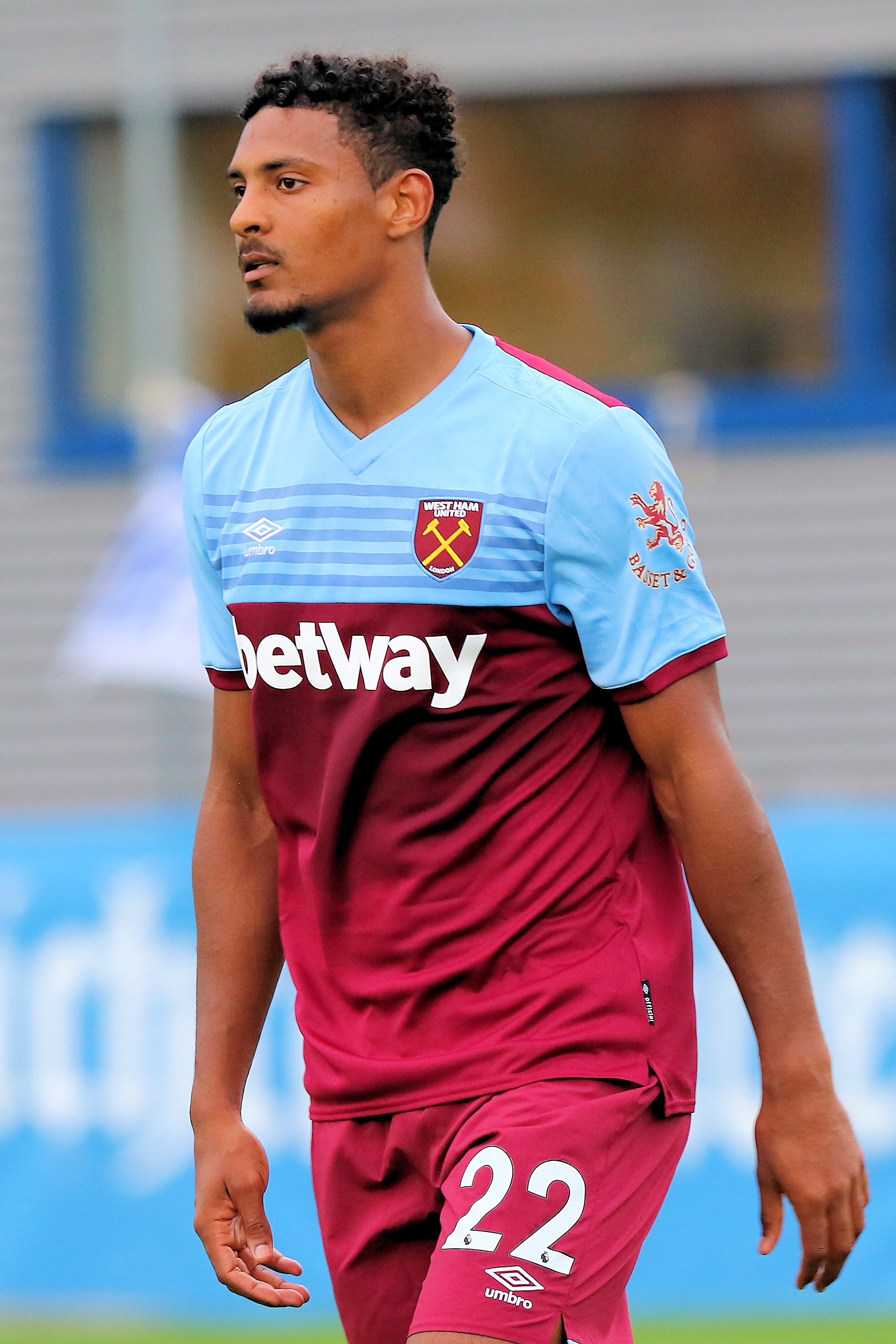
Haller playing for West Ham United in 2019

On 17 July 2019, Haller signed with West Ham United on a five-year deal for a club record fee, that could rise to £45 million. He made his debut on 10 August, playing the full 90 minutes of a 5–0 Premier League loss against reigning champions Manchester City. Two weeks later, he scored his first goals in a 3–1 away win against Watford in which the latter was an acrobatic bicycle kick. Haller struggled at West Ham, attributing it to David Moyes replacing Manuel Pellegrini as manager and then preferring Michail Antonio up front, as well as the ill health of his wife and newborn son.

In July 2020, Frankfurt reported West Ham to FIFA after they had failed to pay an instalment in May 2020 of £5.4 million as part of the £45 million transfer. West Ham claimed that they had withheld the payment, following a contractual dispute between the two clubs. On 16 December, Haller scored an overhead kick in a 1–1 draw against Crystal Palace that was voted as the Premier League Goal of the Month.

=== Ajax ===
On 8 January 2021, Haller signed a four-and-a-half-year contract with Dutch club Ajax for a club record fee of €22.5 million (£18.8 million), reuniting with his former Utrecht manager Erik ten Hag. He made his debut two days later as a second-half substitute against De Topper rivals PSV, assisting Antony for the equaliser in a 2–2 draw. On 14 January, he scored his first goal, and provided an assist, in a 3–1 away win over Twente. On 3 February, Haller was mistakenly omitted from the club's list for the knockout stages of the UEFA Europa League and therefore would be unable to play for the club in the competition.

In a 5–1 away victory over Sporting CP in the UEFA Champions League on 15 September 2021, Haller scored twice in each half to become the first player to score four on his Champions League debut since Marco van Basten for A.C. Milan in 1992; the Dutchman had however already played in the competition under its former name of the European Cup. In the following fixture 13 days later, he recorded a goal against Beşiktaş, becoming the first player in the history of the competition to score five goals in his first two match appearances; against the same team on 24 November, Haller scored twice in a 2–1 win to become the first player to score nine goals in five consecutive matches of the competition. On 7 December, Haller scored in his team's Champions League group stage match, becoming only the second player to register in all six group games after Cristiano Ronaldo in 2017–18 and became the fastest player to 10 goals in competition history. He also joined Ronaldo, Lionel Messi and Robert Lewandowski as the only players to score in the double-digits for goals in the group stage. On 23 February 2022, he made amends for an earlier own goal, and helped Ajax to a 2–2 away draw against Benfica in the last, becoming the first player to score in seven consecutive matches in the competition; his side lost 3–2 aggregate. With 21 league goals in 31 games, he finished the season as Eredivisie top scorer.

=== Borussia Dortmund ===
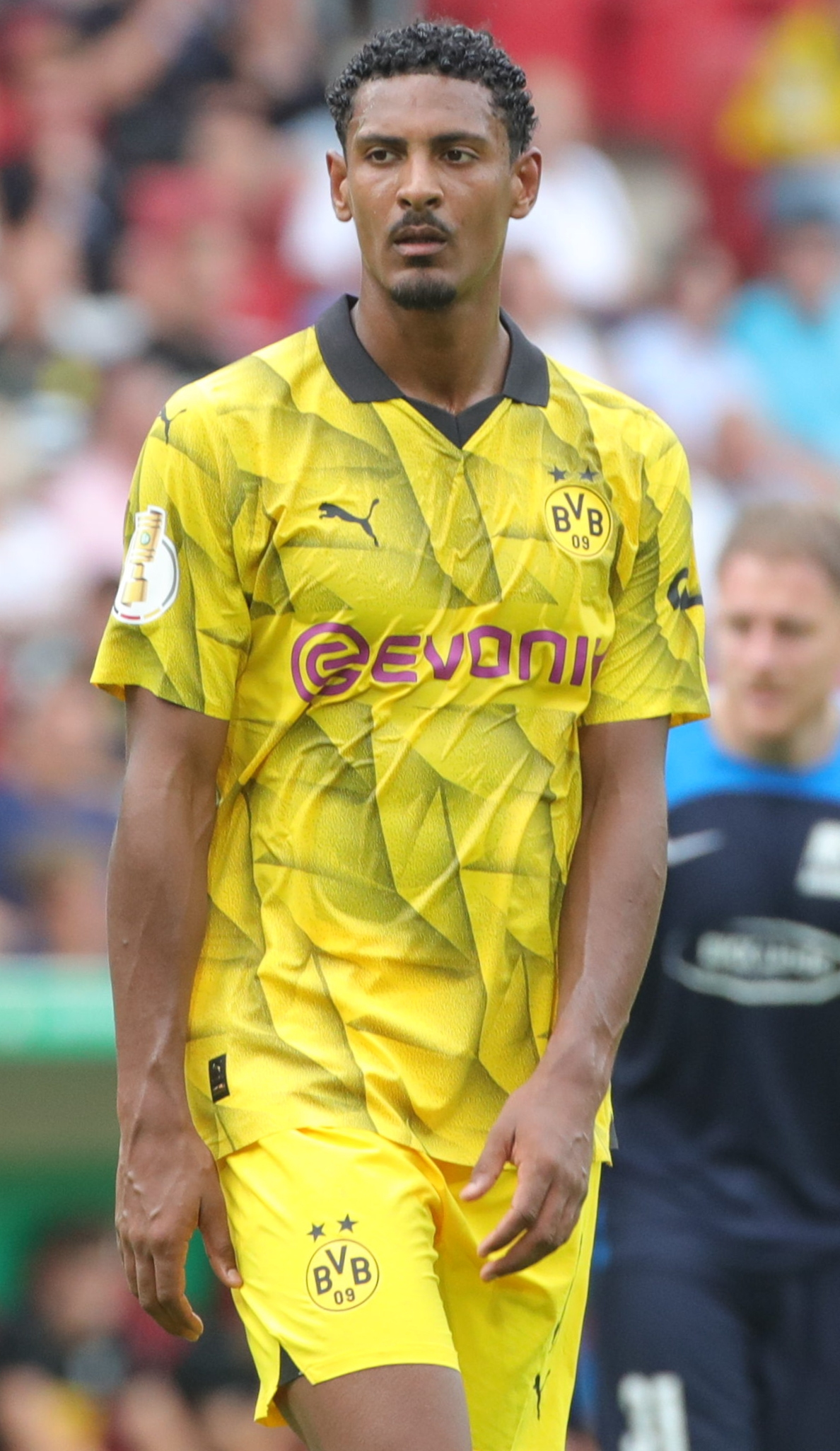
Haller playing for Borussia Dortmund in 2023

On 6 July 2022, Haller signed a contract with Borussia Dortmund until 30 June 2026. The transfer fee paid was €31 million, which could be increased to as much as €34.5 million after undisclosed bonuses. However, on 18 July, the forward withdrew from the club's pre-season training camp in Switzerland, after he was diagnosed with a malignant testicular tumour. He then underwent two surgeries and four cycles of chemotherapy in order to control the spread of the disease.

After successfully completing his treatments, in January 2023 Haller was officially allowed to return to full-time training, as he joined the rest of Dortmund's team at their winter camp in Marbella. On 10 January, he played his first match in almost eight months, featuring in the final minutes of a friendly against Fortuna Düsseldorf. Three days later, he scored a hat-trick within eight minutes in a 6–0 victory in another friendly against Basel. On 22 January, Haller came on as a second-half substitute in a 4–3 home win against Augsburg, finally making his competitive debut for Dortmund after a 6-month battle with cancer. On 4 February, he scored his first professional goal for the club in a 5–1 win against Freiburg. Haller missed a crucial penalty, when his team was trailing 1–0, during the final game of the 2022–23 Bundesliga season which ended in a 2–2 draw with Mainz. Borussia Dortmund subsequently suffered final-day heartbreak as they missed out on a first Bundesliga title for 11 years on goal difference. In 2023–24, he sustained an ankle injury which sidelined him for most of the season, in which he only scored three goals including two against TSV Schott Mainz in the DFB-Pokal and one against Atlético Madrid in the Champions League quarter-final.

==== Loan to Leganés ====
On 30 August 2024, just before the transfer window closed, Haller joined La Liga club Leganés on loan for the 2024–25 season. However, the loan move ended early during the winter transfer window.

=== Return to Utrecht ===
On 9 January 2025, Haller rejoined his former club Utrecht on loan until the end of the season. On 18 August 2025, he returned to Utrecht on a permanent basis with a one-season contract.

=== Sanfreece Hiroshima ===
On 6 June 2026, Haller signed with Sanfrecce Hiroshima of the J1 League on a free transfer. On 15 August 2026, Haller scored his first goal in the J1 League in a 4–1 win over Urawa Red Diamonds.

== International career ==
=== Youth ===
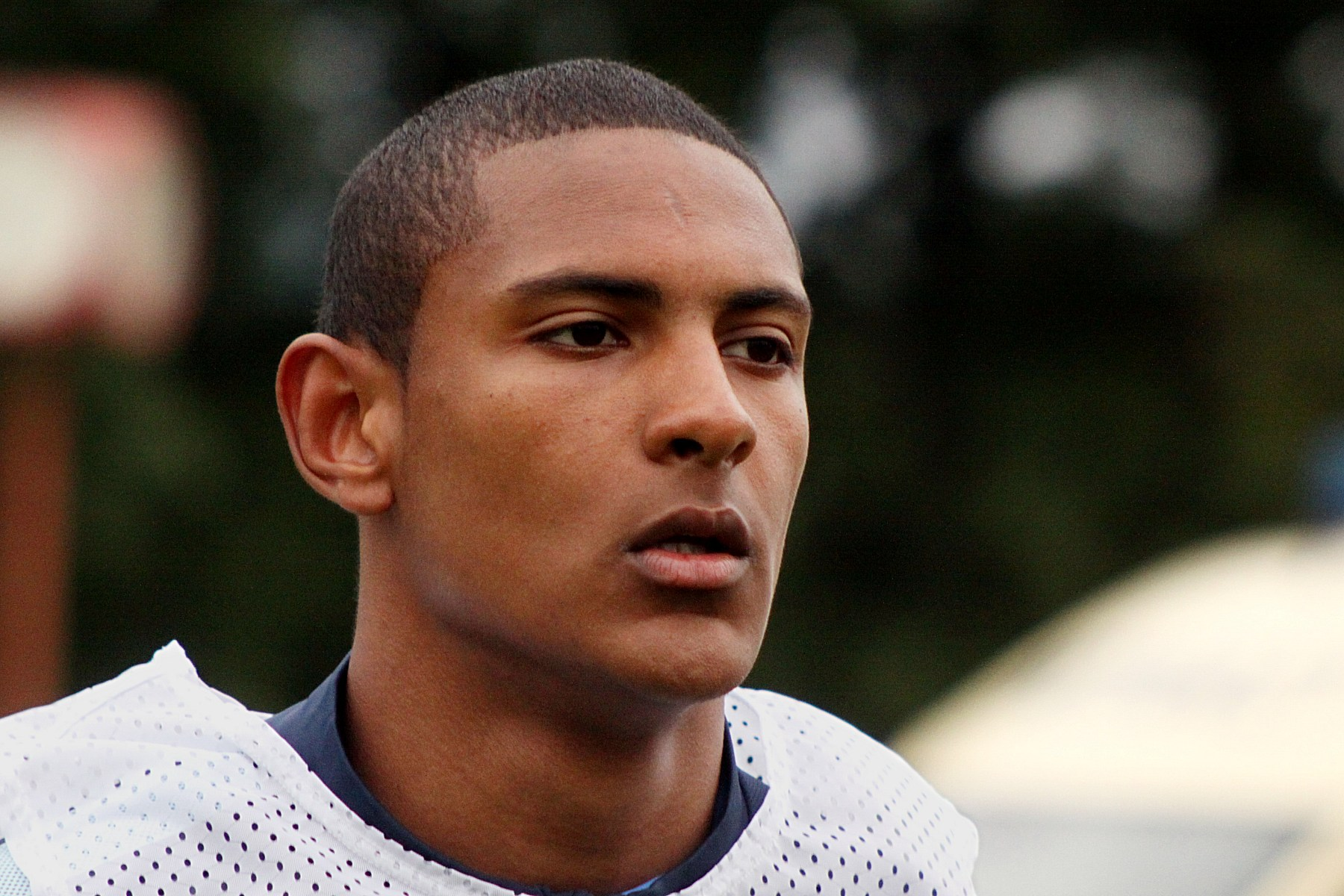
Haller with France under-19 in 2013

Haller was a France youth international, having represented his country of birth at every youth level and totalling 51 caps and 27 goals. He played with the under-17 team at the 2011 FIFA U-17 World Cup in Mexico, scoring in a 3–0 win over Argentina in the opening group game.

On 14 November 2013, Haller made his under-21 debut, coming on for Anthony Martial in the 57th minute against Armenia in a European qualifier in Toulouse and scoring to conclude a 6–0 win. He scored a hat-trick on 25 March 2015 in a friendly win of the same score against Estonia, and he did the same on 10 November 2016 in a 5–1 win over the Ivory Coast at the Stade Pierre Brisson.

=== Senior ===
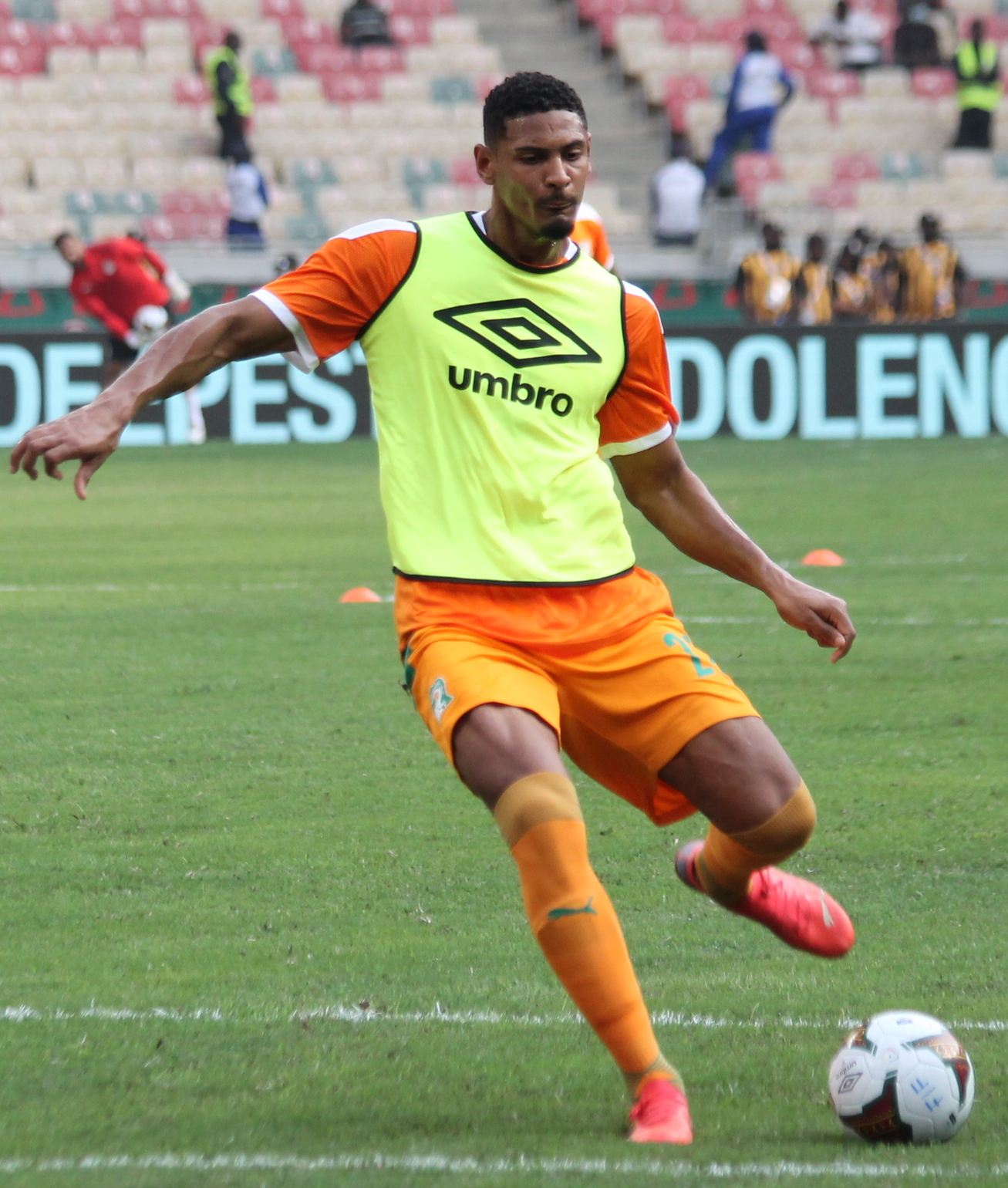
Haller playing for Ivory Coast in 2022

In November 2020, Haller was called up to the Ivory Coast national team. He debuted in a 2–1 2021 Africa Cup of Nations qualification win over Madagascar on 12 November, scoring his side's game-winning goal in the 55th minute. He was called up for the finals in Cameroon, where he scored in a 2–2 group stage draw with Sierra Leone; in the last 16 against Egypt, he was substituted at half time in extra time for Maxwel Cornet as the side lost on penalties.

In December 2023, he was named in the Ivorian squad for the 2023 Africa Cup of Nations hosted in his home nation. In the semi-final match against DR Congo, he scored the only goal in a 1–0 victory, which qualified his country to the final. He later scored the winning goal in the final match against Nigeria which ended in a 2–1 victory. However, ahead of the 2025 Africa Cup of Nations in Morocco, Haller was ruled out of the tournament due to a hamstring injury sustained on 14 December 2025 while playing for his club, and was subsequently withdrawn from the Ivory Coast squad and replaced by Evann Guessand.

== Personal life ==
In 2022 Haller was diagnosed with testicular cancer, which he overcame, returning to professional football in January 2023.

== Career statistics ==
=== Club ===
As of match played 11 October 2026

Appearances and goals by club, season and competition
Club	Season	League			National cup (Note: Includes Coupe de France, KNVB Cup, DFB-Pokal, FA Cup, Copa del Rey)		League cup (Note: Includes Coupe de la Ligue, EFL Cup, J.League Cup)		Europe		Other		Total	
Club	Season	Division	Apps	Goals	Apps	Goals	Apps	Goals	Apps	Goals	Apps	Goals	Apps	Goals
Auxerre II	2010–11	CFA	2	1	—		—		—		—		2	1
Auxerre II	2011–12	CFA	22	12	—		—		—		—		22	12
Auxerre II	2012–13	CFA	19	4	—		—		—		—		19	4
Auxerre II	2013–14	CFA 2	8	5	—		—		—		—		8	5
Auxerre II	2014–15	CFA 2	6	7	—		—		—		—		6	7
Auxerre II	Total		57	29	—		—		—		—		57	29
Auxerre	2012–13	Ligue 2	17	2	0	0	1	0	—		—		18	2
Auxerre	2013–14	Ligue 2	25	4	1	0	2	2	—		—		28	6
Auxerre	2014–15	Ligue 2	8	0	0	0	3	0	—		—		11	0
Auxerre	Total		50	6	1	0	6	2	—		—		57	8
Utrecht (loan)	2014–15	Eredivisie	17	11	—		—		—		—		17	11
Utrecht	2015–16	Eredivisie	33	17	5	5	—		—		4 (Note: Appearances in Eredivisie European play-offs)	2	42	24
Utrecht	2016–17	Eredivisie	32	13	3	1	—		—		4	2	39	16
Utrecht	Total		82	41	8	6	—		—		8	4	98	51
Eintracht Frankfurt	2017–18	Bundesliga	31	9	5	4	—		—		—		36	13
Eintracht Frankfurt	2018–19	Bundesliga	29	15	1	0	—		10 (Note: Appearances in UEFA Europa League)	5	1 (Note: Appearance in DFL-Supercup)	0	41	20
Eintracht Frankfurt	Total		60	24	6	4	—		10	5	1	0	77	33
West Ham United	2019–20	Premier League	32	7	2	0	1	0	—		—		35	7
West Ham United	2020–21	Premier League	16	3	—		3	4	—		—		19	7
West Ham United	Total		48	10	2	0	4	4	—		—		54	14
Ajax	2020–21	Eredivisie	19	11	4	2	—		—		—		23	13
Ajax	2021–22	Eredivisie	31	21	3	2	—		8 (Note: Appearances in UEFA Champions League)	11	1 (Note: Appearance in Johan Cruyff Shield)	0	43	34
Ajax	Total		50	32	7	4	—		8	11	1	0	66	47
Borussia Dortmund	2022–23	Bundesliga	19	9	1	0	—		2	0	—		22	9
Borussia Dortmund	2023–24	Bundesliga	14	0	1	2	—		4	1	—		19	3
Borussia Dortmund	Total		33	9	2	2	—		6	1	—		41	12
Leganés (loan)	2024–25	La Liga	8	0	1	0	—		—		—		9	0
Utrecht (loan)	2024–25	Eredivisie	16	4	2	2	—		—		—		18	6
Utrecht	2025–26	Eredivisie	21	1	1	0	—		9	0	2	0	33	1
Utrecht	Total		37	5	3	2	—		9	0	2	0	51	7
Sanfrecce Hiroshima	2026–27	J1 League	7	3	0	0	2	0	—		—		9	3
Career total			432	159	30	18	12	6	33	17	12	4	519	204

=== International ===
As of match played 14 November 2025

Appearances and goals by national team and year
National team	Year	Apps	Goals
Ivory Coast	2020	2	1
Ivory Coast	2021	6	2
Ivory Coast	2022	7	1
Ivory Coast	2023	6	4
Ivory Coast	2024	5	2
Ivory Coast	2025	8	1
Total		34	11

As of match played 24 March 2025.
Ivory Coast score listed first, score column indicates score after each Haller goal.

List of international goals scored by Sébastien Haller
No.	Date	Venue	Cap	Opponent	Score	Result	Competition	Ref.
1	12 November 2020	Stade National de la Côte d'Ivoire, Abidjan, Ivory Coast	1	Madagascar	2–0	2–1	2021 Africa Cup of Nations qualification	
2	6 September 2021	Stade National de la Côte d'Ivoire, Abidjan, Ivory Coast	6	Cameroon	1–0	2–1	2022 FIFA World Cup qualification	
3	6 September 2021	Stade National de la Côte d'Ivoire, Abidjan, Ivory Coast	6	Cameroon	2–0	2–1	2022 FIFA World Cup qualification	
4	16 January 2022	Japoma Stadium, Douala, Cameroon	10	Sierra Leone	1–0	2–2	2021 Africa Cup of Nations	
5	24 March 2023	Stade Bouaké, Bouaké, Ivory Coast	16	Comoros	2–0	3–1	2023 Africa Cup of Nations qualification	
6	14 October 2023	Felix Houphouet Boigny Stadium, Abidjan, Ivory Coast	19	Morocco	1–0	1–1	2023 Africa Cup of Nations qualification	
7	17 October 2023	Felix Houphouet Boigny Stadium, Abidjan, Ivory Coast	20	South Africa	1–1	1–1	2023 Africa Cup of Nations qualification	
8	17 November 2023	Stade National de la Côte d'Ivoire, Abidjan, Ivory Coast	21	Seychelles	1–0	9–0	2026 FIFA World Cup qualification	
9	7 February 2024	Alassane Ouattara Stadium, Abidjan, Ivory Coast	24	DR Congo	1–0	1–0	2023 Africa Cup of Nations	
10	11 February 2024	Alassane Ouattara Stadium, Abidjan, Ivory Coast	25	Nigeria	2–1	2–1	2023 Africa Cup of Nations final	
11	24 March 2025	Felix Houphouet Boigny Stadium, Abidjan, Ivory Coast	29	Gambia	1–0	1–0	2026 FIFA World Cup qualification	

== Honours ==
Eintracht Frankfurt

- DFB-Pokal: 2017–18

Ajax

- Eredivisie: 2020–21, 2021–22
- KNVB Cup: 2020–21

Ivory Coast

- Africa Cup of Nations: 2023

Individual

- David Di Tommaso Trophy: 2015
- Bundesliga Rookie of the Month: October 2017
- Premier League Goal of the Month: December 2020
- Eredivisie Top Scorer: 2021–22
- Eredivisie Team of the Month: April 2025
