= Yassin Ayoub =

Dutch footballer (born 1994)

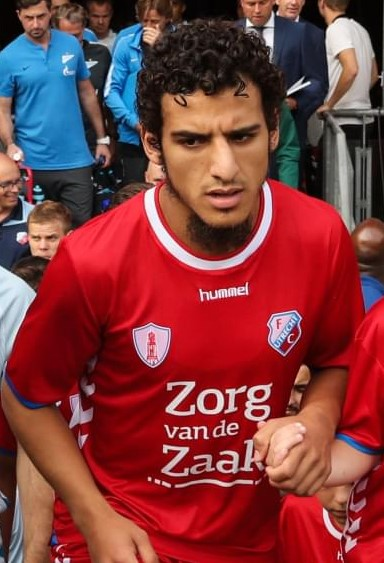
- Ayoub in 2017

Personal information
- Date of birth: 6 March 1994 (age 32)
- Place of birth: Al Hoceima, Morocco
- Height: 1.74 m (5 ft 9 in)
- Position: Midfielder

Youth career
- ASV De Dijk
- Haarlem
- –2008: Ajax
- 2008–2013: Utrecht

Senior career*
Years	Team	Apps	(Gls)
2012–2018	Utrecht	146	(19)
2018–2020	Feyenoord	19	(2)
2020–2022	Panathinaikos	16	(0)
2022–2023	Excelsior	15	(0)
Total		196	(21)

International career
2010–2011	Netherlands U17	12	(2)
2011–2012	Netherlands U18	2	(1)
2013	Netherlands U19	7	(0)
2013–2015	Netherlands U21	4	(0)
Medal record
Men's football
Representing Netherlands
UEFA European Under-17 Championship
Winner	2011 Serbia
- * Club domestic league appearances and goals as of 10:45, 12 July 2024 (UTC)

Yassin Ayoub (Arabic: ياسين ايوب; born 6 March 1994) is a retired footballer who played as a midfielder. Born in Morocco, he represented the Netherlands at youth level.

== Club career ==
In January 2018, Ayoub signed a contract until 2022 with Feyenoord, effective 1 July 2018.

On 22 January 2020, he signed a contract with Panathinaikos, running until the summer of 2023.

On 22 July 2022, Ayoub signed a two-year contract with Excelsior. He soon ran into a conflict with manager Marinus Dijkhuizen and was forbidden to train with the first team squad.

As of January 2025, Ayoub was maintaining his fitness at Moroccan club Ittihad Tanger.

== International career ==
Ayoub won the 2011 UEFA European Under-17 Championship with Netherlands U-17 after being diagnosed with heart problems.

== Career statistics ==
As of match played 16 May 2021

Appearances and goals by club, season and competition
Club	Season	League			Cup		Continental		Other		Total	
Club	Season	Division	Apps	Goals	Apps	Goals	Apps	Goals	Apps	Goals	Apps	Goals
Utrecht	2012–13	Eredivisie	2	0	—		—		1 (Note: Appearances in the Eredivisie Play-offs)	0	3	0
Utrecht	2013–14	Eredivisie	26	3	3	0	—		—		29	3
Utrecht	2014–15	Eredivisie	31	5	1	0	—		—		32	5
Utrecht	2015–16	Eredivisie	24	1	3	1	—		—		27	2
Utrecht	2016–17	Eredivisie	32	4	4	0	—		4	1	40	5
Utrecht	2017–18	Eredivisie	31	6	2	1	5 (Note: Appearances in the Europa League qualifiers)	0	3	0	41	8
Utrecht	Total		146	19	13	2	5	0	8	1	172	22
Feyenoord	2018–19	Eredivisie	16	2	2	0	0	0	—		18	2
Feyenoord	2019–20	Eredivisie	3	0	0	0	2	0	—		5	0
Feyenoord	Total		19	2	2	0	2	0	—		23	2
Panathinaikos	2019–20	Super LeagueGreece	6	0	1	0	—		—		7	0
Panathinaikos	2020–21	Super LeagueGreece	9	0	0	0	—		—		9	0
Panathinaikos	Total		15	0	1	0	—		—		16	0
Career total			179	21	16	2	7	0	8	1	210	24

== Honours ==
Feyenoord

- Johan Cruijff Shield: 2018

Panathinaikos

- Greek Cup: 2021–22
