= Everon Pisas =

Curaçaoan footballer

Personal information
- Full name: Everon Romario Elvis Pisas
- Date of birth: 13 October 1994 (age 32)
- Place of birth: Willemstad, Curaçao
- Height: 1.83 m (6 ft 0 in)
- Position: Winger

Youth career
- ZVV Pelikaan
- Dordrecht

Senior career*
Years	Team	Apps	(Gls)
2013–2016	Dordrecht	50	(2)
2016	Poli Timișoara	3	(0)
2016–2017	Dordrecht	22	(2)
2018	Kozakken Boys	1	(1)
2018–2020	IFC	22	(9)
2020–2022	Unitas	38	(11)
2022–2023	SteDoCo	29	(2)
2023–2024	SC Feyenoord		
2024–	IFC		
- * Club domestic league appearances and goals as of 15 January 2026

Everon Romario Elvis Pisas (born 13 October 1994) is a Curaçaoan professional footballer who plays as a winger.
