= Ruud Boymans =

Dutch footballer (born 1989)

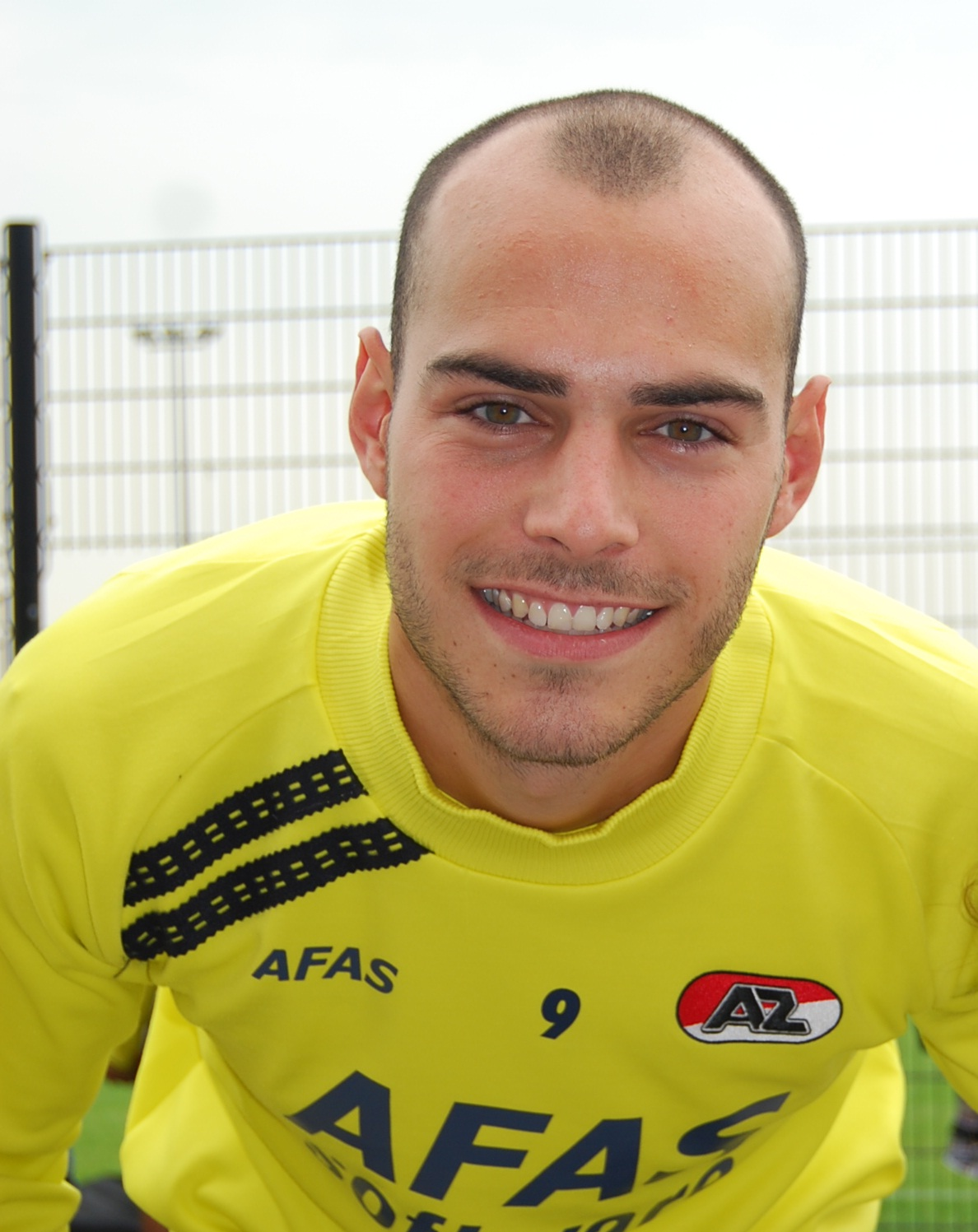
- Boymans with AZ Alkmaar

Personal information
- Date of birth: 28 April 1989 (age 37)
- Place of birth: Born, Netherlands
- Height: 1.88 m (6 ft 2 in)
- Position: Forward

Youth career
- VV Born
- Fortuna Sittard

Senior career*
Years	Team	Apps	(Gls)
2007–2009	Fortuna Sittard	46	(12)
2009–2011	VVV-Venlo	46	(15)
2011–2014	AZ	11	(1)
2013	→ NEC (loan)	7	(3)
2013–2014	→ Willem II (loan)	36	(27)
2014–2016	FC Utrecht	24	(19)
2016–2017	Al Shabab	7	(2)
2020	Almere City	2	(0)
Total		179	(79)
- * Club domestic league appearances and goals

Ruud Boymans (born 28 April 1989) is a Dutch former professional footballer. He played as a forward for Fortuna Sittard, VVV-Venlo, AZ, Willem II, FC Utrecht, Al Shabab and Almere City FC.

== Career ==
Boymans was born in Born, Netherlands. He made his debut in professional football on 7 December 2007, playing for Fortuna Sittard against RBC Roosendaal in a match that ended 0–0. In December 2008, Boymans signed a three-year deal with VVV-Venlo, which would start after finishing the season with Fortuna Sittard. Boymans impressed with VVV and scored 15 goals in 46 matches for the club.

On 27 June 2011, AZ confirmed they had signed Boymans to a four-year deal. Unfortunately, Boymans was not able to cement his place in the first eleven and was sent on loan to NEC on 27 January 2013. For the 2013–14 season, Boymans was sent on loan to Willem II. He became champion of the Eerste Divisie and scored 27 times in 36 matches.

As he had no prospect of play time with AZ, Boymans was sold to FC Utrecht on 17 June 2014. He signed a four-year deal with the Eredivisie side.

On 6 June 2016, it was announced Boymans had signed with Al Shabab. He scored twice in his first six league matches. In November 2016, in a match against Dibba Al-Fujairah Club, he swallowed his tongue after colliding with the opponent goalkeeper. Scans at the hospital found moisture in his head which kept Boymans out of action. After a run of poor results, Dutch coach Fred Rutten resigned. In the 2016–17 summer transfer window, Al Shabab signed an African forward who was registered as one of four foreigners allowed per club while Boymans was the fifth foreigner and unable to play. In June 2017, he trained with former club FC Utrecht.

After playing six months for Almere City FC, and later training with Quick Boys, Boymans announced that he had decided to retire in August 2020 after suffering a serious injury.

== Personal life ==
After retiring, Boymans became co-founder of international lifestyle brand No Art.

== Honours ==
Willem II

- Eerste Divisie: 2013–14
