= Leon de Kogel =

Dutch footballer (born 1991)

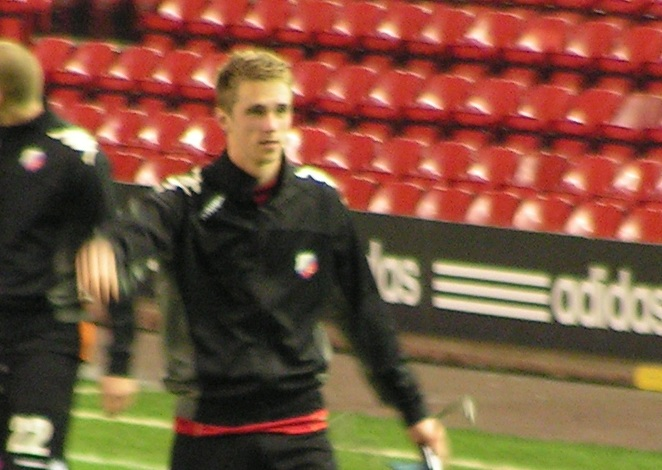
- De Kogel with Utrecht in 2010

Personal information
- Date of birth: 13 November 1991 (age 34)
- Place of birth: Alphen aan den Rijn, Netherlands
- Height: 1.94 m (6 ft 4 in)
- Position: Forward

Team information
- Current team: SV Houten (youth coach)

Youth career
- Utrecht

Senior career*
Years	Team	Apps	(Gls)
2010–2015	Utrecht	38	(8)
2013–2014	→ VVV-Venlo (loan)	29	(14)
2014–2015	→ Almere City (loan)	18	(2)
2015–2018	Go Ahead Eagles	68	(27)
2018	Cornellà	13	(2)
Total		168	(53)
- * Club domestic league appearances and goals

Leon de Kogel (born 13 November 1991) is a Dutch football coach and former professional player.

== Early and personal life ==
De Kogel was born in Alphen aan den Rijn. By December 2018 he had two young children.

== Career ==
De Kogel began his career with the youth team of FC Utrecht. He played senior football as a forward for FC Utrecht, VVV-Venlo, Almere City, Go Ahead Eagles and Cornellà, scoring 53 goals in 168 league appearances.

De Kogel's career ended following a serious car accident in Salini, Malta, on 11 June 2018. He was visiting the island on holiday with friends. De Kogel had to be cut out of the car he was travelling in by the fire service. He underwent hours of surgery, and doctors doubted that he would ever walk again, let alone play football. Four days after the accident his former club FC Utrecht paid for de Kogel to be flown back to the Netherlands, where he spent a further six weeks in hospital. Doctors suggested a prosthetic knee, although de Kogel was opposed to that.

Following the accident his Spanish club Cornellà stopped paying his salary, and the insurance company of the taxi driver responsible for the accident did not make a payout. Settlement was reached with Cornellà in December 2018 following the intervention of both the Dutch and Spanish players' associations. However, de Kogel was still involved in legal proceedings related to the accident in March 2019.

Six months after the accident, de Kogel was still undergoing rehabilitation at a military centre in Doorn, from Monday to Friday every week. In December 2018 he was considering his future, whether in or outside of football. Later that month he returned to football as a youth coach at SV Houten. Eight months after the accident de Kogel was still walking with crutches.

Due to his financial difficulties, a FC Utrecht fan started a collection for de Kogel. There were donations from fans of numerous clubs, the sale of shirts and pennants, and a charity match between Jong FC Utrecht and Go Ahead Eagles, which de Kogel symbolically 'kicked off'. The total raised was just under €24,000, from donations, sales, and match proceeds. Professional footballer Hakim Ziyech later contributed.
