= Anouar Kali =

Moroccan football player (born 1991)

Personal information
- Date of birth: 3 June 1991 (age 35)
- Place of birth: Utrecht, Netherlands
- Height: 1.72 m (5 ft 8 in)
- Position: Defensive midfielder

Youth career
- DOS
- Ajax
- Elinkwijk
- FC Utrecht

Senior career*
| Years | Team | Apps | (Gls) |
| 2010–2013 | FC Utrecht | 52 | (2) |
| 2013–2014 | Roda JC Kerkrade | 29 | (1) |
| 2014–2015 | FC Utrecht | 13 | (0) |
| 2015 | Al-Arabi | 0 | (0) |
| 2015 | → Mesaimeet (loan) | | |
| 2016–2017 | Willem II | 30 | (0) |
| 2017–2018 | FC Utrecht | 8 | (0) |
| 2018 | Jong FC Utrecht | 5 | (0) |
| 2018–2021 | NAC Breda | 23 | (0) |
| 2019 | → Excelsior Virton (loan) | 0 | (0) |

International career^{‡}
| 2011–2012 | Morocco U23 | 4 | (0) |
- * Club domestic league appearances and goals as of 28 July 2018 ‡ National team caps and goals as of 23 May 2021

Anouar Kali (born 3 June 1991) is a football player who plays as a defensive midfielder. Born in the Netherlands, he represented Morocco at under-23 international level.

== Career ==
=== FC Utrecht ===
Growing up in Utrecht, Netherlands, Kali was friends with Rodney Sneijder, brother of Jeffrey Sneijder and Wesley Sneijder, and played street football before playing in various youth clubs, such as DOS, Ajax and Elinkwijk. But it was FC Utrecht helped Kali start his professional career. At some of his FC Utrecht, he signed a contract with the club.

Kali made his Utrecht debut on 24 April 2011, coming on as a substitute for Nana Akwasi Asare in the 84th minute, in a 4–2 win against Vitesse Arnhem. Kali went on to make two appearances in total at the end of the 2010–11 season.

In his second full season, Kali played his first match of the 2011–12 season, coming on as a substitute for Rodney Sneijder in the 85th minute, in a 3–1 win over Roda JC on 27 August 2011. Kali then scored his first professional career, in a 6–4 win over Ajax on 6 November 2011 after sixteen minutes coming on as a substitute. He became a first team regular for the side. For his performance, Kali was voted the club's talent of the year. Although he spent most of the season on the substitute bench and suffered ankle injury at some point in April 2012, Kali went on to make 23 appearances and scoring once in all competition for the club.

His third season proved to be a breakthrough for Kali, as he started in the first team regularly. However at the start of the season, Kali was sent-off after a second bookable offense despite a good performance made, in a 1–0 win over PSV on 16 September 2012. At the beginning of October, the club negotiated a new contract for Kali. The following month, Voetbal International reported that Kali signed a contract, keeping him until 2016. However, he turned down a new contract with the club. As a result of turning down a contract extension, Kali was linked a move away from FC Utrecht, which other European clubs were interested. Amid the transfer speculation, Kali then scored his first goal of the season, in a 3–1 win over Willem II on 27 January 2013. Kali then earned his fifth yellow card of the season against PSV on 16 February 2013, giving him a one match suspension. Two months later, Kali was sent-off for the second time this season after another second bookable offense, in a 6–0 defeat to AZ on 14 April 2013. Coincidentally, Kali became the 1500th player to receive a red card in the league's history. He helped his side to 5th-place finish in the league table, qualifying for the UEFA Europa League through the Eredivisie Playoff rounds, where they beat SC Heerenveen 3–1 on aggregate, and FC Twente 3–2 on aggregate, thus qualifying for the UEFA Europa League qualifying rounds. At the end of the 2012–13 season, having made thirty appearances and scoring once in all competition, Kali left the club in the summer of 2013 on a free transfer to join a stronger team.

=== Roda JC ===
Surprisingly, Kali signed a three-year contract with Roda JC on 27 June 2013.

Kali made his Roda JC debut, in the opening game of the season, in a 3–0 loss against Ajax. Since joining the club, he quickly established himself in the starting eleven, playing in the defensive midfield position. Kali captained the side for the first time, starting the match and helped the side draw 1–1 against SC Heerenveen on 18 January 2014. He then captained the side in a number of occasion. He then scored his first goal for the club, from a penalty spot, in a 2–1 loss against Feyenoord on 4 February 2014. Despite being sidelined during the 2013–14 season, due to injury and suspension, Kali finished his first season at the club, making thirty–three appearances and scoring once in all competitions.

Following Roda JC relegation, Kali's future became uncertain over the surroundings of his contract.

=== FC Utrecht ===
After the relegation of Roda, Kali returned to his former team FC Utrecht on 25 June 2014 on a free transfer following activation of his release clause if Roda JC were to be relegated. Upon joining the club, he was given a number six shirt for his return ahead of the new season.

Kali made his FC Utrecht return in the opening game of the season, in a 2–0 loss against PEC Zwolle. Since joining the club, he quickly regained his first team place for the side. However, his second spell at Utrecht wasn't the same after he tore his hamstring during a match against PSV on 26 October 2014. It wasn't until 18 January 2015 when he returned from injury, starting the match before being substituted, in a 2–1 loss against SC Heerenveen. However, at the end of January, his return at Utrecht was short–lived when he punched his teammate, Kristoffer Peterson, in the face during a training session sidelining Peterson for 6 weeks with a broken jaw. Kali was first only punished with a fine and even played the following weekend. However, on Monday the club eventually suspended Kali for 6 weeks. Peterson later stated he has forgiven Kali for punching him in the face.

=== Al-Arabi ===
On 13 February 2015, it was announced that Kali had been sold to Qatari side Al-Arabi, signing a four–year contract. His departure had left many players at Utrecht surprised.

However, he made one appearance at Al-Arabi. Soon after, Kali was told by the club that he's free to leave the club, citing too many foreigners. After six months at the club, Kali returned to Netherlands, having not received a salary for more than three months. However, he sought help from the Netherlands embassy after the club refused to give him an exit visa.

=== Willem II ===
After leaving Al-Arabi, he went on a trial with Slovakian side Slovan Bratislava. He then went on trial with De Graafschap and at one point, the club wanted to sign Kali, but the agreement couldn't made, due to reimbursement from his former club, FC Utrecht. He even joined the club's training camp in January 2016. In mid-February 2016, Willem II signed Kali until the end of the 2015–16 season.

He made his debut for Willem II on 21 February 2016, coming on as a substitute in the 71st minute, in 2–1 loss in an away game against FC Utrecht. However, Kali suffered a leg injury that saw him sidelined for months. It wasn't until 8 May 2016 when he returned from injury, in a 3–2 win over Roda JC. He helped his side to avoid relegation after beating Almere City 6–3 on aggregate and NAC Breda 4–3 on aggregate. At the end of the 2015–16 season, having made six appearances for the side, it was announced that Kali signed a contract with the club, keeping him until 2018.

At the start of the 2016–17 season, however, Kali suffered a leg injury during the club's pre–season and was sidelined for months. It wasn't until 27 August 2016 when he made his return from injury, coming on as a late substitute, in a 0–0 draw against Roda JC. In a 5–0 against Ajax in the KNVB Beker on 21 September 2016, Kali became the first man to be sent–off through video technology after being penalised for a foul on Lasse Schöne, which he was initially given a yellow card before being given a red card. As a result, Kali was given a three match suspension. After serving three match ban, Kali returned to the first team, where he regained his place in the starting eleven. His performance against SC Heerenveen on 16 December 2016 earned him praise from Voetbal International. His performance also attracted interests from European clubs, but Kali announced his intention to stay at the club instead. At the end of the 2016–17 season, he went on to make twenty–nine appearances in all competitions.

=== Return to FC Utrecht ===
It was announced on 31 July 2017 that Kali joined FC Utrecht for the third time, signing a two–year contract and Willem II received an undisclosed fee.

Kali made his third debut for FC Utrecht in the opening game of the season, where he started the match, but suffered a tackle from Danny Bakker, injuring his Achilles tendon and had to be substituted, as FC Utrecht won 3–0 against ADO Den Haag. As a result, it was announced that Kali would be out for two months, which eventually out for the rest of the year. It wasn't until 9 February 2018 when he returned from injury, starting the match for the reserve side, in a 5–2 win over RKC Waalwijk. He didn't make his first team return from injury on 25 February 2018, coming on as a late substitute, in a 3–1 win over FC Twente. Kali spent the rest of the 2017–18 season, coming on as a substitute for the rest of the matches. At the end of the 2017–18 season, he went on to make eleven appearances for the side.

=== NAC Breda ===
It was reported on 4 August 2018 that Kali joined NAC Breda on a three–year contract.

Kali made his NAC Breda debut in the opening game of the season, starting the whole game, in a 5–0 loss against AZ Alkmaar. Since joining the club, Kali found himself competing in a midfield position with Gianluca Nijholt and Arno Verschueren. Following the club's back to back defeats between 25 August 2018 and 5 October 2018, he said: "What we have shown on behalf of the NAC club is outrageous. What worries me most is that every ball that comes into our 16s is dangerous. We are not a unit, not a team." During a 2–1 win over Heracles Almelo on 3 November 2018, Kali fouled his former teammate, Kristoffer Peterson, who played for Heracles Almelo at the time, and was not given a red card; which after the match, he said it was not intentional. Shortly after, however, Kali was sidelined for several months. He then made his return to the first team, starting the whole game, in a 3–0 loss against De Graafschap on 1 February 2019. His return was short–lived, as he was sent to the substitute bench throughout February and beginning of March. But he was then recalled to the starting eleven for the rest of the season, as the club, however, unsuccessfully fought for relegation to stay in the league. At the end of the 2018–19 season, Kali went on to make twenty–two appearances in all competitions.

Ahead of the 2019–20 season, Kali was told by NAC Breda that he can leave the club after he's no longer in the first team plan under the management of Ruud Brood.

Following his stint at NAC Breda, Anouar Kali officially retired from professional football on 1 July 2021.

== International career ==
Kali was born in the Netherlands to parents of Moroccan descent, and has represented the Morocco national under-23 football team.
