= Josimar Lima =

Cape Verdean footballer

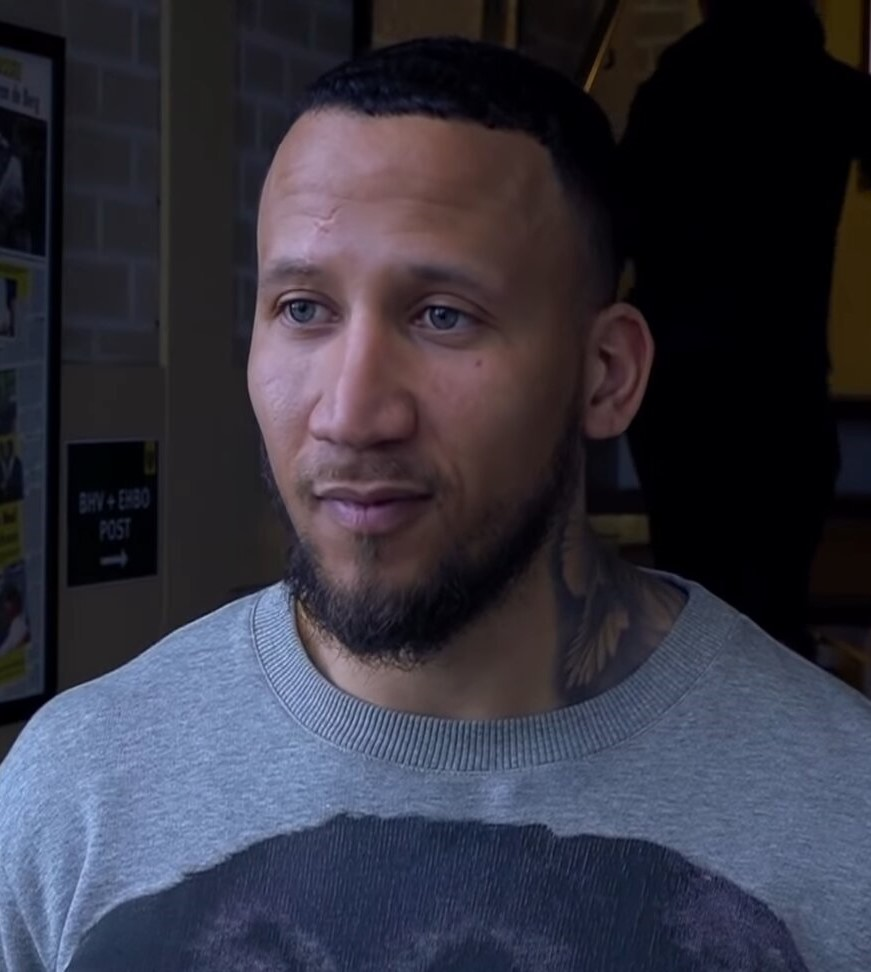
- Lima in 2019

Personal information
- Full name: Josimar Do Sameiro Spencer Silva Lima
- Date of birth: 2 August 1989 (age 37)
- Place of birth: São Vicente, Cape Verde
- Height: 1.90 m (6 ft 3 in)
- Position: Centre-back

Team information
- Current team: CION

Youth career
- Excelsior
- Willem II

Senior career*
Years	Team	Apps	(Gls)
2009–2011	Willem II	3	(0)
2011–2014	Dordrecht	67	(7)
2014	Al-Shaab	11	(0)
2014–2016	Dordrecht	35	(2)
2016–2018	Emmen	35	(1)
2018	Lahti	9	(0)
2019	VVV-Venlo	2	(0)
2019–2020	ASWH	13	(1)
2020–2022	Deltasport		
2022–	CION		

International career
2007–2008	Netherlands U19	5	(0)
2010–2014	Cape Verde	5	(0)
- * Club domestic league appearances and goals as of 07:07, 31 December 2022 (UTC)

Josimar Do Sameiro Spencer Silva Lima (born 2 August 1989) is a Cape Verdean professional footballer who played as a centre-back. He formerly played for Willem II, FC Dordrecht, Al-Shaab, Emmen, Lahti, and VVV-Venlo. He currently plays for CION.
