= Soufian Moro =

Dutch footballer (born 1993)

Personal information
- Date of birth: 21 February 1993 (age 33)
- Place of birth: Amsterdam, Netherlands
- Height: 1.74 m (5 ft 9 in)
- Position: Winger

Youth career
- ASV De Germaan
- Blauw-Wit
- Volendam
- Utrecht

Senior career*
| Years | Team | Apps | (Gls) |
| 2012–2014 | Utrecht | 1 | (0) |
| 2014–2015 | PEC Zwolle | 9 | (1) |
| 2015–2016 | Fortuna Sittard | 9 | (0) |
| 2017–2019 | IJsselmeervogels | 37 | (6) |
| 2019 | → DVS '33 (loan) | 17 | (6) |
| 2019–2020 | DVS '33 | 34 | (9) |
| 2020–2024 | DHSC | | |
| 2024–2025 | Nieuw Utrecht | | |
- * Club domestic league appearances and goals

Soufian Moro (born 21 February 1993) is a Dutch footballer who plays as a winger. He formerly played for FC Utrecht, PEC Zwolle and Fortuna Sittard.

== Career ==
On 2 January 2019, DVS '33 announced that they had signed Moro on loan for the rest of the season from IJsselmeervogels. He joined the club permanently at the loan spell ended.

In February 2020, it was announced that he would move to Hoofdklasse club DHSC from the beginning of the next season.
