= Danny Verbeek =

Dutch footballer (born 1990)

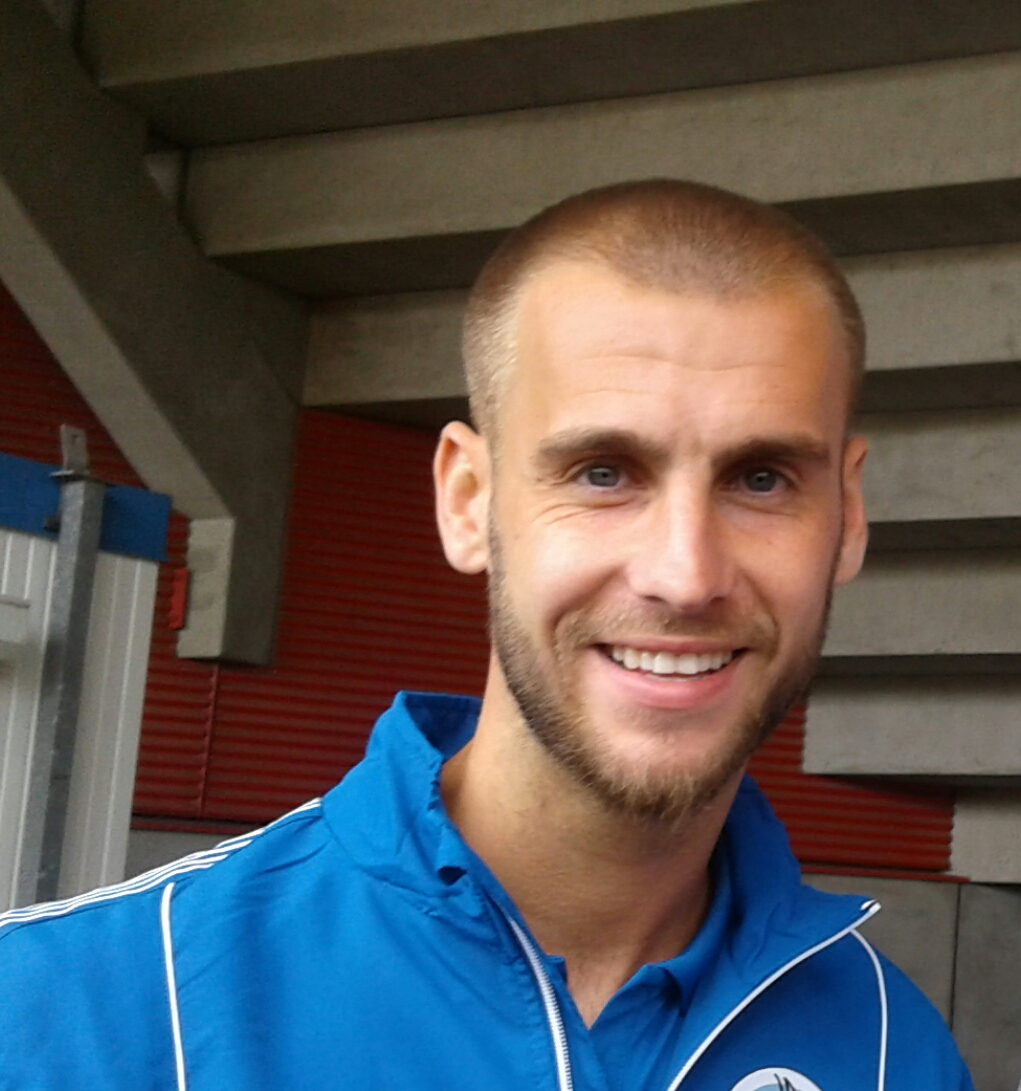
- Verbeek in 2017

Personal information
- Date of birth: 15 August 1990 (age 36)
- Place of birth: 's-Hertogenbosch, Netherlands
- Height: 1.83 m (6 ft 0 in)
- Position: Attacking midfielder

Youth career
- BVV Den Bosch
- Den Bosch

Senior career*
Years	Team	Apps	(Gls)
2009–2012	Den Bosch	88	(19)
2012–2015	Standard Liège	0	(0)
2012–2014	→ NAC Breda (loan)	53	(9)
2014–2015	→ Utrecht (loan)	13	(2)
2015–2017	NAC Breda	48	(2)
2017–2020	Den Bosch	73	(11)
2020–2022	De Graafschap	50	(1)
2022–2026	Den Bosch	77	(5)
- * Club domestic league appearances and goals

Danny Verbeek (born 15 August 1990) is a Dutch former professional footballer who played as an attacking midfielder. He played for De Graafschap, Standard Liège, NAC Breda and Den Bosch.

== Career ==
Verbeek was born in Den Bosch, and started his career with FC Den Bosch for whom he played 88 matches. In the summer of 2012 he was signed by Standard Liège. On 16 August 2012, Verbeek was sent on loan to NAC Breda after it became clear that his chances of playing in the Standard first team were limited. He would stay two seasons for the club. On 17 June 2014, Verbeek was sent on loan again, this time to FC Utrecht.

On 2 June 2022, Verbeek returned to Den Bosch on a two-year contract. He retired from playing in the summer of 2026.
