= Christian Kum =

Dutch footballer

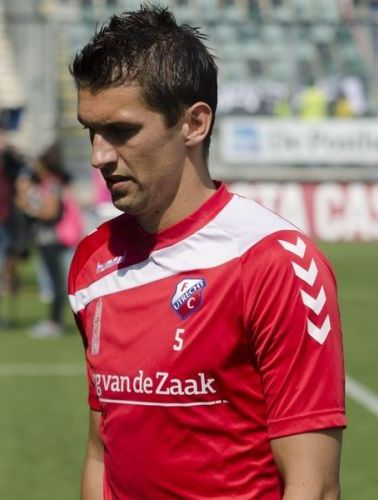

Personal information
- Date of birth: 13 September 1985 (age 41)
- Place of birth: Frankfurt, West Germany
- Height: 1.83 m (6 ft 0 in)
- Positions: Centre back; left back

Youth career
- DSO
- Feyenoord
- Haaglandia
- ADO Den Haag

Senior career*
Years	Team	Apps	(Gls)
2005–2012	ADO Den Haag	144	(3)
2012–2014	Heerenveen	41	(0)
2014–2016	Utrecht	51	(5)
2016–2018	Roda	50	(5)
2018–2021	VVV-Venlo	68	(0)
Total		354	(13)
- * Club domestic league appearances and goals as of 8 May 2021

Christian Kum (Dutch pronunciation: [ˈkrɪstɕɑŋ ˈkʏm]; (Note: In isolation, Christian is pronounced [ˈkrɪstɕɑn].) born 13 September 1985) is a Dutch former professional footballer. He formerly played eight years for ADO Den Haag and two seasons for SC Heerenveen.

== Club career ==
Kum was born in Frankfurt, West Germany, but moved to the Netherlands when he was a year-and-a-half old. He is the son of a German father and Dutch mother. Kum began playing football for DSO from Zoetermeer and was scouted by Feyenoord and was signed. However, the club released him and he eventually moved to amateur club RVC Rijswijk where he was spotted by Eredivisie club ADO Den Haag where he entered the youth academy. Kum has Dutch and German citizenship.

=== ADO Den Haag ===
In the second half of the 2005–06 season, Kum replaced the injured Spira Grujić and made his debut for the club in a 2–0 loss against PSV Eindhoven on 29 January 2012 when he received a yellow card and played 90 minutes. Kum made 2 more appearances this season. Over the next two seasons, Kum developed into the starting line-up in the ADO Den Haag-defense, playing in central defense. During his early career, the club was relegated to Jupiler League, only to be promoted again the following season through playoffs, after the club finished 6th in the league. Following promotion, Kum ended speculation that he would leave the club as his expired at the end of the season signing a new contract until 2012. On 15 March 2009, Kum scored his first goal in a 3–0 win over N.E.C. and scored again in his next game in a 4–1 loss against AZ on 4 April 2009. The next season, Kum scored his first of the season in a 1–1 draw against Vitesse Arnhem on 6 March 2010. In a match between ADO Den Haag and NEC on 14 April 2010, Kum scored an own goal after John Goossens free kick to make it 2–2 and NEC went on to win 3–2. After two season with ADO at the league under manager John van den Brom, his career received an unexpected boost when Kum caught the attention of Kicker sports magazine's coverage of Germans playing abroad.

The following season, On 22 September 2010, Kum provided assist for Wesley Verhoek which he scored a winning goal in a 3–2 win over VVV-Venlo. ADO Den Haag was 7th place and won the play-offs which the club will play in the Europa League for the first time since 1987. The next season with the club in the Europa League, the club played it first European match in a 3–2 win over FK Tauras when Kum took a credit when he made a pass, resulting an own goal for Kazimieras Gnedojus to make it 3–2 with a win for ADO Den Haag. In the Second Leg, the club went on to win 2–0 and go through the third round where ADO lose 3–0 to AC Omonia and won 1–0 in the second leg, putting them out of the Europa League.

=== Heerenveen ===
On 1 July 2012, Kum moved to SC Heerenveen on a free transfer under new manager Marco van Basten to the club defensive options and becoming the sixth summer signing. Kum recently turned down a new deal at ADO and an offer from NEC Nijmegen.

=== Utrecht ===
On 24 June 2014, Kum signed with FC Utrecht on a free transfer.

== International career ==
Due to his good performance in the Jupiler League, Kum was pre-selected by Foppe de Haan for 2008 Beijing Olympic. In his first training, ahead of a friendly match against Sweden, Kum made a good first impression but suffered an injury. Because of his injury, Kum was not in the 18-man squad for the Olympics, but recovered in time to make the stand-by list. Kum has made no international appearances since.
