= 2013–14 SBV Vitesse season =

Vitesse Arnhem
2013–14 season
- Chairman: Merab Jordania
- Manager: Peter Bosz
- Eredivisie: 6th
- KNVB Cup: Fourth round
- Europa League: Third qualifying round
- Top goalscorer: League: Lucas Piazon (11); All: Lucas Piazon (11)
- Highest home attendance: 25,500
- Lowest home attendance: 13,778
Home colours	Away colours	Third colours

During the 2013–14 season Vitesse Arnhem participated in the Dutch Eredivisie, the KNVB Cup, and the UEFA Europa League.

== Events ==
On 18 May, manager Fred Rutten opted to not take up the contract renewal, and left the club. On 7 June, the club scheduled a friendly against Standard Liège, which will be played on 14 July. Six days later, the club announced a friendly with Lierse SK, scheduled to be played on 19 July.

On 14 June, Bayer Leverkusen is announced as the club's opponent on 27 July. The match will also be played at GelreDome.

On 19 June, Peter Bosz is announced as new manager. Late in the month, Vitesse announced Marko Vejinović as the first summer signing.

== Players ==
=== Squad details ===
As of 27 February 2014

No.	Name	Pos.	Nat.	Place of birth	Date of birth (age)	Club caps	Club goals	Int. apps	Int. goals	Signed from	Date signed	Fee	Contract End
Goalkeepers
1	Eloy Room	GK	(Netherlands)	Nijmegen	6 February 1989 (age 37)	51	0	–	–	Academy	1 July 2008	Free	30 June 2015
21	Marko Meerits	GK	(Estonia)	Tallinn	26 April 1992 (age 34)	4	0	2	0	Flora (Estonia)	6 July 2011	Free	30 June 2014
22	Piet Velthuizen	GK	(Netherlands)	Nijmegen	3 November 1986 (age 40)	216	0	1	0	Hércules (Spain)	26 July 2011	Free	30 June 2016
48	Jeroen Houwen	GK	(Netherlands)	Venray	18 February 1996 (age 30)	–	–	–	–	Academy	1 July 2013	Free	30 June 2015
Defenders
3	Dan Mori	CB	(Israel)	Tel Aviv	8 November 1988 (age 38)	13	0	7	0	Bnei Yahuda (Israel)	22 August 2012	Free	30 June 2015
5	Kelvin Leerdam	RB/DM	(Netherlands)	Paramaribo (Suriname)	24 June 1990 (age 36)	25	7	–	–	Feyenoord	2 July 2013	Free	30 June 2017
6	Frank van der Struijk	RB/CB	(Netherlands)	Boxtel	28 March 1985 (age 41)	127	2	–	–	Willem II	10 July 2008	€ 500K	30 June 2014
23	Jan-Arie van der Heijden	CB/DM	(Netherlands)	Schoonhoven	3 March 1988 (age 38)	100	5	–	–	Ajax	2 March 2011	Free	30 June 2015
37	Guram Kashia (c)	CB/RB	(Georgia (country))	Tbilisi	4 July 1987 (age 39)	140	10	28	1	Dinamo Tbilisi (Georgia (country))	31 August 2010	€ 300K	30 June 2016
38	Patrick van Aanholt	LB	(Netherlands)	's-Hertogenbosch	29 August 1990 (age 36)	77	7	1	0	Chelsea (England)	7 July 2013	Loan	30 June 2014
Midfielders
2	Rochdi Achenteh	CM/LB/LW	(Morocco)	Eindhoven (Netherlands)	7 March 1988 (age 38)	1	0	–	–	PEC Zwolle	15 January 2014	Undisc.	30 June 2016
7	Marko Vejinović	CM	(Netherlands)	Amsterdam	3 February 1990 (age 36)	25	1	–	–	Heracles Almelo	28 June 2013	Free	30 June 2017
10	Davy Pröpper	CM/AM	(Netherlands)	Arnhem	2 September 1991 (age 35)	113	12	–	–	Academy	1 January 2010	Free	30 June 2014
18	Valeri Kazaishvili	LW	(Georgia (country))	Ozurgeti	23 January 1993 (age 33)	32	5	–	–	Olimpi (Georgia (country))	9 August 2011	Nominal	30 June 2014
19	Christian Atsu	AM/LW/RW	(Ghana)	Ada Foah	10 January 1992 (age 34)	19	3	20	4	Chelsea (England)	31 August 2013	Loan	30 June 2014
20	Zakaria Labyad	LW/AM	(Morocco)	Utrecht (Netherlands)	9 March 1993 (age 33)	7	0	1	0	Sporting (England)	9 January 2014	Loan	30 June 2015
27	Bertrand Traoré	AM/LW	(Burkina Faso)	Bobo-Dioulasso	6 September 1995 (age 31)	6	0	11	1	Chelsea (England)	9 January 2014	Loan	30 June 2014
30	Renato Ibarra	RW	(Ecuador)	Ambuquí	20 January 1991 (age 35)	93	9	17	0	El Nacional (Ecuador)	8 July 2011	€ 2M	30 June 2014
34	Theo Janssen	CM/DM	(Netherlands)	Arnhem	27 July 1981 (age 45)	289	30	5	0	Ajax	27 August 2012	€ 600K	30 June 2015
39	Wimilio Vink	AM	(Netherlands)	Tiel	13 September 1993 (age 33)	1	0	–	–	Academy	1 July 2011	Free	30 June 2014
45	Gino Bosz	LW/RW	(Netherlands)	Rotterdam	23 April 1993 (age 33)	–	–	–	–	Academy	17 January 2014	Free	Undisclosed
46	Elmo Lieftink	LW/AM	(Netherlands)	Deventer	3 February 1994 (age 32)	–	–	–	–	Academy	1 December 2013	Free	30 June 2014
Forwards
9	Uroš Đurđević	ST	(Serbia)	Belgrade	2 March 1994 (age 32)	2	0	–	–	Rad (Serbia)	7 January 2014	Undisc.	30 June 2018
14	Mike Havenaar	ST/SS/AM	(Japan)	Hiroshima	20 May 1987 (age 39)	81	23	17	4	Ventforet Kofu (Japan)	21 December 2011	Free	30 June 2014
17	Lucas Piazon	SS/AM/LW	(Brazil)	São Paulo	20 January 1994 (age 32)	26	11	–	–	Chelsea (England)	9 August 2013	Loan	30 June 2014

== Transfers ==
=== In ===
No.	Pos.	Nat.	Name	Age	EU	Moving from	Type	Transfer window	Ends	Transfer fee	Source
11	MF	(Georgia (country))	Giorgi Chanturia	20	Non-EU	Alania Vladikavkaz (Russia)	Loan Return ✓	Summer	2014	Free	
19	FW	(Norway)	Marcus Pedersen	23	EU	OB (Denmark)	Loan Return ✓	Summer	2014	Free	
25	MF	(Morocco)	Adnane Tighadouini	20	EU	Cambuur	Loan Return ✓	Summer	2014	Free	
7	MF	(Netherlands)	Marko Vejinović	23	EU	Heracles	Transfer ✓	Summer	2017	Free	
5	DF	(Netherlands)	Kelvin Leerdam	23	EU	Feyenoord	Transfer ✓	Summer	2017	Free	
20	FW	(France)	Gaël Kakuta	22	EU	Chelsea (England)	Loan ✓	Summer	2014	Free	
38	DF	(Netherlands)	Patrick van Aanholt	23	EU	Chelsea (England)	Loan ✓	Summer	2014	Free	
21	GK	(Estonia)	Marko Meerits	21	EU	Flora (Estonia)	Loan Return ✓	Summer	2014	Free	
15	MF	(Chile)	Cristián Cuevas	18	Non-EU	Chelsea (England)	Loan ✓	Summer	2014	Free	
17	MF	(Brazil)	Lucas Piazón	19	EU	Chelsea (England)	Loan ✓	Summer	2014	Free	
19	FW	(Ghana)	Christian Atsu	21	Non-EU	Chelsea (England)	Loan ✓	Summer	2014	Free	
8	MF	(Portugal)	Francisco Júnior	21	EU	Everton (England)	Loan ✓	Summer	2014	Free	
2	DF	(England)	Sam Hutchinson	24	EU	Chelsea (England)	Loan ✓	Summer	2014	Free	
27	MF	(Burkina Faso)	Bertrand Traoré	18	Non-EU	Chelsea (England)	Loan ✓	Winter	2014	Free	
9	FW	(Serbia)	Uroš Đurđević	19	EU	Rad (Serbia)	Transfer ✓	Winter	2018	Undisclosed	
20	MF	(Morocco)	Zakaria Labyad	20	EU	Sporting CP (Portugal)	Loan ✓	Winter	2015	Free	
2	MF	(Morocco)	Rochdi Achenteh	25	EU	PEC Zwolle	Transfer ✓	Winter	2016	Undisclosed	

Total spending: ▼€0

=== Out ===
No.	Pos.	Nat.	Name	Age	EU	Moving to	Type	Transfer window	Transfer fee	Source
2	DF	(Czech Republic)	Tomáš Kalas	20	EU	Chelsea (England)	Loan Return ✓	Summer	Free	
16	DF	(Japan)	Michihiro Yasuda	25	Non-EU	Free agent	Contract Ended ✓	Summer	Free	
41	DF	(Netherlands)	Nando Wormgoor	21	EU	Dordrecht	Contract Ended ✓	Summer	Free	
7	MF	(Netherlands)	Nicky Hofs	30	EU	Free agent	Retired ✓	Summer	Free	
41	GK	(Netherlands)	Sebastiaan van der Sman	24	EU	Free agent	Released ✓	Summer	Free	
25	DF	(Serbia)	Nikola Aksentijević	20	Non-EU	Partizan (Serbia)	Loan ✓	Summer	Free	
8	MF	(Netherlands)	Marco van Ginkel	20	EU	Chelsea (England)	Transfer ✓	Summer	£8M	
9	FW	(Ivory Coast)	Wilfried Bony	24	Non-EU	Swansea City (Wales)	Transfer ✓	Summer	£12M	
1	GK	(Netherlands)	Eloy Room	24	EU	Go Ahead Eagles	Loan ✓	Summer	Free	
19	FW	(Norway)	Marcus Pedersen	23	EU	Barnsley (England)	Loan ✓	Summer	Free	
9	FW	(Brazil)	Jonathan Reis	24	EU	Bahia (Brazil)	Released ✓	During Season	Free	
25	FW	(Morocco)	Adnane Tighadouini	21	EU	NAC Breda	Transfer ✓	Winter	Undisclosed	
2	DF	(England)	Sam Hutchinson	24	EU	Chelsea (England)	Loan Return ✓	Winter	Free	
20	MF	(France)	Gaël Kakuta	22	EU	Chelsea (England)	Loan Return ✓	Winter	Free	
44	MF	(Netherlands)	Brahim Darri	19	EU	De Graafschap	Loan ✓	Winter	Free	
15	DF	(Chile)	Cristián Cuevas	18	EU	Chelsea (England)	Loan Return ✓	During Season	Free	
11	MF	(Georgia (country))	Giorgi Chanturia	20	EU	CFR Cluj (Romania)	Transfer ✓	During Season	Undisclosed	
8	MF	(Guinea-Bissau)	Francisco Júnior	22	EU	Everton (England)	Loan Return ✓	During Season	Free	

Total gaining: ▲€23,200,000 (£20,000,000)

== Competition ==
=== Eredivisie ===
==== League table ====
Pos	Team	Pld	W	D	L	GF	GA	GD	Pts	Qualification or relegation
4	PSV	34	18	5	11	60	45	+15	59	Qualification for the Europa League third qualifying round
5	Heerenveen	34	16	9	9	72	51	+21	57	Qualification for the European competition play-offs
6	Vitesse Arnhem	34	15	10	9	65	49	+16	55	Qualification for the European competition play-offs
7	Groningen (O)	34	14	9	11	57	53	+4	51	Qualification for the European competition play-offs
8	AZ	34	13	8	13	54	50	+4	47	Qualification for the European competition play-offs

Source: Eredivisie
Rules for classification: 1) points; 2) goal difference; 3) number of goals scored
(O) Play-off winners

==== Matches ====
11 August 2013 1	Vitesse Arnhem	3–1	Heracles Almelo	Arnhem
14:30	Leerdam 27'; Pedersen 31'; Ibarra 82'	Report	90+1' Amoah	Stadium: GelreDome; Attendance: 13,778; Referee: Pieter Vink

18 August 2013 2	RKC Waalwijk	4–2	Vitesse Arnhem	Waalwijk
16:30	Braber 12'; Castelen 39'; Duits 74' (pen.) 76'	Report	3' Leerdam; 54' Qazaishvili	Stadium: Mandemakers Stadion; Attendance: 6,000; Referee: Reinold Wiedemeijer

24 August 2013 3	Roda JC Kerkrade	1–1	Vitesse Arnhem	Kerkrade
20:45	Höcher 69'	Report	62' Qazaishvili	Stadium: Parkstad Limburg Stadion; Attendance: 11,894; Referee: Ed Janssen

1 September 2013 4	Vitesse Arnhem	1–0	FC Twente	Arnhem
14:30	Havenaar 22'	Report		Stadium: GelreDome; Attendance: 14,745; Referee: Serdar Gözübüyük

15 September 2013 5	AZ	1–1	Vitesse Arnhem	Alkmaar
16:30	Johansson 42'	Report	Reis 88'	Stadium: AFAS Stadion; Attendance: 15,047; Referee: Richard Liesveld

22 September 2013 7	Vitesse Arnhem	3–0	PEC Zwolle	Arnhem
12:30	Piazón 35', 88'; Leerdam 68'	Report		Stadium: GelreDome; Attendance: 15,200; Referee: Tom van Sichem

29 September 2013 8	N.E.C.	2–3	Vitesse Arnhem	Nijmegen
12:30	Hemlein 33'; Higdon 85'	Report	11' Leerdam; 41' (pen.) Janssen; 90+2' Piazón	Stadium: Goffertstadion; Attendance: 11,500; Referee: Pol van Boekel

2 October 2013 6	ADO Den Haag	2–1	Vitesse Arnhem	The Hague
15:30	Kramer 7'; Gehrt 70'	Report	65' Pröpper	Stadium: Kyocera Stadion; Attendance: 9,080; Referee: Eric Braamhaar

6 October 2013 9	Vitesse Arnhem	1–2	Feyenoord	Arnhem
14:30	Leerdam (yellow card) 37'; Havenaar (yellow card) 74' (goal) 83'	Summary	de Vrij 18' (yellow card) 74'; Pellè 20' (yellow card) 87'; Mulder (yellow card) 76'	Stadium: GelreDome; Attendance: 18,200; Referee: Pieter Vink

19 October 2013 10	SC Heerenveen	2–3	Vitesse Arnhem	Heerenveen
20:45	Finnbogason 43'; Otigba 49'		54' 73' Piazón; 90+3' Van Aanholt	Stadium: Abe Lenstra Stadion; Attendance: 22,000; Referee: Richard Liesveld

27 October 2013 11	Vitesse Arnhem	2–2	FC Groningen	Arnhem
16:30	Havenaar 32'; Pröpper 73'		75' Zivkovic; 78' Chery	Stadium: GelreDome; Attendance: 19,104; Referee: Björn Kuipers

2 November 2013 12	Ajax	0–1	Vitesse Arnhem	Amsterdam
18:45			90' Qazaishvili	Stadium: Amsterdam ArenA; Attendance: 51,377; Referee: Bas Nijhuis

9 November 2013 13	Vitesse Arnhem	3–1	FC Utrecht	Arnhem
19:45	Atsu 31' (pen.); Havenaar 86'; Pröpper 90+3'		63' (pen.) De Ridder	Stadium: GelreDome; Attendance: 16,779; Referee: Pol van Boekel

24 November 2013 14	Go Ahead Eagles	0–3	Vitesse Arnhem	Deventer
14:30			35' (pen.) 41' (pen.) Piazon; 65' Kakuta	Stadium: De Adelaarshorst; Attendance: 7,473; Referee: Danny Makkelie

1 December 2013 15	Vitesse Arnhem	3–0	SC Cambuur	Arnhem
14:30	Vejinović 33'; Leerdam 50'; Chanturia 90+2'			Stadium: GelreDome; Attendance: 16,903; Referee: Björn Kuipers

7 December 2013 16	PSV	2–6	Vitesse Arnhem	Eindhoven
20:45	Memphis 45'; Rekik 84'		38' Piazon; 66' Havenaar; 75' Leerdam; 85' 90+3' Pröpper; 87' Van Aanholt	Stadium: Philips Stadion; Attendance: 33,000; Referee: Bas Nijhuis

15 December 2013 17	Vitesse Arnhem	3–2	NAC Breda	Arnhem
14:30	Piazon 35' (pen.) 50'; Leerdam 84'		24' (pen.) Buijs; 89' Lurling	Stadium: GelreDome; Attendance: 20,800; Referee: Tom van Sichem

21 December 2013 18	Heracles Almelo	2–2	Vitesse Arnhem	Almelo
19:45	Linssen 51' 77'		6' Van Aanholt; 41' Piazon	Stadium: Polman Stadion; Attendance: 8,470; Referee: Pieter Vink

18 January 2014 19	PEC Zwolle	1–2	Vitesse Arnhem	Zwolle
19:45	Fernandez 10'		3' Atsu; 90' Van Aanholt	Stadium: IJsseldelta Stadion; Attendance: 12,350; Referee: Richard Liesveld

26 January 2014 20	Vitesse Arnhem	1–1	N.E.C.	Arnhem
12:30	Mori 30'		71' Higdon	Stadium: GelreDome; Attendance: 20,613; Referee: Pieter Vink

31 January 2014 21	Feyenoord	1–1	Vitesse Arnhem	Rotterdam
20:00	Pellè 39'		57' Kashia	Stadium: De Kuip; Attendance: 47,000; Referee: Serdar Gözübüyük

4 February 2014 22	Vitesse Arnhem	0–2	AZ	Arnhem
20:45			20' (o.g.) Van Aanholt; 42' Jóhannsson	Stadium: GelreDome; Attendance: 18,213; Referee: Reinold Wiedemeijer

7 February 2014 23	Vitesse Arnhem	0–0	ADO Den Haag	Arnhem
20:00	Pröpper (yellow card) 40' van der Struijk (yellow card) 58'; Labyad (yellow card) 70' van Aanholt (yellow card) 80'	Summary	(yellow card) 49' Bakker; (yellow card) 58' Alberg; (yellow card) 74' Beugelsdijk	Stadium: GelreDome; Attendance: 16,753; Referee: Pol van Boekel

15 February 2014 24	FC Twente	2–0	Vitesse Arnhem	Enschede
18:45	Castaignos 55'; Eghan (yellow card) 64'; Tadić 78'	Summary	(yellow card) 4' Leerdam; (yellow card) 59' Vejinović; (red card) 60' van Aanholt	Stadium: De Grolsch Veste; Attendance: 29,900; Referee: Pieter Vink

23 February 2014 25	Vitesse Arnhem	3–1	RKC Waalwijk	Arnhem
14:30	Havenaar 50'; Qazaishvili 52'; Atsu 68'		14' Anderson	Stadium: GelreDome; Attendance: 23,411; Referee: Dennis Higler

1 March 2014 26	Vitesse Arnhem	3–0	Roda JC Kerkrade	Arnhem
20:45	Havenaar 14' 76'; Vejinović 29'			Stadium: GelreDome; Attendance: 16,908; Referee: Richard Liesveld

8 March 2014 27	NAC Breda	1–2	Vitesse Arnhem	Breda
20:45	Buijs 10' (pen.)		8' Labyad; 26' Havenaar	Stadium: Rat Verlegh Stadion; Attendance: 17,800; Referee: Björn Kuipers

15 March 2014 28	Vitesse Arnhem	1–2	PSV	Arnhem
18:45	Labyad 18'		7' Locadia; 29' Memphis	Stadium: GelreDome; Attendance: 23,076; Referee: Kevin Blom

22 March 2014 29	FC Groningen	3–1	Vitesse Arnhem	Groningen
18:45	Zivkovic 10'; Van der Velden 56'; Chery 63'		39' Atsu	Stadium: Euroborg; Attendance: 19,787; Referee: Pieter Vink

29 March 2014 30	Vitesse Arnhem	2–2	SC Heerenveen	Arnhem
18:45	Havenaar 31'; Traoré 67'		39' Finnbogason; 58' Başaçikoğlu	Stadium: GelreDome; Attendance: 22,176; Referee: Bas Nijhuis

6 April 2014 31	Vitesse Arnhem	1–1	Ajax	Arnhem
14:30	Traoré 25'		47' Sigþórsson	Stadium: GelreDome; Attendance: 25,500; Referee: Björn Kuipers

12 April 2014 32	SC Cambuur	4–3	Vitesse Arnhem	Leeuwarden
19:45	Barto 25', 69'; Leerdam 29' (o.g.); Ogbeche 64'	Summary	Leerdam 21'; Pröpper (yellow card) 30'; Atsu 39'; Traoré 56'	Stadium: Cambuur Stadion; Attendance: 9,639; Referee: Kevin Blom

27 April 2014 33	Vitesse Arnhem	2–2	Go Ahead Eagles	Arnhem
14:30	Leerdam (yellow card) 57'; Kashia 71'; Pröpper 79'; Piazon (yellow card) 90'	Summary	Kolder 30'; Antonia 55'	Stadium: GelreDome; Attendance: 20,874; Referee: Tom van Sichem

3 May 2014 34	FC Utrecht	2–1	Vitesse Arnhem	Utrecht
18:45	De Ridder 40'; Agudelo 78'		68' Labyad	Stadium: Stadion Galgenwaard; Attendance: 19,504; Referee: Richard Liesveld

=== KNVB Cup ===
25 September 2013 Second round	RVVH	1–3	Vitesse Arnhem	Ridderkerk
17:00	Eggers 37'	Report	45+1' Janssen; 65' Kashia; 74' Van der Heijden	Stadium: Sportpark Ridderkerk; Attendance: 1,600; Referee: Allard Lindhout

30 October 2013 Third round	Vitesse Arnhem	5–0	VV Noordwijk	Arnhem
20:00	Kakuta 2' 83'; Van der Struijk 35'; Chanturia 72'; Santos 77'			Stadium: GelreDome; Attendance: 6,210; Referee: Dennis Higler

18 December 2013 Fourth round	Roda JC Kerkrade	3–1	Vitesse Arnhem	Kerkrade
19:45	Hupperts 66' 90+5'; Höcher 84'		76' Van Aanholt	Stadium: Parkstad Limburg Stadion; Referee: Kevin Blom

=== UEFA Europa League ===
==== Third qualifying round ====
1 August 2013 First leg	(Romania) FC Petrolul Ploiești	1–1	Vitesse Arnhem	Ploiești
19:00	Grozav 84'	Report	52' (pen.) Reis	Stadium: Stadionul Ilie Oană; Attendance: 11,827; Referee: (Spain) Carlos Del Cerro

8 August 2013 Second leg	Vitesse Arnhem	1–2 (2–3 agg.)	FC Petrolul Ploiești (Romania)	Arnhem
20:00	Van der Heijden 72'	Report	21' Boudjemaa; 90+5' Grozav	Stadium: GelreDome; Attendance: 10,088; Referee: (Croatia) Ante Vučemilović-Šimunović Jr.

=== European competition play-offs ===
==== First round ====
7 May 2014 First leg	FC Groningen	1–0	Vitesse Arnhem	Groningen
18:45	Burnet 88'			Stadium: Euroborg; Attendance: 21,460; Referee: Pol van Boekel

10 May 2014 Second leg	Vitesse Arnhem	1–4 (1–5 agg.)	FC Groningen	Arnhem
18:45	Pröpper 63'		25' Chery; 64' Zivkovic; 83' 89' Kostić	Stadium: GelreDome; Attendance: 17,112; Referee: Pieter Vink

=== Friendlies ===
==== Pre-season ====
22 June 2013	SV de Valleivogels	1–13	Vitesse Arnhem	Scherpenzeel
18:30	Tim Colijn 73'	Report	10' 28' Reis; 16' Kazaishvili; 17' (o.g.) Mike Abbink; 19' 32' Tighadouini; 25' 44' Darri; 58' 75' Chanturia; 79' Mori; 83' Osman; 87' Kallon	Stadium: Sportpark De Bree-West; Attendance: 1,000; Referee: Roelof Luinge

29 June 2013	OWIOS	0–11	Vitesse Arnhem	Oldebroek
14:30		Report	9' (o.g.) Arjan Boon; 15' (pen.) 67' Reis; 38' 49' Darri; 51' Pröpper; 56' Kazaishvili; 69' Tighadouini; 79' (pen.) Chanturia; 88' Mori; 89' Talsma	Stadium: Sportpark Bovenmolen; Attendance: 1,250; Referee: Wilco Jansen

6 July 2013	Vitesse Arnhem	5–0	Voorwaarts Twello	Hoenderloo
15:00	Reis 12'; Pedersen 23'; Janssen 32'; Tighadouini 35'; Leerdam 85'	Report		Stadium: Sportpark SV Beatrix; Attendance: 800; Referee: Gerrit Fikkert

14 July 2013	(Belgium) Standard Liège	0–1	Vitesse Arnhem	Wavre
16:00		Report	71' Reis	Stadium: Stade Justin Peeters; Attendance: 3,000; Referee: (Belgium) Erik Lambrechts

19 July 2013	(Belgium) Lierse	2–1	Vitesse Arnhem	Lier
19:30	Ghaly 4'; Menga 22'	Report	12' Janssen	Stadium: Herman Vanderpoortenstadion; Attendance: 2,000; Referee: (Belgium) Dirk Schoenmaeckers

27 July 2013	Vitesse Arnhem	0–4	Bayer Leverkusen (Germany)	Arnhem
15:30			8' Reinartz; 19' 89' Kießling; 42' Bender	Stadium: GelreDome; Attendance: 6,010; Referee: Pol van Boekel

==== Winter ====
7 January 2014	(Germany) VfL Wolfsburg	2–3	Vitesse Arnhem	Abu Dhabi
19:30	Dost 83' (pen.) 86'		28' Havenaar; 34' Piazon; 75' (pen.) Chanturia	Stadium: Zayed Sports City Stadium; Attendance: 100; Referee: (United Arab Emirates) Adel Al Naqbi

10 January 2014	(Germany) Hamburger SV	0–0	Vitesse Arnhem	Abu Dhabi
21:30				Stadium: Zayed Sports City Stadium; Referee: (United Arab Emirates) Ali Hasan Karim
