= Talsma =

Talsma is a Dutch surname. Notable people with the surname include:

- Hendrik-Jan Talsma (born 1978), Dutch public prosecutor and politician
- Marwin Talsma (born 1997), Dutch speed skater
- Roy Talsma (born 1994), Dutch footballer
