= Struijk =

Struijk is a Dutch surname. Notable people with the surname include:

- Michelle Struijk (born 1998), Belgian field hockey player
- Pascal Struijk (born 1999), Belgian-born Dutch footballer
- Frank van der Struijk (born 1985), Dutch footballer
