= Arkadiusz Milik =

Polish footballer (born 1994)

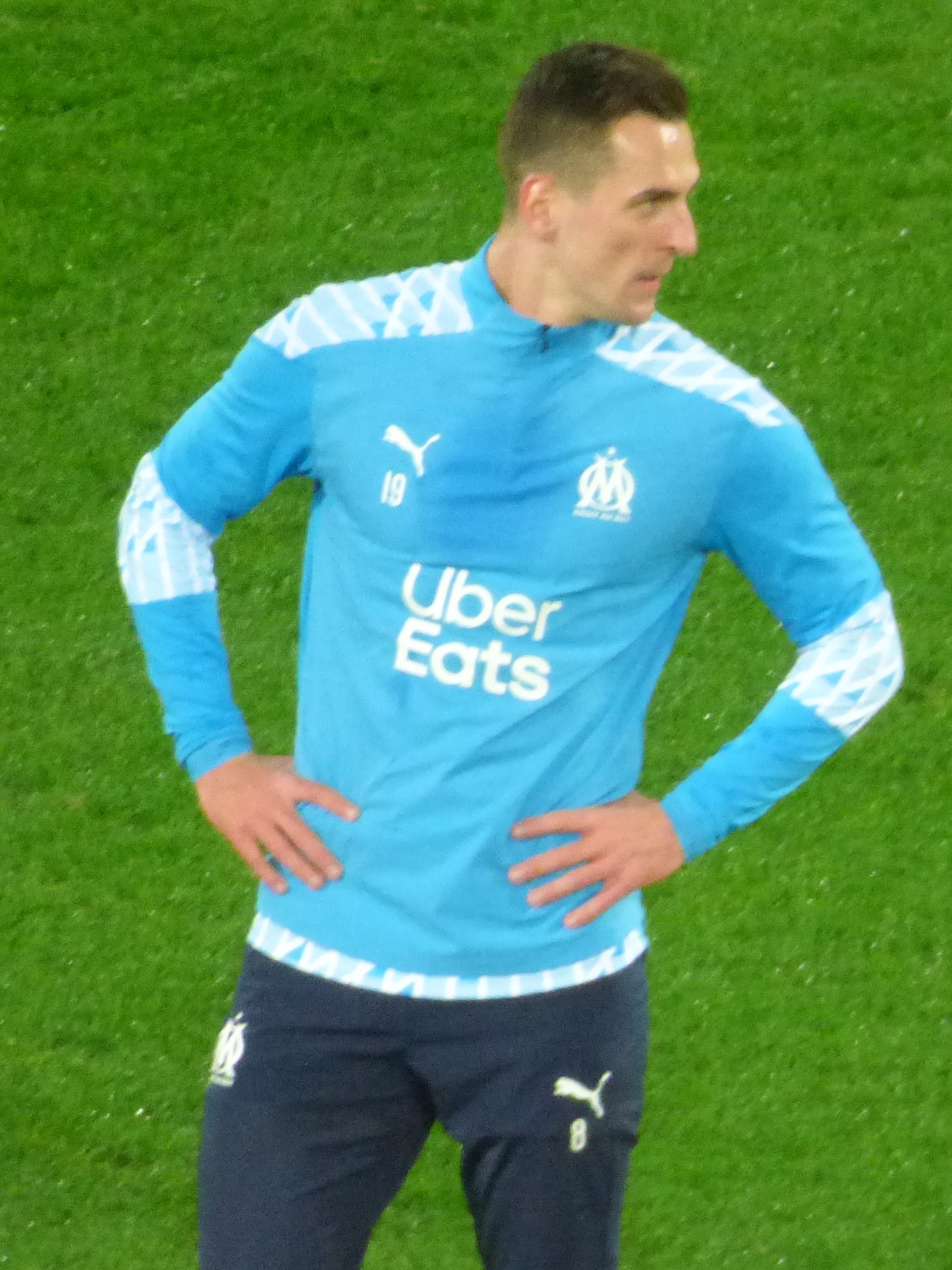
- Milik with Marseille in 2021

Personal information
- Full name: Arkadiusz Krystian Milik
- Date of birth: 28 February 1994 (age 32)
- Place of birth: Tychy, Poland
- Height: 1.86 m (6 ft 1 in)
- Position: Striker

Team information
- Current team: Juventus
- Number: 14

Youth career
- 2000–2010: Rozwój Katowice

Senior career*
Years	Team	Apps	(Gls)
2010–2011	Rozwój Katowice	10	(4)
2011–2013	Górnik Zabrze	38	(11)
2013–2015	Bayer Leverkusen	6	(0)
2013–2014	→ FC Augsburg (loan)	18	(2)
2014–2015	→ Ajax (loan)	21	(11)
2015–2016	Ajax	31	(21)
2016–2022	Napoli	93	(38)
2021–2022	→ Marseille (loan)	38	(16)
2022–2023	Marseille	2	(0)
2022–2023	→ Juventus (loan)	27	(7)
2023–	Juventus	34	(4)

International career^{‡}
2011	Poland U17	5	(1)
2011–2012	Poland U19	11	(3)
2012–2014	Poland U21	15	(3)
2012–2024	Poland	73	(17)
- * Club domestic league appearances and goals as of 23:33, 6 April 2026 (UTC) ‡ National team caps and goals as of 7 June 2024

Arkadiusz Krystian Milik (pronounced [arˈkadjuʂ ˈmilik]; born 28 February 1994) is a Polish professional footballer who plays as a striker for Serie A club Juventus.

Milik began his career as a footballer in the Rozwój Katowice youth squad. In 2011, he signed a one-year contract with Górnik Zabrze, and in 2012 he transferred to Bayer Leverkusen and later played on loan for FC Augsburg and Ajax respectively. In 2015–16, he was purchased by Ajax on a four-year deal for a reported €2.8 million fee. While playing for Ajax, Milik became one of the top goalscorers in Eredivisie. On 1 August 2016, he joined Italian club Napoli for €35 million, effectively replacing Gonzalo Higuaín. On 21 January 2021, he joined French club Marseille on loan from Napoli.

At international level, Milik participated at UEFA Euro 2016 with Poland and reached the quarter-final stage of the tournament. He also took part at the 2018 FIFA World Cup, where his team was eliminated in the group stage, and the 2022 World Cup, where his team advanced to the round of 16.

== Early life ==
Sławomir "Moki" Mogilan, a football coach, recognized Milik's footballing talent and helped develop his abilities, fostering a greater professionalism in his outlook. When he was 16 years old, reports of the talented youngster had reached England and he was invited to trial with Tottenham Hotspur and Reading, but ultimately decided to focus on his football in Poland.

== Club career ==
=== Rozwój Katowice ===
Milik began his career as a youth player for Rozwój Katowice and played in the reserve team during the 2009–10 season. On 23 October 2010, the 16-year-old made his III liga debut when he scored two goals in a 4–0 victory over KS Krasiejów. In November, he went on trial at Górnik Zabrze, where he scored one goal in two appearances for the club's Młoda Ekstraklasa team. In winter, he and his teammate Wojciech Król were on trial with Reading, Tottenham Hotspur and Legia Warszawa. Milik ended the season with ten appearances and four goals for Rozwój Katowice.

=== Górnik Zabrze ===
Despite offers from other clubs, on 1 July 2011 Milik signed a one-year contract with Górnik Zabrze for a fee of 500,000 zlotys. Milik made his Ekstraklasa debut on 31 July in a 1–1 draw with Śląsk Wrocław; in the 53rd minute, he was substituted by Daniel Gołębiewski.

=== Bayer Leverkusen ===
On 17 December 2012, Bundesliga side Bayer Leverkusen confirmed they had signed Milik on a contract until summer 2018, for a reported transfer fee of €2.6 million. Milik failed to impress at Leverkusen though, making only 6 appearances before being demoted to the Leverkusen reserve team.

==== Loan to FC Augsburg ====
On 30 August 2013, FC Augsburg signed Milik on a one-year loan deal. The loan fee was reported to be €150,000, and composed of a base amount that decreased the more games Milik played for Augsburg and increased if Augsburg maintained its Bundesliga status. During his spell in Augsburg, he was capped in 18 matches, but he only scored 2 goals. However, he scored an equalizer in the 88th minute in a 2–2 home draw against Borussia Mönchengladbach, helping Augsburg earn a vital point.

=== Ajax ===
On 15 May 2014, it was announced that Milik would spend the 2014–15 season on loan at reigning Dutch champions Ajax, with a purchase option of €2.8 million.

==== 2014–15 season ====
On 24 September 2014, Milik played in the first official Amsterdam derby to be contested since 1983 when Ajax took on JOS Watergraafsmeer in the KNVB Cup. Milik earned the man of the match award after scoring six out of the club's nine goals and assisting a further two in the Olympic Stadium. On 10 December 2014, he scored his first Champions League goal in a 4–0 victory over APOEL. On 1 April 2015, Ajax reached an agreement with Bayer Leverkusen to purchase Milik outright on a four-year deal for a reported €2.8 million fee.

==== 2015–16 season ====
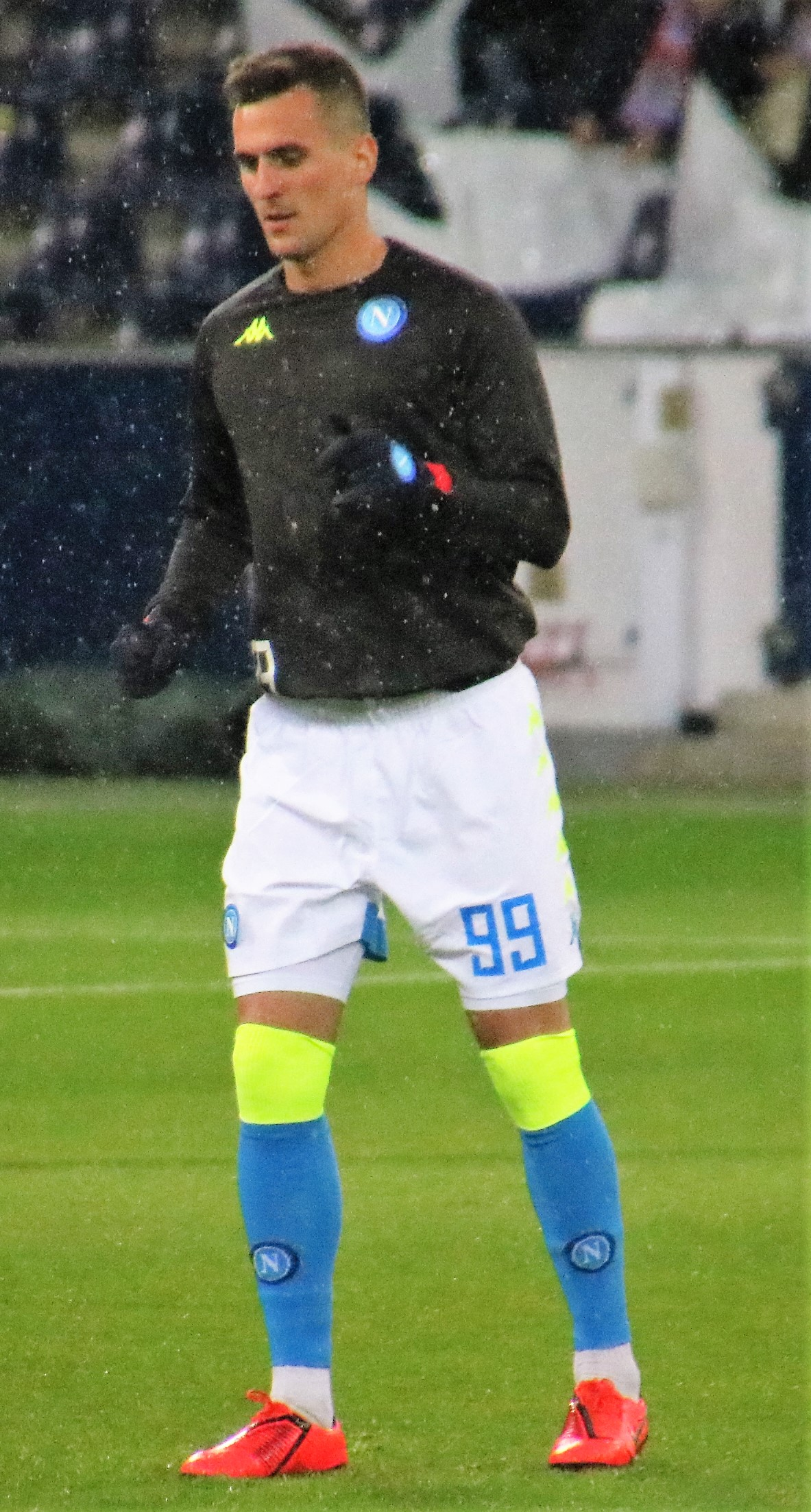
Arkadiusz Milik in 2019

On 26 June 2015, Ajax announced Milik would replace departing striker Kolbeinn Sigþórsson as the club's number 9 for the 2015–16 season, switching from kit number 19. Milik scored his first goal that season in a UEFA Champions League qualifier against Rapid Wien, making the scoreline 1–2. The game was eventually lost 2–3 and the two-legged tie 4–5 on aggregate to Rapid, relegating Ajax to the UEFA Europa League play-off against Czech side Jablonec.

Milik scored his first goal of the 2015–16 Eredivisie season against Willem II after newly appointed captain Davy Klaassen provided him with a cross, which Milik headed-in. Ajax went on to win the game 3–0 after a brace from Anwar El Ghazi. In the first leg of the Europa League play-off qualifier against Jablonec, Milik scored a penalty after Klaassen was fouled in the box; the goal was the winner in a 1–0 match. During the beginning of the season, Milik also scored goals against Willem II, NEC and Excelsior. Nearly a month later, on 31 October, he began a scoring streak again, this time scoring two against Roda JC in a 6–0 rout. Milik also scored league goals against Cambuur on 11 November and Heerenveen on 5 December, the latter in which he also missed a penalty. On 26 November, Milik scored the 1–1 equalizer against Celtic in the Europa League group stage, where Ajax went on to win 2–1 away in Glasgow. On 20 December, Ajax's final match before the winter break, he also scored the opening goal against De Graafschap in an eventual 2–1 home victory at the Amsterdam Arena.

After the winter break, Milik was out of form and got a lot of criticism, having gone scoreless in Ajax's first three Eredivisie matches. He broke his poor run of form by scoring against Roda JC on 31 January 2016 in a 2–2 away draw. On 21 February, against Excelsior, he then scored a brace, while in Ajax's next home game, on 28 February, he scored another two goals against AZ. One week later, on 6 March, Milik scored against Willem II in an eventual 0–4 away win in Tilburg.

=== Napoli ===
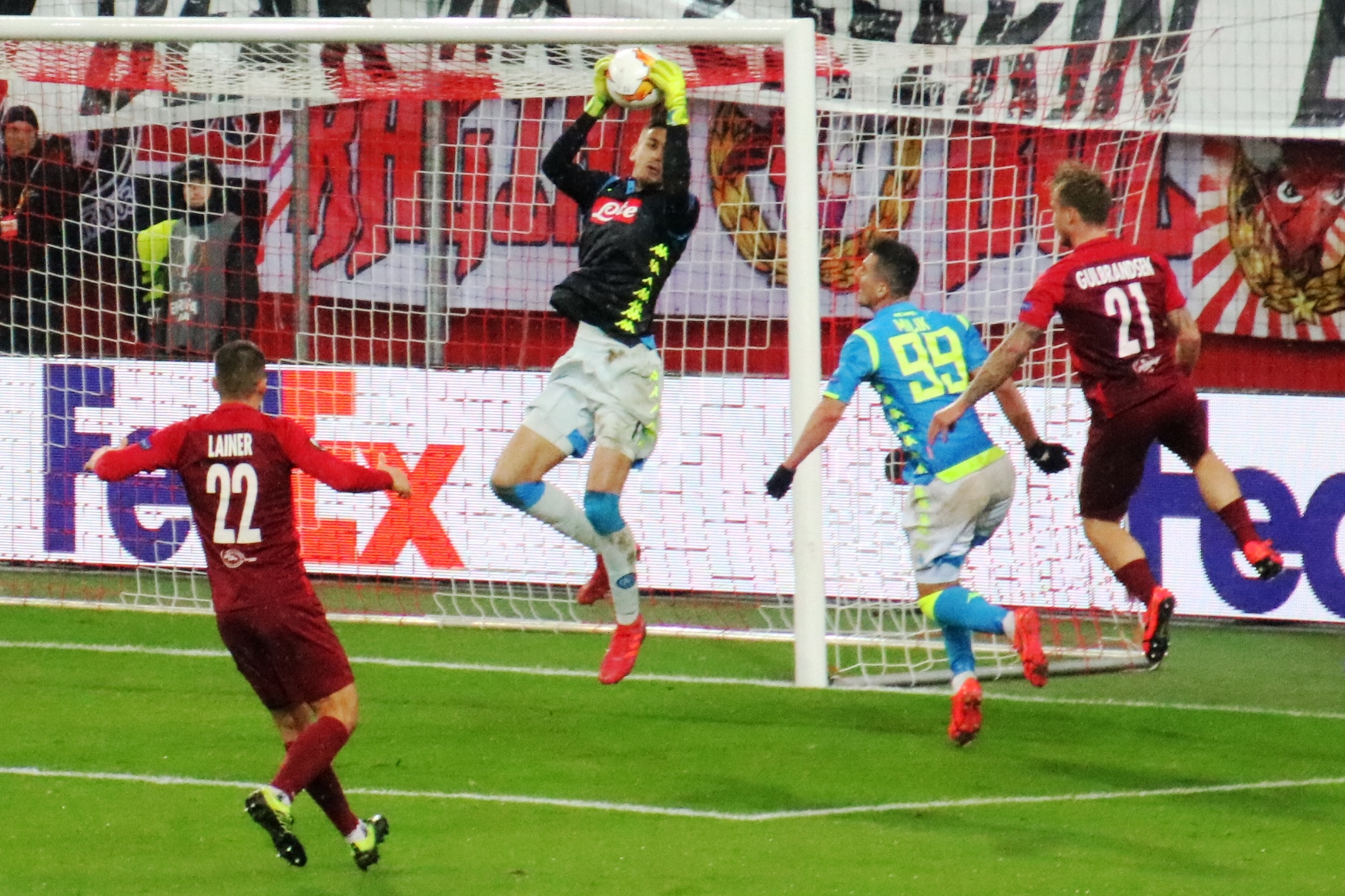
Milik (second from right) playing for Napoli against FC Salzburg in 2019

Milik signed with Napoli on 1 August 2016; his €35 million transfer was officially confirmed by the club the following afternoon. He made his club debut on 27 August, scoring his first two goals for Napoli in a 4–2 home win over Milan in Serie A. He scored braces again against Dynamo Kyiv and Bologna in September, but on 8 October, Milik tore his anterior cruciate ligament in a Polish international fixture against Denmark and was expected to be out for the rest of the season. However, as of 12 February 2017, he resumed playing and was fielded again on 15 February in the Champions League match against Real Madrid.

In September, Milik suffered his second anterior cruciate ligament injury in under 12 months – in his other knee, on this occasion – and was expected to be ruled out for at least four months; in January 2018, he underwent medical tests and was cleared to resume training.

In the 2020 Coppa Italia final on 17 June, following a 0–0 draw after regulation time, Milik scored the winning spot kick in a 4–2 penalty shoot-out victory against Juventus.

In the 2020–21 season, after having decided not to extend his contract and at the same time rejected a number of transfer options, Milik was excluded from the official Serie A and UEFA Europa League squads.

=== Marseille ===
On 21 January 2021, Milik joined Ligue 1 club Olympique de Marseille on an 18-month loan deal with an obligation to buy. He made his debut in a 3–1 loss against Monaco on 23 January. On 17 October 2021, he scored his 10th goal for Marseille in his 17th appearance in a 4–1 win against Lorient becoming the most efficient goalscorer for the club since Sonny Anderson in the 1993–94 season. On 19 December 2021, he scored a hat-trick against Cannet Rocheville in a 4–1 Marseille win, helping his club advance to the round of 16 in the Coupe de France. On 31 January, he scored another goal for the club in a 1:1 draw against Montpellier HSC helping Marseille to advance to the quarterfinals of the Coupe de France after a penalty shootout (5:4). On 4 February, he scored a hat-trick in a 5:2 victory against Angers SCO. On 17 February, he scored two goals for Marseille in a Europa Conference League match against Qarabağ FK. By achieving this, he became the second Marseille player in the 21st century to score at least six goals in UEFA competitions after Didier Drogba who scored 11 goals during the 2003–04 UEFA Cup.

=== Juventus ===
On 26 August 2022, Juventus announced the signing of Milik on loan from Marseille for the 2022–23 season. He became the third Polish footballer to play for the club, after Zbigniew Boniek and Wojciech Szczęsny. On 31 August, he scored his first goal for Juventus in a 2–0 victory over Spezia.

On 21 June 2023, Juventus signed Milik from Marseille on a permanent basis. On 11 January 2024, he scored a hat-trick in a 4–0 victory over Frosinone helping Juventus advance to its fifth consecutive Coppa Italia semifinal. On 23 April 2024, he scored the winning goal in a 2–1 loss (2–3 agg.) over Lazio securing his side the spot in the Coppa Italia final. He missed the entire 2024–25 season after undergoing meniscus surgery in June 2024, as well as the majority of the 2025–26 season.

== International career ==
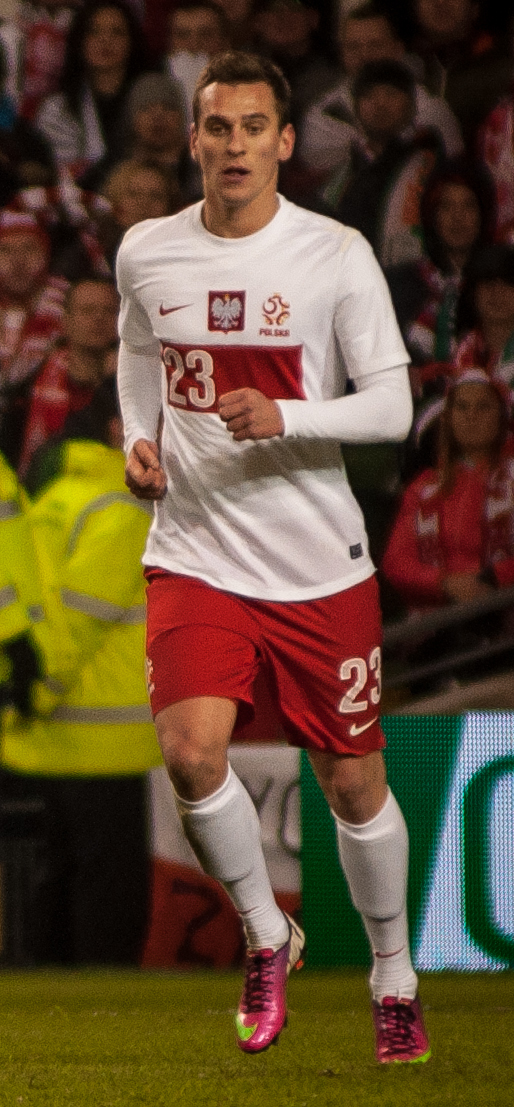
Milik playing for Poland in 2013

On 13 April 2011, Milik scored a goal for Poland under-17 side in a 4–1 victory over England Schools U18. On 15 July 2011, he was called up to the under-19 team.

On 12 October 2012, Milik debuted for the Polish senior team against South Africa. On 14 December, he scored his first goal for the national side in the 4–1 friendly victory over Macedonia.

Milik scored nine times for Poland under-21s during qualification for the 2015 UEFA European Under-21 Championship, including back-to-back hat-tricks against Malta and Greece in November 2013.

=== UEFA Euro 2016 ===
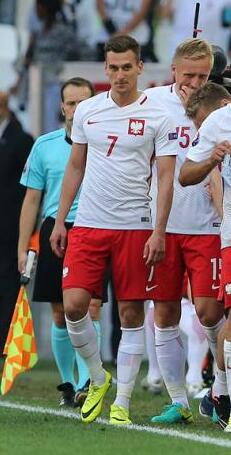
Milik with Poland at Euro 2016

On 11 October 2014, Milik scored the opening goal in a 2–0 win over world champions Germany in a 2016 UEFA Euro qualifying match. This was Poland's first win over Germany, who had not lost in 19 competitive games and 33 previous qualifiers. Milik formed a successful strike partnership with Robert Lewandowski during qualification for the European Championships, with additional goals coming in a 2–2 draw with Scotland, a 4–0 win away to Georgia and another 4–0 defeat of the same opposition at the National Stadium in Warsaw.

In Euro 2016, Milik scored for Poland in their opening game, beating Northern Ireland 1–0. He also netted his attempt in his nation's penalty shootout exit to eventual champions Portugal in the quarterfinals.

=== 2018 FIFA World Cup ===
Milik appeared in the 2018 FIFA World Cup in Russia. His nation was defeated 2–1 in their opening match against Senegal, and then lost 3–0 in their second group match against Colombia. Poland managed a 1–0 win over Japan in their final group match but were eliminated in the first round.

=== 2022 FIFA World Cup ===
After missing UEFA Euro 2020 due to an injury, Milik was selected for Poland's next international tournament appearance, the 2022 FIFA World Cup in Qatar. He appeared in three out of four games, as Poland were knocked out in the round of 16 by France.

=== UEFA Euro 2024 ===
On 29 May 2024, Milik was named in the preliminary squad for UEFA Euro 2024, played in Germany. 80 seconds into Poland's first preparation game after the call-ups, a friendly against Ukraine on 7 June, he suffered a knee injury when challenging for a ball, which ruled him out of the tournament.

== Style of play ==
Usually deployed as an out-and-out striker, Milik is a versatile and well-rounded left-footed forward who is also capable of playing off another forward as a second striker or as a winger, due to his ability to both score and create goals. He possesses pace and good movement off the ball, as well as a powerful and accurate shot, which make him an excellent finisher and goalscorer; he is also physically strong, agile, and a good header of the ball, which allows him to excel in the air. His playing style has been compared to that of his compatriot Robert Lewandowski in the Polish sports media. Regarded as a promising young striker in his youth, in 2012, Don Balón named him one of the 101 most promising young players in the world born after 1991.

== Personal life ==
In 2013, Milik began dating Polish model Jessica Ziółek. They had been in the relationship for nearly eight years before calling off their engagement in late 2020. Milik has since started a relationship with Agata Sieramska.

Milik features on the cover of the Polish version of FIFA 16 alongside global cover star Lionel Messi.

Growing up, Milik supported Manchester United. In 2012, he was quoted as saying that he "dreams of playing for Manchester United" but insists he's "far from it".

Milik's childhood football hero is Cristiano Ronaldo; in an interview during Euro 2016, he said he followed Ronaldo closely and had been inspired by the Portuguese striker.

== Career statistics ==
=== Club ===
As of match played 6 April 2026

Appearances and goals by club, season and competition
Club	Season	League			National cup (Note: Includes Polish Cup, DFB-Pokal, KNVB Cup, Coppa Italia, Coupe de France)		Europe		Other		Total	
Club	Season	Division	Apps	Goals	Apps	Goals	Apps	Goals	Apps	Goals	Apps	Goals
Rozwój Katowice	2010–11	III liga	10	4	0	0	—		—		10	4
Górnik Zabrze	2011–12	Ekstraklasa	24	4	1	0	—		—		25	4
Górnik Zabrze	2012–13	Ekstraklasa	14	7	1	1	—		—		15	8
Górnik Zabrze	Total		38	11	2	1	—		—		40	12
Bayer Leverkusen	2012–13	Bundesliga	6	0	0	0	2 (Note: Appearances in UEFA Europa League)	0	—		8	0
FC Augsburg (loan)	2013–14	Bundesliga	18	2	2	0	—		—		20	2
Ajax (loan)	2014–15	Eredivisie	21	11	3	8	9	4	1 (Note: Appearance in Johan Cruyff Shield)	0	34	23
Ajax	2015–16	Eredivisie	31	21	2	0	9	3	—		42	24
Ajax	Ajax total		52	32	5	8	18	7	1	0	76	47
Napoli	2016–17	Serie A	17	5	2	0	4 (Note: Appearances in UEFA Champions League)	3	—		23	8
Napoli	2017–18	Serie A	15	5	0	0	2	1	—		17	6
Napoli	2018–19	Serie A	35	17	2	1	10 (Note: Four appearances in UEFA Champions League, six appearances and two goals in UEFA Europa League)	2	—		47	20
Napoli	2019–20	Serie A	26	11	4	0	5	3	—		35	14
Napoli	Total		93	38	8	1	21	9	—		122	48
Marseille (loan)	2020–21	Ligue 1	15	9	1	1	—		—		16	10
Marseille (loan)	2021–22	Ligue 1	23	7	4	5	10 (Note: Five appearances and four goals in UEFA Europa League, five appearances and four goals in UEFA Europa Conference League)	8	—		37	20
Marseille	2022–23	Ligue 1	2	0	0	0	0	0	—		2	0
Marseille	Marseille total		40	16	5	6	10	8	—		55	30
Juventus (loan)	2022–23	Serie A	27	7	3	0	9 (Note: Five appearances and two goals in UEFA Champions League, four appearances in UEFA Europa League)	2	—		39	9
Juventus	2023–24	Serie A	32	4	4	4	—		—		36	8
Juventus	2024–25	Serie A	0	0	0	0	0	0	0	0	0	0
Juventus	2025–26	Serie A	2	0	0	0	0	0	—		2	0
Juventus	Juventus total		61	11	7	4	9	2	0	0	77	17
Career total			304	108	29	20	60	26	1	0	394	154

=== International ===
As of match played 7 June 2024

Appearances and goals by national team and year
National team	Year	Apps	Goals
Poland	2012	4	1
Poland	2013	2	0
Poland	2014	8	5
Poland	2015	8	4
Poland	2016	11	1
Poland	2017	3	1
Poland	2018	9	1
Poland	2019	4	1
Poland	2020	7	1
Poland	2021	5	1
Poland	2022	6	0
Poland	2023	5	1
Poland	2024	1	0
Total		73	17

As of match played 7 June 2024
Scores and results list Poland's goal tally first, score column indicates score after each Milik goal.

List of international goals scored by Arkadiusz Milik
No.	Date	Venue	Cap	Opponent	Score	Result	Competition
1	14 December 2012	Mardan Sports Complex, Aksu, Turkey	4	Macedonia	1–0	4–1	Friendly
2	6 June 2014	Stadion Energa, Gdańsk, Poland	9	Lithuania	1–1	2–1	Friendly
3	11 October 2014	National Stadium, Warsaw, Poland	11	Germany	1–0	2–0	UEFA Euro 2016 qualification
4	14 October 2014	National Stadium, Warsaw, Poland	12	Scotland	2–2	2–2	UEFA Euro 2016 qualification
5	14 November 2014	Boris Paichadze Dinamo Arena, Tbilisi, Georgia	13	Georgia	4–0	4–0	UEFA Euro 2016 qualification
6	18 November 2014	Stadion Miejski, Wrocław, Poland	14	Switzerland	2–1	2–2	Friendly
7	13 June 2015	National Stadium, Warsaw, Poland	16	Georgia	1–0	4–0	UEFA Euro 2016 qualification
8	7 September 2015	National Stadium, Warsaw, Poland	19	Gibraltar	5–0	8–1	UEFA Euro 2016 qualification
9	7 September 2015	National Stadium, Warsaw, Poland	19	Gibraltar	7–0	8–1	UEFA Euro 2016 qualification
10	17 November 2015	Stadion Miejski, Wrocław, Poland	22	Czech Republic	1–0	3–1	Friendly
11	12 June 2016	Stade de Nice, Nice, France	27	Northern Ireland	1–0	1–0	UEFA Euro 2016
12	4 September 2017	National Stadium, Warsaw, Poland	36	Kazakhstan	1–0	3–0	2018 FIFA World Cup qualification
13	20 November 2018	Estádio D. Afonso Henriques, Guimarães, Portugal	45	Portugal	1–1	1–1	2018–19 UEFA Nations League A
14	13 October 2019	National Stadium, Warsaw, Poland	49	North Macedonia	2–0	2–0	UEFA Euro 2020 qualification
15	7 October 2020	Stadion Energa, Gdańsk, Poland	52	Finland	5–1	5–1	Friendly
16	12 November 2021	Estadi Nacional, Andorra La Vella, Andorra	60	Andorra	3–1	4–1	2022 FIFA World Cup qualification
17	20 June 2023	Zimbru Stadium, Chișinău, Moldova	69	Moldova	1–0	2–3	UEFA Euro 2024 qualification

== Honours ==
Napoli

- Coppa Italia: 2019–20

Juventus

- Coppa Italia: 2023–24

Individual

- Polish Newcomer of the Year: 2012
- Ekstraklasa Player of the Month: August 2012
- KNVB Cup top goalscorer: 2014–15 (8 goals)
- Coppa Italia top goalscorer: 2023–24 (4 goals)
