= 2014–15 AFC Ajax season =

Dutch football club season

Ajax
2014–15 season
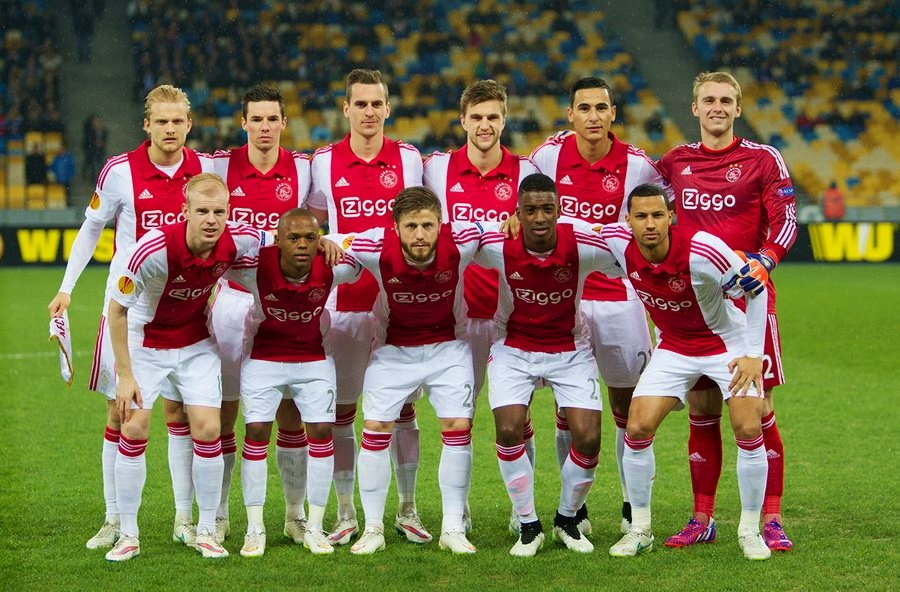
- Ajax lining up for the match against Dnipro on 12 March 2015
- Chairman: Hennie Henrichs
- Manager: Frank de Boer
- Eredivisie: 2nd
- KNVB Cup: Fourth round
- UEFA Champions League: Group stage
- UEFA Europa League: Round of 16
- Johan Cruyff Shield: Runners-up
- Top goalscorer: League: Arkadiusz Milik (11); All: Arkadiusz Milik (23)
Home colours	Away colours	Third colours

During the 2014–15 season, AFC Ajax participated in the Eredivisie, the KNVB Cup, the UEFA Champions League and the UEFA Europa League. The first training took place on Tuesday 24 June 2014. The traditional AFC Ajax Open Day was held on 3 August 2014.

== Pre-season ==
The first training for the 2014–15 season was held on 25 June 2014. In preparation for the new season Ajax organized a training stage in Neustift, Austria. The squad from manager Frank de Boer stayed there from 15 June 2013 to 24 June 2013. During this training stage a friendly match was played against SDC Putten. The club then traveled to Stubaital, Austria, for additional training. The squad stayed there from 30 June to 5 July. Further friendly matches were played against Wacker Innsbruck in Austria. Returning to the Netherlands, further friendly matches were scheduled against Aalborg BK Lyon and Real Sociedad.

== Player statistics ==
Appearances for competitive matches only

No.	Pos	Nat	Player	Total		Eredivisie		UEFA Champions League UEFA Europa League		KNVB Cup Johan Cruijff-schaal XVIII	
No.	Pos	Nat	Player	Apps	Goals	Apps	Goals	Apps	Goals	Apps	Goals
1	GK	(Netherlands) NED	Jasper Cillessen	42	0	32	0	10	0	0	0
2	DF	(Netherlands) NED	Ricardo van Rhijn	40	2	28	2	10	0	2	0
3	DF	(Netherlands) NED	Joël Veltman	33	4	25	4	7	0	1	0
4	DF	(Finland) FIN	Niklas Moisander	31	0	25	0	5	0	1	0
5	DF	(Denmark) DEN	Nicolai Boilesen	31	0	22	0	8	0	1	0
6	DF	(Netherlands) NED	Mike van der Hoorn	22	2	9+6	2	2+2	0	3	0
7	FW	(Denmark) DEN	Viktor Fischer	4	3	3+1	3	0	0	0	0
8	MF	(Netherlands) NED	Daley Sinkgraven	14	0	9+1	0	1+3	0	0	0
9	FW	(Iceland) ISL	Kolbeinn Sigþórsson	27	7	13+8	7	4+1	0	0+1	0
10	MF	(Netherlands) NED	Davy Klaassen	44	8	30	6	10	2	4	0
11	FW	(Netherlands) NED	Ricardo Kishna								
12	DF	(Netherlands) NED	Jaïro Riedewald	25	0	10+9	0	0+4	0	2	0
16	MF	(Denmark) DEN	Lucas Andersen	37	4	19+8	2	6+1	1	2+1	1
18	FW	(Croatia) CRO	Robert Murić	0	0	0	0	0	0	0	0
19	FW	(Poland) POL	Arkadiusz Milik	34	23	14+7	11	6+3	4	4	8
20	FW	(Denmark) DEN	Lasse Schöne	38	11	26+3	8	7+1	3	1	0
21	FW	(Netherlands) NED	Anwar El Ghazi	43	10	23+8	9	5+4	1	1+2	0
23	DF	(Netherlands) NED	Kenny Tete	5	0	4+1	0	0	0	0	0
24	GK	(Cameroon) CMR	André Onana	0	0	0	0	0	0	0	0
25	MF	(South Africa) RSA	Thulani Serero	41	1	22+7	1	8+1	0	1+2	0
26	MF	(Netherlands) NED	Nick Viergever	39	3	21+5	2	8+1	1	4	0
27	MF	(Netherlands) NED	Riechedly Bazoer	22	2	14+3	1	4	1	1	0
30	FW	(Netherlands) NED	Richairo Zivkovic	10	2	0+7	1	0+2	0	0+1	1
31	GK	(Netherlands) NED	Peter Leeuwenburgh	0	0	0	0	0	0	0	0
32	MF	(Denmark) DEN	Niki Zimling	12	0	2+7	0	1+2	0	0	0
33	GK	(Netherlands) NED	Diederik Boer	4	0	1	0	0	0	3	0
34	FW	(Netherlands) NED	Queensy Menig	5	1	0+3	0	0	0	1+1	1
35	MF	(Netherlands) NED	Fabian Sporkslede	0	0	0	0	0	0	0	0
37	MF	(Netherlands) NED	Donny van de Beek	0	0	0	0	0	0	0	0
Players sold or loaned out after the start of the season:
1	GK	(Netherlands) NED	Kenneth Vermeer	2	0	1	0	0	0	1	0
8	MF	(Netherlands) NED	Lerin Duarte	6	1	0+4	0	0	0	2	1
17	MF	(Netherlands) NED	Daley Blind	3	0	2+1	0	0	0	0	0
24	DF	(Netherlands) NED	Stefano Denswil	6	0	1	0	1+1	0	3	0
28	MF	(Sweden) SWE	Tobias Sana	0	0	0	0	0	0	0	0
29	DF	(Netherlands) NED	Ruben Ligeon	7	0	2+1	0	0	0	2+2	0

Updated 17 May 2015

=== 2014–15 selection by nationality ===
Nationality	(Netherlands)	(Denmark)	(Croatia)	(Finland)	(Iceland)	(Poland)	(South Africa)	(Cameroon)	(Germany)	(Serbia)	(Turkey)	Total Players
Current squad selection	18	5	1	1	1	1	1	-	-	-	-	27
Youth/reserves squad in AFC Ajax selection	19	1	-	-	-	-	-	1	1	1	1	24
Players out on loan	6	-	-	-	-	-	-	-	-	-	-	6

== Team statistics ==
=== Eredivisie standings 2014–15 ===
Current standing	Matches played	Wins	Draws	Losses	Points	Goals for	Goals against	Yellow cards (yellow card)	Red cards (red card)
2	34	21	8	5	71	68	29	37	1

==== Points by match day ====
Match day	1	2	3	4	5	6	7	8	9	10	11	12	13	14	15	16	17	18	19	20	21	22	23	24	25	26	27	28	29	30	31	32	33	34	Total
Points	3	3	0	0	3	3	3	1	1	3	3	3	3	1	3	3	3	3	1	0	0	3	3	1	3	3	3	3	1	3	1	1	3	0	71

==== Total points by match day ====
Match day	1	2	3	4	5	6	7	8	9	10	11	12	13	14	15	16	17	18	19	20	21	22	23	24	25	26	27	28	29	30	31	32	33	34	Total
Points	3	6	6	6	9	12	15	16	17	20	23	26	29	30	33	36	39	42	43	43	43	46	49	50	53	56	59	62	63	66	67	68	71	71	71

==== Standing by match day ====
Match day	1	2	3	4	5	6	7	8	9	10	11	12	13	14	15	16	17	18	19	20	21	22	23	24	25	26	27	28	29	30	31	32	33	34	Standing
Standing	1	2	3	7	5	2	2	2	2	2	2	2	2	2	2	2	2	2	2	2	2	2	2	2	2	2	2	2	2	2	2	2	2	2	2

==== Goals by match day ====
Match day	1	2	3	4	5	6	7	8	9	10	11	12	13	14	15	16	17	18	19	20	21	22	23	24	25	26	27	28	29	30	31	32	33	34	Total
Goals	4	3	1	0	2	1	5	0	1	3	4	4	4	1	5	3	2	1	0	0	0	2	4	1	3	1	4	1	1	2	0	1	3	1	68

=== Statistics for the 2014–15 season ===
- This is an overview of all the statistics for played matches in the 2014–15 season.

	Friendlies	Johan Cruijff Schaal	KNVB Cup	UEFA Champions League	UEFA Europa League	Eredivisie	Total
Matches	10 of 10	1 of 1	3 of 3	6 of 6	4 of 4	34 of 34	60 of 60
Win	8 of 10	0 of 1	2 of 3	1 of 6	3 of 4	21 of 34	35 of 60
Draw	2 of 10	0 of 1	0 of 2	2 of 6	0 of 4	8 of 34	12 of 60
Loss	0 of 10	1 of 1	1 of 3	3 of 6	1 of 4	5 of 34	11 of 60
Home	4 of 10	1 of 1	1 of 3	3 of 3	2 of 2	17 of 17	28 of 36
Away	6 of 10	0 of 0	2 of 3	3 of 3	2 of 2	17 of 17	26 of 26
Yellow cards (yellow card)	2	1	0	17	4	37	61
Red cards (red card)	0	0	0	0	1	1	2
2 x yellow in 1 match (yellow card) (yellow-red card)	0	0	0	1	0	0	1
Number of substitutes used (substituted on) (substituted off)	59	3	7	17	12	100	194
Goals for	35	0	13	8	6	68	129
Goals against	5	1	4	10	2	29	51
Balance	+30	-1	+9	-2	+4	+40	+82
Clean sheets	3	0	2	1	2	12	20
Penalties for	0	0	1	1	0	2	4
Penalties against	1	0	0	1	0	1	3

=== 2014–15 Team records ===
Description	Competition	Result
Biggest win	(Netherlands) Friendly match	AFC Ajax – SDC Putten ( 13–1 )
Biggest win	(Netherlands) Johan Cruijff Schaal	—
Biggest win	(Netherlands) KNVB Cup	JOS Watergraafsmeer – AFC Ajax ( 0–9 )
Biggest win	(Europe) UEFA Champions League	AFC Ajax – APOEL FC ( 4–0 )
Biggest win	(Europe) UEFA Europa League	Legia Warszawa – AFC Ajax ( 0–3 )
Biggest win	(Netherlands) Eredivisie	AFC Ajax – Willem II ( 5–0 )
Biggest loss	(Netherlands) Friendly match	—
Biggest loss	(Netherlands) Johan Cruijff Schaal	PEC Zwolle – AFC Ajax ( 1–0 )
Biggest loss	(Netherlands) KNVB Cup	AFC Ajax – Vitesse ( 0–4 )
Biggest loss	(Europe) UEFA Champions League	FC Barcelona – AFC Ajax ( 3–1 ) Paris Saint-Germain – AFC Ajax ( 3–1 )
Biggest loss	(Europe) UEFA Europa League	Dnipro Dnipropetrovsk – AFC Ajax ( 1–0 )
Biggest loss	(Netherlands) Eredivisie	AFC Ajax – PSV ( 1–3 )
Most goals in a match	(Netherlands) Friendly match	AFC Ajax – SDC Putten ( 13–1 )
Most goals in a match	(Netherlands) Johan Cruijff Schaal	PEC Zwolle – AFC Ajax ( 1–0 )
Most goals in a match	(Netherlands) KNVB Cup	JOS Watergraafsmeer – AFC Ajax ( 0–9 )
Most goals in a match	(Europe) UEFA Champions League	AFC Ajax – APOEL FC ( 4–0 )
Most goals in a match	(Europe) UEFA Europa League	Legia Warszawa – AFC Ajax ( 0–3 )
Most goals in a match	(Netherlands) Eredivisie	AFC Ajax – Willem II ( 5–0 )

==== Topscorers ====
Friendlies

Nr.	Name	Goal
1.	(Netherlands) Anwar El Ghazi	9
2.	(Iceland) Kolbeinn Sigþórsson	4
2.	(Poland) Arkadiusz Milik	4
4.	(Netherlands) Ruben Ligeon	3
5.	(Netherlands) Danny Bakker	2
5.	(Sweden) Tobias Sana	2
7.	(Netherlands) Nick Viergever	1
7.	(Denmark) Lucas Andersen	1
7.	(Netherlands) Sheraldo Becker	1
7.	(Netherlands) Siem de Jong	1
7.	(Netherlands) Damon Mirani	1
7.	(Netherlands) Abdel Malek El Hasnaoui	1
7.	(Netherlands) Davy Klaassen	1
7.	(Netherlands) Lerin Duarte	1
7.	(Netherlands) Richairo Zivkovic	1
7.	(South Africa) Thulani Serero	1
7.	(Denmark) Lasse Schöne	1
7.	(Netherlands) Lesley de Sa	1
7.	(Netherlands) Queensy Menig	1
7.	(Denmark) Niki Zimling	1
Own goal	(Spain) Carlos Martínez (Real Sociedad)	1
Total		38

Johan Cruijff Schaal

Nr.	Name	Goal
1.	–	-
Total		0

Eredivisie

Nr.	Name	Goal
1.	(Poland) Arkadiusz Milik	11
2.	(Netherlands) Anwar El Ghazi	9
3.	(Denmark) Lasse Schöne	8
4.	(Iceland) Kolbeinn Sigþórsson	7
5.	(Netherlands) Davy Klaassen	6
6.	(Netherlands) Ricardo Kishna	5
7.	(Netherlands) Joël Veltman	4
8.	(Denmark) Viktor Fischer	3
9.	(Netherlands) Nick Viergever	2
9.	(Netherlands) Mike van der Hoorn	2
9.	(Netherlands) Ricardo van Rhijn	2
9.	(Denmark) Lucas Andersen	2
13.	(South Africa) Thulani Serero	1
13.	(Netherlands) Richairo Zivkovic	1
13.	(Netherlands) Riechedly Bazoer	1
Own goal	(Netherlands) Daley Sinkgraven (Heerenveen)	1
Own goal	(Netherlands) Johan Kappelhof (Groningen)	1
Own goal	(Netherlands) Wesley Verhoek (Go Ahead Eagles)	1
Own goal	(Netherlands) Xander Houtkoop (ADO Den Haag)	1
Own goal	(Netherlands) Ramon Leeuwin (Utrecht)	1
Total		68

KNVB Cup

Nr.	Name	Goal
1.	(Poland) Arkadiusz Milik	8
2.	(Denmark) Lucas Andersen	1
2.	(Netherlands) Ricardo Kishna	1
2.	(Netherlands) Queensy Menig	1
2.	(Netherlands) Lerin Duarte	1
2.	(Netherlands) Richairo Zivkovic	1
Total		13

UEFA Champions League

Nr.	Name	Goal
1.	(Denmark) Lasse Schöne	3
2.	(Netherlands) Davy Klaassen	2
3.	(Denmark) Lucas Andersen	1
3.	(Netherlands) Anwar El Ghazi	1
3.	(Poland) Arkadiusz Milik	1
Total		8

UEFA Europa League

Nr.	Name	Goal
1.	(Poland) Arkadiusz Milik	3
2.	(Netherlands) Nick Viergever	1
2.	(Netherlands) Riechedly Bazoer	1
2.	(Netherlands) Mike van der Hoorn	1
Total		6

Eusébio Cup

Nr.	Name	Goal
1.	(Netherlands) Ricardo Kishna	1
Total		1

== Placements ==
	Friendlies	Eusébio Cup	Johan Cruijff Schaal	KNVB Cup	UEFA Champions League	UEFA Europa League	Eredivisie
Status	10 played, 8 wins, 2 draws, 0 losses	Winners; Last opponent: Benfica	Runners-up; Last opponent: PEC Zwolle	4th Round; Last opponent: Vitesse	3rd place in Group F Placement for: UEFA Europa League	Round of 16; Last opponent: Dnipro Dnipropetrovsk	2nd place, 71 points in 34 matches

- Jasper Cillessen is voted Player of the year by the supporters of AFC Ajax.
- Anwar El Ghazi is voted Talent of the year by the supporters of AFC Ajax.
- Arkadiusz Milik finishes as topscorer of the KNVB Cup with 8 goals in 3 matches.

== Competitions ==
=== Johan Cruyff Shield ===
3 August 2014	PEC Zwolle	1–0	Ajax	Amsterdam
20:45 CET	Van Polen (yellow card) 52'; Rienstra (yellow card) 54'; Nijland 55'; Van Hintum (yellow card) 83'	Report	Moisander (yellow card) 45+1'	Stadium: Amsterdam Arena; Attendance: 42,000; Referee: Danny Makkelie

=== Eredivisie ===
==== League table ====
Pos	Team	Pld	W	D	L	GF	GA	GD	Pts	Qualification or relegation
1	PSV (C)	34	29	1	4	92	31	+61	88	Qualification for the Champions League group stage
2	Ajax	34	21	8	5	69	29	+40	71	Qualification for the Champions League third qualifying round
3	AZ	34	19	5	10	63	56	+7	62	Qualification for the Europa League third qualifying round
4	Feyenoord	34	17	8	9	56	39	+17	59	Qualification for the European competition play-offs
5	Vitesse (O)	34	16	10	8	66	43	+23	58	Qualification for the European competition play-offs

Source: NUsport
Rules for classification: 1) points; 2) goal difference; 3) number of goals scored
(C) Champions; (O) Play-off winners

==== Matches ====
10 August 2014 1	Ajax	4–1	Vitesse	Amsterdam
14:30 CEST	Viergever 40'; Ligeon (yellow card) 43'; Schöne 48', 87'; Van der Hoorn 62', (yellow card) 82'	Report	Wallace (yellow card) 47'; Vejinović 84'	Stadium: Amsterdam Arena; Attendance: 48,494; Referee: Pol van Boekel

17 August 2014 2	AZ	1–3	Ajax	Alkmaar
14:30 CEST	Berghuis 50'; Wuytens (yellow card) 75'; Hupperts (yellow card) 90+3'; Gouweleeuw (yellow card) 90+3'	Report	Klaassen 15'; Sigþórsson (yellow card) 37'; Schöne 69'; El Ghazi 90'; Moisander (yellow card) 90+4'	Stadium: AFAS Stadion; Attendance: 16,011; Referee: Kevin Blom

24 August 2014 3	Ajax	1–3	PSV	Amsterdam
14:30 CEST	El Ghazi 16'	Report	Rekik (yellow card) 12'; Depay 52', (yellow card) 61'; Narsingh 63'; Jozefzoon 86'	Stadium: Amsterdam Arena; Attendance: 51,513; Referee: Björn Kuipers

31 August 2014 4	Groningen	2–0	Ajax	Groningen
14:30 CEST	Botteghin 48'; De Leeuw 87'	Report	Boilesen (yellow card) 36'	Stadium: Euroborg; Attendance: 21,740; Referee: Bas Nijhuis

13 September 2014 5	Ajax	2–1	Heracles	Amsterdam
18:30 CEST	Milik 3', 45+1', (yellow card) 74'; Duarte (yellow card) 90+3'	Report	Weghorst 86'; Wierik (yellow card) 87'	Stadium: Amsterdam Arena; Attendance: 47,408; Referee: Richard Liesveld

21 September 2014 6	Feyenoord	0–1	Ajax	Rotterdam
14:30 CEST		Report	Van Rhijn 4'; Viergever (yellow card) 73'	Stadium: De Kuip; Attendance: 47,000; Referee: Kevin Blom

27 September 2014 7	NAC Breda	2–5	Ajax	Breda
14:30 CEST	Amieux (yellow card) 53'; De Kamps (yellow card) 55'; Perica 60', 76'	Report	Van Rhijn 27'; Sigþórsson 29', 38', 89'; Veltman 65'	Stadium: Rat Verlegh Stadion; Attendance: 18,900; Referee: Reinold Wiedemeijer

5 October 2014 8	Ajax	0–0	PEC Zwolle	Amsterdam
16:45 CEST	Zimling (yellow card) 40'; Klaassen (yellow card) 70'	Report	Thomas (yellow card) 32'; Rienstra (yellow card) 35'	Stadium: Amsterdam Arena; Attendance: 49,892; Referee: Bas Nijhuis

18 October 2014 9	Twente	1–1	Ajax	Enschede
20:45 CEST	Corona 17'; Castaignos (yellow card) 56'	Report	Veltman (yellow card) 56'; Sigþórsson 71'	Stadium: De Grolsch Veste; Attendance: 30,000; Referee: Pol van Boekel

25 October 2014 10	Ajax	3–1	Go Ahead Eagles	Amsterdam
20:45 CEST	El Ghazi 10'; Milik 55'; Schöne 75'	Report	Lewis 28'	Stadium: Amsterdam Arena; Attendance: 49,446; Referee: Pieter Vink

1 November 2014 11	Ajax	4–0	Dordrecht	Amsterdam
18:30 CEST	Schöne 21', 65'; Veltman 69'; Andersen 75'	Report	Lieder (yellow card) 8'; Lima (yellow card) 16' (yellow-red card) 62'; Haddad (yellow card) 18'; Ojo (yellow card) 63'	Stadium: Amsterdam Arena; Attendance: 50,760; Referee: Ed Janssen

9 November 2014 12	Cambuur	2–4	Ajax	Leeuwarden
12:30 CEST	Steblecki 2'; Ogbeche 90+4' (pen.)	Report	Milik 19', 60'; Klaassen 23'; El Ghazi 78'	Stadium: Cambuur Stadion; Attendance: 10,000; Referee: Danny Makkelie

22 November 2014 13	Ajax	4–1	Heerenveen	Amsterdam
20:45 CEST	Sinkgraven 66' (o.g.); El Ghazi 72'; Kishna 73', (yellow card) 74'; Milik 84' (pen.)	Report	Slagveer 18', (yellow card) 32' (yellow-red card) 43'; Van den Berg (yellow card) 32'; Otigba (yellow card) 83'	Stadium: Amsterdam Arena; Attendance: 50,946; Referee: Kevin Blom

30 November 2014 14	ADO Den Haag	1–1	Ajax	The Hague
12:30 CET	Kramer (yellow card) 21', (goal) 85'; Wormgoor (yellow card) 44'; Zuiverloon (yellow card) 80' (yellow-red card) 90+5'; Jansen (yellow card) 90+5'	Report	Klaassen 8', (yellow card) 32'; Viergever (yellow card) 90+5'	Stadium: Kyocera Stadion; Attendance: 14,657; Referee: Serdar Gözübüyük

6 December 2014 15	Ajax	5–0	Willem II	Amsterdam
20:45 CET	Sigþórsson 14'; Milik 27', 43'; Veltman 31'; Klaassen 57'	Report	Messaoud (yellow card) 15'; Dijks (yellow card) 35'; Wuytens (yellow card) 44'; Ippel (yellow card) 83'	Stadium: Amsterdam Arena; Attendance: 50,455; Referee: Björn Kuipers

14 December 2014 16	Ajax	3–1	Utrecht	Amsterdam
12:30 CET	Serero 16'; Klaassen 20'; El Ghazi 65'	Report	Rubin 35'; Oar (yellow card) 40'; Janssen (yellow card) 90'	Stadium: Amsterdam Arena; Attendance: 48,007; Referee: Pol van Boekel

21 December 2014 17	Excelsior	0–2	Ajax	Rotterdam
14:30 CET	Auassar (yellow card) 35'	Report	Van Rhijn (yellow card) 75'; Van der Hoorn 83'; Serero (yellow card) 87'; Zivkovic 88'	Stadium: Stadion Woudestein; Attendance: 3,600; Referee: Tom van Sichem

16 January 2015 18	Ajax	2–0	Groningen	Amsterdam
20:00 CET	Kishna 15'; Kappelhof 90' (o.g.)	Report	Hateboer (yellow card) 81'	Stadium: Amsterdam Arena; Attendance: 50,441; Referee: Reinold Wiedemeijer

25 January 2015 19	Ajax	0–0	Feyenoord	Amsterdam
12:30 CET		Report	Kongolo (yellow card) 66'; Boëtius (yellow card) 72'	Stadium: Amsterdam Arena; Attendance: 52,472; Referee: Bas Nijhuis

1 February 2015 20	Vitesse	1–0	Ajax	Arnhem
14:30	Đurđević 85'	Report		Stadium: GelreDome; Attendance: 20,384; Referee: Pieter Vink

5 February 2015 21	Ajax	0–1	AZ	Amsterdam
20:45	Moisander (red card) 61'	Report	Berghuis (yellow card) 43'; Jóhannsson 76'	Stadium: Amsterdam Arena; Attendance: 47,724; Referee: Pol van Boekel

8 February 2015 22	Go Ahead Eagles	1–2	Ajax	Deventer
14:30	Sander Duits (yellow card) 44'; Plet (yellow card) 62'; Overgoor 76'	Report	El Ghazi 24'; Verhoek 88' (o.g.); Bazoer (yellow card) 51'; Boilesen (yellow card) 55'; Sinkgraven (yellow card) 90+1'	Stadium: De Adelaarshorst; Attendance: 8,004; Referee: Björn Kuipers

15 February 2015 23	Ajax	4–2	Twente	Amsterdam
16:45	Viergever 10'; Bazoer 15'; Kishna 68', 75'	Report	Corona 6'; Bjelland (yellow card) 39'; Ziyech 50'	Stadium: Amsterdam Arena; Attendance: 49,874; Referee: Serdar Gözübüyük

22 February 2015 24	Willem II	1–1	Ajax	Tilburg
12:30	Messaoud 52'	Report	El Ghazi (yellow card) 35'; Milik 37', (yellow card) 90+4'; Klaassen (yellow card) 57'; Viergever (yellow card) 73'	Stadium: Koning Willem II Stadion; Attendance: 14,500; Referee: Kevin Blom

1 March 2015 25	PSV	1–3	Ajax	Eindhoven
16:45	De Jong 77'; Arias (yellow card) 90+2'	Report	Kishna 29'; Viergever (yellow card) 45+1'; El Ghazi (yellow card) 72', (goal) 90+1'; Schöne 83'	Stadium: Philips Stadion; Attendance: 35,000; Referee: Danny Makkelie

8 March 2015 26	Ajax	1–0	Excelsior	Amsterdam
14:30	Viergever (yellow card) 59'; El Ghazi 83'	Report		Stadium: Amsterdam Arena; Attendance: 39,943; Referee: Dennis Higler

15 March 2015 27	Heerenveen	1–4	Ajax	Heerenveen
14:30	Veltman 35' (o.g.); Van Aken (yellow card) 63'; Van Aanholt (red card) 78'	Report	Milik 6', 67'; Klaassen 11'; Veltman 38'	Stadium: Abe Lenstra Stadion; Attendance: 27,224; Referee: Bas Nijhuis

22 March 2015 28	Ajax	1–0	ADO Den Haag	Amsterdam
12:30	Serero (yellow card) 54'; Milik (yellow card) 84'; Houtkoop 80' (o.g.)	Report	Derijck (yellow card) 31'; Yakovenko (yellow card) 45'; Van Duinen (yellow card) 80'	Stadium: Amsterdam Arena; Attendance: 49,743; Referee: Richard Liesveld

5 April 2015 29	Utrecht	1–1	Ajax	Utrecht
12:30	Diemers (yellow card) 53'; Markiet 85'	Report	Leeuwin 51' (o.g.), (red card) 87'; Bazoer (yellow card) 65'; Veltman (yellow card) 79'	Stadium: Stadion Galgenwaard; Attendance: 19,000; Referee: Pol van Boekel

11 April 2015 30	Heracles	0–2	Ajax	Almelo
20:45		Report	Sigþórsson 45+2'; Andersen 86'	Stadium: Polman Stadion; Attendance: 8,431; Referee: Kevin Blom

19 April 2015 31	Ajax	0–0	NAC Breda	Amsterdam
14:30		Report	Ten Rouwelaar (yellow card) 70'; Swerts (red card) 90+1'	Stadium: Amsterdam Arena; Attendance: 51,596; Referee: Björn Kuipers

26 April 2015 32	PEC Zwolle	1–1	Ajax	Zwolle
14:30	Drost (yellow card) 6', (goal) 48'	Report	Andersen (yellow card) 33'; Veltman (yellow card) 40'; Sigþórsson 89'	Stadium: IJsseldelta Stadion; Attendance: 12,500; Referee: Eric Braamhaar

10 May 2015 33	Ajax	3–0	Cambuur	Amsterdam
14:30	Fischer 57', 62'; Schöne 83'	Report	De Ridder (yellow card) 21'; El Makrini (yellow card) 33'; Pereira (yellow card) 82'	Stadium: Amsterdam Arena; Attendance: 51,140; Referee: Jochem Kamphuis

17 May 2015 34	Dordrecht	2–1	Ajax	Dordrecht
14:30	Klaiber 70'; Haddad (yellow card) 82'; Van Haaren 90+1'	Report	Fischer 57'; Riedewald (yellow card) 89'	Stadium: GN Bouw Stadion; Attendance: 4,103; Referee: Pol van Boekel

=== KNVB Cup ===
24 September 2014 Second round	JOS Watergraafsmeer	0–9	Ajax	Amsterdam
18:30 CEST		Report	Milik 22', 26', 62', 82', 87', 88'; Andersen 24'; Kishna 64'; Menig 70'	Stadium: Olympic Stadium

28 October 2014 Third round	SV Urk	0–4	Ajax	Urk
19:30 CEST		Report	Duarte 34'; Milik 37' (pen.), 40'; Zivkovic 86'	Stadium: Sportpark De Vormt

19 December 2014 Fourth round	Ajax	0–4	Vitesse	Amsterdam
20:45 CEST		Report	Traoré 22', 57'; Labyad 45+1'; Kazaishvili 60'; Achenteh (yellow card) 65'	Stadium: Amsterdam Arena; Attendance: 35,853; Referee: Bas Nijhuis

=== UEFA Champions League ===
==== Group stage ====
Pos	Team	Pld	W	D	L	GF	GA	GD	Pts	Qualification	BAR	PAR	AJX	APO
1	(Spain) Barcelona	6	5	0	1	15	5	+10	15	Advance to knockout phase	—	3–1	3–1	1–0
2	(France) Paris Saint-Germain	6	4	1	1	10	7	+3	13	Advance to knockout phase	3–2	—	3–1	1–0
3	(Netherlands) Ajax	6	1	2	3	8	10	−2	5	Transfer to Europa League	0–2	1–1	—	4–0
4	(Cyprus) APOEL	6	0	1	5	1	12	−11	1		0–4	0–1	1–1	—

Source: UEFA
Rules for classification: Group stage tiebreakers

17 September 2014 1	Ajax (Netherlands)	1–1	(France) Paris Saint-Germain	Amsterdam, Netherlands
20:45 CEST (UTC+02:00)	Klaassen (yellow card) 30'; Veltman (yellow card) 56'; El Ghazi (yellow card) 68'; Serero (yellow card) 69'; Schöne 74'	Report	Cavani 14'; Marquinhos (yellow card) 72'	Stadium: Amsterdam Arena; Attendance: 50,430; Referee: Wolfgang Stark (Germany)

30 September 2014 2	APOEL (Cyprus)	1–1	(Netherlands) Ajax	Nicosia, Cyprus
20:45 CEST (UTC+02:00)	Manduca 31' (pen.); João Guilherme (yellow card) 81'; Aloneftis (yellow card) 89'	Report	Andersen 28'; Moisander (yellow card) 36'; Viergever (yellow card) 48'; Cillessen (yellow card) 56'; Sigþórsson (yellow card) 90'	Stadium: GSP Stadium; Attendance: 17,190; Referee: Milorad Mažić (Serbia)

21 October 2014 3	Barcelona (Spain)	3–1	(Netherlands) Ajax	Barcelona, Spain
20:45 CEST (UTC+02:00)	Neymar 7'; Messi 24'; Pedro (yellow card) 80'; Sandro 90+4'	Report	Veltman (yellow card) 32'; Van Rhijn (yellow card) 69'; El Ghazi 88'; Riedewald (yellow card) 90'	Stadium: Camp Nou; Referee: William Collum (Scotland)

5 November 2014 4	Ajax (Netherlands)	0–2	(Spain) Barcelona	Amsterdam, Netherlands
20:45 CET (UTC+01:00)	El Ghazi (yellow card) 9'; Veltman (yellow card) 34' (yellow-red card) 71'; Moisander (yellow card) 40'	Report	Mascherano (yellow card) 8'; Messi 36', 76'; Alba (yellow card) 42'; Alves (yellow card) 45'	Stadium: Amsterdam Arena; Attendance: 52,117; Referee: Pedro Proença (Portugal)

25 November 2014 5	Paris Saint-Germain (France)	3–1	(Netherlands) Ajax	Paris, France
20:45 CET (UTC+01:00)	Cavani 33', 83'; Ibrahimović (yellow card) 38', (goal) 78'	Report	Klaassen (yellow card) 18', (goal) 67'	Stadium: Parc des Princes; Attendance: 46,130; Referee: Matej Jug (Slovenia)

10 December 2014 6	Ajax (Netherlands)	4–0	(Cyprus) APOEL	Amsterdam, Netherlands
20:45 CET (UTC+01:00)	Schöne 45' (pen.), 50'; Klaassen 53'; Milik 74'	Report	Antoniades (yellow card) 45'; Vinícius (yellow card) 47'	Stadium: Amsterdam Arena; Referee: Carlos Velasco Carballo (Spain)

=== UEFA Europa League ===
==== Knockout phase ====
===== Round of 32 =====
19 February 2015 First leg	Ajax (Netherlands)	1–0	(Poland) Legia Warszawa	Amsterdam, Netherlands
18:00 CET	Milik 34'; Bazoer (yellow card) 45'	Report	Jodłowiec (yellow card) 36'; Vrdoljak (yellow card) 90+1'	Stadium: Amsterdam Arena; Attendance: 46,761; Referee: Eriksson (Sweden)

26 February 2015 Second leg	Legia Warszawa (Poland)	0–3 (0–4 agg.)	(Netherlands) Ajax	Warsaw, Poland
20:00 CET	Vrdoljak (yellow card) 18'; Guilherme (yellow card) 21'; Sá (yellow card) 24'; Żyro (yellow card) 39'; Rzezniczak (yellow card) 63'	Report	Milik 11', 43'; Viergever 13'	Stadium: Polish Army Stadium; Attendance: 1,000 (away supporters only); Referee: David Fernández Borbalán (Spain)

===== Round of 16 =====
12 March 2015 First leg	Dnipro Dnipropetrovsk (Ukraine)	1–0	(Netherlands) Ajax	Kyiv, Ukraine
18:00 CET	Zozulya 30', (yellow card) 88'; Fedetskiy (yellow card) 48'; Rotan (yellow card) 51'; Shakhov (yellow card) 89'	Report	Boilesen (yellow card) 23'; Bazoer (yellow card) 50'	Stadium: NSC Olimpiyskiy Stadium; Attendance: 10,581; Referee: Ivan Bebek (Croatia)

19 March 2015 Second leg	Ajax (Netherlands)	2–1 (a.e.t.) (2–2 agg.)	(Ukraine) Dnipro Dnipropetrovsk	Amsterdam, Netherlands
20:00 CET	Bazoer 60'; Kishna (yellow card) 70'; Van der Hoorn 117', (red card) 120+4'	Report	Matos (yellow card) 21'; Bezus (yellow card) 80'; Shakov (yellow card) 87'; Konoplyanka 97'; Boyko (yellow card) 120'	Stadium: Amsterdam Arena; Referee: Aliaksei Kulbakov (Belarus)

- Dnipro Dnipropetrovsk advance to the quarter-finals based on away goal rule.

=== Friendlies ===
28 June 2014	Ajax (Netherlands)	13–1	(Netherlands) SDC Putten	Amsterdam, Netherlands
14:00	Viergever 10'; Andersen 33'; Becker 39'; Milik 41'; De Jong 42'; El Ghazi 48', 51', 81'; Mirani 50'; El Hasnaoui 59'; Ligeon 78'; Sigþórsson 85'; Sana 87'	Report	Ozan 82'	Stadium: Amsterdam Arena

5 July 2014	Wacker Innsbruck (Austria)	1–5	(Netherlands) Ajax	Schwaz, Austria
	Hirschhofer 4'	Report	Ligeon 2'; Klaassen 7'; Duarte 13'; Milik 30'; Zivkovic 46'	Stadium: Sportzentrum Schwaz

12 July 2014	Ajax (Netherlands)	6–0	(Germany) SV Hönnepel-Niedermörmter	Zeist, Netherlands
11:00	Serero 32'; Sigþórsson 42', 57'; El Ghazi 78', 79'; Bakker 90'	Report

12 July 2014	Ajax (Netherlands)	2–2	(Denmark) Aalborg BK	Amsterdam, Netherlands
14:00	Schöne 36'; Bakker 75'	Report	Enevoldsen 20'; Heleniius 85' (pen.)	Stadium: Amsterdam Arena

12 July 2014	Ajax (Netherlands)	Cancelled^{1}	(France) Lyon	Amsterdam, Netherlands
14:30		Report		Stadium: Amsterdam Arena

19 July 2014	Ajax (Netherlands)	2–1	(Netherlands) Achilles '29	De Lutte, Netherlands
11:00	De Sa 7'; Sana 72'	Report	Hendriks 75'	Stadium: Sportcomplex De Lutte

19 July 2014	Ajax (Netherlands)	3–1	(Spain) Real Sociedad	Harderberg, Netherlands
19:30		Report		Stadium: De Boshoek

19 July 2014	Hannover 96 (Germany)	Cancelled^{1}	(Netherlands) Ajax	Minden, Germany
19:00		Report		Stadium: Weserstadion

26 July 2014	Benfica (Portugal)	0–1	(Netherlands) Ajax	Lisbon, Portugal
19:45		Report		Stadium: Estádio da Luz; Referee: Hugo Miguel

9 September 2014	Ajax (Netherlands)	1–1	(Netherlands) Cambuur	Amsterdam, Netherlands
14:00	Menig 10'	Report	Bakker 56' (pen.)	Stadium: Sportpark De Toekomst

10 January 2015	Ajax (Netherlands)	2–0	(Germany) Schalke 04	Doha, Qatar
17:30	Milik 65'; El Ghazi 90+3'	Report		Stadium: Grand Hamad Stadium

13 January 2015	Ajax (Netherlands)	6–0	(Netherlands) Jong SC Heerenveen	Amsterdam, Netherlands
14:30	Zimling 11'; El Ghazi 16', 73'; Sigþórsson 24'; Zivkovic 52'; Ligeon 68'	Report		Stadium: Sportpark De Toekomst

1. Both matches cancelled by their respective football associations due to potential hooliganism after the Vuurwerkincident from the previous season.

== Transfers for 2014–15 ==
=== Summer transfer window ===
For a list of all Dutch football transfers in the summer window (1 July 2014 to 31 August 2014) please see List of Dutch football transfers summer 2014.

==== Arrivals ====
- The following players moved to AFC Ajax.

	Name	Position	Transfer type	Previous club	Fee
	Return from loan spell				
Substituted on	(Netherlands) Mitchell Dijks	Defender	30 June 2014	(Netherlands) Heerenveen	-
Substituted on	(Netherlands) Danzell Gravenberch	Defender	30 June 2014	(Netherlands) NEC	-
Substituted on	(Netherlands) Ilan Boccara	Midfielder	30 June 2014	(France) Evian Thonon Gaillard	-
Substituted on	(Netherlands) Jody Lukoki	Forward	30 June 2014	(Netherlands) Cambuur	-
Substituted on	(Netherlands) Gino van Kessel	Forward	30 June 2014	(Slovakia) Trenčín	-
	Loan				
Substituted on	(Poland) Arkadiusz Milik	Forward	30 June 2014	(Germany) Bayer Leverkusen	-
Substituted on	(Denmark) Niki Zimling	Midfielder	1 September 2014	(Germany) Mainz 05	-
	Transfer				
Substituted on	(Netherlands) Richairo Zivkovic	Forward	9 March 2014	(Netherlands) Groningen	€2,500,000
Substituted on	(Netherlands) Nick Viergever	Defender	24 May 2014	(Netherlands) AZ	€2,000,000
Substituted on	(Netherlands) Diederik Boer	Goalkeeper	31 August 2014	(Netherlands) PEC Zwolle	€750,000
	Free Transfer				
Substituted on	(Sierra Leone) James Fofana	Defender	14 March 2014	(Netherlands) PSV	-
Substituted on	(Croatia) Robert Murić	Forward	18 June 2014	(Croatia) Dinamo Zagreb	-

==== Departures ====
- The following players moved from AFC Ajax.

	Name	Position	Transfer type	New club	Fee
	Out on loan				
Substituted off	(Netherlands) Mickey van der Hart	Goalkeeper	9 June 2014	(Netherlands) Go Ahead Eagles	-
Substituted off	(Serbia) Dejan Meleg	Forward	10 July 2014	(Netherlands) Cambuur	-
Substituted off	(Netherlands) Fabian Sporkslede	Midfielder	10 July 2014	(Netherlands) Willem II	-
Substituted off	(Netherlands) Lesley de Sa	Forward	22 July 2014	(Netherlands) Go Ahead Eagles	-
Substituted off	(Netherlands) Bas Kuipers	Defender	4 August 2014	(Netherlands) Excelsior	-
	Loan return				
Substituted off	(Spain) Bojan	Forward	30 June 2014	(Spain) Barcelona	-
Substituted off	(Slovakia) Stanislav Lobotka	Midfielder	30 June 2014	(Slovakia) Trenčín	-
	Transfer				
Substituted off	(Cameroon) Eyong Enoh	Midfielder	30 June 2014	(Turkey) Antalyaspor	€600,000
Substituted off	(Netherlands) Danny Hoesen	Forward	28 May 2014	(Netherlands) Groningen	€800,000
Substituted off	(Netherlands) Djavan Anderson	Midfielder	19 June 2014	(Netherlands) AZ	€200,000
Substituted off	(Netherlands) Javairô Dilrosun	Forward	30 June 2014	(England) Manchester City	€130,000
Substituted off	(Netherlands) Siem de Jong	Midfielder	2 July 2014	(England) Newcastle United	€7,500,000
Substituted off	(Netherlands) Jody Lukoki	Forward	7 August 2014	(Netherlands) PEC Zwolle	€1,500,000
Substituted off	(Netherlands) Timothy Fosu-Mensah	Defender	29 August 2014	(England) Manchester United	€380,000
Substituted off	(Netherlands) Daley Blind	Defender	30 August 2014	(England) Manchester United	€17,500,000
Substituted off	(Netherlands) Kenneth Vermeer	Goalkeeper	31 August 2014	(Netherlands) Feyenoord	€1,000,000
Substituted off	(Netherlands) Mink Peeters	Forward	12 September 2014	(Spain) Real Madrid	€110,000
	Free Transfer				
Substituted off	(Netherlands) Nick de Bondt	Forward	30 April 2014	(Netherlands) Go Ahead Eagles	-
Substituted off	(Netherlands) Joeri de Kamps	Midfielder	6 May 2014	(Netherlands) NAC Breda	-
Substituted off	(Netherlands) Jordi Bitter	Forward	20 May 2014	(Netherlands) Almere City	-
Substituted off	(Turkey) Serhat Çakmak	Forward	28 May 2014	(Turkey) Trabzonspor	-
Substituted off	(Netherlands) Sven Nieuwpoort	Defender	29 May 2014	(Netherlands) Go Ahead Eagles	-
Substituted off	(Netherlands) Branco van den Boomen	Defender	19 June 2014	(Netherlands) FC Eindhoven	-
Substituted off	(Curaçao) Derwin Martina	Defender	25 June 2014	(Netherlands) RKC Waalwijk	-
Substituted off	(Afghanistan) Emran Barakzai	Midfielder	30 June 2014	(Netherlands) VV Hoogland	-
Substituted off	(China) Wang Chengkuai	Midfielder	19 August 2014	(Portugal) Coimbrões	-
Substituted off	(Netherlands) Geoffrey Castillion	Forward	25 August 2014	(United States) New England Revolution	-
Substituted off	(Netherlands) Gino van Kessel	Forward	25 August 2014	(France) Arles-Avignon	-
Substituted off	(Netherlands) Mitchell Dijks	Defender	28 August 2014	(Netherlands) Willem II	-
Substituted off	(Netherlands) Danzell Gravenberch	Defender	4 September 2014	(Romania) Universitatea Cluj	-
Substituted off	(Denmark) Christian Poulsen	Midfielder	30 September 2014	(Denmark) Copenhagen	-

=== Winter transfer window ===
For a list of all Dutch football transfers in the winter window (1 January 2015 to 1 February 2015) please see List of Dutch football transfers winter 2014–15.

==== Arrivals ====
- The following players moved to AFC Ajax.

	Name	Position	Transfer type	Previous club	Fee
	Return from loan spell				
Substituted on	(Netherlands) Fabian Sporkslede	Midfielder	26 January 2014	(Netherlands) Willem II	-
Substituted on	(Serbia) Dejan Meleg	Forward	5 March 2015	(Netherlands) Cambuur	-
	Transfer				
Substituted on	(Cameroon) André Onana	Goalkeeper	14 January 2015	(Spain) Barcelona	€200,000
Substituted on	(Netherlands) Daley Sinkgraven	Midfielder	30 January 2015	(Netherlands) Heerenveen	€7,000,000

==== Departures ====
- The following players moved from AFC Ajax.

	Name	Position	Transfer type	New club	Fee
	Out on loan				
Substituted off	(Netherlands) Sheraldo Becker	Forward	4 January 2015	(Netherlands) PEC Zwolle	-
Substituted off	(Netherlands) Ruben Ligeon	Defender	27 January 2015	(Netherlands) NAC Breda	-
Substituted off	(Netherlands) Lerin Duarte	Midfielder	31 January 2015	(Netherlands) Heerenveen	-
	Free Transfer				
Substituted off	(Netherlands) Maurits Schmitz	Goalkeeper	1 January 2015	(Netherlands) Go Ahead Eagles	-
Substituted off	(Netherlands) Stefano Denswil	Defender	3 January 2015	(Belgium) Club Brugge	-
Substituted off	(Sweden) Tobias Sana	Midfielder	14 January 2015	(Sweden) Malmö FF	-
Substituted off	(Netherlands) Robert van Koesveld	Defender	2 February 2015	(Netherlands) Heerenveen	-
Substituted off	(Netherlands) Ilan Boccara	Midfielder	2 March 2015	(Israel) Hapoel Kfar Saba	-
