= Giorgi Chanturia (footballer) =

Georgian footballer

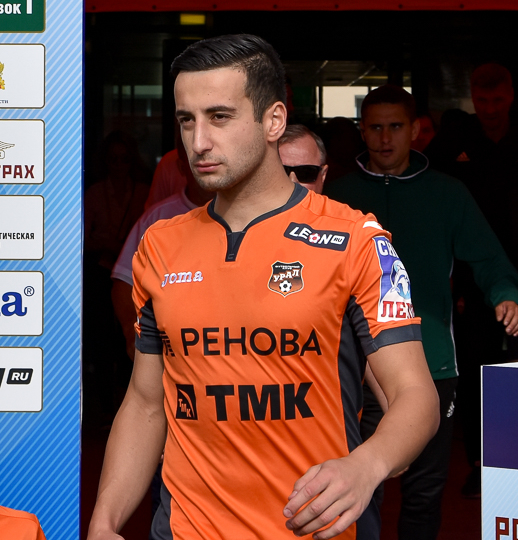
- Chanturia with Ural Yekaterinburg

Personal information
- Date of birth: 11 April 1993 (age 33)
- Place of birth: Tbilisi, Georgia
- Height: 1.81 m (5 ft 11 in)
- Position: Winger

Youth career
- 2004–2010: Saburtalo Tbilisi
- 2009–2010: → Barcelona (loan)
- 2010–2011: Vitesse

Senior career*
Years	Team	Apps	(Gls)
2011–2014	Vitesse	37	(5)
2012–2013	→ Alania Vladikavkaz (loan)	6	(0)
2014	CFR Cluj	7	(1)
2014–2015	Verona	0	(0)
2014–2015	→ CFR Cluj (loan)	25	(5)
2015–2016	MSV Duisburg	22	(4)
2016–2018	Ural Yekaterinburg	30	(5)
2020	Saburtalo Tbilisi	0	(0)

International career
2008–2009	Georgia U-17	9	(5)
2010–2012	Georgia U-19	6	(4)
2011–2014	Georgia U-21	14	(5)
2014–2017	Georgia	15	(2)
- * Club domestic league appearances and goals

Giorgi Chanturia (Georgian: გიორგი ჭანტურია, romanized: giorgi ch'ant'uria, pronounced [ɡioɾɡi tʃʼantʼuɾia]; born 11 April 1993) is a Georgian former professional footballer who played as a winger.

== Club career ==
=== Spain ===
Chanturia began his career on Saburtalo Tbilisi, and was loaned to Barcelona in June 2009. He was filled into Barça's Juvenil B squad, and scored 11 goals to help the Catalans to the league title.

=== Vitesse ===
In August 2010, after being linked with Chelsea, Chanturia signed with Vitesse Arnhem. In April 2011 he signed a three-year deal with the club.

Chanturia made his competitive debut for Vitesse on the opening day of the 2011–12 Eredivisie season, as a starter in their 0–0 away draw against ADO Den Haag on 7 August. He scored his first goal for the Arnhem side in his second official match, against VVV-Venlo in a 4–0 win.

In December 2012, Chanturia was loaned to Alania Vladikavkaz until the end of the season. He returned to Vitesse at the end of the season, and was reintegrated to first-team squad for the 2013–14 season.

=== CFR Cluj ===
On 19 February 2014, CFR Cluj confirmed the signing of Chanturia from Vitesse for an undisclosed fee.

=== Hellas Verona ===
On 12 June 2014, Chanturia joined Hellas Verona from Cluj.

==== Return to Cluj on loan ====
However, in September Chanturia returned to Cluj on loan with Hellas sporting director Scala Sogliano stating that the club had "decided to give [Chanturia] the opportunity to find his best form" and that Chanturia wanted "his debut with the Verona [to live] up to expectations".

=== MSV Duisburg ===
On 25 September 2015, 2. Bundesliga club MSV Duisburg announced their signing of free agent Chanturia on a contract running until the end of the season including the option for further two years.

=== Ural Yekaterinburg ===
On 5 July 2016, Chanturia moved to Russia, signing with Ural Yekaterinburg. In April 2018 he suffered an ACL injury, it took him six months to recover and he could not regain his squad position after that. On 18 January 2019, he was released from his Ural contract by mutual consent.

== International career ==
Chanturia made his first international appearance for Georgia in a friendly match against Liechtenstein on 5 March 2014. He scored only 25 minutes into his debut.

== Career statistics ==
=== Club ===
As of match played 9 December 2018

Appearances and goals by club, season and competition
Club	Season	League		Cup		Continental		Total	
Club	Season	Apps	Goals	Apps	Goals	Apps	Goals	Apps	Goals
Vitesse Arnhem	2011–12	28	4	3	0	0	0	31	4
Vitesse Arnhem	2012–13	1	0	0	0	3	0	4	0
Vitesse Arnhem	2013–14	8	1	2	1	2	0	12	2
Vitesse Arnhem	Total	37	5	5	1	5	0	47	6
Alania Vladikavkaz (loan)	2012–13	6	0	0	0	0	0	6	0
CFR Cluj	2013–14	7	1	0	0	—		7	1
CFR Cluj	2014–15	22	4	4	2	—		26	6
CFR Cluj	Total	29	5	4	2	0	0	33	7
Verona	2014–15	0	0	0	0	—		0	0
MSV Duisburg	2015–16	22	4	0	0	—		22	4
Ural Yekaterinburg	2016–17	12	2	2	2	—		14	4
Ural Yekaterinburg	2017–18	18	3	0	0	—		18	3
Ural Yekaterinburg	2018–19	0	0	1	0	—		1	0
Ural Yekaterinburg	Total	30	5	3	2	0	0	33	7
Career total		124	19	12	5	5	0	141	24

=== International ===
Scores and results list Georgia's goal tally first, score column indicates score after each Chanturia goal.

List of international goals scored by Giorgi Chanturia
No.	Date	Venue	Opponent	Score	Result	Competition
1	5 March 2014	Mikheil Meskhi Stadium, Tbilisi, Georgia	Liechtenstein	1–0	2–0	Friendly
2	16 November 2015	Qemal Stafa Stadium, Tirana, Albania	Albania	2–0	2–2	Friendly
