= Vito Wormgoor =

Dutch footballer

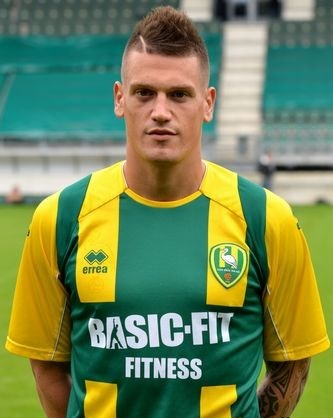
- Wormgoor with ADO Den Haag in 2012

Personal information
- Full name: Vito Nova Wormgoor
- Date of birth: 16 November 1988 (age 37)
- Place of birth: Leersum, Netherlands
- Height: 1.88 m (6 ft 2 in)
- Position: Centre-back

Team information
- Current team: DOVO
- Number: 18

Youth career
- 199?–1999: HDS
- 1999–2006: DOVO
- 2006–2008: Ajax

Senior career*
Years	Team	Apps	(Gls)
2008–2009	Utrecht	9	(0)
2009–2012	De Graafschap	84	(3)
2012–2016	ADO Den Haag	106	(3)
2016	Aalesund	11	(0)
2017–2019	Brann	83	(11)
2020–2021	Columbus Crew	19	(0)
2022–2024	Start	50	(1)
2024	Cambuur	2	(0)
2024–	DOVO	27	(3)

International career
- Netherlands U20
	Netherlands U21	7	(0)
- * Club domestic league appearances and goals as of 11 January 2026

Vito Nova Wormgoor (Dutch pronunciation: [ˈvɪtoː ˈnoːvaː ˈʋɔr(ə)mɣoːr]; born 16 November 1988) is a Dutch professional footballer who plays as a centre-back for Derde Divisie club DOVO.

== Career ==
Wormgoor has played for various youth clubs. In 2006, he moved to Ajax where he was a reserve defensive player for two seasons. On 2 September 2008, he moved to FC Utrecht and made his debut against FC Groningen on 14 September 2008. In the 2008–09 season he played seven games. In mid-2012 he signed with ADO Den Haag.

On 18 December 2019, Wormgoor was signed to Columbus Crew. Wormgoor suffered a long-term injury early in the season that kept him out for the duration of Columbus's season, however, he was part of the squad that won the 2020 MLS Cup. Following the 2021 season, Columbus opted to decline their contract option on Wormgoor.

On 30 January 2024, Wormgoor joined Cambuur until the end of the season.

== Personal life ==
His younger brother Nando Wormgoor is also a footballer.

== Career statistics ==
=== Club ===
As of 19 December 2019

Appearances and goals by club, season and competition
Club	Season	League			National cup		Continental		Other		Total	
Club	Season	Division	Apps	Goals	Apps	Goals	Apps	Goals	Apps	Goals	Apps	Goals
FC Utrecht	2008–09	Eredivisie	9	0	0	0	–		0	0	9	0
De Graafschap	2009–10	Eerste Divisie	30	2	0	0	–		0	0	30	2
De Graafschap	2010–11	Eredivisie	26	0	1	0	–		1 (Note: Appearance in the Eredivisie play-offs)	0	28	0
De Graafschap	2011–12	Eredivisie	28	1	3	0	–		0	0	31	1
De Graafschap	Total		84	3	4	0	0	0	1	0	89	3
ADO Den Haag	2012–13	Eredivisie	32	1	2	0	–		0	0	34	1
ADO Den Haag	2013–14	Eredivisie	25	0	1	1	–		0	0	26	1
ADO Den Haag	2014–15	Eredivisie	26	0	0	0	–		0	0	26	0
ADO Den Haag	2015–16	Eredivisie	23	2	1	0	–		0	0	24	2
ADO Den Haag	Total		106	3	4	1	0	0	0	0	110	4
Aalesund	2016	Tippeligaen	11	0	0	0	–		0	0	11	0
Brann	2017	Eliteserien	26	2	1	0	2 (Note: Appearances in the Europa League)	0	0	0	29	2
Brann	2018	Eliteserien	29	4	0	0	0	0	0	0	29	4
Brann	2019	Eliteserien	28	5	2	0	0	0	0	0	30	5
Brann	Total		83	11	3	0	2	0	0	0	88	11
Columbus Crew	2020	Major League Soccer	2	0	0	0	–		0	0	2	0
Columbus Crew	2021	Major League Soccer	17	0	0	0	0	0	0	0	17	0
Columbus Crew	Total		19	0	0	0	0	0	0	0	19	0
Career total			312	17	11	1	2	0	1	0	326	18

== Honours ==
De Graafschap

- Eerste Divisie: 2009–10

Columbus Crew

- MLS Cup: 2020
- Campeones Cup: 2021
