= Anwar El Ghazi =

Dutch footballer (born 1995)

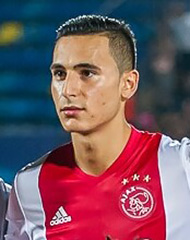
- El Ghazi with Ajax in 2016

Personal information
- Full name: Anwar El Ghazi
- Date of birth: 3 May 1995 (age 31)
- Place of birth: Barendrecht, Netherlands
- Height: 1.89 m (6 ft 2 in)
- Position: Winger

Team information
- Current team: Al-Sailiya
- Number: 27

Youth career
- 2000–2006: Barendrecht
- 2006–2008: Feyenoord
- 2008–2009: Spartaan '20
- 2009–2013: Sparta
- 2013–2014: Ajax

Senior career*
Years	Team	Apps	(Gls)
2014–2017	Ajax	70	(20)
2017–2019	Lille	39	(5)
2018–2019	→ Aston Villa (loan)	31	(5)
2019–2022	Aston Villa	71	(15)
2022	→ Everton (loan)	2	(0)
2022–2023	PSV	24	(8)
2023	Mainz 05	3	(0)
2024–2025	Cardiff City	25	(3)
2025–	Al-Sailiya	18	(2)

International career
2011	Netherlands U17	2	(1)
2012–2013	Netherlands U18	3	(2)
2014–2016	Netherlands U21	11	(3)
2015	Netherlands	2	(0)
- * Club domestic league appearances and goals as of 5 August 2026

Anwar El Ghazi (Arabic: أنور الغازي; born 3 May 1995) is a Dutch professional footballer who plays as a winger for Qatar Stars League club Al-Sailiya.

== Club career ==
=== Early career ===
El Ghazi began his football career in the youth ranks of his local club BVV Barendrecht, joining the youth academy of Feyenoord for two seasons. He then joined the ranks of Spartaan '20 before being recruited to Sparta Rotterdam, where he progressed through the academy. In 2013, he joined the Ajax Youth Academy, playing for the A1 selection (under-19), competing in the UEFA Youth League.

=== Ajax ===
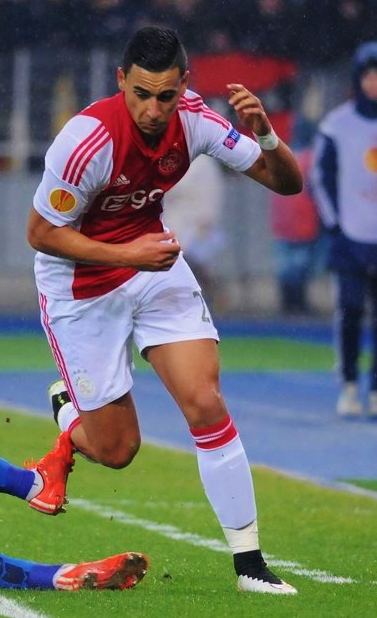
El Ghazi playing for Ajax in 2015

El Ghazi was signed by Ajax in July 2013. During the 2014–15 pre-season, he scored 8 goals in 150 minutes of playing time, finishing as Ajax's top pre-season scorer. While Ajax initially intended to send El Ghazi to their reserve team, Jong Ajax, El Ghazi's pre-season prompted Ajax to include him in the first-team squad, following the loan of fellow winger Lesley de Sa to Go Ahead Eagles. El Ghazi made his official debut for Ajax in the 2014 Johan Cruyff Shield against PEC Zwolle, coming on for Ricardo Kishna in the 1–0 loss at home.

El Ghazi made his regular season debut for Ajax in the 2014–15 Eredivisie season opener against Vitesse. The match ended in a 4–1 home victory, with El Ghazi providing the assist for the fourth goal by Lasse Schöne in the 87th minute. On 17 August 2014, El Ghazi scored his first Eredivisie goal in the 3–1 away win against AZ, scoring in the 90th minute. He scored his first UEFA Champions League goal on 22 October 2014 at Camp Nou against Barcelona in the 88th minute of a 3–1 loss. In so doing, he became the first player to score at Camp Nou since the beginning of the 2014–15 season, when Barcelona went five matches at home without conceding a goal.

=== Lille ===
On 31 January 2017, it was announced El Ghazi had been sold to French Ligue 1 side Lille for a €8 million transfer fee. On 18 February, he scored his first goal for Lille against Caen, which also became the winner (0–1).

On 6 August 2017, on the first matchday of the 2017–18 season, El Ghazi scored Lille's third goal against Nantes. To celebrate, he took off his shirt to reveal a shirt paying tribute to Abdelhak Nouri, his former Ajax teammate who the month before had collapsed and suffered a cardiac arrhythmia attack, which had left him with severe and permanent brain damage and unable to continue as a footballer. During the 2017–18 season, El Ghazi scored four goals and delivered two assists in 27 appearances. The Dutch striker distinguished himself in particular during the match against RC Strasbourg, on 28 January 2018 at home at the Stade Pierre-Mauroy, where he scored the first goal; a header, after an assist by Nicolas Pépé. He then delivered an assist for the Edgar Ié, sealing the win for Lille.

On 18 February 2018, El Ghazi suffered a hamstring injury against Lyon, sidelining him for several weeks. Due to complications, he did not return until the end of the season, where he struggled to establish himself in head coach Christophe Galtier's starting lineup.

=== Aston Villa ===
On 22 August 2018, El Ghazi signed for Championship club Aston Villa on a season-long loan, with a clause to buy included. He made his debut on 25 August 2018 in a 1–1 draw with Reading, providing an assist by crossing the ball to Ahmed Elmohamady, who scored a header. He scored his first goal for the Villans a week later on 1 September 2018 in a 4–1 defeat to Sheffield United. On 28 April 2019, in a heated contest between Aston Villa and Championship playoff rivals Leeds United at Elland Road, El Ghazi was mistakenly shown a red card by referee Stuart Attwell. This occurred after El Ghazi allegedly struck Leeds forward Patrick Bamford during an on pitch brawl following Mateusz Klich's controversial 72nd opening goal for Leeds United following Tyler Roberts' refusal to put the ball out of touch for an injury. The decision was met with controversy from fans and pundits alike, with Aston Villa head coach Dean Smith claiming that after reviewing the footage of the incident reported that he'd be 'amazed' if the red card and subsequent three-game ban weren't overturned after appeal. The red card and ban were later rescinded and on 2 May, Bamford was banned for two games for "successful deception of a match official". On 27 May 2019, El Ghazi scored Aston Villa's first goal in their 2–1 EFL Championship Play-off final victory over Derby County. In the 44th minute he met an Ahmed Elmohamady cross from the right with an attempted diving header which diverted in off his back. In the second half an El Ghazi shot from just outside the penalty area was blocked by Richard Keogh, looping up for John McGinn to steal in and score with a header, putting Aston Villa 2–0 up in the tie on 59 minutes. El Ghazi signed for Villa permanently on 10 June 2019 on a four-year contract for an undisclosed fee. He scored 4 goals and contributed 4 assists in his first Premier League season, as Villa narrowly avoided relegation.

On 26 December 2020, El Ghazi scored a goal in the 3–0 home victory over Crystal Palace that would go onto to be voted Aston Villa's goal of the season for the 2020–21 season. It was one of 11 goals scored that season, equalling his best ever goalscoring season with Ajax.

==== Everton (loan) ====
On 13 January 2022, El Ghazi joined fellow Premier League side Everton on loan. He took the number 34 shirt in honour of former Ajax teammate Abdelhak Nouri, who retired from football following a collapse in a friendly on 2017 at the age of 20.

=== PSV ===
On 30 August 2022, El Ghazi returned to the Netherlands, signing for PSV Eindhoven. He made his debut in a 2–1 defeat to Twente on 3 September. His contract with PSV was terminated by mutual consent on 4 September 2023.

=== Mainz 05 ===
On 22 September 2023, El Ghazi signed a two-year contract with Bundesliga club Mainz 05. El Ghazi played his only game with Mainz 05 on 6 October against Borussia Mönchengladbach, being subbed on for Brajan Gruda, where he assisted Aymen Barkok's goal in the 75th minute to make the game 2–1. El Ghazi was suspended by Mainz 05 on 17 October for sharing a pro-Palestinian post on Instagram relating to the Gaza war, which contained the statement "From the river to the sea, Palestine will be free." He later stated "Every individual, be it in Palestine or elsewhere, has the right to security, a loving home, and opportunities to grow." Due to his comments, Mainz 05's official Instagram account was taken offline in the wake of El Ghazi's release.

On 27 October, Mainz informed El Ghazi that they intended to terminate his contract due to his social media post. However, he returned on 31 October after it was reported that he distanced himself from his statement by stating that he stood "for peace above everything" and calling for "more empathy" as "deepening our knowledge about the history of this conflict is vital". A week later, Mainz terminated his contract. This came after El Ghazi denied the club's statement that he had backed away from his initial statement, saying on social media that he had not authorised the club's statement on the matter: "I do not distance myself from what I said and stand for humanity and on the side of the oppressed until the last day I breathe."

In November 2023, El Ghazi announced that he would be taking Mainz to the Labour Court of Mainz for wrongful dismissal. On 12 July 2024, the Labour Court ruled that El Ghazi was unfairly dismissed by Mainz. Mainz were ordered to pay El Ghazi €1.5 million compensation. On 23 August, El Ghazi confirmed that he had received the €1.5 million compensation ordered by the court, of which he would donate €0.5 million to children in Gaza; he is still owed €200,000 in bonuses by Mainz. He said he would like to thank Mainz for funding "projects for children in Gaza" and "in attempting to silence me, making my voice even louder for the oppressed and voiceless in Gaza". In September 2025, El Ghazi won a further back-pay case against Mainz, with the court proposing a settlement of about €800,000. A month later, Mainz lost their court appeal, with the ruling upheld that El Ghazi had been wrongfully dismissed, requiring Mainz to honour the full salary owed under his contract. He reacted by criticising the club, calling them “serial losers not content with losing on the football pitch.”

=== Cardiff City ===
On 1 August 2024, El Ghazi signed a one-year contract with Cardiff City. In June 2025, Cardiff announced that El Ghazi would depart the club upon the end of the season.

=== Al-Sailiya ===
On 10 September 2025, Qatari side Al-Sailiya announced the signing of Anwar El Ghazi from Cardiff City on a two-year contract.

== International career ==
Having dual citizenship, El Ghazi was eligible to represent either the Netherlands or Morocco at senior level. He made his international debut playing for the Netherlands under-18 side in a friendly match against Austria on 15 October 2012, a 2–0 loss.

=== Netherlands ===
El Ghazi met Cristiano Ronaldo during the summer break, a player who he looks up to, and asked him whether he should represent the Netherlands or Morocco. Ronaldo advised him to choose the Netherlands because he would have a higher chance to participate in an international tournament, based on their history. Consequently, El Ghazi said he would choose to represent the Netherlands and was subsequently called up for the Netherlands' two final UEFA Euro 2016 qualifying matches, against Kazakhstan on 10 October 2015 and the Czech Republic on 13 October. He was named in the Oranje's starting line-up for both matches as the Dutch defeated Kazakhstan 2–1 but lost to the Czechs 3–2. The Netherlands failed to qualify for the tournament proper after finishing fourth in their qualifying group.

On 14 May 2021, El Ghazi was called up by Frank de Boer and the Netherlands to be part of the provisional squad for the upcoming UEFA Euro 2020 tournament, making it his first call-up to the national team since 2015.

=== Morocco ===
In October 2022 El Ghazi confirmed that he was considering switching to Morocco and that the Royal Moroccan Football Federation was working on the paperwork. He is yet to make an appearance for them. Under FIFA eligibility rules, players can switch associations if they held dual nationality at their debut, were under 21, played three or fewer competitive matches, and have not played internationally for at least three years. Because El Ghazi's only two competitive appearances for the Netherlands occurred in 2015 when he was 20, he remains eligible to apply for the switch.

== Career statistics ==
=== Club ===
As of match played 17 January 2026

Appearances and goals by club, season and competition
Club	Season	League			National cup		League cup		Continental (Note: Includes UEFA Champions League and UEFA Europa League)		Other (Note: Includes Johan Cruyff Shield and Championship play-offs)		Total	
Club	Season	Division	Apps	Goals	Apps	Goals	Apps	Goals	Apps	Goals	Apps	Goals	Apps	Goals
Ajax	2014–15	Eredivisie	31	9	2	0	—		9	1	1	0	43	10
Ajax	2015–16	Eredivisie	27	11	1	0	—		9	0	—		37	11
Ajax	2016–17	Eredivisie	12	0	2	1	—		6	1	—		20	2
Ajax	Total		70	20	5	1	0	0	24	2	1	0	100	23
Lille	2016–17	Ligue 1	12	1	1	1	—		—		—		13	2
Lille	2017–18	Ligue 1	27	4	2	0	2	0	—		—		31	4
Lille	Total		39	5	3	1	2	0	0	0	0	0	44	6
Aston Villa (loan)	2018–19	Championship	31	5	1	0	1	0	—		3	1	36	6
Aston Villa	2019–20	Premier League	34	4	1	1	5	1	—		—		40	6
Aston Villa	2020–21	Premier League	28	10	0	0	3	1	—		—		31	11
Aston Villa	2021–22	Premier League	9	1	1	0	2	2	—		—		12	3
Aston Villa	Total		102	20	3	1	11	4	0	0	3	1	119	26
Everton (loan)	2021–22	Premier League	2	0	0	0	0	0	—		—		2	0
PSV	2022–23	Eredivisie	23	8	3	0	—		5	1	—		31	9
PSV	2023–24	Eredivisie	1	0	0	0	—		0	0	1 (Note: Appearance in Johan Cruyff Shield)	0	2	0
PSV	Total		24	8	3	0	0	0	5	1	1	0	33	9
Mainz 05	2023–24	Bundesliga	3	0	0	0	—		—		—		3	0
Cardiff City	2024–25	Championship	25	3	2	0	0	0	—		—		27	3
Al-Sailiya	2025–26	Qatar Stars League	10	0	0	0	4	5	—		—		14	5
Career total			275	56	16	3	17	9	29	3	5	1	341	72

=== International ===
As of match played 13 October 2015

Appearances and goals by national team and year
National team	Year	Apps	Goals
Netherlands	2015	2	0
Total		2	0

== Honours ==
Aston Villa

- EFL Championship play-offs: 2019
- EFL Cup runner-up: 2019–20

PSV

- KNVB Cup: 2022–23
- Johan Cruyff Shield: 2023

Individual

- Ajax Talent of the Year (Marco van Basten Award): 2015
