= Dan Mori =

Israeli footballer

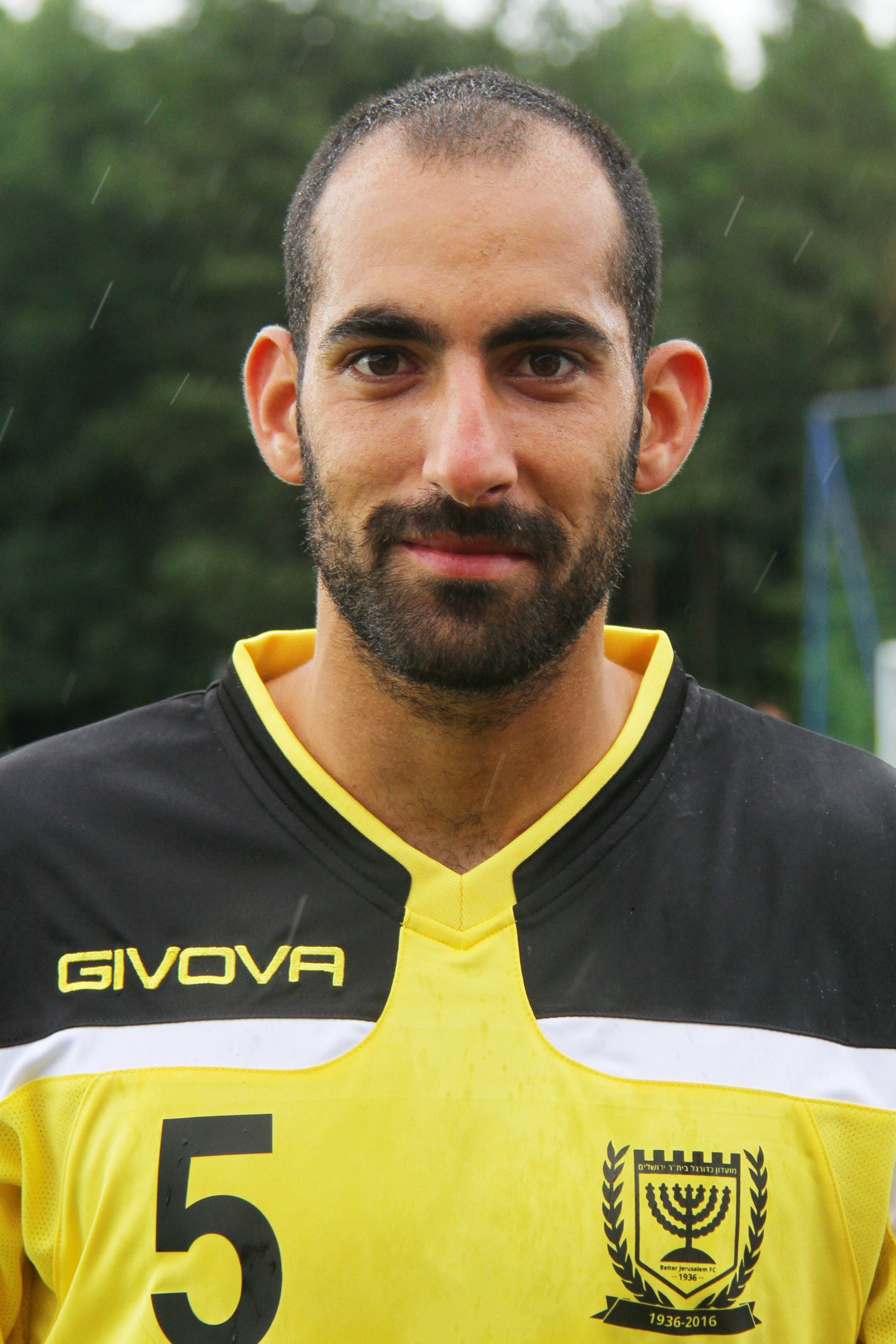
- Mori with Beitar Jerusalem in 2016

Personal information
- Full name: Dan Mori
- Date of birth: 8 November 1988 (age 38)
- Place of birth: Tel Aviv, Israel
- Height: 1.84 m (6 ft 1/2 in)
- Position: Centre-back

Youth career
- Bnei Yehuda

Senior career*
Years	Team	Apps	(Gls)
2007–2012	Bnei Yehuda	123	(5)
2012–2015	Vitesse Arnhem	19	(1)
2015–2016	Bnei Yehuda	20	(1)
2016–2017	Beitar Jerusalem	29	(0)
2017–2022	Bnei Yehuda	142	(3)
2022–2024	Beitar Ramat Gan	12	(0)

International career
2008–2010	Israel U21	7	(0)
2009–2012	Israel	7	(0)
- * Club domestic league appearances and goals

Dan Mori (Hebrew: דן מורי, was born as Dean (Din) Mori, דין מורי; on 8 November 1988) is an Israeli former footballer who played as a centre-back.

== Club career ==
=== Bnei Yehuda Tel Aviv ===
Mori began his football career, playing for Bnei Yehuda Tel Aviv and joined the club since he was thirteen. Mori was then promoted to the first team squad in 2008. In the 2008–09 season, Mori scored his first European goal, in the first leg of second round of the Europa League, as Bnei Yehuda Tel Aviv wins 4–0 against Dinaburg.

In the Israel State Cup, Mori played in the final, as his side lose 3–1 against Hapoel Tel Aviv. In his Bnei Yehuda Tel Aviv career, Mori made 123 appearances and scoring four times.

=== Vitesse ===
In the summer of 2012, Mori joined Dutch Eredivisie club Vitesse Arnhem on a three-year contract, with the fee believed to be €300,000. After spending two months on the bench, Mori finally made his debut for the club, and his first start, in a 2–2 draw with Groningen on 27 October 2012. However, in his first season, Mori spent most of his time on the bench, without being called to the pitch. This continuously happens onwards in the 2013–14 season. Mori quoted on his time at Vitesse in an interview: "I do not get the minutes I want to get, I did not go to serve as decor. While difficult, do not even go to sea."

Mori was refused entry to the United Arab Emirates, where Vitesse had arranged a training camp in January 2014, because of his nationality.

=== Bnei Yehuda Tel Aviv ===
On 25 October 2015, Mori returned to Bnei Yehuda Tel Aviv.

=== Beitar Jerusalem ===
On 9 June 2016, Mori signed with Beitar Jerusalem for two years.

== International career ==
In 2008, Mori was called up by Israel U21 squad and two years later, Mori was called up by the Israel. On 3 March 2010, Mori made his debut, coming on as a substitute in the 70th minute for Tal Ben Haim, in a 2–0 win over Romania.

== Personal life ==
In 2011, Mori changed his name from Dean to Dan because he believed the name "Dean means 'trial', and Jewish people shouldn't be called by that name". It was Chaim Kanievsky who was responsible for changing his name.
