= Nando Wormgoor =

Dutch footballer

Personal information
- Date of birth: 17 February 1992 (age 34)
- Place of birth: Leersum, Netherlands
- Height: 1.84 m (6 ft 0 in)
- Position: Centre-back

Youth career
- HDS
- Elinkwijk
- Vitesse

Senior career*
Years	Team	Apps	(Gls)
2013–2015	Dordrecht	10	(0)
2015	→ RKC Waalwijk (loan)	14	(0)
2015–2017	RKC Waalwijk	33	(0)
2017–2019	DOVO	50	(5)
2019–2020	Kozakken Boys	7	(0)
2020	SteDoCo		
Total		114	(5)
- * Club domestic league appearances and goals

Nando Wormgoor (born 17 February 1992) is a Dutch former professional footballer who plays as a centre-back.

== Personal life ==
His older brother Vito Wormgoor is also a footballer.
