= Frank van der Struijk =

Dutch footballer

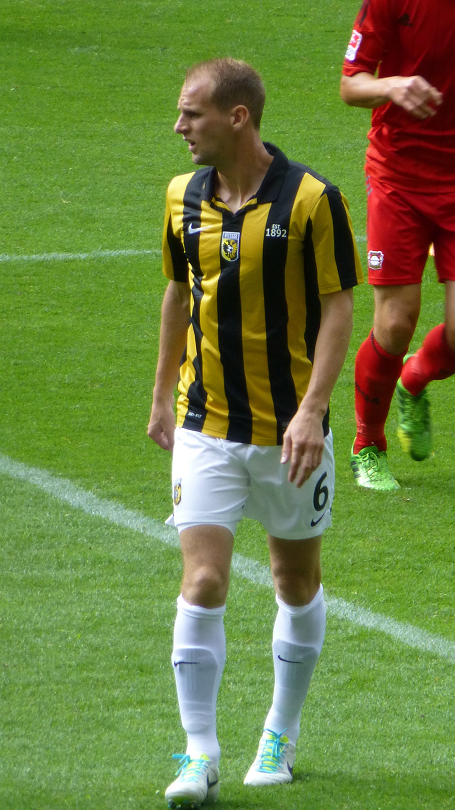

Personal information
- Full name: Frank van der Struijk
- Date of birth: 28 March 1985 (age 41)
- Place of birth: Boxtel, Netherlands
- Height: 1.81 m (5 ft 11 in)
- Positions: Right back; centre back

Youth career
- 1991–2003: LSV Lennisheuvel
- 2003–2005: Willem II

Senior career*
| Years | Team | Apps | (Gls) |
| 2003–2008 | Willem II | 109 | (5) |
| 2008–2014 | Vitesse | 115 | (1) |
| 2010 | → Willem II (loan) | 11 | (0) |
| 2014–2016 | Willem II | 59 | (1) |
| 2016–2017 | Dundee United | 16 | (0) |
| 2017–2018 | ODC Boxtel | | |
| 2018–2021 | Real Lunet | | |
| 2021–2023 | CHC Den Bosch | | |
| Total | | 310 | (7) |

International career
| 2007 | Netherlands U21 | 1 | (0) |
Medal record
Men's football
Representing Netherlands
UEFA European Under-21 Championship
| Winner | 2007 Netherlands |
- * Club domestic league appearances and goals

Frank van der Struijk (born 28 March 1985) is a Dutch former professional footballer who plays as a right back or centre back.

== Club career ==
Van der Struijk made his debut in the professional football squad of Willem II in the 2003–04 season. He joined Vitesse Arnhem in 2008 and returned to Willem II on loan in 2010. He later rejoined the club permanently in 2014.

He signed a one-year contract with Scottish club Dundee United in August 2016. He was released by Dundee United when his contract expired at the end of the 2016–17 season.

== International career ==
In 2007 Van der Struijk was called up by Jong Oranje coach Foppe de Haan to be part of his squad for the 2007 UEFA European Under-21 Football Championship where they qualified for the 2008 Summer Olympics. The final was reached with a 1–1, 13–12 win after a penalty shootout with 32 penalty kicks taken against England. The Dutch went on to retain their 2006 title by beating Serbia 4–1 in the final.

== Honours ==
Dundee United

- Scottish Challenge Cup: 2016–17
