= Roy Talsma =

Dutch footballer

Personal information
- Full name: Roy Talsma
- Date of birth: 31 August 1994 (age 32)
- Place of birth: Velp, Netherlands
- Height: 1.69 m (5 ft 6 1/2 in)
- Position: Forward

Team information
- Current team: GVVV

Youth career
- 2000–2004: Eendracht Arnhem
- 2004–2006: De Graafschap
- 2006–2007: ESA Rijkerswoerd
- 2007–2014: Vitesse Arnhem

Senior career*
Years	Team	Apps	(Gls)
2014–2015	Telstar	13	(1)
2015–	GVVV	18	(1)

International career
2013	Netherlands U19	2	(0)
- * Club domestic league appearances and goals as of 15:09, 11 July 2017 (UTC)

Roy Talsma (born 31 August 1994) is a Dutch footballer who plays as a forward for GVVV.

== Club career ==
Talsma was born in Velp. After playing for Eendracht Arnhem, De Graafschap and ESA Rijkerswoerd, he joined Vitesse Arnhem's youth setup in 2007, aged 13, being released in 2014.

On 26 June 2014 Talsma joined SC Telstar, in Eerste Divisie. He made his professional debut on 15 August, coming on as a late substitute in a 1–2 home loss against Roda JC.

On 17 April 2015 Talsma agreed a deal with GVVV, becoming effective in June of the same year.
