= 2011–12 FC Emmen season =

Dutch football club season

FC Emmen
2011–12 season
- Stadium: Unive Stadion
- Eerste Divisie: 18th
- KNVB Cup: 2nd round
- Top goalscorer: League: Randy Wolters, Ruud ter Heide (4 goals); All: Randy Wolters, Ruud ter Heide (4 goals)
- Biggest win: 1-0 (AGOVV (a) 9th week, AGOVV (h) 19th week); 3-2 (Go Ahead Eagles (h) 12th week); 2-1 (MVV Maastricht (h) 13th week, SC Cambuur (h) 22nd week)
- Biggest defeat: 6-0 (MVV Maastricht (a) 23rd week)
- All statistics correct as of 27 April 2012.

The 2011–12 season was FC Emmen's 27th successive season in the Eerste Divisie, the second tier of Dutch football. Emmen finished bottom of the league table in 18th place. In the KNVB Cup, the team reached the second round before being eliminated by FC Eindhoven in a 3–1 defeat.

The club's top scorers in the league were Randy Wolters and Ruud ter Heide, who each scored four goals. Goalkeeper Harm Zeinstra made the most appearances for FC Emmen for the second consecutive season, playing 35 matches in total: 34 in the Eerste Divisie and one in the KNVB Cup.

== Players ==
=== First-team squad ===
As of 1 January 2012

Note: Flags indicate national team as defined under FIFA eligibility rules; some limited exceptions apply. Players may hold more than one non-FIFA nationality.

No.	Pos.	Nation	Player
—	DF	NED	Arsenio Halfhuid
—	DF	NED	Bart de Groot
—	DF	POR	Elson Almeida
—	FW	NED	Eldridge Rojer
—	MF	NED	Enzo Huntink
—	MF	NED	Ernesto Seymonson
—	GK	NED	Harm Zeinstra
—	MF	NED	Jeffrey de Visscher
—	DF	NED	Johnny de Vries
—	MF	NED	Jorrit Kunst
—	MF	NED	Kay Velda
—	DF	NED	Kevin Görtz

No.	Pos.	Nation	Player
—	DF	NED	Marijn Sterk
—	MF	GLP	Matthieu Bemba
—	DF	TUR	Mehmet Boztepe
—	MF	SVK	Michal Mravec
—	FW	NED	Michel Poldervaart
—	MF	GER	Mike Koenders
—	FW	NED	Randy Wolters
—	FW	NED	Renaldo Jongebloet
—	FW	NED	Ruud ter Heide
—	DF	NED	Sander Fischer
—	MF	KOS	Shkodran Metaj
—	MF	GRE	Vasileios Emmanouil

== Transfers ==
=== In ===
Pos.	Player	Transferred from	Fee	Date
DF	(Netherlands) Jorrit Kunst	(Netherlands) FC Groningen	Free	1 July 2011
MF	(Netherlands) Matthieu Bemba	(Cyprus) Ermis Aradippou FC	Free	1 July 2011
MF	(Slovakia) Michal Mravec	(United States) Sporting Kansas City	Free	1 July 2011
DF	(Germany) Mike Koenders	(Netherlands) SC Heerenveen U19	Free	1 July 2011
MF	(Greece) Vasilios Emmanouil	(Netherlands) SC Heerenveen U19	On loan	1 July 2011
DF	(Netherlands) Marijn Sterk	(Netherlands) FC Volendam	Free	1 August 2011
MF	(Kosovo) Shkodran Metaj	(Netherlands) FC Groningen	On loan	1 August 2011
DF	(Netherlands) Arsenio Halfhuid	(Netherlands) HBS Craeyenhout	Free	1 January 2012
FW	(Turkey) Mehmet Boztepe	(Turkey) Eskişehirspor U21	Free	15 January 2012
FW	(Netherlands) Renaldo Jongebloet	(Netherlands) FC Dordrecht	On loan	1 January 2012

=== Out ===
Pos.	Player	Transferred to	Fee	Date
MF	(Netherlands) Richard Stolte	(Netherlands) SC Heerenveen	End of loan	30 June 2011
DF	(Curaçao) Angelo Zimmerman	(Netherlands) WKE '16	Free	1 July 2011
MF	(Netherlands) Erik van der Ven	(Netherlands) De Treffers	Free	1 July 2011
DF	(Netherlands) Guus de Vries	(Netherlands) WKE '16	Free	1 July 2011
DF	(Brazil) Leonardo	End of career	—N/a	1 July 2011
FW	(Suriname) Tjaronn Chery	(Netherlands) ADO Den Haag	€175,000	1 July 2011

== Competitions ==
=== Overall record ===
Competition	First match	Last match	Starting round	Final position	Record							
Competition	First match	Last match	Starting round	Final position	Pld	W	D	L	GF	GA	GD	Win %
Eerste Divisie	5 August 2011	27 April 2012	Week 1	18th	34	6	5	23	24	73	−49	17.65
KNVB Cup	20 September 2011	20 September 2011	2nd round	2nd round	1	0	0	1	1	3	−2	0.00
Total					35	6	5	24	25	76	−51	17.14

Source: ESPN

=== Eerste Divisie ===
==== League table ====
Pos	Team	Pld	W	D	L	GF	GA	GD	Pts
14	Oss	34	10	5	19	56	76	−20	35
15	Telstar	34	9	5	20	45	70	−25	32
16	Veendam	34	4	10	20	42	67	−25	22
17	AGOVV	34	5	4	25	36	94	−58	19
18	Emmen (Note: Emmen deducted six points due to financial irregularities.)	34	6	5	23	24	73	−49	17

Source: Eerste divisie (official site) (in Dutch)
Rules for classification: 1) points; 2) goal difference; 3) number of goals scored.

==== Results summary ====
Overall								Home						Away					
Pld	W	D	L	GF	GA	GD	Pts	W	D	L	GF	GA	GD	W	D	L	GF	GA	GD
34	6	5	23	24	73	−49	23	4	3	10	15	31	−16	2	2	13	9	42	−33

Last updated: 27 April 2012.
Source: https://www.espn.nl/voetbal/team/scorebord/_/id/3707/competitie/NED.2/season/2011/

==== Results by round ====
Round	1	2	3	4	5	6	7	8	9	10	11	12	13	14	15	16	17	18	19	20	21	22	23	24	25	26	27	28	29	30	31	32	33	34
Ground	A	H	A	H	H	A	H	A	A	H	A	H	H	A	A	H	A	A	H	A	H	H	A	A	H	H	A	H	H	A	H	A	A	H
Result	L	D	L	L	L	L	L	L	W	D	L	W	W	D	W	L	L	D	W	L	L	W	L	L	L	L	L	L	L	L	L	L	L	D
Position																																		18 (Note: FC Emmen deducted six points due to financial irregularities.)

Source: https://www.espn.nl/voetbal/team/scorebord/_/id/3707/competitie/NED.2/season/2011/ ESPN
A = Away; H = Home; W = Win; D = Draw; L = Loss

=== Matches ===
==== 1st half ====
5 August 2011 1st week	FC Eindhoven	3–0	FC Emmen	Eindhoven
20:00	Serhat Koç 47'; Josemar Makiavala 47'; Rob van Boekel 88'	Report		Stadium: Jan Louwers Stadion; Referee: Jeroen Abbink

12 August 2011 2nd week	FC Emmen	1–1	FC Dordrecht	Emmen
20:00	Ruud ter Heide 14' (pen.)	Report	Cecilio Lopes 41'	Stadium: Unive Stadion; Referee: Allard Lindhout

19 August 2011 3rd week	Fortuna Sittard	4–1	FC Emmen	Sittard
20:00	Wouter Scheelen 59'; Richard Stolte 67'; Danny Hoesen 75'; Kevin Diaz 90+1'	Report	Elson Almeida 63'	Stadium: Trendwork Arena; Attendance: Maarten Ketting

29 August 2011 4th week	FC Emmen	1–3	TOP Oss	Emmen
20:00	Zdenko Kapralik 41' (o.g.)	Report	Marcel van der Sloot 45+3' 57'; Christopher Bieber 76'	Stadium: Unive Stadion

9 September 2011 5th week	FC Emmen	0–2	Willem II Tilburg	Emmen
20:00		Report	Donny de Groot 41'; Rowin van Zaanen 47'	Stadium: Unive Stadion; Attendance: Eric Braamhaar

18 September 2011 6th week	SC Veendam	3–0	FC Emmen	Veendam
14:30	Anco Jansen 54'; Danny Menting 64'; Mitch Apau 90+2'	Report		Stadium: De Langeleegte

24 September 2011 7th week	FC Emmen	0–4	FC Volendam	Emmen
19:300		Report	Achmed Ahahaoui 21' 73' 81'; Jack Tuyp 28'	Stadium: Unive Stadion; Referee: Dennis Higler

30 September 2011 8th week	SC Cambuur	2–1	FC Emmen	Leeuwarden
20:00	Erik Bakker 73' (pen.) 89' (pen.)	Report	Randy Wolters 41'	Stadium: Cambuur Stadion; Referee: Allard Lindhout

14 October 2011 9th week	AGOVV	0–1	FC Emmen	Apeldoorn
20:00		Report	Jeffrey de Visscher 81'	Stadium: Sportpark Berg & Bos; Attendance: 2,618; Referee: Edwin van de Graaf

10th week	FC Emmen	2–2	Almere City FC	Emmen
19:30	Jorrit Kunst 17'; Ruud ter Heide 76' (pen.)	Report	Thijs Sluijter 29'; Cees Toet 43'	Stadium: Unive Stadion

31 October 2011 11th week	FC Den Bosch	5–1	FC Emmen	's-Hertogenbosch
20:00	Paco van Moorsel 25'; Danny Verbeek 45+1' 87'; Tom van Weert 49' 51'	Report	Randy Wolters 88'	Stadium: De Vliert

4 November 2011 12th week	FC Emmen	3–2	Go Ahead Eagles	Emmen
20:00	Ruud ter Heide 8'; Jeffrey de Visscher 9'; Bart de Groot 65'	Report	Joey Suk 67'; Patrick Gerritsen 76'	Stadium: Unive Stadion; Attendance: 2,913

25 November 2011 13th week	FC Emmen	2–1	MVV Maastricht	Emmen
20:00	Ruud ter Heide 64'; Sander Fischer 89'	Report	Michael La Rosa 28'	Stadium: Unive Stadion; Attendance: 2,849; Referee: Jeroen Abbink

29 November 2011 14th week	Sparta Rotterdam	1–1	FC Emmen	Rotterdam
20:00	Jeremy Bokila 36'	Report	Randy Wolters 10'	Stadium: Het Kasteel; Attendance: 6,236; Referee: Patrick Gerritsen

2 December 2011 15th week	Helmond Sport	0–1	FC Emmen	Helmond
20:00		Report	Sander Fischer 62'	Stadium: Lavans Stadion; Attendance: 2,391; Referee: Christaan Bax

9 December 2011 16th week	FC Emmen	1–2	PEC Zwolle	Emmen
20:00	Ruud ter Heide 39' (pen.)	Report	Nassir Maachi 22'; Furdjel Narsingh 54'	Stadium: Unive Stadion; Referee: Eric Braamhaar

16 December 2011 17th week	SC Telstar	2–1	FC Emmen	Velsen-Zuid
20:00	Jergé Hoefdraad 17'; Kevin Brands 90'	Report	Shkodran Metaj 8'	Stadium: TATA Steel Stadion; Attendance: 2,133

==== 2nd half ====
13 January 2012 18th week	TOP Oss	1–1	FC Emmen	Oss
20:00	Marcel van der Sloot 80'	Report	Shkodran Metaj 80'	Stadium: Frans Heesen Stadion; Attendance: 2,078

20 January 2012 19th week	FC Emmen	1–0	AGOVV	Emmen
20:00	Kay Velda 19'	Report		Stadium: Unive Stadion; Attendance: 1,865

27 January 2012 20th week	Almere City FC	2–0	FC Emmen	Almere
20:00	Mikhail Rosheuvel 29'; Serdar Öztürk 88'	Report		Stadium: Mitsubishi Forkliftstadion

20 February 20012 21st week	FC Emmen	1–2	FC Den Bosch	Emmen
20:00	Marijn Sterk 86'	Report	Ralf Seuntjens 17'; Bart van Brakel 54'	Stadium: Unive Stadion; Attendance: 2,005

24 February 2012 22nd week	FC Emmen	2–1	SC Cambuur	Emmen
20:00	Bart de Groot 85'; Sander Fischer 90'	Report	Bob Schepers 71'	Stadium: Unive Stadion; Attendance: 2,606

27 February 2012 23rd week	MVV Maastricht	6–0	FC Emmen	Maastricht
20:00	Malcolm Esajas 17'; Tom Daemen 31' (pen.); Prince Rajcomar 44'; Fabio Caracciolo 64'; Leroy Labylle 74'; Lloyd Borgers 88'	Report		Stadium: De Geusselt; Attendance: 4,078

2 March 2012 24th week	Willem II Tilburg	5–0	FC Emmen	Tilburg
20:00	Marc Höcher 5'; Robbie Haemhouts 29'; Arjan Swinkels 30' 47'; Istvan Bakx 53'	Report		Stadium: Koning Willem II Stadion; Attendance: 8,650

5 March 2012 25th week	FC Emmen	0–2	SC Veendam	Emmen
20:00		Report	Johnatan Opoku 31'; Danilo Romano 52'	Stadium: Unive Stadion; Attendance: 3,186

9 March 2012 26th week	FC Emmen	0–1	FC Eindhoven	Emmen
20:00		Report	Sjors Paridaans 23'	Stadium: Unive Stadion; Attendance: 1,867

16 March 2012 27th week	FC Dordrecht	3–0	FC Emmen	Dordrecht
20:00	Tom Beugelsdijk 33'; Santy Hulst 79'; Danny Post 83'	Report		Stadium: GN Bouw Stadion; Attendance: 1,921

23 March 20012 28th week	FC Emmen	0–4	Fortuna Sittard	Emmen
20:00		Report	Jorrit Kunst 41' (o.g.); Danny Hoesen 54' 74'; Harrie Gommans 83'	Stadium: Unive Stadion; Attendance: 1,764

30 March 2012 29th week	FC Emmen	0–1	Helmond Sport	Emmen
20:00		Report	Erik Quekel 30'	Stadium: Unive Stadion; Attendance: 1,582

6 April 2012 30th week	PEC Zwolle	1–0	FC Emmen	Zwolle
20:00	Nassir Maachi 57'	Report		Stadium: Oosterenkstadion; Attendance: 9,167

9 April 2012 31st week	FC Emmen	0–2	SC Telstar	Emmen
20:00		Report	Johan Plat 31' 67'	Stadium: Unive Stadion; Attendance: 1,033

13 April 2012 32nd week	FC Volendam	3–1	FC Emmen	Volendam
20:00	Maikel van der Werff 9' 86'; Michiel Kramer 36'	Report	Eldridge Rojer 72'	Stadium: Kras Stadion; Attendance: 2,928

20 April 2012 33rd week	Go Ahead Eagles	1–0	FC Emmen	Deventer
20:00	Marnix Kolder 13'	Report		Stadium: De Adelaarshorst; Attendance: 5,654

27 April 2012 34th week	FC Emmen	1–1	Sparta Rotterdam	Emmen
20:00	Randy Wolters 7'	Report	Mario Bilate 10'	Stadium: Unive Stadion

=== KNVB Cup ===
21 September 2011 2nd round	FC Eindhoven	3–1	FC Emmen	Eindhoven
20:00	Rob van Boekel 10'; Leon Kantelberg 56'; Wesley Vanbelle 60'		Elson Almeida 51'	Stadium: Jan Louwers Stadion; Attendance: 1,100; Referee: Edwin van de Graaf

== Statistics ==
=== Scorers ===
#	Player	Eerste Divisie	KNVB Cup	Total
1	(Netherlands) Randy Wolters	4	0	4
1	(Netherlands) Ruud ter Heide	4	0	4
3	(Netherlands) Sander Fischer	3	0	3
4	(Netherlands) Bart de Groot	2	0	2
4	(Netherlands) Jeffrey de Visscher	2	0	2
4	(Cape Verde) Elson Almeida	1	1	2
7	(Netherlands) Eldridge Rojer	1	0	1
7	(Netherlands) Jorrit Kunst	1	0	1
7	(Netherlands) Kay Velda	1	0	1
7	(Netherlands) Marijn Sterk	1	0	1
7	(Kosovo) Shkodran Metaj	1	0	1

=== Appearances ===
#	Player	Eerste Divisie	KNVB	Total
1	(Netherlands) Harm Zeinstra	34	1	35
2	(Netherlands) Jorrit Kunst	32	1	33
2	(Netherlands) Randy Wolters	32	1	33
2	(Netherlands) Sander Fischer	32	1	33
5	(Netherlands) Bart de Groot	31	1	32
6	(Netherlands) Kevin Görtz	29	1	30
6	(Kosovo) Shkodran Metaj	29	1	30
8	(Netherlands) Jeffrey de Visscher	28	1	29
9	(Germany) Mike Koenders	25	0	25
9	(Guadeloupe) Matthieu Bemba	24	1	25
11	(Netherlands) Kay Velda	20	0	20
12	(Netherlands) Marijn Sterk	18	1	19
13	(Slovakia) Michal Mravec	17	1	18
14	(Netherlands) Ruud ter Heide	17	0	17
15	(Netherlands) Michel Poldervaart	15	1	16
16	(Portugal) Elson Almeida	14	1	15
17	(Netherlands) Renaldo Jongebloet	14	0	14
18	(Netherlands) Eldridge Rojer	13	0	13
18	(Turkey) Mehmet Boztepe	13	0	13
20	(Netherlands) Johnny de Vries	10	1	11
21	(Netherlands) Enzo Huntink	8	0	8
22	(Netherlands) Arsenio Halfhuid	7	0	7
23	(Netherlands) Ernesto Seymonson	1	0	1
23	(Greece) Vasileios Emmanouil	1	0	1

=== Clean sheets ===
#	Player	Eerste Divisie
1	(Netherlands) Harm Zeinstra	3

=== Disciplinary record ===
#	Player	Eerste Divisie		KNVB		Total	
#	Player	Yellow card	Red card	Yellow card	Red card	Yellow card	Red card
1	(Netherlands) Jeffrey de Visscher	3	2	0	0	3	2
2	(Germany) Mike Koenders	6	1	0	0	6	1
3	(Netherlands) Johnny de Vries	1	1	1	0	2	1
4	(Netherlands) Arsenio Halfhuid	1	1	0	0	1	1
5	(Netherlands) Sander Fischer	10	0	0	0	10	0
6	(Kosovo) Shkodran Metaj	9	0	0	0	9	0
7	(Netherlands) Randy Wolters	7	0	0	0	7	0
8	(Netherlands) Bart de Groot	4	0	0	0	4	0
8	(Netherlands) Kevin Görtz	4	0	0	0	4	0
8	(Slovakia) Michal Mravec	4	0	0	0	4	0
11	(Netherlands) Kay Velda	3	0	0	0	3	0
12	(Netherlands) Enzo Huntink	2	0	0	0	2	0
13	(Portugal) Elson Almeida	1	0	0	0	1	0
13	(Netherlands) Jorrit Kunst	1	0	0	0	1	0
13	(Netherlands) Marijn Sterk	1	0	0	0	1	0
13	(Netherlands) Michel Poldervaart	1	0	0	0	1	0
13	(Netherlands) Ruud ter Heide	1	0	0	0	1	0
