= 2013–14 Eredivisie =

58th season of the Eredivisie

Eredivisie
- Season: 2013–14
- Dates: 2 August 2013 – 18 May 2014
- Champions: Ajax (33rd title)
- Relegated: Roda JC; NEC; RKC Waalwijk
- Champions League: Ajax; Feyenoord
- Europa League: PEC Zwolle; Twente; PSV; Groningen
- Matches: 306
- Goals: 978 (3.2 per match)
- Top goalscorer: Alfreð Finnbogason (29 goals)
- Biggest home win: Twente 6–0 Utrecht; Ajax 6–0 Go Ahead Eagles
- Biggest away win: N.E.C. 1–5 PEC Zwolle; ADO Den Haag 0–4 Roda JC; Roda JC 1–5 NAC Breda; ADO Den Haag 0–4 Ajax; PSV 2–6 Vitesse; Utrecht 1–5 PSV; AZ 1–5 Heerenveen
- Highest scoring: PSV 2–6 Vitesse
- Longest winning run: 8 games Ajax
- Longest unbeaten run: 22 games Ajax
- Longest winless run: 11 games NAC Breda
- Longest losing run: 6 games Roda JC
- Total attendance: 5,954,320
- Average attendance: 19,458

The 2013–14 Eredivisie was the 58th season of Eredivisie since its establishment in 1955. It began on 2 August 2013 with the first match of the season and ended on 18 May 2014 with the returns of the finals of the European competition and relegation playoffs.

== Teams ==
A total of 18 teams took part in the league: The best fifteen teams from the 2012–13 season, two promotion/relegation playoff winners and the 2012–13 Eerste Divisie champions.

Location of teams in Eredivisie 2013–14

Club	Location	Venue	Capacity	Average attendance
ADO Den Haag	The Hague	Kyocera Stadion	15,000	10,854
Ajax	Amsterdam	Amsterdam Arena	53,052	50,907
AZ	Alkmaar	AFAS Stadion	17,023	15,574
Cambuur	Leeuwarden	Cambuur Stadion	10,250	9,728
Feyenoord	Rotterdam	Stadion Feijenoord	51,177	45,757
Go Ahead Eagles	Deventer	Adelaarshorst	8,000	7,630
Groningen	Groningen	Euroborg	22,550	19,780
Heerenveen	Heerenveen	Abe Lenstra Stadion	26,100	22,781
Heracles	Almelo	Polman Stadion	8,500	8,339
NAC	Breda	Rat Verlegh Stadion	19,005	17,915
N.E.C.	Nijmegen	Stadion de Goffert	12,500	11,065
Zwolle	Zwolle	IJsseldelta Stadion	12,500	12,042
PSV	Eindhoven	Philips Stadion	35,000	33,024
RKC Waalwijk	Waalwijk	Mandemakers Stadion	7,508	6,252
Roda JC	Kerkrade	Parkstad Limburg Stadion	18,936	13,952
Twente	Enschede	De Grolsch Veste	30,014	29,546
Utrecht	Utrecht	Stadion Galgenwaard	23,750	16,938
Vitesse	Arnhem	GelreDome	25,000	18,989

=== Personnel and kits ===
Note: Flags indicate national team as has been defined under FIFA eligibility rules. Players and managers may hold more than one non-FIFA nationality.

Team	Manager	Kit manufacturer	Shirt sponsor
ADO Den Haag	(Netherlands) Henk Fraser	Erreà	Basic-Fit Fitness
Ajax	(Netherlands) Frank de Boer	adidas	Aegon
AZ	(Netherlands) Dick Advocaat	Macron	AFAS software
Cambuur	(Netherlands) Dwight Lodeweges	Quick	Bouwgroep Dijkstra Draisma
Feyenoord	(Netherlands) Ronald Koeman	Puma	Opel
Go Ahead Eagles	(Netherlands) Foeke Booy	Hummel	vinden.nl
Groningen	(Netherlands) Erwin van de Looi	Klupp	Essent
Heerenveen	(Netherlands) Marco van Basten	Jako	Univé
Heracles	(Netherlands) Jan de Jonge	Erima	TenCate
NAC	(Serbia) Nebojša Gudelj	Patrick	Into Telecom
N.E.C.	(Netherlands) Anton Janssen	Jako	Scholten Awater
PEC Zwolle	(Netherlands) Ron Jans	Patrick	Kraanwater graag
PSV	(Netherlands) Phillip Cocu	Nike	Philips
RKC Waalwijk	(Netherlands) Erwin Koeman	Hummel	Mandemakers Keukens
Roda JC	(Denmark) Jon Dahl Tomasson	Lotto	Toverland
Twente	(Netherlands) Alfred Schreuder (Netherlands) Michel Jansen (strawperson)	Nike	XXImo
Utrecht	(Netherlands) Jan Wouters	hummel	HealthCity
Vitesse	(Netherlands) Peter Bosz	Nike	Youfone

=== Managerial changes ===
Team	Outgoing manager	Manner of departure	Date of vacancy	Position in table	Replaced by	Date of appointment
Zwolle	(Netherlands) Art Langeler	End of contract	1 July 2013	Pre-season	(Netherlands) Ron Jans	1 July 2013
Groningen	(Netherlands) Robert Maaskant	End of contract	1 July 2013	Pre-season	(Netherlands) Erwin van de Looi	1 July 2013
Cambuur	(Netherlands) Henk de Jong	End of interim spell	1 July 2013	Pre-season	(Netherlands) Dwight Lodeweges	1 July 2013
PSV	(Netherlands) Dick Advocaat	End of contract	1 July 2013	Pre-season	(Netherlands) Phillip Cocu	1 July 2013
Vitesse	(Netherlands) Fred Rutten	End of contract	1 July 2013	Pre-season	(Netherlands) Peter Bosz	1 July 2013
Go Ahead Eagles	(Netherlands) Erik ten Hag	Signed by Bayern Munich II	1 July 2013	Pre-season	(Netherlands) Foeke Booy	1 July 2013
Heracles Almelo	(Netherlands) Peter Bosz	Signed by Vitesse	1 July 2013	Pre-season	(Netherlands) Jan de Jonge	1 July 2013
N.E.C.	(Netherlands) Alex Pastoor	Sacked	19 August 2013	18th	(Netherlands) Anton Janssen	27 August 2013
AZ	(Netherlands) Gertjan Verbeek	Sacked	29 September 2013	8th	(Netherlands) Dick Advocaat	16 October 2013
Roda JC	(Netherlands) Ruud Brood	Sacked	15 December 2013	14th	(Denmark) Jon Dahl Tomasson	26 December 2013
ADO Den Haag	(Netherlands) Maurice Steijn	Sacked	5 February 2014	18th	(Netherlands) Henk Fraser	5 February 2014
Cambuur	(Netherlands) Dwight Lodeweges	Resigned	1 April 2014	11th	(Netherlands) Henk de Jong (interim)	1 April 2014

== League table ==
Pos	Team	Pld	W	D	L	GF	GA	GD	Pts	Qualification or relegation
1	Ajax (C)	34	20	11	3	69	28	+41	71	Qualification for the Champions League group stage
2	Feyenoord	34	20	7	7	76	40	+36	67	Qualification for the Champions League third qualifying round
3	Twente	34	17	12	5	72	37	+35	63	Qualification for the Europa League play-off round
4	PSV	34	18	5	11	60	45	+15	59	Qualification for the Europa League third qualifying round
5	Heerenveen	34	16	9	9	72	51	+21	57	Qualification for the European competition play-offs
6	Vitesse Arnhem	34	15	10	9	65	49	+16	55	Qualification for the European competition play-offs
7	Groningen (O)	34	14	9	11	57	53	+4	51	Qualification for the European competition play-offs
8	AZ	34	13	8	13	54	50	+4	47	Qualification for the European competition play-offs
9	ADO Den Haag	34	12	7	15	45	64	−19	43	
10	Utrecht	34	11	8	15	46	65	−19	41	
11	PEC Zwolle	34	9	13	12	47	49	−2	40	Qualification for the Europa League play-off round (Note: PEC Zwolle qualified for the 2014–15 UEFA Europa League play-off round by winning the 2013–14 KNVB Cup.)
12	Cambuur	34	10	9	15	40	50	−10	39	
13	Go Ahead Eagles	34	10	8	16	45	69	−24	38	
14	Heracles	34	10	7	17	45	59	−14	37	
15	NAC Breda	34	8	11	15	43	54	−11	35	
16	RKC Waalwijk (R)	34	7	11	16	44	64	−20	32	Qualification for the Relegation play-offs
17	NEC (R)	34	5	15	14	54	82	−28	30	Qualification for the Relegation play-offs
18	Roda JC (R)	34	7	8	19	44	69	−25	29	Relegation to Eerste Divisie

Source: Eredivisie
Rules for classification: 1) points; 2) goal difference; 3) number of goals scored
(C) Champions; (O) Play-off winners; (R) Relegated

== Results ==
Home \ Away	ADO	AJX	AZ	CAM	GRO	TWE	UTR	GAE	ZWO	FEY	HER	NAC	NEC	PSV	RKC	RJC	HEE	VIT
ADO Den Haag		0–4	2–1	3–0	2–1	3–2	4–1	3–2	1–1	3–2	0–3	1–1	1–1	2–3	1–2	0–4	1–1	2–1
Ajax	3–2		4–0	1–1	2–1	3–0	3–0	6–0	2–1	2–1	3–0	4–0	2–2	1–0	0–0	3–0	3–0	0–1
AZ	2–0	3–2		3–1	2–0	1–2	1–1	3–0	2–1	1–1	4–0	3–0	1–1	2–1	4–0	2–2	1–5	1–1
Cambuur	1–2	1–2	0–0		4–1	0–1	3–1	2–0	3–1	0–2	2–0	0–0	2–1	1–2	3–2	1–0	3–1	4–3
Groningen	1–2	1–1	2–1	1–1		1–1	2–0	1–0	0–0	0–2	3–1	2–1	5–2	1–0	4–1	3–3	1–3	3–1
Twente	1–1	1–1	2–1	3–1	5–0		6–0	3–1	2–2	2–2	3–1	5–2	2–2	2–2	0–0	3–0	1–1	2–0
Utrecht	3–0	1–1	2–0	1–0	1–0	1–1		1–1	1–2	2–5	2–1	4–2	2–0	1–5	2–1	3–3	2–0	2–1
Go Ahead Eagles	2–1	0–1	2–1	0–0	3–3	1–0	2–1		4–1	2–2	1–1	2–1	4–3	2–3	2–2	0–1	0–2	0–3
Zwolle	6–1	1–1	0–2	2–0	0–1	1–1	1–1	2–0		2–1	1–1	0–0	3–3	1–2	1–1	3–1	1–2	1–2
Feyenoord	4–2	1–2	2–2	5–1	1–0	1–4	1–0	5–0	3–0		1–2	3–1	5–1	3–1	2–0	4–0	2–0	1–1
Heracles	1–0	1–1	2–0	1–1	0–3	0–3	1–2	1–2	1–3	1–2		1–2	1–1	1–1	2–1	2–1	1–2	2–2
NAC Breda	1–2	0–0	3–0	1–0	2–2	0–2	2–2	5–0	1–2	1–1	2–1		1–1	2–1	1–1	2–0	0–2	1–2
NEC	3–1	0–3	3–2	1–1	1–4	2–5	2–2	1–1	1–5	3–3	1–2	1–1		0–2	2–2	4–3	2–1	2–3
PSV	2–0	4–0	1–0	0–0	2–3	3–2	1–0	3–0	1–1	0–2	2–1	2–0	5–0		2–1	3–1	1–1	2–6
RKC Waalwijk	1–1	0–2	1–2	2–2	1–1	1–1	5–2	1–4	1–1	1–0	1–4	3–0	1–3	2–0		1–2	0–3	4–2
Roda JC	0–1	1–2	2–2	2–0	1–2	1–2	1–0	1–4	0–0	1–2	1–3	1–5	3–1	2–1	0–1		3–3	1–1
Heerenveen	3–0	3–3	4–2	2–1	4–2	0–2	4–1	3–1	3–0	1–2	2–4	0–0	2–2	3–0	5–2	2–2		2–3
Vitesse Arnhem	0–0	1–1	0–2	3–0	2–2	1–0	3–1	2–2	3–0	1–2	3–1	3–2	1–1	1–2	3–1	3–0	2–2	

Source: Soccerway
Legend: Blue = home team win; Yellow = draw; Red = away team win.

== Season statistics ==
=== Top scorers ===
Rank	Player	Club	Goals
1	(Iceland) Alfreð Finnbogason	Heerenveen	29
2	(Italy) Graziano Pellè	Feyenoord	23
3	(United States) Aron Jóhannsson	AZ	17
4	(Serbia) Dušan Tadić	Twente	16
5	(Netherlands) Luc Castaignos	Twente	14
5	(England) Michael Higdon	N.E.C.	14
7	(Netherlands) Jürgen Locadia	PSV	13
8	(Netherlands) Lex Immers	Feyenoord	12
8	(Netherlands) Memphis Depay	PSV	12
8	(Netherlands) Jens Toornstra	Utrecht	12

=== Assists ===
Rank	Player	Club	Assists
1	(Serbia) Dušan Tadić	Twente	14
2	(Iceland) Alfreð Finnbogason	Heerenveen	10
3	(Netherlands) Jean-Paul Boëtius	Feyenoord	9
3	(Netherlands) Hakim Ziyech	Heerenveen	9
5	(Denmark) Lasse Schöne	Ajax	8
5	(Netherlands) Nick van der Velden	Groningen	8
5	(Morocco) Youness Mokhtar	Zwolle	8
5	(Netherlands) Quincy Promes	Twente	8
5	(Brazil) Lucas Piazon	Vitesse Arnhem	8

== European competition ==
The teams finishing fifth through eight play-off for a berth in the Second qualifying round of the 2014–15 UEFA Europa League. Groningen won this berth after winning the four-team play-off.

Semi-finals
AZ	3	0	3
Heerenveen	0	1	1
Groningen	1	4	5
Vitesse	0	1	1

Final
AZ	0	0	0
Groningen^{*}	0	3	3

Key: * = Play-off winners, a = Wins because of away goals rule, e = Wins after extra time in second leg, p = Wins after penalty shoot-out.

=== Semi-final ===
==== First leg ====
7 May 2014	Groningen	1–0	Vitesse	Groningen
18:45	Burnet 88'	Report		Stadium: Euroborg; Attendance: 19,000; Referee: Van Boekel

7 May 2014	AZ	3–0	Heerenveen	Alkmaar
20:45	Ortiz 26'; Gudelj 38' (pen.); Berghuis 39'	Report		Stadium: AFAS Stadion; Attendance: 12,298; Referee: Makkelie

==== Second leg ====
10 May 2014	Vitesse	1–4 (1–5 agg.)	Groningen	Arnhem
18:45	Pröpper 63'	Report	Chery 25'; Zivkovic 64'; Kostić 83', 89'	Stadium: GelreDome; Attendance: 15,000; Referee: Vink

10 May 2014	Heerenveen	1–0 (1–3 agg.)	AZ	Heerenveen
20:45	Slagveer 47'	Report		Stadium: Abe Lenstra Stadion; Attendance: 18,100; Referee: Liesveld

=== Final ===
==== First leg ====
15 May 2014	AZ	0–0	Groningen	Alkmaar
20:45		Report		Stadium: AFAS Stadion; Attendance: 14,222; Referee: Kevin Blom

==== Second leg ====
18 May 2014	Groningen	3–0 (3–0 agg.)	AZ	Groningen
16:30	Chery 24', 61'; Hateboer 33'	Report		Stadium: Euroborg; Attendance: 22,206; Referee: Bjorn Kuipers

== Eredivisie play-offs ==
Ten teams played for two spots in the 2014–15 Eredivisie. Four teams from the 2013–14 Eerste Divisie entered in the first round, another four and the teams ranked 16th and 17th in the 2013–14 Eredivisie entered in the second round. Both winners of the third round, FC Dordrecht and Excelsior, played in the 2014–15 Eredivisie.

First round
Sparta Rotterdam	1	2	3
FC Eindhoven	1	0	1
Fortuna Sittard	1	1	2
De Graafschap	4	3	7

Second round
Sparta Rotterdam	1	3	4
NEC Nijmegen	0	1	1
VVV-Venlo	1	1	2
FC Dordrecht	3	2	5
De Graafschap	0	1	1
RKC Waalwijk	1	1	2
FC Den Bosch	1	1	2
Excelsior	3	2	5

Third round
Sparta Rotterdam	2	1	3
FC Dordrecht^{*}	2	3	5
RKC Waalwijk	0	2	2
Excelsior^{*}	2	2	4

Key: * = Play-off winners, a = Wins because of away goals rule, e = Wins after extra time in second leg, p = Wins after penalty shoot-out.

=== First round ===
==== Match A ====
28 April 2014 First leg	Sparta Rotterdam	1 – 1	FC Eindhoven	Rotterdam
	Stokkers 72'	Report	Van den Hurk 89'	Stadium: Sparta Stadion Het Kasteel; Attendance: 5,992; Referee: Jeroen Sanders

2 May 2014 Second leg	FC Eindhoven	0 – 2 (1 – 3 agg.)	Sparta Rotterdam	Eindhoven
		Report	Breuer 40' (pen.); Stokkers 89'	Stadium: Jan Louwers Stadion; Referee: Dennis Higler

==== Match B ====
28 April 2014 First leg	Fortuna Sittard	1 – 4	De Graafschap	Sittard
	Gulpen 80'	Report	Kabasele 45', 51'; Koolhof 76'; Vermeij 90'	Stadium: Offermans Joosten Stadion; Attendance: 4,893; Referee: Jeroen Manschot

2 May 2014 Second leg	De Graafschap	3 – 1 (7 – 2 agg.)	Fortuna Sittard	Doetinchem
	Koolhof 65'; Will 79'; Vermeij 87'	Report	Linssen 84'	Stadium: De Vijverberg; Attendance: 5350; Referee: Eric Braamhaar

=== Second round ===
==== Match C ====
8 May 2014 First leg	Sparta Rotterdam	1–0	N.E.C.	Rotterdam
	Boukhari 85'			Stadium: Sparta Stadion Het Kasteel; Referee: Tom van Sichem

11 May 2014 Second leg	N.E.C.	1–3 (1–4 agg.)	Sparta Rotterdam	Nijmegen
	Koolwijk 67'		Van Hout 4'; Mahi 27'; Nieuwendaal 42'	Stadium: Stadion de Goffert; Referee: Eric Braamhaar

==== Match D ====
8 May 2014 First leg	VVV-Venlo	1–3	FC Dordrecht	Venlo
	Wolters 56'	Report	Gladon 20'; Vet 85'; Mayele 90'	Stadium: De Koel; Attendance: 6,500; Referee: Bas Nijhuis

11 May 2014 Second leg	FC Dordrecht	2–1 (5–2 agg.)	VVV-Venlo	Dordrecht
	Gladon 6'; Fortes 83'	Report	Reimerink 49'	Stadium: GN Bouw Stadion; Attendance: 3,198; Referee: Kevin Blom

==== Match E ====
8 May 2014 First leg	De Graafschap	0 – 1	RKC Waalwijk	Doetinchem
		Report	Duits 31'	Attendance: 7,803; Referee: Dennis Higler

11 May 2014 Second leg	RKC Waalwijk	1–1 (2–1 agg.)	De Graafschap	Waalwijk
	Beauguel 58'		Koolhof 56'	Stadium: Mandemakers Stadion; Referee: Reinold Wiedemeijer

==== Match F ====
8 May 2014 First leg	FC Den Bosch	1–3	Excelsior	's-Hertogenbosch
	Quekel 14'	Report	Kruys 69'; Fischer 77'; Vermeulen 90'	Stadium: De Vliert; Attendance: 5,484; Referee: Jochem Kamphuis

11 May 2014 Second leg	Excelsior	2–1 (5–2 agg.)	FC Den Bosch	Rotterdam
	Veldwijk 71', 89'	Report	Seuntjens 17'	Stadium: Stadion Woudestein; Attendance: 2,774; Referee: Ed Janssen

=== Third round ===
==== Match G ====
15 May 2014 First leg	Sparta Rotterdam	2 – 2	FC Dordrecht	Rotterdam
	M. Mahi 55'; J.Bruinier 80'	Report	D. Deekman 29'; G. Korte 63'	Stadium: Het Kasteel; Attendance: 10,000; Referee: Pol van Boekel

18 May 2014 Second leg	FC Dordrecht	3 - 1 (5 - 3 agg.)	Sparta Rotterdam	Dordrecht
	F. Ojo 5'; P. Gladon 44'; G. Korte 90+4'	Report	M. Mahi 55'	Stadium: GN Bouw Stadion; Attendance: 4,143; Referee: Pieter Vink

==== Match H ====
15 May 2014 First leg	Excelsior	2 – 0	RKC Waalwijk	Rotterdam
	K. Karami 3'; L. Veldwijk 40'	Report		Stadium: Stadion Woudesteijn; Attendance: 3,600; Referee: B. Nijhuis

18 May 2014 Second leg	RKC Waalwijk	2 - 2 (2 - 4 agg.)	Excelsior	Waalwijk
	J. Beauguel 38'; P. Jungschläger 44'	Report	L. Veldwijk 4'; S. Fischer 25'	Stadium: Mandemakers Stadion; Referee: D. Makkelie

== Attendances ==
No.	Club	Average	Change	Highest
1	AFC Ajax	50,907	0,8%	52,671
2	Feyenoord	45,757	1,0%	51,577
3	PSV	33,024	-0,5%	34,500
4	FC Twente	29,546	0,3%	30,000
5	sc Heerenveen	22,781	-7,7%	26,100
6	FC Groningen	19,780	-6,2%	21,674
7	SBV Vitesse	18,989	3,1%	25,500
8	NAC Breda	17,915	3,4%	19,000
9	FC Utrecht	16,938	-3,3%	22,134
10	AZ	15,574	-4,4%	16,749
11	Roda JC	13,952	3,2%	18,058
12	PEC Zwolle	12,042	11,9%	12,500
13	NEC	11,065	-7,2%	12,400
14	ADO Den Haag	10,854	3,3%	14,756
15	SC Cambuur	9,728	67,6%	10,000
16	Heracles Almelo	8,339	-1,1%	8,500
17	Go Ahead Eagles	7,630	68,5%	8,011
18	RKC Waalwijk	6,252	1,2%	7,508
