= 2013–14 Eerste Divisie =

58th season of the second-tier football league in Netherlands

Eerste Divisie
- Season: 2013–14

The 2013–14 Eerste Divisie, known as Jupiler League for sponsorship reasons, was the fifty-eight season of Eerste Divisie since its establishment in 1955. It began on 2 August 2013 with the first matches of the season and ended on 26 May 2014 with the return of the finals of the promotion/relegation play-offs, also involving the 16th- and 17th-placed teams from the 2013–14 Eredivisie.

== Teams ==
A total of 20 teams took part in the league. SC Cambuur were promoted from the Eerste Divisie as 2012–13 champions and replaced by bottom-placed Eredivisie Willem II, whereas Go Ahead Eagles won a top flight place in the nacompetitie, replacing VVV-Venlo, who were eliminated from the post-season playoff and therefore relegated to Eerste Divisie for this season. Following the bankruptcy of SC Veendam and AGOVV in 2012-13 and RBC and HFC Haarlem in previous seasons, four teams were added to bring the division back up to 20 teams. Achilles '29 were promoted from the Topklasse with the reserve teams of Ajax, FC Twente and PSV being added as well. Topklasse champion Katwijk declined promotion. The reserve teams were not eligible for promotion or play-off participation.

Location of teams in the Eerste Divisie 2013-2014

Club	Location	Venue	Capacity
Achilles '29	Groesbeek	Sportpark De Heikant	4,500
Jong Ajax	Amsterdam	Sportpark De Toekomst	4,000
Almere City FC	Almere	Mitsubishi Forklift Stadion	3,000
FC Den Bosch	's-Hertogenbosch	De Vliert	9,000
FC Dordrecht	Dordrecht	GN Bouw Stadion	4,100
FC Eindhoven	Eindhoven	Jan Louwers Stadion	4,600
FC Emmen	Emmen	Univé Stadion	8,600
S.B.V. Excelsior	Rotterdam	Stadion Woudestein	3,531
Fortuna Sittard	Sittard	Trendwork Arena	12,500
De Graafschap	Doetinchem	De Vijverberg	12,600
Helmond Sport	Helmond	Stadion De Braak	4,100
MVV	Maastricht	De Geusselt	10,000
FC Oss	Oss	Heesen Yachts Stadion	4,700
Jong PSV	Eindhoven	Philips Stadion	35,000
Sparta Rotterdam	Rotterdam	Het Kasteel	11,026
Telstar	Velsen	TATA Steel Stadion	3,625
Jong FC Twente	Enschede	De Grolsch Veste	30,014
FC Volendam	Volendam	Kras Stadion	6,260
VVV-Venlo	Venlo	De Koel	8,000
Willem II	Tilburg	Koning Willem II Stadion	14,500

== League table ==
Pos	Team	Pld	W	D	L	GF	GA	GD	Pts	Promotion or relegation
1	Willem II (C, P)	38	24	7	7	78	38	+40	79	Promotion to the Eredivisie
2	Dordrecht (O, P)	38	21	10	7	83	50	+33	73	Qualification for promotion play-offs Second round
3	Excelsior (O, P)	38	18	12	8	70	39	+31	66	Qualification for promotion play-offs Second round
4	Den Bosch	38	18	8	12	61	60	+1	62	Qualification for promotion play-offs Second round
5	VVV-Venlo	38	18	7	13	58	52	+6	61	Qualification for promotion play-offs Second round
6	Eindhoven	38	18	6	14	69	60	+9	60	Qualification for promotion play-offs First Round
7	De Graafschap	38	16	10	12	67	48	+19	58	Qualification for promotion play-offs First Round
8	Fortuna Sittard	38	15	11	12	59	45	+14	56	Qualification for promotion play-offs First Round
9	Volendam	38	16	8	14	67	71	−4	56	
10	Jong PSV	38	15	9	14	62	57	+5	54	
11	MVV	38	15	8	15	46	46	0	53	
12	Emmen	38	14	9	15	64	68	−4	51	
13	Helmond Sport	38	13	12	13	62	67	−5	51	
14	Jong Ajax	38	15	5	18	57	72	−15	50	
15	Telstar	38	13	6	19	50	79	−29	45	
16	Sparta Rotterdam	38	12	8	18	58	51	+7	44	Qualification for promotion play-offs First Round (Note: Sparta Rotterdam qualifies to the promotion play-offs after winning the second period title.)
17	Jong FC Twente	38	12	7	19	47	61	−14	43	
18	Almere City	38	11	8	19	49	65	−16	41	
19	Oss	38	9	4	25	49	78	−29	31	
20	Achilles '29	38	6	7	25	40	89	−49	25	

Source: Voetbal International
Rules for classification: 1) points; 2) goal difference; 3) number of goals scored.
(C) Champions; (O) Play-off winners; (P) Promoted

== Eredivisie play-offs ==
Ten teams play for two spots in the 2014–15 Eredivisie. Four teams from the 2013–14 Eerste Divisie enter in the first round, another four and the teams ranked 16th and 17th in the 2013–14 Eredivisie enter in the second round. Both winners of the third round, FC Dordrecht and Excelsior, play in the 2014–15 Eredivisie.

First round
Sparta Rotterdam	1	2	3
FC Eindhoven	1	0	1
Fortuna Sittard	1	1	2
De Graafschap	4	3	7

Second round
Sparta Rotterdam	1	3	4
NEC Nijmegen	0	1	1
VVV-Venlo	1	1	2
FC Dordrecht	3	2	5
De Graafschap	0	1	1
RKC Waalwijk	1	1	2
FC Den Bosch	1	1	2
Excelsior	3	2	5

Third round
Sparta Rotterdam	2	1	3
FC Dordrecht^{*}	2	3	5
Excelsior^{*}	2	2	4
RKC Waalwijk	0	2	2

Key: * = Play-off winners, a = Wins because of away goals rule, e = Wins after extra time in second leg, p = Wins after penalty shoot-out.

=== First round ===
==== Match A ====
28 April 2014 First leg	Sparta Rotterdam	1 – 1	FC Eindhoven	Rotterdam
	Stokkers 72'	Report	van den Hurk 89'	Stadium: Sparta Stadion Het Kasteel; Attendance: 5,992; Referee: Jeroen Sanders

2 May 2014 Second leg	FC Eindhoven	0 – 2 (1 – 3 agg.)	Sparta Rotterdam	Eindhoven
		Report	Breuer 40' (pen.); Stokkers 89'	Stadium: Jan Louwers Stadion; Referee: Dennis Higler

==== Match B ====
28 April 2014 First leg	Fortuna Sittard	1 – 4	De Graafschap	Sittard
	Gulpen 80'	Report	Kabasele 45', 51'; Koolhof 76'; Vermeij 90'	Stadium: Offermans Joosten Stadion; Attendance: 4,893; Referee: Jeroen Manschot

2 May 2014 Second leg	De Graafschap	3 – 1 (7 – 2 agg.)	Fortuna Sittard	Doetinchem
	Koolhof 65'; Will 79'; Vermeij 87'	Report	Linssen 84'	Stadium: De Vijverberg; Attendance: 5350; Referee: Eric Braamhaar

=== Second round ===
==== Match C ====
8 May 2014 First leg	Sparta Rotterdam	1-0	NEC Nijmegen	Rotterdam

11 May 2014 Second leg	NEC Nijmegen	1-3 (1-4 agg.)	Sparta Rotterdam	Nijmegen

==== Match D ====
8 May 2014 First leg	VVV-Venlo	1–3	FC Dordrecht	Venlo
	Wolters 56'	Report	Gladon 20'; Vet 84'; Mayele 90'	Stadium: De Koel; Attendance: 6,500; Referee: Bas Nijhuis

11 May 2014 Second leg	FC Dordrecht	2-1 (5-2 agg.)	VVV-Venlo	Dordrecht
	Gladon 6'; Fortes 83'	Report	Reimerink 49'	Stadium: GN Bouw Stadion; Attendance: 3,198; Referee: Kevin Blom

==== Match E ====
8 May 2014 First leg	De Graafschap	0–1	RKC Waalwijk	Doetinchem
		Report	Duits 31'	Stadium: De Vijverberg; Attendance: 7,803; Referee: Dennis Higler

11 May 2014 Second leg	RKC Waalwijk	1-1 (2-1 agg.)	De Graafschap	Waalwijk

==== Match F ====
8 May 2014 First leg	FC Den Bosch	1–3	Excelsior	's-Hertogenbosch
	Quekel 14'	Report	Kruys 69'; Fischer 77'; Vermeulen 90'	Stadium: De Vliert; Attendance: 5,484; Referee: Jochem Kamphuis

11 May 2014 Second leg	Excelsior	2-1 (5-2 agg.)	FC Den Bosch	Rotterdam
		Report		Stadium: Stadion Woudestein

=== Third round ===
==== Match G ====
15 May 2014 First leg	Sparta Rotterdam	2-2	FC Dordrecht

18 May 2014 Second leg	FC Dordrecht	3-1 (5-3 agg.)	Sparta Rotterdam

==== Match H ====
15 May 2014 First leg	Excelsior	2-0	RKC Waalwijk

18 May 2014 Second leg	RKC Waalwijk	2-2 (2-4 agg.)	Excelsior

== Attendances ==
#	Club	Average
1	Willem II	9,211
2	De Graafschap	5,771
3	Sparta	5,571
4	MVV	4,230
5	VVV	4,028
6	Den Bosch	3,606
7	Volendam	3,275
8	Fortuna	2,929
9	Dordrecht	2,911
10	Eindhoven	2,711
11	Emmen	2,690
12	Helmond	2,522
13	Excelsior	2,391
14	Telstar	1,934
15	Achilles	1,493
16	Oss	1,469
17	Jong Ajax	1,237
18	Jong PSV	1,204
19	Almere	1,055
20	Jong Twente	879
