= 2014–15 KNVB Cup =

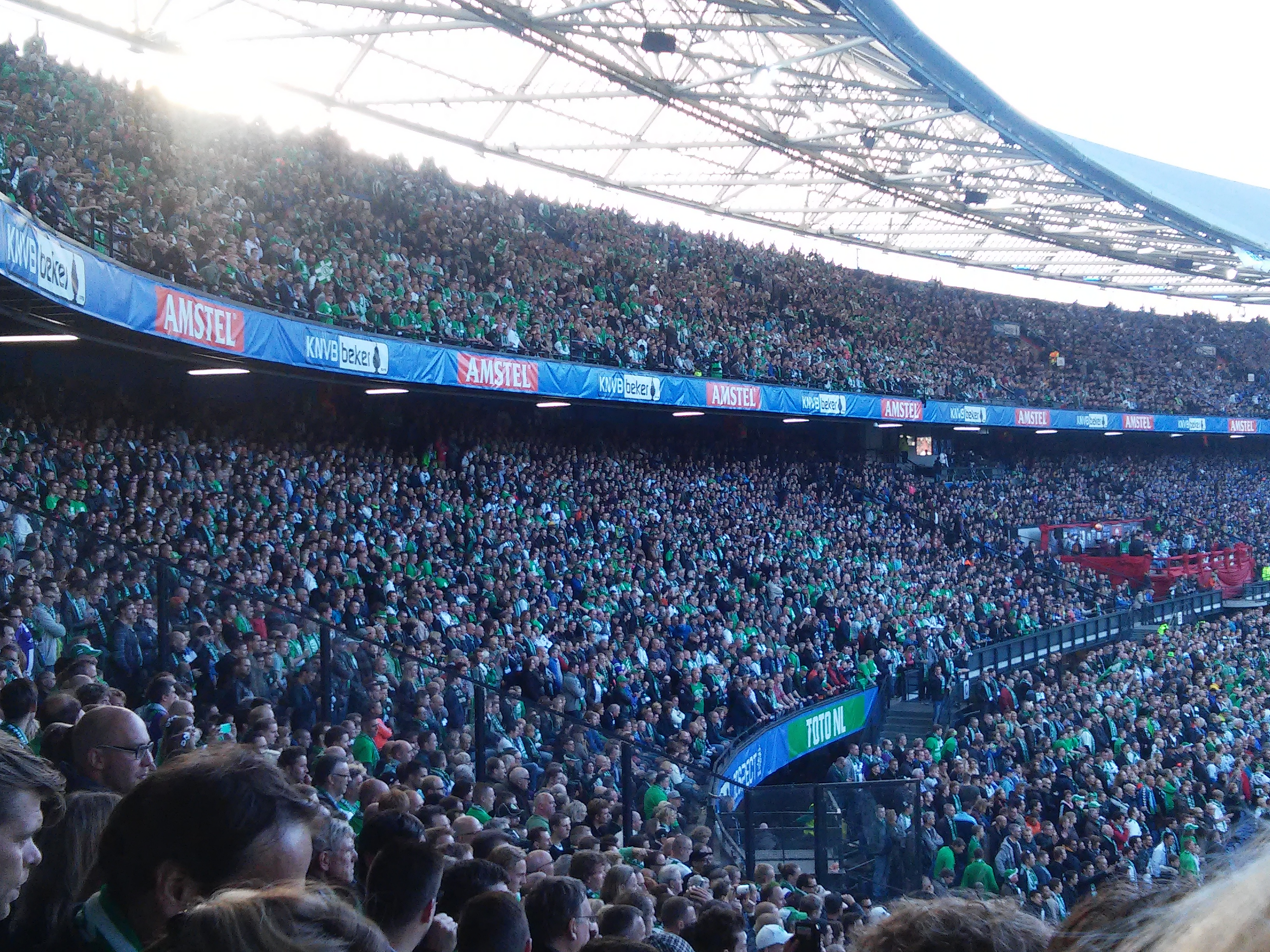
- FC Groningen fans in the Kuip at Rotterdam

Tournament details
- Country: Netherlands

Final positions
- Champions: FC Groningen (1st title)
- Runners-up: PEC Zwolle

Tournament statistics
- Top goal scorer(s): Arkadiusz Milik (8 goals)

The 2014–15 KNVB Cup tournament was the 97th edition of the Dutch national football annual knockout tournament for the KNVB Cup. They contested beginning on 27 August 2014 with the matches of Round 1 and ending with the final on 3 May 2015.

FC Groningen successfully pursued its first KNVB Cup title in club history, beating defending champions PEC Zwolle and qualified for the group stage of the 2015–16 UEFA Europa League.

== Calendar ==
The calendar for the 2014–15 KNVB Cup was as follows.

Rounds	Date
First round	27 August 2014
Second round	23–25 September 2014
Third round	28–30 October 2014
Fourth round	16–18 December 2014
Quarter-finals	27–29 January 2015
Semi-finals	7–9 April 2015
Final	3 May 2015

Source: Royal Dutch Football Association

== First round ==
Matches scheduled on 26 & 27 August 2014.

Tie no	Home team	Score	Away team
1	Kozakken Boys (3)	7–0	Stormvogels 28 (6)
2	vv Capelle (3)	3–2 (a.e.t.)	EHC Hoensbroek (5)
3	DOS'37 (5)	6–1	WAVV (6)
4	ZSV (6)	0–4	FC Lisse (3)
5	HBS Craeyenhout (3)	6–1	SV Juliana '31 (4)
6	FVC (4)	1–2	Sportlust '46 (5)
7	ADO '20 (3)	0–1	SVV Scheveningen (3)
8	IJsselmeervogels (3)	1–3	JVC Cuijk (3)
9	ASWH (4)	4–1	HSC '21 (3)
10	Ajax Zaterdag (3)	4–0	De Valk (4)
11	Deltasport (5)	1–0	RKSV Leonidas (3)
12	VV Oude Maas (6)	1–3	SV DOSKO (4)
13	WKE (3)	1–0	ZVV Pelikaan (5)
14	Flevo Boys (4)	6–2	Haaglandia (4)
15	BVV Barendrecht (3)	2–1 (a.e.t.)	RKSV De Ster (6)
16	SC Feyenoord II (7)	2–4 (a.e.t.)	ASV De Dijk (4)
17	MSC (4)	1–2	ONS Boso Sneek (3)
18	VV De Bataven (4)	1–3	SV Urk (4)
19	JOS Watergraafsmeer (4)	2–1	VV Noordwijk (4)
20	EVV (3)	4–0	SC Spirit '30 (6)
21	FC Lienden (3)	0–1	Excelsior Maassluis (3)

== Second round ==
Matches scheduled on 23 & 24 September 2014.

23 September 2014	Rijnsburgse Boys (3)	0–3	Sparta Rotterdam (2)	Rijnsburg
18:00			Dogan 19'; Mahmudov 71'; Verhaar 73'	Stadium: Sportpark Middelmors; Referee: Jeroen Manschot

23 September 2014	vv Capelle (3)	0–1	FC Volendam (2)	Capelle aan den IJssel
18:00			Brands 78'	Stadium: Sportpark 't Slot; Referee: Davy Otto

23 September 2014	SVV Scheveningen (3)	4–1	FC Lisse (3)	The Hague
18:00	Koorndijk 24'; Peters 65', 68'; Aldoğan 85'		Monteny 83'	Stadium: Sportpark Houtrust; Referee: F A Van Herk

23 September 2014	VVSB (3)	1–2	Vitesse Arnhem (1)	Noordwijkerhout
18:00	van der Slot 71'		Traoré 20'; Ibarra 90+1'	Stadium: Sportpark De Boekhorst; Referee: Richard Martens

23 September 2014	SV Spakenburg (3)	3–4	NAC Breda (1)	Bunschoten
19:30	Tol 17'; Buijtenhuis 70' de Lange 79'		Matić 21' de Kamps 43'; Seuntjens 64'; Sarpong 74'	Stadium: Sportpark De Westmaat; Referee: Martin van den Kerkhof

23 September 2014	Ajax Zaterdag (3)	2–2 (a.e.t.) (3–5 p)	N.E.C. (2)	Amsterdam
20:00	Eloisghiri 31'; Metzemaekers 98'		Ars 22'; Jahanbakhsh 102'	Stadium: Sportpark De Toekomst; Attendance: 348; Referee: Erwin Blank
	Penalties
	Cameron (penalty scored); Danso (penalty scored); Metzemaekers (penalty missed) van Zoolingen (penalty scored)		Daemen (penalty scored); Jahanbakhsh (penalty scored) van Eijden (penalty scored); Appiah (penalty scored); Breinburg (penalty scored)

23 September 2014	Almere City (2)	2–2 (a.e.t.) (2–0 p)	ADO Den Haag (1)	Almere
20:00	Janssen 65', 112'		van Duinen 43'; Kristensen 117'	Stadium: Mitsubishi Forklift Stadion; Attendance: 1.945; Referee: Egbert Mulder
	Penalties
	Janssen (penalty scored); Serrarens (penalty missed); Boldewijn (penalty missed); Salasiwa (penalty missed); Oost (penalty scored)		Kristensen (penalty missed); Meijers (penalty missed); Zuiverloon (penalty missed); Malone (penalty missed)

23 September 2014	Deltasport (5)	2–1	Willem II (1)	Vlaardingen
20:00	Boulfalfal 36', 90+1'		Sahar 53'	Stadium: Sportpark Broekpolder

23 September 2014	Excelsior Maassluis (3)	1–4	FC Emmen (2)	Maassluis
20:00	Vink 32'		Rozema 20'; Peters 60'; Almeida 83'; Bergkamp 87'	Stadium: Sportpark Dijkpolder; Referee: Christiaan Bax

23 September 2014	Flevo Boys (4)	1–0	DOS'37 (5)	Emmeloord
20:00	de Klein 22'			Stadium: Sportpark De Ervenbos

23 September 2014	HHC Hardenberg (3)	1–0	RKC Waalwijk (2)	Hardenberg
20:00	Penterman 57'			Stadium: Sportpark de Boshoek

23 September 2014	Kozakken Boys (3)	1–2 (a.e.t.)	Sportlust '46 (5)	Werkendam
20:00	Irilmazbilek 51'		van Baaren 74'; Demeijer 100' (pen.)	Stadium: Sportpark De Zwaaier; Referee: Sander de Brito Roque

23 September 2014	ONS Boso Sneek (3)	0–3	FC Dordrecht (1)	Sneek
20:00			Lieder 12'; Koolwijk 35' (pen.); Pisas 71'	Stadium: Zuidersportpark; Referee: Stijn Berben

23 September 2014	VVV-Venlo (2)	0–0 (a.e.t.) (4–2 p)	FC Eindhoven (2)	Venlo
20:00				Stadium: De Koel; Attendance: 2,323; Referee: Danny Makkelie
	Penalties
	Khalouta (penalty missed); Gijzen (penalty scored); Kruijsen (penalty scored); Schroyen (penalty scored) van Crooij (penalty scored)		Nieveld (penalty missed); Deschilder (penalty scored); Sleegers (penalty missed); Gunst (penalty scored)

23 September 2014	Roda JC Kerkrade (2)	2–1	SC Heerenveen (1)	Kerkrade
20:45	Cicilia 24'; Paulissen 86'		Thorsby 85'	Stadium: Parkstad Limburg Stadion; Attendance: 9,276; Referee: Tom van Sichem

24 September 2014	AFC (3)	0–2	SBV Excelsior (1)	Amsterdam
18:00				Stadium: Sportpark Goed Genoeg

24 September 2014	ASV De Dijk (4)	4–7 (a.e.t.)	Fortuna Sittard (2)	Amsterdam
18:00	21' Elaakel; 32' Kaars; 79' Water; 90+2' Lindenbergh		12' Janssen; 15' Briels; 57' Voorn; 87', 95' Conneh; 115' Vlug; 117' Waalkens	Stadium: Sportpark Schellingwoude

24 September 2014	HBS Craeyenhout (3)	1–2	Heracles Almelo (1)	The Hague
18:00				Stadium: Sportpark Daal en Bergselaan

24 September 2014	SV DOSKO (4)	0–1	De Graafschap (2)
18:00

24 September 2014	JOS Watergraafsmeer (4)	0–9	Ajax (1)	Amsterdam
19:30			Milik 22', 26', 62', 82', 87', 88'; Andersen 24'; Kishna 64'; Menig 70'	Stadium: Olympic_Stadium

24 September 2014	ASWH (4)	2–3	WKE (3)	Hendrik-Ido-Ambacht
21:00				Stadium: Sportpark Schildman

24 September 2014	BVV Barendrecht (3)	1–4	FC Groningen (1)	Barendrecht
21:00				Stadium: Sportpark De Bongerd

24 September 2014	De Treffers (3)	2–1 (a.e.t.)	SC Telstar (2)	Groesbeek
21:00				Stadium: Sportpark Zuid

24 September 2014	EVV (3)	0–1	AZ (1)	Echt-Susteren
21:00				Stadium: portpark "In De Bandert"

24 September 2014	FC Den Bosch (2)	0–4	SC Cambuur (1)	's-Hertogenbosch
21:00				Stadium: de Vliert

24 September 2014	JVC Cuijk (3)	1–2	GVVV (3)	Cuijk
21:00				Stadium: Sportpark De Groenendijkse

24 September 2014	MVV Maastricht (2)	4–3 (a.e.t.)	Helmond Sport (2)	Maastricht
21:00				Stadium: De Geusselt

24 September 2014	PEC Zwolle (1)	3–2	FC Oss (2)	Zwolle
21:00				Stadium: IJsseldelta Stadion

24 September 2014	SV Urk (4)	2–1	VV UNA (3)	Urk
21:00				Stadium: De Vormt

24 September 2014	Go Ahead Eagles (1)	2–0	Feyenoord (1)	Deventer
21:45				Stadium: Adelaarshorst

25 September 2014	Achilles '29 (2)	1–3	FC Twente (1)	Groesbeek
19:30				Stadium: Sportpark De Heikant

25 September 2014	PSV (1)	2–0	FC Utrecht (1)	Eindhoven
20:45	Willems 2'; Y.Cortie 18' (o.g.)			Stadium: Philips Stadion; Attendance: 18,000; Referee: Eric Braamhaar

== Third round ==
The matches took place on 28, 29 and 30 October 2014.

28 October 2014	SV Urk (4)	0–4	Ajax (1)	De Vormt, Urk
18:30			Lerin Duarte 34'; Arkadiusz Milik 37' (pen.), 40'; Richairo Zivkovic 85'

28 October 2014	De Graafschap (2)	4–1	SV Deltasport (5)	De Vijverberg, Doetinchem
20:00	Karim Tarfi 26'; Jan Lammers 40'; Robin Pröpper 64'; Jeroen Meurs 67'		Reduan Boulfalfal 50'

28 October 2014	Fortuna Sittard (2)	2–3 (a.e.t.)	NAC Breda (1)	Offermans Joosten Stadion, Sittard
20:00	Seku Conneh 50' (pen.); Jordi Baur 58'		Mats Seuntjens 4'; Adnane Tighadouini 45' (pen.); Erik Falkenburg 95'

28 October 2014	Heracles Almelo (1)	6–2	FC Emmen (2)	Polman Stadion, Almelo
20:00	Oussama Tannane 17', 27', 36', 66', 78'; Bryan Linssen 64'		Tim Siekman 35'; Alexander Bannink 39'

28 October 2014	VVV-Venlo (2)	2–0	MVV Maastricht (2)	De Koel, Venlo
20:00	Vito van Crooy 38'; Melvin Platje 69'

28 October 2014	Vitesse Arnhem (1)	2–1	FC Dordrecht (1)	GelreDome, Arnhem
20:45	Marko Vejinović 45' (pen.); Denys Oliynyk 81'		Ricky van Haaren 83'

29 October 2014	Almere City (2)	1–5	PSV (1)	Mitsubishi Forklift Stadion, Almere
18:30	Sander Keller 43'		Luciano Narsingh 17'; Georginio Wijnaldum 49', 86'; Jürgen Locadia 70', 73'

29 October 2014	SC Cambuur (1)	2–0 (a.e.t.)	SVV Scheveningen (3)	Cambuur Stadion, Leeuwarden
20:00	Bartholomew Ogbeche 105'; Bob Schepers 120'

29 October 2014	FC Volendam (2)	3–0	Sportlust '46 (5)	Kras Stadion, Volendam
20:00	Henk Veerman 26', 47', 64'

29 October 2014	Flevo Boys (4)	1–8	FC Groningen (1)	Sportpark Ervenbos, Emmeloord
20:00	Paul Bergtop 44'		Danny Hoesen 22'; Yoell van Nieff 28'; Michael de Leeuw 40', 67', 70', 72'; Dino Islamović 66'; Johan Kappelhof 90'

29 October 2014	GVVV (3)	0–5	AZ (1)	Sportpark Panhuis, Veenendaal
20:00			Nemanja Gudelj 9'; Jeffrey Gouweleeuw 17'; Viktor Elm 80'; Robert Mühren 82'; Mikhail Rosheuvel 90'

29 October 2014	PEC Zwolle (1)	6–1	HHC Hardenberg (3)	IJsseldelta Stadion, Zwolle
20:00	Thomas Lam 12', 13', 31'; Thanasis Karagounis 37'; Bart van Hintum 52'; Ben Rienstra 78'		Sargon Gouriye 33'

29 October 2014	Go Ahead Eagles (1)	0–0 (a.e.t.) (4–5 p)	FC Twente (1)	De Adelaarshorst, Deventer
20:45

30 October 2014	De Treffers (3)	1–3	N.E.C. (2)	Sportpark Zuid, Groesbeek
18:30	Wessel can der Horst 72'		Sjoerd Ars 45' (pen.), 82'; Anthony Limbombe 90'

30 October 2014	WKE (3)	0–3	Excelsior (1)	Grote Geert, Emmen
20:00			Carlo de Reuver 38'; Ninos Gouriye 67'; Jordan Rolly Botaka 90'

30 October 2014	Roda JC Kerkrade (2)	4–2 (a.e.t.)	Sparta Rotterdam (2)	Parkstad Limburg Stadion, Kerkrade
20:45	Marc Höcher 30', 90', 119'; Guy Ramos 116'		Paul Gladon 8' (pen.), 51'

== Fourth round ==
The matches took place on 16, 17, 18 December 2014 and 20 January 2015.

16 December 2014	VVV-Venlo (2)	0–1	PEC Zwolle (1)	De Koel, Venlo
18:30			Tomáš Necid 12'

16 December 2014	Heracles Almelo (1)	0–3	SC Cambuur (1)	Polman Stadion, Almelo
20:45			Mohamed El Makrini 14', 52'; Calvin Mac-Intosch 61'

17 December 2014	De Graafschap (2)	2–4	FC Twente (1)	De Vijverberg, Doetinchem
18:30	Vincent Vermeij 12'; Andreas Bjelland 79' (o.g.)		Jesús Corona 40', 61'; Hakim Ziyech 45', 69'

17 December 2014	AZ (1)	2–1	N.E.C. (2)	AFAS Stadion, Alkmaar
19:00	Muamer Tanković 33', 63' (pen.)		Anthony Limbombe 66'

17 December 2014	FC Groningen (1)	3–0	FC Volendam (2)	Euroborg, Groningen
19:30	Mimoun Mahi 44'; Nick van der Velden 71' (pen.); Michael de Leeuw 89'

18 December 2014	Excelsior (1)	6–0	NAC Breda (1)	Stadion Woudestein, Rotterdam
18:30	Adil Auassar 8', 63'; Sepp De Roover 18' (o.g.); Tom van Weert 69'; Kevin Vermeulen 84'; Rick Kruys 87'

18 December 2014	Ajax (1)	0–4	Vitesse Arnhem (1)	Amsterdam Arena, Amsterdam
20:45			Bertrand Traoré 22', 58'; Zakaria Labyad 45'; Valeri Kazaishvili 61'

20 January 2015	Roda JC Kerkrade (2)	3–2 (a.e.t.)	PSV (1)	Parkstad Limburg Stadion, Kerkrade
20:00	Tom Van Hyfte 5'; Edwin Gyasi 74'; Hicham Faik 98'		Luuk de Jong 17', 83'

== Quarter-finals ==
27 January 2015	SC Cambuur (1)	2–3 (a.e.t.)	PEC Zwolle (1)	Cambuur Stadion, Leeuwarden
18:30	Narsingh 56', 61'		Lam 25'; Thomas 51'; Lukoki 109'	Attendance: 7,834; Referee: Serdar Gözübüyük

27 January 2015	FC Twente (1)	3–0	AZ (1)	De Grolsch Veste, Enschede
20:45	Castaignos 24'; Ziyech 44', 62'			Attendance: 18,600; Referee: Kevin Blom

28 January 2015	Roda JC Kerkrade (2)	1–4	Excelsior (1)	Parkstad Limburg Stadion, Kerkrade
18:30	Jansen 77'		Gouriye 16'; Mattheij 30'; Van Weert 34', 84'	Attendance: 6,125; Referee: Reinold Wiedemeijer

28 January 2015	FC Groningen (1)	4–0	Vitesse Arnhem (1)	Euroborg, Groningen
20:45	Chery 63'; De Leeuw 66'; Van Nieff 76'; Kieftenbeld 78'			Attendance: 12,458; Referee: Björn Kuipers

== Semi-finals ==
7 April 2015	FC Twente (1)	1 - 1 (a.e.t.) (2–4 p)	PEC Zwolle (1)	De Grolsch Veste, Enschede
20:45	Mokhtar 87'		82' Brama

8 April 2015	FC Groningen (1)	3 - 0	Excelsior (1)	Euroborg, Groningen
20:45	Hateboer 40'; Rusnák 53'; Chery 88'

== Final ==
3 May 2015
18:00

PEC Zwolle	0–2	FC Groningen
		Rusnák 64', 75'

De Kuip, Rotterdam
Attendance: 50,000
Referee: Richard Liesveld

== Trivia ==
None of the Big Three advanced to the quarter-finals; the fourth occurrence in fifty years (after the 1974-75, 1981-82 and 2008-09 campaigns).
