= Nick de Jong =

Nick de Jong may refer to:

- Nick de Jong (footballer) (born 1989), Dutch footballer
- Nick de Jong (sailor) (born 1942), Dutch sailor
