= Koolhof =

Koolhof (Dutch pronunciation: [ˈkoːlɦɔf]) is a Dutch surname. Notable people with the surname include:

- Dean Koolhof (born 1994), Dutch footballer
- Jurrie Koolhof (1960–2019), Dutch former football player and manager
- Wesley Koolhof (born 1989), Dutch tennis player
