= Zuidwolde, Drenthe =

Zuidwolde
- Village
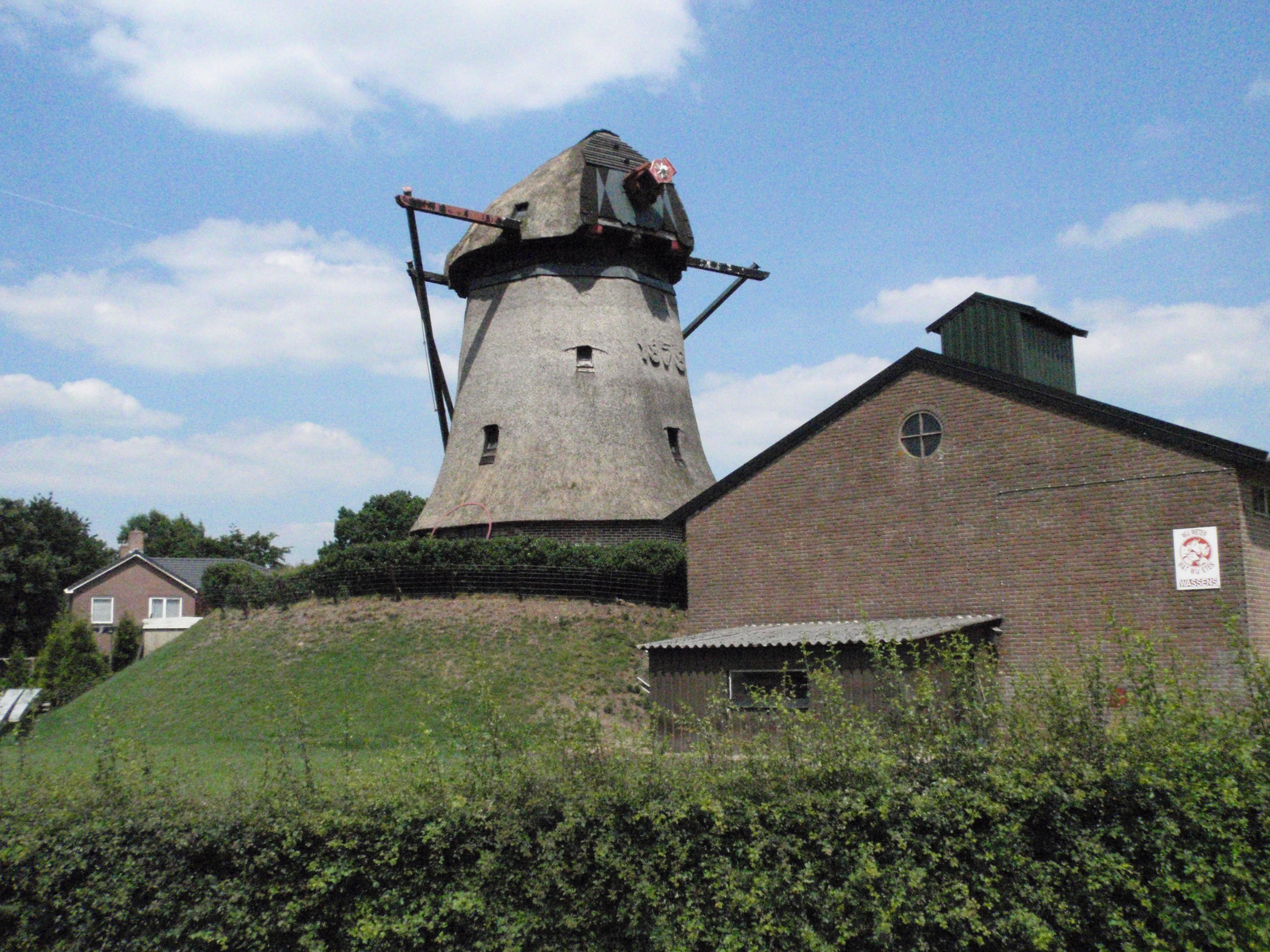
- Windmill De Vlijt, Zuidwolde

- Flag Coat of arms

- Location in province of Drenthe in the Netherlands Zuidwolde (Netherlands)
- Coordinates: 52°40′17″N 6°25′40″E
- Country: Netherlands
- Province: Drenthe
- Municipality: De Wolden

Area
  - Total: 23.05 km^{2} (8.90 sq mi)
- Elevation: 11 m (36 ft)

Population (2021)
  - Total: 6,385
  - Density: 277.0/km^{2} (717.4/sq mi)
- Time zone: UTC+1 (CET)
  - Summer (DST): UTC+2 (CEST)
- Postal code: 7920, 7921
- Dialing code: 0528

Zuidwolde is a village in the Dutch province of Drenthe. It is located in the municipality of De Wolden, about 7 km southwest of Hoogeveen. The village was integrated with Ruinen in 2008.

Zuidwolde was a separate municipality until 1998, when it became part of De Wolden.

Zuidwolde is the site of the De Vlijt, a windmill from the 1800s.

== Notable people ==
- Bart de Groot (born 1990), footballer
- Henk Hulzebos (born 1950), equestrian
- Wouter Marinus (born 1995), footballer
- Jan Vayne (born 1966), pianist

== Gallery ==
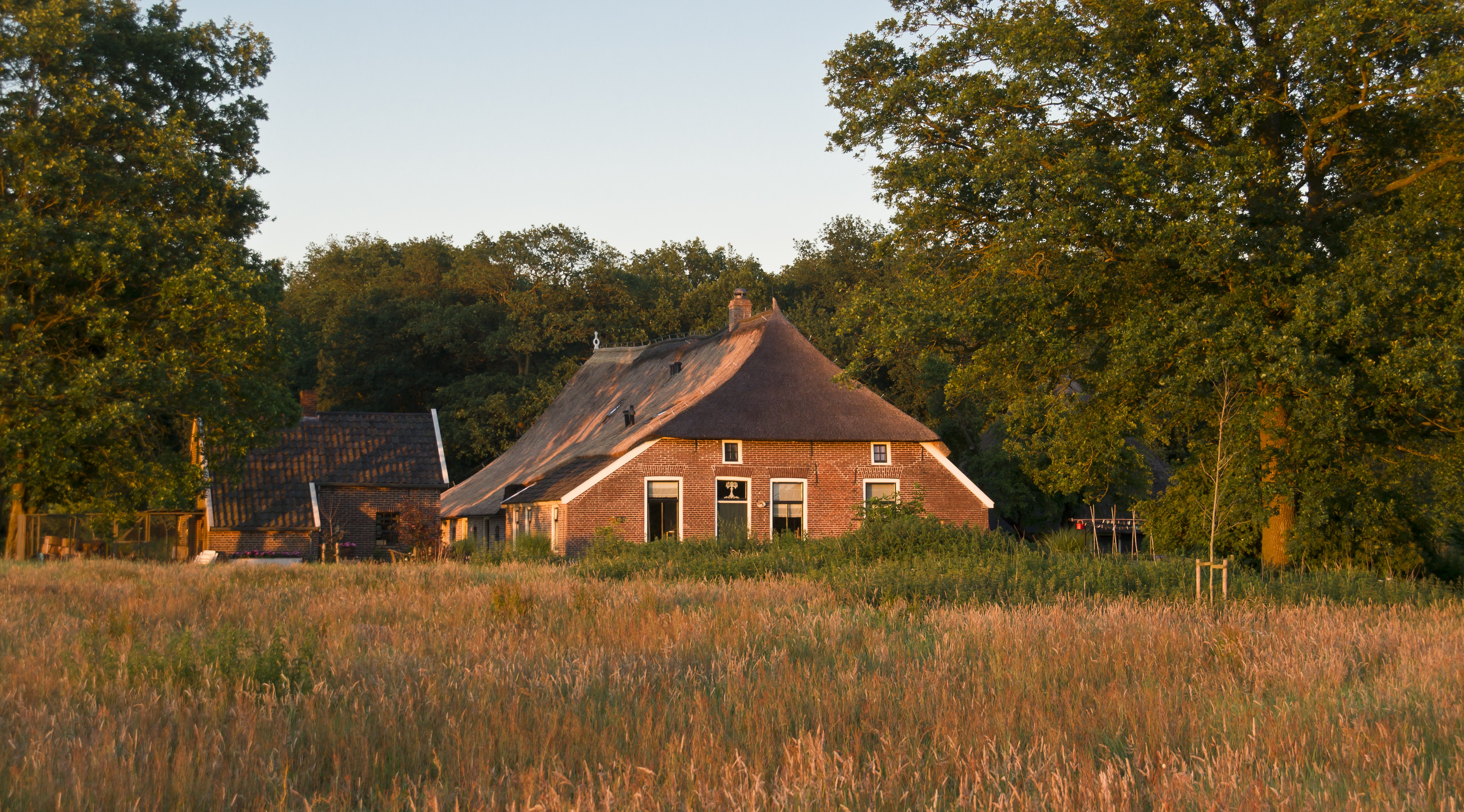
Farm in Zuidwolde

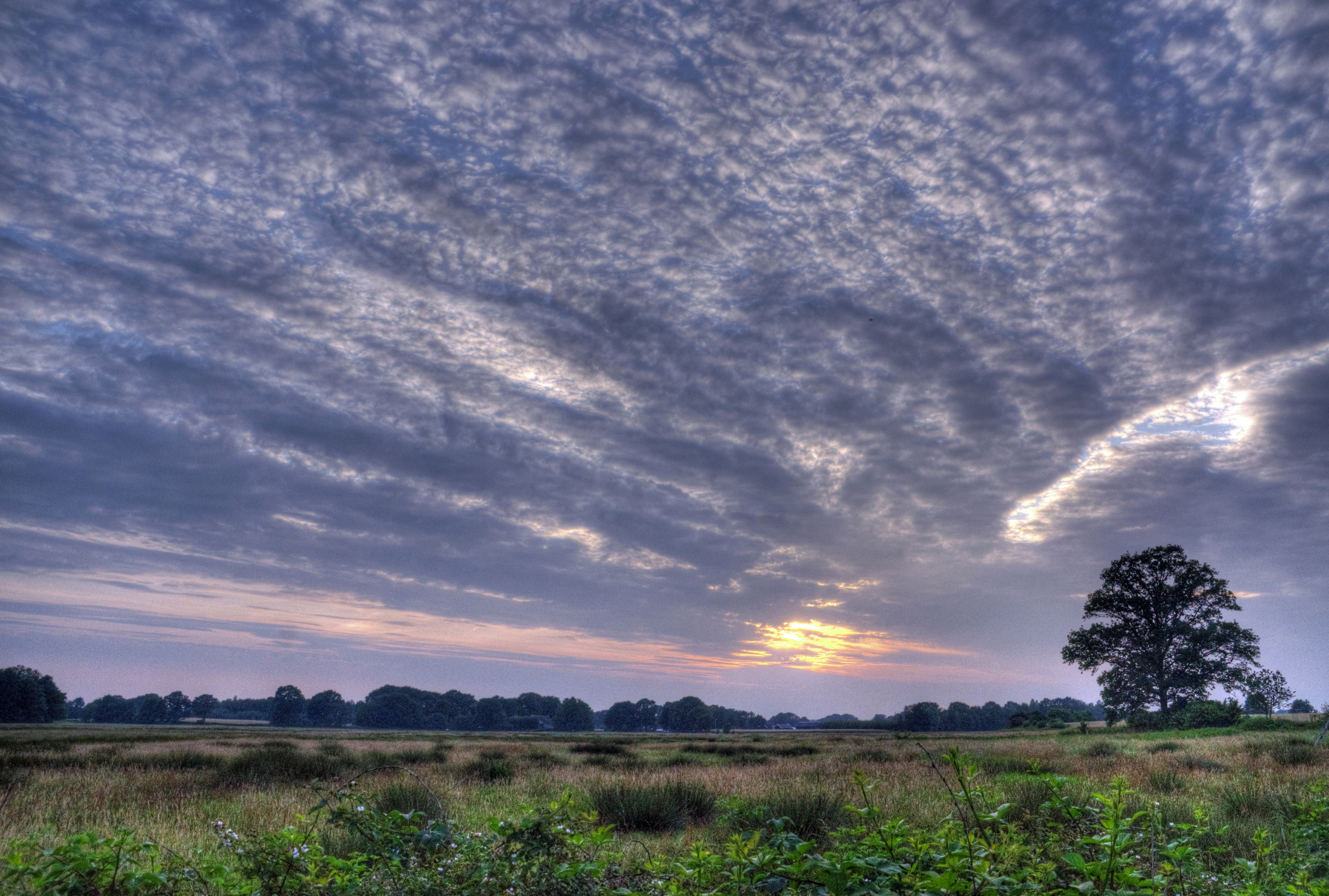
Sunset

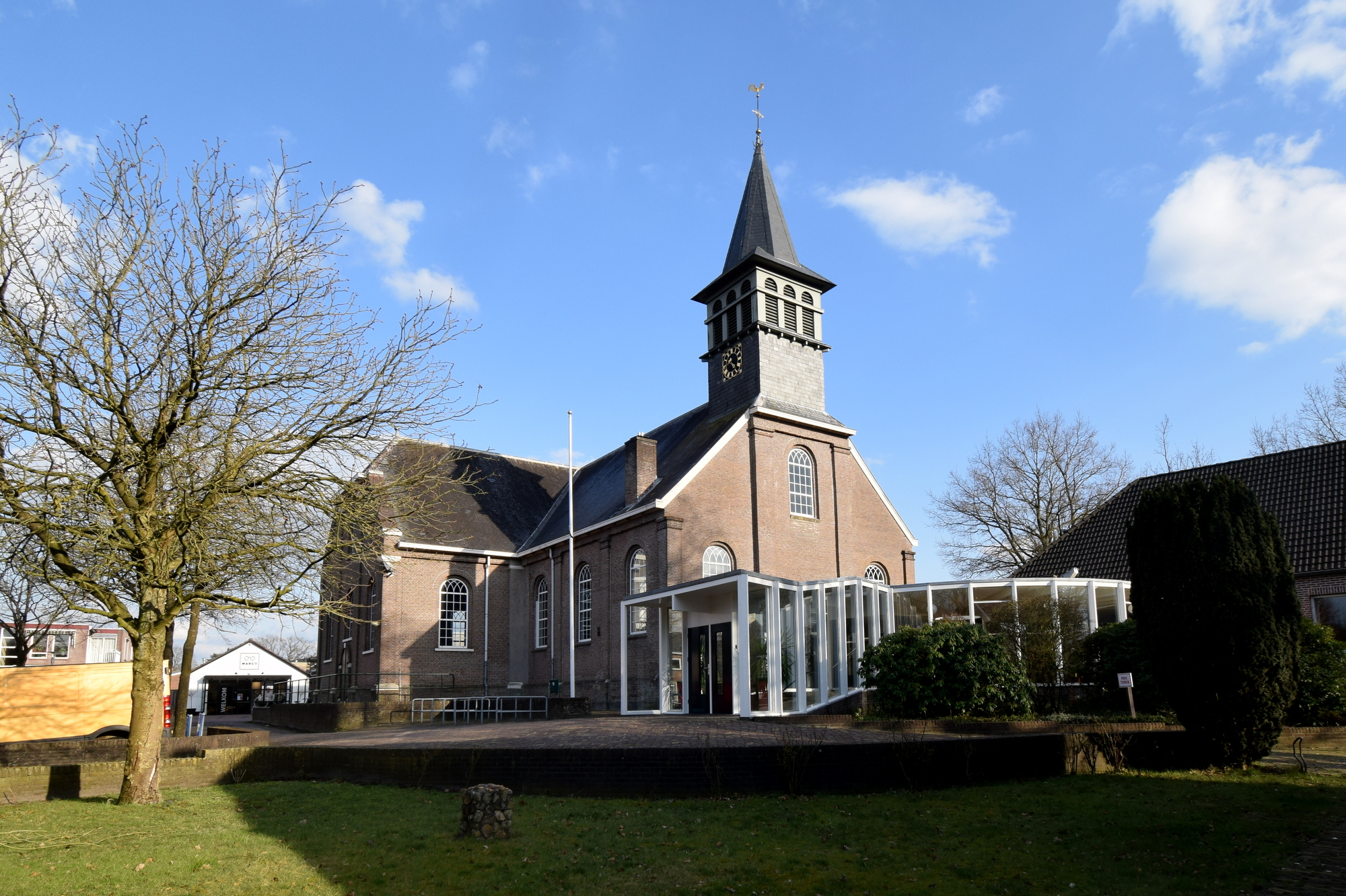
Protestant church

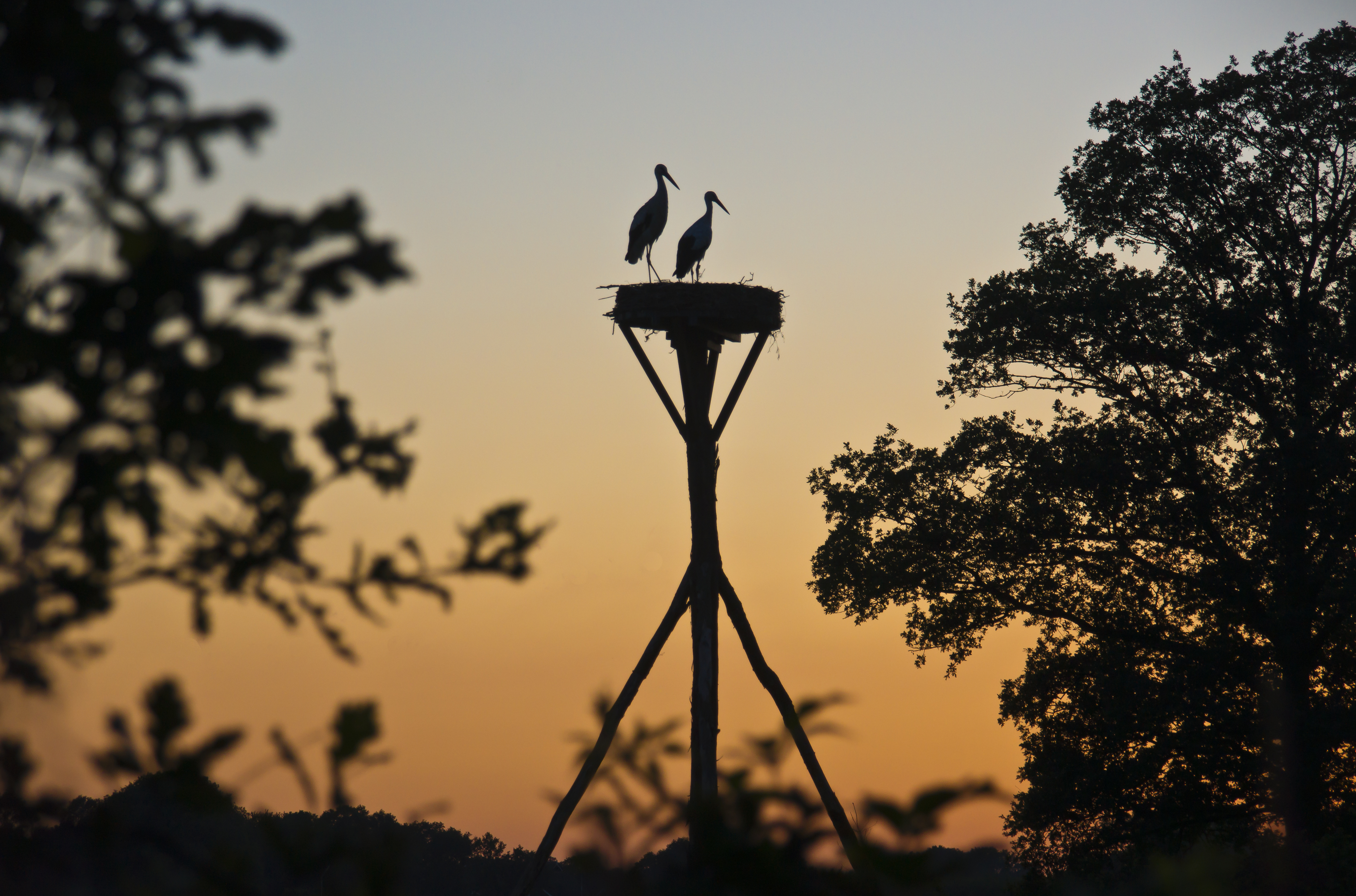
Two storks
