= Nick de Jong (footballer) =

Dutch footballer

Personal information
- Full name: Nick de Jong
- Date of birth: 26 September 1989 (age 37)
- Place of birth: Hoofddorp, Netherlands
- Position: Forward

Youth career
- SV Hoofddorp
- 2006–2008: AZ

Senior career*
| Years | Team | Apps | (Gls) |
| 2008–2010 | Utrecht | 3 | (1) |
| 2010–2011 | Hoek | | |
- * Club domestic league appearances and goals as of 11 August 2010

Nick de Jong (born 26 September 1989) is a Dutch former professional footballer who played as a forward.

== Career ==
De Jong was born in Hoofddorp. He made his debut for FC Utrecht on 5 October 2008, in a 3–0 home victory over FC Twente. He scored the third goal of the match, making him the third Utrecht player in a few months time to score in his debut (after Randy Wolters and Rafael Uiterloo).

On 28 May 2010, de Jong left FC Utrecht and signed for HSV Hoek.

== Career statistics ==
As of 22 January 2010

Appearances and goals by club, season and competition
| Club | Season | League | | |
| Club | Season | Division | Apps | Goals |
|---|---|---|---|---|
| Utrecht | 2008–09 | Eredivisie | 3 | 1 |
| Total | | | 3 | 1 |
