= Henk Hulzebos =

Dutch equestrian

Personal information
- Full name: Heinrich Hulzebos
- Nationality: Dutch
- Born: 11 April 1950 (age 76) Zuidwolde, Netherlands

Sport
- Sport: Equestrian

Henk Hulzebos (born 11 April 1950) is a Dutch equestrian. He represented Austria in two events at the 1976 Summer Olympics in Montreal.
