= De Vlijt, Zuidwolde =

Windmill in Zuidwolde, Netherlands

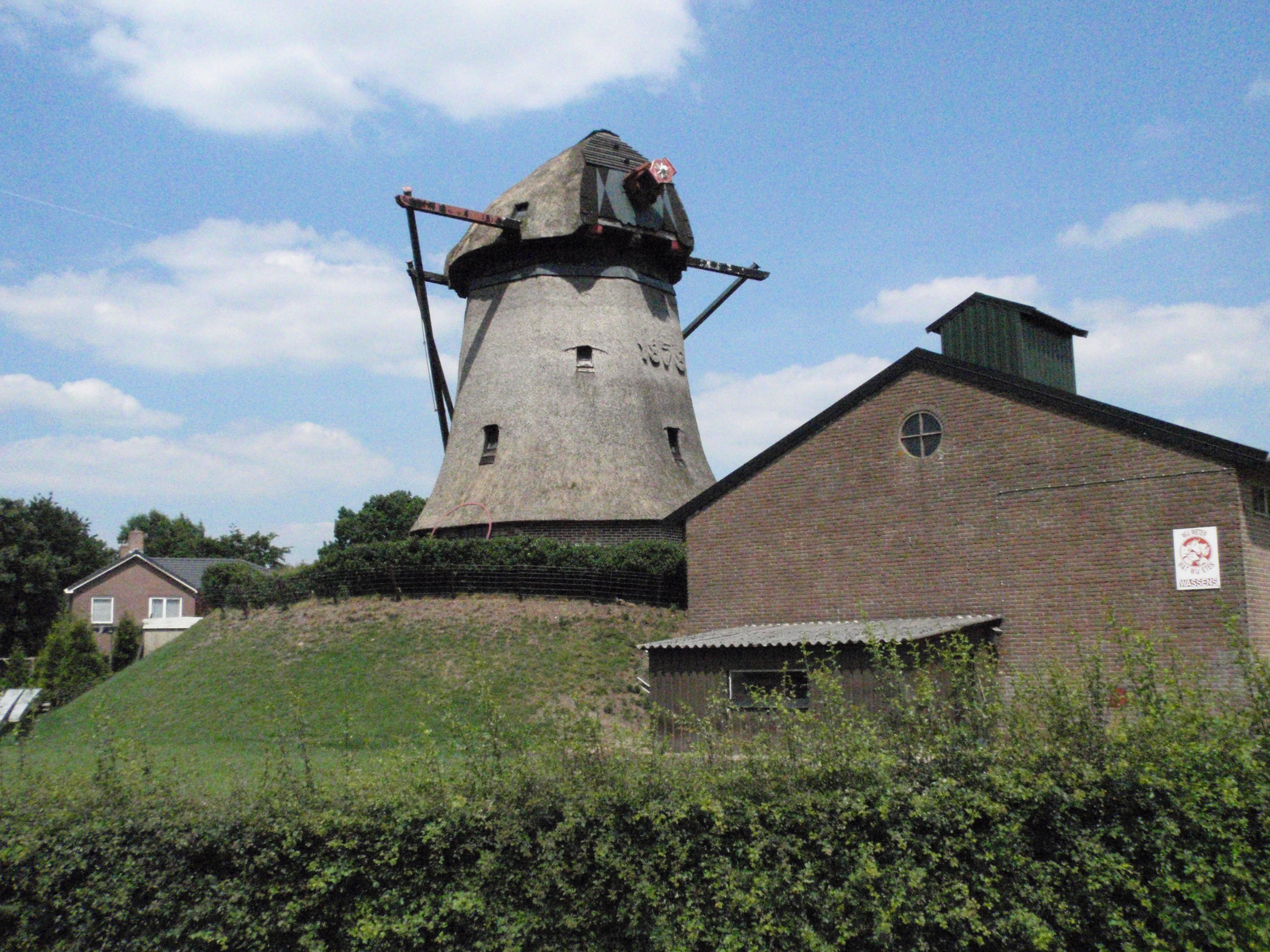
- De Vlijt, June 2008
- Interactive map of De Vlijt, Zuidwolde

Origin
- Mill name: De Vlijt; Hoop van Zegen
- Mill location: Molenstraat 12, 7921 AM Zuidwolde
- Coordinates: 52°40′06″N 6°25′34″E
- Operator: Private
- Year built: 1878

Information
- Purpose: Corn mill
- Type: Smock mill
- Storeys: Three-storey smock
- Base storeys: One-storey base
- Smock sides: Eight sides
- No. of sails: Four sails
- Type of sails: Common sails
- Windshaft: Cast iron
- Winding: Tailpole and winch
- No. of pairs of millstones: One pair
- Size of millstones: 1.50 metres (4 ft 11 in) diameter

De Vlijt (English: The Diligence), formerly known as Hoop van Zegen, is a smock mill in Zuidwolde, Drenthe, Netherlands, which has been conserved. The mill was built in 1878 and is listed as a Rijksmonument, number 41099.

== History ==
The first windmill on this site was a post mill that was built in 1731. It burnt down in 1877. To replace it, the drainage mill Zuidplasmolen I was moved to Zoudwolde. It had stood between Moordrecht and Nieuwerkerk aan den IJssel, South Holland. The move was carried out by millwright C H Schiller of Dalfsen, Overijssel. In 1940, the sails were fitted with streamlined leading edges. This was the work of millwright Bisschop of Dalfsen. The mill stopped working after the Second World War, but a restoration was carried out in 1960, being completed in September.

In 1980-81 a further restoration of the mill was carried out. On 1 April 2001, there was a fire at the mill although prompt attendance by the fire brigade saved the mill. The sailstocks were removed on 5 May 2004. As of November 2009, there are no plans to return the mill to working order.

== Description ==
De Wachter is what the Dutch describe as an "achtkante beltmolen". It is a three-storey smock mill on a single-storey brick base. There is no stage, a mound of earth throw up against the base provides access for the sails. The smock and cap are thatched. The mill is winded by a tailpole and winch. The four Common sails had a span of 21.80 metres (71 ft 6 in). They had streamlined leading edges. The sails were carried in a cast-iron windshaft which was cast by Enthiizen in 1864. The windshaft also carries the brake wheel which has 71 cogs. This drives the wallower (38 cogs) at the top of the upright shaft. At the bottom of the upright shaft, the great spur wheel, which has 110 cogs, drives the 1.50 metres (4 ft 11 in) diameter French Burr stones via a lantern pinion stone nut with 35 staves.

== Public access ==
De Vlijt is open to the public by appointment.
