= Mike Koenders =

German footballer

Personal information
- Date of birth: 9 May 1992 (age 34)
- Place of birth: Nordhorn, Germany
- Height: 1.90 m (6 ft 3 in)
- Position: Defender

Youth career
- Borussia Neuenhaus
- FC Emmen
- SC Heerenveen

Senior career*
Years	Team	Apps	(Gls)
2011–2012	FC Emmen	25	(0)
2012–2013	PEC Zwolle	0	(0)
2013–2014	SC Genemuiden		
2014–2016	TuS Lingen	30	(4)
2016–2017	BV Cloppenburg	19	(1)
2017–2022	VfB Homberg	137	(6)
2022–2024	Ratingen 04/19	49	(0)
- * Club domestic league appearances and goals as of 07:48, 4 July 2024 (UTC)

Mike Koenders (born 9 May 1992) is a German professional footballer who plays as a defender. He formerly played for FC Emmen.
