= Bart de Groot =

Dutch footballer

Personal information
- Full name: Bart de Groot
- Date of birth: 16 April 1990 (age 36)
- Place of birth: Zuidwolde, Netherlands
- Height: 1.88 m (6 ft 2 in)
- Position: Central defender

Youth career
- FC Oldemarkt
- 2002-2010: Heerenveen

Senior career*
Years	Team	Apps	(Gls)
2010–2012	Heerenveen	0	(0)
2010–2012	→ Emmen (loan)	59	(2)
2012–2016	Emmen	40	(2)
2016–2018	Harkemase Boys		
- * Club domestic league appearances and goals as of 6 June 2016

Bart de Groot (born 16 April 1990) is a Dutch retired footballer who played as a midfielder.

== Career ==
De Groot, who was raised in Oldemarkt, first signed professional terms with Heerenveen in 2009. He was loaned and later sold to FC Emmen and joined amateur side Harkemase Boys in 2016. He retired in 2018.
