= Jorrit Kunst =

Dutch footballer

Personal information
- Full name: Jorrit Kunst
- Date of birth: 11 May 1989 (age 37)
- Place of birth: Uithuizermeeden, Netherlands
- Height: 1.78 m (5 ft 10 in)
- Position: Left back

Youth career
- vv Gasselternijveen
- GRC
- 2002–2008: Groningen

Senior career*
Years	Team	Apps	(Gls)
2010–2011	Groningen	0	(0)
2011–2013	Emmen	60	(1)
2013–2016	WKE	78	(1)
2016–2018	Be Quick 1887	53	(0)
2018–2019	IJsselmeervogels	8	(0)
- * Club domestic league appearances and goals as of 9 September 2020

Jorrit Kunst (born 11 May 1989) is a Dutch former footballer who played as a defender. He formerly played professionally for FC Groningen and FC Emmen.
