= Mimoun Eloisghiri =

Dutch footballer

Personal information
- Date of birth: 15 September 1989 (age 37)
- Place of birth: Rotterdam, Netherlands
- Height: 1.81 m (5 ft 11 in)
- Position: Striker

Senior career*
Years	Team	Apps	(Gls)
2008–2009	FC Oss		
2009–2012	Presikhaaf		
2012–2014	PEC Zwolle	3	(0)
2012–2014	Jong PEC Zwolle	30	(10)
2014–2015	Ajax Amateurs	16	(6)
2015–2016	Kozakken Boys	22	(7)
2016–2017	IJsselmeervogels	5	(0)
2017	DUNO		
2018–2019	MASV		
- * Club domestic league appearances and goals as of 12 June 2018

Mimoun Eloisghiri (born 15 September 1989) is a Dutch retired footballer who last played as a striker for amateur side Be Quick Zutphen.

== Club career ==
Eloisghiri made his professional debut for PEC Zwolle on 4 November 2012 against SC Heerenveen but failed to make the grade at Zwolle and joined the amateur team of Ajax. He left them after only one season for Kozakken Boys and moved on for IJsselmeervogels a year later, only to have his season ruined by a back injury. In March 2019 he joined Eendracht Arnhem from MASV.
