= Danny Menting =

Dutch footballer

Personal information
- Full name: Danny Menting
- Date of birth: 5 May 1990 (age 36)
- Place of birth: Groningen, Netherlands
- Height: 1.85 m (6 ft 1 in)
- Position: Midfielder

Team information
- Current team: ACV

Youth career
- Be Quick 1887
- FC Groningen

Senior career*
Years	Team	Apps	(Gls)
2009–2011	FC Groningen	3	(0)
2011–2013	SC Veendam	47	(8)
2013–2014	ACV		
2014–2015	FC Emmen	3	(0)
2015–	ACV	0	(0)
- * Club domestic league appearances and goals as of 10 May 2015 (UTC)

Danny Menting (born 5 May 1990 in Groningen) is a Dutch footballer who currently plays as a midfielder for ACV in the Dutch Topklasse. He formerly played for FC Groningen, SC Veendam and FC Emmen.
