= Randy Wolters =

Dutch footballer

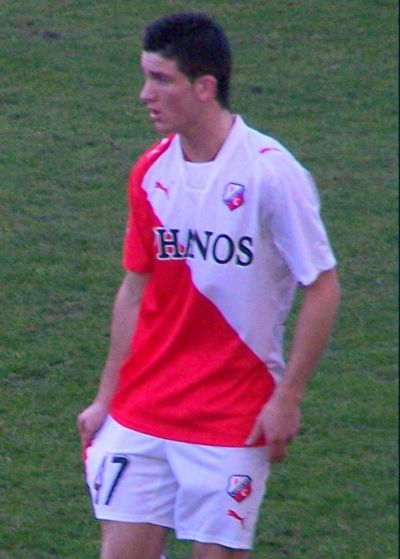

Personal information
- Date of birth: 6 April 1990 (age 36)
- Place of birth: Leiden, Netherlands
- Height: 1.80 m (5 ft 11 in)
- Position: Winger

Team information
- Current team: VV Katwijk
- Number: 17

Youth career
- LVV Lugdunum
- ADO Den Haag
- UVS
- Utrecht

Senior career*
Years	Team	Apps	(Gls)
2008–2011	Utrecht	7	(1)
2011	→ FC Emmen (loan)	0	(0)
2011–2012	FC Emmen	32	(4)
2012–2013	Den Bosch	30	(7)
2013–2015	VVV-Venlo	67	(13)
2015–2017	Go Ahead Eagles	49	(5)
2017	→ ADO Den Haag (loan)	12	(0)
2017–2018	Dundee	9	(0)
2018–2020	NEC	15	(2)
2020–2021	Xanthi	13	(0)
2022	Telstar	13	(0)
2023	Larne	2	(0)
2023–	VV Katwijk	6	(0)
- * Club domestic league appearances and goals as of 18:40, 12 October 2023 (UTC)

Randy Wolters (born 6 April 1990) is a Dutch professional footballer who plays as a winger for VV Katwijk.

== Career ==
Wolters was born in Leiden. He formerly played for FC Utrecht, FC Emmen, FC Den Bosch, VVV-Venlo and Go Ahead Eagles. He made his debut for FC Utrecht in a 1–4 home defeat against VVV-Venlo and scored the only Utrecht goal. He was the first of three Utrecht players who, in a few months time, would score in their debut match (Rafael Uiterloo and Nick de Jong were the other two).

Wolters signed a two-year contract with Scottish Premiership club Dundee in June 2017.

After 2 years at NEC Nijmegen and a short stay in Greece, on 6 January 2022 Wolters signed a six-month contract with Telstar.

Having spent a considerable time training with the club, In March 2023, Randy signed for Northern Ireland premiership club Larne Football Club. Wolters would return to the Netherlands at the end of the season having made two appearances for Larne.

== Career statistics ==
As of match played 12 May 2018

Appearances and goals by club, season and competition
Club	Season	League			National Cup		League Cup		Other		Total	
Club	Season	Division	Apps	Goals	Apps	Goals	Apps	Goals	Apps	Goals	Apps	Goals
Utrecht	2007–08	Eredivisie	7	1	0	0	—		0	0	7	1
Emmen	2010–11	Eerste Divisie	12	1	0	0	—		0	0	12	1
Emmen	2011–12	Eerste Divisie	32	4	1	0	—		0	0	33	4
Emmen	Total		44	5	1	0	—		0	0	45	5
Den Bosch	2012–13	Eerste Divisie	30	7	4	0	—		0	0	34	7
VVV	2013–14	Eerste Divisie	32	7	2	0	—		2 (Note: Appearances in the Eredivisie play-offs)	1	36	8
VVV	2014–15	Eerste Divisie	35	6	3	0	—		4 (Note: Appearances in the Eredivisie play-offs)	1	42	7
VVV	Total		67	13	5	0	—		6	2	78	15
Go Ahead Eagles	2015–16	Eerste Divisie	29	5	1	0	—		6 (Note: Two appearances in the Europa League; four appearances and three goals in the Eredivisie play-offs)	3	36	8
Go Ahead Eagles	2016–17	Eredivisie	20	0	2	1	—		0	0	22	1
Go Ahead Eagles	Total		49	5	3	1	—		6	3	58	9
Dundee	2017–18	Scottish Premiership	9	0	1	0	6	0	—		16	0
Career total			206	31	14	1	6	0	12	5	238	37
