= Marijn Sterk =

Dutch footballer (born 1987)

Personal information
- Full name: Marinus Govert Sterk
- Date of birth: 11 July 1987 (age 39)
- Place of birth: The Hague, Netherlands
- Height: 1.81 m (5 ft 11 in)
- Position: Left-back

Youth career
- VCS
- 2001–2008: Ajax

Senior career*
Years	Team	Apps	(Gls)
2008–2011	Volendam	58	(0)
2011–2013	Emmen	18	(1)
2013–2018	OFC Oostzaan		
2018–2021	Ajax Amateurs	45	(3)
2021–2022	Always Forward Hoorn		
- * Club domestic league appearances and goals

Marijn Sterk (born 11 July 1987) is a Dutch former professional footballer who played as a left-back.

Sterk played in the youth of VCS from The Hague, until he was scouted by Ajax at age 14. In Ajax he went through the youth department until Jong Ajax. Sterk played there until 2008, where he decided to make a transfer to FC Volendam. His professional debut followed on 27 September 2008, in a match against PSV Eindhoven.
