= Kay Velda =

Dutch footballer

Personal information
- Full name: Kay Velda
- Date of birth: 23 June 1990 (age 36)
- Place of birth: Hattem, Netherlands
- Height: 1.80 m (5 ft 11 in)
- Position: Midfielder

Youth career
- VV Hattem
- FC Zwolle
- Vitesse/AGOVV
- PSV

Senior career*
Years	Team	Apps	(Gls)
2010–2013	FC Emmen	70	(2)
2013–2014	De Graafschap	0	(0)
2014–2015	VV WKE Emmen	?	(?)
2015–2018	DVS '33	?	(?)
2018–	SC Genemuiden	?	(?)
- * Club domestic league appearances and goals

Kay Velda (born 23 June 1990) is a Dutch professional footballer who plays as a midfielder for SC Genemuiden. He formerly played for FC Emmen.
