= Bob Schepers =

Dutch footballer

Personal information
- Date of birth: 30 March 1992 (age 34)
- Place of birth: Enschede, Netherlands
- Height: 1.85 m (6 ft 1 in)
- Position: Winger

Team information
- Current team: Blauw Wit '34

Youth career
- Tubanters
- Blauw Wit '34
- Cambuur

Senior career*
Years	Team	Apps	(Gls)
2009–2012	Cambuur	23	(4)
2011–2014	Utrecht	18	(1)
2011–2012	→ Cambuur (loan)	31	(6)
2014	→ Cambuur (loan)	6	(1)
2014–2015	Cambuur	6	(0)
2015–2016	ONS Sneek	24	(1)
2016–	Blauw Wit '34		

International career^{‡}
2009	Netherlands U-17	5	(0)
- * Club domestic league appearances and goals as of 1 July 2016 ‡ National team caps and goals as of 17:53, 26 April 2010 (UTC)

Bob Schepers (born 30 March 1992) is a Dutch footballer who plays as a winger for Dutch lower league side Blauw Wit '34. Schepers represented the Netherlands U-17 team at the 2009 UEFA European Under-17 Football Championship and the 2009 FIFA U-17 World Cup.

== Club career ==
Born in Enschede, Schepers started the 2008–09 season in the youth of SC-Cambuur-Leeuwarden. On 24 February 2009, Schepers signed a three-year deal with the club. He made his debut for Cambuur on 24 April 2009 in a 0–1 defeat against Dordrecht, coming on as a substitute for Sandor van der Heide. He was close to a move to FC Groningen, however the move failed to materialise. On 5 February 2010, he made his first appearance in the starting line-up in a 1–1 draw against AGOVV Apeldoorn. Since then, Schepers established himself in the squad, being in the starting line-up against SBV Excelsior on 22 February 2010 and against RBC Roosendaal on 23 April 2010.

In the 2010 summer transfer window, English Premier League club Everton F.C. tracked Schepers and arranged a trial for him. He was present at the pre-season fixture against Clyde.

On 30 August 2011, Schepers joined Eredivisie side FC Utrecht on a three-year contract with an option to extend for further two years. He returned to his former team Cambuur on a loan deal before the transfer window closed.

In June 2015, after his contract with Cambuur was not extended, Schepers moved to Topklasse side ONS Sneek. His ONS Sneek contract included a release clause allowing him to leave if a professional club would have registered him before 1 September.

In May 2015, it was announced he would return to his youth club Blauw Wit '34.

== International career ==
Schepers was active at the 2009 UEFA European Under-17 Football Championship for the Netherlands, playing as a left winger. Schepers was surprised he made the team stating that while he played for Cambuur, the other players all played for big clubs like Ajax, Feyenoord, and Arsenal. In the group stages, Schepers came on as a substitute in the 2–1 victory over Turkey. In the 2–1 semi-final victory over Switzerland, Schepers was in the starting line-up. In the final against hosts Germany, Schepers again came on as a substitute, however they lost the match 1–2 after extra time.

Schepers was also a member of the Dutch squad for the 2009 FIFA U-17 World Cup in Nigeria, although the team failed to progress beyond the group stage. Schepers played two matches at the tournament, coming on as a substitute against Iran and Colombia.

== Statistics ==
As of 26 May 2012

Club performance			League		Cup		Continental		Total	
Season	Club	League	Apps	Goals	Apps	Goals	Apps	Goals	Apps	Goals
Netherlands			League		KNVB Cup		Europe		Total	
2008–09	SC Cambuur	Eerste Divisie	1	0	-	-	-	-	1	0
2009–10	SC Cambuur	Eerste Divisie	6	0	1	0	-	-	7	0
2010–11	SC Cambuur	Eerste Divisie	16	4	1	0	-	-	17	4
2011–12	SC Cambuur	Eerste Divisie	31	6	1	0	-	-	32	6
2012–13	FC Utrecht	Eredivisie	8	1	0	0	-	-	8	1
2013–14	FC Utrecht	Eredivisie	10	0	1	0	-	-	11	0
2013–14	SC Cambuur	Eredivisie	6	1	0	0	-	-	6	1
Career total			78	12	4	0	-	-	82	12
