= Shkodran Metaj =

Kosovar footballer

Personal information
- Date of birth: 5 February 1988 (age 38)
- Place of birth: Studenica, Pejë, SFR Yugoslavia
- Height: 1.80 m (5 ft 11 in)
- Position: Left midfielder

Team information
- Current team: HHC Hardenberg
- Number: 26

Youth career
- VV Froombosch
- 2000–2007: Groningen

Senior career*
Years	Team	Apps	(Gls)
2007–2012	Groningen	36	(0)
2009–2010	→ RKC (loan)	29	(0)
2011–2012	→ Emmen (loan)	29	(2)
2012–2014	Emmen	50	(6)
2014–2016	Flamurtari	12	(0)
2016–	HHC Hardenberg	67	(8)

International career
- Netherlands U16
- Netherlands U17
2008–2009	Netherlands U21	5	(1)
2014–	Kosovo	0	(0)
- * Club domestic league appearances and goals as of 9 February 2019

Shkodran Metaj (born 5 February 1988) is a Kosovar footballer who plays for HHC Hardenberg in the Dutch Tweede Divisie.

== Club career ==
Metaj was born in Studenica, Pejë, SFR Yugoslavia. He started to play football with amateur club VV Froombosch, before being scouted by Dutch top flight club FC Groningen, who then signed him and entered him into their youth system.

Just before the 2007–08 Eredivisie season started, he was asked to join FC Groningen's senior squad. On September 2, 2007, Metaj made his professional debut in an away game against AFC Ajax, and later signed a contract due to expire in 2012.

Metaj spent the 2009–10 season on loan to newly promoted Eredivisie side RKC Waalwijk, with the aim for the youngster to make more first team experience. In the next season he again played few matches for Groningen, so he left on loan to FC Emmen. In the summer of 2012 he finally left Groningen and signed permanently with Emmen.

=== Flamurtari ===
Metaj signed a two-year contract with Albanian Superliga side Flamurtari Vlorë as a free agent on 29 July 2014.

== International career ==
Metaj also represented occasionally the Netherlands as several youth levels, including Netherlands U16, Netherlands U17 and Netherlands U21.
