= Matthieu Bemba =

Guadeloupean footballer (born 1988)9

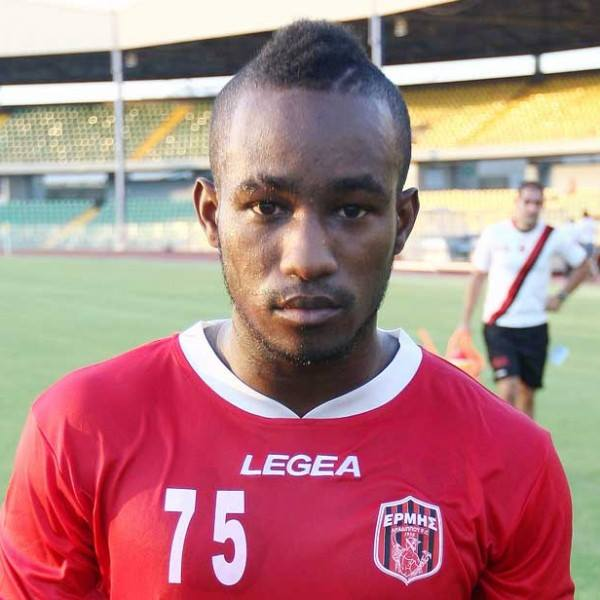
- Bemba in 2014

Personal information
- Full name: Matthieu Yannick Bemba
- Date of birth: 3 March 1988 (age 38)
- Place of birth: Paris, France
- Height: 1.80 m (5 ft 11 in)
- Position: Midfielder

Youth career
- 2003–2005: Le Blanc-Mesnil
- 2005–2006: Brétigny-sur-Orge

Senior career*
Years	Team	Apps	(Gls)
2006–2007	US Créteil-Lusitanos B	0	(0)
2007–2008	Dragon Le Gosier	0	(0)
2008–2011	Ermis Aradippou	70	(2)
2011–2012	FC Emmen	24	(0)
2012	Ethnikos Achna	8	(0)
2012–2013	UJA Maccabi	11	(1)
2013–2015	Ermis Aradippou	45	(1)
2015–2016	Nea Salamina	24	(0)
2016–2018	Radomiak Radom	59	(0)
2018–2019	ASIL Lysi	15	(0)
Total		256	(4)

International career
2010–2014	Guadeloupe	3	(0)
- * Club domestic league appearances and goals

Matthieu Yannick Bemba (born 3 March 1988) is a former professional footballer who played as a midfielder. Born in metropolitan France, he represented Guadeloupe at international level.

== Career ==
In August 2011 Bemba signed a contract with FC Emmen which plays in the second division of the Netherlands.

In September 2018, Bemba joined Cypriot club ASIL Lysi. He left the club again at the end of the season.
