= Lars Gulpen =

Dutch footballer (born 1993)

Personal information
- Full name: Lars Gulpen
- Date of birth: 4 July 1993 (age 33)
- Place of birth: Nijswiller, Netherlands
- Height: 1.80 m (5 ft 11 in)
- Position: Midfielder

Team information
- Current team: Zwart-Wit '19

Youth career
- SV Nyswiller
- Fortuna Sittard

Senior career*
Years	Team	Apps	(Gls)
2010–2015	Fortuna Sittard	47	(4)
2015–2022	EHC		
2022–	Zwart-Wit '19		
- * Club domestic league appearances and goals as of 13 May 2015 (UTC)

Lars Gulpen (born 4 July 1993 in Nijswiller) is a Dutch former professional footballer who played as a midfielder for Fortuna Sittard in the Dutch Eerste Divisie.

Once regarded as a big talent, he could not live up to the expectations and left Fortuna for EHC in summer 2015. Gulpen later played for amateur side Zwart-Wit '19 from Eys since 2022, but took a year off before returning to the club.
