= Rafael Uiterloo =

Dutch footballer (born 1990)

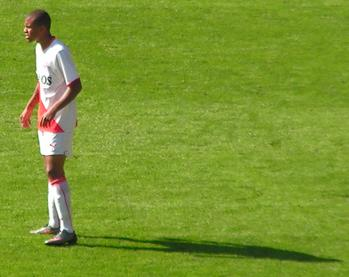

Personal information
- Full name: Rafael Steve Uiterloo
- Date of birth: 7 December 1990 (age 35)
- Place of birth: Amsterdam, Netherlands
- Height: 1.88 m (6 ft 2 in)
- Position: Forward

Team information
- Current team: DVS '33
- Number: 38

Youth career
- SC Voorland
- –2006: Zeeburgia
- 2006–2008: Ajax
- 2008–2010: Utrecht

Senior career*
Years	Team	Apps	(Gls)
2008–2010	Utrecht	9	(1)
2009	→ Omniworld (loan)	0	(0)
2010–2011	Baniyas	22	(11)
2013–2015	FC Lienden	51	(26)
2015–2016	Telstar	18	(1)
2016–2017	FC Eindhoven	22	(3)
2017	De Treffers	7	(0)
2018	Atlantic City		
2019	FC Lienden	12	(1)
2019–	DVS '33	15	(3)
- * Club domestic league appearances and goals as of 22:27, 24 February 2020 (UTC)

Rafael Uiterloo (born 7 December 1990) is a Dutch footballer who plays for DVS '33 in the Dutch Derde Divisie. His favourite position on the field is forward.

== Career ==
Born in Amsterdam, Uiterloo joined FC Utrecht from the Ajax academy in the summer of 2008. He made his professional debut in the 2008–09 season opener against PSV (1–5 defeat); he scored the only Utrecht goal. Uiterloo left Utrecht in July 2009 and joined on loan to FC Omniworld. He spent the 2009–10 Eerste Divisie campaign with Omniworld but returned to Utrecht before 1 August because of a meniscus surgery. He joined Baniyas SC in 2010.

On 25 September 2019 Uiterloo joined Derde Divisie club DVS '33.
