= Elson Almeida =

Portuguese footballer (born 1990)

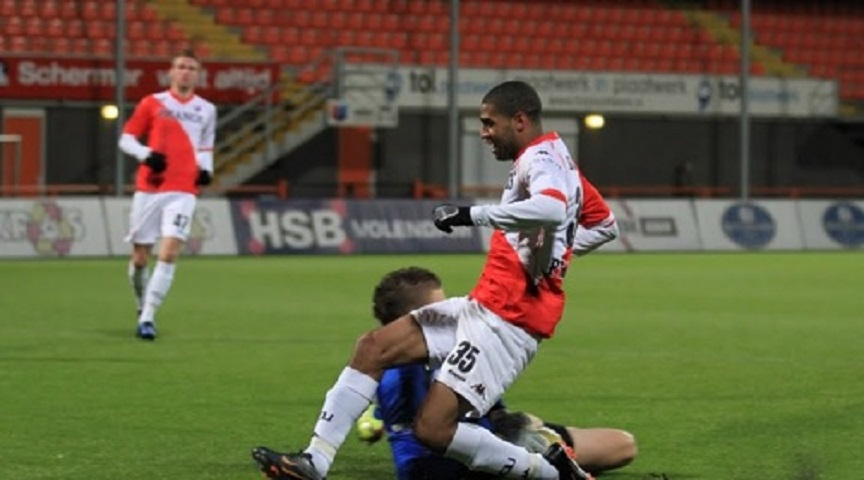

Personal information
- Full name: Elson do Rosario Almeida
- Date of birth: 23 June 1990 (age 36)
- Place of birth: Lisbon, Portugal
- Height: 1.82 m (6 ft 0 in)
- Position: Right back

Youth career
- FC Utrecht

Senior career*
Years	Team	Apps	(Gls)
2011–2015	FC Emmen	67	(4)
2015–2018	Excelsior Maassluis	51	(3)
2018–2019	BVV Barendrecht	28	(0)
- * Club domestic league appearances and goals as of 5 September 2019

Elson do Rosario Almeida (born 23 June 1990) is a Portuguese professional footballer who plays as a right back, most recently for BVV Barendrecht in the Dutch Tweede Divisie.

== Personal life ==
Almeida was born in Portugal and is of Cape Verdean descent.
