= Tom Daemen =

Dutch professional footballer

Personal information
- Full name: Tom Daemen
- Date of birth: 17 June 1985 (age 41)
- Place of birth: Brunssum, Netherlands
- Height: 1.81 m (5 ft 11 in)
- Position: Midfielder

Youth career
- BVC '28
- Fortuna Sittard

Senior career*
Years	Team	Apps	(Gls)
2002–2006	Fortuna Sittard	107	(8)
2006–2012	MVV	168	(22)
2012–2013	AEK Larnaca	6	(1)
2013	→ EN Paralimni (loan)	13	(1)
2013–2014	Aris Limassol	19	(1)
2014–2015	NEC	36	(5)
2015–2017	Go Ahead Eagles	23	(0)
Total		372	(38)
- * Club domestic league appearances and goals

Tom Daemen (born 17 June 1985) is a Dutch former professional footballer who played as a midfielder. He formerly played for Fortuna Sittard, MVV, NEC and Go Ahead Eagles in his native Netherlands and Cypriot teams AEK Larnaca, Enosis Neon Paralimni, Aris Limassol.

== Club career ==
Daemen was born in Brunssum, and rose through the ranks of local amateur side, BVC' 28 Bingelrade and later professional club Fortuna Sittard. Daemen made his professional debut on 25 October 2002 against Helmond Sport, where he came in as a substitute in a 4-1 away defeat.

In 2006, Daemen moved to another Limburgian club, MVV Maastricht. Here he became captain of the team, and often had the honour of receiving the prize of best player.

In 2012, Daemen moved abroad to play for Cypriot outfit AEK Larnaca alongside compatriots Tim de Cler, Gregoor van Dijk and Edwin Linssen and with Leon Vlemmings at the helm. Finding it hard to earn a place in the starting line-up, he was snapped up by another Dutchman, Ton Caanen, at EN Paralimni. Then, Caanen took Daemen with him to Aris Limassol the following season.

He returned to the Netherlands in 2014 and joined high-flying Eerste Divisie club NEC, only to leave them after a season for Go Ahead Eagles.

After he renounced a transfer to FC Den Bosch in August 2017, Daemen no longer found a club. In February 2018, he started working as a commercial employee at MVV Maastricht. He left that position in June 2021.

== Honours ==
=== Club ===
NEC

- Eerste Divisie: 2014–15
