= Dean Koolhof =

Dutch footballer

Personal information
- Date of birth: 15 December 1994 (age 31)
- Place of birth: Duiven, Netherlands
- Height: 1.74 m (5 ft 8 1/2 in)
- Position: Attacking midfielder

Youth career
- DVV
- De Graafschap

Senior career*
Years	Team	Apps	(Gls)
2013–2017	De Graafschap	69	(12)
2017–2018	MVV Maastricht	25	(3)
2018–2020	Helmond Sport	40	(2)
- * Club domestic league appearances and goals

Dean Koolhof (born 15 December 1994) is a retired Dutch professional footballer who played as an attacking midfielder. He formerly played for De Graafschap, MVV Maastricht and Helmond Sport.

== Personal ==
Dean is the son of former football player and manager Jurrie Koolhof and the brother of tennis player Wesley Koolhof.
