= Sander Fischer =

Dutch professional footballer

Personal information
- Date of birth: 23 September 1988 (age 38)
- Place of birth: Rhoon, Netherlands
- Height: 1.91 m (6 ft 3 in)
- Position: Centre back

Youth career
- SV WCR
- NAC Breda

Senior career*
Years	Team	Apps	(Gls)
2008	NAC Breda	1	(0)
2008–2010	Cambuur	14	(0)
2010	→ Emmen (loan)	16	(0)
2010–2012	Emmen	53	(3)
2012–2013	AGOVV	16	(2)
2013–2016	Excelsior	113	(4)
2016–2017	Go Ahead Eagles	33	(1)
2017–2018	Sparta Rotterdam	29	(1)
2017	Sparta Rotterdam II	2	(0)
2018–2019	Vendsyssel	30	(1)
2019–2021	Excelsior	54	(2)
2021–2023	Capelle		
Total		361	(14)
- * Club domestic league appearances and goals

Sander Fischer (born 23 September 1988) is a Dutch former professional footballer who plays as a centre back.

== Club career ==
He formerly played for NAC Breda, SC Cambuur, FC Emmen, AGOVV, Excelsior, Go Ahead Eagles, and Sparta.

On 29 March 2021, he agreed to join VV Capelle in the fifth-tier Hoofdklasse for the 2021–22 season.
