= Erik Quekel =

Dutch footballer

Personal information
- Full name: Erik Quekel
- Date of birth: 16 April 1987 (age 39)
- Place of birth: 's-Hertogenbosch, Netherlands
- Height: 1.81 m (5 ft 11 in)
- Position: Striker

Youth career
- Litta Combinatie '03
- TOP Oss

Senior career*
Years	Team	Apps	(Gls)
2006–2010	TOP Oss	85	(36)
2010–2011	Dordrecht	29	(17)
2011–2013	Helmond Sport	51	(23)
2013–2015	Den Bosch	47	(24)
2015	→ PSV (loan)	10	(2)
2015	→ Jong PSV	15	(3)
2015–2017	De Graafschap	8	(3)
2017–2018	FC Oss	12	(9)
- * Club domestic league appearances and goals as of 17 December 2017

Erik Quekel (born 16 April 1987) is a Dutch professional footballer. He formerly played for TOP Oss, FC Dordrecht, Helmond Sport, FC Den Bosch, Jong PSV and De Graafschap.

== Career ==
Quekel made his professional debut for TOP Oss in the 2006–07 season. He made 85 appearances for the club in which he scored 36 goals. After four years, he moved to FC Dordrecht, where he spent a year before joining Helmond Sport for the 2011–12 season. At the beginning of the 2013–14 season, Quekel trained with FC Oss, who, however, did not have the financial means to sign him to a contract. In view of an injury to Tom van Weert, rival FC Den Bosch were in need of strikers and had the opportunity to offer Quekel a contract. As a result of his move to the rivals, hard core supporters of FC Oss sent threats to the Quekel family, who were living in Oss. Quekel eventually made his debut for FC Den Bosch on 15 September 2013 against his former club FC Oss. Den Bosch won 0–1.

FC Den Bosch sent Quekel on loan to PSV in February 2015, who recruited him as reinforcement for their reserve team, Jong PSV. Six months later, he joined De Graafschap as a free agent on a two-year deal; a team which had just won promotion to the Eredivisie. In August 2017, Quekel returned to FC Oss, the club where he once started his professional career. He left the club a year later, as his contract was not extended.
