= 2016–17 Excelsior Rotterdam season =

Dutch football club season

Excelsior Rotterdam
2016–17 season
- Stadium: Van Donge & De Roo Stadion
- Eredivisie: 12th
- KNVB Cup: 2nd round
- Top goalscorer: League: Nigel Hasselbaink (10 goals); All: Nigel Hasselbaink (11 goals)
- Highest home attendance: 4,500 (33rd week)
- Lowest home attendance: 3,200 (2nd week)
- Average home league attendance: 4,069
- Biggest win: 4-1 (SC Heerenveen(h) 27th week)
- Biggest defeat: 4-0 (Roda JC Kerkrade (a) 20th week) (Heracles Almelo (a) 23rd week) (Feyenoord (a) KNVB 2nd round)
- All statistics correct as of 29 June 2025.

The 2016–17 season was Excelsior Rotterdam's 20th season in the Eredivisie (3rd consecutive).

The club competed also in the KNVB Cup. Excelsior Rotterdam lost 4–0 against Feyenoord in the 2nd round of KNVB Cup and eliminated from the cup.

Nigel Hasselbaink was the top scorer of the club in this season with a 11 goals; 10 goals in the Eredivisie and 1 goal in the KNVB Cup.

Khalid Karami was the most appeared player in this season with 35 appearances; 33 appearances in the Eredivisie and 2 appearances in the KNVB Cup.

== Players ==
=== First-team squad ===
Source: Note: Flags indicate national team as defined under FIFA eligibility rules; some limited exceptions apply. Players may hold more than one non-FIFA nationality.

No.	Pos.	Nation	Player
1	GK	POL	Filip Kurto
2	DF	NED	Khalid Karami
4	DF	NED	Henrico Drost
5	DF	NED	Bas Kuipers
6	FW	NED	Anouar Hadouir
7	MF	SUR	Nigel Hasselbaink
8	MF	SUR	Ryan Koolwijk
9	FW	GUY	Terell Ondaan
10	MF	NED	Luigi Bruins
11	FW	NED	Stanley Elbers
12	DF	CPV	Jeffry Fortes
13	GK	NED	Alessandro Damen
14	FW	NED	Cedric Badjeck
15	DF	NED	Jurgen Mattheij
16	GK	NED	Mike Havekotte

No.	Pos.	Nation	Player
17	MF	ANG	Fredy
18	MF	NED	Kevin Vermeulen
19	MF	NED	Carlo de Reuver
20	DF	CPV	Elso Brito
21	MF	SRB	Danilo Pantic
23	DF	NED	Milan Massop
24	MF	NED	Hicham Faik
29	FW	NED	Mike van Duinen
30	DF	NED	Jordy de Wijs
34	MF	TUR	Dogucan Haspolat
44	DF	BRA	Arghus
—	DF	NED	Leeroy Owusu
—	GK	SUR	Warner Hahn
—	DF	BRA	Arghus

== Transfers ==
=== In ===
Pos.	Player	Transferred from	Fee	Date
MF	(Angola) Fredy	(Angola) C.R.D. Libolo	Free	1 July 2016
DF	(Cape Verde) Jeffry Fortes	(Netherlands) FC Utrecht	Free	1 July 2016
MF	(Suriname) Ryan Koolwijk	(Slovakia) AS Trenčín	Free	1 July 2016
FW	(Guyana) Terell Ondaan	(Netherlands) Willem II Tilburg	Free	1 July 2016
FW	(Netherlands) Anouar Hadouir	(Morocco) MA Tétouan	Free	11 July 2016
DF	(Netherlands) Milan Massop	(Netherlands) FC Eindhoven	Free	2 August 2016
DF	(Brazil) Arghus Soares	(Portugal) S.C. Braga	On loan	4 August 2016
MF	(Serbia) Danilo Pantic	(England) Chelsea F.C.	On loan	12 August 2016
MF	(Netherlands) Hicham Faik	(Netherlands) Roda JC Kerkrade	On loan	30 August 2016
FW	(Netherlands) Mike van Duinen	(Germany) Fortuna Düsseldorf	Free	31 August 2016
GK	(Suriname) Warner Hahn	(Netherlands) Feyenoord	On loan	1 January 2017
MF	(Morocco) Ali Messaoud	(Liechtenstein) FC Vaduz	Free	7 January 2017
DF	(United States) Desevio Payne	(Netherlands) FC Groningen	Free	7 January 2017
DF	(Netherlands) Lorenzo Burnet	(Slovakia) ŠK Slovan Bratislava	Free	7 January 2017
DF	(Netherlands) Jordy de Wijs	(Netherlands) PSV Eindhoven	On loan	15 January 2017

=== Out ===
Pos.	Player	Transferred to	Fee	Date
MF	(Netherlands) Yoëll van Nieff	(Netherlands) FC Groningen	End of loan	30 June 2016
DF	(Netherlands) Adil Auassar	(Netherlands) Roda JC Kerkrade	Free	1 July 2016
FW	(Curaçao) Brandley Kuwas	(Netherlands) Heracles Almelo		1 July 2016
DF	(Netherlands) Daan Bovenberg	No club	End of career	1 July 2016
FW	(Netherlands) Daryl van Mieghem	(Netherlands) Heracles Almelo	Free	1 July 2016
MF	(Netherlands) Jeff Stans	(Netherlands) NAC Breda	Free	1 July 2016
DF	(Netherlands) Kevin van Diermen	(Netherlands) NAC Breda	Free	1 July 2016
FW	(Bosnia and Herzegovina) Marko Maletic	(Belgium) Lommel S.K.	Free	1 July 2016
MF	(Netherlands) Rick Kruys	(Netherlands) VV De Meern	Free	1 July 2016
DF	(Netherlands) Sander Fischer	(Netherlands) Go Ahead Eagles	Free	1 July 2016
MF	(Netherlands) Tom Overtoom	(Netherlands) Almere City FC	Free	1 July 2016
FW	(Netherlands) Tom van Weert	(Netherlands) FC Groningen	Free	1 July 2016
FW	(Netherlands) Michiel Hemmen	(Netherlands) SC Cambuur	Free	22 July 2016
FW	(Suriname) Nigel Hasselbaink	(Israel) Hapoel Ironi Kiryat Shmona F.C.	Free	1 January 2017
FW	(Netherlands) Cedric Badjeck	(Netherlands) De Treffers	Free	7 January 2017
GK	(Belgium) Tom Muyters	(Turkey) Samsunspor	Free	31 January 2017

== Competitions ==
=== Overall record ===
Competition	First match	Last match	Starting round	Final position	Record							
Competition	First match	Last match	Starting round	Final position	Pld	W	D	L	GF	GA	GD	Win %
Eredivisie	6 August 2016	14 May 2017	Week 1	12th	34	9	10	15	43	60	−17	26.47
KNVB Cup	20 September 2016	26 October 2017	1st Round	2nd Round	2	1	0	1	1	4	−3	50.00
Total					36	10	10	16	44	64	−20	27.78

Source: ESPN

=== Eredivisie ===
==== League table ====
Pos	Team	Pld	W	D	L	GF	GA	GD	Pts
10	Heracles Almelo	34	12	7	15	53	55	−2	43
11	ADO Den Haag	34	11	5	18	37	59	−22	38
12	Excelsior	34	9	10	15	43	60	−17	37
13	Willem II	34	9	9	16	29	44	−15	36
14	PEC Zwolle	34	9	8	17	39	67	−28	35

Source: NUsport (in Dutch), Soccerway
Rules for classification: 1) Points; 2) Goal difference; 3) Goals scored; 4) Play-off (only for deciding champion and relegation); 5) Head-to-head points; 6) Head-to-head goal difference; 7) Head-to-head away goals scored; 8) Draw. (Note: Criteria 5-8 is only used if deciding Europa League play-off places)

==== Results summary ====
Overall								Home						Away					
Pld	W	D	L	GF	GA	GD	Pts	W	D	L	GF	GA	GD	W	D	L	GF	GA	GD
34	9	10	15	43	60	−17	37	6	5	6	27	25	+2	3	5	9	16	35	−19

Source: https://www.espn.nl/voetbal/stand/_/competitie/NED.1/season/2016

==== Results by round ====
Round	1	2	3	4	5	6	7	8	9	10	11	12	13	14	15	16	17	18	19	20	21	22	23	24	25	26	27	28	29	30	31	32	33	34
Ground	A	H	H	A	H	A	H	A	H	H	A	A	H	A	H	A	H	A	H	A	A	H	A	H	A	H	H	A	H	A	H	A	H	A
Result	W	W	L	L	W	D	L	L	L	L	L	L	W	D	D	L	D	L	D	L	D	D	L	L	D	W	D	D	L	W	W	W	W	L
Position																																		12

Source: Eredivisie
A = Away; H = Home; W = Win; D = Draw; L = Loss

=== Matches ===
==== 1st half ====
6 August 2016 1st week	FC Twente	1-2	Excelsior Rotterdam	Enschede
19:45	Jari Oosterwijk 82'	Report	Kevin Vermeulen 13'; Leeroy Owusu 61'	Stadium: De Grolsch Veste; Attendance: 25,100

13 August 2016 2nd week	Excelsior Rotterdam	2-0	FC Groningen	Rotterdam
18:30	Jurgen Mattheij 2'; Kevin Vermeulen 90+3'	Report		Stadium: Stadion Woudestein; Attendance: 3,200

19 August 2016 3rd week	Excelsior Rotterdam	1-2	ADO Den Haag	Rotterdam
20:00	Jurgen Mattheij 8'	Report	Gervane Kastaneer 25'; Tom Beugelsdijk 68'	Stadium: Stadion Woudestein; Attendance: 4,123

27 August 2016 4th week	Feyenoord	4-1	Excelsior Rotterdam	Rotterdam
19:45	Dirk Kuyt 44' 59'; Steven Berghuis 61'; Jens Toornstra 65'	Report	Stanley Elbers 26'	Stadium: De Kuip; Attendance: 47,500

10 September 2016 5th week	Excelsior Rotterdam	3-1	Heracles Almelo	Rotterdam
20:45	Khalid Karami 1'; Ryan Koolwijk 19'; Fredy 22'	Report	Vincent Vermeij 66'	Stadium: Stadion Woudestein; Attendance: 4,462

17 September 2016 6th week	Willem II Tilburg	1-1	Excelsior Rotterdam	Tilburg
20:45	Fran Sol 6'	Report	Hicham Faik 80'	Stadium: Koning Willem II Stadion; Attendance: 11,500

24 September 2016 7th week	Excelsior Rotterdam	1-3	PSV Eindhoven	Rotterdam
20:45	Luigi Bruins 26' (pen.)	Report	Luciano Narsingh 21'; Luuk de Jong 45+2'; Davy Propper 83'	Stadium: Stadion Woudestein; Attendance: 4,400

1 October 2016 8th week	Go Ahead Eagles	3-0	Excelsior Rotterdam	Deventer
20:45	Sander Duits 11'; Sam Hendriks 36' (pen.) 72' (pen.)	Report		Stadium: De Adelaarshorst; Attendance: 9,122

16 October 2016 9th week	Excelsior Rotterdam	0-1	Roda JC Kerkrade	Rotterdam
14:30		Report	David Boysen 56'	Stadium: Stadion Woudestein; Attendance: 3,544

21 October 2016 10th week	Excelsior Rotterdam	0-2	PEC Zwolle	Rotterdam
20:00		Report	Queensy Menig 48'; Django Warmerdam 88'	Stadium: Stadion Woudestein; Attendance: 3,640

29 October 2016 11th week	AFC Ajax	1-0	Excelsior Rotterdam	Amsterdam
20:45	Hakim Ziyech 48'	Report		Stadium: Johan Cruijff Arena; Attendance: 47,460

6 November 2016 12th week	FC Utrecht	2-1	Excelsior Rotterdam	Utrecht
12:30	Yassine Ayoub 47'; Nacer Barazite 54'	Report	Stanley Elbers 83'	Stadium: Stadion Galgenwaard; Attendance: 18,648

19 November 2016 13th week	Excelsior Rotterdam	3-2	Sparta Rotterdam	Rotterdam
20:45	Stanley Elbers 26'; Fredy 30'; Nigel Hasselbaink 65' (pen.)	Report	Loris Brogno 22'; Denzel Dumfries 73'	Stadium: Stadion Woudestein; Attendance: 4,400

26 November 2016 14th week	SBV Vitesse	2-2	Excelsior Rotterdam	Arnhem
18:30	Ricky van Wolfswinkel 25' (pen.); Adnane Tighadouini 73'	Report	Hicham Faik 7' 14'	Stadium: Gelredome; Attendance: 14,328

3 December 2016 15th week	Excelsior Rotterdam	3-3	AZ Alkmaar	Rotterdam
19:45	Stanley Elbers 9'; Nigel Hasselbaink 26' (pen.); Hicham Faik 65'	Report	Robert Mühren 11'; Muamer Tankovic 34'; Stijn Wuytens 76'	Stadium: Stadion Woudestein; Attendance: 3,670

10 December 2016 16th week	SC Heerenveen	2-1	Excelsior Rotterdam	Heerenveen
19:45	Sam Larsson 48' 79'	Report	Nigel Hasselbaink 43' (pen.)	Stadium: Abe Lenstra Stadion; Attendance: 21,600

18 December 2016 17th week	Excelsior Rotterdam	2-2	NEC Nijmegen	Rotterdam
12:30	Stanley Elbers 11'; Khalid Karami 49'	Report	Jay-Roy Grot 41'; Dario Dumic 77'	Stadium: Stadion Woudestein; Attendance: 3,875

==== 2nd half ====
14 January 2017 18th week	PSV Eindhoven	2-0	Excelsior Rotterdam	Eindhoven
19:45	Marco van Ginkel 34'; Davy Propper 59'	Report		Stadium: Philips Stadion; Attendance: 33,000

22 January 2017 19th week	Excelsior Rotterdam	1-1	Go Ahead Eagles	Rotterdam
14:30	Nigel Hasselbaink 27'	Report	Pedro Chirivella 9'	Stadium: Stadion Woudestein; Attendance: 3,975

28 January 2017 20th week	Roda JC Kerkrade	4-0	Excelsior Rotterdam	Kerkrade
19:45	Dani Schahin 19'; Mitchell Paulissen 45+1' 65'; Athanasios Papazoglou 62'	Report		Stadium: Parkstad Limburg Stadion; Attendance: 11,858

4 February 2017 21st week	FC Groningen	1-1	Excelsior Rotterdam	Groningen
20:45	Mimoun Mahi 48' (pen.)	Report	Anouar Hadouir 80'	Stadium: Euroborg; Attendance: 17,844

12 February 2017 22nd week	Excelsior Rotterdam	1-1	FC Twente	Rotterdam
12:30	Nigel Hasselbaink 15'	Report	Fredrik Jensen 35'	Stadium: Stadion Woudestein; Attendance: 4,275

18 February 2017 23rd week	Heracles Almelo	4-0	Excelsior Rotterdam	Almelo
19:45	Brandley Kuwas 42'; Thomas Bruns 58'; Mike te Wierik 66'; Kristoffer Peterson 84'	Report		Stadium: Asito Stadion; Attendance: 10,322

25 February 2017 24th week	Excelsior Rotterdam	0-2	Willem II Tilburg	Rotterdam
19:45		Report	Dico Koppers 62'; Erik Falkenburg 63'	Stadium: Stadion Woudestein; Attendance: 4,075

5 March 2017 25th week	AZ Alkmaar	1-1	Excelsior Rotterdam	Alkmaar
12:30	Warner Hahn 20' (o.g.)	Report	Mike van Duinen 60'	Stadium: AFAS Stadion; Attendance: 13,863

11 March 2017 26th week	Excelsior Rotterdam	4-1	SC Heerenveen	Rotterdam
20:45	Stanley Elbers 15'; Jurgen Mattheij 42'; Milan Massop 48'; Nigel Hasselbaink 90+2'	Report	Luciano Slagveer 77'	Stadium: Stadion Woudestein; Attendance: 4,225

19 March 2017 27th week	Excelsior Rotterdam	1-1	AFC Ajax	Rotterdam
14:30	Kenny Tete 26' (o.g.)	Report	Justin Kluivert 32'	Stadium: Stadion Woudestein; Attendance: 4,400

1 April 2017 28th week	PEC Zwolle	1-1	Excelsior Rotterdam	Zwolle
18:30	Django Warmerdam 26'	Report	Luigi Bruins 34'	Stadium: MAC³PARK Stadion; Attendance: 13,140

4 April 2017 29th week	Excelsior Rotterdam	1-3	FC Utrecht	Rotterdam
18:30	Mike van Duinen 5'	Report	Sébastien Haller 39' (pen.); Jurgen Mattheij 49' (o.g.); Gyrano Kerk 55'	Stadium: Stadion Woudestein; Attendance: 4,247

7 April 2017 30th week	Sparta Rotterdam	2-3	Excelsior Rotterdam	Rotterdam
20:00	Ryan Koolwijk 10' (o.g.); Martin Pusic 87'	Report	Nigel Hasselbaink 23' 48'; Stanley Elbers 44'	Stadium: Sparta-Stadion Het Kasteel; Attendance: 10,606

15 April 2017 31st week	Excelsior Rotterdam	1-0	SBV Vitesse	Rotterdam
19:45	Nigel Hasselbaink 13'	Report		Stadium: Stadion Woudestein; Attendance: 4,165

22 April 2017 32nd week	NEC Nijmegen	0-1	Excelsior Rotterdam	Nijmegen
18:30		Report	Mike van Duinen 58'	Stadium: Goffertstadion; Attendance: 12,300

7 May 2017 33rd week	Excelsior Rotterdam	3-0	Feyenoord	Rotterdam
14:30	Nigel Hasselbaink 56'; Stanley Elbers 59'; Ryan Koolwijk 65'	Report		Stadium: Stadion Woudestein; Attendance: 4,500

14 May 2017 34th week	ADO Den Haag	4-1	Excelsior Rotterdam	The Hague
14:30	Sheraldo Becker 8'; Mike Havenaar 25'; Abdenasser El Khayati 33'; Wilfried Kanon 65'	Report	Jeffry Fortes 20'	Stadium: Bingoal Stadion; Attendance: 13,257

=== KNVB Cup ===
20 September 2016 1st round	BVV Barendrecht	0-1	Excelsior Rotterdam	Barendrecht
20:00		Report	Nigel Hasselbaink 26'	Stadium: Sportpark De Bongerd; Attendance: 1,225

26 October 2016 2nd round	Feyenoord	4-0	Excelsior Rotterdam	Rotterdam
20:45	Eljero Elia 48'; Eric Botteghin 50'; Jens Toornstra 75'; Marko Vejinovic 84'	Report		Stadium: De Kuip; Attendance: 37,000

== Statistics ==
=== Scorers ===
#	Player	Eredivisie	KNVB	Total
1	(Suriname) Nigel Hasselbaink	10	1	11
2	(Netherlands) Stanley Elbers	8	0	8
3	(Netherlands) Hicham Faik	4	0	4
4	(Netherlands) Jurgen Mattheij	3	0	3
4	(Netherlands) Mike van Duinen	3	0	3
6	(Angola) Fredy	2	0	2
6	(Netherlands) Kevin Vermeulen	2	0	2
6	(Netherlands) Khalid Karami	2	0	2
6	(Netherlands) Luigi Bruins	2	0	2
6	(Suriname) Ryan Koolwijk	2	0	2
11	(Netherlands) Anouar Hadouir	1	0	1
11	(Cape Verde) Jeffry Fortes	1	0	1
11	(Netherlands) Leeroy Owusu	1	0	1
11	(Netherlands) Milan Massop	1	0	1

=== Appearances ===
#	Player	Eredivisie	KNVB	Total
1	(Netherlands) Khalid Karami	33	2	35
2	(Suriname) Nigel Hasselbaink	32	2	34
2	(Suriname) Ryan Koolwijk	32	2	34
4	(Angola) Fredy	32	1	33
4	(Netherlands) Jurgen Mattheij	31	2	33
6	(Netherlands) Stanley Elbers	30	1	31
7	(Netherlands) Kevin Vermeulen	25	2	27
8	(Guyana) Terell Ondaan	25	1	26
9	(Netherlands) Luigi Bruins	24	1	25
10	(Netherlands) Hicham Faik	22	2	24
11	(Netherlands) Mike van Duinen	22	1	23
12	(Netherlands) Anouar Hadouir	21	1	22
12	(Netherlands) Bas Kuipers	20	0	22
14	(Netherlands) Henrico Drost	21	0	21
14	(Cape Verde) Jeffry Fortes	20	1	21
16	(Netherlands) Milan Massop	15	2	17
16	(Belgium) Tom Muyters	17	0	17
16	(Suriname) Warner Hahn	17	0	17
19	(Netherlands) Jordy de Wijs	15	0	15
20	(Serbia) Danilo Pantic	9	2	11
21	(Netherlands) Leeroy Owusu	5	2	7
22	(Netherlands) Cedric Badjeck	2	1	3
23	(Poland) Filip Kurto	0	2	2
24	(Brazil) Arghus	1	0	1
24	(Turkey) Dogucan Haspolat	1	0	1
24	(Cape Verde) Elso Brito	1	0	1

=== Clean sheets ===
#	Player	Eredivisie	KNVB	Total
1	(Suriname) Warner Hahn	2	0	2
2	(Poland) Filip Kurto	0	1	1
2	(Belgium) Tom Muyters	1	0	1
Total		3	1	4

=== Disciplinary record ===
#	Player	Eredivisie		KNVB		Total	
#	Player	Booked	Sent off (straight red)	Booked	Sent off (straight red)	Booked	Sent off (straight red)
1	(Netherlands) Jurgen Mattheij	5	2	2	0	7	2
2	(Serbia) Danilo Pantic	0	2	0	0	0	2
3	(Suriname) Ryan Koolwijk	7	0	1	0	8	0
4	(Netherlands) Anouar Hadouir	6	0	0	0	6	0
4	(Netherlands) Luigi Bruins	6	0	0	0	6	0
6	(Netherlands) Jordy de Wijs	5	0	0	0	5	0
6	(Netherlands) Kevin Vermeulen	5	0	0	0	5	0
8	(Netherlands) Stanley Elbers	4	0	0	0	4	0
8	(Guyana) Terell Ondaan	4	0	0	0	4	0
10	(Netherlands) Bas Kuipers	3	0	0	0	3	0
10	(Angola) Fredy	3	0	0	0	3	0
10	(Cape Verde) Jeffry Fortes	3	0	0	0	3	0
13	(Netherlands) Henrico Drost	2	0	0	0	2	0
13	(Netherlands) Mike van Duinen	2	0	0	0	2	0
13	(Netherlands) Milan Massop	2	0	0	0	2	0
16	(Netherlands) Khalid Karami	0	0	1	0	1	0
16	(Netherlands) Leeroy Owusu	0	0	1	0	1	0
16	(Belgium) Tom Muyters	1	0	0	0	1	0
