= 2015–16 Excelsior Rotterdam season =

Dutch football club season

Excelsior Rotterdam
2015–16 season
- Stadium: Van Donge & De Roo Stadion
- Eredivisie: 15th
- KNVB Cup: 3rd round
- Top goalscorer: League: Tom van Weert (11 goals); All: Tom van Weert (15 goals)
- Highest home attendance: 3,750 (6th, 14th, 17th, 30th, 31st, 33rd weeks)
- Lowest home attendance: 3,394 (2nd week)
- Average home league attendance: 3,592
- Biggest win: 3-0 (De Graafschap(h) 4th week)
- Biggest defeat: 3-0 (PEC Zwolle (a) 5th week) (SBV Vitesse (h) 11th week) (AFC Ajax (a) 23rd week) (Feyenoord (a) 28th week); 4-1 (SC Cambuur (a) 17th week)
- All statistics correct as of 28 June 2025.

The 2015–16 season was Excelsior Rotterdam's 19th season in the Eredivisie (2nd consecutive).

The club competed also in the KNVB Cup. Excelsior Rotterdam lost 4-3 against Excelsior '31 in the 3rd round of KNVB Cup and eliminated from the cup.

Tom van Weert was the top scorer of the club in this season with a 15 goals; 11 goals in the Eredivisie and 4 goals in the KNVB Cup.

Adil Auassar and Brandley Kuwas were the most appeared players in this season with 36 appearances; 34 appearances in the Eerste Divisie and 2 appearances in the KNVB Cup.

== Players ==
=== First-team squad ===
Note: Flags indicate national team as defined under FIFA eligibility rules; some limited exceptions apply. Players may hold more than one non-FIFA nationality.

No.	Pos.	Nation	Player
1	GK	POL	Filip Kurto
2	DF	NED	Khalid Karami
3	DF	SUR	Danilho Doekhi
3	DF	NED	Kevin van Diermen
4	MF	NED	Rick Kruys
5	DF	NED	Bas Kuipers
6	DF	NED	Sander Fischer
7	FW	BEL	Jordan Botaka
8	DF	NED	Adil Auassar
9	FW	NED	Tom van Weert
10	MF	NED	Jeff Stans
11	FW	NED	Daryl van Mieghem
12	DF	NED	Jurgen Mattheij

No.	Pos.	Nation	Player
14	FW	NED	Cedric Badjeck
15	FW	SUR	Nigel Hasselbaink
17	FW	CUW	Brandley Kuwas
18	MF	NED	Kevin Vermeulen
19	MF	NED	Tom Overtoom
21	DF	NED	Henrico Drost
22	GK	BEL	Tom Muyters
23	MF	NED	Luigi Bruins
24	DF	NED	Daan Bovenberg
25	FW	NED	Michiel Hemmen
27	FW	NED	Stanley Elbers
27	MF	NED	Yoell van Nieff

== Transfers ==
=== In ===
Pos.	Player	Transferred from	Fee	Date
DF	(Netherlands) Bas Kuipers	(Netherlands) Jong Ajax	Free	1 July 2015
FW	(Curaçao) Brandley Kuwas	(Netherlands) FC Volendam	Free	1 July 2015
GK	(Poland) Filip Kurto	(Netherlands) FC Dordrecht	Free	1 July 2015
FW	(Suriname) Nigel Hasselbaink	(Scotland) Hamilton Academical FC	Free	14 July 2015
MF	(Netherlands) Tom Overtoom	(Netherlands) FC Volendam	Free	23 July 2024
GK	(Netherlands) Mike Havekotte	(Netherlands) Jong Utrecht	Free	28 July 2015
MF	(Netherlands) Yoëll van Nieff	(Netherlands) FC Groningen	On loan	26 August 2015
DF	(Netherlands) Henrico Drost	(Netherlands) NAC Breda	Free	31 August 2015
FW	(Netherlands) Stanley Elbers	(Netherlands) Helmond Sport	€200,000	31 August 2015

== Competitions ==
=== Overall record ===
Competition	First match	Last match	Starting round	Record							
Competition	First match	Last match	Starting round	Pld	W	D	L	GF	GA	GD	Win %
Eredivisie	12 August 2015	8 May 2016	Week 1	34	7	9	18	34	60	−26	20.59
KNVB Cup	23 September 2015	28 October 2015	3rd Round	2	1	0	1	5	4	+1	50.00
Total				36	8	9	19	39	64	−25	22.22

Source: ESPN

=== Eredivisie ===
==== League table ====
Pos	Team	Pld	W	D	L	GF	GA	GD	Pts	Qualification or relegation
13	Twente (Note: Twente were deducted three points for breaking the financial standards set by the Royal Dutch Football Association. In May 2016 Twente had their licence for the Eredivisie revoked by KNVB and was relegated to the Eerste Divisie, but they successfully appealed this decision and stayed in the league.)	34	12	7	15	49	64	−15	40	
14	Roda JC Kerkrade	34	8	10	16	34	55	−21	34	
15	Excelsior	34	7	9	18	34	60	−26	30	
16	Willem II (O)	34	6	11	17	35	53	−18	29	Qualification for the relegation play-offs
17	De Graafschap (R)	34	5	8	21	39	66	−27	23	Qualification for the relegation play-offs

Source: Eredivisie, NUsport, Soccerway
Rules for classification: 1) Points; 2) Goal difference; 3) Goals scored; 4) Head-to-head points; 5) Head-to-head goal difference; 6) Head-to-head away goals scored; 7) Play-off (only if deciding champion, European competitions, or relegation); 8) Draw.
(O) Play-off winners; (R) Relegated

==== Results summary ====
Overall								Home						Away					
Pld	W	D	L	GF	GA	GD	Pts	W	D	L	GF	GA	GD	W	D	L	GF	GA	GD
34	7	9	18	34	60	−26	30	4	5	8	21	31	−10	3	4	10	13	29	−16

Source: https://www.espn.nl/voetbal/stand/_/competitie/NED.1/season/2015

==== Results by round ====
Round	1	2	3	4	5	6	7	8	9	10	11	12	13	14	15	16	17	18	19	20	21	22	23	24	25	26	27	28	29	30	31	32	33	34
Ground	A	H	A	H	A	H	A	H	A	A	H	A	A	H	H	A	H	A	H	H	A	H	H	A	H	A	H	A	A	H	H	A	H	A
Result	L	D	L	W	L	L	D	W	D	W	L	W	D	L	D	L	L	L	L	L	D	D	L	L	W	L	W	L	L	L	D	L	D	W
Position																																		15

A = Away; H = Home; W = Win; D = Draw; L = Loss

=== Matches ===
==== 1st half ====
12 August 2015 1st week	NEC Nijmegen	1-0	Excelsior Rotterdam	Nijmegen
20:45	Navarone Foor 88'	Report		Stadium: Goffertstadion; Attendance: 10,240

15 August 2015 2nd week	Excelsior Rotterdam	2-2	AZ Alkmaar	Rotterdam
20:45	Jeff Stans 9'; Tom van Weert 32'	Report	Markus Henriksen 14'; Robert Mühren 64'	Stadium: Van Donge & De Roo Stadion; Attendance: 3,394

21 August 2015 3rd week	FC Groningen	2-0	Excelsior Rotterdam	Groningen
20:00	Mimoun Mahi 70' 86'	Report		Stadium: Euroborg; Attendance: 19,277

29 August 2015 4th week	Excelsior Rotterdam	3-0	De Graafschap	Rotterdam
19:45	Sander Fischer 47'; Brandley Kuwas 63'; Daryl van Mieghem 84'	Report		Stadium: Van Donge & De Roo Stadion; Attendance: 3,400

12 September 2015 5th week	PEC Zwolle	3-0	Excelsior Rotterdam	Zwolle
20:45	Lars Veldwijk 13' 25' 57'	Report		Stadium: MAC³PARK Stadion; Attendance: 11,800

20 September 2015 6th week	Excelsior Rotterdam	0-2	AFC Ajax	Rotterdam
14:30		Report	Anwar El Ghazi 33'; Arkadiusz Milik 42'	Stadium: Van Donge & De Roo Stadion; Attendance: 3,750

27 September 2015 7th week	ADO Den Haag	3-3	Excelsior Rotterdam	Den Haag
14:30	Mike Havenaar 7' 65'; Gianni Zuiverloon 49'	Report	Adil Auassar 44' 62'; Brandley Kuwas 81'	Stadium: Bingoal Stadion; Attendance: 10,667

3 October 2015 8th week	Excelsior Rotterdam	1-0	FC Utrecht	Rotterdam
20:45	Jeff Stans 74' (pen.)	Report		Stadium: Van Donge & De Roo Stadion; Attendance: 3,430

17 October 2015 9th week	PSV Eindhoven	1-1	Excelsior Rotterdam	Eindhoven
20:45	Davy Propper 62'	Report	Nigel Hasselbaink 90+2'	Stadium: Philips Stadion; Attendance: 32,800

24 October 2015 10th week	Roda JC Kerkrade	1-2	Excelsior Rotterdam	Kerkrade
20:45	Tomi Juric 13'	Report	Sander Fischer 41'; Jeff Stans 67'	Stadium: Parkstad Limburg Stadion; Attendance: 13,907

31 October 2015 11th week	Excelsior Rotterdam	0-3	SBV Vitesse	Rotterdam
19:45		Report	Dominic Solanke 16' (pen.); Kevin Diks 49'; Milot Rashica 54'	Stadium: Van Donge & De Roo Stadion; Attendance: 3,600

7 November 2015 12th week	Willem II Tilburg	2-3	Excelsior Rotterdam	Tilburg
19:45	Richairo Zivkovic 1'; Dries Wuytens 19'	Report	Tom van Weert 3'; Jeff Stans 29' (pen.); Daryl van Mieghem 57'	Stadium: Koning Willem II Stadion; Attendance: 11,200

22 November 2015 13th week	Heracles Almelo	0-0	Excelsior Rotterdam	Almelo
12:30		Report		Stadium: Asito Stadion; Attendance: 11,721

28 November 2015 14th week	Excelsior Rotterdam	2-4	Feyenoord	Rotterdam
19:45	Daryl van Mieghem 44'; Tom van Weert 86'	Report	Dirk Kuyt 2'; Michiel Kramer 36' 55' 71'	Stadium: Van Donge & De Roo Stadion; Attendance: 3,750

5 December 2015 15th week	Excelsior Rotterdam	1-1	FC Twente	Rotterdam
18:30	Tom van Weert 38'	Report	Hakim Ziyech 75'	Stadium: Van Donge & De Roo Stadion; Attendance: 3,400

11 December 2015 16th week	SC Heerenveen	2-1	Excelsior Rotterdam	Heerenveen
20:00	Kenny Otigba 22'; Sam Larsson 55'	Report	Jeff Stans 90+2' (pen.)	Stadium: Abe Lenstra Stadion; Attendance: 22,150

20 December 2015 17th week	Excelsior Rotterdam	1-4	SC Cambuur	Rotterdam
12:30	Kevin Vermeulen 90+2'	Report	Bartholomew Ogbeche 34' 71'; Jack Byrne 88'; Jamiro Monteiro 90+1'	Stadium: Van Donge & De Roo Stadion; Attendance: 3,750

==== 2nd half ====
16 January 2016 18th week	De Graafschap	2-0	Excelsior Rotterdam	Doetinchem
20:45	Cas Peters 71'; Vincent Vermeij 90+1'	Report		Stadium: De Vijverberg; Attendance: 10,253

23 January 2016 19th week	Excelsior Rotterdam	0-1	Roda JC Kerkrade	Rotterdam
19:45		Report	Hicham Faik 83'	Stadium: Van Donge & De Roo Stadion; Attendance: 3,500

27 January 2016 20th week	Excelsior Rotterdam	1-3	PSV Eindhoven	Rotterdam
20:45	Jeffrey Bruma 90' (o.g.)	Report	Luuk de Jong 8'; Jorrit Hendrix 48'; Luciano Narsingh 59'	Stadium: Van Donge & De Roo Stadion; Attendance: 3,700

30 January 2016 21st week	SBV Vitesse	0-0	Excelsior Rotterdam	Arnhem
18:30		Report		Stadium: Gelredome; Attendance: 20,112

5 February 2016 22nd week	Excelsior Rotterdam	0-0	Willem II Tilburg	Rotterdam
20:00		Report		Stadium: Van Donge & De Roo Stadion; Attendance: 3,500

14 February 2016 23rd week	Excelsior Rotterdam	2-4	ADO Den Haag	Rotterdam
14:30	Tom van Weert 24' 69'	Report	Kevin Jansen 9'; Dennis van der Heijden 78' 86'; Mike Havenaar 89'	Stadium: Van Donge & De Roo Stadion; Attendance: 3,519

21 February 2016 24th week	AFC Ajax	3-0	Excelsior Rotterdam	Amsterdam
14:30	Arkadiusz Milik 41' 55'; Davy Klaassen 85'	Report		Stadium: Johan Cruijff Arena; Attendance: 48,800

26 February 2016 25th week	Excelsior Rotterdam	2-0	NEC Nijmegen	Rotterdam
20:00	Tom van Weert 13' 81'	Report		Stadium: Van Donge & De Roo Stadion; Attendance: 3,523

6 March 2016 26th week	AZ Alkmaar	2-0	Excelsior Rotterdam	Alkmaar
14:30	Derrick Luckassen 57'; Vincent Janssen 77' (pen.)	Report		Stadium: AFAS Stadion; Attendance: 15,050

12 March 2016 27th week	Excelsior Rotterdam	2-1	FC Groningen	Rotterdam
20:45	Tom van Weert 49'; Jeff Stans 54' (pen.)	Report	Michael de Leeuw 71'	Stadium: Van Donge & De Roo Stadion; Attendance: 3,605

18 March 2016 28th week	FC Utrecht	2-1	Excelsior Rotterdam	Utrecht
20:00	Sébastien Haller 33' (pen.) 45'	Report	Rick Kruys 5'	Stadium: Stadion Galgenwaard; Attendance: 16,081

2 April 2016 29th Week	Feyenoord	3-0	Excelsior Rotterdam	Rotterdam
20:45	Dirk Kuyt 21' 59'; Eljero Elia 33'	Report		Stadium: Stadion Feijenoord; Attendance: 46,500

9 April 2016 30th week	Excelsior Rotterdam	1-3	Heracles Almelo	Rotterdam
18:30	Brandley Kuwas 46'	Report	Wout Weghorst 6' 37'; Ramon Zomer 60'	Stadium: Van Donge & De Roo Stadion; Attendance: 3,750

17 April 2016 31st week	Excelsior Rotterdam	1-1	SC Heerenveen	Rotterdam
16:45	Brandley Kuwas 37'	Report	Sam Larsson 41'	Stadium: Van Donge & De Roo Stadion; Attendance: 3,750

20 April 2016 32nd week	FC Twente	2-0	Excelsior Rotterdam	Enschede
20:45	Jerson Cabral 85'; Zakaria El Azzouzi 90'	Report		Stadium: De Grolsch Veste; Attendance: 24,500

1 May 2016 33rd week	Excelsior Rotterdam	2-2	PEC Zwolle	Rotterdam
14:30	Tom van Weert 61'; Daan Bovenberg 80'		Lars Veldwijk 16'; Queensy Menig 65'	Stadium: Van Donge & De Roo Stadion; Attendance: 3,750; Referee: Bas Nijhuis

8 May 2016 34th week	SC Cambuur	0-2	Excelsior Rotterdam	Leeuwarden
14:30		Report	Tom van Weert 4'; Kevin Vermeulen 59'	Stadium: Cambuur Stadion; Attendance: 8,650

=== KNVB Cup ===
23 September 2015 2nd round	BVV Barendrecht	0-2	Excelsior Rotterdam	Barendrecht
20:00		Report	Tom van Weert 3'; Daryl van Mieghem 90+1'	Stadium: Sportpark De Bongerd; Referee: Serdar Gözübüyük

28 October 2015 3rd round	Excelsior '31	4-3	Excelsior Rotterdam	Rijssen
20:00	Cem Köse 24'; Patrick Gerritsen 30' 61'; Hakim Ezafzafi 89'	Report	Tom van Weert 7' 10' 64'	Stadium: Sportpark de Koerbelt; Referee: Bjorn Kuipers

== Statistics ==
=== Scorers ===
#	Player	Eredivisie	KNVB	Total
1	(Netherlands) Tom van Weert	11	4	15
2	(Netherlands) Jeff Stans	6	0	6
3	(Curaçao) Brandley Kuwas	4	0	4
3	(Netherlands) Daryl van Mieghem	3	1	4
5	(Iceland) Adil Auassar	2	0	2
5	(Netherlands) Kevin Vermeulen	2	0	2
5	(Netherlands) Sander Fischer	2	0	2
8	(Netherlands) Daan Bovenberg	1	0	1
8	(Suriname) Nigel Hasselbaink	1	0	1
8	(Netherlands) Rick Kruys	1	0	1

=== Appearances ===
#	Player	Eredivisie	KNVB	Total
1	(Netherlands) Adil Auassar	34	2	36
1	(Curaçao) Brandley Kuwas	34	2	36
3	(Netherlands) Jeff Stans	32	2	34
3	(Netherlands) Sander Fischer	32	2	34
3	(Netherlands) Tom van Weert	32	2	34
6	(Netherlands) Rick Kruys	32	0	32
7	(Netherlands) Khalid Karami	30	1	31
8	(Netherlands) Daryl van Mieghem	29	1	30
9	(Belgium) Tom Muyters	25	2	27
10	(Netherlands) Bas Kuipers	24	1	25
11	(Netherlands) Kevin Vermeulen	23	1	24
12	(Netherlands) Jurgen Mattheij	21	2	23
13	(Netherlands) Luigi Bruins	18	1	19
13	(Suriname) Nigel Hasselbaink	17	2	19
13	(Netherlands) Stanley Elbers	18	1	19
16	(Netherlands) Daan Bovenberg	16	2	18
17	(Netherlands) Henrico Drost	13	0	13
18	(Poland) Filip Kurto	11	0	11
19	(Netherlands) Yoell van Nieff	5	0	5
20	(Belgium) Jordan Botaka	4	0	4
20	(Netherlands) Kevin van Diermen	4	0	4
20	(Netherlands) Michiel Hemmen	4	0	4
20	(Netherlands) Tom Overtoom	2	2	4
24	(Netherlands) Cedric Badjeck	1	0	1
24	(Suriname) Danilho Doekhi	1	0	1

=== Clean sheets ===
#	Player	Eredivisie	KNVB	Total
1	(Belgium) Tom Muyters	2	1	3

=== Disciplinary record ===
#	Player	Eredivisie		KNVB		Total	
#	Player	Booked	Sent off (straight red)	Booked	Sent off (straight red)	Booked	Sent off (straight red)
1	(Netherlands) Sander Fischer	3	2	0	0	3	2
2	(Netherlands) Jurgen Mattheij	4	1	0	0	4	1
2	(Netherlands) Tom van Weert	4	1	0	0	4	1
4	(Netherlands) Bas Kuipers	5	0	0	0	5	0
4	(Netherlands) Rick Kruys	5	0	0	0	5	0
6	(Netherlands) Khalid Karami	4	0	0	0	4	0
6	(Netherlands) Luigi Bruins	4	0	0	0	4	0
6	(Curaçao) Nigel Hasselbaink	4	0	0	0	4	0
9	(Netherlands) Adil Auassar	3	0	0	0	3	0
9	(Curaçao) Brandley Kuwas	3	0	0	0	3	0
9	(Netherlands) Daan Bovenberg	2	0	1	0	3	0
9	(Netherlands) Kevin Vermeulen	3	0	0	0	3	0
13	(Netherlands) Daryl van Mieghem	1	0	0	0	1	0
13	(Netherlands) Jeff Stans	1	0	0	0	1	0
13	(Netherlands) Kevin van Diermen	1	0	0	0	1	0
13	(Netherlands) Stanley Elbers	1	0	0	0	1	0
13	(Netherlands) Tom Overtoom	1	0	0	0	1	0
