= 2013–14 FC Utrecht season =

FC Utrecht
2013–14 season
- Manager: Jan Wouters
- Stadium: Stadion Galgenwaard
- Eredivisie: 10th
- KNVB Cup: Quarter-finals
- Europa League: Second qualifying round
- Top goalscorer: League: Jens Toornstra (12); All: Jens Toornstra (15)
- Average home league attendance: 16,938

During the 2013–14 FC Utrecht season, the club participated in the Eredivisie, KNVB Cup and UEFA Europa League.

== Competitions ==
=== Eredivsie ===
==== League table ====
Pos	Team	Pld	W	D	L	GF	GA	GD	Pts	Qualification or relegation
8	AZ	34	13	8	13	54	50	+4	47	Qualification for the European competition play-offs
9	ADO Den Haag	34	12	7	15	45	64	−19	43	
10	Utrecht	34	11	8	15	46	65	−19	41	
11	PEC Zwolle	34	9	13	12	47	49	−2	40	Qualification for the Europa League play-off round (Note: PEC Zwolle qualified for the 2014–15 UEFA Europa League play-off round by winning the 2013–14 KNVB Cup.)
12	Cambuur	34	10	9	15	40	50	−10	39	

Source: Eredivisie
Rules for classification: 1) points; 2) goal difference; 3) number of goals scored

==== Results ====
4 August 2013 1	Utrecht	1–1	Go Ahead Eagles	Utrecht
14:30	Bulthuis 15', (yellow card) 28'; Heerings (yellow card) 90+1'	Summary	Houtkoop 46'	Stadium: Stadion Galgenwaard; Attendance: 14,551; Referee: Jochem Kamphuis

11 August 2013 2	Groningen	2–0	Utrecht	Groningen
14:30	Van der Velden 2' (pen.); Zivkovic 71'; Kappelhof (yellow card) 81'	Summary	Oar (yellow card) 40'	Stadium: Euroborg; Attendance: 19,076; Referee: Dennis Higler

18 August 2013 3	Twente	6–0	Utrecht	Enschede
16:30	Promes 8', 68', (yellow card) 54'; Tadić 11' (pen.); Castaignos 25', 36'; Bengtsson 90'	Summary	Mårtensson (yellow card) 11'	Stadium: De Grolsch Veste; Attendance: 29,700; Referee: Pol van Boekel

25 August 2013 4	Utrecht	2–0	AZ	Utrecht
16:30	Van der Maarel (yellow card) 44'; De Ridder 54', 66'; Janssen (yellow card) 60'; Toornstra (yellow card) 84'	Summary	Gudelj (yellow card) 36'; Beerens (yellow card) 50'	Stadium: Stadion Galgenwaard; Attendance: 14,486; Referee: Tom van Sichem

1 September 2013 5	PEC Zwolle	1–1	Utrecht	Zwolle
14:30	Lachman (yellow card) 50'; Nijland 74'	Summary	Janssen 50'; Bulthuis (yellow card) 88'	Stadium: IJsseldelta Stadion; Attendance: 11,324; Referee: Eric Braamhaar

15 September 2013 6	Utrecht	2–1	RKC Waalwijk	Utrecht
16:30	De Ridder 5', 40'	Summary	Lamey (yellow card) 45'; Amieux 63'; Slager (yellow card) 73'	Stadium: Stadion Galgenwaard; Attendance: 14,717; Referee: Richard Liesveld

22 September 2013 7	Feyenoord	1–0	Utrecht	Rotterdam
14:30	Mathijsen (yellow card) 6'; Vilhena 35'; Goossens (yellow card) 90+2'	Summary	Ayoub (yellow card) 32'; Bulthuis (yellow card) 72'	Stadium: De Kuip; Attendance: 46,000; Referee: Björn Kuipers

28 September 2013 8	Utrecht	3–3	Roda JC	Utrecht
19:45	Van der Gun 13', (yellow card) 32'; Bulthuis (yellow card) 39'; Kurto 41' (o.g.); Takagi (yellow card) 50' (yellow-red card) 87'; Toornstra 86'	Summary	Fledderus (yellow card) 17', (goal) 62'; Németh 27', 74'; Bonevacia (yellow card) 78'; Kali (yellow card) 85'; Biemans (yellow card) 85'	Stadium: Stadion Galgenwaard; Attendance: 14,320; Referee: Danny Makkelie

6 October 2013 9	Ajax	3–0	Utrecht	Amsterdam
12:30	Serero 45'; Klaassen 59'; Hoesen 90+1'	Summary	Ayoub (yellow card) 17'; Mårtensson (yellow card) 26'	Stadium: Amsterdam Arena; Attendance: 49,294; Referee: Kevin Blom

19 October 2013 10	Utrecht	4–2	NAC Breda	Utrecht
19:45	Ayoub 16'; Toornstra 63', 83'; Mulenga 81'	Summary	Buijs (yellow card) 25'; Verbeek 36'; Hadouir 86', (yellow card) 87'	Stadium: Stadion Galgenwaard; Attendance: 16,019; Referee: Bas Nijhuis

26 October 2013 11	Cambuur	3–1	Utrecht	Leeuwarden
19:45	Leeuwin (yellow card) 59'; Hemmen 61'; Bakker 80'; El Makrini (yellow card) 86'; Ritzmaier 90+1'	Summary	Ayoub 10'; Diemers (yellow card) 50'; Heerings (yellow card) 52'	Stadium: Cambuur Stadion; Attendance: 9,620; Referee: Dennis Higler

3 November 2013 12	Utrecht	2–0	Heerenveen	Utrecht
16:30	Toornstra 19'; Van der Maarel (yellow card) 52'; Mulenga 54'; Oar (yellow card) 57'	Summary	De Roon (yellow card) 13'; Otigba (yellow card) 18'; Van den Berg (yellow card) 22'; Van La Parra (yellow card) 82'; Kruiswijk (yellow card) 90+2'	Stadium: Stadion Galgenwaard; Attendance: 17,880; Referee: Jochem Kamphuis

9 November 2013 13	Vitesse	3–1	Utrecht	Arnhem
19:45	Atsu 31' (pen.); Vejinović (yellow card) 36'; Leerdam (yellow card) 64'; Havenaar 86'; Pröpper 90+3'	Summary	Heerings (yellow card) 30'; De Ridder 63' (pen.)	Stadium: GelreDome; Attendance: 16,779; Referee: Pol van Boekel

24 November 2013 14	Utrecht	3–0	ADO Den Haag	Utrecht
12:30	De Ridder (yellow card) 22', (goal) 41'; Ayoub 45+1'; Heerings 53', (yellow card) 79'; Takagi (yellow card) 68'; Van der Maarel (red card) 75'	Summary	Malone (yellow card) 30'; Zuiverloon (yellow card) 87'	Stadium: Stadion Galgenwaard; Attendance: 13,800; Referee: Kevin Blom

30 November 2013 15	Heracles	1–2	Utrecht	Almelo
20:45	Bel Hassani 27'; Pasveer (yellow card) 56'; Bruns (yellow card) 60'; Rosheuvel (yellow card) 71'	Summary	Toornstra 55', 81'	Stadium: Polman Stadion; Attendance: 8,169; Referee: Dennis Higler

6 December 2013 16	Utrecht	2–0	NEC	Utrecht
20:00	Markiet 48'; Bulthuis (yellow card) 74'; De Ridder 78'	Summary	Koolwijk (yellow card) 43' (yellow-red card) 67'; Jahanbakhsh (yellow card) 59'	Stadium: Stadion Galgenwaard; Attendance: 15,034; Referee: Jeroen Sanders

15 December 2013 17	Utrecht	1–5	PSV	Utrecht
16:30	De Ridder (yellow card) 27' (yellow-red card) 69'; Van der Maarel (yellow card) 32'; Markiet (yellow card) 33'; Bulthuis (yellow card) 70' (yellow-red card) 90', (goal) 74'	Summary	Maher 3', 90+2'; Depay 13', 33' (pen.); Rekik (yellow card) 20' locadia 30'; Arias (yellow card) 57'; Hiljemark (yellow card) 80'	Stadium: Stadion Galgenwaard; Attendance: 20,011; Referee: Pol van Boekel

22 December 2013 18	Go Ahead Eagles	2–1	Utrecht	Deventer
14:30	Rijsdijk 14'; Van der Linden 74' (pen.)	Summary	Badjeck 4'; Oar (yellow card) 11'; Derijck (yellow card) 58'; Van der Maarel (yellow card) 73'	Stadium: De Adelaarshorst; Attendance: 7,358; Referee: Reinold Wiedemeijer

19 January 2014 19	Utrecht	2–5	Feyenoord	Utrecht
14:30	Toornstra 12', 22'	Summary	Schaken 17', 72'; Pellè 18'; Vilhena (yellow card) 22', (goal) 89'; De Vrij 33'	Stadium: Stadion Galgenwaard; Referee: Pieter Vink

25 January 2014 20	Roda JC	1–0	Utrecht	Kerkrade
19:45	Hupperts 34'	Summary	Heerings (yellow card) 27'	Stadium: Parkstad Limburg Stadion; Attendance: 12,905; Referee: Eric Braamhaar

2 February 2014 21	Utrecht	1–1	Ajax	Utrecht
12:30	De Ridder 33'	Summary	Van Rhijn (yellow card) 16'; Blind 25'	Stadium: Stadion Galgenwaard; Attendance: 19,245; Referee: Richard Liesveld

6 February 2014 22	Utrecht	1–2	PEC Zwolle	Utrecht
18:45	Agudelo 24'; Sarota (red card) 58'; De Ridder (yellow card) 76'	Summary	Broerse (yellow card) 67'; Mahmudov 74'; Benson 77'	Stadium: Stadion Galgenwaard; Attendance: 15,831; Referee: Jeroen Sanders

9 February 2014 23	RKC Waalwijk	5–2	Utrecht	Waalwijk
14:30	Castelen 8'; D. De Ridder 79'; Anderson 81'; Duits (yellow card) 87'; Beauguel 90'; Joachim 90+3'	Summary	Toornstra 10' (pen.); S. De Ridder 83'	Stadium: Mandemakers Stadion; Attendance: 5,712; Referee: Martin van den Kerkhof

15 February 2014 24	AZ	1–1	Utrecht	Alkmaar
20:45	Jóhannsson 21'; Gudelj (yellow card) 86'	Summary	Toornstra 55'	Stadium: AFAS Stadion; Attendance: 15,489; Referee: Dennis Higler

23 February 2014 25	Utrecht	1–0	Groningen	Utrecht
12:30	Delpierre (yellow card) 27'; Oar (yellow card) 65'; Agudelo (yellow card) 66'; Mårtensson 88'	Summary	De Leeuw (yellow card) 47'; Hateboer (yellow card) 83'	Stadium: Stadion Galgenwaard; Attendance: 17,214; Referee: Ed Janssen

2 March 2014 26	Utrecht	1–1	Twente	Utrecht
12:30	Van der Maarel (yellow card) 24'; Oar 46'; Toornstra (yellow card) 69'	Summary	Promes 18'; Koppers (yellow card) 19'; Martina (yellow card) 69'	Stadium: Stadion Galgenwaard; Attendance: 16,666; Referee: Tom van Sichem

8 March 2014 27	PSV	1–0	Utrecht	Eindhoven
20:45	Schaars (yellow card) 40'; Locadia 51'	Summary	De Ridder (yellow card) 21'; Toornstra (yellow card) 41'; Heerings (yellow card) 55'; Delpierre (yellow card) 85'; Van der Gun (yellow card) 87'	Stadium: Philips Stadion; Attendance: 33,200; Referee: Serdar Gözübüyük

16 March 2014 28	NEC	2–2	Utrecht	Nijmegen
14:30	Higdon 24'; Jantscher 60'; Štefánik (yellow card) 79'	Summary	Bulthuis 22'; Van der Maarel (yellow card) 37'; Toornstra 44'; De Ridder (yellow card) 76'; Agudelo (yellow card) 90+1'	Stadium: Stadion de Goffert; Attendance: 11,200; Referee: Eric Braamhaar

28 March 2014 30	NAC Breda	2–2	Utrecht	Breda
20:00	Verbeek 58'; Poepon 58'	Summary	Bulthuis 86'; Van der Gun 90'	Stadium: Rat Verlegh Stadion; Attendance: 18,100; Referee: Dennis Higler

2 April 2014 29	Utrecht	1–0	Cambuur	Utrecht
18:45	Mulenga 56'; Oar (yellow card) 89'	Summary	El Makrini (yellow card) 23'; Bijker (red card) 67'; Van der Laan (yellow card) 84'	Stadium: Stadion Galgenwaard; Attendance: 17,531; Referee: Björn Kuipers

6 April 2014 31	ADO Den Haag	4–1	Utrecht	The Hague
12:30	Holla (yellow card) 4'; Alberg 31'; Van Duinen 42'; Schet 69'; Kramer 75'	Summary	De Ridder (yellow card) 4' (yellow-red card) 24'; Van der Gun (yellow card) 32'; Toornstra 90'	Stadium: Kyocera Stadion; Attendance: 8,500; Referee: Bas Nijhuis

13 April 2014 32	Utrecht	2–1	Heracles	Utrecht
14:30	Mulenga 19'; Ruiter (yellow card) 35'; Agudelo 40'; Diemers (yellow card) 80'	Summary	Linssen (yellow card) 35'; Schenkeveld (yellow card) 42' (yellow-red card) 85'; Rosheuvel 64'; Reinstra (yellow card) 85'; Bruns (yellow card) 90+2'	Stadium: Stadion Galgenwaard; Attendance: 19,004; Referee: Tom van Sichem

27 April 2014 33	Heerenveen	4–1	Utrecht	Heerenveen
14:30	De Roon 39'; Ziyech 67'; Van Aken 81'; Finnbogason 90+1'	Summary	Mulenga 90'	Stadium: Abe Lenstra Stadion; Attendance: 24,600; Referee: Dennis Higler

3 May 2014 34	Utrecht	2–1	Vitesse	Utrecht
18:45	De Ridder 40'; Bulthuis (yellow card) 59'; Agudelo 78'	Summary	Labyad 68'	Stadium: Stadion Galgenwaard; Attendance: 19,504; Referee: Richard Liesveld

=== Europa League Qualification ===
18 July 2013 Second qualifying round first leg	Differdange 03 (Luxembourg)	2–1	(Netherlands) Utrecht	Luxembourg
19:30 CEST	Er Rafik 26', 57'	Report	Mulenga 2'	Stadium: Stade Josy Barthel; Attendance: 2,591; Referee: Alain Bieri

25 July 2013 Second qualifying round second leg	Utrecht (Netherlands)	3–3	(Luxembourg) Differdange 03	Utrecht
19:30 CEST	Mulenga 45', 49', 54'	Report	Er Rafik 25'; Franzoni 64' (pen.); Bastos 72'	Stadium: Stadion Galgenwaard; Attendance: 16,437; Referee: Nikolay Yordanov

Differdange 03 won 5–4 on aggregate.

=== KNVB Cup ===
25 September 2013 Round 2	Utrecht	4–1	Den Bosch	Utrecht
20:00	Toornstra 15', 47'; Markiet 53'; De Ridder 84'	Summary	Van der Maarel 69' (o.g.)	Stadium: Stadion Galgenwaard; Attendance: 8,5550; Referee: Serdar Gözübüyük

29 October 2013 Round 3	Kozakken Boys	1–2 (a.e.t.)	Utrecht	Werkendam
20:15	Irilmazbilek 26'; Lucius (yellow card) 110'	Summary	Van der Maarel (yellow card) 24'; De Ridder (yellow card) 58'; Mulenga 63'; Toornstra 93'	Stadium: Sportpark De Zwaaier; Attendance: 4,000; Referee: Eric Braamhaar

18 December 2013 Last 16	Cambuur	0–2	Utrecht	Leeuwarden
20:00	Barto (yellow card) 60'; Lukoki (yellow card) 69'	Summary	Nienhuis 13' (o.g.); De Ridder 79'; Oar (yellow card) 90+1'	Stadium: Cambuur Stadion; Referee: Richard Liesveld

22 January 2014 Quarter-finals	NEC	1–0	Utrecht	Nijmegen
19:45	Vermijl 8'; Jantscher (yellow card) 21'; Rieks (yellow card) 38'; Haitz (yellow card) 82'	Summary	Van der Maarel (yellow card) 34'; Ayoub (yellow card) 57'; Badjeck (yellow card) 61'; Toornstra (yellow card) 83'	Stadium: Stadion de Goffert; Attendance: 6,000; Referee: Tom van Sichem
