= 2021–22 Go Ahead Eagles season =

Go Ahead Eagles
2021–22 season
- Chairman: Jan Willem van Dop
- Head coach: Kees van Wonderen
- Stadium: De Adelaarshorst
- Eredivisie: 12th
- KNVB Cup: First round
- Highest home attendance: 6,650 (vs. SC Heerenveen, 13 August 2021)
- Lowest home attendance: 6,650 (vs. SC Heerenveen, 13 August 2021)
- Average home league attendance: 6,650
- Biggest defeat: 0–2 (vs. Feyenoord, 22 August 2021)

The 2021–22 season is the 119th season in the existence of Go Ahead Eagles and the club's first season back in the top flight of Dutch football. In addition to the domestic league, Go Ahead Eagles will participate in this season's editions of the KNVB Cup.

== Players ==
=== First-team squad ===
As of 2 June 2021

Note: Flags indicate national team as defined under FIFA eligibility rules; some limited exceptions apply. Players may hold more than one non-FIFA nationality.

No.	Pos.	Nation	Player
1	GK	NED	Mitchel Michaelis
2	DF	NED	Wout Droste
4	DF	NED	Jeroen Veldmate (captain)
5	DF	NED	Bas Kuipers
6	MF	NED	Jay Idzes
7	FW	NED	Martijn Berden
8	MF	NED	Luuk Brouwers
9	FW	FRA	Antoine Rabillard
10	MF	TUR	Erkan Eyibil
11	FW	NED	Kevin van Kippersluis
14	MF	NED	Zakaria Eddahchouri
15	DF	GER	Nicolas Abdat

No.	Pos.	Nation	Player
16	GK	NED	Alessio Budel
17	MF	SCO	Frank Ross
18	FW	NED	Sam Crowther
19	FW	NED	Sam Hendriks
20	GK	NED	Jay Gorter
22	DF	NED	Julliani Eersteling
23	FW	NED	Quiermo Dumay
25	DF	NED	Boyd Lucassen
26	DF	NED	Justin Bakker
27	DF	ZAM	Jacob Mulenga
30	MF	GRE	Giannis Fivos Botos (on loan from AEK Athens)
—	DF	NED	Joris Kramer (on loan from AZ Alkmaar)

== Pre-season and friendlies ==
Win Draw Loss Fixtures

3 July 2021 Friendly	Go Ahead Eagles (Netherlands)	1–1	(Netherlands) RKC Waalwijk	Netherlands
18:30 CEST (UTC+2)
Note: three halves of 30 minutes.

10 July 2021 Friendly	Heracles Almelo (Netherlands)	Cancelled	(Netherlands) Go Ahead Eagles	Almelo, Netherlands
13:00 CEST (UTC+2)				Stadium: Erve Asito

23 July 2021 Friendly	Go Ahead Eagles (Netherlands)	1–1	(Netherlands) Vitesse	Netherlands
19:00 CEST (UTC+2)

24 July 2021 Friendly	Jong FC Utrecht (Netherlands)	Cancelled	(Netherlands) Go Ahead Eagles	Netherlands
14:00 CEST (UTC+2)

31 July 2021 Friendly	Sparta Nijkerk (Netherlands)	Cancelled	(Netherlands) Go Ahead Eagles	Netherlands
12:30 CEST (UTC+2)

31 July 2021 Friendly	Go Ahead Eagles (Netherlands)	Cancelled	(Netherlands) Willem II	Netherlands
19:30 CEST (UTC+2)

31 July 2021 Friendly	Go Ahead Eagles (Netherlands)	1–2	(Netherlands) FC Emmen	Netherlands
19:30 CEST (UTC+2)

7 August 2021 Friendly	Go Ahead Eagles (Netherlands)	Cancelled	(Germany) SV Rödinghausen	Deventer, Netherlands
19:00 CEST (UTC+2)				Stadium: De Adelaarshorst

== Competitions ==
=== Overall record ===
Competition	First match	Last match	Starting round	Record							
Competition	First match	Last match	Starting round	Pld	W	D	L	GF	GA	GD	Win %
Eredivisie	14–15 August 2021	15 May 2021	Matchday 1	15	6	2	7	19	25	−6	40.00
KNVB Cup	27 October 2021		First round	1	1	0	0	2	0	+2	100.00
Total				16	7	2	7	21	25	−4	43.75

Last updated: 5 December 2021
Source: Soccerway

=== Eredivisie ===
==== League table ====
Pos	Team	Pld	W	D	L	GF	GA	GD	Pts
11	NEC	34	10	8	16	38	52	−14	38
12	Groningen	34	9	9	16	41	55	−14	36
13	Go Ahead Eagles	34	10	6	18	37	51	−14	36
14	Sparta Rotterdam	34	8	11	15	30	48	−18	35
15	Fortuna Sittard	34	10	5	19	36	67	−31	35

Source: Eredivisie
Rules for classification: Season in progress: 1) Most points won; 2) Less points lost; 3) Goal difference; 4) Goals scored; 5) Alphabetical order; End of season: 1) Points; 2) Goal difference; 3) Goals scored; 4) Head-to-head points; 5) Head-to-head goal difference; 6) Head-to-head away goals scored; 7) Play-off if relevant for deciding champion, relegation or participating in a European league, otherwise by draw. 8) Penalty shoot-out (only after a play-off)

==== Results summary ====
Overall								Home						Away					
Pld	W	D	L	GF	GA	GD	Pts	W	D	L	GF	GA	GD	W	D	L	GF	GA	GD
2	0	0	2	0	3	−3	0	0	0	1	0	1	−1	0	0	1	0	2	−2

Last updated: 5 December 2021.
Source: Eredivisie

==== Results by round ====
Round	1	2	3
Ground	H	A	
Result	L	L	
Position	14	16	

Updated to match(es) played on 5 December 2021. Source: Eredivisie
A = Away; H = Home; W = Win; D = Draw; L = Loss

==== Matches ====
The league fixtures were announced on 11 June 2021.

13 August 2021 1	Go Ahead Eagles	0–1	SC Heerenveen	Deventer
20:00 CEST (UTC+2)		Report	Halilović 6'	Stadium: De Adelaarshorst; Attendance: 6,650; Referee: Kevin Blom

22 August 2021 2	Feyenoord	2–0	Go Ahead Eagles	Rotterdam
14:30 CEST(UTC+2)	Linssen 60', 87'; Burger (yellow card) 84'	Report	Kuipers (yellow card) 78'	Stadium: De Kuip; Attendance: 34,384; Referee: Rob Dieperink

28 August 2021 3	Go Ahead Eagles	2–0	Sparta Rotterdam	Deventer
20:00 CEST (UTC+2)		Report		Stadium: De Adelaarshorst; Referee: Jannick van der Laan

22 September 2021 6	Go Ahead Eagles	1–2	PSV	Deventer
18:45 CEST (UTC+2)	Córdoba 55'	Report	Gakpo 15'; Max (yellow card) 23'; Obispo (yellow card) 81'; Van Ginkel 86'	Stadium: De Adelaarshorst; Referee: Bas Nijhuis

7 November 2021 12	Ajax	0–0	Go Ahead Eagles	Amsterdam
20:00 CET (UTC+1)	Martínez (yellow card) 42'; Álvarez (yellow card) 49'	Report	Lucassen (yellow card) 90'	Stadium: Johan Cruyff Arena (roof open); Attendance: 53,497; Referee: Rob Dieperink

5 December 2021 15	Go Ahead Eagles	1–2	FC Twente	Deventer
--:-- CET (UTC+1)				Stadium: De Adelaarshorst

11 December 2021 16	FC Utrecht	v	Go Ahead Eagles	Utrecht
18:45 CET (UTC+1)				Stadium: Stadion Galgenwaard

27 February 2022 24	Go Ahead Eagles	v	Ajax	Deventer
--:-- CET (UTC+1)				Stadium: De Adelaarshorst

6 March 2022 25	Go Ahead Eagles	v	FC Utrecht	Deventer
--:-- CET (UTC+1)				Stadium: De Adelaarshorst

=== KNVB Cup ===
27 October 2021 First round	Almere City	0–2	Go Ahead Eagles	Almere
20:00 CEST				Stadium: Yanmar Stadion

15 December 2021 Second round	Go Ahead Eagles	v	Roda JC	Deventer
20:00 CET(UTC+1)				Stadium: De Adelaarshorst
