= Jacob Mulenga =

Zambian footballer (born 1984)

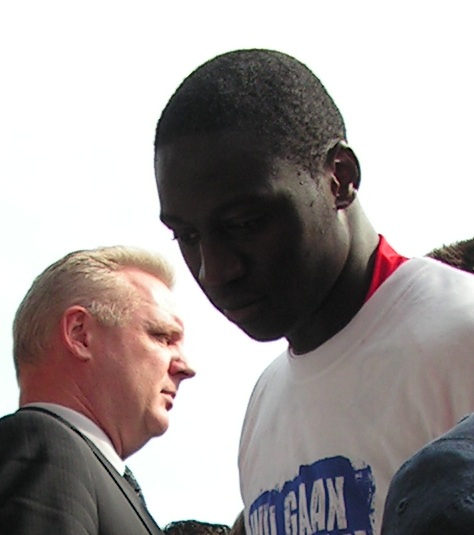
- Mulenga with Utrecht in 2010

Personal information
- Date of birth: 12 February 1984 (age 42)
- Place of birth: Kitwe, Zambia
- Height: 1.86 m (6 ft 1 in)
- Position: Forward

Youth career
- 2000–2002: Afrisport

Senior career*
Years	Team	Apps	(Gls)
2002–2004	Afrisport	44	(32)
2004–2009	Châteauroux	109	(27)
2007–2008	→ Strasbourg (loan)	22	(1)
2009–2014	Utrecht	93	(37)
2014–2015	Adana Demirspor	15	(8)
2015–2017	Shijiazhuang Ever Bright	72	(27)
2018–2019	Liaoning Hongyun	47	(22)
2020–2022	Go Ahead Eagles	46	(7)
Total		448	(161)

International career
2004–2014	Zambia	46	(10)
- * Club domestic league appearances and goals

Jacob Mulenga (born 12 February 1984) is a Zambian former professional footballer who played as a striker.

Mulenga started his footballing career at age 18 with hometown club Afrisport, before moving to Châteauroux in 2004. Five years later, he moved to FC Utrecht where he made his definitive breakthrough but also suffered two serious knee injuries. After successful stints in Turkey and China, Mulenga returned to the Netherlands in 2020 where he signed for Go Ahead Eagles.

Between 2004 and 2014, he made 46 appearances scoring ten goals for the Zambia national team.

== Club career ==
Mulenga started his career with the Zambian third-tier club Afrisport from his hometown of Kitwe at a relatively late age – he only started playing organised football as an 18-year old. With Afrisport whom he reached promotion in the 2003 season. In December 2003, he trialled together with fellow countryman Collins Mbesuma at French club Stade Rennais. However, both were unable to gain a contract, after which Mulenga returned to Afrisport. He had a strong season there, including four goals during the first three matches. In the summer of 2004, he returned to France for a trial period at Bastia alongside Billy Mwanza. After the Corsican club did not offer him a contract, LB Châteauroux showed interest in him and he was subsequently signed on a four-year contract. Mulenga thus became the second Zambian in the French professional divisions, after Andrew Tembo who played for Marseille in 1994.

In his Ligue 2 debut on 24 August 2004, Mulenga scored both goals in a 2–0 win over Chamois Niortais. In the ensuing period, however, he suffered a large number of injuries, limiting his appearances in the league that year to 15. In the two seasons that followed, he played more often, but his goalscoring stagnated. In August 2007, he was sent on a one-season loan to Ligue 1 club RC Strasbourg. After this period the Zambian returned to Châteauroux.

In late May 2009, the club announced that Mulenga had been signed by Dutch Eredivisie club FC Utrecht, who, after a disappointing season, had been looking for a striker and eventually signed him on a three-year contract. On 31 October 2010, in a match against ADO Den Haag, he tore his right cruciate ligament and was sidelined for the entire 2010–11 season. On 14 August 2011, Mulenga made his comeback and marked this by turning a 0–2 deficit against De Graafschap into a 2–2 final result after scoring two goals. In a match against Ajax on 9 November, however, he tore his left cruciate ligament and was sidelined for eight months.

In August 2014, Mulenga signed with Turkish club Adana Demirspor, before moving to Chinese football six months later. He moved from Shijiazhuang Ever Bright to Liaoning Hongyun in January 2018, where he, in October 2018, became team captain. In February 2020, he signed a contract extension until the end of 2020. In April 2020, it was announced that Mulenga was suing his club, after not receiving his salary throughout the 2019 season. In May 2020, Liaoning Hongyun went bankrupt and Mulenga was left without a club.

In October 2020, he joined Dutch second-tier Eerste Divisie club Go Ahead Eagles as a free agent. He immediately scored in his debut on 17 October, after coming on as a substitute in the 69th minute against FC Eindhoven, as Go Ahead won 3–0.

On 30 April 2022, Mulenga announced his retirement from football after the 2021–22 season. He scored in his last match as a professional footballer, a 3–1 league loss to SC Heerenveen, after having come on as a substitute.

== International career ==
Mulenga progressed through several national Zambian youth teams and was called up to the senior team in a match against Sudan in May 2004, at the age of twenty, because of his good performances in the second division of Zambia. In the 2006 FIFA World Cup qualifiers, he scored against Togo in the first match of the group stage. However, the third place in the standings was not enough for Zambia to qualify for the World Cup. The country did however manage to qualify for the 2006 Africa Cup of Nations at the expense of the DR Congo and Mali. Due to an injury, Mulenga did receive any caps during this tournament, but two years later he was part of the team's starting eleven during the 2008 Africa Cup of Nations, and scored the 2–0 goal in a 3–0 win over Sudan. Zambia did not advance from the group stage in this tournament. Mulenga also had to cancel due to an injury for the 2012 Africa Cup of Nations.

== Personal life ==
Mulenga is a Christian.

== Career statistics ==
=== Club ===
Appearances and goals by club, season and competition
Club	Season	League			National cup		League cup		Continental		Total	
Club	Season	Division	Apps	Goals	Apps	Goals	Apps	Goals	Apps	Goals	Apps	Goals
Châteauroux	2004–05	Ligue 2	15	5	1	1	1	0	2 (Note: Appearances in UEFA Cup)	0	19	6
Châteauroux	2005–06	Ligue 2	25	6	1	0	2	0	—		28	6
Châteauroux	2006–07	Ligue 2	38	7	2	1	1	1	—		41	9
Châteauroux	2007–08	Ligue 2	4	0	0	0	0	0	—		4	0
Châteauroux	2008–09	Ligue 2	27	9	0	0	2	2	—		29	11
Châteauroux	Total		109	27	4	2	6	3	2	0	121	32
Strasbourg (loan)	2007–08	Ligue 1	22	1	0	0	0	0	0	0	22	1
Utrecht	2009–10	Eredivisie	29	8	1	0	—		4 (Note: Four appearances and two goals in the European competition playoffs)	2	34	10
Utrecht	2010–11	Eredivisie	9	3	1	1	—		7 (Note: Appearances in UEFA Europa League)	0	17	4
Utrecht	2011–12	Eredivisie	11	7	1	0	—		—		12	7
Utrecht	2012–13	Eredivisie	28	14	0	0	—		3 (Note: Three appearances in the European competition playoffs)	0	31	14
Utrecht	2013–14	Eredivisie	16	5	1	1	—		2	4	19	10
Utrecht	Total		93	37	4	2	—		16	6	106	43
Adana Demirspor	2014–15	TFF First League	15	8	0	0	—		—		15	8
Shijiazhuan Ever Bright	2015	Chinese Super League	30	13	0	0	—		—		30	13
Shijiazhuan Ever Bright	2016	Chinese Super League	12	0	0	0	—		—		12	0
Shijiazhuan Ever Bright	2017	China League One	30	14	1	0	—		—		31	14
Shijiazhuan Ever Bright	Total		72	27	1	0	—		—		73	27
Liaoning Hongyun	2018	China League One	25	14	0	0	—		—		25	14
Liaoning Hongyun	2019	China League One	22	8	0	0	—		—		22	8
Liaoning Hongyun	Total		47	22	0	0	—		—		47	22
Go Ahead Eagles	2020–21	Eerste Divisie	28	6	3	0	—		—		31	6
Go Ahead Eagles	2021–22	Eredivisie	18	1	1	0	—		—		19	1
Go Ahead Eagles	2022–23	Eredivisie	0	0	0	0	—		—		0	0
Go Ahead Eagles	Total		46	7	4	0	—		—		50	7
Career total			404	129	13	4	6	3	18	6	441	142

=== International ===
Appearances and goals by national team and year
National team	Year	Apps	Goals
Zambia	2004	7	2
Zambia	2007	3	1
Zambia	2008	10	1
Zambia	2009	6	0
Zambia	2010	6	1
Zambia	2011	1	0
Zambia	2012	1	0
Zambia	2013	7	4
Zambia	2014	5	1
Total		46	10

Scores and results list Zambia's goal tally first, score column indicates score after each Mulenga goal.

List of international goals scored by Jacob Mulenga
No.	Date	Venue	Opponent	Score	Result	Competition	Ref.
1	5 June 2004	Independence Stadium, Lusaka, Zambia	Togo	1–0	1–0	2006 FIFA World Cup qualification	
2	31 July 2004	Independence Stadium, Lusaka, Zambia	Mauritius	1–0	3–1	2004 COSAFA Cup	
3	2 June 2007	Konkola Stadium, Chililabombwe, Zambia	Congo	1–0	3–0	2008 Africa Cup of Nations qualification	
4	22 January 2008	Baba Yara Stadium, Kumasi, Ghana	Sudan	2–0	3–0	2008 Africa Cup of Nations	
5	13 January 2010	Estádio Nacional da Tundavala, Lubango, Angola	Tunisia	1–0	1–1	2010 Africa Cup of Nations	
6	8 June 2013	Levy Mwanawasa Stadium, Ndola, Zambia	Lesotho	1–0	4–0	2014 FIFA World Cup qualification	
7	8 June 2013	Levy Mwanawasa Stadium, Ndola, Zambia	Lesotho	3–0	4–0	2014 FIFA World Cup qualification	
8	15 June 2013	Levy Mwanawasa Stadium, Ndola, Zambia	Sudan	1–0	1–1	2014 FIFA World Cup qualification	
9	14 August 2013	Saint-Leu-la-Forêt, France	Senegal	1–0	1–1	Friendly	
10	10 September 2014	Estádio Nacional, Praia, Cape Verde	Cape Verde	1–1	1–2	2015 Africa Cup of Nations qualification	
