= Gévero Markiet =

Dutch footballer (born 1991)

Personal information
- Date of birth: 8 April 1991 (age 35)
- Place of birth: Amsterdam, Netherlands
- Height: 1.87 m (6 ft 2 in)
- Position: Centre-back

Team information
- Current team: AFC
- Number: 3

Youth career
- Geinburgia
- –2005: FC Omniworld
- 2005–2013: Utrecht

Senior career*
Years	Team	Apps	(Gls)
2009–2016	Utrecht	58	(4)
2015–2016	→ Helmond Sport (loan)	30	(3)
2017	FC 08 Homburg	11	(0)
2017	Helmond Sport	6	(0)
2017–2019	IJsselmeervogels	36	(3)
2019–	AFC	165	(3)
- * Club domestic league appearances and goals as of 15:26, 24 October 2026 (UTC)

Gévero Markiet (born 8 April 1991) is a Dutch footballer who plays as a centre-back for Tweede Divisie club AFC.

Born in Amsterdam, Markiet came through the FC Utrecht academy and made his Eredivisie debut at 17 in 2008. He became a first-team regular in 2013–14 and made 58 Eredivisie appearances for Utrecht, before spells with Helmond Sport, German club FC 08 Homburg and IJsselmeervogels. He joined AFC in 2019.

== Early life and career ==
Markiet was born in Amsterdam. He began playing football at Geinburgia and moved through FC Omniworld into the FC Utrecht academy.

== Club career ==
=== FC Utrecht ===
Markiet made his Eredivisie debut on 30 August 2008, aged 17, in a 5–1 home defeat to PSV at Stadion Galgenwaard. He came on for Sander Keller in the 69th minute. He spent the next two seasons with the club's under-19 side and Jong FC Utrecht. His second first-team appearance came almost three years later—on 18 February 2011—against Heracles Almelo, when he replaced Mark van der Maarel at half-time.

Markiet established himself in the 2013–14 season, making 20 Eredivisie appearances. In July 2013, he started both legs of Utrecht's UEFA Europa League second qualifying round tie against Differdange 03 of Luxembourg. Utrecht lost 2–1 away and drew 3–3 at home to go out 5–4 on aggregate. In 2014–15, he played 29 league matches and scored three goals. He made 58 Eredivisie appearances for Utrecht in total.

Markiet later said he lost his place after Erik ten Hag became head coach in 2015. On 31 August 2015, Utrecht loaned him to Eerste Divisie club Helmond Sport until the end of the season. He later called the move a big mistake, saying it was hard to return to the Eredivisie from the second tier.

=== Helmond Sport and Homburg ===
Markiet played 30 league matches for Helmond in 2015–16 and scored three goals. In January 2017, he moved to Germany to join Regionalliga Südwest club FC 08 Homburg, where he made eleven league appearances. He returned to Helmond in August 2017 on an amateur basis but left in October after six league matches.

=== IJsselmeervogels ===
In October 2017, Markiet joined Tweede Divisie club IJsselmeervogels. He made 36 league appearances and scored three goals over two seasons. By the 2018–19 season, he had little prospect of playing time.

=== AFC ===
On 6 February 2019, AFC announced Markiet as their first signing for the following season. IJsselmeervogels were then AFC's main rivals for the Tweede Divisie title. Markiet had approached the club through midfielder Kenny Teijsse, a former teammate from the Utrecht academy. He said Amsterdam was his city and that much of his family lived there.

On 18 December 2024, Markiet started against his former club Utrecht in the second round of the KNVB Cup at Sportpark Goed Genoeg. Utrecht won 8–0 in front of 2,500 spectators. He remained with AFC into the 2026–27 season, his eighth at the club.
