= Johan Mårtensson =

Swedish footballer

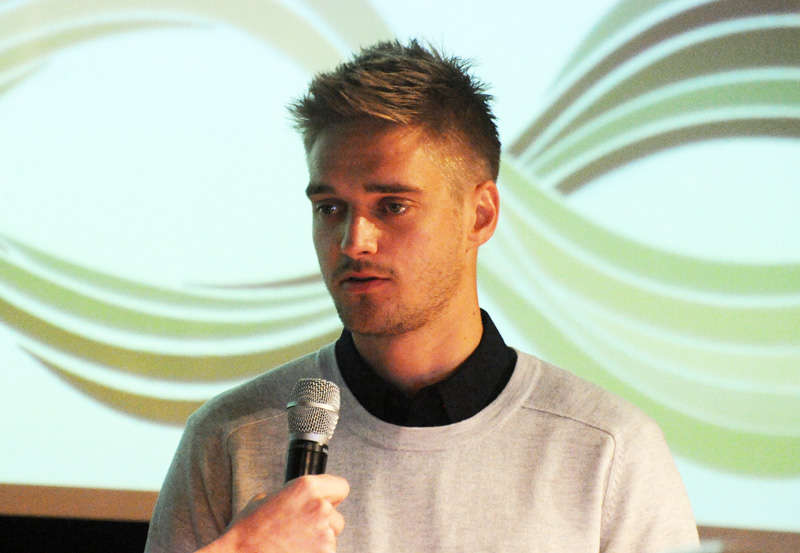

Personal information
- Full name: Johan Daniel Mårtensson
- Date of birth: 16 February 1989 (age 37)
- Place of birth: Skövde, Sweden
- Height: 1.80 m (5 ft 11 in)
- Position: Midfielder

Senior career*
Years	Team	Apps	(Gls)
2007–2008	Ulvåkers IF		
2008	→ Skövde AIK (loan)	10	(5)
2008–2011	GAIS	78	(1)
2011–2014	FC Utrecht	64	(2)
2014–2016	Helsingborgs IF	73	(0)
2017–2021	Örebro SK	113	(6)
2022–2023	Panetolikos	42	(0)
2023–2024	Degerfors	30	(1)

International career
2008	Sweden U19	5	(0)
2009–2010	Sweden U21	7	(0)
2015	Sweden	2	(1)
- * Club domestic league appearances and goals

Johan Daniel Mårtensson (born 16 February 1989) is a Swedish former professional footballer who played as a midfielder.

== Club career ==
=== GAIS ===
During his career at GAIS, he first came from the third-tier club Skövde AIK and, therefore, had some time to adapt to compete at a higher level. Mårtensson progressed and had shortly became a key player at GAIS's midfield. He was capped several times for the Swedish U21 team.

=== FC Utrecht ===
On 9 July 2011, both GAIS and FC Utrecht confirmed that Mårtensson had signed a four-year contract with the Dutch side.

== International career ==
Mårtensson was included in the Sweden squad for their friendly against Ivory Coast on 15 January 2015, scoring on his debut.

== Career statistics ==
=== International ===
International goals

Score and result list Sweden's goal tally first.

#	Date	Venue	Opponent	Score	Result	Competition
1.	15 January 2015	Zayed Sports City Stadium, Abu Dhabi, United Arab Emirates	Ivory Coast	1–0	2–0	Friendly
