= Kevin van Diermen =

Dutch footballer (born 1989)

Personal information
- Full name: Kevin Robin van Diermen
- Date of birth: 3 July 1989 (age 37)
- Place of birth: Spakenburg, Netherlands
- Height: 1.86 m (6 ft 1 in)
- Position: Centre back

Youth career
- 1995–2001: IJsselmeervogels
- 2001–2006: Vitesse

Senior career*
Years	Team	Apps	(Gls)
2006–2012	Vitesse	40	(0)
2011	→ Go Ahead Eagles (loan)	8	(1)
2012–2016	Excelsior	88	(2)
2016	→ NAC (loan)	11	(2)
2016–2017	NAC	15	(1)
2017–2018	De Graafschap	33	(0)
2018–2021	IJsselmeervogels	45	(1)
Total		240	(7)

International career
2007	Netherlands U18	2	(0)
- * Club domestic league appearances and goals

Kevin van Diermen (born 3 July 1989) is a Dutch retired footballer who plays as a centre back.

== Club career ==
He formerly played for Vitesse, who loaned him for six months to Go Ahead Eagles, Excelsior and NAC, where he joined his former coach at Excelsior, Marinus Dijkhuizen. He also had a season with De Graafschap, before finishing his career at childhood club IJsselmeervogels.

== International career ==
Van Diermen played twice for the Netherlands national under-18 football team.
