= Daan Bovenberg =

Dutch former professional footballer

Personal information
- Date of birth: 25 October 1988 (age 38)
- Place of birth: Utrecht, Netherlands
- Height: 1.83 m (6 ft 0 in)
- Position: Right back

Team information
- Current team: Excelsior (General manager)

Youth career
- Excelsior

Senior career*
Years	Team	Apps	(Gls)
2007–2011	Excelsior	59	(6)
2011–2013	FC Utrecht	17	(3)
2013–2014	NEC	10	(0)
2014–2016	Excelsior	35	(3)
Total		121	(12)
- * Club domestic league appearances and goals

Daan Bovenberg (born 25 October 1988) is a Dutch retired footballer who played as a right back.

Bovenberg is the general manager of Eredivisie outfit Excelsior.

== Career ==
Born in Utrecht, Bovenberg grew up in the Rotterdam area and started his career with Excelsior. After playing a year and a half for FC Utrecht for which he played only 17 matches, Bovenberg left to NEC in January 2013. After losing prospect of playing for NEC, Bovenberg dissolved his contract with the Eredivisie side on 31 January 2014. He returned in professional football in June 2014, as he signed with his former team Excelsior, which had been promoted to the Eredivisie. On 25 May 2016, Bovenberg announced his retirement from professional football, as he had the ambition to develop a career outside of football.
