= Jeff Stans =

Dutch footballer

Personal information
- Date of birth: 20 March 1990 (age 36)
- Place of birth: Vlaardingen, Netherlands
- Height: 1.83 m (6 ft 0 in)
- Position: Attacking midfielder

Youth career
- VFC Vlaardingen
- VV HVO
- Sparta Rotterdam
- 2006–2008: Excelsior Maassluis

Senior career*
Years	Team	Apps	(Gls)
2008–2009	Excelsior Maassluis		
2009–2013	RKC Waalwijk	36	(1)
2013–2016	Excelsior Rotterdam	99	(19)
2016–2018	NAC Breda	18	(1)
2018–2019	Go Ahead Eagles	44	(1)
2019–2021	Helmond Sport	39	(2)

Managerial career
- 2020–2023: SV CWO
- 2023–: Jong Sparta
- * Club domestic league appearances and goals

Jeff Stans (born 20 March 1990) is a Dutch football manager and former player who is the current manager of Jong Sparta. As a player, he played as an attacking midfielder for Excelsior Maassluis, RKC Waalwijk, Excelsior Rotterdam, NAC Breda and Helmond Sport.

== Playing career ==
=== RKC Waalwijk ===
After playing youth football with VFC Vlaardingen, VV HVO, and Sparta Rotterdam, he moved to Excelsior Maassluis in 2006. He broke through into the Excelsior Maassluis first team in the 2008–09 season and moved to RKC Waalwijk in summer 2009. In April 2010, Stans signed a two-year professional contract with RKC Waalwijk, valid until summer 2012, with the option for a further two years. He played 7 times for Waalwijk during the 2010–11 season as the club were promoted to the Eredivisie as champions of the Eerste Divisie. In April 2012, Stans' contract extension was triggered. He made 36 league appearances across three seasons at the club.

=== Excelsior Rotterdam ===
Stans transferred to Excelsior Rotterdam in summer 2013, and signed a three-year contract with the club. In his debut season at the club, Stans recorded 33 league appearances and 4 play-off appearances as Excelsior were promoted to the Eredivisie via the play-offs after beating Stams' former club RKC Waalwijk in the final. Stams recorded an assist in the second leg. Across the 2014–15 Eredivisie season, Stans scored 10 goals as Excelsior avoided relegation, with the club finishing 15th, four points above the relegation play-off places. He scored 6 goals in 32 games in the 2015–16 Eredivisie as Excelsior again finished 15th.

=== NAC Breda ===
On 29 June 2016, it was announced that Stand had joined Eerste Divisie club NAC Breda on a free transfer, signing a three-year contract with the club. Stans turned down the option to stay with Excelsior, and also turned down offers from other Eredivisie clubs, to sign for Breda. He did not live up to expectations in his debut season at Breda, having scored once in 19 appearances, though Breda were promoted to the Eredivisie via the play-offs. Stans did not play for Breda following their promotion, and on 4 January 2018, Stans' contract with the club was terminated with immediate effect.

=== Go Ahead Eagles ===
In February 2018, Stans joined Go Ahead Eagles on trial, and he signed a one-and-a-half year contract with the club on 27 February. He played 44 times in the Eerste Divisie for the club, scoring once, and he left the club at the end of the 2018–19 season.

=== Helmond Sport ===
On 23 August 2019, Stans joined Helmond Sport. He left Helmond Sport upon the expiry of his contract in summer 2021, having scored twice in 39 appearances.

== Managerial career ==
In February 2020, it was announced that he would become manager of amateur club SV CWO from summer 2020, and he went on to spend three seasons with the club. During the 2022–23 season, he also worked as assistant manager at Jong Sparta, whilst he was completing his UEFA A License. In January 2023, Stans was announced as the manager of VV Nieuwenhoorn, of the Vierde Divisie A, starting in summer 2023. However, in summer 2023, he cancelled his contract with Nieuwenhoorn to take the role of manager of Jong Sparta.

== Style of play ==
Stans played as an attacking midfielder. He told BN DeStem in March 2017 that he preferred to play with his back to goal, and get involved in build-up in deeper areas.

== Personal life ==
Stans comes from a footballing family. His uncle Frans played for Fortuna Vlaardingen, whilst his dad and his brother also played for VFC Vlaardingen. He has a son who was born in September 2020.

== Honours ==
=== Club ===
RKC Waalwijk:

- Eerste Divisie: 2010–11
