= Kevin Vermeulen =

Dutch footballer (born 1990)

Personal information
- Date of birth: 20 November 1990 (age 35)
- Place of birth: Zwijndrecht, Netherlands
- Height: 1.88 m (6 ft 2 in)
- Position: Midfielder

Team information
- Current team: Achilles Veen

Youth career
- Feyenoord
- Dordrecht
- XerxesDZB

Senior career*
Years	Team	Apps	(Gls)
2013–2018	Excelsior	130	(10)
2018–2020	RKC Waalwijk	22	(3)
2020–2022	Dordrecht	54	(5)
2022–2024	Kozakken Boys	49	(9)
2024–	Achilles Veen		
- * Club domestic league appearances and goals as of 16 November 2024

Kevin Vermeulen (born 20 November 1990) is a Dutch professional footballer who plays as a midfielder for Achilles Veen. He formerly played for Excelsior, RKC Waalwijk and FC Dordrecht.

== Club career ==
On 1 July 2022, Vermeulen signed a two-year contract with Kozakken Boys.
