= Tom Muyters =

Belgian footballer

Personal information
- Full name: Tom Muyters
- Date of birth: 5 December 1984 (age 41)
- Place of birth: Tongeren, Belgium
- Height: 1.88 m (6 ft 2 in)
- Position: Goalkeeper

Youth career
- KSK Tongeren

Senior career*
| Years | Team | Apps | (Gls) |
| 2001–2007 | MVV | 15 | (0) |
| 2004–2006 | Jong PSV | 20 | (0) |
| 2007–2008 | KVSK United | 38 | (0) |
| 2008–2010 | Sint-Truiden | 6 | (0) |
| 2010–2012 | SV Zulte Waregem | 12 | (0) |
| 2013–2015 | FC Eindhoven | 62 | (0) |
| 2015–2017 | Excelsior | 45 | (0) |
| 2017 | Samsunspor | 15 | (0) |
| 2018–2020 | Roda JC Kerkrade | 48 | (0) |
- * Club domestic league appearances and goals as of 31 December 2020

Tom Muyters (born 5 December 1984 in Tongeren) is a former Belgian professional football goalkeeper, who last played for Roda JC Kerkrade in the Dutch Eerste Divisie.
