= Cedric Badjeck =

Cameroonian-Dutch footballer (1995–2025)

Personal information
- Date of birth: 25 January 1995
- Place of birth: Yaounde, Cameroon
- Date of death: 21 July 2025 (aged 30)
- Place of death: Arnhem, Netherlands
- Height: 1.81 m (5 ft 11 in)
- Position: Forward

Youth career
- IJFC
- Utrecht

Senior career*
Years	Team	Apps	(Gls)
2012–2015	Utrecht	7	(1)
2015–2016	Excelsior	5	(0)
2017–2018	De Treffers	28	(7)
2018–2019	De Treffers Zaterdag		
2019–2020	DFS		
2020–2021	VV Duno	4	(0)
2021–2022	AVW '66		
2022–2024	Prespa Birblik		
2024	VV Duno		
- * Club domestic league appearances and goals

Cedric Badjeck (25 January 1995 – 21 July 2025) was a Cameroonian-Dutch footballer who played as a forward.

== Career ==
Ahead of the 2019–20 season, Badjeck joined Eerste Klasse club SV DFS.

== Death ==
Badjeck died in Arnhem on 21 July 2025, at the age of 30.
