= 2018–19 FC Groningen season =

FC Groningen
2018–19 season
- Head coach: (Netherlands) Danny Buijs
- Stadium: Euroborg
- Eredivisie: 8th
- KNVB Cup: 1st round
- Top goalscorer: League: Mimoun Mahi (8 goals); All: Mimoun Mahi (8 goals)
- Highest home attendance: 22,288 (against AFC Ajax)
- Lowest home attendance: 15,901 (against AZ Alkmaar)
- Average home league attendance: 19,091
- Biggest win: 5-2 (against NAC Breda) and 3-0 (against Heracles Almelo) in Eredivisie
- Biggest defeat: 5-1 (against SBV Vitesse) in Eredivisie
Home colours

FC Groningen finished 2018–19 Eredivisie season as 8th.

The club competed also in the KNVB Cup. FC Groningen lost 2–0 against FC Twente in the 1st round and are eliminated from the cup.

Mimoun Mahi was the top scorer of the club in this season with 8 goals in Eredivisie.

Sergio Padt was the most appeared player in this season with 37 appearances; 36 appearances in Eredivisie and 1 appearance in the KNVB Cup. (3rd consecutive season)

== Players ==
=== First-team squad ===
Note: Flags indicate national team as defined under FIFA eligibility rules; some limited exceptions apply. Players may hold more than one non-FIFA nationality.

No.	Pos.	Nation	Player
1	GK	NED	Sergio Padt
4	DF	NED	Mike te Wierik
5	DF	BIH	Samir Memišević
6	MF	NED	Ludovit Reis
7	MF	JPN	Ritsu Dōan
8	MF	MAR	Iliass Bel Hassani
9	FW	NED	Kaj Sierhuis
9	FW	COL	Mateo Cassierra
10	FW	MAR	Mimoun Mahi
11	FW	DEN	Jannik Pohl
12	DF	NED	Lars Kramer
14	FW	NED	Mohamed El Hankouri
14	FW	MEX	Uriel Antuna
15	MF	NED	Thomas Bruns
16	GK	BEL	Kevin Begois
17	MF	NED	Jesper Drost

No.	Pos.	Nation	Player
17	DF	JPN	Ko Itakura
18	FW	GUI	Ahmad Mendes Moreira
19	FW	NED	Paul Gladon
19	FW	NED	Tom van Weert
20	DF	NED	Amir Absalem
22	MF	NED	Michael Breij
21	DF	NED	Django Warmerdam
23	MF	AUS	Ajdin Hrustic
24	DF	GER	Jeff Chabot
29	DF	GER	Tim Handwerker
31	GK	NED	Jan Hoekstra
36	MF	NED	Tom van de Looi
42	DF	NED	Deyovaisio Zeefuik
45	GK	NED	Pelle Boevink
53	DF	NED	Tapmahoe Sopacua
58	MF	NED	Daniël van Kaam

== Transfers ==
=== In ===
Pos.	Player	Transferred from	Fee	Date
FW	(Guinea) Ahmad Mendes Moreira	(Netherlands) Kozakken Boys	Free	1 Jul 2018
DF	(Germany) Tim Handwerker	(Germany) 1. FC Köln	On loan	14 Aug 2018
DF	(Germany) Jeff Chabot	(Netherlands) Sparta Rotterdam	€1,200,000	16 Jul 2018
FW	(Denmark) Jannik Pohl	(Denmark) AaB Fodbold	Free	29 Aug 2018
MF	(Morocco) Iliass Bel Hassani	(Netherlands) AZ Alkmaar	On loan	1 Jan 2019
FW	(Netherlands) Kaj Sierhuis	(Netherlands) Jong Ajax	On loan	1 Jan 2019
MF	(Netherlands) Thomas Bruns	(Netherlands) SBV Vitesse	On loan	1 Jan 2019
DF	(Japan) Ko Itakura	(England) Manchester City F.C.	On loan	15 Jan 2019
FW	(Netherlands) Mohamed El Hankouri	(Netherlands) Feyenoord	On loan	16 Jan 2019
FW	(Netherlands) Paul Gladon	(England) Wolverhampton Wanderers F.C.	Free	16 Jan 2019

=== Out ===
Pos.	Player	Transferred to	Fee	Date
MF	(Curaçao) Juninho Bacuna	(England) Huddersfield Town A.F.C.	€2,550,000	1 Jul 2018
FW	(South Africa) Lars Veldwijk	(Netherlands) Sparta Rotterdam	Free	1 Jul 2018
MF	(Netherlands) Yoell van Nieff	(Netherlands) Heracles Almelo	Free	1 Jul 2018
DF	(Denmark) Kasper Larsen	(Israel) Maccabi Haifa F.C.	Free	3 Aug 2018
FW	(Netherlands) Tom van Weert	(Denmark) AaB Fodbold	Free	29 Aug 2018
MF	(Netherlands) Jesper Drost	(Netherlands) Heracles Almelo	Free	30 Aug 2018
FW	(Mexico) Uriel Antuna	(England) Manchester City F.C.	End of loan	31 Dec 2018

== Pre-season and friendlies ==
Win Draw Loss

29 July 2018 Friendly	FC Groningen	0-0	SV Werder Bremen	Groningen
14:30		Report		Stadium: Hitachi Capital Mobility Stadium; Attendance: 9,000

== Competitions ==
=== Overall record ===
Competition	First match	Last match	Starting round	Final position	Record							
Competition	First match	Last match	Starting round	Final position	Pld	W	D	L	GF	GA	GD	Win %
Eredivisie	12 August 2018	21 May 2019	Week 1	8th	36	14	6	16	42	45	−3	38.89
KNVB	27 September 2018	27 September 2018	1st round	1st round	1	0	0	1	0	2	−2	0.00
Total					37	14	6	17	42	47	−5	37.84

Source: Competitions

== Eredivisie ==
=== Results summary ===
Overall								Home						Away					
Pld	W	D	L	GF	GA	GD	Pts	W	D	L	GF	GA	GD	W	D	L	GF	GA	GD
34	13	6	15	39	41	−2	45	10	1	6	26	17	+9	3	5	9	13	24	−11

=== Results by round ===
Round	1	2	3	4	5	6	7	8	9	10	11	12	13	14	15	16	17	18	19	20	21	22	23	24	25	26	27	28	29	30	31	32	33	34
Ground	A	H	A	H	A	H	H	A	A	H	A	H	A	H	A	H	A	H	A	A	H	H	A	H	A	H	A	H	H	A	H	A	H	A
Result	L	L	W	L	L	L	D	L	L	L	W	W	L	W	D	L	D	W	L	W	W	W	D	W	D	W	L	W	W	D	L	L	W	L
Position																																		8

A = Away; H = Home; W = Win; D = Draw; L = Loss

=== Matches ===
==== 1st half ====
12 August 2018 Week 1	SBV Vitesse	5-1	FC Groningen	Arnhem
14:30	Bryan Linssen 22'; Matúš Bero 44'; Roy Beerens 62'; Jake Clarke-Salter 66'; Tim Matavž 71'	Report	Ritsu Dōan 38'	Stadium: GelreDome; Attendance: 13,434

17 August 2018 Week 2	FC Groningen	0-1	Willem II	Groningen
20:00		Report	Daniel Crowley 33'	Stadium: Euroborg; Attendance: 16,500

25 August 2018 Week 3	De Graafschap	0-1	FC Groningen	Doetinchem
18:30		Report	Michael Breij 44'	Stadium: De Vijverberg; Attendance: 12,143

2 September 2018 Week 4	FC Groningen	0-1	PEC Zwolle	Groningen
12:15	Vito van Crooij 64'	Report		Stadium: Euroborg; Attendance: 16,014

15 September 2018 Week 5	AFC Ajax	3-0	FC Groningen	Amsterdam
20:45	Klaas-Jan Huntelaar 18' 66' (pen.); Dušan Tadić 76'	Report		Stadium: Johan Cruyff Arena; Attendance: 52,720

23 September 2018 Week 6	FC Groningen	1-3	AZ Alkmaar	Groningen
14:30	Jeff Chabot 25'	Report	Oussama Idrissi 27'; Fredrik Midtsjø 76'; Adam Maher 90'	Stadium: Euroborg; Attendance: 15,901

30 September 2018 Week 7	FC Groningen	1-1	FC Utrecht	Groningen
14:30	Ahmad Mendes Moreira 76'	Report	Sander van de Streek 16'	Stadium: Euroborg; Attendance: 16,293

6 October 2018 Week 8	ADO Den Haag	1-0	FC Groningen	The Hague
18:30	Elson Hooi 32'	Report		Stadium: Bingoal Stadion; Attendance: 11,584

21 October 2018 Week 9	Heracles Almelo	4-1	FC Groningen	Almelo
14:30	Adrián Dalmau 25' 46'; Brandley Kuwas 78' 90+2'	Report	Mimoun Mahi 14'	Stadium: Erve Asito; Attendance: 11,237

27 October 2018 Week 10	FC Groningen	1-2	PSV Eindhoven	Groningen
19:45	Samir Memišević 42' (pen.)	Report	Donyell Malen 45+4'; Denzel Dumfries 86'	Stadium: Euroborg; Attendance: 18,445

2 November 2018 Week 11	Excelsior Rotterdam	2–4	FC Groningen	Rotterdam
20:00	Ryan Koolwijk 36'; Luigi Bruins 59' (pen.)	Report	Mimoun Mahi 26'; Ritsu Dōan 29'; Mateo Cassierra 51'; Jannik Pohl 75'	Stadium: Van Donge & De Roo Stadion; Attendance: 4,257

11 November 2018 Week 12	FC Groningen	2-0	SC Heerenveen	Groningen
12:15	Django Warmerdam 27'; Ritsu Dōan 38'	Report		Stadium: Euroborg; Attendance: 20,731

25 November 2018 Week 13	Feyenoord	1-0	FC Groningen	Rotterdam
14:30	Jens Toornstra 7'	Report		Stadium: De Kuip; Attendance: 45,000

2 December 2018 Week 14	FC Groningen	5-2	NAC Breda	Groningen
16:45	Mimoun Mahi 6' 85'; Ritsu Dōan 58'; Deyovaisio Zeefuik 76'; Samir Memišević 90'	Report	Mikhail Rosheuvel 16'; Mitchell te Vrede 56'	Stadium: Euroborg; Attendance: 18,377

9 December 2018 Week 15	VVV-Venlo	0-0	FC Groningen	Venlo
14:30		Report		Stadium: Covebo Stadion – De Koel; Attendance: 6,668

16 December 2018 Week 16	FC Groningen	1-2	FC Emmen	Groningen
14:30	Mimoun Mahi 87'	Report	Nicklas Pedersen 88' 90+3'	Stadium: Euroborg; Attendance: 21,965

22 December 2018 Week 17	Fortuna Sittard	0-0	FC Groningen	Sittard
18:30		Report		Stadium: Fortuna Sittard Stadion; Attendance: 8,283

==== 2nd half ====
19 Januari 2019 Week 18	FC Groningen	3-0	Heracles Almelo	Groningen
20:45	Samir Memišević 12' (pen.); Thomas Bruns 74' 78'	Report		Stadium: Euroborg; Attendance: 16,143

26 Januari 2019 Week 19	PSV Eindhoven	2-1	FC Groningen	Eindhoven
19:45	Hirving Lozano 15' 19'	Report	Ludovit Reis 34'	Stadium: Philips Stadion; Attendance: 33,900

2 February 2019 Week 20	Willem II	1–2	FC Groningen	Tilburg
19:45	Marios Vrousai 55'	Report	Django Warmerdam 35'; Kaj Sierhuis 37'	Stadium: Koning Willem II Stadion; Attendance: 12,633

10 February 2019 Week 21	FC Groningen	2-1	SBV Vitesse	Groningen
14:30	Kaj Sierhuis 13'; Mohamed El Hankouri 90+1'	Report	Oussama Darfalou 34'	Stadium: Euroborg; Attendance: 16,498

17 February 2019 Week 22	FC Groningen	1-0	Feyenoord	Groningen
14:30		Report	Tonny Vilhena 49'; Nicolai Jørgensen 59'	Stadium: Euroborg; Attendance: 20,259

23 February 2019 Week 23	NAC Breda	0-0	FC Groningen	Breda
20:45		Report		Stadium: Rat Verlegh Stadion; Attendance: 18,572

3 March 2019 Week 24	FC Groningen	3-2	VVV-Venlo	Groningen
14:30	Mimoun Mahi 24' (pen.) 41' (pen.); Iliass Bel Hassani 64'	Report	Danny Post 20'; Peniel Mlapa 46'	Stadium: Euroborg; Attendance: 16,757

8 March 2019 Week 25	FC Utrecht	0-0	FC Groningen	Utrecht
20:00		Report		Stadium: Stadion Galgenwaard; Attendance: 18,146

17 March 2019 Week 26	FC Groningen	1-0	ADO Den Haag	Groningen
14:30	Lex Immers 34' (o.g.)	Report		Stadium: Euroborg; Attendance: 17,291

30 March 2019 Week 27	AZ Alkmaar	1-0	FC Groningen	Alkmaar
20:45	Ron Vlaar 70'	Report		Stadium: AFAS Stadion; Attendance: 15,404

2 April 2019 Week 28	FC Groningen	1-0	De Graafschap	Groningen
14:30	Paul Gladon 76'	Report		Stadium: Euroborg; Attendance: 18,008

6 April 2019 Week 29	FC Groningen	1-0	Excelsior Rotterdam	Groningen
19:45	Paul Gladon 70'	Report		Stadium: Euroborg; Attendance: 17,456

14 April 2019 Week 30	SC Heerenveen	1-1	FC Groningen	Heerenveen
14:30	Pelle van Amersfoort 38'	Report	Paul Gladon 61'	Stadium: Abe Lenstra Stadion; Attendance: 21,056

20 April 2019 Week 31	FC Groningen	0-1	AFC Ajax	Groningen
18:30		Report	Klaas-Jan Huntelaar 78'	Stadium: Euroborg; Attendance: 22,288

29 April 2019 Week 32	PEC Zwolle	3-2	FC Groningen	Zwolle
20:00	Lennart Thy 47' 81'; Bram van Polen 75'	Report	Kaj Sierhuis 20'; Paul Gladon 75'	Stadium: MAC^{3}PARK Stadion; Attendance: 13,942

12 May 2019 Week 33	FC Groningen	3-0	Fortuna Sittard	Groningen
14:30	Paul Gladon 38'; Ritsu Dōan 53'; Samir Memišević 90+3' (pen.)	Report		Stadium: Euroborg; Attendance: 19,738

15 May 2019 Week 34	FC Emmen	1-0	FC Groningen	Emmen
19:30	Michael Chacón 27'	Report		Stadium: De Oude Meerdijk; Attendance: 8,301

18 May 2019 European competition playoff 1st game	FC Groningen	2-1	SBV Vitesse	Groningen
20:45	Mimoun Mahi 45+1'; Samir Memišević 56' (pen.)	Report	Max Clark 70'	Stadium: Euroborg; Attendance: 16,783

21 May 2019 European competition playoff 2nd game	SBV Vitesse	3-1	FC Groningen	Arnhem
20:45	Tim Matavž 71'; Martin Ødegaard 28' 31'	Report	Kaj Sierhuis 20'	Stadium: GelreDome; Attendance: 9,756

Vitesse won 4–3 on aggregate.

== KNVB Cup ==
27 September 2018 First round	FC Groningen	0-2	FC Twente	Groningen
18:30		Report	Javier Espinosa 45'; Peet Bijen 68'	Stadium: Euroborg; Attendance: 18,192

== Statistics ==
=== Scorers ===
#	Player	Eredivisie	KNVB	Total
1	(Morocco) Mimoun Mahi	8	0	8
2	(Netherlands) Paul Gladon	5	0	5
2	(Japan) Ritsu Dōan	5	0	5
2	(Bosnia and Herzegovina) Samir Memišević	5	0	5
5	(Netherlands) Kaj Sierhuis	4	0	4
6	(Netherlands) Django Warmerdam	2	0	2
6	(Netherlands) Thomas Bruns	2	0	2
8	(Guinea) Ahmad Mendes Moreira	1	0	1
8	(Netherlands) Deyovaisio Zeefuik	1	0	1
8	(Morocco) Iliass Bel Hassani	1	0	1
8	(Denmark) Jannik Pohl	1	0	1
8	(Germany) Jeff Chabot	1	0	1
8	(Netherlands) Ludovit Reis	1	0	1
8	(Colombia) Mateo Cassierra	1	0	1
8	(Netherlands) Michael Breij	1	0	1
8	(Netherlands) Mohamed El Hankouri	1	0	1

=== Appearances ===
#	Player	Eredivisie	KNVB	Total
1	(Netherlands) Sergio Padt	36	1	37
2	(Netherlands) Mike te Wierik	35	1	36
2	(Bosnia and Herzegovina) Samir Memišević	35	1	36
4	(Germany) Tim Handwerker	33	1	34
6	(Japan) Ritsu Dōan	32	1	33
6	(Netherlands) Deyovaisio Zeefuik	32	0	32
6	(Netherlands) Ludovit Reis	31	1	32
8	(Germany) Jeff Chabot	28	1	29
9	(Morocco) Mimoun Mahi	28	0	28
10	(Netherlands) Django Warmerdam	26	1	27
11	(Australia) Ajdin Hrustic	20	1	21
12	(Netherlands) Kaj Sierhuis	19	0	19
12	(Netherlands) Tom van de Looi	18	1	19
14	(Netherlands) Thomas Bruns	18	0	18
15	(Netherlands) Mohamed El Hankouri	17	0	17
16	(Netherlands) Paul Gladon	16	0	16
17	(Morocco) Iliass Bel Hassani	14	0	14
18	(Guinea) Ahmad Mendes Moreira	13	0	13
19	(Colombia) Mateo Cassierra	10	0	10
19	(Netherlands) Michael Breij	9	1	10
19	(Mexico) Uriel Antuna	9	1	10
22	(Denmark) Jannik Pohl	7	1	8
23	(Netherlands) Tim Freriks	6	1	7
24	(Netherlands) Amir Absalem	3	0	3
25	(Netherlands) Jesper Drost	2	0	2
25	(Netherlands) Tom van Weert	2	0	2
27	(Netherlands) Daniël van Kaam	1	0	1

=== Clean sheets ===
#	Player	Eredivisie	Total
1	(Netherlands) Sergio Padt	12	12
Total		12	12

=== Disciplinary record ===
#	Player	Eredivisie		KNVB		Total	
#	Player	Yellow card	Red card	Yellow card	Red card	Yellow card	Red card
1	(Netherlands) Deyovaisio Zeefuik	9	1	0	0	9	1
2	(Australia) Ajdin Hrustic	6	1	0	0	6	1
3	(Japan) Ritsu Dōan	3	1	1	0	4	1
4	(Germany) Jeff Chabot	6	0	0	0	6	0
5	(Netherlands) Ludovit Reis	5	0	0	0	5	0
5	(Netherlands) Mike te Wierik	5	0	0	0	5	0
7	(Netherlands) Thomas Bruns	4	0	0	0	4	0
8	(Germany) Tim Handwerker	3	0	0	0	3	0
9	(Denmark) Jannik Pohl	2	0	0	0	2	0
9	(Morocco) Mimoun Mahi	2	0	0	0	2	0
9	(Bosnia and Herzegovina) Samir Memišević	2	0	0	0	2	0
12	(Guinea) Ahmad Mendes Moreira	1	0	0	0	1	0
12	(Netherlands) Amir Absalem	1	0	0	0	1	0
12	(Netherlands) Django Warmerdam	1	0	0	0	1	0
12	(Netherlands) Kaj Sierhuis	1	0	0	0	1	0
12	(Netherlands) Michael Breij	1	0	0	0	1	0
12	(Netherlands) Mohamed El Hankouri	1	0	0	0	1	0
12	(Netherlands) Paul Gladon	1	0	0	0	1	0
12	(Netherlands) Sergio Padt	1	0	0	0	1	0
