= 2017–18 FC Groningen season =

FC Groningen
2017–18 season
- Head coach: Ernest Faber
- Stadium: Euroborg
- Eredivisie: 12th
- KNVB Cup: 2nd round
- Top goalscorer: League: Tom van Weert (12 goals); All: Tom van Weert (12 goals)
- Highest home attendance: 22,568 (against AFC Ajax)
- Lowest home attendance: 15,382 (against VVV-Venlo)
- Average home league attendance: 18,613
- Biggest win: 4-0 (against Sparta Rotterdam and Excelsior Rotterdam in Eredivisie)
- Biggest defeat: 3-0 (against Feyenoord in Eredivisie)
Home colours

FC Groningen finished 2017–18 Eredivisie season as 12th.

The club competed also in the KNVB Cup. FC Groningen lost 3–1 against Roda JC Kerkrade in the 2nd round and are eliminated from the cup.

Tom van Weert was the top scorer of the club in this season with 12 goals in Eredivisie.

Sergio Padt was the most appeared player in this season with 36 appearances; 34 appearances in Eredivisie and 2 appearances in the KNVB Cup. (2nd consecutive season)

== Players ==
=== First-team squad ===
Note: Flags indicate national team as defined under FIFA eligibility rules; some limited exceptions apply. Players may hold more than one non-FIFA nationality.

No.	Pos.	Nation	Player
1	GK	NED	Sergio Padt
2	DF	NED	Deyovaisio Zeefuik
2	DF	ENG	Todd Kane
3	DF	DEN	Kasper Larsen
4	DF	NED	Mike te Wierik
5	DF	BIH	Samir Memišević
6	MF	NED	Etiënne Reijnen
7	MF	CUW	Juninho Bacuna
8	MF	NOR	Ruben Jenssen
9	FW	RSA	Lars Veldwijk
10	FW	MAR	Mimoun Mahi
11	FW	MAR	Oussama Idrissi
14	FW	MEX	Uriel Antuna
16	GK	BEL	Kevin Begois
17	MF	NED	Jesper Drost
19	FW	NED	Tom van Weert
20	MF	NED	Yoell van Nieff

No.	Pos.	Nation	Player
21	DF	NED	Django Warmerdam
23	MF	AUS	Ajdin Hrustic
25	MF	JPN	Ritsu Dōan
31	GK	NED	Jan Hoekstra
33	GK	NED	Abdel El Ouazzane
36	MF	NED	Tom van de Looi
37	DF	NED	Lars Kramer
39	DF	NED	Amir Absalem
43	FW	NED	Robbert de Vos
47	MF	NED	Michael Breij
48	MF	PNG	David Browne
49	MF	NED	Gerald Postma
50	MF	NED	Tim Freriks
53	DF	NED	Tim Riksman
68	MF	NED	Ludovit Reis
—	FW	NED	Joël Donald

== Transfers ==
=== In ===
Pos.	Player	Transferred from	Fee	Date
DF	(Netherlands) Django Warmerdam	(Netherlands) Young Ajax	Free	1 Jul 2017
GK	(Belgium) Kevin Begois	(Netherlands) PEC Zwolle	Free	1 Jul 2017
DF	(Netherlands) Mike te Wierik	(Netherlands) Heracles Almelo	Free	1 Jul 2017
MF	(Japan) Ritsu Dōan	(Japan) Gamba Osaka	On loan	1 Jul 2017
DF	(England) Todd Kane	(England) Chelsea F.C.	On loan	1 Jul 2017
FW	(Mexico) Uriel Antuna	(England) Manchester City U23	On loan	2 Jul 2017
FW	(South Africa) Lars Veldwijk	(Belgium) K.V. Kortrijk	€375,000	17 Jul 2017
DF	(Netherlands) Deyovaisio Zeefuik	(Netherlands) AFC Ajax	On loan	31 Jan 2018

=== Out ===
Pos.	Player	Transferred to	Fee	Date
DF	(Australia) Jason Davidson	(England) Huddersfield Town A.F.C.	End of loan	30 Jun 2017
FW	(Norway) Alexander Sørloth	(Denmark) FC Midtjylland	€450,000	1 Jul 2017
DF	(United States) Desevio Payne	(Netherlands) Excelsior Rotterdam	Free	1 Jul 2017
GK	(Netherlands) Erwin Heidekamp	(Netherlands) Oranje Nassau Groningen	Free	1 Jul 2017
DF	(Netherlands) Glenn Bijl	(Netherlands) FC Emmen	Free	1 Jul 2017
GK	(Netherlands) Nick Borgman	(Netherlands) VV Hoogeveen	Free	1 Jul 2017
GK	(Netherlands) Stefan van der Lei	(Netherlands) Willem II	Free	1 Jul 2017
MF	(Netherlands) Tom Hiariej	(Australia) Central Coast Mariners FC	Free	1 Jul 2017
FW	(Netherlands) Bryan Linssen	(Netherlands) SBV Vitesse	€1,000,000	3 Jul 2017
MF	(Netherlands) Keziah Veendorp	(Netherlands) FC Emmen	Free	4 Jul 2017
MF	(Netherlands) Hedwiges Maduro	(Cyprus) AC Omonia	Free	20 Jul 2017
MF	(Sweden) Simon Tibbling	(Denmark) Brøndby IF	€700,000	21 Jul 2017
DF	(Netherlands) Martijn Van Der Laan	(Netherlands) SC Cambuur	Free	28 Jul 2017
DF	(Netherlands) Roland Baas	(Netherlands) Heracles Almelo	Free	30 Aug 2017
FW	(Netherlands) Danny Hoesen	(United States) San Jose Earthquakes	€100,000	1 Jan 2018
MF	(Norway) Ruben Jenssen	(Germany) 1. FC Kaiserslautern	On loan	4 Jan 2018
FW	(Netherlands) Oussama Idrissi	(Netherlands) AZ Alkmaar	€2,000,000	17 Jan 2018
DF	(England) Todd Kane	(England) Chelsea F.C.	End of loan	30 Jan 2018
MF	(Netherlands) Etiënne Reijnen	(Israel) Maccabi Haifa F.C.	Free	31 Jan 2018

== Competitions ==
=== Overall record ===
Competition	First match	Last match	Starting round	Final position	Record							
Competition	First match	Last match	Starting round	Final position	Pld	W	D	L	GF	GA	GD	Win %
Eredivisie	13 August 2017	6 May 2018	Week 1	12th	34	8	14	12	50	50	+0	23.53
KNVB	21 September 2017	25 October 2017	1st round	2nd round	2	1	0	1	5	5	+0	50.00
Total					36	9	14	13	55	55	+0	25.00

Source: Competitions

=== Eredivisie ===
==== Results summary ====
Overall								Home						Away					
Pld	W	D	L	GF	GA	GD	Pts	W	D	L	GF	GA	GD	W	D	L	GF	GA	GD
34	8	14	12	50	50	0	38	7	7	3	32	21	+11	1	7	9	18	29	−11

==== Results by round ====
Round	1	2	3	4	5	6	7	8	9	10	11	12	13	14	15	16	17	18	19	20	21	22	23	24	25	26	27	28	29	30	31	32	33	34
Ground	H	A	H	H	A	H	A	H	H	A	A	H	H	A	A	H	A	H	A	H	A	A	H	A	H	A	H	A	H	A	H	A	H	A
Result	D	L	W	D	L	W	L	D	L	L	L	W	L	W	D	D	L	W	D	D	L	L	D	D	D	D	W	L	L	D	W	D	W	D
Position																																		12

A = Away; H = Home; W = Win; D = Draw; L = Loss

==== Matches ====
===== 1st half =====
13 August 2017 Week 1	FC Groningen	3-3	SC Heerenveen	Groningen
16:45	Lars Veldwijk 53'; Mimoun Mahi 82' 88' (pen.)	Report	Morten Thorsby 6' 86'; Reza Ghoochannejhad 40'	Stadium: Euroborg; Attendance: 19,255

20 August 2017 Week 2	AFC Ajax	3-1	FC Groningen	Amsterdam
14:30	Klaas-Jan Huntelaar 38'; Hakim Ziyech 38'; Lasse Schöne 79'	Report	Oussama Idrissi 73'	Stadium: Johan Cruyff Arena; Attendance: 51,152

27 August 2017 Week 3	FC Groningen	2-1	FC Utrecht	Groningen
16:45	Django Warmerdam 8'; Jesper Drost 40'	Report	Jean-Christophe Bahebeck 64'	Stadium: Euroborg; Attendance: 16,032

10 September 2017 Week 4	FC Groningen	1-1	VVV-Venlo	Groningen
16:45	Mimoun Mahi 15'	Report	Kelechi Nwakali 90+1'	Stadium: Euroborg; Attendance: 15,832

16 September 2017 Week 5	NAC Breda	2-1	FC Groningen	Breda
19:45	Rai Vloet 58' 60'	Report	Mimoun Mahi 70'	Stadium: Rat Verlegh Stadion; Attendance: 18,563

24 September 2017 Week 6	FC Groningen	1-0	FC Twente	Groningen
14:30	Oussama Idrissi 51'	Report		Stadium: Euroborg; Attendance: 20,110

30 September 2017 Week 7	PEC Zwolle	3-2	FC Groningen	Zwolle
19:45	Stef Nijland 19'; Ryan Thomas 60'; Youness Mokhtar 90+3'	Report	Ritsu Dōan 15'; Tom van Weert 54'	Stadium: MAC³PARK Stadion; Attendance: 13,160

15 October 2017 Week 8	FC Groningen	1-1	AZ Alkmaar	Groningen
14:30	Mimoun Mahi 70'	Report	Alireza Jahanbakhsh 45+1'	Stadium: Euroborg; Attendance: 17,680

20 October 2017 Week 9	FC Groningen	0-1	Willem II	Groningen
20:00		Report	Fran Sol 33'	Stadium: Euroborg; Attendance: 16,394

29 October 2017 Week 10	Sparta Rotterdam	2-1	FC Groningen	Rotterdam
14:30	Robert Mühren 22'; Loris Brogno 43' (pen.)	Report	Ludovit Reis 36'	Stadium: Het Kasteel; Attendance: 10,010

4 November 2017 Week 11	Heracles Almelo	2-1	FC Groningen	Almelo
19:45	Reuven Niemeijer 14'; Jeff Hardeveld 82' (pen.)	Report	Lars Veldwijk 44' (pen.)	Stadium: Erve Asito; Attendance: 10,411

19 November 2017 Week 12	FC Groningen	4-2	SBV Vitesse	Groningen
14:30	Fankaty Dabo 59' (o.g.); Oussama Idrissi 65'; Mimoun Mahi 78'; Tom van Weert 82'	Report	Kasper Larsen 32' (o.g.); Tim Matavž 62' (pen.)	Stadium: Euroborg; Attendance: 17,263

25 November 2017 Week 13	FC Groningen	0-2	Feyenoord	Groningen
19:45		Report	Tonny Vilhena 49'; Nicolai Jørgensen 59'	Stadium: Euroborg; Attendance: 20,294

2 December 2017 Week 14	ADO Den Haag	0-3	FC Groningen	The Hague
18:30		Report	Ritsu Dōan 45+1'; Oussama Idrissi 74'; Juninho Bacuna 89'	Stadium: Bingoal Stadion; Attendance: 10,416

10 December 2017 Week 15	Roda JC Kerkrade	2-2	FC Groningen	Kerkrade
12:30	Simon Gustafson 14' 34'	Report	Tom van Weert 37' 59' (pen.)	Stadium: Parkstad Limburg Stadion; Attendance: 10,515

13 December 2017 Week 16	FC Groningen	3-3	PSV Eindhoven	Groningen
18:30	Yoell van Nieff 31'; Lars Veldwijk 54' (pen.); Mike te Wierik 90+5'	Report	Marco van Ginkel 7' 37' (pen.); Bart Ramselaar 16'	Stadium: Euroborg; Attendance: 20,103

17 December 2017 Week 17	Excelsior Rotterdam	2–0	FC Groningen	Rotterdam
16:45	Milan Massop 8'; Stanley Elbers 83'	Report		Stadium: Van Donge & De Roo Stadion; Attendance: 3,808

24 December 2017 Week 18	FC Groningen	4-0	Sparta Rotterdam	Groningen
12:30	Lars Veldwijk 49'; Tom van Weert 74'; Frederik Holst 86' (o.g.); Ritsu Dōan 90'	Report		Stadium: Euroborg; Attendance: 17,617

===== 2nd half =====
21 January 2018 Week 19	Willem II	1–1	FC Groningen	Tilburg
14:30	Ismail Azzaoui 71'	Report	Ritsu Dōan 14'	Stadium: Koning Willem II Stadion; Attendance: 12,160

27 January 2018 Week 20	FC Groningen	3-3	Heracles Almelo	Groningen
18:30	Tom van Weert 28'; Jesper Drost 43'; Mimoun Mahi 45'	Report	Jamiro Monteiro 34'; Vincent Vermeij 63'; Robin Pröpper 78'	Stadium: Euroborg; Attendance: 17,526

2 February 2018 Week 21	SBV Vitesse	2-0	FC Groningen	Arnhem
20:00	Matt Miazga 6'; Mason Mount 32'	Report		Stadium: GelreDome; Attendance: 14,675

8 February 2018 Week 22	Feyenoord	3-0	FC Groningen	Rotterdam
20:45	Jens Toornstra 53'; Jerry St. Juste 72'; Robin van Persie 78'	Report		Stadium: De Kuip; Attendance: 37,500

11 February 2018 Week 23	FC Groningen	0-0	ADO Den Haag	Groningen
16:45		Report		Stadium: Euroborg; Attendance: 16,723

16 February 2018 Week 24	VVV-Venlo	1-1	FC Groningen	Venlo
20:00	Vito van Crooij 2'	Report	Ritsu Dōan 15'	Stadium: Covebo Stadion – De Koel; Attendance: 6,624

11 February 2018 Week 25	FC Groningen	1-1	NAC Breda	Groningen
20:00	Pablo Marí 66' (o.g.)	Report	Mitchell te Vrede 86'	Stadium: Euroborg; Attendance: 21,875

4 March 2018 Week 26	FC Twente	1-1	FC Groningen	Enschede
16:45	Tom Boere 71'	Report	Ritsu Dōan 57'	Stadium: De Grolsch Veste; Attendance: 23,900

11 March 2018 Week 27	FC Groningen	2-0	PEC Zwolle	Groningen
12:30	Ryan Thomas 25' (o.g.); Ajdin Hrustic 90'	Report		Stadium: Euroborg; Attendance: 17,896

18 March 2018 Week 28	AZ Alkmaar	3-2	FC Groningen	Alkmaar
12:30	Jonas Svensson 53'; Guus Til 66'; Alireza Jahanbakhsh 90+2'	Report	Tom van Weert 70'; Ritsu Dōan 83'	Stadium: AFAS Stadion; Attendance: 16,459

1 April 2018 Week 29	FC Groningen	1-2	AFC Ajax	Groningen
14:30	Tom van Weert 14'	Report	Justin Kluivert 64'; Klaas-Jan Huntelaar 89'	Stadium: Euroborg; Attendance: 22,568

8 April 2018 Week 30	SC Heerenveen	1-1	FC Groningen	Heerenveen
14:30	Michel Vlap 31'	Report	Tom van Weert 55'	Stadium: Abe Lenstra Stadion; Attendance: 23,150

15 April 2018 Week 31	FC Groningen	2-1	Roda JC Kerkrade	Groningen
14:30	Ritsu Dōan 15'; Jesper Drost 49'	Report	Christian Kum 70'	Stadium: Euroborg; Attendance: 20,402

19 April 2018 Week 32	FC Utrecht	1-1	FC Groningen	Utrecht
18:30	Willem Janssen 8'	Report	Tom van Weert 73' (pen.)	Stadium: Stadion Galgenwaard; Attendance: 19,540

29 April 2018 Week 33	FC Groningen	4-0	Excelsior Rotterdam	Groningen
14:30	Tom van Weert 42' 73'; Samir Memišević 45+1'; Ritsu Dōan 71'	Report		Stadium: Euroborg; Attendance: 18,847

6 May 2018 Week 34	PSV Eindhoven	0-0	FC Groningen	Eindhoven
14:30		Report		Stadium: Philips Stadion; Attendance: 33,700

=== KNVB Cup ===
22 September 2017 First round	USV Hercules	2-4	FC Groningen	Utrecht
18:30	Fouad Belarbi 11'; Leroy Oehlers 86'	Report	Oussama Idrissi 40'; Ritsu Dōan 46'; Juninho Bacuna 65'; Ajdin Hrustic 76'	Stadium: Stadion Galgenwaard; Attendance: 3,000

25 October 2017 Second round	Roda JC Kerkrade	3-1	FC Groningen	Kerkrade
19:45	Tsiy-William Ndenge 44' 69'; Mikhail Rosheuvel 90+2'	Report	Juninho Bacuna 56'	Stadium: Parkstad Limburg Stadion; Attendance: 7,273

== Statistics ==
=== Scorers ===
#	Player	Eredivisie	KNVB	Total
1	(Netherlands) Tom van Weert	12	0	12
2	(Japan) Ritsu Dōan	9	1	10
3	(Morocco) Mimoun Mahi	7	0	7
4	(Morocco) Oussama Idrissi	4	1	5
5	(South Africa) Lars Veldwijk	4	0	4
6	(Netherlands) Jesper Drost	3	0	3
6	(Curaçao) Juninho Bacuna	1	2	3
8	(Australia) Ajdin Hrustic	1	1	2
9	(Netherlands) Django Warmerdam	1	0	1
9	(Netherlands) Ludovit Reis	1	0	1
9	(Netherlands) Mike te Wierik	1	0	1
9	(Bosnia and Herzegovina) Samir Memišević	1	0	1
9	(Netherlands) Yoell van Nieff	1	0	1

=== Appearances ===
#	Player	Eredivisie	KNVB	Total
1	(Netherlands) Sergio Padt	34	2	36
2	(Curaçao) Juninho Bacuna	33	2	35
2	(Netherlands) Mike te Wierik	33	2	35
4	(Netherlands) Tom van Weert	31	2	33
5	(Netherlands) Django Warmerdam	30	2	32
6	(Netherlands) Jesper Drost	30	1	31
6	(Japan) Ritsu Dōan	29	2	31
6	(Bosnia and Herzegovina) Samir Memišević	29	2	31
9	(Morocco) Mimoun Mahi	26	1	27
10	(Netherlands) Yoell van Nieff	21	0	21
11	(Netherlands) Lars Veldwijk	18	2	20
12	(Australia) Ajdin Hrustic	18	1	19
13	(Netherlands) Ludovit Reis	16	2	18
14	(Morocco) Oussama Idrissi	15	1	16
14	(Netherlands) Tom van de Looi	16	0	16
16	(Netherlands) Deyovaisio Zeefuik	13	0	13
16	(Norway) Ruben Jenssen	12	1	13
18	(Denmark) Kasper Larsen	12	0	12
18	(England) Todd Kane	11	1	12
18	(Mexico) Uriel Antuna	11	1	12
21	(Netherlands) Etiënne Reijnen	8	2	10
22	(Netherlands) Amir Absalem	8	1	9
22	(Netherlands) Michael Breij	3	0	3
24	(Netherlands) Lars Kramer	1	0	1
24	(Netherlands) Tim Freriks	1	0	1

=== Clean sheets ===
#	Player	Eredivisie	Total
1	(Netherlands) Sergio Padt	7	7
Total		7	7

=== Disciplinary record ===
#	Player	Eredivisie		KNVB		Total	
#	Player	Yellow card	Red card	Yellow card	Red card	Yellow card	Red card
1	(Australia) Ajdin Hrustic	1	1	1	0	2	1
1	(Netherlands) Ludovit Reis	2	1	0	0	2	1
1	(Netherlands) Tom van Weert	2	1	0	0	2	1
4	(Netherlands) Mike te Wierik	8	0	0	0	8	0
5	(Netherlands) Django Warmerdam	7	0	0	0	7	0
6	(Netherlands) Deyovaisio Zeefuik	6	0	0	0	6	0
6	(Curaçao) Juninho Bacuna	5	0	1	0	6	0
8	(Bosnia and Herzegovina) Samir Memišević	5	0	0	0	5	0
9	(Morocco) Oussama Idrissi	4	0	0	0	4	0
10	(Denmark) Kasper Larsen	3	0	0	0	3	0
10	(Japan) Ritsu Dōan	3	0	0	0	3	0
10	(Netherlands) Yoell van Nieff	3	0	0	0	3	0
13	(England) Todd Kane	2	0	0	0	2	0
14	(Morocco) Mimoun Mahi	1	0	0	0	1	0
14	(Norway) Ruben Jenssen	1	0	0	0	1	0
14	(Netherlands) Sergio Padt	1	0	0	0	1	0
14	(Mexico) Uriel Antuna	1	0	0	0	1	0
