= 2019–20 FC Groningen season =

Groningen
2019–20 season
- Chairman: Bert Middel
- Manager: Danny Buijs
- Stadium: Euroborg
- Eredivisie: 9th
- KNVB Cup: Second round
Home colours	Away colours	Third colours

The 2019–20 Eredivisie was suspended on 12 March 2020 due to the COVID-19 pandemic in the Netherlands and was abandoned on 24 April 2020.

FC Groningen finished 2019–20 Eredivisie season as 9th.

The club competed also in the KNVB Cup. FC Groningen lost 1–0 against FC Twente in the 2nd round and are eliminated from the cup. Feyenoord and FC Utrecht were finalists but the KNVB Cup was also abandoned due to the COVID-19 pandemic in the Netherlands and the final game is not played.

Kaj Sierhuis was the top scorer of the club in this season with 6 goals in Eredivisie.

Deyovaisio Zeefuik was the most appeared player in this season with 28 appearances; 26 appearances in Eredivisie and 2 appearances in the KNVB Cup.

== Players ==
=== First-team squad ===
As of 28 February 2020

Note: Flags indicate national team as defined under FIFA eligibility rules; some limited exceptions apply. Players may hold more than one non-FIFA nationality.

No.	Pos.	Nation	Player
1	GK	NED	Sergio Padt
3	DF	NED	Bart van Hintum
4	DF	NED	Mike te Wierik (captain)
6	MF	NED	Azor Matusiwa
8	MF	GER	Sam Schreck
9	FW	NED	Daishawn Redan (on loan from Hertha BSC)
10	MF	SWE	Ramon Pascal Lundqvist
11	FW	SWE	Joel Asoro (on loan from Swansea City)
14	FW	MAR	Mohamed El Hankouri
15	FW	SWE	Gabriel Gudmundsson
16	GK	NED	Jan Hoekstra
17	DF	JPN	Ko Itakura (on loan from Manchester City)
18	MF	MAR	Ahmed El Messaoudi
19	MF	DEN	Nicklas Strunck
21	DF	NED	Django Warmerdam

No.	Pos.	Nation	Player
22	DF	TUR	Görkem Can
23	MF	AUS	Ajdin Hrustic
26	MF	NED	Daniël van Kaam
27	FW	NED	Thijs Dallinga
28	DF	NED	Tapmahoe Sopacua
29	FW	NED	Romano Postema
32	GK	NED	Marco van Duin
36	GK	NED	Jan de Boer
42	DF	NED	Deyovaisio Zeefuik
43	FW	NED	Joel van Kaam
46	DF	NED	Thomas Poll
51	FW	NED	Kian Slor
52	FW	SVK	Tomáš Suslov
53	FW	NED	Giovanni Zwikstra

=== Out on loan ===
Note: Flags indicate national team as defined under FIFA eligibility rules; some limited exceptions apply. Players may hold more than one non-FIFA nationality.

No.	Pos.	Nation	Player
20	DF	MAR	Amir Absalem (at Almere City until 30 June 2020)
36	MF	NED	Tom van de Looi (at NEC until 30 June 2020)

== Player transfers ==
=== Players In ===
Date	Position	Player	From	Type	Fee	Ref.
1 Jul 2019	DF	(Netherlands) Azor Matusiwa	(Netherlands) Ajax AFC	Transfer	Free	
1 Jul 2019	MF	(Sweden) Gabriel Gudmundsson	(Sweden) Halmstads BK	Transfer	Undisclosed	
1 Jul 2019	MF	(Sweden) Ramon Pascal Lundqvist	(Netherlands) NAC Breda	Transfer	Undisclosed	
1 Jul 2019	MF	(Germany) Sam Schreck	(Germany) Bayer Leverkusen	Transfer	Undisclosed	
5 Jul 2019	GK	(Netherlands) Marco van Duin	(Netherlands) NEC	Transfer	Free	
6 Jul 2019	DF	(Netherlands) Bart van Hintum	(Netherlands) Heracles Almelo	Transfer	Free	
9 Jul 2019	FW	(Curaçao) Charlison Benschop	(Germany) FC Ingolstadt	Transfer	Free	
11 Aug 2019	MF	(Denmark) Nicklas Strunck	(Denmark) FC Nordsjælland	Transfer	Undisclosed	
15 Aug 2019	DF	(Morocco) Ahmed El Messaoudi	(Belgium) K.V. Mechelen	Transfer	Undisclosed	
15 Aug 2019	FW	(Sweden) Joel Asoro	(England) Swansea City A.F.C.	Loan	Undisclosed	
25 Jan 2020	DF	(Turkey) Görkem Can	(Germany) FC Schalke 04 II	Transfer	Undisclosed	
31 Jan 2020	FW	(Netherlands) Daishawn Redan	(Germany) Hertha BSC	Loan	Undisclosed	

=== Players Out ===
Date	Position	Player	To	Type	Fee	Ref.
1 July 2019	DF	(Netherlands) Ludovit Reis	(Spain) FC Barcelona	Transfer	Undisclosed	
1 July 2019	FW	(Morocco) Mimoun Mahi	(Switzerland) FC Zurich	Transfer	Free	
1 July 2019	MF	(Netherlands) Gerald Postma	(Netherlands) Harkemase Boys	Transfer	Free	
1 July 2019	DF	(Netherlands) Lars Kramer	(Denmark) Viborg FF	Transfer	Undisclosed	
1 July 2019	DF	(Germany) Jeff Chabot	(Italy) Sampdoria	Transfer	€3.7M	
1 July 2019	MF	(Netherlands) Daniel Bouman	(Netherlands) SC Cambuur	Transfer	Free	
1 July 2019	MF	(Netherlands) Matthijs Hardijk	(Netherlands) ACV Assen	Transfer	Free	
1 July 2019	DF	(Netherlands) Kellian van der Kaap	(Netherlands) SC Cambuur	Transfer	Free	
1 July 2019	DF	(Netherlands) Marijn Ploem	(Netherlands) HVV Hollandia	Transfer	Free	
1 July 2019	GK	(Netherlands) Pelle Boevink	(Germany) SSV Jeddeloh	Transfer	Free	
1 July 2019	FW	(Netherlands) Paul Gladon	Released	Transfer	Free	
1 July 2019	DF	(Netherlands) Tim Riksman	Released	Transfer	Free	
1 July 2019	GK	(Belgium) Kevin Begois	N/A	Retired	N/A	

== Competitions ==
=== Overall record ===
Competition	First match	Last match	Starting round	Final position	Record							
Competition	First match	Last match	Starting round	Final position	Pld	W	D	L	GF	GA	GD	Win %
Eredivisie	3 August 2019	8 March 2020	Week 1	9th	26	10	5	11	27	26	+1	38.46
KNVB	30 October 2019	19 December 2019	1st round	2nd round	2	1	0	1	2	2	+0	50.00
Total					28	11	5	12	29	28	+1	39.29

Source: Competitions

== Eredivisie ==
=== Results summary ===
Overall								Home						Away					
Pld	W	D	L	GF	GA	GD	Pts	W	D	L	GF	GA	GD	W	D	L	GF	GA	GD
26	10	5	11	27	26	+1	35	7	1	5	17	10	+7	3	4	6	10	16	−6

=== Results by round ===
Round	1	2	3	4	5	6	7	8	9	10	11	12	13	14	15	16	17	18	19	20	21	22	23	24	25	26
Ground	A	H	A	H	A	H	A	A	H	H	A	H	A	H	A	H	A	H	A	H	A	H	A	H	A	H
Result	W	L	D	L	L	W	L	L	W	W	D	W	W	D	L	L	D	W	D	W	L	W	W	L	L	L
Position																										8

A = Away; H = Home; W = Win; D = Draw; L = Loss

=== Matches ===
==== 1st half ====
3 August 2019 Week 1	FC Emmen	0-1	FC Groningen	Emmen
18:30		Report	Ajdin Hrustic 87'	Stadium: De Oude Meerdijk; Attendance: 8,245

10 August 2019 Week 2	FC Groningen	1-3	FC Twente	Groningen
18:30	Ritsu Dōan 84'	Report	Keito Nakamura 55'; Aitor Cantalapiedra 70' (pen.); Haris Vučkić 90+6'	Stadium: Euroborg; Attendance: 19,049

18 August 2019 Week 3	AZ Alkmaar	0-0	FC Groningen	The Hague
20:45		Report		Stadium: Bingoal Stadion; Attendance: 8,563

31 August 2019 Week 4	FC Groningen	1-2	Heracles Almelo	Groningen
19:45	Django Warmerdam 47'	Report	Silvester van der Water 29'; Lennart Czyborra 62'	Stadium: Euroborg; Attendance: 15,934

14 September 2019 Week 5	VVV-Venlo	2-1	FC Groningen	Venlo
19:45	John Yeboah 12'; Evert Linthorst 84'	Report	Ajdin Hrustic 44'	Stadium: Covebo Stadion – De Koel; Attendance: 6,265

21 September 2019 Week 6	FC Groningen	2-0	PEC Zwolle	Groningen
19:45	Ramon Pascal Lundqvist 19'; Ajdin Hrustic 59'	Report		Stadium: Euroborg; Attendance: 16,471

25 September 2019 Week 7	PSV Eindhoven	3-1	FC Groningen	Eindhoven
18:30	Pablo Rosario 12'; Denzel Dumfries 38'; Bruma 90+2'	Report	Ramon Pascal Lundqvist 70'	Stadium: Philips Stadion; Attendance: 32,800

28 September 2019 Week 8	AFC Ajax	2-0	FC Groningen	Amsterdam
19:45	Lisandro Martínez 76'; Klaas-Jan Huntelaar 79'	Report		Stadium: Johan Cruyff Arena; Attendance: 53,228

4 October 2019 Week 9	FC Groningen	3-0	RKC Waalwijk	Groningen
19:45	Mike te Wierik 21'; Charlison Benschop 38'; Gabriel Gudmundsson 78'	Report		Stadium: Euroborg; Attendance: 16,029

20 October 2019 Week 10	FC Groningen	2-0	Sparta Rotterdam	Groningen
14:30	Kaj Sierhuis 85'; Charlison Benschop 90+4'	Report		Stadium: Euroborg; Attendance: 17,582

27 October 2019 Week 11	SC Heerenveen	1-1	FC Groningen	Heerenveen
12:15	Hicham Faik 45+3' (pen.)	Report	Charlison Benschop 73' (pen.)	Stadium: Abe Lenstra Stadion; Attendance: 22,428

3 November 2019 Week 12	FC Groningen	2-0	Willem II	Groningen
14:30	Kaj Sierhuis 40' 47'	Report		Stadium: Euroborg; Attendance: 16,590

8 November 2019 Week 13	SBV Vitesse	1-2	FC Groningen	Arnhem
20:00	Bryan Linssen 49'	Report	Joel Asoro 13' 31'	Stadium: GelreDome; Attendance: 12,590

24 November 2019 Week 14	FC Groningen	1-1	Feyenoord	Groningen
12:15	Samir Memišević 60' (pen.)	Report	Luis Sinisterra 32'	Stadium: Euroborg; Attendance: 21,096

30 November 2019 Week 15	Fortuna Sittard	1-0	FC Groningen	Sittard
19:45	Rasmus Karjalainen 78'	Report		Stadium: Fortuna Sittard Stadion; Attendance: 7,632

8 December 2019 Week 16	FC Groningen	0-1	FC Utrecht	Groningen
14:30		Report	Bart Ramselaar 81'	Stadium: Euroborg; Attendance: 18,741

14 December 2019 Week 17	ADO Den Haag	1-1	FC Groningen	The Hague
18:30	Tomáš Necid 42'	Report	Gabriel Gudmundsson 20'	Stadium: Bingoal Stadion; Attendance: 11,049

22 December 2019 Week 18	FC Groningen	2-0	FC Emmen	Groningen
14:30	Kaj Sierhuis 47' 72'	Report		Stadium: Euroborg; Attendance: 20,136

==== 2nd half ====
18 January 2020 Week 19	FC Twente	0-0	FC Groningen	Enschede
19:45		Report		Stadium: De Grolsch Veste; Attendance: 26,500

26 January 2020 Week 20	FC Groningen	2-1	AFC Ajax	Groningen
14:30	Kaj Sierhuis 16'; Ramon Pascal Lundqvist 52'	Report	Donny van de Beek 72'	Stadium: Euroborg; Attendance: 22,315

1 February 2020 Week 21	PEC Zwolle	1-0	FC Groningen	Zwolle
20:45	Yūta Nakayama 43'	Report		Stadium: MAC³PARK Stadion; Attendance: 12,844

8 February 2020 Week 22	FC Groningen	1-0	SBV Vitesse	Groningen
18:30	Ramon Pascal Lundqvist 13' (pen.)	Report		Stadium: Euroborg; Attendance: 17,884

16 February 2020 Week 23	Sparta Rotterdam	1-2	FC Groningen	Rotterdam
14:30	Mohamed Rayhi (49}pen.)	Report	Joel Asoro 22'; Ramon Pascal Lundqvist 32'	Stadium: Het Kasteel; Attendance: 10,143

22 February 2020 Week 24	FC Groningen	0-1	VVV-Venlo	Groningen
20:45		Report	Oussama Darfalou 87'	Stadium: Euroborg; Attendance: 16,734

28 February 2020 Week 25	Willem II	3-1	FC Groningen	Tilburg
20:00	Ché Nunnely 27'; Vangelis Pavlidis 40'; Mats Köhlert 64'	Report	Ahmed El Messaoudi 74'	Stadium: Koning Willem II Stadion; Attendance: 13,607

8 March 2020 Week 26	FC Groningen	0-1	PSV Eindhoven	Groningen
16:45		Report	Denzel Dumfries 16'	Stadium: Euroborg; Attendance: 19,116

== Standings ==
Pos	Team	Pld	W	D	L	GF	GA	GD	Pts	Qualification or relegation
1	Ajax	25	18	2	5	68	23	+45	56	Qualification to Champions League play-off round
2	AZ	25	18	2	5	54	17	+37	56	Qualification to Champions League second qualifying round
3	Feyenoord	25	14	8	3	50	35	+15	50	Qualification to Europa League third qualifying round
4	PSV Eindhoven	26	14	7	5	54	28	+26	49	Qualification to European competition play-offs (Note: Four teams play for a spot in the 2020–21 UEFA Europa League second qualifying round.)
5	Willem II	26	13	5	8	37	34	+3	44	Qualification to European competition play-offs
6	Utrecht	25	12	5	8	50	34	+16	41	Qualification to European competition play-offs
7	Vitesse	26	12	5	9	45	35	+10	41	Qualification to European competition play-offs
8	Heracles Almelo	26	10	6	10	40	34	+6	36	
9	Groningen	26	10	5	11	27	26	+1	35	
10	Heerenveen	26	8	9	9	41	41	0	33	
11	Sparta Rotterdam	26	9	6	11	41	45	−4	33	
12	Emmen	26	9	5	12	32	45	−13	32	
13	VVV-Venlo	26	8	4	14	24	51	−27	28	
14	Twente	26	7	6	13	34	46	−12	27	
15	PEC Zwolle	26	7	5	14	37	55	−18	26	
16	Fortuna Sittard	26	6	8	12	29	52	−23	26	Qualification to Relegation play-offs (Note: Seven teams, one from the Eredivisie and six from the Eerste Divisie, play for one spot in the 2020–21 Eredivisie. The remaining teams play in the 2020–21 Eerste Divisie.)
17	ADO Den Haag	26	4	7	15	25	54	−29	19	Relegation to Eerste Divisie
18	RKC Waalwijk	26	4	3	19	27	60	−33	15	Relegation to Eerste Divisie

Updated to match(es) played on 8 March 2020. Source: eredivisie.nl
Rules for classification: Season in progress: 1) Most points won; 2) Less points lost; 3) Goal difference; 4) Goals scored; 5) Alphabetical order; End of season: 1) Points; 2) Goal difference; 3) Goals scored; 4) Head-to-head points; 5) Head-to-head goal difference; 6) Head-to-head away goals scored; 7) Play-off if relevant for deciding champion, relegation or participating in a European league, otherwise by draw. 8) Penalty shoot-out (only after a play-off)

== KNVB Cup ==
30 October 2019 First round	Harkemase Boys	1-2	FC Groningen	Harkema
19:45	Robert Stelpstra 49'	Report	Samir Memišević 36' (pen.) 47'	Stadium: De Bosk; Attendance: 4,000; Referee: Sander van der Eijk

19 December 2019 Second round	FC Groningen	0-1	FC Utrecht	Groningen
18:30		Report	Abass Issah 68'	Stadium: Hitachi Capital Mobility Stadion; Attendance: 14,548; Referee: Pol van Boekel

== Statistics ==
=== Scorers ===
#	Player	Eredivisie	KNVB	Total
1	(Netherlands) Kaj Sierhuis	6	0	6
2	(Sweden) Ramon Pascal Lundqvist	5	0	5
3	(Australia) Ajdin Hrustic	3	0	3
3	(Curaçao) Charlison Benschop	3	0	3
3	(Sweden) Joel Asoro	3	0	3
3	(Bosnia and Herzegovina) Samir Memišević	1	2	3
7	(Sweden) Gabriel Gudmundsson	2	0	2
8	(Morocco) Ahmed El Messaoudi	1	0	1
8	(Netherlands) Django Warmerdam	1	0	1
8	(Netherlands) Mike te Wierik	1	0	1
8	(Japan) Ritsu Dōan	1	0	1

=== Appearances ===
#	Player	Eredivisie	KNVB	Total
1	(Netherlands) Deyovaisio Zeefuik	26	2	28
2	(Australia) Ajdin Hrustic	25	2	27
2	(Netherlands) Sergio Padt	26	1	27
4	(Netherlands) Azor Matusiwa	23	1	24
4	(Netherlands) Mike te Wierik	23	1	24
6	(Japan) Ko Itakura	22	1	23
6	(Netherlands) Mohamed El Hankouri	21	2	23
8	(Morocco) Ahmed El Messaoudi	20	2	22
8	(Netherlands) Django Warmerdam	21	1	22
10	(Sweden) Ramon Pascal Lundqvist	20	1	21
11	(Curaçao) Charlison Benschop	17	1	18
12	(Sweden) Joel Asoro	15	1	16
13	(Netherlands) Bart van Hintum	14	1	15
14	(Netherlands) Daniël van Kaam	11	2	13
14	(Netherlands) Kaj Sierhuis	11	2	13
14	(Germany) Sam Schreck	13	0	13
14	(Bosnia and Herzegovina) Samir Memišević	11	2	13
18	(Netherlands) Romano Postema	11	1	12
19	(Sweden) Gabriel Gudmundsson	11	0	11
20	(Netherlands) Amir Absalem	5	1	6
21	(Netherlands) Daishawn Redan	5	0	5
21	(Netherlands) Kaj Sierhuis	5	0	5
23	(Japan) Ritsu Dōan	2	0	2
23	(Netherlands) Thomas Poll	2	0	2
25	(Netherlands) Jan Hoekstra	1	0	1
25	(Netherlands) Kian Slor	1	0	1
25	(Slovakia) Tomáš Suslov	1	0	1

=== Clean sheets ===
#	Player	Eredivisie	Total
1	(Netherlands) Sergio Padt	9	9
Total		9	9

=== Disciplinary record ===
#	Player	Eredivisie		KNVB		Total	
#	Player	Yellow card	Red card	Yellow card	Red card	Yellow card	Red card
1	(Netherlands) Mike te Wierik	5	1	1	0	6	1
2	(Sweden) Ramon Pascal Lundqvist	3	1	0	0	3	1
3	(Netherlands) Deyovaisio Zeefuik	2	1	0	0	2	1
4	(Netherlands) Django Warmerdam	0	1	0	0	0	1
5	(Netherlands) Azor Matusiwa	4	0	0	0	4	0
5	(Japan) Ko Itakura	4	0	0	0	4	0
5	(Bosnia and Herzegovina) Samir Memišević	4	0	0	0	4	0
8	(Australia) Ajdin Hrustic	3	0	0	0	3	0
8	(Netherlands) Amir Absalem	2	0	1	0	3	0
8	(Netherlands) Bart van Hintum	3	0	0	0	3	0
8	(Curaçao) Charlison Benschop	3	0	0	0	3	0
12	(Morocco) Ahmed El Messaoudi	2	0	0	0	2	0
12	(Sweden) Gabriel Gudmundsson	2	0	0	0	2	0
12	(Netherlands) Mohamed El Hankouri	2	0	0	0	2	0
12	(Germany) Sam Schreck	2	0	0	0	2	0
16	(Sweden) Joel Asoro	1	0	0	0	1	0
16	(Netherlands) Kaj Sierhuis	0	0	1	0	1	0
16	(Netherlands) Romano Postema	1	0	0	0	1	0
16	(Netherlands) Thomas Poll	1	0	0	0	1	0
