= Michael Breij =

Dutch footballer (born 1997)

Personal information
- Date of birth: 15 January 1997 (age 29)
- Place of birth: Amstelveen, Netherlands
- Height: 1.78 m (5 ft 10 in)
- Positions: Attacking midfielder; right winger

Team information
- Current team: Emmen
- Number: 22

Youth career
- –2008: RKAVIC
- 2007–2008: SV Ouderkerk
- 2008–2009: AFC
- 2009–2016: AZ

Senior career*
Years	Team	Apps	(Gls)
2016–2019	Jong Groningen	61	(29)
2018–2019	Groningen	12	(1)
2020–2024	Cambuur	125	(23)
2024–2025	Sepsi OSK	6	(0)
2025–2026	Roda JC	53	(15)
2026–	Emmen	0	(0)

International career
2013	Netherlands U16	1	(0)
2015	Netherlands U18	2	(0)
- * Club domestic league appearances and goals as of 25 April 2026

Michael Breij (born 15 January 1997) is a Dutch professional footballer who plays as an attacking midfielder or right winger for Eerste Divisie club Emmen.

== Club career ==
=== Early years ===
Breij was born in Amstelveen and played football for amateur club RKAVIC in his youth. After a year at SV Ouderkerk and one at AFC, he moved to AZ in 2009. He spent seven years in the youth academy of the Alkmaar club before joining Groningen's under-23s in the summer of 2016.

=== Groningen ===
Between 2016 and 2019, Breij became a key player for the under-23 team, captaining the squad and scoring 21 goals in 30 appearances during the 2017–18 Derde Divisie season.

Breij made his professional debut for Groningen on 19 April 2018, in a 1–1 Eredivisie draw against Utrecht, coming on in the 73rd minute as a substitute for Jesper Drost.

On 14 May 2018, Breij signed a one-year contract with Groningen with an option for an additional season. He scored his first professional goal on 25 August, helping his team to a 1–0 league victory against De Graafschap.

=== Cambuur ===
On 20 December 2019, it was announced that Breij had signed with Cambuur until the summer of 2021. He made his debut on 17 January 2020 in a 3–2 loss to TOP Oss, coming on as a substitute in the 72nd minute for Mitchell Paulissen. On 21 February, he scored his first goal for the club in a 2–0 home win over Roda JC Kerkrade.

In his second season at the club, Breij was part of the Cambuur team winning the Eerste Divisie title, scoring seven goals in 30 appearances. He also scored his first brace that season, adding an assist, helping Cambuur to a 3–0 away win over Volendam on 2 April 2021.

On 4 February 2022, Breij signed a contract extension, keeping him at Cambuur until 2024 with an option for an additional season.

Breij left Cambuur at the end of the 2023–24 season after five seasons in which he made 134 total competitive appearances, scoring 25 goals.

=== Sepsi OSK ===
On 27 June 2024, Breij signed a two-year contract with Romanian club Sepsi OSK in the Liga I, with an option to extend.

=== Roda ===
On 13 January 2025, Breij joined Roda JC on a one-and-a-half-year contract.

== International career ==
Breij played for Netherlands youth teams, representing his country at under-16 and under-18 level.

== Career statistics ==
As of match played 17 December 2024

Appearances and goals by club, season and competition
Club	Season	League			National cup (Note: Includes KNVB Cup, Cupa României)		Other		Total	
Club	Season	Division	Apps	Goals	Apps	Goals	Apps	Goals	Apps	Goals
Jong Groningen	2016–17	Derde Divisie	22	4	—		—		22	4
Jong Groningen	2017–18	Derde Divisie	30	20	—		—		30	20
Jong Groningen	2018–19	Derde Divisie	9	5	—		—		9	5
Jong Groningen	Total		61	29	—		—		61	29
Groningen	2017–18	Eredivisie	3	0	0	0	—		3	0
Groningen	2018–19	Eredivisie	9	1	1	0	—		10	1
Groningen	Total		12	1	1	0	—		13	1
Cambuur	2019–20	Eerste Divisie	8	3	—		—		8	3
Cambuur	2020–21	Eerste Divisie	29	7	1	0	—		30	7
Cambuur	2021–22	Eredivisie	27	2	1	0	—		28	2
Cambuur	2022–23	Eredivisie	32	2	2	0	—		34	2
Cambuur	2023–24	Eerste Divisie	29	9	5	2	—		34	11
Cambuur	Total		125	23	9	2	—		134	25
Sepsi OSK	2024–25	Liga I	6	0	3	0	—		9	0
Career total			204	53	13	2	0	0	217	55

== Honours ==
Cambuur

- Eerste Divisie: 2020–21
