= Kaj Sierhuis =

Dutch footballer (born 1998)

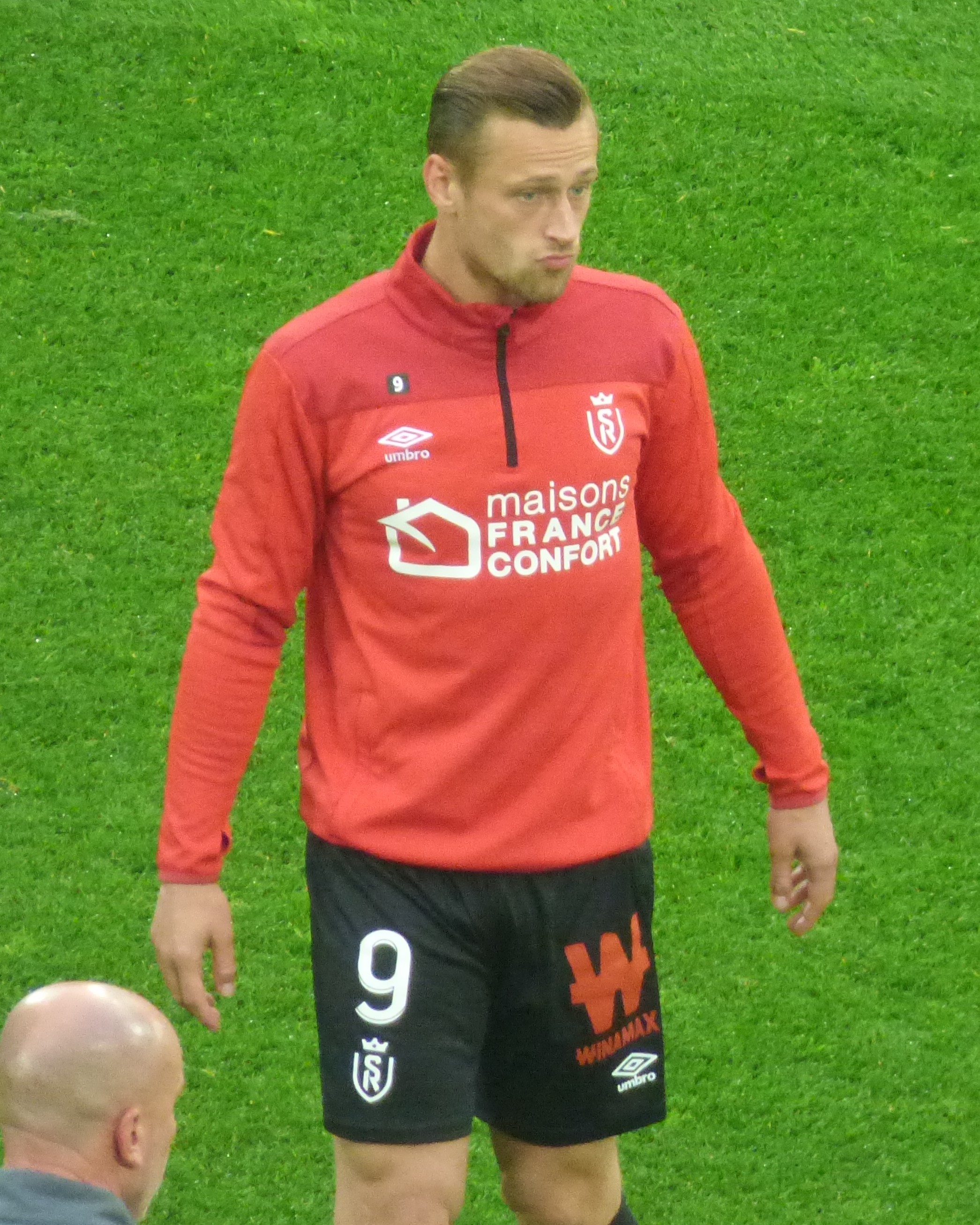
- Sierhuis in 2023

Personal information
- Date of birth: 27 April 1998 (age 28)
- Place of birth: Athens, Greece
- Height: 1.80 m (5 ft 11 in)
- Position: Forward

Team information
- Current team: NEC
- Number: 9

Youth career
- 2003–2009: WSV '30
- 2009–2018: Ajax

Senior career*
Years	Team	Apps	(Gls)
2016–2020	Jong Ajax	41	(22)
2018–2019	Ajax	2	(0)
2018–2019	→ Groningen (loan)	33	(9)
2020–2023	Reims	41	(0)
2021–2022	→ Heracles Almelo (loan)	18	(4)
2023	Reims II	1	(0)
2023–2026	Fortuna Sittard	72	(25)
2026–	NEC	6	(2)

International career
2013–2014	Netherlands U16	3	(2)
2015–2016	Netherlands U18	1	(0)
2016–2017	Netherlands U19	10	(4)
2017–2018	Netherlands U20	8	(2)
2018–2021	Netherlands U21	13	(9)
- * Club domestic league appearances and goals as of 25 October 2026

Kaj Sierhuis (born 27 April 1998) is a Dutch professional footballer who plays as a forward for Eredivisie club NEC. Born in Greece, he is a former youth international for the Netherlands.

== Club career ==
=== Ajax ===
Sierhuis was born in Athens, Greece, on 27 April 1998, when his father, Cock Sierhuis, was president of AEK Athens. The family returned to the Netherlands when Kaj was four years old, and he grew up in Jisp, North Holland.

He had started playing football with WSV '30 in Wormer in the province of North Holland as a five-year-old before moving the to Ajax Youth Academy at age 11. In August 2016, he signed his first professional contract and made his first appearances for Jong Ajax on 25 November 2016 in an Eerste Divisie match against Telstar. That season he also continued to play for the under-19 team in the league and in the UEFA Youth League. In the 2016–17 season, he was top goalscorer in the UEFA Youth League alongside Jordi Mboula of Barcelona. In the 2017–18 season, Sierhuis, who had outgrown the youth teams, was not always part of the regular lineup, but scored 14 goals in 20 appearances and became second-tier Eerste Divisie champion with Ajax's second team, which could however not win promotion due to Dutch league rules. Sierhuis made his first competitive appearance for the Ajax first team on 25 July 2018 in a 2–0 win in the UEFA Champions League second qualifying round against Sturm Graz.

After making just two appearances in the Eredivisie, Sierhuis agreed to a loan move to Groningen until the end of the season with an option to buy. He quickly earned a starting place as Groningen qualified for play-offs for a place in the UEFA Europa League third qualifying round. There, the Groningen side was eliminated in the first round by Vitesse.

=== Reims ===
On 1 February 2020, Sierhuis signed with Ligue 1 club Reims on a long-term contract. He made his debut for the club on 5 February 2020, starting in a league game against Nice, but had to be replaced by Nathanaël Mbuku in the 13th minute after falling out with a hamstring injury. Due to the COVID-19 pandemic, this remained Sierhuis' only appearance for Reims in the 2019–20 season.

In the 2020–21 season, he made regular appearances for Reims, but his playing time decreased from the beginning of 2021 and he was sent on a one-season loan to Eredivisie club Heracles Almelo in August 2021. After 19 total appearances in which he scored one goal, he tore his anterior cruciate ligament on 11 February 2022 against Utrecht and was sidelined for the rest of the season.

He rejoined the Reims squad for the 2022–23 season.

=== Fortuna Sittard ===
On 2 August 2023, Sierhuis returned to the Netherlands and signed a three-year contract with Eredivisie club Fortuna Sittard. He made his debut for the club on 19 August, replacing Paul Gladon in the 83rd minute of a 2–1 victory against Almere City. On 21 October, he scored his first goal for Fortuna, converting a penalty in injury time during a 3–1 defeat against PSV. He secured his first brace for the club on 2 December, contributing to Fortuna's 3–1 triumph over Vitesse, as both assists were provided by Ivo Pinto. Sierhuis scored 15 goals in 35 appearances during his debut season with the club. However, on 3 May 2024, during a match against Go Ahead Eagles, he sustained a serious knee injury that sidelined him for an extended period.

=== NEC ===
On 22 June 2026, Sierhuis moved to NEC and signed a three-season contract.

== Career statistics ==
As of match played 25 October 2026

Appearances and goals by club, season and competition
Club	Season	League			Cup		Europe		Other		Total	
Club	Season	Division	Apps	Goals	Apps	Goals	Apps	Goals	Apps	Goals	Apps	Goals
Jong Ajax	2016–17	Eerste Divisie	8	4	—		—		—		8	4
Jong Ajax	2017–18	Eerste Divisie	20	14	—		—		—		20	14
Jong Ajax	2018–19	Eerste Divisie	13	4	—		—		—		13	4
Jong Ajax	Total		41	22	—		—		—		41	22
Ajax	2018–19	Eredivisie	2	0	0	0	1 (Note: Appearance(s) in UEFA Champions League)	0	—		3	0
Ajax	2019–20	Eredivisie	0	0	0	0	0	0	—		0	0
Ajax	Total		2	0	0	0	1	0	—		3	0
Groningen (loan)	2018–19	Eredivisie	17	3	0	0	—		2 (Note: Appearances in Eredivisie play-offs)	1	19	4
Groningen (loan)	2019–20	Eredivisie	16	6	2	0	—		—		18	6
Groningen (loan)	Total		33	9	2	0	—		2	1	37	10
Reims	2019–20	Ligue 1	1	0	0	0	—		—		1	0
Reims	2020–21	Ligue 1	24	0	1	1	2 (Note: Appearances in UEFA Europa League)	0	—		27	1
Reims	2021–22	Ligue 1	2	0	—		—		—		2	0
Reims	2022–23	Ligue 1	14	0	3	2	—		—		17	2
Reims	Total		41	0	4	3	2	0	—		47	3
Heracles Almelo (loan)	2021–22	Eredivisie	18	4	1	0	—		—		19	4
Reims II	2022–23	National 2	1	0	—		—		—		1	0
Fortuna Sittard	2023–24	Eredivisie	31	12	4	3	—		—		35	15
Fortuna Sittard	2024–25	Eredivisie	11	1	—		—		—		11	1
Fortuna Sittard	2025–26	Eredivisie	30	12	2	1	—		—		32	13
Fortuna Sittard	Total		72	25	6	4	—		—		78	29
NEC	2026–27	Eredivisie	6	2	0	0	4 (Note: Three appearances in UEFA Champions League, one appearance in UEFA Europa League)	0	—		10	2
Career total			214	62	13	7	7	0	2	1	236	70

== Honours ==
Jong Ajax

- Eerste Divisie: 2017–18
