= Samir Memišević =

Bosnian footballer (born 1993)

Personal information
- Date of birth: 13 August 1993 (age 33)
- Place of birth: Tuzla, Bosnia and Herzegovina
- Height: 1.86 m (6 ft 1 in)
- Position: Centre-back

Team information
- Current team: Qingdao West Coast
- Number: 5

Youth career
- Slaven Živinice

Senior career*
Years	Team	Apps	(Gls)
2011–2012	Slaven Živinice		
2012–2013	Sloboda Tuzla	10	(1)
2013	Teleoptik	9	(1)
2013–2014	Bežanija	1	(0)
2014	Teleoptik	3	(0)
2014–2016	Radnik Bijeljina	50	(3)
2016–2020	Groningen	98	(6)
2020–2022	Hebei FC	32	(1)
2022	→ Beijing Guoan (loan)	28	(4)
2023–2025	Al-Nasr	57	(4)
2026–	Qingdao West Coast	27	(3)

International career
2016–2019	Bosnia and Herzegovina	3	(0)
- * Club domestic league appearances and goals as of 19 November 2026

Samir Memišević (pronounced [sâːmir memîːʃeʋitɕ]; born 13 August 1993) is a Bosnian professional footballer who plays as a centre-back for Chinese Super League club Qingdao West Coast.

Memišević started his professional career at Slaven Živinice, before joining Sloboda Tuzla in 2012. The following year, he moved to Teleoptik. Later that year, he switched to Bežanija. A year later, he went back to Teleoptik. Memišević signed with Radnik Bijeljina in 2014. Two years later, he was transferred to Groningen. In 2020, he joined Hebei China Fortune, who loaned him to Beijing Guoan in 2022. He moved to Al-Nasr in 2023. Three years later, he switched to Qingdao West Coast.

Memišević made his senior international debut for Bosnia and Herzegovina in 2016, earning 3 caps until 2019.

== Club career ==
=== Early career ===
Memišević came through Slaven Živinice's youth setup. He made his professional debut in 2011 at the age of 17.

In the summer of 2012, he joined Sloboda Tuzla. On 28 October, he scored his first professional goal in a triumph over Iskra Bugojno.

In March 2013, Memišević moved to Serbian team Teleoptik, which serves as Partizan's feeder squad. In July, he switched to Bežanija. In January 2014, he returned to Teleoptik.

In August, he signed with Radnik Bijeljina.

=== Groningen ===
In August 2016, Memišević was transferred to Dutch outfit Groningen for an undisclosed fee. He made his official debut for the club on 13 August against Excelsior. On 29 April 2018, he scored his first goal for Groningen against the same opponent.

In April 2019, he extended his contract with the team until June 2021.

He played his 100th game for the side against Fortuna Sittard on 30 November.

=== Later stage of career ===
In February 2020, Memišević joined Chinese club Hebei China Fortune. In April 2022, he was sent on a season-long loan to Beijing Guoan.

In January 2023, he moved to Emirati outfit Al-Nasr.

In January 2026, he signed with Qingdao West Coast.

== International career ==
In May 2016, Memišević received his first senior call up to Bosnia and Herzegovina, for a friendly game against Spain and the 2016 Kirin Cup. He debuted against Spain on 29 May.

== Personal life ==
Memišević's father Midhat was also a professional footballer.

He married his long-time girlfriend Sanida in August 2021. Together they have two daughters named Ella and Mila.

== Career statistics ==
=== Club ===
As of match played 25 July 2026

Appearances and goals by club, season and competition
Club	Season	League			National cup (Note: Includes Bosnian Cup, KNVB Cup, UAE President's Cup, Chinese FA Cup)		League cup (Note: Includes UAE League Cup)		Continental		Other		Total	
Club	Season	Division	Apps	Goals	Apps	Goals	Apps	Goals	Apps	Goals	Apps	Goals	Apps	Goals
Sloboda Tuzla	2012–13	First League of the FBiH	10	1	–		–		–		–		10	1
Teleoptik	2012–13	Serbian First League	9	1	–		–		–		–		9	1
Bežanija	2013–14	Serbian First League	1	0	0	0	–		–		–		1	0
Teleoptik	2013–14	Serbian First League	3	0	–		–		–		–		3	0
Radnik Bijeljina	2014–15	Bosnian Premier League	27	2	0	0	–		–		–		27	2
Radnik Bijeljina	2015–16	Bosnian Premier League	22	1	8	4	–		–		–		30	5
Radnik Bijeljina	2016–17	Bosnian Premier League	1	0	0	0	–		2 (Note: Appearances in UEFA Europa League)	0	–		3	0
Radnik Bijeljina	Total		50	3	8	4	–		2	0	–		60	7
Groningen	2016–17	Eredivisie	25	0	1	0	–		–		1 (Note: Appearance(s) in Eredivisie play-offs for UEFA Europa League)	0	27	0
Groningen	2017–18	Eredivisie	29	1	2	0	–		–		–		31	1
Groningen	2018–19	Eredivisie	33	4	1	0	–		–		2	1	36	5
Groningen	2019–20	Eredivisie	11	1	2	2	–		–		–		13	3
Groningen	Total		98	6	6	2	–		–		3	1	107	9
Hebei China Fortune	2020	Chinese Super League	12	1	0	0	–		–		5 (Note: Appearances in Chinese Super League championship play-offs)	0	17	1
Hebei China Fortune	2021	Chinese Super League	20	0	0	0	–		–		–		20	0
Hebei China Fortune	Total		32	1	0	0	–		–		5	0	37	1
Beijing Guoan (loan)	2022	Chinese Super League	28	4	0	0	–		–		–		28	4
Al-Nasr	2022–23	UAE Pro League	13	1	1	0	0	0	–		–		14	1
Al-Nasr	2023–24	UAE Pro League	23	2	4	1	3	0	–		–		30	3
Al-Nasr	2024–25	UAE Pro League	21	1	1	0	2	0	4 (Note: Appearances in AGCFF Gulf Club Champions League)	1	–		28	2
Al-Nasr	Total		57	4	6	1	5	0	4	1	–		72	6
Qingdao West Coast	2026	Chinese Super League	18	2	1	0	–		–		–		19	2
Career total			306	22	21	7	5	0	6	1	8	1	346	31

=== International ===
Appearances and goals by national team and year
National team	Year	Apps	Goals
Bosnia and Herzegovina
Bosnia and Herzegovina	2016	1	0
Bosnia and Herzegovina	2017	0	0
Bosnia and Herzegovina	2018	1	0
Bosnia and Herzegovina	2019	1	0
Total		3	0

== Honours ==
Radnik Bijeljina

- Bosnian Cup: 2015–16
