= 2023–24 Fortuna Sittard season =

Fortuna Sittard
2023–24 season
- Chairman: Işıtan Gün
- Manager: Danny Buijs
- Stadium: Fortuna Sittard Stadion
- Eredivisie: 12th
- KNVB Cup: Quarter-Finals

The 2023–24 season is Fortuna Sittard's 56th season in existence and sixth consecutive in the Dutch top division Eredivisie. They are also competing in the KNVB Cup.

== Players ==
=== First-team squad ===
As of 19 September 2023

Note: Flags indicate national team as defined under FIFA eligibility rules; some limited exceptions apply. Players may hold more than one non-FIFA nationality.

No.	Pos.	Nation	Player
1	GK	NED	Luuk Koopmans
2	DF	BEL	Siemen Voet (on loan from Slovan Bratislava)
3	DF	GER	Sadik Fofana (on loan from Bayer Leverkusen)
6	MF	CPV	Deroy Duarte
7	FW	ESP	Iñigo Córdoba
9	FW	NED	Kaj Sierhuis
10	MF	CRO	Alen Halilović
11	FW	SRB	Marko Lazetić (on loan from AC Milan)
12	DF	POR	Ivo Pinto (captain)
14	DF	BRA	Rodrigo Guth
15	MF	TUR	Oğuzhan Özyakup
17	FW	NED	Iman Griffith (on loan from AZ)

No.	Pos.	Nation	Player
19	MF	KOS	Arianit Ferati
20	FW	ALG	Mouhamed Belkheir
22	GK	NED	Tom Hendriks
24	DF	CUW	Nathangelo Markelo
31	GK	CRO	Ivor Pandur
32	MF	FRA	Loreintz Rosier
33	DF	GRE	Dimitrios Siovas
34	FW	NED	Ragnar Oratmangoen (on loan from Groningen)
35	DF	NED	Mitchell Dijks
39	FW	BEL	Milan Robberechts
61	DF	FRA	Rémy Vita
77	FW	NED	Tijjani Noslin

=== Out on loan ===
Note: Flags indicate national team as defined under FIFA eligibility rules; some limited exceptions apply. Players may hold more than one non-FIFA nationality.

No.	Pos.	Nation	Player
—	GK	NED	Michael Verrips (at Groningen until 30 June 2024)
—	FW	POR	Umaro Embaló (at Cartagena until 30 June 2024)
—	FW	TUR	Tunahan Taşçı (at MVV until 30 June 2024)

== Transfers ==
=== In ===
Pos.	Player	Transferred from	Fee	Date	Source
MF	(Algeria) Mouhamed Belkheir	(Portugal) Vilafranquense	Free	5 July 2023	
DF	(Netherlands) Mitchell Dijks	(Netherlands) SBV Vitesse	Free	18 July 2023	
MF	(France) Loreintz Rosier	(Portugal) Estoril	Free	18 July 2023	
FW	(Netherlands) Kaj Sierhuis	(France) Stade de Reims	€500,000	2 August 2023	

=== Out ===
Pos.	Player	Transferred to	Fee	Date	Source
MF	(Turkey) Doğan Erdoğan	(Turkey) Göztepe	Free	14 September 2023	

== Pre-season and friendlies ==
Win Draw Loss Fixtures

29 July 2023 Friendly	Millwall (England)	1–2	(Netherlands) Fortuna Sittard
13:30

4 August 2023 Friendly	Beerschot (Belgium)	0–0	(Netherlands) Fortuna Sittard
19:00

5 August 2023 Friendly	VVV-Venlo (Netherlands)	2–3	(Netherlands) Fortuna Sittard
17:00

11 October 2023 Friendly	Fortuna Sittard (Netherlands)	3–0	(Netherlands) TOP Oss
13:00		Report

== Competitions ==
=== Overall record ===
Competition	First match	Last match	Starting round	Record							
Competition	First match	Last match	Starting round	Pld	W	D	L	GF	GA	GD	Win %
Eredivisie	12 August 2023	19 May 2024	Matchday 1	15	5	4	6	16	24	−8	33.33
KNVB Cup	1 November 2023		First round	1	1	0	0	1	0	+1	100.00
Total				16	6	4	6	17	24	−7	37.50

Last updated: December 2023
Source: Soccerway

=== Eredivisie ===
==== League table ====
Pos	Team	Pld	W	D	L	GF	GA	GD	Pts	Qualification or relegation
8	Sparta Rotterdam	34	14	7	13	51	48	+3	49	Qualification for the European competition play-offs
9	Go Ahead Eagles (O)	34	12	10	12	47	46	+1	46	Qualification for the European competition play-offs
10	Fortuna Sittard	34	9	11	14	37	56	−19	38	
11	Heerenveen	34	10	7	17	53	70	−17	37	
12	PEC Zwolle	34	9	9	16	45	67	−22	36	

Source: Eredivisie
Rules for classification: Season in progress: 1) Most points won; 2) Less points lost; 3) Goal difference; 4) Goals scored; 5) Alphabetical order; End of season: 1) Points; 2) Goal difference; 3) Goals scored; 4) Head-to-head points; 5) Head-to-head goal difference; 6) Head-to-head away goals scored; 7) Play-off if relevant for deciding champion, relegation or participating in a European league, otherwise by draw. 8) Penalty shoot-out (only after a play-off)
(O) Play-off winners

==== Results summary ====
Overall								Home						Away					
Pld	W	D	L	GF	GA	GD	Pts	W	D	L	GF	GA	GD	W	D	L	GF	GA	GD
0	0	0	0	0	0	0	0	0	0	0	0	0	0	0	0	0	0	0	0

Last updated: December 2023.

==== Results by round ====
Round	1	2	3	4	5	6	7	8	9	10	11	12	13	14	15	16	17	18	19	20	21	22	23	24	25	26	27	28	29	30	31	32	33
Ground	A	H	A	H	H	A	A	H	A	H	A	H	A	H	H	A	H	A	A	H	A	H	A	H	A	H	A	H	A	H	A	H	A
Result	D	W	D	D	W	L	L	L	L	D	L	W	L	W	W	L	L	D	W	D	L	L	W	W	D	W	L	D	L	L	L	D	
Position	8	8	9	9	5	8	10	10	13	13	14	11	13	11	9	10	11	12	10	10	12	13	12	11	10	9	10	10	10	11	12	11	

A = Away; H = Home; W = Win; D = Draw; L = Loss

==== Matches ====
The league fixtures were unveiled on 30 June 2023.

13 August 2023 1	Feyenoord	0–0	Fortuna Sittard
14:30 CEST (UTC+2)

=== KNVB Cup ===
1 November 2023 First round	Sparta Nijkerk	0–1	Fortuna Sittard	Nijkerk
20:00 CET (UTC+1)		Report		Stadium: Sportpark De Ebbenhorst; Referee: Robin Vereijken

19 December 2023 Second round	Eindhoven	0–2	Fortuna Sittard	Eindhoven
20:00 CET (UTC+1)		Report	30' Noslin; 49' Sierhuis	Stadium: Jan Louwers Stadion; Attendance: 2,394

17 January 2024 Round of 16	Almere City	1–2	Fortuna Sittard	Almere
20:00 CET	Hansen 90+2'	Report	Sierhuis 25', 42'	Stadium: Yanmar Stadion; Attendance: 3,513; Referee: Allard Lindhout
