= Amir Absalem =

Dutch footballer (born 1997)

Personal information
- Date of birth: 19 June 1997 (age 29)
- Place of birth: Capelle aan den IJssel, Netherlands
- Height: 1.75 m (5 ft 9 in)
- Position: Left-back

Team information
- Current team: PKC '83

Youth career
- –2004: Swift Boys
- 2004–2005: Excelsior
- 2005–2016: Feyenoord

Senior career*
Years	Team	Apps	(Gls)
2016–2017	Jong Groningen	50	(5)
2017–2020	Groningen	16	(0)
2020	→ Almere City (loan)	6	(0)
2020–2022	Roda JC	67	(1)
2022–2024	ADO Den Haag	40	(2)
2024–2026	Helmond Sport	57	(0)
2026–	PKC '83		
- * Club domestic league appearances and goals as of 28 April 2026

Amir Absalem (born 19 June 1997) is a Dutch professional footballer who plays as a left-back for an amateur side PKC '83.

== Club career ==
On 25 August 2022, Absalem signed a one-season deal with ADO Den Haag. He left the club at the end of the 2023–24 season, as his contract was not extended.

Absalem joined Eerste Divisie club Helmond Sport on 26 June 2024, signing a two-year contract. He made his debut in the opening fixture of the season, starting in a 1–1 home draw against Jong Utrecht.

== Personal life ==
Absalem was born in the Netherlands to a Moroccan-Algerian father, and Dutch mother.

== Career statistics ==
As of match played 9 August 2024

Appearances and goals by club, season and competition
Club	Season	League			Cup		Europe		Other		Total	
Club	Season	Division	Apps	Goals	Apps	Goals	Apps	Goals	Apps	Goals	Apps	Goals
Jong Groningen	2016–17	Derde Divisie	30	1	—		—		—		30	1
Jong Groningen	2017–18	Derde Divisie	13	2	—		—		—		13	2
Jong Groningen	2018–19	Derde Divisie	7	2	—		—		—		7	2
Jong Groningen	Total		50	5	—		—		—		50	5
Groningen	2017–18	Eredivisie	8	0	1	0	—		—		9	0
Groningen	2018–19	Eredivisie	3	0	0	0	—		—		3	0
Groningen	2019–20	Eredivisie	5	0	1	0	—		—		6	0
Groningen	Total		16	0	2	0	—		—		18	0
Almere City (loan)	2019–20	Eerste Divisie	6	0	0	0	—		—		6	0
Roda JC Kerkrade	2020–21	Eerste Divisie	30	1	1	0	—		2 (Note: Appearances in Eredivisie promotion/relegation play-offs)	0	33	1
Roda JC Kerkrade	2022–23	Eerste Divisie	37	0	2	0	—		2	0	41	0
Roda JC Kerkrade	Total		67	1	3	0	—		4	0	74	1
ADO Den Haag	2022–23	Eerste Divisie	16	0	3	0	—		—		19	0
ADO Den Haag	2023–24	Eerste Divisie	24	2	3	0	—		3	1	30	3
ADO Den Haag	Total		40	2	6	0	—		3	1	49	3
Helmond Sport	2024–25	Eerste Divisie	1	0	0	0	—		—		1	0
Career total			180	8	11	0	0	0	7	1	198	9
