= Deyovaisio Zeefuik =

Dutch footballer (born 1998)

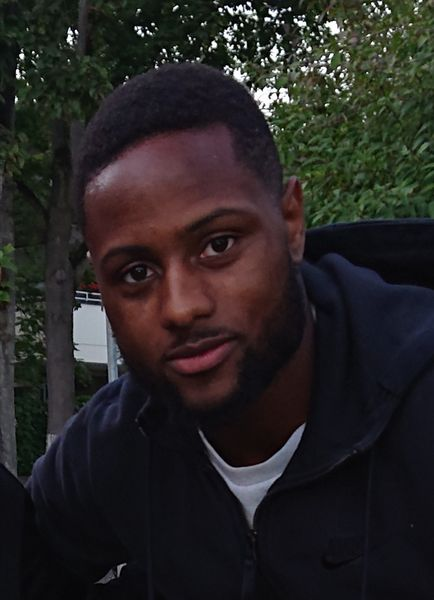
- Zeefuik in 2021

Personal information
- Date of birth: 11 March 1998 (age 28)
- Place of birth: Amsterdam, Netherlands
- Height: 1.77 m (5 ft 10 in)
- Position: Right back

Team information
- Current team: Hertha BSC
- Number: 42

Youth career
- 2004–2006: D.W.V
- 2006–2016: Ajax

Senior career*
Years	Team	Apps	(Gls)
2016–2018	Jong Ajax	34	(1)
2017–2018	Ajax	6	(0)
2018	→ Groningen (loan)	13	(0)
2018–2020	Groningen	58	(1)
2020–	Hertha BSC	105	(3)
2022	→ Blackburn Rovers (loan)	6	(0)
2023	→ Hellas Verona (loan)	1	(0)

International career^{‡}
2014	Netherlands U17	1	(0)
2015–2016	Netherlands U18	2	(0)
2016–2017	Netherlands U19	10	(0)
2017–2018	Netherlands U20	8	(0)
2018–2021	Netherlands U21	15	(2)
- * Club domestic league appearances and goals as of 18 May 2026 ‡ National team caps and goals as of 30 March 2021

Deyovaisio Zeefuik (born 11 March 1998) is a Dutch professional footballer who plays as a right back for 2. Bundesliga club Hertha BSC.

== Club career ==
=== Ajax & Jong Ajax ===
Zeefuik is a youth exponent from AFC Ajax. He made his professional debut at Jong Ajax on 8 August 2016 in an Eerste Divisie game against FC Emmen.

=== FC Groningen ===
On 30 January 2018, it was announced that Zeefuik was loaned at FC Groningen until the end of the season. On 18 May 2018, Zeefuik signed a three-year contract at FC Groningen, officially transferring him from Ajax.

=== Hertha Berlin ===
On 6 August 2020, Zeefuik transferred to Bundesliga side Hertha BSC.

=== Blackburn Rovers ===
On 14 January 2022, Blackburn Rovers announced the signing of Zeefuik on loan, with a view to making the deal permanent at the end of the season.

=== Hellas Verona ===
On 16 January 2023, Zeefuik joined Hellas Verona in Italy on loan until 30 June 2023, with an option to buy.

== International career ==
Deyovaisio Zeefuik's first call-up to the Netherlands under-21 national team was announced on 9 November 2018, after already appearing in the provisional squad published on 31 October 2018. He was selected for the friendly against Germany U21 in Offenbach on 16 November. He then made his Netherlands U21 debut in the 3–0 defeat to Germany U21 on 16 November 2018.

== Personal life ==
Born in the Netherlands, Zeefuik is of Surinamese descent. He is the brother of fellow footballers Género Zeefuik and Lequincio Zeefuik.

== Career statistics ==
As of match played 12 November 2024

Appearances and goals by club, season and competition
Club	Season	League			National Cup		Other		Total	
Club	Season	Division	Apps	Goals	Apps	Goals	Apps	Goals	Apps	Goals
Jong Ajax	2016–17	Eerste Divisie	27	1	—		—		27	1
Jong Ajax	2017–18	Eerste Divisie	7	0	—		—		7	0
Jong Ajax	Total		34	1	—		—		34	1
Ajax	2016–17	Eredivisie	1	0	0	0	—		1	0
Ajax	2017–18	Eredivisie	5	0	2	0	1 (Note: Appearances in UEFA Europa League)	0	8	0
Ajax	Total		6	0	2	0	1	0	9	0
Groningen (loan)	2017–18	Eredivisie	13	0	—		—		13	0
Groningen	2018–19	Eredivisie	32	1	0	0	—		32	1
Groningen	2019–20	Eredivisie	26	0	2	0	—		28	0
Groningen	Total		71	1	2	0	—		73	1
Hertha BSC	2020–21	Bundesliga	22	1	0	0	—		22	1
Hertha BSC	2021–22	Bundesliga	11	0	1	0	—		12	0
Hertha BSC	2022–23	Bundesliga	0	0	1	0	—		1	0
Hertha BSC	2023–24	2. Bundesliga	18	0	3	0	—		21	0
Hertha BSC	2024–25	2. Bundesliga	31	1	3	0	—		34	1
Hertha BSC	2025-26	2. Bundesliga	23	0	—		—		23	0
Hertha BSC	2026-27	2. Bundesliga	10	3	2	0	—		12	3
Hertha BSC	Total		115	5	10	0	—		68	2
Blackburn Rovers (loan)	2021–22	EFL Championship	6	0	—		—		6	0
Hellas Verona (loan)	2022–23	Serie A	1	0	—		—		1	0
Career total			233	7	14	0	1	0	248	7

== Honours ==
Jong Ajax

- Eerste Divisie: 2017–18
