= Lars Kramer =

Dutch footballer (born 1999)

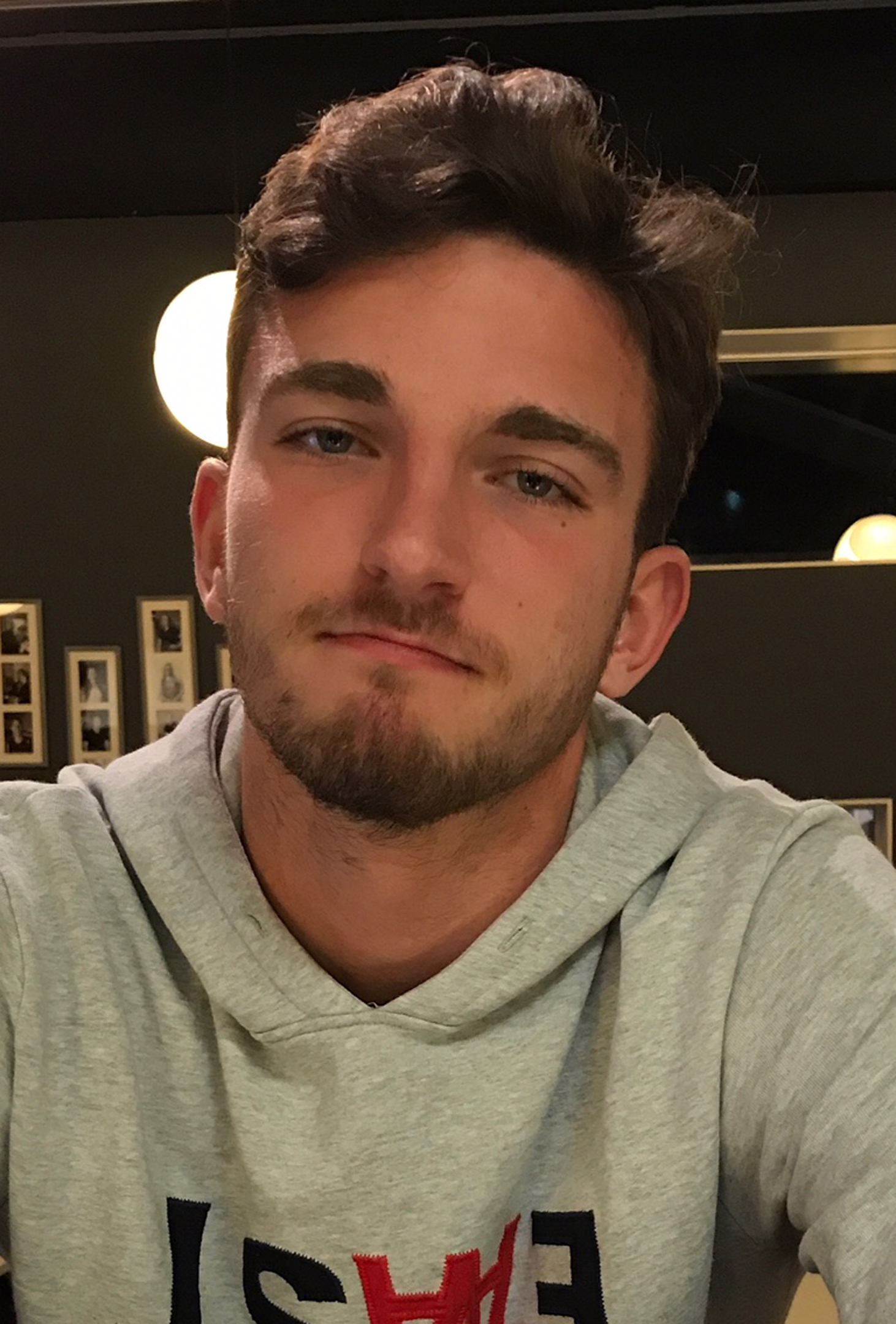
- Kramer in 2018

Personal information
- Date of birth: 11 July 1999
- Place of birth: Zaandam, Netherlands
- Height: 1.92 m (6 ft 4 in)
- Position: Centre-back

Team information
- Current team: Rapid București
- Number: 6

Youth career
- –2010: Fortuna Wormerveer
- 2010–2016: Ajax
- 2016–2017: NEC

Senior career*
Years	Team	Apps	(Gls)
2017–2019	Jong Groningen	44	(5)
2018–2019	Groningen	1	(0)
2019–2022	Viborg	86	(7)
2022–2025	AaB	90	(6)
2025–	Rapid București	46	(2)

International career
2018–2019	Netherlands U20	6	(0)
- * Club domestic league appearances and goals as of 7 November 2026

Lars Kramer (born 11 July 1999) is a Dutch professional footballer who plays as a centre-back for Liga I club Rapid Bucureşti, which he captains.

== Club career ==
From Zaandam, Kramer played youth football with Fortuna Wormerveer before training with Ajax Youth Academy. In 2016, he made the switch to NEC Nijmegen. However, he only played for their U19 side apart from featuring in a back three for NEC in a friendly match against De Graafschap in March 2017.

=== Groningen ===
Despite being offered a new contract by NEC, and just a year after joining the club, he opted for a transfer to FC Groningen in June 2017, to initially join up with their reserve side. He made his first team debut as a substitute for Groningen away in the Eredivisie in a 3–0 defeat against Feyenoord on 8 February 2018.

=== Viborg ===
On 30 June 2019, Kramer joined Danish club Viborg FF on a 3-year deal. He made a goalscoring debut for Viborg scoring the first goal in a 3–0 victory against FC Roskilde on 26 July 2019. Viborg won the Danish 1st Division in the 2020–21 season.

=== AaB ===
In June 2022, after three seasons with Viborg he signed for AaB Fodbold on a three-year contract. He made his debut for AaB on 17 July 2022, starting in the Danish Superliga in a 2–1 defeat against his former club Viborg. He scored his first goal for the club in the league against OB on 30 September 2022, opening the scoring in a 1–1 draw.

=== Rapid Bucureşti ===
On 23 June 2025, Kramer signed a two-year deal with Romanian club Rapid Bucureşti.

== International career ==
On 20 November 2018, Kramer made his debut for the Netherlands U20s during a 3–2 victory over Italy U20s in Katwijk aan Zee, coming on as a substitute for Shaquille Pinas in the 70th minute.

== Career statistics ==
=== Club ===
As of match played 7 November 2026

Appearances and goals by club, season and competition
Club	Season	League			National cup (Note: Includes Danish Cup, Cupa României)		Europe		Other		Total	
Club	Season	Division	Apps	Goals	Apps	Goals	Apps	Goals	Apps	Goals	Apps	Goals
Jong Groningen	2017–18	Derde Divisie	26	1	—		—		—		26	1
Jong Groningen	2018–19	Derde Divisie	18	4	—		—		—		40	1
Jong Groningen	Total		44	5	—		—		—		44	5
Groningen	2017–18	Eredivisie	1	0	0	0	—		—		1	0
Groningen	2018–19	Eredivisie	0	0	0	0	—		0	0	34	3
Groningen	Total		1	0	0	0	—		0	0	1	0
Viborg	2019–20	Danish 1st Division	31	3	0	0	—		—		31	3
Viborg	2020–21	Danish 1st Division	32	0	1	0	—		—		33	0
Viborg	2021–22	Danish Superliga	23	4	1	0	—		—		24	4
Viborg	Total		86	7	2	0	—		—		88	7
AaB	2022–23	Danish Superliga	31	2	6	0	—		—		37	2
AaB	2023–24	Danish 1st Division	30	4	3	1	—		—		33	5
AaB	2024–25	Danish Superliga	29	0	5	2	—		—		34	2
AaB	Total		90	6	14	3	—		—		104	9
Rapid București	2025–26	Liga I	31	1	2	1	—		—		33	2
Rapid București	2026–27	Liga I	15	1	2	0	—		—		17	1
Rapid București	Total		46	2	4	1	—		—		50	3
Career total			267	20	20	4	—		0	0	287	24

== Honours ==
Viborg

- Danish 1st Division: 2020–21

AaB

- Danish Cup runner-up: 2022–23
