= Jan Hoekstra =

Dutch footballer (born 1998)

Personal information
- Date of birth: 4 August 1998 (age 28)
- Place of birth: Eexterveen, Netherlands
- Height: 2.00 m (6 ft 7 in)
- Position: Goalkeeper

Youth career
- 2010–2017: Groningen

Senior career*
Years	Team	Apps	(Gls)
2017–2019	Jong Groningen	49	(1)
2017–2023	Groningen	0	(0)
2020–2021	→ Roda JC (loan)	25	(0)
2023	→ PEC Zwolle (loan)	0	(0)
2023–2025	Emmen	30	(0)
2025–2026	Bordeaux	25	(0)

International career
2018	Netherlands U20	3	(0)
2019	Netherlands U21	1	(0)
- * Club domestic league appearances and goals as of 4 December 2025

Jan Hoekstra (born 4 August 1998) is a Dutch professional footballer who most recently played as a goalkeeper for French side Bordeaux.

== Career ==
Hoekstra joined the youth academy of Groningen in 2010, and signed his first professional contract with them in 2018. He signed on loan with Roda for the 2020–21 season. He made his professional debut with Roda in a 4–0 Eerste Divisie win over Jong Ajax on 30 August 2020.

On 31 January 2023, Hoekstra joined PEC Zwolle on loan.

On 11 July 2023, Hoekstra signed a three-year contract with Emmen.

He moved to Bordeaux in summer 2025, but after a good season he left the club when they were administratively relegated to the amateur 6th-tier.
