= Paul Gladon =

Dutch footballer (born 1992)

Personal information
- Date of birth: 18 March 1992 (age 34)
- Place of birth: Hoofddorp, Netherlands
- Height: 1.88 m (6 ft 2 in)
- Position: Forward

Team information
- Current team: NAC Breda
- Number: 19

Youth career
- 1998–2009: SV Hoofddorp
- 2009–2011: Sparta Rotterdam

Senior career*
Years	Team	Apps	(Gls)
2011–2015	Sparta Rotterdam	48	(13)
2013–2014	→ Dordrecht (loan)	36	(17)
2015–2016	Heracles Almelo	27	(6)
2016–2019	Wolverhampton Wanderers	2	(0)
2017–2018	→ Heracles Almelo (loan)	32	(6)
2018	→ Sint-Truiden (loan)	1	(0)
2019	Groningen	14	(5)
2019–2021	Willem II	22	(1)
2021	Emmen	12	(2)
2022–2023	Fortuna Sittard	40	(10)
2023–2024	Noah	22	(9)
2025–2026	Fortuna Sittard	31	(5)
2026–	NAC Breda	0	(0)
- * Club domestic league appearances and goals as of 21 May 2026

Gladon playing for Fortuna Sittard

Paul Gladon (born 18 March 1992) is a Dutch professional footballer who plays as forward for Eerste Divisie club NAC Breda.

He previously played in the Netherlands for Sparta Rotterdam, FC Dordrecht and Heracles Almelo respectively before a short stay with English side Wolverhampton Wanderers. He subsequently played on loan for Belgian club Sint-Truiden before returning to the Netherlands where he played for Groningen, Willem II, Emmen and Fortuna Sittard.

== Career ==
=== Sparta Rotterdam ===
Gladon started playing football as a six-year-old at the local football club SV Hoofddorp, where he played until reaching the under-17 team. He then went on to play for the under-19 side of Sparta Rotterdam, led by coach Arjan van der Laan. In November 2010, he made his debut with Jong Sparta in an away match against Jong Ajax, and in January 2011 he made his debut in the first-team squad, in the derby against Feyenoord, which was also the last matchup for the Rotterdam Silver Ball. He signed a professional contract with Sparta until mid-2015. While on loan at Dordrecht from the club, Gladon scored a 19-minute hat-trick for against Volendam on 8 March 2014.

=== Wolverhampton Wanderers ===
On 26 August 2016, he moved from Heracles Almelo to English Championship club Wolverhampton Wanderers on a three-year deal (with the option of a further year) for an undisclosed fee. He made his club debut on 10 September 2016 in a 1–1 draw with Burton Albion.

On 29 June 2017, after only making three appearances in all competitions for Wolves, he re-joined his former club Heracles Almelo on a season-long loan.

At the start of the following season, by which time Wolves had been promoted to the Premier League, Gladon still remained outside of their first team plans. Instead, he moved to Belgium First Division side Sint-Truiden on loan in a move scheduled to last until the end of the season. However, he failed to break into the side and made just one league appearance as a substitute.

In January 2019, after not having featured for Wolves since September 2016, Gladon's contract with the club was terminated by mutual consent.

=== Groningen ===
On 16 January 2019, he agreed a deal with Dutch club Groningen for the remainder of the season.

=== Willem II ===
Eight months later, on 7 August 2019, Gladon signed a two-year contract with Willem II. On 30 January 2021, his contract was terminated by mutual consent.

=== Emmen ===
Gladon signed a six-month contract with Emmen on 1 February 2021, after having terminated his contract with Willem II by mutual consent. He made his debut for the club on 6 February 2021 in a 1–0 loss to AZ. At the end of the season, he experienced relegation with Emmen and on 1 July 2021, his contract expired making him a free agent.

=== Fortuna Sittard ===
In February 2022, after seven months as a free agent, Gladon signed a short-term contract with Eredivisie club Fortuna Sittard. He made his debut for the club against his former side Groningen on 12 February, entering the game in the 92nd minute to replace Mats Seuntjens. He helped Fortuna secure a 1–0 away win, marking their first victory away at Groningen since 1987. On 16 April, Gladon scored his first goals for Fortuna, contributing to a 3–0 league win over Sparta with his brace. On the last matchday of the season, he assisted Zian Flemming's only goal, which proved pivotal in securing Fortuna's place in the Eredivisie and survive relegation.

Gladon extended his contract with Fortuna on 17 June 2022, signing a two-year deal until 2024. He scored his second brace for the club on 13 November 2022, helping Fortuna to a 3–2 league win over Groningen.

=== Noah ===
On 24 August 2023, Gladon signed with Noah in Armenia.

=== Return to Fortuna Sittard ===
After sitting out the 2024–25 season, on 6 June 2025 Gladon signed with Fortuna Sittard for one season.

== Career statistics ==
As of match played 23 April 2023

Appearances and goals by club, season and competition
Club	Season	League			National Cup		League Cup		Other		Total	
Club	Season	Division	Apps	Goals	Apps	Goals	Apps	Goals	Apps	Goals	Apps	Goals
Sparta Rotterdam	2010–11	Eerste Divisie	2	0	0	0	—		0	0	2	0
Sparta Rotterdam	2011–12	Eerste Divisie	1	0	1	0	—		0	0	2	0
Sparta Rotterdam	2012–13	Eerste Divisie	9	0	0	0	—		0	0	9	0
Sparta Rotterdam	2014–15	Eerste Divisie	36	13	1	2	—		0	0	37	15
Sparta Rotterdam	Total		48	13	2	2	—		0	0	50	15
Dordrecht (loan)	2013–14	Eerste Divisie	36	17	1	0	—		4 (Note: Appearances in Eredivisie promotion/relegation playoffs)	3	41	20
Heracles Almelo	2015–16	Eredivisie	24	4	2	2	—		0	0	26	6
Heracles Almelo	2016–17	Eredivisie	3	2	0	0	—		2 (Note: Appearances in UEFA Europa League)	1	5	3
Heracles Almelo	Total		27	6	2	2	—		2	1	31	9
Wolverhampton Wanderers	2016–17	Championship	2	0	0	0	1	0	0	0	3	0
Heracles Almelo (loan)	2017–18	Eredivisie	32	6	3	0	—		0	0	35	6
Sint-Truiden (loan)	2018–19	Belgian Pro League	1	0	1	0	—		0	0	2	0
Groningen	2018–19	Eredivisie	14	5	0	0	—		2	0	14	5
Willem II	2019–20	Eredivisie	18	1	3	1	—		0	0	21	2
Willem II	2020–21	Eredivisie	4	0	0	0	—		0	0	4	0
Willem II	Total		22	1	3	1	—		0	0	25	2
Emmen	2020–21	Eredivisie	13	2	0	0	—		1	0	14	2
Fortuna Sittard	2021–22	Eredivisie	11	3	0	0	—		—		11	3
Fortuna Sittard	2022–23	Eredivisie	23	4	1	0	—		—		24	4
Fortuna Sittard	Total		34	7	1	0	—		—		35	7
Career total			229	57	13	5	1	0	7	4	250	66
