= Kevin Begois =

Belgian footballer (born 1982)

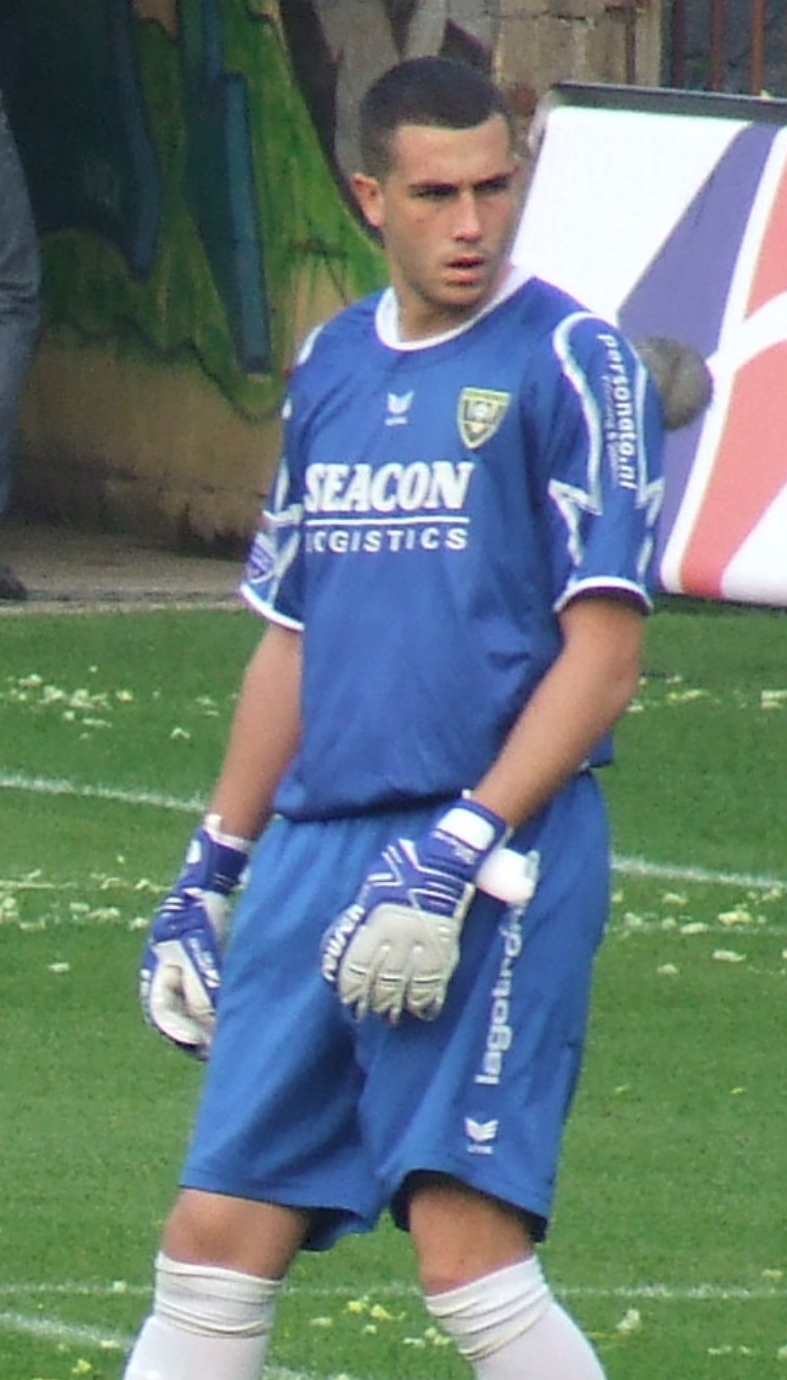
- Begois in 2007

Personal information
- Date of birth: 13 May 1982 (age 44)
- Place of birth: Antwerp, Belgium
- Height: 1.85 m (6 ft 1 in)
- Position: Goalkeeper

Team information
- Current team: PSV (youth goalkeeper coach)

Senior career*
Years	Team	Apps	(Gls)
2002–2003	K.V. Mechelen	5	(0)
2002–2006	VVV-Venlo	89	(0)
2006	Roda JC	2	(0)
2006–2007	Helmond Sport	29	(0)
2007–2011	VVV-Venlo	69	(0)
2011–2013	Den Bosch	55	(0)
2013–2017	PEC Zwolle	30	(0)
2017–2019	FC Groningen	0	(0)
2017–2019	Jong FC Groningen	2	(0)
- * Club domestic league appearances and goals

Kevin Begois (born 13 May 1982) is a Belgian former professional footballer who played as a goalkeeper. He works as a goalkeeper coach for the youth sector of PSV Eindhoven.

== Coaching career ==
After retiring at the end of the 2018–19, Begois was hired as a goalkeeper coach for the youth sector of PSV Eindhoven.

== Career statistics ==
As of match played 14 May 2017

Appearances and goals by club, season and competition
Club	Season	League			National cup		Other		Total	
Club	Season	Division	Apps	Goals	Apps	Goals	Apps	Goals	Apps	Goals
Mechelen	2002–03	Belgian First Division	5	0	0	0	0	0	5	0
VVV-Venlo	2002–03	Eerste Divisie	9	0	0	0	0	0	9	0
VVV-Venlo	2003–04	Eerste Divisie	35	0	0	0	0	0	35	0
VVV-Venlo	2004–05	Eerste Divisie	33	0	0	0	0	0	33	0
VVV-Venlo	2005–06	Eerste Divisie	12	0	0	0	0	0	12	0
VVV-Venlo	Total		89	0	0	0	0	0	89	0
Roda	2005–06	Eredivisie	2	0	0	0	0	0	2	0
Helmond Sport	2006–07	Eerste Divisie	28	0	0	0	0	0	28	0
VVV-Venlo	2007–08	Eredivisie	13	0	0	0	0	0	13	0
VVV-Venlo	2008–09	Eerste Divisie	20	0	0	0	0	0	20	0
VVV-Venlo	2009–10	Eredivisie	20	0	1	0	0	0	21	0
VVV-Venlo	2010–11	Eredivisie	15	0	0	0	0	0	15	0
VVV-Venlo	Total		68	0	1	0	0	0	69	0
Den Bosch	2011–12	Eerste Divisie	28	0	2	0	5 (Note: Appearances in the Eerste Divisie promotion play-offs)	0	35	0
Den Bosch	2012–13	Eerste Divisie	27	0	2	0	0	0	29	0
Den Bosch	Total		55	0	4	0	5	0	64	0
PEC Zwolle	2013–14	Eredivisie	13	0	2	0	0	0	15	0
PEC Zwolle	2014–15	Eredivisie	0	0	0	0	0	0	0	0
PEC Zwolle	2015–16	Eredivisie	17	0	1	0	0	0	18	0
PEC Zwolle	2016–17	Eredivisie	0	0	0	0	0	0	0	0
PEC Zwolle	Total		30	0	3	0	0	0	33	0
Groningen	2017–18	Eredivisie	0	0	0	0	0	0	0	0
Career total			277	0	8	0	5	0	290	0

== Honours ==
VVV-Venlo

- Eerste Divisie: 2008–09

PEC Zwolle

- KNVB Cup: 2013–14
