= Tom van de Looi =

Dutch footballer

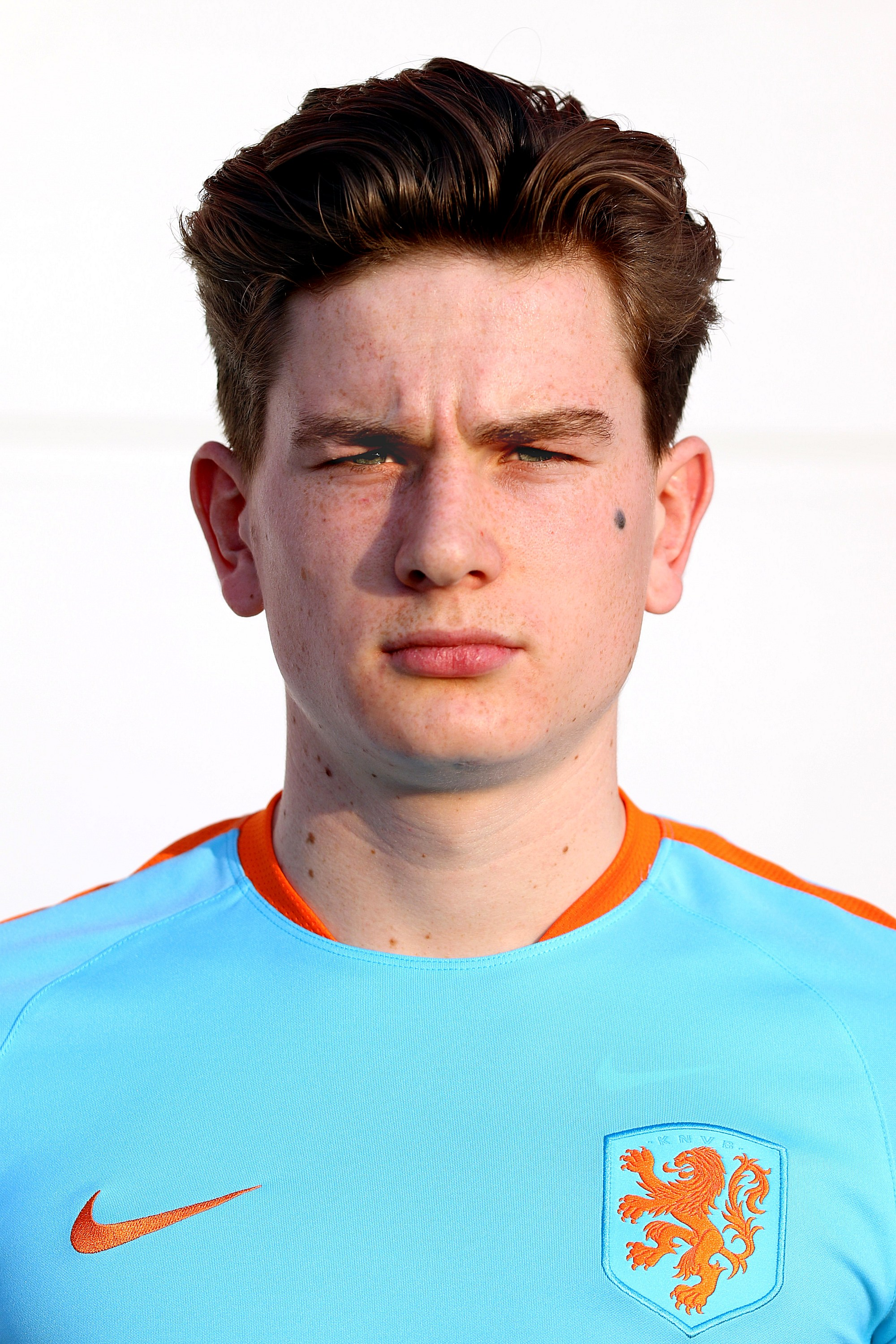

Personal information
- Date of birth: 2 July 1999 (age 27)
- Place of birth: Breda, Netherlands
- Height: 1.86 m (6 ft 1 in)
- Position: Midfielder

Team information
- Current team: Famalicão
- Number: 6

Youth career
- –2017: FC Groningen

Senior career*
Years	Team	Apps	(Gls)
2017–2019	Jong FC Groningen	17	(1)
2018–2020	FC Groningen	34	(0)
2019–2020	→ NEC (loan)	19	(1)
2020–2024	Brescia	126	(6)
2024–	Famalicão	59	(0)

International career
2016	Netherlands U17	4	(0)
2016–2017	Netherlands U18	7	(1)
2017–2018	Netherlands U19	8	(1)
2018–2019	Netherlands U20	9	(1)
- * Club domestic league appearances and goals as of 25 May 2026

Tom van de Looi (born 2 July 1999) is a Dutch professional footballer who plays as a midfielder for Liga Portugal club Famalicão. His father is football manager and former footballer Erwin van de Looi.

== Club career ==
On 14 August 2019 he joined NEC on loan for the 2019–20 season.

=== Brescia ===
In September 2020, he joined Serie B club Brescia on a permanent deal from Eredivisie club Groningen.

== Career statistics ==
=== Club ===
As of match played on 21 March 2018

Appearances and goals by club, season and competition
Club	Season	League			Cup		League Cup		Other		Total	
Club	Season	Division	Apps	Goals	Apps	Goals	Apps	Goals	Apps	Goals	Apps	Goals
Groningen	2017–18	Eredivisie	10	0	0	0	—				10	0
Career totals			10	0	0	0	0	0	0	0	10	0
