= Mike te Wierik =

Dutch footballer

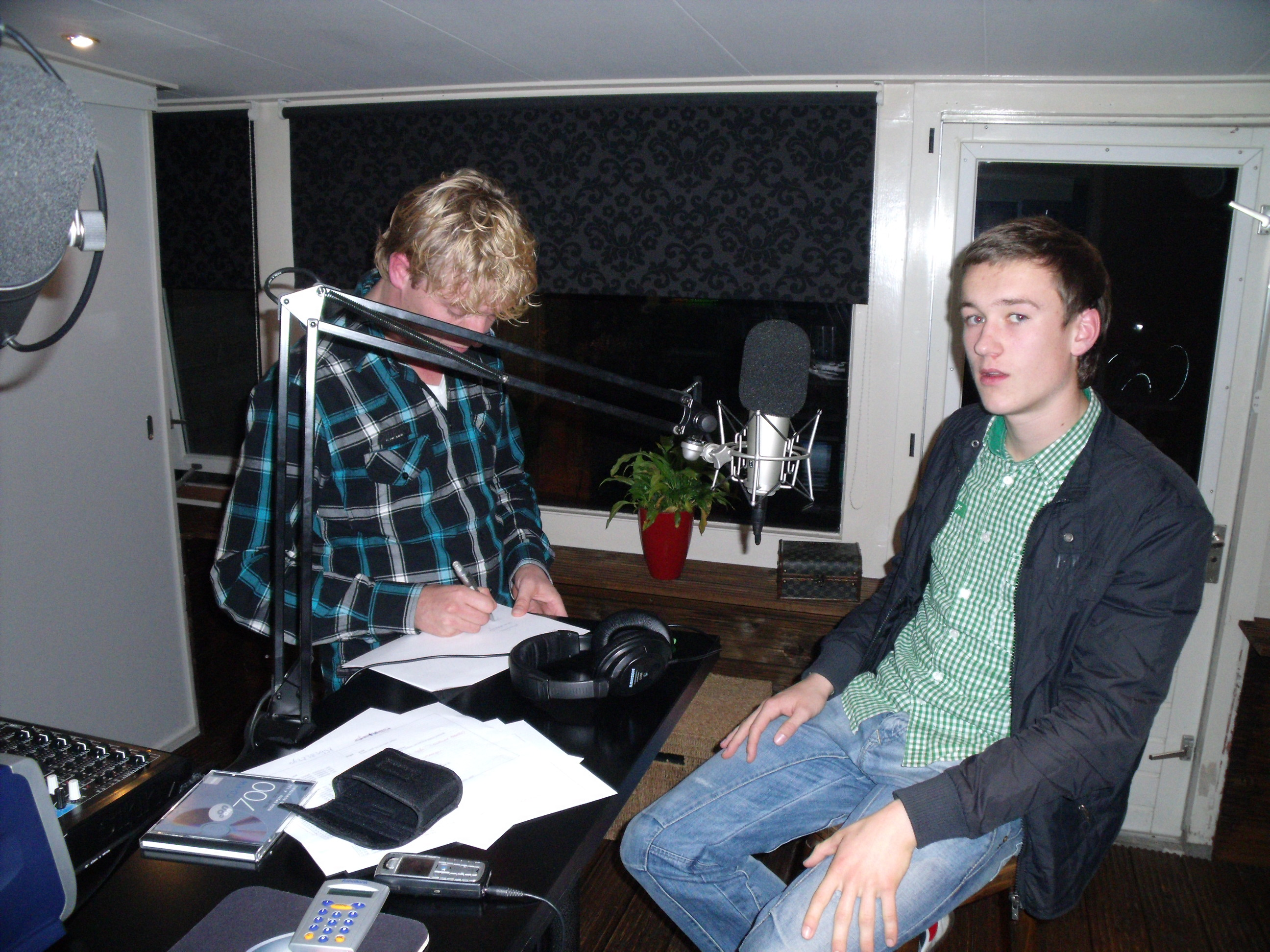
- Te Wierik at a radio programme in 2009

Personal information
- Full name: Mike Jarno Maria te Wierik
- Date of birth: 8 June 1992 (age 34)
- Place of birth: Hengevelde, Netherlands
- Height: 1.91 m (6 ft 3 in)
- Position: Centre-back

Team information
- Current team: Heracles Almelo
- Number: 23

Youth career
- 2009-2010: Heracles Almelo

Senior career*
Years	Team	Apps	(Gls)
2010–2017	Heracles Almelo	144	(6)
2017–2020	Groningen	89	(2)
2020–2021	Derby County	4	(0)
2021–2023	Groningen	57	(0)
2023–2025	Emmen	83	(6)
2025–	Heracles Almelo	22	(1)

International career
2013	Netherlands U20	2	(0)
2014	Netherlands U21	4	(0)
- * Club domestic league appearances and goals as of 21 May 2026

Mike Jarno Maria te Wierik (born 8 June 1992) is a Dutch professional footballer who plays as a centre-back for Eerste Divisie club Heracles Almelo.

== Club career ==
=== Early career ===
Te Wierik started his career with Heracles Almelo. He scored his first professional goal in a memorable 3–3 draw with Ajax on 20 October 2012.

=== FC Groningen ===
He moved to FC Groningen in 2017, signing a three-year deal. In 2018, he became the captain at the Euroborg. He scored his first goal for the club in a 3–3 draw against PSV on 13 December 2017.

=== Derby County ===
On 6 February 2020 it was announced that te Wierik had signed a pre-contract agreement to join Derby County in the summer of 2020 when his contract with FC Groningen expires. Te Wierik agreed a three-year deal which will run until the summer of 2023. Upon signing with the club, Derby County boss Phillip Cocu described him as "a good defender and a leader, which is demonstrated by the fact he is FC Groningen's captain, and he will be a very good signing for us." Te Wierik made his Derby debut in an EFL cup penalty-victory over Barrow Town and his league debut in a 0–2 defeat to Reading. He was later dropped from the first team, with Derby boss Cocu explaining the decision because te Wierik needed some time to "get used" to Championship football. After the sacking of Cocu, te Wierik failed to make a match day squad under new interim manager Wayne Rooney, being behind a number of other players for first-team places.

Ahead of the reopening of the January 2021 transfer window it was reported that te Wieirk had been told he was free to find another club. Te Wierik was linked with five clubs in the January 2021 transfer window, with four Dutch clubs (former club FC Groningen, Fortuna Sittard, FC Utrecht and Heracles Almelo) and German 2. Bundesliga side FC St. Pauli expressing an interest. Te Wierik agreed a deal to return to FC Groningen and, when discussing his time at Derby, admitted that he had not played well enough.

=== Return to Groningen ===
On 19 January 2021, he rejoined Groningen, signing a three-and-a-half-year deal. Te Wierik started his first game for them against Vitesse in a 1–0 away defeat on 23 January 2021.

=== Emmen ===
On 1 February 2023, te Wierik signed a two-and-a-half-year contract with Emmen.

=== Return to Heracles ===
On 24 July 2025, te Wierik officially returned to Heracles Almelo after a tryout.

== International career ==
Te Wierik represented the Netherlands at under-20 and under-21 youth levels in 2013–14.

== Career statistics ==
As of match played 31 October 2020

Appearances and goals by club, season and competition
Club	Season	League			National Cup		Other		Total	
Club	Season	Division	Apps	Goals	Apps	Goals	Apps	Goals	Apps	Goals
Heracles	2010–11	Eredivisie	4	0	0	0	—		4	0
Heracles	2011–12	Eredivisie	9	0	0	0	—		9	0
Heracles	2012–13	Eredivisie	18	3	2	0	—		20	3
Heracles	2013–14	Eredivisie	28	2	2	0	—		30	2
Heracles	2014–15	Eredivisie	24	0	3	0	—		27	0
Heracles	2015–16	Eredivisie	32	0	3	0	4 (Note: Appearances in Eredivisie playoffs)	0	39	0
Heracles	2016–17	Eredivisie	29	1	2	0	2 (Note: Appearances in the Europa League)	0	33	1
Heracles	Total		144	6	12	0	6	0	162	6
Groningen	2017–18	Eredivisie	33	1	2	0	0	0	35	1
Groningen	2018–19	Eredivisie	33	0	1	0	2	0	34	0
Groningen	2019–20	Eredivisie	23	1	1	0	0	0	24	1
Groningen	Total		89	2	4	0	2	0	95	2
Derby County	2020–21	Championship	4	0	0	0	2 (Note: Appearances in EFL Cup)	0	6	0
Career total			237	8	16	0	10	0	263	8
