= Django Warmerdam =

Dutch footballer (born 1995)

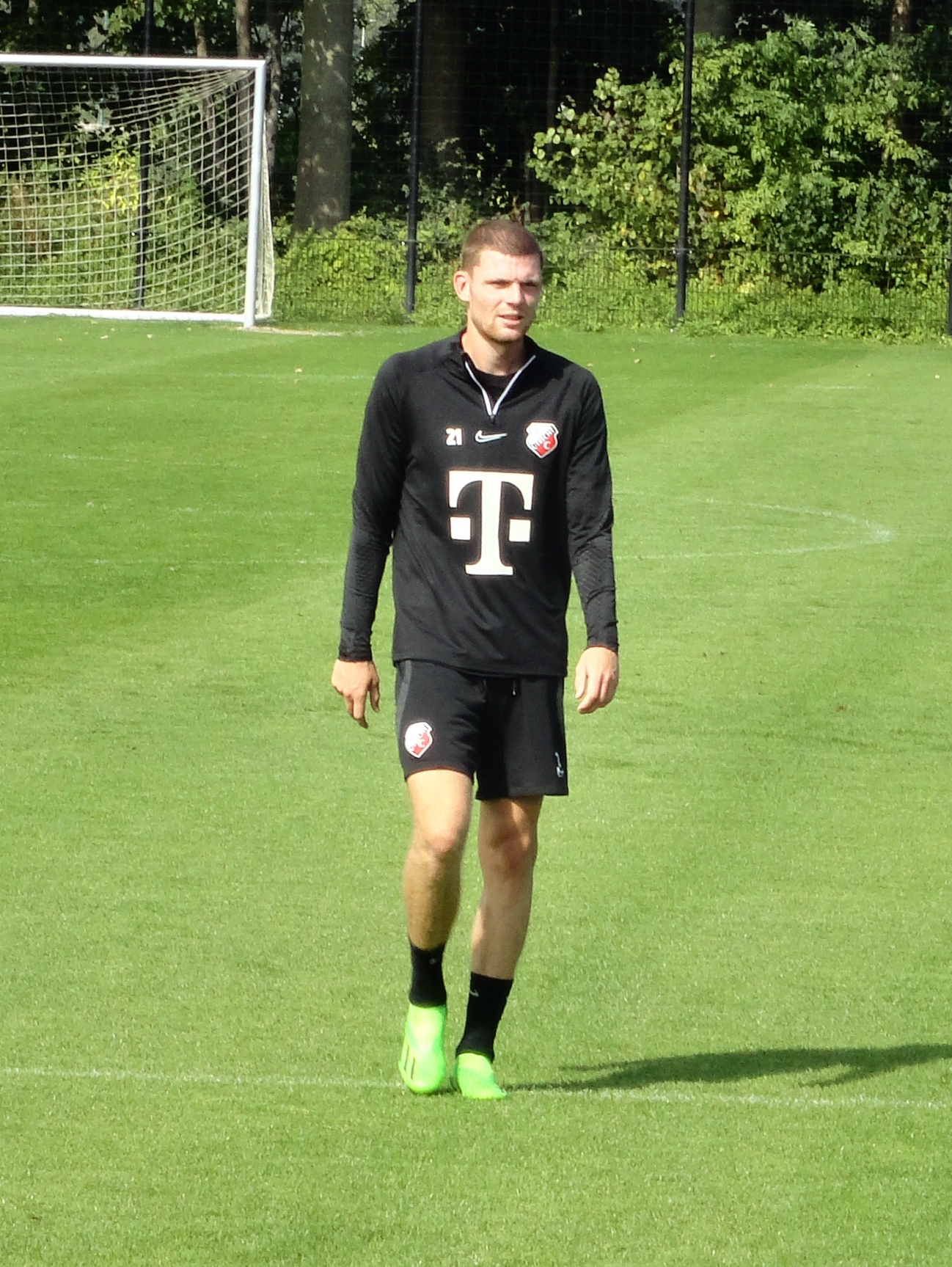
- Warmerdam with FC Utrecht in 2022

Personal information
- Date of birth: 2 September 1995 (age 31)
- Place of birth: Voorhout, Netherlands
- Height: 1.80 m (5 ft 11 in)
- Position: Left-back

Team information
- Current team: Katwijk
- Number: 5

Youth career
- 1999–2003: VV Foreholte
- 2003–2014: Ajax

Senior career*
Years	Team	Apps	(Gls)
2014–2017	Ajax	0	(0)
2014–2017	Jong Ajax	52	(2)
2016–2017	→ PEC Zwolle (loan)	26	(4)
2017–2020	Groningen	77	(4)
2020–2023	Utrecht	65	(1)
2023–2024	Sparta Rotterdam	15	(0)
2024–2025	Excelsior	31	(0)
2025–2026	Lyngby	3	(0)
2026–	Katwijk	5	(0)

International career^{‡}
2015	Netherlands U21	4	(0)
- * Club domestic league appearances and goals as of 18:21, 19 October 2026 (UTC) ‡ National team caps and goals as of 18:45, 24 June 2015 (UTC)

Django Warmerdam (born 2 September 1995) is a Dutch professional footballer who plays as a left-back for Tweede Divisie club Katwijk.

== Club career ==
Warmerdam is a youth exponent from AFC Ajax. He made his professional debut at 24 November 2014 against NEC Nijmegen replacing Robert van Koesveld after 81 minutes in a 1–1 draw. In 2017 he transferred to FC Groningen after a season long loan spell with PEC Zwolle.

After having spent three seasons with FC Groningen, Warmerdam moved to FC Utrecht on 3 February 2020 on a three-year contract, joining the club after the season.

On 11 May 2023, Warmerdam signed a two-year contract with Sparta Rotterdam.

In July 2024, Warmerdam joined Rotterdam rivals Excelsior on a two-year deal. On 29 August 2025, Warmerdam joined Danish 1st Division side Lyngby Boldklub on a 2-year deal.

On 28 August 2026, Warmerdam signed with Tweede Divisie club Katwijk after a successful trial.

== Personal life ==
Django's parents got the inspiration for his first name from the Belgian jazz guitarist Django Reinhardt.

== Career statistics ==
As of match played on 17 February 2024

Appearances and goals by club, season and competition
Club	Season	League			Cup		Europe		Other		Total	
Club	Season	Division	Apps	Goals	Apps	Goals	Apps	Goals	Apps	Goals	Apps	Goals
Jong Ajax	2014–15	Eerste Divisie	22	2	—		—		—		22	2
Jong Ajax	2015–16	Eerste Divisie	30	0	—		—		—		30	0
Jong Ajax	Total		52	2	0	0	—		—		52	2
PEC Zwolle (loan)	2016–17	Eredivisie	26	4	3	0	—		—		29	4
Groningen	2017–18	Eredivisie	30	1	2	0	—		—		32	1
Groningen	2018–19	Eredivisie	26	2	1	0	—		—		27	2
Groningen	2019–20	Eredivisie	21	1	1	0	—		—		22	1
Groningen	Total		77	4	4	0	—		—		81	4
FC Utrecht	2020–21	Eredivisie	33	0	2	0	—		—		35	0
FC Utrecht	2021–22	Eredivisie	26	1	1	0	—		0	0	27	1
FC Utrecht	2022–23	Eredivisie	6	0	1	0	—		—		7	0
FC Utrecht	Total		65	1	4	0	—		0	0	69	1
Sparta Rotterdam	2023–24	Eredivisie	15	0	2	0	—		—		17	0
Career totals			235	11	12	0	0	0	0	0	248	11

== Honours ==
Lyngby

- Danish 1st Division: 2025–26
