= Mimoun Mahi =

Footballer (born 1994)

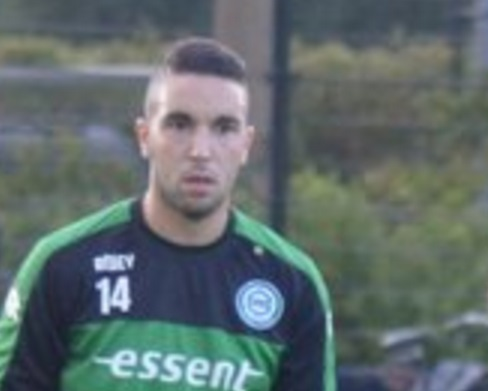
- Mahi with Groningen in 2015

Personal information
- Date of birth: 13 March 1994 (age 32)
- Place of birth: The Hague, Netherlands
- Height: 1.81 m (5 ft 11 in)
- Positions: Striker; winger

Youth career
- SC REMO
- HSV Escamp
- –2011: HV & CV Quick
- 2011–2012: Sparta Rotterdam

Senior career*
Years	Team	Apps	(Gls)
2012–2014	Sparta Rotterdam	32	(3)
2014–2019	Groningen	123	(37)
2016	Jong Groningen	1	(1)
2019–2020	Zürich	18	(2)
2020–2023	Utrecht	45	(11)
2023	→ Cambuur (loan)	12	(1)
2023–2025	De Graafschap	42	(8)
2026–	Scheveningen	13	(7)

International career
2012	Netherlands U18	1	(0)
2012–2013	Netherlands U19	8	(0)
2015	Netherlands U21	2	(0)
2017	Morocco	2	(1)
- * Club domestic league appearances and goals as of 15:01, 28 May 2026 (UTC)

Mimoun Mahi (born 13 March 1994) is a professional footballer who plays as a winger for Derde Divisie club Scheveningen. He formerly played for Sparta Rotterdam, Groningen, Zürich, Utrecht, Cambuur and De Graafschap. Born in the Netherlands, he represents Morocco at international level.

== Club career ==
=== Sparta Rotterdam ===
Mahi was born in The Hague and began his career as a footballer there with SC REMO, which he later left for HSV Escamp and then HV & CV Quick. In 2011, he moved to Sparta Rotterdam, where he was promoted to the first team a year later. He made his professional debut on 17 August 2012 in an away match against Den Bosch. In the 2–1 victory, he replaced Quenten Martinus late in the second half. He made 18 appearances that season, mostly as a substitute. On 16 May 2013, in the promotion playoffs, he scored his first goal for Sparta against Helmond Sport.

During a friendly match with Jong Utrecht on 12 August 2013, he suffered a serious knee injury to his meniscus. He underwent surgery and was ruled out for six months. He made his comeback against Excelsior Maassluis in the KNVB Cup on 11 January 2014. In the 21 matches that followed, he scored six goals and provided three assists. He started the 2014–15 season with Sparta in the Eerste Divisie, while attracting interest from Eredivisie clubs. He ended his time at Sparta with seven goals and four assists in 41 matches.

=== Groningen ===
On 22 August 2011, Mahi signed a three-year contract with an option for two additional years with Eredivisie club Groningen. On 24 August, he made his debut for Groningen against his hometown club ADO Den Haag in a 3–0 defeat. His first goal for the club came on 17 December in a cup match against Volendam, where he also provided an assist. On 22 March 2015, he scored his first Eredivisie goal against Twente in a 2–2 draw. He started as a left winger for Groningen in the 2015 KNVB Cup final against defending cup winners PEC Zwolle on 3 May. Groningen won the match 2–0, marking their first-ever major trophy win and securing qualification to the UEFA Europa League for the following season. However, Mahi played little in the 2015–16 season due to three different injuries to his thigh, calf, and knee in succession. Despite this, he managed impressive statistics, scoring five times in the first ten matches of the season.

The 2016–17 season saw Mahi in top form, deployed more as a striker than a winger, resulting in a significant increase in goals. Between 5 April and 7 May 2016, he scored a total of seven goals in five consecutive matches, finishing sixth on the Eredivisie top scorers list with seventeen goals.

The following season also started well for Mahi with a brace in the season opener against local rivals Heerenveen in a 3–3 draw. However, in October 2017, Groningen temporarily removed Mahi and Oussama Idrissi from the squad due to unacceptable behavior. Nine days later, they returned to the first team. Mahi remained an important player for Groningen that season with seven goals and six assists in the Eredivisie. He maintained exactly the same statistics in his final season at Groningen. In five seasons, Mahi played 138 matches for Groningen, scoring 39 goals and providing nineteen assists.

=== FC Zürich ===
In February 2019, Swiss Super League side FC Zürich announced Mahi would join the club from Groningen in summer 2019 having agreed a three-year contract. He made his debut for the club on 21 July, replacing Salim Khelifi during half-time in a 4–0 home loss against FC Lugano.

For Zürich, Mahi played in 18 out of 36 possible league games and one cup game that season. However, from the end of June 2020 until the COVID-19 delayed season's conclusion in early August 2020, he was sidelined due to an injury.

=== Utrecht ===
After one year in Switzerland, Mahi returned to the Netherlands, where he signed a four-year contract with FC Utrecht.

On 17 January 2023, Mahi joined Cambuur on loan for the rest of the season.

=== De Graafschap ===
On 10 August 2023, Mahi signed a three-year contract with De Graafschap. On 6 August 2025, the contract was mutually terminated.

=== Scheveningen ===
After about half a year of remaining without a club Mahi signed for third division tier club SVV Scheveningen.

== International career ==
Mahi was born in The Hague to parents of Moroccan descent. He has represented the Royal Dutch Football Association at various youth levels.

Mahi made his debut for the Morocco national team in a 6–0 2018 FIFA World Cup qualification win over Mali on 1 September 2017, wherein he also scored his debut goal.

== Career statistics ==
=== Club ===
As of match played on 1 November 2024

Appearances and goals by club, season and competition
Club	Season	League			National cup		Europe		Other		Total	
Club	Season	Division	Apps	Goals	Apps	Goals	Apps	Goals	Apps	Goals	Apps	Goals
Sparta Rotterdam	2012–13	Eerste Divisie	15	0	0	0	—		3 (Note: Appearances in the Eerste Divisie promotion play-offs)	1	18	1
Sparta Rotterdam	2013–14	Eerste Divisie	15	3	0	0	—		6	3	21	6
Sparta Rotterdam	2014–15	Eerste Divisie	2	0	0	0	—		0	0	2	0
Sparta Rotterdam	Total		32	3	0	0	—		9	4	41	7
Groningen	2014–15	Eredivisie	26	1	5	1	—		0	0	31	2
Groningen	2015–16	Eredivisie	13	5	1	0	3 (Note: Appearance in the Europa League)	0	1 (Note: Appearance in the Johan Cruyff Shield)	0	18	5
Groningen	2016–17	Eredivisie	32	17	2	0	—		0	0	34	17
Groningen	2017–18	Eredivisie	26	7	1	0	—		0	0	27	7
Groningen	2018–19	Eredivisie	26	7	0	0	—		2 (Note: Appearance(s) in the Eredivisie European play-offs)	1	28	8
Groningen	Total		123	37	9	1	3	0	3	1	138	39
Zürich	2019–20	Swiss Super League	18	2	1	1	—		—		19	3
Utrecht	2020–21	Eredivisie	22	7	1	2	—		2	0	25	9
Utrecht	2021–22	Eredivisie	21	4	1	0	—		1	0	23	4
Utrecht	2022–23	Eredivisie	2	0	—		—		—		2	0
Utrecht	Total		45	11	2	2	—		3	0	50	13
Cambuur (loan)	2022–23	Eredivisie	12	1	0	0	—		—		12	1
De Graafschap	2023–24	Eerste Divisie	22	3	1	0	—		2	0	25	3
De Graafschap	2024–25	Eerste Divisie	12	3	1	0	—		—		13	3
De Graafschap	Total		34	6	2	0	—		2	0	38	6
Career total			264	60	14	4	3	0	17	5	298	69

=== International ===
Scores and results list Morocco's goal tally first, score column indicates score after each Mahi goal.

List of international goals scored by Mimoun Mahi
No.	Date	Venue	Opponent	Score	Result	Competition
1	1 September 2017	Prince Moulay Abdellah Stadium, Rabat, Morocco	Mali	6–0	6–0	2018 FIFA World Cup qualification

== Honours ==
Groningen

- KNVB Cup: 2014–15
