= Jesper Drost =

Dutch footballer (born 1993)

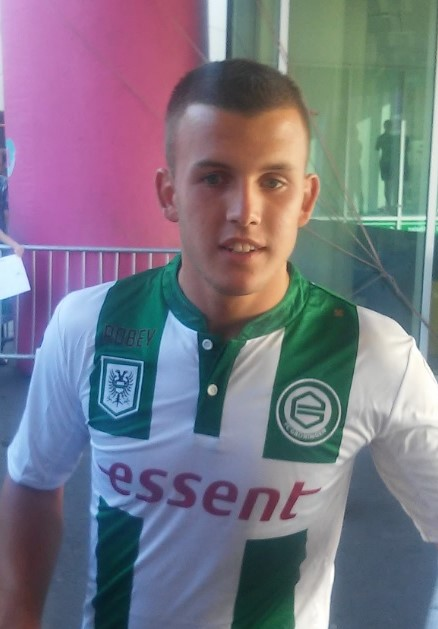
- Drost with FC Groningen

Personal information
- Date of birth: 11 January 1993 (age 33)
- Place of birth: Nunspeet, Netherlands
- Height: 1.75 m (5 ft 9 in)
- Position: Attacking midfielder

Team information
- Current team: Berkum
- Number: 11

Youth career
- Nunspeet
- FC Zwolle

Senior career*
Years	Team	Apps	(Gls)
2010–2015	PEC Zwolle	106	(15)
2015–2018	Groningen	76	(5)
2016	Jong Groningen	3	(2)
2018–2020	Heracles	21	(2)
2020–2021	PEC Zwolle	24	(2)
2021–2025	HHC	88	(29)
2025–	Berkum		

International career
2007–2008	Netherlands U15	4	(2)
2009–2010	Netherlands U17	7	(1)
2010–2011	Netherlands U18	6	(1)
2013	Netherlands U20	1	(0)
2013–2014	Netherlands U21	2	(1)
- * Club domestic league appearances and goals as of 14:39, 23 October 2024 (UTC)

Jesper Drost (born 11 January 1993) is a Dutch footballer who plays as an attacking midfielder or winger for VV Berkum.

== Club career ==
Drost was born in Nunspeet. He joined FC Groningen from PEC Zwolle in summer 2015. He then moved to Heracles Almelo and back to PEC Zwolle.

On 31 August 2021, he moved to the third-tier club HHC Hardenberg and four years later he joined fellow amateur club Berkum combining this with his work as a padel coach in Zwolle.

== Personal life ==
Drost was accused of attempted manslaughter, after he allegedly drove into two men with his car after a fight in a bar in Steenwijk in 2014. In December 2015 he was sentenced to do 50 hours of community service.

== Career statistics ==
=== Club ===
As of match played 29 June 2018

Appearances and goals by club, season and competition
Club	Season	League			KNVB Cup		Europe		Other		Total	
Club	Season	Division	Apps	Goals	Apps	Goals	Apps	Goals	Apps	Goals	Apps	Goals
PEC Zwolle	2010–11	Eerste Divisie	4	0	0	0	–		1 (Note: Appearance in the Eerste Divisie play-offs)	0	5	0
PEC Zwolle	2011–12	Eerste Divisie	19	3	1	0	–		0	0	20	3
PEC Zwolle	2012–13	Eredivisie	26	1	3	1	–		0	0	29	2
PEC Zwolle	2013–14	Eredivisie	24	3	4	1	–		0	0	28	4
PEC Zwolle	2014–15	Eredivisie	33	8	6	2	2 (Note: Appearances in the Europa League)	0	3 (Note: Appearances in the Eredivisie Europa League playoffs) (Note: Appearances in the Johan Cruyff Shield)	0	44	10
PEC Zwolle	Total		106	15	14	4	2	0	4	0	126	19
Groningen	2015–16	Eredivisie	29	1	1	1	3	0	3	0	36	2
Groningen	2016–17	Eredivisie	17	1	0	0	–		2	1	19	2
Groningen	2017–18	Eredivisie	30	3	1	0	–		0	0	31	3
Groningen	Total		76	5	2	1	3	0	5	1	86	7
Career total			182	20	16	5	5	0	9	1	212	26

== Honours ==
PEC Zwolle

- KNVB Cup: 2013–14; runner-up 2014–15
- Johan Cruijff Shield: 2014
- Eerste Divisie: 2011–12
