= 2016–17 ADO Den Haag season =

ADO Den Haag
2016–17 season
- Chairman: Henk Jagersma
- Manager: Zeljko Petrovic sacked 7 February 2017; Alfons Groenendijk
- Stadium: Kyocera Stadion
- Eredivisie: 11th
- KNVB Cup: 1/8 Final
- Top goalscorer: League: Mike Havenaar (9); All: Mike Havenaar (10)
- Highest home attendance: 13.764 vs Ajax
- Lowest home attendance: 8.956 vs FC Utrecht
- Average home league attendance: 11.370
Home colours	Away colours

Alles Door Oefening Den Haag (Dutch pronunciation: [ˈɑləs doːr ˈufənɪŋ dɛn ˈɦaːx]), commonly known by the abbreviated name ADO Den Haag [ˈaːdoː dɛn ˈɦaːx], is a Dutch association football club from the city of The Hague. During the 2015–16 campaign they competed in the Eredivisie and KNVB Beker competitions.

== Eredivisie ==
=== League table ===
Pos	Team	Pld	W	D	L	GF	GA	GD	Pts	Qualification or relegation
9	Heerenveen	34	12	7	15	54	53	+1	43	Qualification for the European competition play-offs (Note: Four teams played for a spot in the Europa League second qualifying round.)
10	Heracles Almelo	34	12	7	15	53	55	−2	43	
11	ADO Den Haag	34	11	5	18	37	59	−22	38	
12	Excelsior	34	9	10	15	43	60	−17	37	
13	Willem II	34	9	9	16	29	44	−15	36	

Source: NUsport (in Dutch), Soccerway
Rules for classification: 1) Points; 2) Goal difference; 3) Goals scored; 4) Play-off (only for deciding champion and relegation); 5) Head-to-head points; 6) Head-to-head goal difference; 7) Head-to-head away goals scored; 8) Draw. (Note: Criteria 5-8 is only used if deciding Europa League play-off places)

==== Results summary ====
Overall								Home						Away					
Pld	W	D	L	GF	GA	GD	Pts	W	D	L	GF	GA	GD	W	D	L	GF	GA	GD
34	11	5	18	37	59	−22	38	7	3	7	22	21	+1	4	2	11	15	38	−23

Last updated: 19 June 2017.
Source: Eredivisie

==== Results by matchday ====
Matchday	1	2	3	4	5	6	7	8	9	10	11	12	13	14	15	16	17	18	19	20	21	22	23	24	25	26	27	28	29	30	31	32	33	34
Ground	H	A	A	H	A	A	H	A	H	A	H	H	A	A	H	A	H	A	H	A	H	A	H	H	A	H	A	H	A	H	H	A	A	H
Result	W	W	W	D	L	L	L	L	L	D	L	W	L	L	L	L	W	L	L	L	L	L	L	D	D	W	L	W	W	W	D	W	L	W
Position	3	2	3	3	5	9	10	9	10	10	11	10	11	15	15	15	14	14	15	15	16	18	18	18	18	17	17	16	15	13	12	12	14	11

Updated to match(es) played on 19 June 2017. Source: ADO Den Haag
A = Away; H = Home; W = Win; D = Draw; L = Loss

=== League matches ===
6 August 2016 1	ADO Den Haag	3–0	Go Ahead Eagles	The Hague
18:30 CET	Havenaar 16' (pen.), 70' (yellow card) 34'; Ebuehi 82'	Report	(yellow card) 15' Duits	Stadium: Kyocera Stadion; Attendance: 10.168; Referee: Higler

13 August 2016 2	Vitesse Arnhem	1–2	ADO Den Haag	Arnhem
19:45 CET	van Wolfswinkel 22'; Kruiswijk (yellow card) 90'	Report	31', 61' Kastaneer; (yellow card) 59' Duplan	Stadium: GelreDome; Attendance: 11.615; Referee: Blom

19 August 2016 3	Excelsior	1–2	ADO Den Haag	Rotterdam
20:00 CET	Mattheij 8'; Bruins (yellow card) 22'; Vermeulen (yellow card) 36'; Drost (yellow card) 82'	Report	25' (yellow card) 39' Kastaneer; 68' Beugelsdijk; (yellow card) 74' Trybull; (yellow card) 82' Meißner	Stadium: Stadion Woudestein; Attendance: 4.123; Referee: Nijhuis

28 August 2016 4	ADO Den Haag	1–1	Heracles Almelo	The Hague
14:30 CET	Havenaar 28'; Duplan (yellow card) 38'; Meijers (yellow card) 54'	Report	18' Gosens; (yellow card) 57' Darri	Stadium: Kyocera Stadion; Attendance: 11.016; Referee: Higler

11 September 2016 5	Feyenoord	3–1	ADO Den Haag	Rotterdam
12:30 CET	Kuyt 33'; Jørgensen 34'; Vilhena (yellow card) 72'; El Ahmadi 90'	Report	(yellow card) 48' Meijers; (yellow card) 58' Beugelsdijk; (yellow card) 64' Kastaneer; 86' Marengo	Stadium: Stadion Feijenoord; Attendance: 47.500; Referee: Gozubuyuk

17 September 2016 6	FC Twente	4–1	ADO Den Haag	Enschede
18:30 CET	Ünal 13', 35' van der Lely (yellow card) 41'; Celina 54'; Mokotjo 90'	Report	(yellow card) 20' Becker; (yellow card) 61' Meißner; 88' Jansen	Stadium: Grolsch Veste; Attendance: 24.100; Referee: van Boekel

24 September 2016 7	ADO Den Haag	0–3	SC Heerenveen	The Hague
18:30 CET	San Roman (yellow card) 24'; Kanon (yellow card) 33'	Report	26' (Own goal) Kanon; (yellow card) 36' Marzo; 79' Zeneli; 88' Veerman	Stadium: Kyocera Stadion; Attendance: 10.572; Referee: Wiedemeijer

30 September 2016 8	PEC Zwolle	2–1	ADO Den Haag	Zwolle
20:00 CET	van de Pavert (yellow card) 20'; Mokhtar 51', 70'	Report	(yellow card) 28' Beugelsdijk; 47' (yellow card) 81' (yellow-red card) Trybull; (yellow card) 66' Bakker; (yellow card) 66' Duplan; (yellow card) 79' Kanon	Stadium: MAC³PARK Stadion; Attendance: 12.400; Referee: Kuipers

16 October 2016 9	ADO Den Haag	0–2	Ajax	The Hague
16:45 CET	Jansen (yellow card) 33'	Report	20' Klaassen; 52' Traoré	Stadium: Kyocera Stadion; Attendance: 13.764; Referee: Blom

22 October 2016 10	Roda JC Kerkrade	1–1	ADO Den Haag	Kerkrade
19:45 CET	Paulissen 86'; Werker (yellow card) 88'	Report	(yellow card) 14' Jansen; 37' (yellow card) 90' Duplan; (yellow card) 47' Bakker; (yellow card) 74' Ebuehi; (yellow card) 85' Meißner	Stadium: Parkstad Limburg Stadion; Attendance: 16.178; Referee: Janssen

30 October 2016 11	ADO Den Haag	0–1	AZ Alkmaar	The Hague
16:45 CET	Meißner (yellow card) 17'; Marengo (yellow card) 39'; Bakker (yellow card) 77'	Report	(yellow card) 18' van Eijden; 87' Mühren	Stadium: Kyocera Stadion; Attendance: 11.023; Referee: Jochem Kamphuis

5 November 2016 12	ADO Den Haag	1–0	Willem II	The Hague
18:30 CET	Jansen (yellow card) 27'; Beugelsdijk 56' (yellow card) 80'; Havenaar (yellow card) 60'; San Roman (yellow card) 75'	Report	(yellow card) 45' Ojo	Stadium: Kyocera Stadion; Attendance: 10.044; Referee: Mulder

19 November 2016 13	FC Groningen	2–1	ADO Den Haag	Groningen
20:45 CET	Hateboer 10' van Weert 54'	Report	42' (yellow card) 71' Duplan	Stadium: Noordlease Stadion; Attendance: 17.818; Referee: Blom

26 November 2016 14	PSV Eindhoven	3–1	ADO Den Haag	Eindhoven
19:45 CET	Pereiro 12' (pen.); Beugelsdijk 50' (Own goal) de Jong 55'; Zoet (yellow card) 57'	Report	57' (pen.) Beugelsdijk	Stadium: Philips Stadion; Attendance: 32.700; Referee: Kuipers

4 December 2016 15	ADO Den Haag	0–2	FC Utrecht	The Hague
12:30 CET	Kastaneer (yellow card) 14'; Hevel (yellow card) 41'; Meißner (yellow card) 63'; Beugelsdijk (yellow card) 75' (yellow-red card)	Report	29' Barazite; (yellow card) 80' Troupée; 83' Haller	Stadium: Kyocera Stadion; Attendance: 8.956; Referee: van Boekel

10 December 2016 16	NEC Nijmegen	3–0	ADO Den Haag	Nijmegen
18:30 CET	Mayi 10'; Ebuehi 12' (Own goal); Rayhi 44'	Report	(yellow card) 12' El Mahdioui	Stadium: De Goffert; Attendance: 11.200; Referee: Jochem Kamphuis

18 December 2016 17	ADO Den Haag	1–0	Sparta Rotterdam	The Hague
14:30 CET	Becker 57'; Hevel (yellow card) 79' (yellow-red card)	Report	(yellow card) 49' Floranus; (yellow card) 87' Chevreuil; (yellow card) 90' Brogno	Stadium: Kyocera Stadion; Attendance: 12.691; Referee: Blom

14 January 2017 18	SC Heerenveen	2–0	ADO Den Haag	Heerenveen
18:30 CET	van Amersfoort (yellow card) 35'; Ghoochannejhad 63', 64'	Report	(yellow card) 61' David; (yellow card) 80' Bakker	Stadium: Abe Lenstra Stadion; Attendance: 20.400; Referee: Jochem Kamphuis

21 January 2017 19	ADO Den Haag	1–2	PEC Zwolle	The Hague
19:45 CET	Kastaneer 10'; El Mahdioui (yellow card) 8'; Meißner (yellow card) 71'; Duplan (yellow card) 90'	Report	(yellow card) 23' Holla; 38' Ehizibue; (yellow card) 54' van de Pavert; 56' Brock-Madsen; (yellow card) 85' Marcellis	Stadium: Kyocera Stadion; Attendance: 9.130; Referee: Bax

29 January 2017 20	Ajax	3–0	ADO Den Haag	Amsterdam
14:30 CET	Ziyech 11'; Schöne 34'; Dolberg 76'	Report	(yellow card) 64'Beugelsdijk; (yellow card) 83' Šetkus	Stadium: Amsterdam ArenA; Attendance: 49.552; Referee: Nijhuis

3 February 2017 21	ADO Den Haag	0–2	Vitesse Arnhem	The Hague
20:00 CET	Wolters (yellow card) 52'; Gorter (yellow card) 61'; Kanon (yellow card) 89'	Report	29' Tighadouini; 31' van Wolfswinkel	Stadium: Kyocera Stadion; Attendance: 11.343; Referee: Mulder

11 February 2017 22	Go Ahead Eagles	3–1	ADO Den Haag	Deventer
19:45 CET	Hendriks 38', 57'; Achenteh (yellow card) 85'; Ritzmaier 90'	Report	(yellow card) 44' Kanon; (red card) 73' Šetkus	Stadium: De Adelaarshorst; Attendance: 9.647; Referee: Janssen

19 February 2017 23	ADO Den Haag	0–1	Feyenoord	The Hague
16:45 CET	Schaken (yellow card) 86'	Report	(yellow card) 37' Toornstra; (yellow card) 45' Berghuis; 62' El Ahmadi	Stadium: Kyocera Stadion; Attendance: 12.822; Referee: Kuipers

24 February 2017 24	ADO Den Haag	1–1	FC Twente	The Hague
20:00 CET	Schaken 12'; Duplan (yellow card) 46'	Report	26' Ünal; (yellow card) 56' Andersen	Stadium: Kyocera Stadion; Attendance: 11.615; Referee: Blom

5 March 2017 25	FC Utrecht	1–1	ADO Den Haag	Utrecht
14:30 CET	Janssen (yellow card) 36'; Zivkovic 40'; Kerk (yellow card) 62'	Report	16' Malone; (yellow card) 33' Kanon; (yellow card) 35' Fernandez; (yellow card) 54' Meijers; (yellow card) 59' Ebuehi	Stadium: Stadion Galgenwaard; Attendance: 17.712; Referee: Gözübüyük

11 March 2017 26	ADO Den Haag	1–0	NEC Nijmegen	The Hague
18:30 CET	Bakker (yellow card) 25'; Ebuehi (yellow card) 63'; Havenaar 72'; Zwinkels (yellow card) 90'	Report	(yellow card) 44' Breinburg; (yellow card) 79' Kadioglu; (yellow card) 90' Rayhi	Stadium: Kyocera Stadion; Attendance: 10.256; Referee: Nijhuis

19 March 2017 27	AZ Alkmaar	4–0	ADO Den Haag	Alkmaar
16:45 CET	dos Santos 7', 13'; Luckassen (yellow card) 20' van Overeem 34' (yellow card) 79'; Svensson (yellow card) 36'; Friday 60'; Wuytens (yellow card) 80'	Report	(yellow card) 64' Ebuehi	Stadium: AFAS Stadion; Attendance: 14.126; Referee: Janssen

2 April 2017 28	ADO Den Haag	4–1	Roda JC Kerkrade	The Hague
14:30 CET	Becker 1' (yellow card) 56'; El Khayati 28' (pen.); Havenaar 62'; Fernandez 87'	Report	(yellow card) 25' Gnjatić; (yellow card) 31' (goal) 89' El Makrini; (yellow card) 44' Milec; (yellow card) 52' Auassar	Stadium: Kyocera Stadion; Attendance: 11.740; Referee: Higler

5 April 2017 29	Willem II	1–2	ADO Den Haag	Tilburg
20:45 CET	Oularé 25'; Haye (yellow card) 59'	Report	21' El Khayati; 42' Havenaar; (yellow card) 90' Becker	Stadium: Koning Willem II Stadion; Attendance: 12.800; Referee: Mulder

8 April 2017 30	ADO Den Haag	4–3	FC Groningen	The Hague
19:45 CET	Bakker 13'; Malone 21', 47'; Havenaar 23' (yellow card) 79'; Kanon (yellow card) 73'	Report	51' (pen.) Mahi; 64', 90' Linssen; (yellow card) 86' Bacuna	Stadium: Kyocera Stadion; Attendance: 11.348; Referee: Manschot

15 April 2017 31	ADO Den Haag	1–1	PSV Eindhoven	The Hague
19:45 CET	Meißner (yellow card) 80'; Havenaar 87'	Report	7' Pröpper; (yellow card) 55' Pereiro	Stadium: Kyocera Stadion; Attendance: 13.094; Referee: Nijhuis

23 April 2017 32	Sparta Rotterdam	0–1	ADO Den Haag	Rotterdam
14:30 CET	Pusic (yellow card) 69'	Report	10' El Khayati	Stadium: Het Kasteel; Attendance: 10.606; Referee: Higler

7 May 2017 33	Heracles Almelo	4–0	ADO Den Haag	Almelo
14:30 CET	Niemeijer 5', 12'; Armenteros 71'; Bruns 90'	Report	(yellow card) 66' Meißner	Stadium: Polman Stadion; Attendance: 11.733; Referee: Gözübüyük

14 May 2017 34	ADO Den Haag	4–1	Excelsior	The Hague
14:30 CET	Becker 8'; Havenaar 25'; El Khayati 33'; Kanon 65'	Report	20' Fortes	Stadium: Kyocera Stadion; Attendance: 13.257; Referee: Mulder

== KNVB Cup ==
21 September 2016 1st round	NEC Nijmegen	1–1 (a.e.t.) (3–5 p)	ADO Den Haag	Nijmegen
20:00 Central European Time	Đumić (yellow card) 90' von Haacke (yellow card) 97'; Breinburg 105' (pen.)	Report	(yellow card) 84' Beugelsdijk; (yellow card) 93' Schaken; 114' Kastaneer	Stadium: De Goffert; Attendance: 4.005; Referee: Mulder
	Penalties
	Đumić (penalty scored); Golla (penalty scored); Fomitschow (penalty missed) von Haacke (penalty scored)		(penalty scored) Beugelsdijk; (penalty scored) El Mahdioui; (penalty scored) Bakker; (penalty scored) Becker; (penalty scored) Schaken

25 October 2016 2nd round	ADO Den Haag	2–1	Telstar	The Hague
20:00 Central European Time	Marengo (yellow card) 53'; Havenaar 73' van der Heijden 81'	Report	(yellow card) 16' Džepar; 39' (yellow card) 90' Mahmudov	Stadium: Kyocera Stadion; Attendance: 5.106; Referee: Liesveld

14 December 2016 1/8 Final	Feyenoord	5–1	ADO Den Haag	Rotterdam
20:45 Central European Time	Jørgensen 34'; Kuyt 50' (pen.), 63', 79' (pen.); El Ahmadi 68'; Vilhena (yellow card) 73'	Report	(yellow card) 49' Meißner; (yellow card) 79' Zwinkels; (yellow card) 81' Ebuehi; 87' Kastaneer	Stadium: Stadion Feijenoord; Attendance: 32.500; Referee: Janssen

== Player details ==
No.	Pos	Nat	Player	Total		Eredivisie		KNVB Cup	
No.	Pos	Nat	Player	Apps	Goals	Apps	Goals	Apps	Goals
1	GK	(Lithuania) LTU	Ernestas Šetkus	22	0	22	0	0	0
2	DF	(Netherlands) NED	Dion Malone	13	3	13	3	0	0
3	DF	(Germany) GER	Thomas Meißner	30	0	28	0	2	0
4	DF	(Netherlands) NED	Tom Beugelsdijk	31	3	28	3	3	0
5	DF	(Ivory Coast) CIV	Wilfried Kanon	30	1	28	1	2	0
6	MF	(Netherlands) NED	Aschraf El Mahdioui	16	0	13	0	3	0
7	MF	(Netherlands) NED	Kevin Jansen	12	1	11	1	1	0
8	MF	(Netherlands) NED	Aaron Meijers	20	0	19	0	1	0
9	FW	(Japan) JPN	Mike Havenaar	30	10	28	9	2	1
11	FW	(Netherlands) NED	Randy Wolters	12	0	12	0	0	0
11	FW	(Netherlands) NED	Ludcinio Marengo	15	1	14	1	1	0
12	MF	(Germany) GER	Tom Trybull	26	1	23	1	3	0
13	DF	(Argentina) ARG	Jose San Roman	12	3	12	3	0	0
14	MF	(Netherlands) NED	Donny Gorter	10	0	10	0	0	0
15	DF	(Netherlands) NED	Abel Tamata	0	0	0	0	0	0
17	MF	(Netherlands) NED	Danny Bakker	21	1	19	1	2	0
18	GK	(Netherlands) NED	Jurrian Jouvenaar	0	0	0	0	0	0
18	GK	(Netherlands) NED	Tim Coremans	0	0	0	0	0	0
19	FW	(Netherlands) NED	Guyon Fernandez	13	1	13	1	0	0
19	FW	(Netherlands) NED	Dennis van der Heijden	17	1	16	0	1	1
20	FW	(Netherlands) NED	Ruben Schaken	27	1	25	1	2	0
21	FW	(France) FRA	Edouard Duplan	36	2	33	2	3	0
22	GK	(Netherlands) NED	Robert Zwinkels	15	0	12	0	3	0
23	MF	(Netherlands) NED	Abdenasser El Khayati	12	5	12	5	0	0
23	MF	(Netherlands) NED	Hector Hevel	8	0	6	0	2	0
24	GK	(Netherlands) NED	Rody de Boer	0	0	0	0	0	0
25	DF	(Netherlands) NED	Mohamed Haddachi	0	0	0	0	0	0
27	DF	(Netherlands) NED	Trevor David	3	0	3	0	0	0
28	DF	(Netherlands) NED	Tyronne Ebuehi	31	1	29	1	2	0
30	FW	(Netherlands) NED	Jerdy Schouten	3	0	2	0	1	0
31	FW	(Netherlands) NED	Chovanie Amatkarijo	1	0	1	0	0	0
32	DF	(Netherlands) NED	Henk van Schaik	0	0	0	0	0	0
33	FW	(Netherlands) NED	Gervane Kastaneer	16	6	14	4	2	2
34	DF	(Netherlands) NED	Hennos Asmelash	2	0	2	0	0	0
77	FW	(Netherlands) NED	Sheraldo Becker	31	3	28	3	3	0

Sources: Squad numbers, Eredivisie en KNVB Cup stats,

== Transfers ==
In: Note: Flags indicate national team as defined under FIFA eligibility rules; some limited exceptions apply. Players may hold more than one non-FIFA nationality.

No.	Pos.	Nation	Player
1	GK	LTU	Ernestas Šetkus (from (Turkey) Sivasspor)
3	DF	GER	Thomas Meißner (from (Germany) MSV Duisburg)
6	MF	NED	Aschraf El Mahdioui (from (Netherlands) Jong Ajax)
11	FW	NED	Randy Wolters (on loan from (England) Go Ahead Eagles)
12	MF	GER	Tom Trybull (from (Germany) SpVgg Greuther Fürth)
13	DF	NED	Jose San Roman (from (Argentina) Club Atletico Huracan)
14	MF	NED	Donny Gorter (from (Denmark) Viborg FF)
15	DF	NED	Abel Tamata (no club)
19	FW	NED	Guyon Fernandez (no club)
23	MF	NED	Abdenasser El Khayati (on loan from (England) Queens Park Rangers F.C.)
77	FW	NED	Sheraldo Becker (from (Netherlands) Ajax)

Out: Note: Flags indicate national team as defined under FIFA eligibility rules; some limited exceptions apply. Players may hold more than one non-FIFA nationality.

No.	Pos.	Nation	Player
—	GK	DEN	Martin Hansen (to (Germany) FC Ingolstadt 04)
—	DF	ARG	Jose San Roman (to (Argentina) Club Atlético Newell's Old Boys)
—	DF	BEL	Timothy Derijck (to (Belgium) SV Zulte-Waregem)
—	FW	NED	Giovanni Korte (to (Netherlands) NAC Breda)
—	MF	DEN	Thomas Kristensen (to (Australia) Brisbane Roar FC)
—	DF	NED	Vito Wormgoor (to (Norway) Aalesunds FK)
—	DF	NED	Gianni Zuiverloon (to (Spain) Cultural Leonesa)
—	DF	NED	Robin Buwalda (to (Netherlands) NEC Nijmegen)
—	MF	NED	Hector Hevel (to (Cyprus) AEK Larnaca FC)
—	FW	NED	Dennis van der Heijden (on loan to (Netherlands) FC Volendam)
—	FW	NED	Ludcinio Marengo (on loan to (Netherlands) Go Ahead Eagles)
—	GK	NED	Tim Coremans (on loan to (Netherlands) FC Dordrecht)
—	DF	NED	Dylan Nieuwenhuijs (no club)
—	MF	DEN	Mathias Gehrt (to (Denmark) FC Helsingør)

Sources: Transfers 2016–17
