= 2015–16 ADO Den Haag season =

ADO Den Haag
2015–16 season
- Chairman: Henk Jagersma
- Manager: Henk Fraser
- Stadium: Kyocera Stadion
- Eredivisie: 11th
- KNVB Cup: 2nd round
- Top goalscorer: League: Mike Havenaar (16); All: Mike Havenaar (17)
- Highest home attendance: 14.561 Ajax
- Lowest home attendance: 10.071 Heracles Almelo
- Average home league attendance: 12.027
Home colours	Away colours

Alles Door Oefening Den Haag (Dutch pronunciation: [ˈɑləs doːr ˈufənɪŋ dɛn ˈɦaːx]), commonly known by the abbreviated name ADO Den Haag [ˈaːdoː dɛn ˈɦaːx], is a Dutch [association football] club from the city of The Hague. During the 2015–16 campaign they competed in the Eredivisie and KNVB Beker competitions.

== Competitions ==
=== Eredivisie ===
==== League table ====
Pos	Team	Pld	W	D	L	GF	GA	GD	Pts
9	Vitesse	34	12	10	12	55	38	+17	46
10	NEC	34	13	7	14	37	42	−5	46
11	ADO Den Haag	34	10	13	11	48	49	−1	43
12	Heerenveen	34	11	9	14	46	61	−15	42
13	Twente (Note: Twente were deducted three points for breaking the financial standards set by the Royal Dutch Football Association. In May 2016 Twente had their licence for the Eredivisie revoked by KNVB and was relegated to the Eerste Divisie, but they successfully appealed this decision and stayed in the league.)	34	12	7	15	49	64	−15	40

Source: Eredivisie, NUsport, Soccerway
Rules for classification: 1) Points; 2) Goal difference; 3) Goals scored; 4) Head-to-head points; 5) Head-to-head goal difference; 6) Head-to-head away goals scored; 7) Play-off (only if deciding champion, European competitions, or relegation); 8) Draw.

==== Results by matchday ====
Matchday	1	2	3	4	5	6	7	8	9	10	11	12	13	14	15	16	17	18	19	20	21	22	23	24	25	26	27	28	29	30	31	32	33	34
Ground	H	A	H	A	H	A	H	A	H	A	H	A	H	A	A	H	A	H	H	A	A	H	A	H	A	H	A	H	H	A	A	H	A	H
Result	D	W	D	L	L	L	D	L	D	D	W	D	D	L	W	W	W	L	W	L	W	D	W	L	L	W	D	W	L	D	W	L	D	D
Position	6	3	6	11	12	12	13	15	13	13	13	14	14	14	13	12	10	11	11	12	12	12	11	11	12	11	10	10	10	12	10	11	11	11

A = Away; H = Home; W = Win; D = Draw; L = Loss

==== Matches ====
These are the matches scheduled for ADO Den Haag in the 2015–2016 Eredivisie season.

11 August 2015 Match 1	ADO Den Haag	2–2	PSV	The Hague
18:30 CET	Alberg 25' (pen.); Schaken (yellow card) 45+1'; Meijers (yellow card) 70'; Wormgoor (yellow card) 86'; Hansen 90+5'; Bakker (yellow card) 90+6'	Summary	Maher 23'; Arias (yellow card) 24'; Lestienne (yellow card) 40' de Jong 62'	Stadium: Kyocera Stadion; Attendance: 13,125; Referee: (Netherlands) Richard Liesveld

15 August 2015 Match 2	Twente	1–4	ADO Den Haag	Enschede
19:45 CET	Da Cruz (yellow card) 55'; Ziyech 59'	Summary	Havenaar 12'; Schaken 27'; Malone (yellow card) 34'; Wormgoor 72'; Duplan 80'	Stadium: De Grolsch Veste; Attendance: 24,900; Referee: (Netherlands) Serdar Gözübüyük

23 August 2015 Match 3	ADO Den Haag	1–1	Utrecht	The Hague
14:30 CET	Schaken (yellow card) 54'; Havenaar 89'; Duplan (yellow card) 90+2'	Summary	Letschert (yellow card) 3'; Haller 30' (pen.); Nganioni (yellow card) 51'	Stadium: Kyocera Stadion; Attendance: 12,293; Referee: (Netherlands) Pol Van Boekel

30 August 2015 Match 4	Ajax	4–0	ADO Den Haag	Amsterdam
12:30 CET	El Ghazi 16' 74'; Klaassen 20'; Veltman 58'	Summary	Alberg (yellow card) 34'; Beugelsdijk (yellow card) 83'	Stadium: Amsterdam Arena; Attendance: 43,578; Referee: (Netherlands) Danny Makkelie

13 September 2015 Match 5	ADO Den Haag	0–1	Heracles Almelo	The Hague
14:30 CET	Malone (yellow card) 41'; Zuiverloon (yellow card) 65'	Summary	Bel Hassani (yellow card) 34'; Weghorst 38' (yellow card) 56'; Droste (yellow card) 40'; Zomer (yellow card) 84'	Stadium: Kyocera Stadion; Attendance: 10,071; Referee: (Netherlands) Jeroen Manschot

19 September 2015 Match 6	PEC Zwolle	2–1	ADO Den Haag	Zwolle
19:45 CET	van Polen (yellow card) 26'; Becker 69' (yellow card) 90+6'; Veldwijk 79'; Lazić (yellow card) 90+4'	Summary	Alberg (yellow card) 32'; Havenaar 35'; Meijers (yellow card) 90+4'	Stadium: IJsseldelta Stadion; Attendance: 12,150; Referee: (Netherlands) Ed Janssen

27 September 2015 Match 7	ADO Den Haag	3–3	Excelsior	The Hague
14:30 CET	Havenaar 7' 65'; Duplan (yellow card) 43'; Zuiverloon 49' (yellow card) 83'; Kristensen (yellow card) 77'	Summary	Auassar 44' 62'; Kuwas 81'; Kruys (yellow card) 87'	Stadium: Kyocera Stadion; Attendance: 10,667; Referee: (Netherlands) Siemen Mulder

3 October 2015 Match 8	NEC	4–1	ADO Den Haag	Nijmegen
18:30 CET	Meijers 1' (o.g.); Santos (yellow card) 36' (goal) 63' 79'; Limbombe 76'	Summary	Wormgoor 21'	Stadium: Stadion de Goffert; Attendance: 11,534; Referee: (Netherlands) Kevin Blom

18 October 2015 Match 9	ADO Den Haag	1–1	De Graafschap	The Hague
14:30 CET	Duplan (yellow card) 28'; Havenaar (yellow card) 40' (goal) 41'	Summary	Zuiverloon 45' (o.g.); Smeets (yellow card) 64'; Will (yellow card) 73'; Tolgahan Çiçek (yellow card) 87'	Stadium: Kyocera Stadion; Attendance: 10,512; Referee: (Netherlands) Björn Kuipers

25 October 2015 Match 10	Cambuur	1–1	ADO Den Haag	Leeuwarden
12:30 CET	Narsingh 51'; Peersman (yellow card) 57'	Summary	Jansen (yellow card) 16'; Havenaar 47'	Stadium: Cambuur Stadion; Attendance: 9,519; Referee: (Netherlands) Dennis Higler

1 November 2015 Match 11	ADO Den Haag	1–0	Feyenoord	The Hague
12:30 CET	Duplan (yellow card) 60' (red card) 82' van Beek 69' (o.g.); Malone (yellow card) 75'	Summary	Vejinović (yellow card) 53'; Gustafson (yellow card) 66'; El Ahmadi (yellow card) 72'; Başaçıkoğlu (yellow card) 86'	Stadium: Kyocera Stadion; Attendance: 14,261; Referee: (Netherlands) Kevin Blom

6 November 2015 Match 12	Roda	1–1	ADO Den Haag	Kerkrade
20:00 CET	Van Hyfte 11'; Griffiths (yellow card) 57'; Juric (red card) 63'	Summary	Havenaar 41'; Alberg (yellow card) 80'	Stadium: Parkstad Limburg Stadion; Attendance: 14,182; Referee: (Netherlands) Eric Braamhaar

22 November 2015 Match 13	ADO Den Haag	2–2	Vitesse Arnhem	The Hague
16:45 CET	Schaken 33' (yellow card) 72'; Bakker (yellow card) 37'; Derijck 51' (pen.)	Summary	Yeini 6'; Leerdam 37'	Stadium: Kyocera Stadion; Attendance: 12,113; Referee: (Netherlands) Bas Nijhuis

29 November 2015 Match 14	Groningen	2–1	ADO Den Haag	Groningen
14:30 CET	Beugelsdijk 49' (o.g.); Maduro (yellow card) 63'; Rusnák (yellow card) 66'; Reijnen (yellow card) 74'; Kappelhof (yellow card) 80'; Hoesen 90+5'	Summary	Duplan 24'; Jansen (yellow card) 75'; Meijers (yellow card) 87'; Hansen (yellow card) 90+2'; Derijck (yellow card) 90+5'	Stadium: Euroborg; Attendance: 19,480; Referee: (Netherlands) Dennis Higler

4 December 2015 Match 15	AZ	0–1	ADO Den Haag	Alkmaar
20:00 CET	Brežančić (yellow card) 69'; Johansson (yellow card) 88'	Summary	Bakker 9'; Malone (yellow card) 83'; Hansen (yellow card) 87'	Stadium: AFAS Stadion; Attendance: 13,743; Referee: (Netherlands) Björn Kuipers

12 December 2015 Match 16	ADO Den Haag	1–1	Willem II	The Hague
18:30 CET	Beugelsdijk (yellow card) 23'; Jansen 33'; Malone (red card) 54'	Summary	Peters (yellow card) 9' van der Velden 55' (pen.) (yellow card) 80'; Wuytens (yellow card) 60'; Joppen (yellow card) 78'	Stadium: Kyocera Stadion; Attendance: 11,703; Referee: (Netherlands) Allard Lindhout

20 December 2015 Match 17	Heerenveen	0–4	ADO Den Haag	Heerenveen
14:30 CET	van Aken (yellow card) 56'; Otigba (yellow card) 79'	Summary	Derijck (yellow card) 15'; Meijers 21' (yellow card) 60'; Wormgoor (yellow card) 39'; Bakker 50'; Jansen (yellow card) 53' (goal) 90+1'; Beugelsdijk 64'	Stadium: Abe Lenstra Stadion; Attendance: 23,122; Referee: (Netherlands) Manschot

17 January 2016 Match 18	ADO Den Haag	0–1	Ajax	The Hague
12:30 CET	Schaken (yellow card) 56'; Havenaar (yellow card) 77'; Bakker (yellow card) 84'	Summary	Younes 21'; Bazoer (yellow card) 44'	Stadium: Kyocera Stadion; Attendance: 14,561; Referee: (Netherlands) Pol van Boekel

24 January 2016 Match 19	ADO Den Haag	2–1	Cambuur	The Hague
16:45 CET	Zuiverloon (yellow card) 34'; Havenaar 53' 56'	Summary	Lachman (yellow card) 6' van de Streek 14'; Peersman (yellow card) 30'; Jamiro Monteiro (yellow card) 35'; Bakker (yellow card) 38'	Stadium: Kyocera Stadion; Attendance: 10,342; Referee: (Netherlands) Serdar Gözübüyük

27 January 2016 Match 20	De Graafschap	3–1	ADO Den Haag	Doetinchem
19:45 CET	Vida (yellow card) 74'; Vermeij 69' (yellow card) 77'; Tarfi 78'; Driver (yellow card) 80'; Peters 90+1'	Summary	Havenaar 9'; Bakker (yellow card) 83'; Duplan (yellow card) 90+2'	Stadium: De Vijverberg; Attendance: 9,763; Referee: (Netherlands) Martin van den Kerkhof

31 January 2016 Match 21	Feyenoord	0–2	ADO Den Haag	Rotterdam
14:30 CET	Başaçıkoğlu (yellow card) 38'; El Ahmadi (yellow card) 67'	Summary	Jansen 41'; Zuiverloon 59' (yellow card) 76'; Marengo (yellow card) 75'	Stadium: De Kuip; Attendance: 47,500; Referee: (Netherlands) Danny Makkelie

6 February 2016 Match 22	ADO Den Haag	2–2	Roda	The Hague
18:30	Jansen 20' (yellow card) 60'; Wormgoor (yellow card) 39'; Derijck 53'	Summary	Van Hyfte 45'; Marcos (yellow card) 55'; İnceman (yellow card) 78'; Peterson 81'	Stadium: Kyocera Stadion; Attendance: 11,349; Referee: (Netherlands) Siemen Mulder

14 February 2016 Match 23	Excelsior	2–4	ADO Den Haag	Rotterdam
14:30	van Weert 24' 69'; Bruins (yellow card) 41'; Vermeulen (yellow card) 73'	Summary	Jansen 9'; Duplan (yellow card) 41' van der Heijden 78' 86'; Havenaar 89'	Stadium: Stadion Woudestein; Attendance: 3,519; Referee: (Netherlands) Ed Janssen

19 February 2016 Match 24	ADO Den Haag	0–2	PEC Zwolle	The Hague
20:00	Meijers (yellow card) 31'; Beugelsdijk (yellow card) 48'	Summary	Ehizibue (yellow card) 27'; Dekker 44'; Veldwijk 90+1'	Stadium: Kyocera Stadion; Attendance: 11,784; Referee: (Netherlands) Jeroen Manschot

27 February 2016 Match 25	PSV	2–0	ADO Den Haag	Eindhoven
18:45	Arias (yellow card) 42'; Willems (yellow card) 65' van Ginkel 72' de Jong 82'	Summary	Malone (yellow card) 6'; Ebecilio (yellow card) 52'; Derijck (yellow card) 54'; Ebuehi (yellow card) 71'; Bakker (yellow card) 81'	Stadium: Philips Stadion; Attendance: 33,500; Referee: (Netherlands) Dennis Higler

4 March 2016 Match 26	ADO Den Haag	2–1	Twente	The Hague
19:00	Kristensen 2'; Derijck 52' (pen.)	Summary	Bruno Uvini (yellow card) 51'; Ziyech (yellow card) 74' (goal) 80'	Stadium: Kyocera Stadion; Attendance: 13,128; Referee: (Netherlands) Kevin Blom

13 March 2016 Match 27	Utrecht	2–2	ADO Den Haag	Utrecht
12:30	Strieder (yellow card) 16'; Haller 23'; Bouymans 42'; Ligeon (yellow card) 45'		Meijers (yellow card) 15'; Bakker 48'; Kanon (yellow card) 51'; Havenaar 63'; Beugelsdijk (yellow card) 65'; Ebecilio (yellow card) 88'	Stadium: Stadion Galgenwaard; Attendance: 14,164; Referee: (Netherlands) Siemen Mulder

20 March 2016 Match 28	ADO Den Haag	1–0	NEC	The Hague
14:30	Malone 89'	Summary	van Eijden (yellow card) 40'; Foor (yellow card) 90+2'	Stadium: Kyocera Stadion; Attendance: 10,784; Referee: (Netherlands) Martin van den Kerkhof

3 April 2016 Match 29	ADO Den Haag	0–1	Groningen	The Hague
14:30		Summary	de Leeuw (red card) 30'; Burnet (yellow card) 61'; Lindgren 76'; Padt (yellow card) 84'; Sørloth (yellow card) 89'	Stadium: Kyocera Stadion; Attendance: 11,891; Referee: (Netherlands) Bas Nijhuis

9 April 2016 Match 30	Vitesse Arnhem	2–2	ADO Den Haag	Arnhem
19:45	Yeini (yellow card) 22'; Kashia 35'; Oliynyk (yellow card) 85' (goal) 90'; Ota (yellow card) 89'	Summary	Havenaar 7'; Jansen (yellow card) 52' van der Werff 63' (o.g.)	Stadium: GelreDome; Attendance: 16,298; Referee: (Netherlands) Jochem Kamphuis

17 April 2016 Match 31	Willem II	0–2	ADO Den Haag	Tilburg
14:30	Peters (yellow card) 50'	Summary	Havenaar 20'; Bakker (yellow card) 51' van der Struijk 59' (o.g.); Meijers (yellow card) 67'	Stadium: Koning Willem II Stadion; Attendance: 13,100; Referee: (Netherlands) Ed Janssen

21 April 2016 Match 32	ADO Den Haag	1–2	AZ	The Hague
18:30	Beugelsdijk 30'; Schaken (yellow card) 32'	Summary	dos Santos 21'; Wuytens (yellow card) 62'; Henriksen 65'; Tanković (yellow card) 84'	Stadium: Kyocera Stadion; Attendance: 13,128; Referee: (Netherlands) Siemen Mulder

30 April 2016 Match 33	Heracles Almelo	1–1	ADO Den Haag	Almelo
14:30	Gladon 88'	Summary	Bakker (yellow card) 31'; Duplan 68'; Havenaar (yellow card) 90+3'	Stadium: Polman Stadion; Attendance: 11.681; Referee: (Netherlands) Jeroen Manschot

7 May 2016 Match 34	ADO Den Haag	1–1	Heerenveen	The Hague
14:30	Havenaar 31' (pen.); Bakker (yellow card) 65'	Summary	Cavlan (yellow card) 30' te Vrede 51'; Slagveer (yellow card) 83'	Stadium: Kyocera Stadion; Attendance: 12.753; Referee: (Netherlands) Kevin Blom

=== KNVB Beker ===
==== Matches ====
22 September 2015 Round 2	SC Genemuiden	2–2 (a.e.t.) (3–1 p)	ADO Den Haag	Genemuiden
20:00	Anne van der Kolk 42' 49'; Robert Boes (yellow card) 75'; Mike van der Kooy (yellow card) 79' (yellow-red card); Jacco Riemens 100'	Summary	Gorré 18' (yellow card) 89'; Havenaar 37'; Marengo 120'	Stadium: Sportpark de Wetering; Attendance: 2,200; Referee: (Netherlands) Christian Bax

== Player details ==
No.	Pos	Nat	Player	Total		Eredivisie		KNVB Cup	
No.	Pos	Nat	Player	Apps	Goals	Apps	Goals	Apps	Goals
1	GK	(Denmark) DEN	Martin Hansen	33	1	33	1	0	0
2	DF	(Netherlands) NED	Dion Malone	26	1	25	1	1	0
3	DF	(Netherlands) NED	Vito Wormgoor	24	2	23	2	1	0
4	DF	(Belgium) BEL	Timothy Derijck	27	3	27	3	0	0
5	DF	(Ivory Coast) CIV	Wilfried Kanon	14	0	14	0	0	0
6	MF	(Denmark) DEN	Thomas Kristensen	19	1	18	1	1	0
7	MF	(Netherlands) NED	Kevin Jansen	29	5	28	5	1	0
8	MF	(Netherlands) NED	Aaron Meijers	32	1	31	1	1	0
9	FW	(Japan) JPN	Mike Havenaar	32	17	31	16	1	1
10	MF	(Denmark) DEN	Mathias Gehrt	0	0	0	0	0	0
11	FW	(Netherlands) NED	Ludcinio Marengo	22	1	21	0	1	1
14	FW	(Netherlands) NED	Giovanni Korte	17	0	17	0	0	0
15	MF	(Netherlands) NED	Kyle Ebecilio	6	0	6	0	0	0
17	MF	(Netherlands) NED	Danny Bakker	33	3	33	3	0	0
18	GK	(Netherlands) NED	Tim Coremans	0	0	0	0	0	0
19	FW	(Netherlands) NED	Dennis van der Heijden	9	2	9	2	0	0
20	FW	(Netherlands) NED	Ruben Schaken	29	2	29	2	0	0
21	FW	(France) FRA	Edouard Duplan	32	3	31	3	1	0
22	GK	(Netherlands) NED	Robert Zwinkels	2	0	1	0	1	0
24	GK	(Netherlands) NED	Rody de Boer	0	0	0	0	0	0
25	DF	(Netherlands) NED	Tom Beugelsdijk	24	2	24	2	0	0
27	MF	(Netherlands) NED	Dylan Nieuwenhuijs	0	0	0	0	0	0
28	DF	(Netherlands) NED	Tyronne Ebuehi	15	0	14	0	1	0
30	FW	(Netherlands) NED	Segun Owobowale	0	0	0	0	0	0
31	MF	(Netherlands) NED	Hector Hevel	3	0	3	0	0	0
51	DF	(Netherlands) NED	Gianni Zuiverloon	23	2	22	2	1	0

Sources: Squad numbers, Eredivisie en KNVB Cup stats,

== Transfers ==
In: Note: Flags indicate national team as defined under FIFA eligibility rules; some limited exceptions apply. Players may hold more than one non-FIFA nationality.

No.	Pos.	Nation	Player
—	FW	NED	Ludcinio Marengo (from (Netherlands) FC Volendam)
—	FW	NED	Ruben Schaken (from (Azerbaijan) Inter Baki)
—	DF	NED	Tom Beugelsdijk (from (Germany) FSV Frankfurt)
—	FW	FRA	Edouard Duplan (from (Netherlands) FC Utrecht)
—	FW	JPN	Mike Havenaar (from (Finland) HJK Helsinki)
—	MF	NED	Kyle Ebecilio (on loan from (Netherlands) FC Twente)

Out: Note: Flags indicate national team as defined under FIFA eligibility rules; some limited exceptions apply. Players may hold more than one non-FIFA nationality.

No.	Pos.	Nation	Player
—	FW	NED	Michiel Kramer (to (Netherlands) Feyenoord)
—	FW	NED	Mike van Duinen (to (Germany) Fortuna Düsseldorf)
—	FW	NED	Ninos Gouriye (to (Romania) Astra Giurgiu)
—	MF	POL	Ricky van Haaren (to (Romania) FC Dinamo București)
—	FW	NED	Malcolm Esajas (to (Netherlands) FC Den Bosch)
—	FW	NED	Mitchell Schet (to (Slovakia) AS Trenčín)
—	FW	NED	Xander Houtkoop (to (Netherlands) SC Cambuur)
—	DF	NED	Richelo Fecunda (to (Netherlands) HBS Craeyenhout)
—	DF	NED	Guy Smith (to (Netherlands) VV Noordwijk)
—	MF	NED	Roland Alberg (to (United States) Philadelphia Union)
—	DF	NED	Sem de Wit (to (Netherlands) SC Cambuur)
—	FW	NED	Gervane Kastaneer (on loan to (Netherlands) FC Eindhoven)

Sources: Transfers 2015–16
