= 2019–20 ADO Den Haag season =

ADO Den Haag
2019–20 season
- Owner: United Vansen Limited
- Chairman: Ben Knüppe
- Manager: Alfons Groenendijk (until 2 December 2019); Alan Pardew (24 December 2019–28 April 2020)
- Eredivisie: 17th
- KNVB Cup: First round
- Top goalscorer: League: Tomáš Necid (6); All: Tomáš Necid (6)
Home colours	Away colours	Third colours
- All statistics correct as of 29 April 2020.

During the 2019–20 season, ADO Den Haag participated in the Eredivisie and the KNVB Cup. Due to the COVID-19 pandemic, the Eredivisie season was abandoned with ADO Den Haag in 17th place. They were knocked out in the first round of the KNVB Cup, losing in the first round at Fortuna Sittard.

== Season summary ==
After a poor start to the season, manager Alfons Groenendijk resigned on 2 December 2019, with Den Haag second bottom in the Eredivisie. On 24 December 2019, Den Haag appointed English manager Alan Pardew as their new manager signing a contract until the end of the season, with Chris Powell appointed as assistant manager. Pardew took charge of eight league games, winning one, before play was halted in the Netherlands on 12 March due to the coronavirus pandemic. Den Haag were seven points from safety in the 2019–20 Eredivisie before the season was cancelled with no relegation. On 28 April 2020, Pardew left the club after both parties mutually agreed to not extend his contract beyond the end of the season.

== Friendly matches ==
Win Draw Loss

6 January 2020 Friendly	ADO Den Haag	2–0	Noordwijk	Alhaurín el Grande, Spain
11:00 CET (UTC+1)				Stadium: Estadio Municipal Miguel Fijones

9 January 2020 Friendly	1899 Hoffenheim	1–2	ADO Den Haag	Marbella, Spain
15:30 CET (UTC+1)	Locadia 16'	Report	Necid 62' (pen.); Summerville 89'	Stadium: Campo La Quinta

== Competitions ==
Win Draw Loss

=== Overview ===
Competition	First match	Last match	Starting round	Final position	Record							
Competition	First match	Last match	Starting round	Final position	Pld	W	D	L	GF	GA	GD	Win %
Eredivisie	4 August 2019	7 March 2020	Matchday 1	17th	26	4	7	15	25	54	−29	15.38
KNVB Cup	31 October 2019		First round	First round	1	0	0	1	0	3	−3	0.00
Total					27	4	7	16	25	57	−32	14.81

Last updated: 7 March 2020
Source: Soccerway

=== Eredivisie ===
==== League table ====
Pos	Team	Pld	W	D	L	GF	GA	GD	Pts
14	FC Twente	26	7	6	13	34	46	−12	27
15	PEC Zwolle	26	7	5	14	37	55	−18	26
16	Fortuna Sittard	26	6	8	12	29	52	−23	26
17	ADO Den Haag	26	4	7	15	25	54	−29	19
18	RKC Waalwijk	26	4	3	19	27	60	−33	15

Source: eredivisie.nl
Rules for classification: Season in progress: 1) Most points won; 2) Less points lost; 3) Goal difference; 4) Goals scored; 5) Alphabetical order; End of season: 1) Points; 2) Goal difference; 3) Goals scored; 4) Head-to-head points; 5) Head-to-head goal difference; 6) Head-to-head away goals scored; 7) Play-off if relevant for deciding champion, relegation or participating in a European league, otherwise by draw. 8) Penalty shoot-out (only after a play-off)

==== Results summary ====
Overall								Home						Away					
Pld	W	D	L	GF	GA	GD	Pts	W	D	L	GF	GA	GD	W	D	L	GF	GA	GD
26	4	7	15	25	54	−29	19	2	6	5	11	17	−6	2	1	10	14	37	−23

Last updated: 7 March 2020.
Source: Eredivisie

==== Results by round ====
Round	1	2	3	4	5	6	7	8	9	10	11	12	13	14	15	16	17	18	19	20	21	22	23	24	25	26	27	28	29	30	31	32	33	34
Ground	H	A	H	A	H	A	H	A	H	A	A	H	A	H	A	H	H	A	H	A	H	A	H	A	H	A	H	A	H	A	H	A	A	H
Result	L	L	L	W	W	L	L	L	L	L	W	D	L	D	L	D	D	L	W	L	D	L	L	D	D	L	C	C	C	C	C	C	C	C
Position	14	15	17	12	10	14	15	16	16	16	15	14	15	17	17	17	17	17	16	17	17	17	17	17	17	17	17	17	17	17	17	17	17	17

Updated to match(es) played on 7 March 2020. Source: Eredivisie
A = Away; H = Home; W = Win; D = Draw; L = Loss

==== Matches ====
The Eredivisie schedule was announced on 14 June 2019. The 2019–20 season was abandoned on 24 April 2020, due to the coronavirus pandemic in the Netherlands.

4 August 2019 1	ADO Den Haag	2–4	Utrecht	The Hague
16:45 CEST (UTC+2)	Necid (yellow card) 8'; Meijers 21'; Falkenburg 25'; Bakker (yellow card) 55'	Report	Černý (yellow card) 30'; Zwinkels 36' (o.g.); Kerk 44'; Immers 52' (o.g.); Venema 63'	Stadium: Cars Jeans Stadion; Attendance: 10,633; Referee: Kevin Blom

11 August 2019 2	PSV	3–1	ADO Den Haag	Eindhoven
20:00 CEST (UTC+2)	Bruma 44'; Bergwijn (yellow card) 45+1'; Malen 52'; Gakpo 90+1'	Report	Necid 33'	Stadium: Philips Stadion; Attendance: 32,000; Referee: Danny Makkelie

17 August 2019 3	ADO Den Haag	1–2	Sparta Rotterdam	The Hague
19:45 CEST (UTC+2)		Report		Stadium: Cars Jeans Stadion; Attendance: 12,479; Referee: Dennis Higler

25 August 2019 4	RKC Waalwijk	0–3	ADO Den Haag	Waalwijk
12:15 CEST (UTC+2)		Report		Stadium: Mandemakers Stadion; Attendance: 5,034; Referee: Edwin van de Graaf

31 August 2019 5	ADO Den Haag	1–0	VVV-Venlo	The Hague
20:45 CEST (UTC+2)		Report		Stadium: Cars Jeans Stadion; Attendance: 10,617; Referee: Siemen Mulder

15 September 2019 6	Feyenoord	3–2	ADO Den Haag	Rotterdam
14:30 CEST (UTC+2)	Karsdorp 7' (pen.); Narsingh 21'; Fer 33' (pen.)		Ié 77' (o.g.); Tapia 83' (o.g.)	Stadium: De Kuip; Attendance: 43,694; Referee: Serdar Gözübüyük

22 September 2019 7	ADO Den Haag	0–1	AZ	The Hague
16:45 CEST (UTC+2)		Report	Koopmeiners 75'	Stadium: Cars Jeans Stadion; Attendance: 12,091; Referee: Allard Lindhout

27 September 2019 8	FC Emmen	3–0	ADO Den Haag	Emmen
16:45 CEST (UTC+2)		Report		Stadium: De Oude Meerdijk; Attendance: 8,002; Referee: Erwin Blank

6 October 2019 9	ADO Den Haag	0–2	Ajax	The Hague
12:15 CEST (UTC+2)	Meijers (yellow card) 37'; Kramer (yellow card) 43'; Bakker (yellow card) 62'		Huntelaar 10'; Promes (yellow card) 35'; Tagliafico (yellow card) 56'; Neres 86'	Stadium: Cars Jeans Stadion; Attendance: 14,733; Referee: Kevin Blom

20 October 2019 10	PEC Zwolle	3–1	ADO Den Haag	Zwolle
12:15 CEST (UTC+2)		Report		Stadium: MAC³PARK Stadion; Attendance: 12,943; Referee: Serdar Gözübüyük

26 October 2019 11	Vitesse	0–2	ADO Den Haag	Arnhem
19:45 CEST (UTC+2)		Report		Stadium: GelreDome; Attendance: 12,663; Referee: Jeroen Manschot

3 November 2019 12	ADO Den Haag	1–1	SC Heerenveen	The Hague
16:45 CET (UTC+1)		Report		Stadium: Cars Jeans Stadion; Attendance: 12,681; Referee: Sander van der Eijk

9 November 2019 13	Fortuna Sittard	1–0	ADO Den Haag	Sittard
19:45 CET (UTC+1)		Report		Stadium: Fortuna Sittard Stadion; Attendance: 8,223; Referee: Martin van den Kerkhof

23 November 2019 14	ADO Den Haag	3–3	Willem II	The Hague
20:45 CET (UTC+1)		Report		Stadium: Cars Jeans Stadion; Attendance: 10,889; Referee: Allard Lindhout

30 November 2019 15	Heracles Almelo	4–0	ADO Den Haag	Almelo
20:45 CET (UTC+1)		Report		Stadium: Erve Asito; Attendance: 10,150; Referee: Jeroen Manschot

7 December 2019 16	ADO Den Haag	0–0	Twente	The Hague
18:30 CET (UTC+1)		Report		Stadium: Cars Jeans Stadion; Attendance: 11,439; Referee: Siemen Mulder

14 December 2019 17	ADO Den Haag	1–1	Groningen	The Hague
18:30 CET (UTC+1)		Report		Stadium: Cars Jeans Stadion; Attendance: 11,049; Referee: Joey Kooij

22 December 2019 18	Ajax	6–1	ADO Den Haag	Amsterdam
12:15 CET (UTC+1)	Ziyech 15'; Van de Beek 23'; Ekkelenkamp 37'; Gravenberch 39'; Tadić 48'; Traoré 63'; Marin (yellow card) 74'; Hansen (yellow card) 84'; Martínez (yellow card) 90+1'		Bakker (yellow card) 43' (yellow-red card) 80'; Haye (yellow card) 45+1'; Pinas (yellow card) 78'; Summerville (yellow card) 89'; Goossens 90+2' (pen.)	Stadium: Johan Cruyff Arena; Attendance: 53,976; Referee: Dennis Higler

19 January 2020 19	ADO Den Haag	2–0	RKC Waalwijk	The Hague
16:45 CET (UTC+1)		Report		Stadium: Cars Jeans Stadion; Attendance: 12,433; Referee: Jeroen Manschot

24 January 2020 20	Utrecht	4–0	ADO Den Haag	Utrecht
20:00 CET (UTC+1)		Report		Stadium: Stadion Galgenwaard

1 February 2020 21	ADO Den Haag	0–0	Vitesse	The Hague
18:30 CET (UTC+1)		Report		Stadium: Cars Jeans Stadion; Attendance: 12,387; Referee: Joey Kooij

11 February 2020 22	Sparta Rotterdam	4–2	ADO Den Haag	Rotterdam
20:45 CET (UTC+1)		Report		Stadium: Sparta Stadion; Attendance: 8,083; Referee: Danny Makkelie

15 February 2020 23	ADO Den Haag	0–3	PSV	The Hague
19:45 CET (UTC+1)	Meijers (yellow card) 66'	Report	Lammers 17' (pen.); Thomas 70'; Gakpo 83'	Stadium: Cars Jeans Stadion; Attendance: 13,370; Referee: Pol van Boekel

22 February 2020 24	SC Heerenveen	2–2	ADO Den Haag	Heerenveen
19:45 CET (UTC+1)		Report		Stadium: Abe Lenstra Stadion; Attendance: 16,640; Referee: Martin van den Kerkhof

29 February 2020 25	ADO Den Haag	0–0	Heracles Almelo	The Hague
18:30 CET (UTC+1)		Report		Stadium: Cars Jeans Stadion; Attendance: 11,207; Referee: Christiaan Bax

7 March 2020 26	AZ	4–0	ADO Den Haag	Alkmaar
18:30 CET (UTC+1)	Clasie (yellow card) 2'; Koopmeiners 13' (pen.), 84'; Wijndal 19'; Druijf 89'	Report	Meijers (yellow card) 61'; Băluță (yellow card) 78'; Necid (yellow card) 90+1'	Stadium: AFAS Stadion; Attendance: 16,117; Referee: Dennis Higler

13 March 2020 27	ADO Den Haag	Cancelled	Fortuna Sittard	The Hague
20:00 CET (UTC+1)				Stadium: Cars Jeans Stadion
Note: Match was scheduled for 13 March, but cancelled due to the COVID-19 pandemic in the Netherlands.

21 March 2020 28	Twente	Cancelled	ADO Den Haag	Enschede
18:30 CET (UTC+1)				Stadium: De Grolsch Veste
Note: Match was initially scheduled for 21 March, but cancelled due to the COVID-19 pandemic in the Netherlands.

5 April 2020 29	ADO Den Haag	Cancelled	FC Emmen	The Hague
18:30 CEST (UTC+2)				Stadium: Cars Jeans Stadion
Note: Match was initially scheduled for 5 April, but cancelled due to the COVID-19 pandemic in the Netherlands.

11 April 2020 30	Willem II	Cancelled	ADO Den Haag	Tilburg
20:45 CEST (UTC+2)				Stadium: Koning Willem II Stadion
Note: Match was initially scheduled for 11 April, but cancelled due to the COVID-19 pandemic in the Netherlands.

22 April 2020 31	ADO Den Haag	Cancelled	Feyenoord	The Hague
18:30 CEST (UTC+2)				Stadium: Cars Jeans Stadion
Note: Match was initially scheduled for 22 April, but cancelled due to the COVID-19 pandemic in the Netherlands.

26 April 2020 32	VVV-Venlo	Cancelled	ADO Den Haag	Venlo
18:30 CEST (UTC+2)				Stadium: De Koel
Note: Match was initially scheduled for 26 April, but cancelled due to the COVID-19 pandemic in the Netherlands.

3 May 2020 33	Groningen	Cancelled	ADO Den Haag	Groningen
18:30 CEST (UTC+2)				Stadium: Euroborg
Note: Match was initially scheduled for 3 May, but cancelled due to the COVID-19 pandemic in the Netherlands.

10 May 2020 34	ADO Den Haag	Cancelled	PEC Zwolle	The Hague
18:30 CEST (UTC+2)				Stadium: Cars Jeans Stadion
Note: Match was initially scheduled for 10 May, but cancelled due to the COVID-19 pandemic in the Netherlands.

=== KNVB Cup ===
31 October 2019 First round	Fortuna Sittard	3–0	ADO Den Haag	Sittard
20:45 CET (UTC+1)	Diemers 59' (pen.); Damașcan 61'; Zeka 76'	Report		Stadium: Fortuna Sittard Stadion; Attendance: 4,822; Referee: Siemen Mulder

== Transfers ==
=== Transfers in ===
Date	Position	Player	From	Fee	Ref.
1 July 2019	FW	Michiel Kramer	FC Utrecht	Free	
1 July 2019	DF	Milan van Ewijk	Excelsior Maassluis	Free	
7 August 2019	MF	Bilal Ould-Chikh	(Turkey) Denizlispor	Free	
12 September 2019	MF	Thom Haye	(Italy) Lecce	Free	

=== Transfers out ===
Date	Position	Player	To	Fee	Ref.
1 July 2019	DF	Trevor David	Released	Free	
1 July 2019	FW	Melvyn Lorenzen	Released	Free	
1 July 2019	MF	Johnny Reynolds	Released	Free	
1 July 2019	MF	Sheraldo Becker	(Germany) 1. FC Union Berlin	Free	
1 July 2019	MF	Kyle Ebecilio	Excelsior	Free	
1 July 2019	MF	Sam van Huffel	Koninklijke HFC	Free	
1 July 2019	MF	Nino Roffelsen	Sparta	Free	
31 July 2019	GK	Indy Groothuizen	(Denmark) Vejle Boldklub	Undisclosed	
5 August 2019	FW	Delano Ladan	SC Cambuur	Free	
15 August 2019	FW	Abdenasser El Khayati	Qatar SC	Undisclosed	
16 August 2019	DF	Nick Kuipers	(Indonesia) Persib Bandung	Undisclosed	
18 September 2019	DF	Wilfried Kanon	(Egypt) Pyramids FC	Undisclosed	

=== Loans in ===
Date	Position	Player	From	Date until	Ref.
20 August 2019	GK	Luuk Koopmans	PSV Eindhoven	30 June 2020 (Note: Following the loan, Koopmans will sign a three-year contract with ADO Den Haag)	
21 August 2019	FW	Paweł Cibicki	(England) Leeds United	12 January 2020 (Note: Cibicki recalled in order to complete transfer to Pogoń Szczecin.)	
30 August 2019	FW	Crysencio Summerville	Feyenoord	30 June 2020	
2 September 2019	DF	Aleksandar Bjelica	(Poland) Korona Kielce	30 June 2020	
7 January 2020	DF	Sam Stubbs	(England) Middlesbrough	30 June 2020	
13 January 2020	MF	George Thomas	(England) Leicester City	30 June 2020	
13 January 2020	DF	Laurens De Bock	(England) Leeds United	30 June 2020	
13 January 2020	FW	Mick van Buren	(Czech Republic) Slavia Prague	30 June 2020	
16 January 2020	MF	Tudor Băluță	(England) Brighton & Hove Albion	30 June 2020	
31 January 2020	FW	Omar Bogle	(Wales) Cardiff City	11 May 2020	
31 January 2020	MF	Mark Duffy	(England) Sheffield United	30 June 2020	

=== Loans out ===
Date	Position	Player	To	Date until	Ref.
5 August 2019	DF	Hennos Asmelash	TOP Oss	30 June 2020	
2 September 2019	MF	Thijmen Goppel	MVV Maastricht	30 June 2020	
2 January 2020	GK	Mike Havekotte	FC Dordrecht	30 June 2020	
14 January 2020	DF	Robin Polley	FC Dordrecht	30 June 2020	
29 January 2020	MF	Thom Haye	NAC Breda	30 June 2020	
31 January 2020	DF	Milan van Ewijk	SC Cambuur	30 June 2020	
