= Kyvon Leidsman =

Dutch footballer (born 1998)

Personal information
- Date of birth: 3 September 1998 (age 28)
- Place of birth: Amsterdam, Netherlands
- Height: 1.78 m (5 ft 10 in)
- Position: Forward

Team information
- Current team: Liepāja
- Number: 44

Youth career
- –2014: AFC
- 2014–2015: Heerenveen
- 2015–2016: AFC
- 2016–2017: De Graafschap

Senior career*
Years	Team	Apps	(Gls)
2016–2018	Jong De Graafschap	37	(10)
2018	De Graafschap	0	(0)
2018–2020	Jong Almere City	11	(1)
2020–2023	TOP Oss	75	(11)
2023	UTA Arad	5	(0)
2024	Dila	17	(2)
2024–	Liepāja	68	(15)
- * Club domestic league appearances and goals as of 12 November 2026

Kyvon Leidsman (born 3 September 1998) is a Dutch professional footballer who plays as a forward for Latvian Higher League club Liepāja.

== Career ==
=== Early career ===
Born in Amsterdam, Leidsman played in the youth of AFC and Heerenveen, before returning to AFC and subsequently moving to De Graafschap. At De Graafschap, he appeared for the reserve team, Jong Graafschap in the Derde Divisie Sunday from 2016 to 2018. For the 2018–19 season, Leidsman was promoted to the first team, where he sat on the bench four times in the Eredivisie. In November 2018, he left the club due to lack of playing time. He joined the reserve team of Almere City FC, Jong Almere City, where he played for a season and a half.

=== TOP Oss ===
On 31 July 2020, Leidsman signed a one-year contract with TOP Oss, where he made his professional debut in a 1–2 home loss to Helmond Sport on 29 August. He came on for Trevor David in the 57th minute. He scored his first goal on 5 October in a 2–0 win over Dordrecht. He subsequently scored three additional goals during the fall season – in wins over Den Bosch, Jong PSV and NEC – and grew into an important player in midfield for the club. His performances were rewarded on 2 December 2020, where he signed a two-year contract extension with TOP Oss.

=== UTA Arad ===
On 4 July 2023, Leidsman moved to UTA Arad in Romania on a one-year contract with an optional second year. After making only seven total appearances, the club announced on 21 December 2023, that they had parted ways with Leidsman.

=== Dila ===
In February 2024, Leidsman joined Georgian side Dila Gori. He scored 39 minutes into his Erovnuli Liga debut in a 2–0 win over Gagra on 3 March 2024.

== Personal life ==
Born in the Netherlands, Leidsman is of Surinamese descent through this parents.
