= Hector Hevel =

Dutch footballer (born 1996)

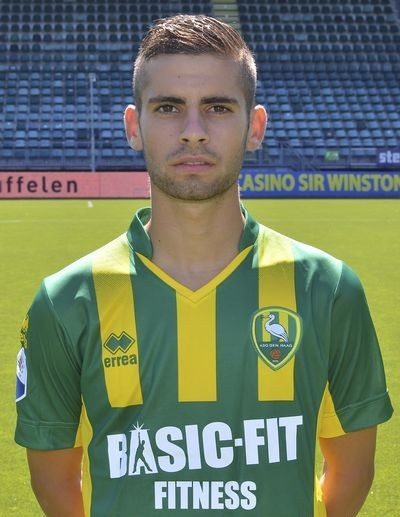
- Hevel with ADO Den Haag in 2015

Personal information
- Full name: Hector Alexander Hevel Serrano
- Date of birth: 15 May 1996 (age 30)
- Place of birth: Leidschendam, Netherlands
- Height: 1.71 m (5 ft 7 in)
- Position: Midfielder

Team information
- Current team: Johor Darul Ta'zim
- Number: 8

Youth career
- –2004: Voorschoten '97
- 2004–2014: ADO Den Haag

Senior career*
Years	Team	Apps	(Gls)
2014–2017	ADO Den Haag	11	(0)
2017–2020	AEK Larnaca	74	(5)
2020–2023	Andorra	83	(11)
2023–2024	Cartagena	15	(0)
2024–2025	Guangxi Pingguo	28	(4)
2025	Portimonense	13	(0)
2025–	Johor Darul Ta'zim	5	(0)

International career^{‡}
2012	Netherlands U16	3	(0)
2015-2016	Netherlands U20	2	(0)
2025	Malaysia	2	(1)
- * Club domestic league appearances and goals as of 21:22, 7 October 2025 (UTC) ‡ National team caps and goals as of 10 June 2025

Hector Alexander Hevel Serrano (born 15 May 1996) is a Dutch professional footballer who currently plays as a midfielder for Malaysia Super League club Johor Darul Ta'zim. A former Dutch youth international, he played for the Malaysia national team twice. However, he was suspended for a year from all football related activities after being sanctioned by FIFA in September 2025 for providing forged documents claiming his grandfather was born in Malaysia.

== Club career ==
=== AEK Larnaca ===
In January 2017, Hevel signed with Cypriot First Division club AEK Larnaca, where he played 74 league matches and scored five goals over three and a half seasons. During his tenure, he contributed to the team's success in winning the 2017–18 Cypriot Cup and the 2018 Cypriot Super Cup.

=== FC Andorra ===
In October 2020, Hevel joined FC Andorra, competing in Spain's Segunda División B. He played a pivotal role in the team's promotion to the Segunda División in the 2021–22 season, making 83 league appearances and netting 11 goals during his time with the club.

=== FC Cartagena ===
In June 2023 Hevel signed a contract with fellow Spanish Segunda División side FC Cartagena, where he made 15 league appearances.

=== Guangxi Pingguo Haliao ===
On 4 January 2024, Hevel signed with China League One club Guangxi Pingguo Haliao.

=== Portimonense ===
As of February 2025, Hevel signed with Portuguese club Portimonense S.C., where he has made six appearances in the Liga Portugal 2.

=== Johor Darul Ta'zim ===
On 23 June 2025, Hevel was announced as the latest signing for Malaysian Super League side Johor Darul Ta'zim.

== International career ==
In March 2025, it was reported that Hevel had been called up to the Malaysia national team due to claims of eligibility through descent. His club Portimonense announced his call-up on social media, indicating that he would join the Malaysia squad for the upcoming international fixtures.

On 19 March 2025, Hevel officially joined the national training camp in Johor Bahru. The Football Association of Malaysia (FAM) confirmed his participation in the squad preparing for the third round of the AFC Asian Cup qualifiers.

Hevel made his international debut for Malaysia on 25 March 2025 in a 2027 AFC Asian Cup qualification match against Nepal, held at the Sultan Ibrahim Stadium in Iskandar Puteri. He started as a central midfielder and scored the opening goal in the 29th minute, a deflected long-range strike that gave Malaysia a 1–0 lead in the first half. The goal capped off an organised build-up sequence and effective second-ball control. Hevel expressed gratitude for the support from teammates and coaching staff, stating that the short acclimatisation period required him to quickly adapt through active communication and training-ground collaboration. He described the debut as one of the most memorable moments of his career and conveyed excitement about contributing to Malaysia's footballing ambitions. A technical issue during the match resulted in his goal not being recorded in the official video broadcast.

In September 2025, Football Association of Malaysia (FAM), Hevel, and six other Malaysian heritage players were sanctioned by FIFA due to falsification and forgery of documents regarding the seven players' eligibility to play for Malaysia in the third round of the 2027 Asian Cup qualifiers against Vietnam. Each player was fined CHF 2,000 (around MYR 10,560) and were suspended from all football related activities for 12 months. FAM has confirmed it will file an appeal against FIFA's ruling.

== Style of play ==
Hevel is recognised for his technical proficiency and positional versatility in midfield. Capable of operating in both central and attacking roles, he contributes to ball distribution, build-up play, and transitional phases. His style of play is marked by spatial awareness, accurate passing, and tactical intelligence. Following his international debut for Malaysia in March 2025, local media noted his composure, effective distribution, and involvement in attacking build-up. His performance also drew comparisons among supporters to the playing style of Manchester United midfielder Bruno Fernandes, particularly for his creativity and control in the attacking third.

== Personal life ==
Hevel is of Spanish descent and also claimed Malaysian ancestry through his grandfather, who was said to hail from the state of Malacca. However, FIFA confirmed that Hevel's grandfather was born in The Hague, Netherlands, rendering his connections to Malaysia invalid.

== Career statistics ==
=== Club ===
As of match played 11 May 2025

Appearances and goals by club, season and competition
Club	Season	League			National cup (Note: Includes KNVB Cup, Cypriot Cup, Copa del Rey, Chinese FA Cup)		Continental		Other		Total	
Club	Season	Division	Apps	Goals	Apps	Goals	Apps	Goals	Apps	Goals	Apps	Goals
ADO Den Haag	2014–15	Eredivisie	2	0	0	0	—		—		2	0
ADO Den Haag	2015–16	Eredivisie	3	0	0	0	—		—		3	0
ADO Den Haag	2016–17	Eredivisie	6	0	2	0	—		—		8	0
ADO Den Haag	Total		11	0	2	0	—		—		13	0
AEK Larnaca	2016–17	Cypriot First Division	9	2	—		—		—		9	2
AEK Larnaca	2017–18	Cypriot First Division	25	0	6	2	8 (Note: Appearances in UEFA Europa League)	1	—		39	4
AEK Larnaca	2018–19	Cypriot First Division	23	2	4	0	12	0	1 (Note: Appearance in Cypriot Super Cup)	0	40	2
AEK Larnaca	2019–20	Cypriot First Division	17	1	2	1	6	2	—		25	4
AEK Larnaca	Total		74	5	12	3	26	3	1	0	113	11
Andorra	2020–21	Primera División RFEF	14	4	0	0	—		0	0	14	4
Andorra	2021–22	Primera División RFEF	30	6	2	0	—		1	0	33	6
Andorra	2022–23	Segunda División	39	1	0	0	—		—		39	1
Andorra	Total		83	11	2	0	—		1	0	86	11
Cartagena	2023–24	Segunda División	15	0	1	0	—		—		16	0
Guangxi Pingguo Haliao	2024	China League One	28	4	2	0	—		—		30	4
Portimonense	2024–25	Liga Portugal 2	13	0	0	0	—		—		13	0
Career total			224	20	19	3	26	3	2	0	261	26

=== International ===
As of match played 10 June 2025

Appearances and goals by national team and year
National team	Year	Apps	Goals
Malaysia	2025	2	1
Total		2	1

Scores and results list Malaysia's goal tally first, score column indicates score after each Hevel goal.

List of international goals scored by Hector Hevel
No.	Date	Venue	Opponent	Score	Result	Competition
1	25 March 2025	Sultan Ibrahim Stadium, Iskandar Puteri, Malaysia	Nepal	1–0	2–0	2027 AFC Asian Cup qualification

== Honours ==
AEK Larnaca

- Cypriot Cup: 2017–18
- Cypriot Super Cup: 2018

Johor Darul Ta'zim

- Malaysia Charity Shield: 2025
