= Guy Smith (footballer) =

Dutch footballer

Personal information
- Date of birth: 8 March 1996 (age 30)
- Place of birth: Leidschendam, Netherlands
- Position: Midfielder

Team information
- Current team: VV Noordwijk

Youth career
- Voorschoten '97
- ADO Den Haag

Senior career*
Years	Team	Apps	(Gls)
2014–2015	ADO Den Haag	1	(0)
2015−	VV Noordwijk		
- * Club domestic league appearances and goals as of 30 January 2016 (UTC)

Guy Smith (born 8 March 1996) is a Dutch footballer who played for ADO Den Haag, as a midfielder. Currently, he plays for VV Noordwijk in the Hoofdklasse B.

== Career ==
Playing at Voorschoten '97, Smith joined ADO Den Haag's youth side. He made his first team debut on 24 October 2015 against FC Dordrecht (2−0 win). He started on the bench and came in after 89 minutes as a substitute for Mathias Gehrt. In June 2015 he joined VV Noordwijk. He made his official debut for the club on 2 September 2015 in the 2−1 KNVB District Cup win over HFC EDO. His league debut followed on 12 December 2015 in the game against FC Rijnvogels.

== Career statistics ==
As of 30 January 2016.

Club	Season	League			KNVB Cup		Total	
Club	Season	Division	Apps	Goals	Apps	Goals	Apps	Goals
ADO Den Haag	2014–15	Eredivisie	1	0	0	0	1	0
