= Danny Bakker (footballer, born 16 January 1995) =

Dutch footballer (born 1995)

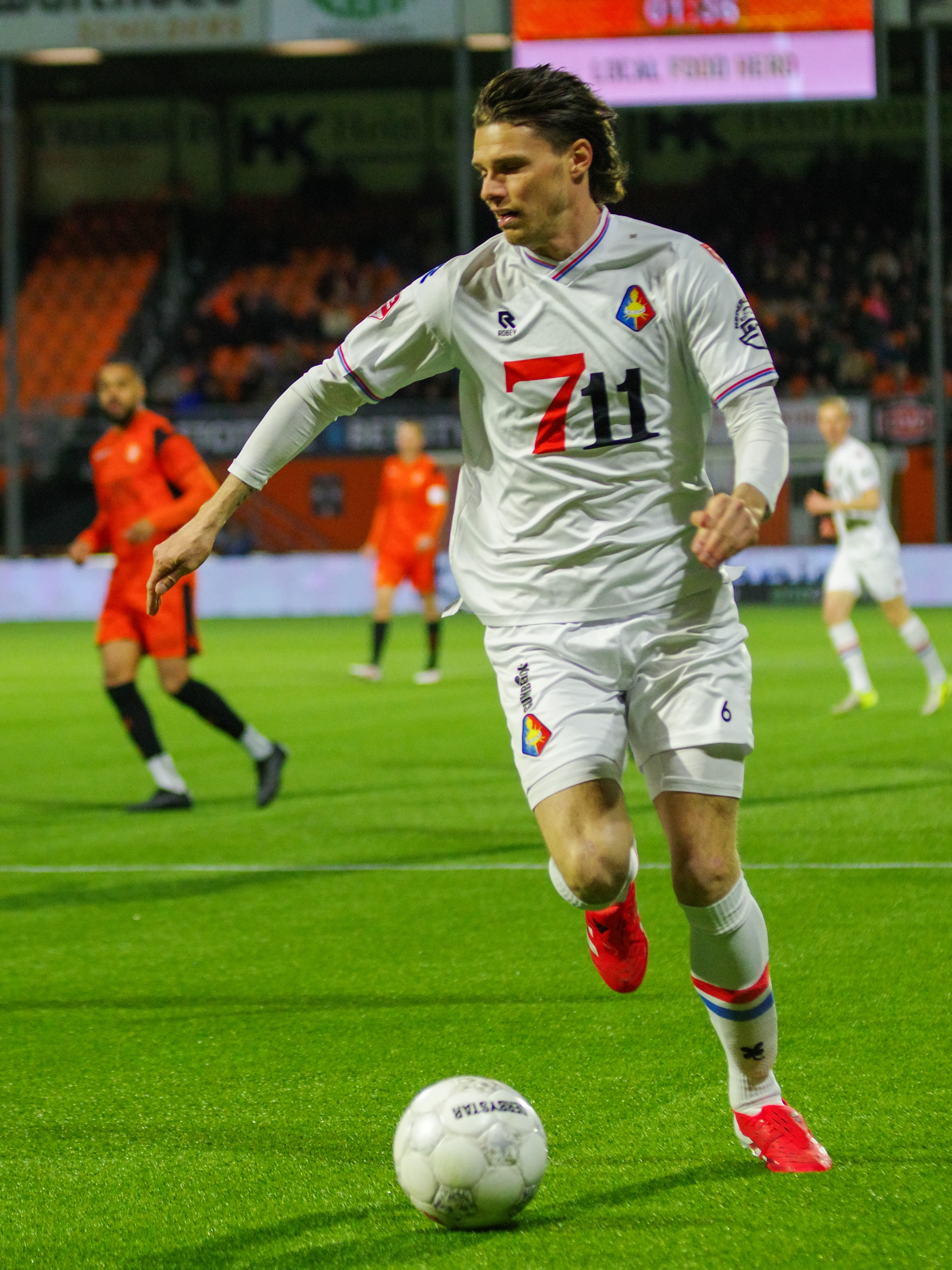
- Bakker with Telstar in 2025

Personal information
- Date of birth: 16 January 1995 (age 31)
- Place of birth: The Hague, Netherlands
- Height: 1.82 m (6 ft 0 in)
- Positions: Centre-back; defensive midfielder

Team information
- Current team: Anyang
- Number: 33

Youth career
- JuVentaS
- Laakkwartier
- 2007–2012: ADO Den Haag

Senior career*
Years	Team	Apps	(Gls)
2012–2021	ADO Den Haag	176	(10)
2020–2021	→ Roda JC (loan)	31	(3)
2021–2023	NAC Breda	31	(4)
2023–2026	Telstar	88	(11)
2026–	Anyang	11	(0)

International career
2012	Netherlands U18	1	(0)
2013–2014	Netherlands U19	3	(0)
2015	Netherlands U21	3	(0)
- * Club domestic league appearances and goals as of 11:55, 13 November 2026 (UTC)

Danny Bakker (born 16 January 1995) is a Dutch professional footballer who plays as a centre-back or defensive midfielder for K League 1 club Anyang.

A youth product of ADO Den Haag, he made over 150 appearances for the club between 2013 and 2020 before spending later spells with Roda JC and NAC Breda. Having joined Telstar in 2023, Bakker played a key role in their promotion to the Eredivisie in 2025, ending the club's 47-year absence from the top flight. Internationally, he has represented the Netherlands under-21s.

== Club career ==
=== ADO Den Haag ===
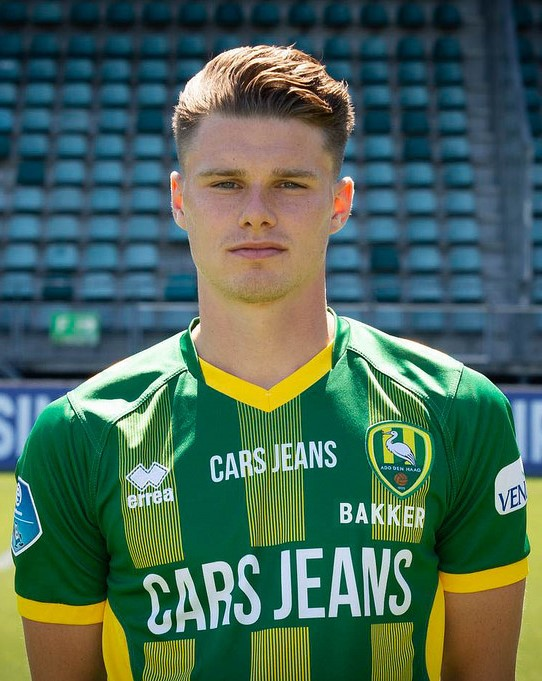
Bakker with ADO Den Haag in 2018

Bakker came through the local ranks at JuVentaS and HVV Laakkwartier in The Hague before joining the ADO Den Haag academy at under-13 level. On 20 February 2013, aged 17, he signed his first professional contract with ADO. He made his senior debut on 16 March 2013 in a home league match against Vitesse, and scored his first Eredivisie goal on 26 October 2013, opening the scoring in a 3–2 home win over Twente. He completed his HAVO diploma that same year.

Injury disrupted his progress in the 2014–15 season: after recovering from a metatarsal fracture that curtailed pre-season, he missed further time with a back problem but returned to first-team action before the winter break in a fixture against Heerenveen.

Bakker extended his contract with ADO in May 2015, committing to the club until 2018. He became a regular under head coach Henk Fraser during the 2015–16 Eredivisie campaign and decided the away match at AZ on 4 December 2015 with the only goal in a 1–0 victory.

He remained a fixture in the side in the 2016–17 season and, at the end of 2017, further extended his deal through 30 June 2021. Under Alfons Groenendijk in 2017–18 he was a consistent starter in central midfield and was occasionally deployed in defence. The following season he continued as a mainstay, and before kick-off against Vitesse on 30 March 2019 he was recognised for making his 150th official appearance for ADO's first team.

==== Loan to Roda JC ====
Bakker joined Eerste Divisie club Roda JC Kerkrade on loan for the 2020–21 season in October 2020. He made his debut for the club on 10 October, coming on as a substitute in a 2–1 away loss to Almere City. On 14 November, he scored his first goal for Roda in a 2–0 derby victory against MVV. He was a regular starter that season for Roda, scoring three goals in 34 total appearances.

=== NAC Breda ===
On 21 July 2021, Bakker joined Eerste Divisie side NAC Breda on a free transfer, signing a two-year contract following the expiry of his ADO Den Haag deal at the end of his loan with Roda JC. He made his competitive debut on the opening day of the 2021–22 season, starting in a 2–2 away draw against VVV-Venlo. On 17 September, he scored his first goal for the club, equalising shortly before half-time in a 2–1 home defeat to Emmen.

Bakker was a regular starter during his first season in Breda but was hampered by recurring injuries. In September 2022, he suffered another setback that sidelined him for most of the campaign, returning only during the promotion play-offs. Consequently, he made just two appearances in his second season with the club.

=== Telstar ===
On 31 August 2023, Bakker joined Eerste Divisie club Telstar on an amateur contract. He made his debut on 20 October, coming on as a substitute against former club NAC Breda in a 3–1 defeat. Establishing himself as a regular starter, he made 21 appearances in his first season and scored once—again against NAC, on 16 February 2024. On 29 May 2024, he signed a two-year professional contract with the club, extending his stay until 2026.

Bakker opened the 2024–25 season with two goals in a 3–2 win over Vitesse on 9 August 2024. He missed few minutes throughout the season, scoring six goals in league play and one in the KNVB Cup against Helmond Sport. Bakker featured in all four matches of the promotion play-offs, scoring in the quarter-final against ADO Den Haag and semi-final against Den Bosch. In the final against Willem II, he provided an assist in the second leg as Telstar secured promotion to the Eredivisie for the first time in 47 years.

A regular for Telstar in their return to the Eredivisie, he scored four goals in 30 league appearances, and the club secured its survival in the final round. He left at the end of the season when his contract expired.

=== Anyang ===
On 13 July 2026, Bakker signed a two-year contract with K League 1 club Anyang.

== International career ==
Bakker represented the Netherlands under-18 and under-19 sides at youth level.

On 15 May 2015, he received his first call-up to the Netherlands under-21 squad. He made an immediate impact for Jong Oranje, featuring in a 3–2 win over the Costa Rica under-23s.

== Style of play ==
Bakker is a left-footed player who has mainly operated as a central or defensive midfielder, but later is his career has also been used at centre-back. At ADO Den Haag he was described by director of football Jeffrey van As as one of the club's important players, praised for his solid play and hard work and for being able to play in multiple positions. Club statements on his move to NAC Breda later highlighted him as a left-footed central defender with excellent passing technique, capable of helping in the build-up and organising the rest of the defence.

== Career statistics ==
As of match played 7 November 2026

Appearances and goals by club, season and competition
Club	Season	League			National cup (Note: Includes KNVB Cup, Korea Cup)		Other		Total	
Club	Season	Division	Apps	Goals	Apps	Goals	Apps	Goals	Apps	Goals
ADO Den Haag	2012–13	Eredivisie	1	0	0	0	—		1	0
ADO Den Haag	2013–14	Eredivisie	23	3	1	0	—		24	3
ADO Den Haag	2014–15	Eredivisie	20	1	1	0	—		21	1
ADO Den Haag	2015–16	Eredivisie	33	3	0	0	—		33	3
ADO Den Haag	2016–17	Eredivisie	19	1	2	0	—		21	1
ADO Den Haag	2017–18	Eredivisie	34	0	0	0	2 (Note: Appearances in Eredivisie European play-offs)	0	36	0
ADO Den Haag	2018–19	Eredivisie	24	2	0	0	—		24	2
ADO Den Haag	2019–20	Eredivisie	22	0	1	0	—		23	0
ADO Den Haag	2020–21	Eredivisie	0	0	0	0	—		0	0
ADO Den Haag	Total		176	10	5	0	2	0	183	10
Roda JC (loan)	2020–21	Eerste Divisie	31	3	1	0	2 (Note: Appearance(s) in Eredivisie promotion/relegation playoffs)	0	34	3
NAC Breda	2021–22	Eerste Divisie	30	4	2	0	2	0	34	4
NAC Breda	2022–23	Eerste Divisie	1	0	0	0	1	0	2	0
NAC Breda	Total		31	4	2	0	3	0	36	4
Telstar	2023–24	Eerste Divisie	21	1	0	0	—		21	1
Telstar	2024–25	Eerste Divisie	37	6	2	1	6	2	45	9
Telstar	2025–26	Eredivisie	30	4	4	1	—		34	5
Telstar	Total		88	11	6	2	6	2	100	15
Anyang	2026	K League 1	11	0	1	0	—		12	0
Career total			337	28	15	2	13	2	365	32
