= Tyronne Ebuehi =

Nigerian footballer (born 1995)

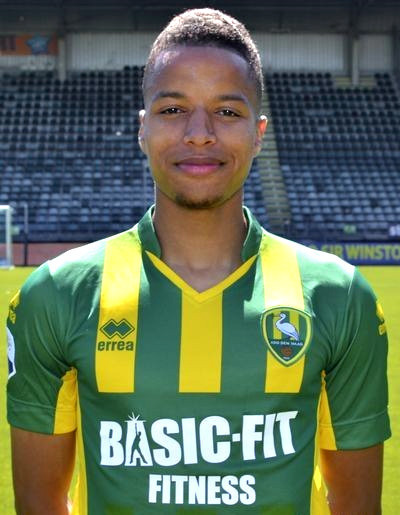
- Ebuehi with ADO Den Haag in 2015

Personal information
- Full name: Tyronne Efe Ebuehi
- Date of birth: 16 December 1995 (age 30)
- Place of birth: Haarlem, Netherlands
- Height: 1.87 m (6 ft 2 in)
- Position: Right-back

Youth career
- SV Hoofddorp
- VV Young Boys
- 2013: HFC EDO
- 2013–2014: ADO Den Haag

Senior career*
Years	Team	Apps	(Gls)
2014–2018	ADO Den Haag	78	(1)
2018–2022	Benfica	0	(0)
2019–2020	Benfica B	6	(0)
2020–2021	→ Twente (loan)	33	(1)
2021–2022	→ Venezia (loan)	19	(0)
2022–2026	Empoli	62	(3)

International career
2017–2023	Nigeria	13	(0)
- * Club domestic league appearances and goals as of 13 May 2026

Tyronne Efe Ebuehi (born 16 December 1995) is a professional footballer who plays as a right-back. Born in the Netherlands, he plays for the Nigeria national team.

== Club career ==
=== HFC EDO ===
Born in Haarlem, Ebuehi played for Dutch youth teams of several amateur clubs before joining professional team ADO Den Haag from amateur side HFC EDO in 2013. He made his Eredivisie debut on 10 August 2014 in a 1–0 home defeat to Feyenoord. Three seasons later, on 19 May 2018, he signed a five-year contract with Portuguese club S.L. Benfica. Due to injury, however, he missed the whole 2018–19 season.

=== Venzia (loan) ===
On 28 June 2021, Ebuehi joined newly promoted Serie A side Venezia on a season-long loan.

=== Empoli ===
On 5 July 2022, Ebuehi signed a contract with Empoli in Italy until June 2025.

== International career ==
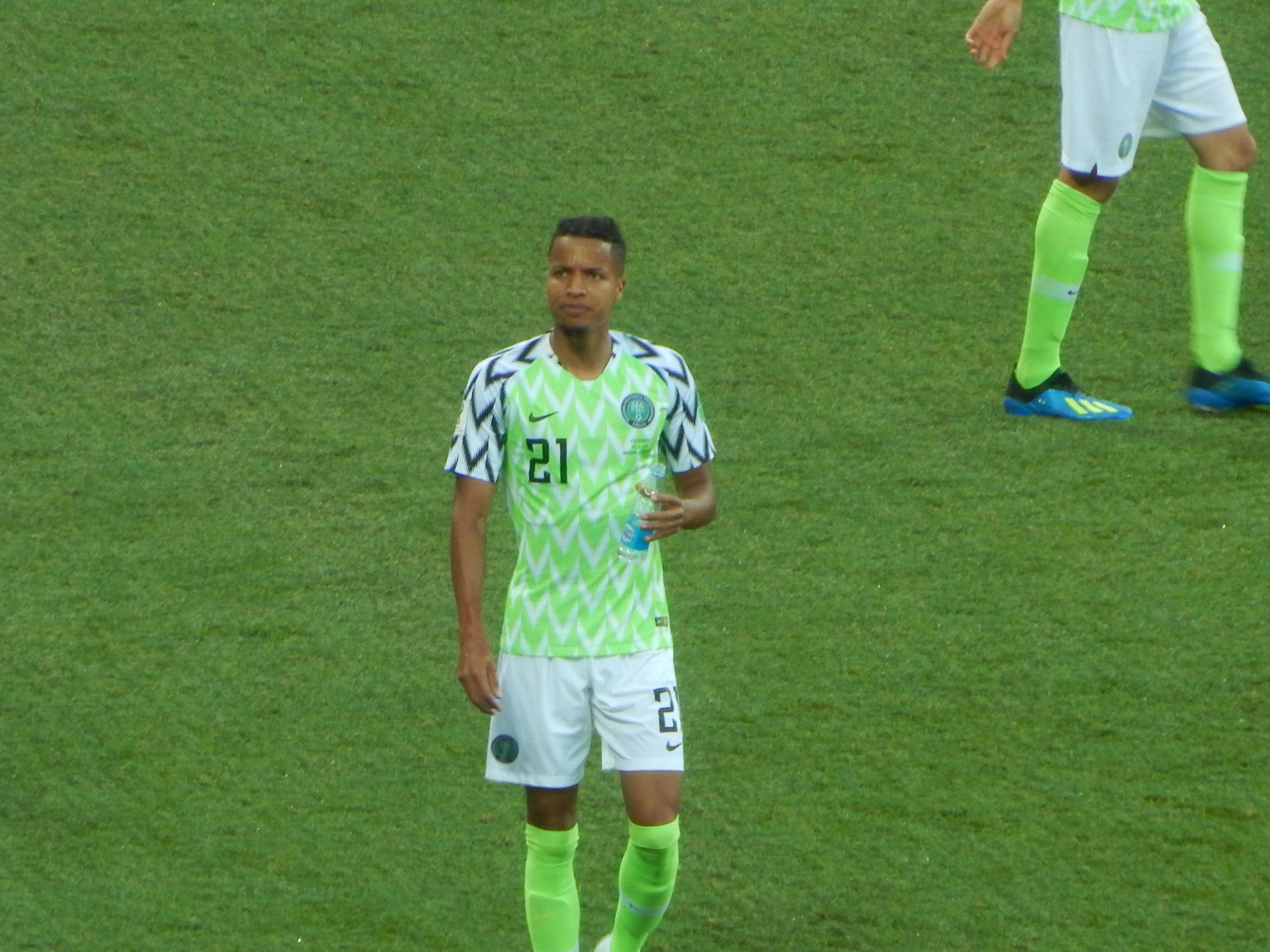
Ebuehi with Nigeria at the 2018 FIFA World Cup against Iceland

In November 2016, Ebuehi was called up for the first time to the Nigeria national team for a 2018 FIFA World Cup qualifier against Algeria. However, he declined the call-up by stating that he needed some time to settle into his team ADO Den Haag. He was later called up for friendlies against Senegal and Burkina Faso in March 2017 and joined up with the squad. He made his senior debut for Nigeria in a 3–0 friendly win over Togo on 1 June 2017.

Ebuehi was in Nigeria's 23-man squad for the World Cup in Russia. He came on as a substitute in the second half of a 2–0 victory over Iceland on 22 June 2018.

On 5 October 2019, Ebuehi got a late invite to play for the Super Eagles in a friendly against Brazil after defender Kenneth Omeruo got injured while on club duty. This marked his return to the national team since the match against Iceland in the FIFA World Cup.

== Personal life ==
Ebuehi was born in the Netherlands to a Nigerian father and a Dutch mother.

== Career statistics ==
=== Club ===
As of match played 18 May 2025

Appearances and goals by club, season and competition
Club	Season	League			National cup		Continental		Other		Total	
Club	Season	Division	Apps	Goals	Apps	Goals	Apps	Goals	Apps	Goals	Apps	Goals
ADO Den Haag	2014–15	Eredivisie	7	0	0	0	—		—		7	0
ADO Den Haag	2015–16	Eredivisie	14	0	1	0	—		—		15	0
ADO Den Haag	2016–17	Eredivisie	29	1	2	0	—		—		31	1
ADO Den Haag	2017–18	Eredivisie	28	0	1	0	—		—		29	0
ADO Den Haag	Total		78	1	4	0	—		—		82	1
Benfica	2018–19	Primeira Liga	0	0	0	0	0	0	0	0	0	0
Benfica B	2019–20	LigaPro	6	0	—		—		—		6	0
Twente (loan)	2020–21	Eredivisie	33	1	1	0	—		—		34	1
Venezia (loan)	2021–22	Serie A	19	0	1	0	—		—		20	0
Empoli	2022–23	Serie A	26	2	0	0	—		—		26	2
Empoli	2023–24	Serie A	15	0	1	0	—		—		16	0
Empoli	2024–25	Serie A	4	0	1	0	—		—		5	0
Empoli	Total		45	2	2	0	—		—		47	2
Career total			181	4	8	0	0	0	0	0	189	4

=== International ===
As of match played 13 October 2023

Appearances and goals by national team and year
National team	Year	Apps	Goals
Nigeria	2017	2	0
Nigeria	2018	6	0
Nigeria	2020	1	0
Nigeria	2021	1	0
Nigeria	2022	1	0
Nigeria	2023	2	0
Total		13	0

== Honours ==
Benfica

- Supertaça Cândido de Oliveira: 2019
