= United Vansen =

United Vansen International Sports Co., Ltd.
- Industry: Entertainment
- Founded: 2008
- Founder: Wang Hui
- Headquarters: Beijing, China

United Vansen International Sports Co., Ltd., also known as United Vansen, UVS or Wansheng, is a Chinese company based in Beijing, China that was established in 2008. The owner of the company is Wang Hui.

The company is known for its investment in football club ADO Den Haag in which it took a 99.99 percent stake for €9.2 million, and the fact that it helped organize the closing ceremony of the 2008 Beijing Olympics. Chinese investing in European football clubs has become something of a trend in the 21st century.

United Vansen's main business involves the organization of international and high-level sports competitions, which are also planned and promoted by it. For this, it collaborates with important sports organizations in Beijing. As large investment companies invest in the company, it has considerable financial resources. In 2010 United Vansen initiated enterprise football matches for the benefit of employees of companies.
