= José San Román =

Argentine footballer

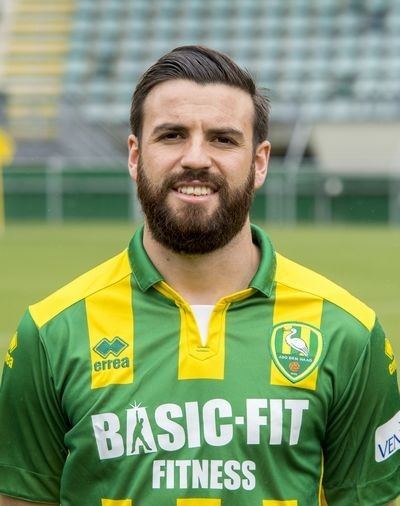

Personal information
- Full name: José Ignacio San Román
- Date of birth: August 17, 1988 (age 38)
- Place of birth: San Martín, Mendoza, Argentina
- Height: 1.71 m (5 ft 7 in)
- Position: Right back

Team information
- Current team: Lavello

Senior career*
Years	Team	Apps	(Gls)
2006	River Plate	1	(0)
2007–2010	Tigre	47	(1)
2010–2012	San Lorenzo de Almagro	6	(0)
2012	Real Zaragoza B	13	(0)
2012–2014	Godoy Cruz	48	(0)
2014–2015	Arsenal de Sarandí	18	(0)
2015–2016	Huracán	5	(0)
2016	ADO Den Haag	12	(0)
2017–2018	Newell's Old Boys	24	(0)
2018–2019	Atlético Tucumán	22	(1)
2019–2020	Nea Salamina	17	(0)
2022	Lavello	20	(0)
2022–	San Martín de Mendoza	0	(0)
- * Club domestic league appearances and goals as of 18 June 2020

José Ignacio San Román (born 17 August 1988) is an Argentine football defender currently playing for San Martín de Mendoza.

== Career ==
Born in San Martín, San Román began his professional playing career in 2006 with River Plate. He made his debut on 10 December 2006 in a 1–1 away draw with Vélez Sarsfield.

After only one game for River Plate, San Roman joined newly promoted Tigre in 2007. He made his first appearance for Tigre on 1 March 2007 in a 1–2 away win against Colón de Santa Fe. With Tigre, San Román achieved the two highest finishes in the history of the club, finishing 2nd in the Apertura 2007 championship and in joint first place in Apertura 2008 championship where they lost the three-way playoff final on goal difference. In 2009 San Román made his first appearances in an international club competition playing two games in Copa Sudamericana.

In 2010, San Román's rights were bought by a third party that loaned him to San Lorenzo for two seasons.

On 15 January 2022, San Román moved to Italy to join Serie D club Lavello. In July 2022 he moved back to Argentina in order to join hometown club San Martín de Mendoza.
