= Cyril Chevreuil =

French footballer

Personal information
- Full name: Cyril Chevreuil
- Date of birth: 20 October 1991 (age 35)
- Place of birth: Marseille, France
- Height: 1.88 m (6 ft 2 in)
- Position: Forward

Team information
- Current team: Carnoux FC

Youth career
- Marseille Endoume

Senior career*
| Years | Team | Apps | (Gls) |
| –2013 | Marseille Endoume | | |
| 2013–2015 | AS Gémenos | | |
| 2015–2016 | Aubagne | 18 | (16) |
| 2016–2017 | Sparta Rotterdam | 20 | (10) |
| 2016–2017 | Sparta Rotterdam II | 16 | (18) |
| 2017–2018 | AS Gémenos | 17 | (18) |
| 2018–2020 | Hyères | 15 | (12) |
| 2020– | Marignane GCB | | |
- * Club domestic league appearances and goals

Cyril Chevreuil (born 13 January 1990) is a French professional footballer who plays as a forward for Régional 1 club Carnoux FC. Besides France, he has played in the Netherlands.

== Career ==
Chevreuil started his career with Marseille Endoume, before signing terms with AS Gémenos. In the summer of 2015 he moved to Aubagne for a few months, before choosing to return to Gémenos.

He joined Dutch side Sparta Rotterdam in August 2016. On 22 October 2016, he made his Sparta Rotterdam debut in a 1–0 away defeat against PSV, replacing Michel Breuer in the 84th minute. His contract was terminated on 16 March 2017.

In June 2017, Chevreuil joined AS Gémenos for a third time.
