= Tim Coremans =

Dutch association football player

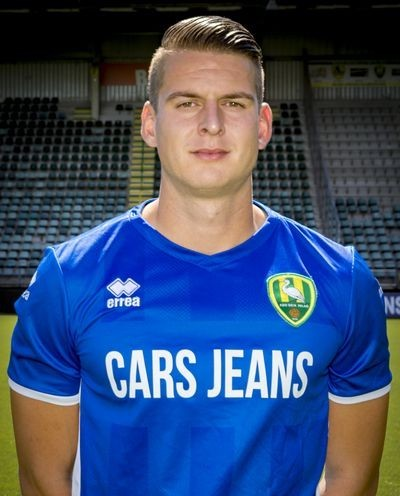
- Tim Coremans in 2017

Personal information
- Date of birth: 10 April 1991 (age 35)
- Place of birth: Breda, Netherlands
- Height: 1.87 m (6 ft 1 1/2 in)
- Position: Goalkeeper

Team information
- Current team: Dordrecht
- Number: 1

Youth career
- VV Internos
- NAC

Senior career*
Years	Team	Apps	(Gls)
2009–2013	NAC	0	(0)
2013–2014	Cambuur	0	(0)
2014–2018	ADO Den Haag	1	(0)
2016–2017	→ Dordrecht (loan)	37	(0)
2018–2023	Sparta	22	(0)
2023–2025	ADO Den Haag	11	(0)
2025–	Dordrecht	4	(0)
- * Club domestic league appearances and goals as of 28 April 2026

Tim Coremans (born 10 April 1991) is a Dutch professional footballer who plays as a goalkeeper for Eerste Divisie club Dordrecht.

== Club career ==
Coremans made his professional debut in the Eerste Divisie for Dordrecht on 5 August 2016, in a game against TOP Oss. He later had spells with ADO Den Haag and Sparta, before returning to ADO in 2023.

On 11 August 2025, Coremans returned to Dordrecht on a three-year contract.

== Career statistics ==
As of match played 3 May 2024

Appearances and goals by club, season and competition
Club	Season	League			National cup		Europe		Other		Total	
Club	Season	Division	Apps	Goals	Apps	Goals	Apps	Goals	Apps	Goals	Apps	Goals
NAC Breda	2010–11	Eredivisie	0	0	0	0	—		—		0	0
NAC Breda	2011–12	Eredivisie	0	0	0	0	—		—		0	0
NAC Breda	2012–13	Eredivisie	0	0	0	0	—		—		0	0
NAC Breda	Total		0	0	0	0	—		—		0	0
Cambuur	2012–13	Eredivisie	0	0	0	0	—		—		0	0
ADO Den Haag	2014–15	Eredivisie	0	0	0	0	—		—		0	0
ADO Den Haag	2015–16	Eredivisie	0	0	0	0	—		—		0	0
ADO Den Haag	2017–18	Eredivisie	1	0	0	0	—		—		1	0
ADO Den Haag	Total		1	0	0	0	—		—		1	0
Dordrecht (loan)	2017–18	Eerste Divisie	37	0	0	0	—		—		37	0
Jong Sparta Rotterdam	2018–19	Eerste Divisie	13	0	—		—		—		13	0
Sparta Rotterdam	2019–20	Eredivisie	10	0	1	0	—		—		11	0
Sparta Rotterdam	2021–22	Eredivisie	3	0	1	0	—		—		4	0
Sparta Rotterdam	2022–23	Eredivisie	0	0	0	0	—		—		0	0
Sparta Rotterdam	Total		13	0	2	0	—		—		15	0
ADO Den Haag	2023–24	Eerste Divisie	5	0	2	0	—		—		7	0
Career total			69	0	4	0	0	0	0	0	73	0
