= Dion Malone =

Surinamese footballer (born 1989)

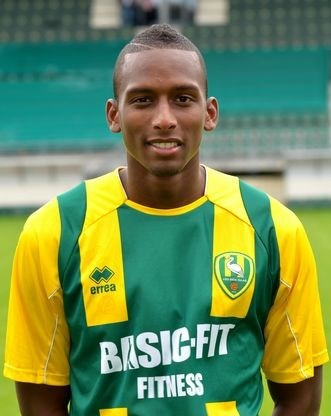
- Malone with ADO Den Haag in 2012

Personal information
- Full name: Dion Omar Rudchell Malone
- Date of birth: 13 February 1989 (age 37)
- Place of birth: Paramaribo, Suriname
- Height: 1.85 m (6 ft 1 in)
- Positions: Midfielder; right-back

Senior career*
Years	Team	Apps	(Gls)
2008–2012	Almere City	77	(2)
2012–2017	ADO Den Haag	129	(5)
2017–2018	Gabala	18	(0)
2018–2020	ADO Den Haag	49	(1)
2020–2022	NAC Breda	65	(2)
2022–2025	Karmiotissa	94	(2)
2025–2026	Telstar	11	(0)
Total		443	(12)

International career
2021–2026	Suriname	32	(0)
- * Club domestic league appearances and goals

Dion Omar Rudchell Malone (born 13 February 1989) is a Surinamese former professional footballer who played as a midfielder or right-back. He also captained the Suriname national team.

== Club career ==
Born in Paramaribo, Suriname, Malone made his professional debut for Almere City (then called FC Omniworld) in the 2008–09 season.

On 24 June 2017, Malone signed a two-year contract with Azerbaijan Premier League side Gabala FK.

On 27 July 2018, it was announced Malone had returned to ADO Den Haag, having signed a two-year contract.

Malone joined Cypriot First Division club Karmiotissa on 19 July 2022, signing a one-year deal.

On 8 August 2025, Malone joined newly promoted Eredivisie club Telstar on amateur terms, marking his return to the Netherlands. He made his competitive debut two days later, replacing Tyrone Owusu in the 85th minute of a 2–0 away defeat to Ajax at the Johan Cruyff Arena on the opening matchday of the 2025–26 season. He announced his retirement at the end of the season but remained at Telstar as team manager under new head coach Henk Brugge.

== International career ==
He made his debut for Suriname national football team on 24 March 2021 in a World Cup qualifier against the Cayman Islands. On 25 June 2021, Malone was named to the Surinamese squad for the 2021 CONCACAF Gold Cup.

As of June 2025, he was the captain of the Surinamese football team.

== Career statistics ==
Appearances and goals by club, season and competition
Club	Season	League			National cup		Other		Total	
Club	Season	Division	Apps	Goals	Apps	Goals	Apps	Goals	Apps	Goals
Omniworld	2008–09	Eerste Divisie	7	0	0	0	—		7	0
Omniworld	2009–10	Eerste Divisie	14	0	0	0	—		14	0
Almere City	2010–11	Eerste Divisie	25	2	1	0	—		26	2
Almere City	2011–12	Eerste Divisie	31	0	2	1	—		33	1
Almere City	Total		77	2	3	1	—		80	3
ADO Den Haag	2012–13	Eredivisie	26	0	2	0	—		28	0
ADO Den Haag	2013–14	Eredivisie	32	1	2	0	—		33	1
ADO Den Haag	2014–15	Eredivisie	33	0	1	0	—		34	0
ADO Den Haag	2015–16	Eredivisie	25	1	1	0	—		26	1
ADO Den Haag	2016–17	Eredivisie	13	3	0	0	—		13	3
ADO Den Haag	Total		129	5	6	0	—		135	5
Gabala	2017–18	Azerbaijan Premier League	18	0	0	0	3 (Note: Appearances in UEFA Europa League)	0	21	0
ADO Den Haag	2018–19	Eredivisie	29	1	2	0	—		31	1
ADO Den Haag	2019–20	Eredivisie	20	0	1	0	—		21	0
ADO Den Haag	Total		49	1	3	0	—		52	1
NAC Breda	2020–21	Eerste Divisie	33	1	0	0	3 (Note: Appearances in Eredivisie promotion/relegation playoffs)	0	36	1
NAC Breda	2021–22	Eerste Divisie	32	1	4	0	2	0	38	1
NAC Breda	Total		65	2	4	0	5	0	74	2
Karmiotissa	2022–23	Cypriot First Division	35	2	1	0	—		36	2
Karmiotissa	2023–24	Cypriot First Division	34	0	1	0	—		35	0
Karmiotissa	2024–25	Cypriot First Division	25	0	1	0	—		26	0
Karmiotissa	Total		94	2	3	0	—		97	2
Telstar	2025–26	Eredivisie	11	0	0	0	—		11	0
Career total			443	12	19	1	8	0	470	13
