= Tom Beugelsdijk =

Dutch footballer (born 1990)

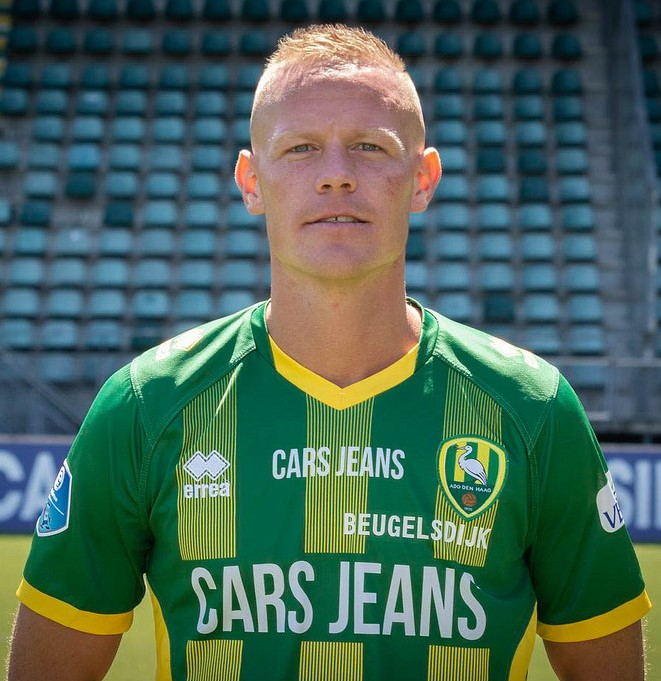
- Tom Beugelsdijk in 2018

Personal information
- Date of birth: 7 August 1990 (age 36)
- Place of birth: The Hague, Netherlands
- Height: 1.92 m (6 ft 4 in)
- Position: Centre-back

Youth career
- RVC Rijswijk
- 2000-2010: ADO Den Haag

Senior career*
| Years | Team | Apps | (Gls) |
| 2010–2014 | ADO Den Haag | 57 | (2) |
| 2010–2012 | → Dordrecht (loan) | 54 | (6) |
| 2014–2015 | FSV Frankfurt | 25 | (1) |
| 2015–2020 | ADO Den Haag | 121 | (8) |
| 2020–2022 | Sparta | 55 | (2) |
| 2022–2023 | Helmond Sport | 13 | (0) |
| 2024–2025 | Scheveningen | 43 | (0) |
- * Club domestic league appearances and goals as of 1 July 2025

Tom Beugelsdijk (Dutch pronunciation: [ˌtɔm ˈbøːɣəlzˌdɛik]; 7 August 1990) is a Dutch former footballer who played as a centre-back for Scheveningen.

== Club career ==
Beugelsdijk was born in The Hague. He formerly played for ADO Den Haag and was loaned out to FC Dordrecht, in the Dutch second division, the Eerste Divisie during the 2010–11 and 2011–12 season.

In the summer of 2011, he returned to ADO Den Haag and he was one of the selected in the first Europa League match of ADO against FK Tauras.

=== FSV Frankfurt ===
After being linked with Birmingham City, including being shown round the stadium, It was announced by German side FSV Frankfurt's Twitter that on 21 May 2014, Tom Beugelsdijk was joining them from ADO Den Haag on a free transfer.

=== ADO Den Haag ===
After a year in Germany, in 2015 Beugelsdijk returned to ADO Den Haag where he became a cult hero at the club due to his fighting mentality.

=== Sparta Rotterdam ===
Beugelsdijk joined Sparta on 14 August 2020, signing two-year contract.

In July 2022, he was suspended for five matches after betting on games in which he himself participated.

=== Helmond Sport ===
Beugelsdijk signed a three-year contract with Eerste Divisie club Helmond Sport on 16 July 2022. The contract was terminated early by mutual consent on 27 June 2023.

=== SVV Scheveningen ===
On 2 January 2024, Beugelsdijk joined SVV Scheveningen as a free agent on a six-month contract, with an option to extend with the Tweede Divisie side if it was deemed favourable for both parties. At the end of the 2024–2025 season, Beugelsdijk left Scheveningen after announcing his retirement.

== Career statistics ==
As of match played 1 July 2025

Appearances and goals by club, season and competition
| Club | Season | League | | | National Cup | | Other | | Total | |
| Club | Season | Division | Apps | Goals | Apps | Goals | Apps | Goals | Apps | Goals |
|---|---|---|---|---|---|---|---|---|---|---|
| FC Dordrecht (loan) | 2010–11 | Eerste Divisie | 28 | 4 | 2 | 0 | 0 | 0 | 30 | 4 |
| FC Dordrecht (loan) | 2011–12 | Eerste Divisie | 26 | 2 | 1 | 0 | 0 | 0 | 27 | 2 |
| FC Dordrecht (loan) | Total | | 54 | 6 | 3 | 0 | 0 | 0 | 57 | 6 |
| ADO Den Haag | 2012–13 | Eredivisie | 28 | 2 | 2 | 0 | 0 | 0 | 30 | 2 |
| ADO Den Haag | 2013–14 | Eredivisie | 30 | 4 | 2 | 0 | 0 | 0 | 32 | 4 |
| ADO Den Haag | Total | | 58 | 6 | 4 | 0 | 0 | 0 | 62 | 6 |
| FSV Frankfurt | 2014-15 | 2. Bundesliga | 25 | 1 | 2 | 0 | 0 | 0 | 27 | 1 |
| FSV Frankfurt | Total | | 25 | 1 | 2 | 0 | 0 | 0 | 27 | 1 |
| ADO Den Haag | 2015–16 | Eredivisie | 24 | 2 | 0 | 0 | 0 | 0 | 24 | 2 |
| ADO Den Haag | 2016–17 | Eredivisie | 28 | 3 | 3 | 0 | 0 | 0 | 31 | 3 |
| ADO Den Haag | 2017–18 | Eredivisie | 24 | 2 | 1 | 0 | 2 | 0 | 27 | 2 |
| ADO Den Haag | 2018–19 | Eredivisie | 26 | 0 | 2 | 1 | 0 | 0 | 28 | 1 |
| ADO Den Haag | 2019–20 | Eredivisie | 19 | 1 | 1 | 0 | 0 | 0 | 20 | 1 |
| ADO Den Haag | Total | | 121 | 8 | 7 | 1 | 2 | 0 | 130 | 9 |
| Sparta Rotterdam | 2020–21 | Eredivisie | 30 | 2 | 1 | 0 | 0 | 0 | 31 | 2 |
| Sparta Rotterdam | 2021–22 | Eredivisie | 25 | 0 | 2 | 0 | 0 | 0 | 27 | 0 |
| Sparta Rotterdam | Total | | 55 | 2 | 3 | 0 | 0 | 0 | 58 | 2 |
| Helmond Sport | 2022–23 | Eerste Divisie | 12 | 0 | 0 | 0 | 0 | 0 | 12 | 0 |
| Helmond Sport | Total | | 12 | 0 | 0 | 0 | 0 | 0 | 12 | 0 |
| SVV Scheveningen | 2023-24 | Tweede Divisie | 14 | 0 | 0 | 0 | 0 | 0 | 14 | 0 |
| SVV Scheveningen | 2024-25 | Tweede Divisie | 25 | 0 | 0 | 0 | 4 | 0 | 29 | 0 |
| SVV Scheveningen | Total | | 39 | 0 | 0 | 0 | 4 | 0 | 43 | 0 |
| Career total | | | 364 | 23 | 19 | 1 | 6 | 0 | 389 | 24 |

== Political career ==
In March 2026, Beugelsdijk was voted in the municipal council of The Hague being member of the local Hart voor Den Haag party. He resigned after 203 days in office, because he was unable to move to The Hague due to changes in his private circumstances and his arrangements for seeing his children.
