= Dennis van der Heijden =

Dutch footballer (born 1997)

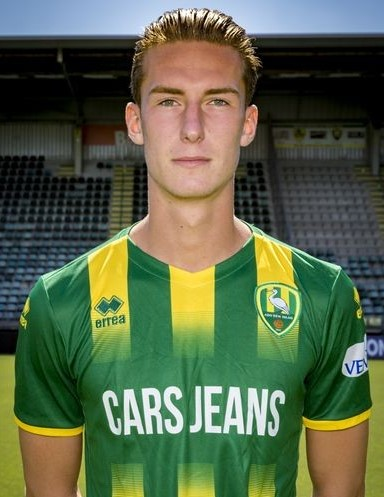
- Dennis van der Heijden with ADO Den Haag in 2017

Personal information
- Full name: Dennis van der Heijden
- Date of birth: 17 February 1997 (age 29)
- Place of birth: Schiedam, Netherlands
- Height: 1.91 m (6 ft 3 in)
- Position: Forward

Team information
- Current team: 's-Gravenzande

Youth career
- 2004–2012: Feyenoord
- 2012–2014: Dordrecht
- 2014–2016: ADO Den Haag

Senior career*
Years	Team	Apps	(Gls)
2016–2017	ADO Den Haag	25	(2)
2017	→ FC Volendam (loan)	9	(3)
2017–2018	Almere City	29	(7)
2018–2021	Carpi	2	(0)
2019	→ Fermana (loan)	10	(0)
2020–2021	→ TOP Oss (loan)	42	(9)
2021–2022	Chrobry Głogów	31	(3)
2022–2025	Capelle		
2025–2026	Barendrecht	28	(3)
2026–	's-Gravenzande		

International career
2016	Netherlands U19	3	(1)
2016	Netherlands U20	5	(4)
- * Club domestic league appearances and goals as of 20:49, 9 September 2026 (UTC)

Dennis van der Heijden (born 17 February 1997) is a Dutch footballer who plays for as a forward for Vierde Divisie side 's-Gravenzande. He has played for the Netherlands U20 national football team.

He scored twice on his professional debut for ADO Den Haag but failed to score again in the Eredivisie over the next year and half. As a result, he spent the remainder of his second season with the club on loan at Volendam before signing a permanent deal with fellow Eerste Divisie side Almere City at the end of the season. There he spent a further season before relocating to Italy to join Carpi in 2018.

== Club career ==
=== ADO Den Haag ===
Van der Heijden made his debut for ADO Den Haag on 14 February 2016 against Excelsior. He was brought on as substitute for Vito Wormgoor in the 77th minute, with Den Haag trailing 2–1, and scored twice to help the club complete a 4–2 come-from-behind victory. In doing so he became the first player to net a brace for the club on debut since Dmitri Bulykin in 2010. On 24 March, van der Heijden signed his first professional contract, signing a three-and-a-half-year deal. He ended the season with nine appearances and two goals to his name as The Hague finished 11th in the Eredivisie. On 17 June, van der Heijden was named runner-up for ADO Den Haag's Goal of the Season award for his goal against Excelsior, losing out by 4% to club goalkeeper Martin Hansen.

==== Loan to Volendam ====
Van Der Heijden scored his first goal of the season on his KNVB Cup debut in a 2–1 win over Telstar on 25 October 2016, coming off the bench to score the winner in the 81st minute of the match. He failed to score in 16 Eredivisie appearances by January though, and at the end of the month was loaned to Eerste Divisie side Volendam. He made his debut for the club on 3 February 2017, starting in a 3–1 loss to Emmen and scored his first goal ten days later, netting Volendam's opener in a 4–2 win over Utrecht II. He ultimately made 9 appearances for the season and scored 3 goals as Volendam were defeated in the promotion play-offs by NAC Breda.

=== Almere City FC ===
On 31 August 2017, van der Heijden signed a one-year contract with Eerste Divisie side Almere City. He scored his first goals for the club on 22 September, netting a second-half brace to earn Almere a 2–2 come-from-behind draw with Oss. He ultimately recorded a return of seven goals for the league campaign in what proved to be his only season with Almere.

=== Carpi ===
On 3 July 2018, van der Heijden signed a four-year contract with Italian side, Carpi. On 22 June 2021 he left the club by mutual agreement.

==== Loan to Fermana ====
On 31 January 2019, he joined Fermana on loan until the end of the 2018–19 season.

==== Loan to TOP Oss ====
On 31 January 2020, he returned to the Netherlands, joining TOP Oss on loan until the end of the season. The deal was extended for an extra season in August 2020.

=== Chrobry Głogów ===
On 24 June 2021, Van der Heijden signed with Polish club Chrobry Głogów.

=== VV Capelle ===
Following the conclusion of the 2021–22 season, van der Heijden returned to Holland to join Vierde Divisie side Capelle. He then played for Barendrecht before leaving them for 's-Gravenzande in summer 2026. He lives in Maassluis. Alongside playing amateur football, he works for a real estate company.

== International career ==
=== Netherlands national youth teams ===
Following his breakthrough with ADO Den Haag earlier in the preceding league campaign, van der Heijden was named in Aron Winter's side for the U19 European Championship. He made his debut for the Netherlands U19 side in their opening match of the tournament on 12 July, coming on as a late substitute for Steven Bergwijn in a 3–1 win over Croatia. He scored his first goal for the U19's in Netherlands' final match at the tournament, which ultimately ended in a penalty-shootout loss against Germany which saw them fail to qualify for the 2017 FIFA U-20 World Cup.

On 7 October 2016, van der Heijden scored four goals for Netherlands U20 in a 5–3 win over the United States in a Four Nations Tournament.

== Career statistics ==
As of 17 May 2018

Appearances and goals by club, season and competition
Club	Season	League			FA Cup		League Cup		Other		Total	
Club	Season	Division	Apps	Goals	Apps	Goals	Apps	Goals	Apps	Goals	Apps	Goals
ADO Den Haag	2015–16	Eredivisie	9	2	0	0	0	0	0	0	9	2
ADO Den Haag	2016–17	Eredivisie	14	0	1	1	0	0	0	0	15	1
Total			23	2	1	1	0	0	0	0	24	3
Volendam (loan)	2016–17	Eerste Divisie	9	3	0	0	0	0	0	0	9	3
Total			9	3	0	0	0	0	0	0	9	3
Almere City	2017–18	Eerste Divisie	29	7	2	0	0	0	0	0	31	7
Career total			61	11	3	1	0	0	0	0	64	12
