= Kevin Jansen =

Dutch footballer (born 1992)

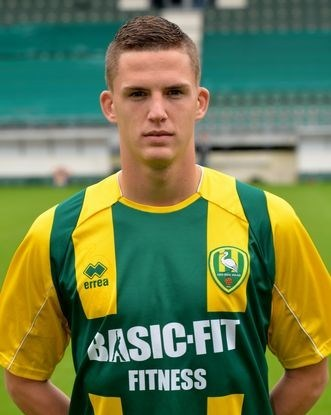
- Jansen with ADO Den Haag

Personal information
- Full name: Kevin Johnny Jansen
- Date of birth: 8 April 1992 (age 34)
- Place of birth: Hoogvliet, Netherlands
- Height: 1.83 m (6 ft 0 in)
- Position: Midfielder

Team information
- Current team: Inter Turku II (player-coach)

Youth career
- –2000: VV Rijnmond Hoogvliet Sport
- 2000–2011: Feyenoord

Senior career*
Years	Team	Apps	(Gls)
2011–2012	Feyenoord	0	(0)
2011–2012	→ Excelsior (loan)	26	(0)
2012–2017	ADO Den Haag	98	(8)
2017–2019	NEC Nijmegen	21	(0)
2019	Cambuur	18	(1)
2019	Gol Gohar	5	(0)
2020	Quick Boys	4	(0)
2020–2021	Dordrecht	35	(7)
2021	PAEEK	9	(1)
2022–2023	Honka	45	(8)
2024	Inter Turku	8	(0)
2025–	Inter Turku II (player-coach)	0	(0)

International career
2013	Netherlands U21	1	(0)
- * Club domestic league appearances and goals as of 23 October 2024

Kevin Johnny Jansen (born 8 April 1992) is a Dutch professional footballer who plays as a midfielder and is currently a player-coach for Finnish club Inter Turku II.

== Career ==
Jansen made his professional debut for Excelsior on 5 August 2011, as he replaced Jason Oost in the 79th minute of the Eredivisie home match against Feyenoord (2–0).

In 2019, he played for Gol Gohar in Iran.

On 25 June 2020, FC Dordrecht confirmed the signing of Jansen on a two-year deal.

In June 2021, it was announced that Jansen had signed with Cypriot First Division club PAEEK.

On 29 December 2021, Honka in Finland announced that they had signed with Jansen on a two-year deal, starting in January 2022. His contract was extended on 1 August 2023, on a deal until the end of 2025. After the 2023 season, Honka was suddenly declared for bankruptcy, and Jansen became a free agent.

On 3 January 2024, a fellow Veikkausliiga club Inter Turku announced the signing of Jansen on a one-year deal, with an option for an additional year. Jansen will reunite with Vesa Vasara, his previous head coach in Honka.

On 24 January 2025, Jansen started as a player-coach of Inter Turku reserve team in thir-tier Ykkönen.

== Career statistics ==
As of 23 October 2024

Appearances and goals by club, season and competition
Club	Season	League			National cup (Note: Includes KNVB Beker, Iranian Hazfi Cup, Suomen Cup)		Continental		Other		Total	
Club	Season	Division	Apps	Goals	Apps	Goals	Apps	Goals	Apps	Goals	Apps	Goals
Excelsior (loan)	2011–12	Eredivisie	26	0	1	0	–		–		27	0
ADO Den Haag	2012–13	Eredivisie	31	2	1	0	–		–		32	2
ADO Den Haag	2013–14	Eredivisie	3	0	–		–		–		3	0
ADO Den Haag	2014–15	Eredivisie	25	0	1	0	–		–		26	0
ADO Den Haag	2015–16	Eredivisie	28	5	1	0	–		–		29	5
ADO Den Haag	2016–17	Eredivisie	11	1	1	0	–		–		12	1
ADO Den Haag	Total		98	8	4	0	–	–	–	–	102	8
NEC Nijmegen	2017–18	Eerste Divisie	19	0	2	0	–		2 (Note: Includes Eredivisie Promotion Play-offs)	0	23	0
NEC Nijmegen	2018–19	Eerste Divisie	2	0	1	0	–		–		3	0
NEC Nijmegen	Total		23	0	3	0	–	–	–	–	26	0
Cambuur	2018–19	Eerste Divisie	18	1	–		–		4 (Note: Includes Eredivisie Promotion Play-offs)	0	22	1
Gol Gohar	2019–20	Persian Gulf Pro League	5	0	1	0	–		–		6	0
Quick Boys	2019–20	Tweede Divisie	4	0	–		–		–		4	0
Dordrecht	2020–21	Eerste Divisie	35	7	–		–		–		35	7
PAEEK	2021–22	Cypriot First Division	9	1	–		–		–		9	1
Honka	2022	Veikkausliiga	25	4	1	0	–		6 (Note: Includes Finnish League Cup)	1	32	5
Honka	2023	Veikkausliiga	20	4	2	0	0	0	5	0	27	4
Honka	Total		45	8	3	0	0	0	11	1	59	9
Inter Turku	2024	Veikkausliiga	8	0	1	0	–		4	1	13	1
Inter Turku II	2025	Ykkönen	0	0	0	0	–		–		0	0
Career total			271	25	13	0	0	0	21	2	305	27
