= Édouard Duplan =

French footballer (born 1983)

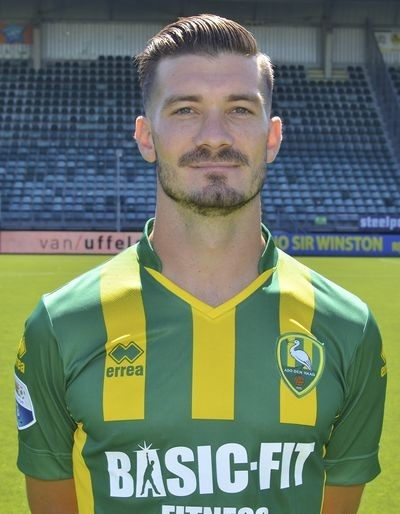
- Duplan with ADO Den Haag in 2015

Personal information
- Date of birth: 13 May 1983 (age 43)
- Place of birth: Athis-Mons, France
- Height: 1.80 m (5 ft 11 in)
- Position: Winger

Youth career
- Arcueil C.O. Municipal

Senior career*
Years	Team	Apps	(Gls)
2003–2004	Choisy-le-Roi	29	(2)
2004–2005	ES Viry-Châtillon	15	(3)
2005–2006	Clermont	21	(3)
2006–2007	RBC Roosendaal	40	(7)
2007–2010	Sparta Rotterdam	73	(5)
2010–2015	Utrecht	100	(23)
2015–2018	ADO Den Haag	77	(5)
2018–2019	Sparta Rotterdam	11	(0)
2019–2020	Westlandia	17	(3)
Total		383	(51)
- * Club domestic league appearances and goals

Édouard Duplan (born 13 May 1983) is a French former professional footballer who played as a winger. During his career, he played for RBC Roosendaal, Sparta Rotterdam, Utrecht, ADO Den Haag, and RKVV Westlandia in the Netherlands after starting his career in his native France with Choisy Le Roi, ES Viry-Châtillon, and Clermont Foot.

== Club career ==
Born in Athis-Mons, Essonne, Duplan began his career at Choisy-le-Roi before gaining recognition at Clermont Foot. During his early amateur years, he studied philosophy at Lycée Marcel Pagnol Athis-Mons. In 2006, he moved to Dutch club RBC Roosendaal, where he quickly became a fan favourite, leading to a transfer to Sparta Rotterdam in 2007. Unfortunately, a serious injury in his debut match cut short his first season.

In the summer of 2010, Duplan joined Utrecht. Following the 2011–12 season, he won the David di Tommaso Trophy, awarded by Utrecht's supporters who voted him the club's best player of the season.

Duplan retired from football in 2020 while playing for amateur club Westlandia. After retiring, he began studying to become a furniture maker.
