= Trevor David =

Dutch footballer (born 1997)

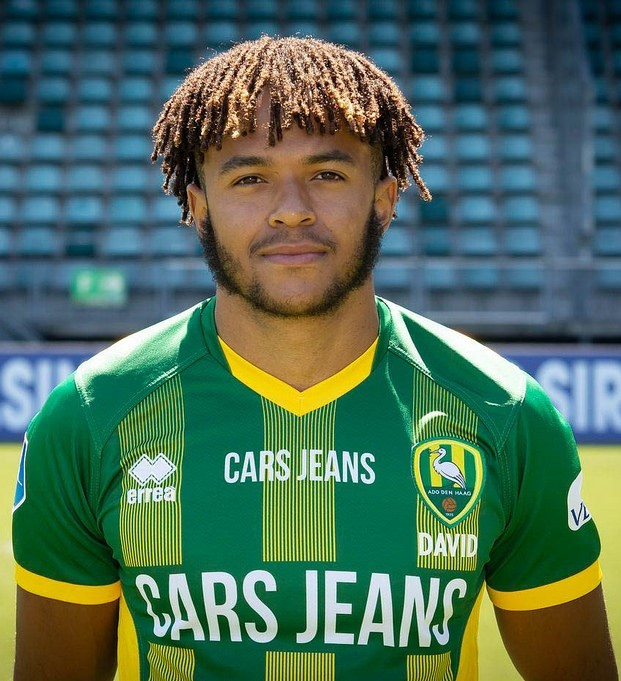
- Trevor David in 2018

Personal information
- Date of birth: 28 January 1997 (age 29)
- Place of birth: Voorburg, Netherlands
- Height: 1.80 m (5 ft 11 in)
- Position: Right-back

Youth career
- HVV ODB
- 2004–2016: ADO Den Haag

Senior career*
| Years | Team | Apps | (Gls) |
| 2016–2019 | ADO Den Haag | 10 | (0) |
| 2020–2021 | TOP Oss | 40 | (0) |
| 2022–2023 | TOP Oss | 20 | (2) |
- * Club domestic league appearances and goals as of 24 June 2023

Trevor David (born 28 January 1997) is a Dutch retired footballer who played as a right-back.

== Club career ==
=== ADO Den Haag ===
David made his professional debut in the Eredivisie for ADO Den Haag on 14 January 2017 in a game against SC Heerenveen.

In July 2018, he tore his cruciate ligament which sidelined him for an extended period of time.

=== TOP Oss ===
After being a free agent for a year, David signed a two-year contract with TOP Oss on 13 August 2020. He made his debut for the club on 29 August as a starter in a 1–2 home loss to Helmond Sport. David quickly established himself as a starter at right-back for the club, making 30 appearances in his first season, as TOP Oss finished 10th in the league table.

In late October 2021, David announced his retirement from professional football citing a desire to "find a new path in life".

David came out of retirement on 11 July 2022, and signed with TOP Oss again.

== Career statistics ==
As of match played 28 April 2023

Appearances and goals by club, season and competition
| Club | Season | League | | | Cup | | Other | | Total | |
| Club | Season | Division | Apps | Goals | Apps | Goals | Apps | Goals | Apps | Goals |
|---|---|---|---|---|---|---|---|---|---|---|
| ADO Den Haag | 2016–17 | Eredivisie | 3 | 0 | 0 | 0 | — | | 3 | 0 |
| ADO Den Haag | 2017–18 | Eredivisie | 7 | 0 | 1 | 0 | — | | 8 | 0 |
| ADO Den Haag | 2018–19 | Eredivisie | 0 | 0 | 0 | 0 | — | | 0 | 0 |
| ADO Den Haag | Total | | 10 | 0 | 1 | 0 | 0 | 0 | 11 | 0 |
| TOP Oss | 2020–21 | Eerste Divisie | 30 | 0 | 1 | 0 | — | | 31 | 0 |
| TOP Oss | 2021–22 | Eerste Divisie | 10 | 0 | 0 | 0 | — | | 10 | 0 |
| TOP Oss | 2022–23 | Eerste Divisie | 20 | 2 | 1 | 0 | — | | 21 | 2 |
| TOP Oss | Total | | 60 | 2 | 2 | 0 | 0 | 0 | 62 | 2 |
| Career total | | | 70 | 2 | 3 | 0 | 0 | 0 | 73 | 2 |
