= Mathias Gehrt =

Danish footballer (born 1992)

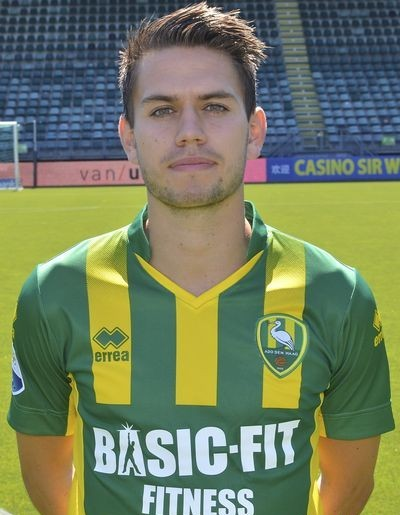

Personal information
- Full name: Mathias Krathmann Gehrt
- Date of birth: 7 June 1992 (age 34)
- Place of birth: Copenhagen, Denmark
- Height: 1.72 m (5 ft 8 in)
- Position: Attacking midfielder

Youth career
- BK Skjold
- Nivå-Kokkedal FK
- Nordsjælland
- Brøndby

Senior career*
Years	Team	Apps	(Gls)
2011–2013	Brøndby	55	(8)
2013–2016	ADO Den Haag	35	(8)
2016–2017	Helsingør	8	(1)
2017–2018	Roskilde	44	(6)
2018–2023	Nykøbing	117	(17)
2023–2024	Hvidovre	15	(0)

International career
2007–2008	Denmark U-16	3	(0)
2008–2009	Denmark U-17	4	(0)
2009–2010	Denmark U-18	2	(0)
2011–2011	Denmark U-19	2	(0)
2011–2012	Denmark U-20	6	(0)
2013–2014	Denmark U-21	5	(0)
- * Club domestic league appearances and goals as of 5 December 2024

Mathias Krathmann Gehrt (born 7 June 1992) is a Danish retired professional footballer who played as a midfielder.

== Club career ==
Born in Copenhagen, Mathias Gehrt was a Brøndby IF youth graduate, and made his debut with the first team on 6 March 2011, coming on as a 64th-minute substitute for Ousman Jallow in a 1–1 home draw against Lyngby. Gehrt scored his first senior goal against Silkeborg on 3 April, netting the first of a 2–2 home draw.

On 22 August 2013, Gehrt signed a two-year deal with ADO Den Haag.

On 31 August 2016, Gehrt cut ties with ADO. A few weeks later, he signed with Danish 1st Division side FC Helsingør on a deal for the rest of 2016, after a successful tryout. However, his contract was not extended, and he subsequently signed a two-year deal with FC Roskilde.

On 1 September 2018, he signed a deal with Nykøbing FC. After five season in Nykøbing, Gehrt signed with newly promoted Danish Superliga club Hvidovre IF in June 2023. On 23 December 2024 Hvidovre confirmed that they had terminated the contract with Gehrt, and just three days later, the 32-year-old Gehrt himself confirmed that he had chosen to end his career and would focus on his civilian career.
