= ADO Den Haag Stadium =

Stadium in The Hague, the Netherlands

WerkTalent Stadion
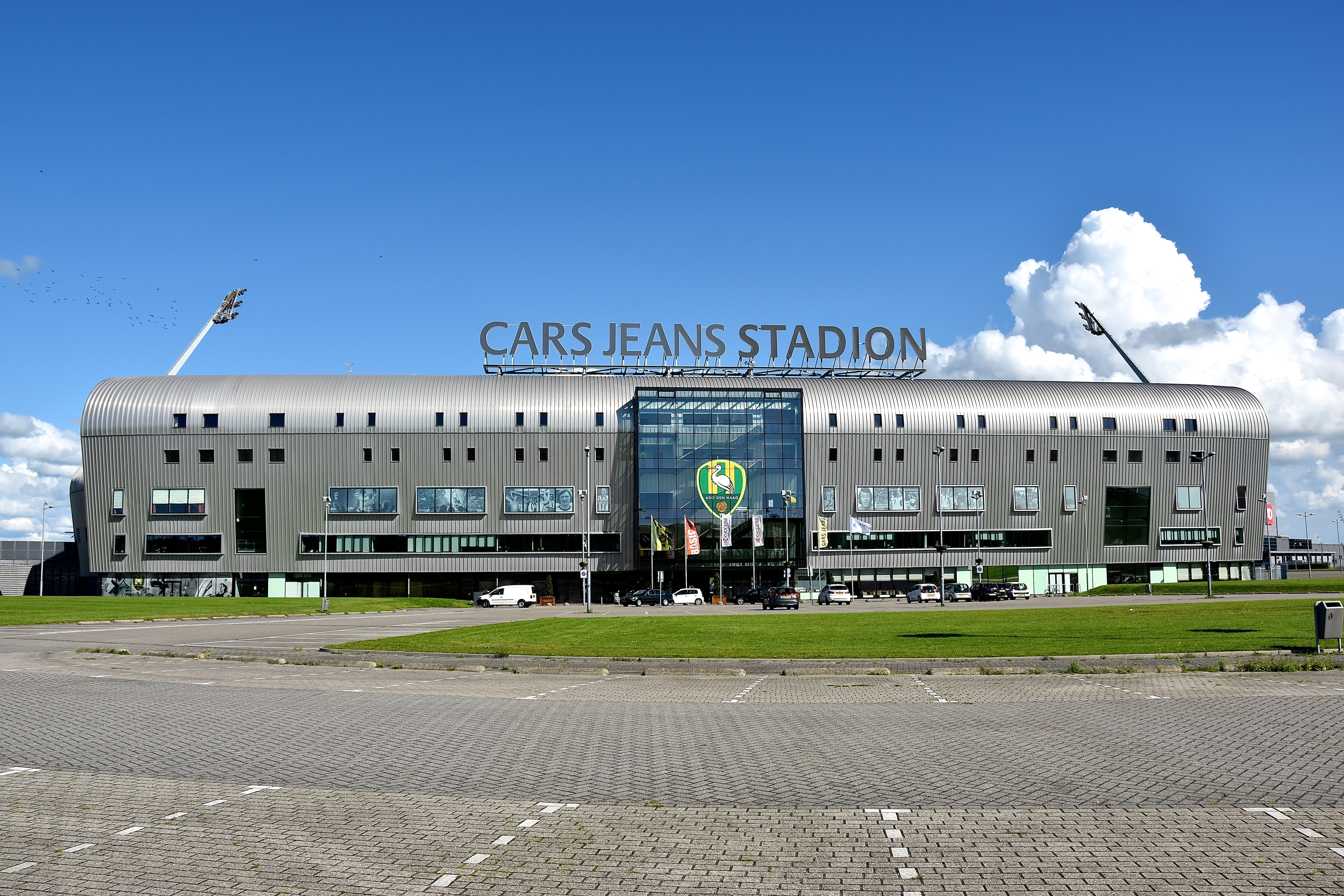
- Interactive map of WerkTalent Stadion
- Full name: Bingoal Stadion
- Former names: ADO Den Haag Stadion (2007–2010); Kyocera Stadion (2010–2017); Cars Jeans Stadion (2017–2022)
- Location: Haags Kwartier 55, 2491 BM The Hague; Netherlands
- Coordinates: 52.0628°N 4.3831°E
- Owner: ADO Den Haag
- Capacity: 15,000
- Surface: Artificial turf

Construction
- Built: 2007
- Opened: 28 July 2007
- Cost: €28 million
- Architect: Zwarts & Jansma Architects

Tenants
- ADO Den Haag (2007–present); ADO Den Haag Vrouwen; AZ Alkmaar (2019)

Website
- ADO Den Haag

The WerkTalent Stadion is a multi-use stadium in The Hague, Netherlands, designed by Zwarts & Jansma Architects. Completed in 2007, the stadium is used mostly for football and field hockey. It is the home stadium of ADO Den Haag and ADO Den Haag Vrouwen. It has a capacity of 15,000 people, and replaced ADO's former stadium Zuiderpark, which was considerably smaller. Due to UEFA's sponsorship regulations, the stadium is named ADO Den Haag Stadium for European matches.

Despite being in the third largest cities in the Netherlands, the club's attendances have been traditionally smaller than those of their rivals Ajax, Feyenoord, and PSV Eindhoven. The stadium was the venue for the 2014 Hockey World Cup.

For the last five months of 2019, it also served as the home of AZ Alkmaar, whose AFAS Stadion underwent renovations after a roof collapse.

On 18 February 2022, the roof of the Bingoal Stadion was damaged by Storm Eunice.

== Opening and naming ==
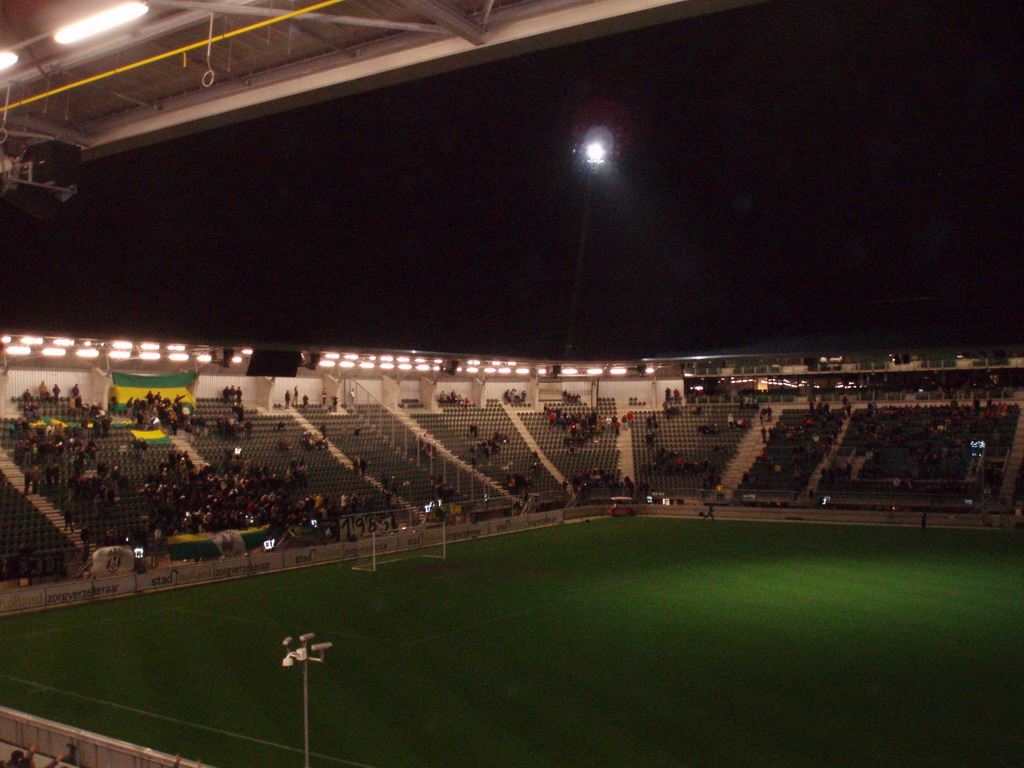
The interior of the stadium.

The stadium opened on 28 July 2007. ADO held an event celebrating the opening.

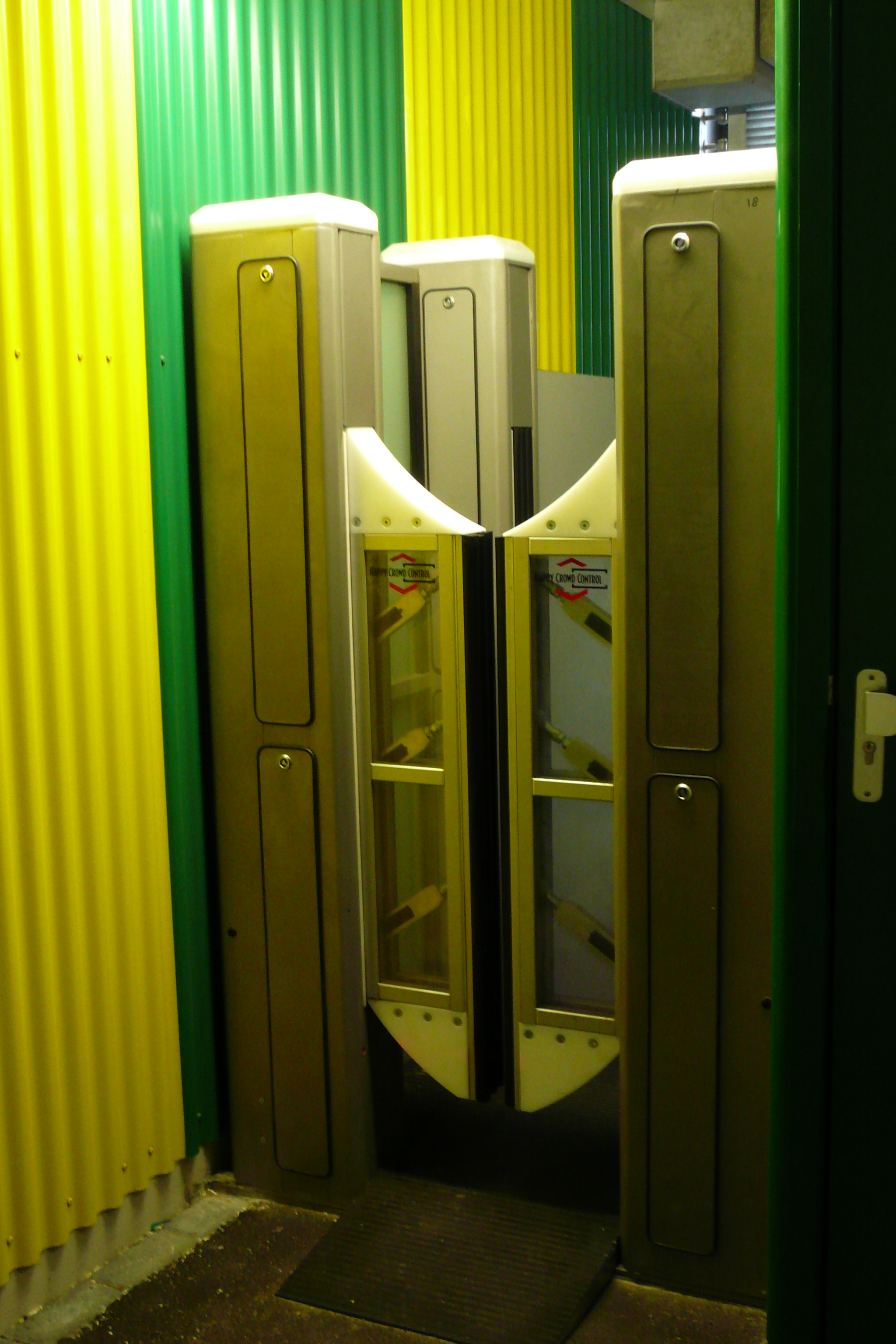
Security: Happy Crowd Control

Leaders touted the advanced security measures in the new stadium when it opened, including security cameras with facial recognition and microphones that could detect fireworks or banned chants. However, these security measures were outdated and unused by 2022.

In June 2010, ADO Den Haag signed a naming rights agreement with Japanese firm Kyocera to change the name of the stadium to Kyocera Stadion (Dutch pronunciation: [ˌkijoːˈseːraː ˌstaːdijɔn]). From 2017 to 2022, a new advertising deal led the stadium to be called Cars Jeans Stadion. Current sponsor Bingoal paid an undisclosed amount in 2022 to have the stadium renamed Bingoal Stadion.

== See also ==
- List of football stadiums in the Netherlands
- Lists of stadiums
