= Kevin Blom =

Dutch football referee

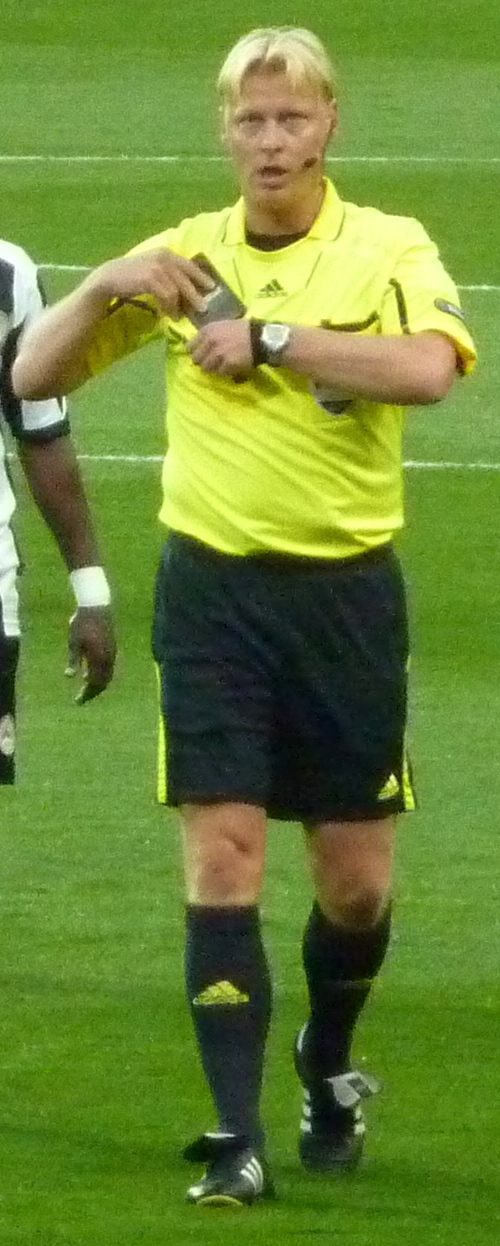
- Full name: Bernie Raymond Blom
- Born: 21 February 1974 (age 52); Gouda, Netherlands

Domestic
Years	League	Role
2003–	Eerste Divisie	Referee
2004–	Eredivisie	Referee

Bernie Raymond Blom, known as Kevin Blom (born 21 February 1974 in Gouda), is a Dutch football referee, who officiates for FIFA and UEFA. He has refereed in the Eerste Divisie, the Eredivisie and the UEFA Champions League. His home town is Alphen aan den Rijn.

His first match in professional football was the one between Go Ahead Eagles and Helmond Sport on 17 October 2003. In June 2004 he was promoted to the Dutch referees' A-list, allowing him to be a referee at international matches. As of 2020, he has retired as an international referee.

In 2005 Blom was awarded the "Sportsman of the Year" title by the municipality of Gouda. In 2007, he was awarded the Gouden Kaart ("golden card"), the Dutch prize for best referee of the year.

Blom is a full-time employee of the Royal Dutch Football Association (KNVB). In addition to his employment as a referee, he works for the Association's referee education department.

Blom refereed the UEFA Euro 2012 qualifying match between the Czech Republic and Scotland on 3 September 2011.
