= 2019–20 Sparta Rotterdam season =

Sparta Rotterdam
2019–20 season
- Chairman: Leo Ruijs
- Manager: Henk Fraser
- Stadium: Het Kasteel
- Eredivisie: 11th
- KNVB Cup: Second round
Home colours	Away colours	Third colours

The 2019–20 season was Sparta Rotterdam's 132nd season in existence and the club's first season in the top flight of Dutch football. In addition to the domestic league, Sparta Rotterdam participated in this season's edition of the KNVB Cup. The season covered the period from 1 July 2019 to 30 June 2020.

== Players ==
=== Current squad ===
As of 26 January 2020

Note: Flags indicate national team as defined under FIFA eligibility rules; some limited exceptions apply. Players may hold more than one non-FIFA nationality.

No.	Pos.	Nation	Player
—	GK	NED	Tim Coremans
—	GK	NED	Michael Fabrie
—	GK	ISR	Ariel Harush (on loan from Hapoel Be'er Sheva)
—	DF	NED	Dirk Abels
—	DF	CUW	Suently Alberto
—	DF	NED	Lassana Faye
—	DF	NED	Khalid Karami (on loan from Vitesse)
—	DF	CUW	Bradley Martis
—	DF	CPV	Lorenzo Fonseca
—	DF	NED	Bart Vriends
—	DF	POR	Mica Pinto
—	MF	NED	Adil Auassar (captain)

No.	Pos.	Nation	Player
—	MF	NED	Ugur Altintas
—	MF	NED	Ayoub Boukhari
—	MF	NED	Deroy Duarte
—	MF	CPV	Jeffry Fortes
—	MF	NED	Laros Duarte
—	MF	NED	Abdou Harroui
—	MF	BEL	Dante Rigo (on loan from PSV)
—	MF	NED	Bryan Smeets
—	FW	GER	Ragnar Ache
—	FW	CPV	Gianni dos Santos
—	FW	NED	Mohamed Rayhi
—	FW	NED	Joël Piroe (on loan from PSV)
—	FW	NED	Patrick Joosten (on loan from FC Utrecht)

=== Reserve squad ===
Note: Flags indicate national team as defined under FIFA eligibility rules; some limited exceptions apply. Players may hold more than one non-FIFA nationality.

No.	Pos.	Nation	Player
—	GK	NED	Jomar Gomes
—	GK	NED	Kenny Lipman
—	DF	NED	Tariq Dilrosun
—	DF	NED	Darwin Heuvelman
—	DF	CUW	Bradley Martis
—	DF	NED	Boyd Reith
—	DF	CPV	Lorenzo Soares Fonseca
—	DF	NED	Daan van Unen
—	DF	NED	Leon-Cardi Wong-Si-Kwie
—	MF	NED	Ayoub Bukhari
—	MF	NED	Levi Bouwense

No.	Pos.	Nation	Player
—	MF	NED	Jason Meerstadt
—	MF	NED	Sven Mijnans
—	MF	NED	Nino Roffelsen
—	MF	NED	Joshua Sanches
—	FW	NED	Emmanuel Emegha
—	FW	NED	Brad van Hoeven
—	FW	NED	Ouail El Merabet
—	FW	CPV	Gianni dos Santos
—	FW	MAR	Mohammed Tahiri
—	FW	DOM	Darlin van der Werff

== Pre-season and friendlies ==
Win Draw Loss

14 July 2019 Friendly	Sparta Rotterdam (Netherlands)	1–2	(Israel) Maccabi Tel Aviv	Mierlo, Netherlands
19:00 CEST (UTC+2)	Ache 21'		Rikan 49'; Shechter 55'	Stadium: Sportpark De Ark; Attendance: 130

17 July 2019 Friendly	Willem II (Netherlands)	0–3	(Netherlands) Sparta Rotterdam	Dongen, Netherlands
18:30 CEST (UTC+2)				Stadium: Sportpark De Biezen

20 July 2019 Friendly	Sparta Rotterdam (Netherlands)	3–0	(Netherlands) NAC Breda	Rotterdam, Netherlands
18:30 CEST (UTC+2)				Stadium: Het Kasteel

24 July 2019 Friendly	Den Bosch (Netherlands)	0–3	(Netherlands) Sparta Rotterdam	Den Bosch, Netherlands
16:30 CEST (UTC+2)				Stadium: De Vliert

10 January 2020 Friendly	Waasland-Beveren (Belgium)	2–2	(Netherlands) Sparta Rotterdam	San Pedro del Pinatar, Spain
16:30 CET (UTC+1)				Stadium: Pinatar Arena Football Center

== Competitions ==
Win Draw Loss

=== Overview ===
Competition	First match	Last match	Starting round	Final position	Record							
Competition	First match	Last match	Starting round	Final position	Pld	W	D	L	GF	GA	GD	Win %
Eredivisie	4 August 2019	8 March 2020	Matchday 1	11th	26	9	6	11	41	45	−4	34.62
KNVB Cup	30 October 2019	18 December 2019	First round	Second round	2	1	0	1	1	3	−2	50.00
Total					28	10	6	12	42	48	−6	35.71

Last updated: 8 March 2020
Source: Soccerway

=== Eredivisie ===
==== League table ====
Pos	Team	Pld	W	D	L	GF	GA	GD	Pts
9	FC Groningen	26	10	5	11	27	26	+1	35
10	Heerenveen	26	8	9	9	41	41	0	33
11	Sparta Rotterdam	26	9	6	11	41	45	−4	33
12	FC Emmen	26	9	5	12	32	45	−13	32
13	VVV-Venlo	26	8	4	14	24	51	−27	28

Source: eredivisie.nl
Rules for classification: Season in progress: 1) Most points won; 2) Less points lost; 3) Goal difference; 4) Goals scored; 5) Alphabetical order; End of season: 1) Points; 2) Goal difference; 3) Goals scored; 4) Head-to-head points; 5) Head-to-head goal difference; 6) Head-to-head away goals scored; 7) Play-off if relevant for deciding champion, relegation or participating in a European league, otherwise by draw. 8) Penalty shoot-out (only after a play-off)

==== Results summary ====
Overall								Home						Away					
Pld	W	D	L	GF	GA	GD	Pts	W	D	L	GF	GA	GD	W	D	L	GF	GA	GD
26	9	6	11	41	45	−4	33	7	3	2	30	16	+14	2	3	9	11	29	−18

Last updated: 8 March 2020.
Source: Eredivisie

==== Results by round ====
Round	1	2	3	4	5	6	7	8	9	10	11	12	13	14	15	16	17	18	19	20	21	22	23	24	25	26	27	28	29	30	31	32	33	34
Ground	A	H	A	A	H	A	H	A	H	A	H	H	A	H	A	H	A	H	A	H	A	H	H	A	H	A	H	A	H	A	H	A	H	A
Result	D	W	W	D	L	L	W	D	W	L	L	D	L	W	L	D	L	W	L	D	L	W	L	W	W	L	C	C	C	C	C	C	C	C
Position	9	5	5	6	7	11	8	7	5	8	10	11	12	11	11	11	11	11	11	11	11	11	11	11	11	11	11	11	11	11	11	11	11	11

Updated to match(es) played on 8 March 2020. Source: Eredivisie
A = Away; H = Home; W = Win; D = Draw; L = Loss

==== Matches ====
The Eredivisie schedule was announced on 14 June 2019. The 2019–20 season was abandoned on 24 April 2020, due to the coronavirus pandemic in the Netherlands.

4 August 2019 1	Feyenoord	2–2	Sparta Rotterdam	Rotterdam
14:30 CEST (UTC+2)	Berghuis 66'; Larsson 90+5'	Report	Rayhi 49'; Veldwijk 74'	Stadium: De Kuip; Attendance: 42,692; Referee: Danny Makkelie

9 August 2019 2	Sparta Rotterdam	4–1	VVV-Venlo	Rotterdam
19:45 CEST (UTC+2)				Stadium: Het Kasteel

17 August 2019 3	ADO Den Haag	1–2	Sparta Rotterdam	The Hague
19:45 CEST (UTC+2)		Report		Stadium: Cars Jeans Stadion; Attendance: 12,479; Referee: Dennis Higler

25 August 2019 4	PEC Zwolle	2–2	Sparta Rotterdam	Zwolle
19:45 CEST (UTC+2)				Stadium: MAC³PARK Stadion

1 September 2019 5	Sparta Rotterdam	1–4	Ajax	Rotterdam
14:30 CEST	Rayhi (yellow card) 52'; Smeets (yellow card) 59'; Dervişoğlu 75'	Report	Promes 25'; Ziyech 31', 60'; Tadić 58' (pen.)	Stadium: Het Kasteel; Attendance: 10,599; Referee: Jochem Kamphuis

14 September 2019 6	AZ	5–1	Sparta Rotterdam	The Hague
18:30 CEST (UTC+2)	Idrissi 4', 45'; Boadu 16', 33'; Koopmeiners 81'	Report	Harroui 2'	Stadium: Cars Jeans Stadion; Attendance: 8,000; Referee: Danny Makkelie

21 September 2019 7	Sparta Rotterdam	4–0	RKC Waalwijk	Rotterdam
19:45 CEST (UTC+2)				Stadium: Het Kasteel

28 September 2019 8	Fortuna Sittard	0–0	Sparta Rotterdam	Sittard
20:45 CEST (UTC+2)		Report		Stadium: Fortuna Sittard Stadion; Attendance: 7,483; Referee: Richard Martens

5 October 2019 9	Sparta Rotterdam	2–1	Twente	Rotterdam
19:45 CEST (UTC+2)		Report		Stadium: Het Kasteel; Attendance: 10,435; Referee: Jeroen Manschot

20 October 2019 10	Groningen	2–0	Sparta Rotterdam	Groningen
16:45 CEST (UTC+2)				Stadium: Euroborg

27 October 2019 11	Sparta Rotterdam	1–2	Utrecht	Rotterdam
14:30 CET (UTC+1)		Report		Stadium: Het Kasteel

2 November 2019 12	Sparta Rotterdam	2–2	PSV	Rotterdam
19:45 CET (UTC+1)	Ache 28'; Rayhi 58'	Report	Sadílek 56'; Gakpo 90+1'	Stadium: Het Kasteel; Attendance: 10,387; Referee: Bas Nijhuis

9 November 2019 13	SC Heerenveen	2–1	Sparta Rotterdam	Heerenveen
20:15 CET (UTC+1)				Stadium: Abe Lenstra Stadion

24 November 2019 14	Sparta Rotterdam	2–0	Vitesse	Rotterdam
19:45 CET (UTC+1)				Stadium: Het Kasteel

30 November 2019 15	Willem II	4–0	Sparta Rotterdam	Tilburg
18:30 CET (UTC+1)		Report		Stadium: Koning Willem II Stadion; Attendance: 14,250; Referee: Siemen Mulder

8 December 2019 16	Sparta Rotterdam	0–0	Heracles Almelo	Rotterdam
16:45 CET (UTC+1)				Stadium: Het Kasteel

15 December 2019 17	Emmen	2–0	Sparta Rotterdam	Emmen
20:45 CET (UTC+1)				Stadium: De Oude Meerdijk

21 December 2019 18	Sparta Rotterdam	3–0	AZ	Rotterdam
19:45 CET (UTC+1)	Auassar 18'; Smeets 29'; Dervişoğlu 57' (pen.)	Report		Stadium: Het Kasteel; Attendance: 10,031; Referee: Kevin Blom

19 January 2020 19	Ajax	2–1	Sparta Rotterdam	Amsterdam
14:30 CET (UTC+1)	Van de Beek 15'; Gravenberch 60'; Promes (yellow card) 90+3'	Report	Piroe 74'; Auassar (yellow card) 90+2'	Stadium: Johan Cruyff Arena; Attendance: 53,426; Referee: Allard Lindhout

25 January 2020 20	Sparta Rotterdam	1–1	Fortuna Sittard	Rotterdam
20:45 CET (UTC+1)	Piroe (yellow card) 63'; Mattheij 73'	Report	Damașcan 20'; Smeets (yellow card) 54'; Sambou (yellow card) 90+3'	Stadium: Het Kasteel; Attendance: 9,821; Referee: Dennis Higler

1 February 2020 21	Twente	2–0	Sparta Rotterdam	Enschede
19:45 CET (UTC+1)	Aitor (yellow card) 26'; Pleguezuelo (yellow card) 59'; Bijen 80'; Lang 90'; Menig (yellow card) 90+3'	Report	Rayhi (yellow card) 38' (yellow-red card) 87'; Piroe (yellow card) 66'; Pinto (yellow card) 81'	Stadium: De Grolsch Veste; Attendance: 26,300; Referee: Jochem Kamphuis

11 February 2020 22	Sparta Rotterdam	4–2	ADO Den Haag	Rotterdam
20:45 CET (UTC+1)		Report		Stadium: Het Kasteel; Attendance: 8,083; Referee: Danny Makkelie

16 February 2020 23	Sparta Rotterdam	1–2	Groningen	Rotterdam
19:45 CET (UTC+1)				Stadium: Het Kasteel

21 February 2020 24	RKC Waalwijk	0–1	Sparta Rotterdam	Waalwijk
20:45 CET (UTC+1)				Stadium: Mandemakers Stadion

1 March 2020 25	Sparta Rotterdam	5–1	Emmen	Rotterdam
19:45 CET (UTC+1)				Stadium: Het Kasteel

8 March 2020 26	Utrecht	5–1	Sparta Rotterdam	Utrecht
12:15 CET (UTC+1)		Report		Stadium: Stadion Galgenwaard

15 March 2020 27	Sparta Rotterdam	Cancelled	Feyenoord	Rotterdam
12:15 CET (UTC+1)				Stadium: Het Kasteel
Note: Match was initially scheduled for 15 March, but cancelled due to the COVID-19 pandemic in the Netherlands.

20 March 2020 28	Heracles Almelo	Cancelled	Sparta Rotterdam	Almelo
18:45 CET (UTC+1)				Stadium: Erve Asito
Note: Match was initially scheduled for 20 March, but cancelled due to the COVID-19 pandemic in the Netherlands.

4 April 2020 29	Sparta Rotterdam	Cancelled	SC Heerenveen	Rotterdam
19:45 CEST (UTC+2)				Stadium: Het Kasteel
Note: Match was initially scheduled for 4 April, but cancelled due to the COVID-19 pandemic in the Netherlands.

12 April 2020 30	PSV	Cancelled	Sparta Rotterdam	Eindhoven
12:15 CEST (UTC+2)				Stadium: Philips Stadion
Note: Match was initially scheduled for 12 April, but cancelled due to the COVID-19 pandemic in the Netherlands.

21 April 2020 31	Sparta Rotterdam	Cancelled	PEC Zwolle	Rotterdam
18:45 CEST (UTC+2)				Stadium: Het Kasteel
Note: Match was initially scheduled for 23 April 2020, but cancelled due to the COVID-19 pandemic in the Netherlands.

26 April 2020 32	Vitesse	Cancelled	Sparta Rotterdam	Arnhem
18:30 CEST (UTC+2)				Stadium: GelreDome
Note: Match was initially scheduled for 26 April 2020, but cancelled due to the COVID-19 pandemic in the Netherlands.

3 May 2020 33	Sparta Rotterdam	Cancelled	Willem II	Rotterdam
20:45 CEST (UTC+2)				Stadium: Het Kasteel
Note: Match was initially scheduled for 3 May, but cancelled due to the COVID-19 pandemic in the Netherlands.

10 May 2020 34	VVV-Venlo	Cancelled	Sparta Rotterdam	Venlo
16:45 CEST (UTC+2)				Stadium: De Koel
Note: Match was initially scheduled for 10 May, but cancelled due to the COVID-19 pandemic in the Netherlands.

=== KNVB Cup ===
30 October 2019 First round	Sparta Rotterdam	1–0	FC Volendam	Rotterdam
20:45 CET (UTC+1)	Veldwijk 21'	Report		Stadium: Het Kasteel; Referee: Kamphuis

18 December 2019 Second round	Willem II	3–0	Sparta Rotterdam	Tilburg
19:45 CET (UTC+1)	Pavlidis 19'; Ndayishimiye 24'; Nunnely 31'	Report		Stadium: Koning Willem II Stadion; Attendance: 10,047; Referee: Ingmar Oostrom
