= 2021–22 Sparta Rotterdam season =

Sparta Rotterdam
2021–22 season
- Chairman: Leo Ruijs
- Head coach: Henk Fraser (until 24 April); Maurice Steijn (from 26 April)
- Stadium: Het Kasteel
- Eredivisie: 14th
- KNVB Cup: Second Round
- Top goalscorer: League: Vito van Crooij (4); All: Vito van Crooij (5)
- Biggest win: Willem II 0–3 Sparta Rotterdam
- Biggest defeat: Utrecht 4–0 Sparta Rotterdam; Feyenoord 4–0 Sparta Rotterdam
Home colours	Away colours	Third colours

The 2021–22 season was the 134th season in the existence of Sparta Rotterdam and the club's third consecutive season in the top flight of Dutch football. In addition to the domestic league, Sparta Rotterdam participated in this season's edition of the KNVB Cup.

== Players ==
=== First-team squad ===
As of 1 February 2022

Note: Flags indicate national team as defined under FIFA eligibility rules; some limited exceptions apply. Players may hold more than one non-FIFA nationality.

No.	Pos.	Nation	Player
—	GK	NGR	Maduka Okoye (on loan from Watford)
—	GK	NED	Benjamin van Leer
—	GK	NED	Tim Coremans
—	DF	BEL	Michaël Heylen
—	DF	NED	Bart Vriends
—	DF	NED	Tom Beugelsdijk
—	DF	NED	Augustin Drakpe
—	DF	DEN	Riza Durmisi (on loan from Lazio)
—	DF	GRE	Giannis Masouras (on loan from Olympiacos)
—	DF	LUX	Mica Pinto
—	DF	LUX	Laurent Jans

No.	Pos.	Nation	Player
—	DF	NED	Dirk Abels
—	DF	NED	Aaron Meijers
—	MF	NED	Adil Auassar (captain)
—	MF	NED	Sven Mijnans
—	MF	NED	Joeri de Kamps (on loan from Slovan Bratislava)
—	MF	BEL	Arno Verschueren (on loan from Lommel)
—	MF	DEN	Younes Namli (on loan from Krasnodar)
—	FW	GER	Mario Engels
—	FW	NED	Vito van Crooij
—	FW	GER	Lennart Thy
—	FW	ESP	Adrián Dalmau

=== Reserve squad ===
Note: Flags indicate national team as defined under FIFA eligibility rules; some limited exceptions apply. Players may hold more than one non-FIFA nationality.

No.	Pos.	Nation	Player
—	GK	NED	Jomar Gomes
—	GK	SUR	Ishan Kort
—	GK	NED	Rijk Janse
—	GK	NED	Finn Murre
—	DF	TOG	Augustin Drakpe
—	DF	MAR	Farouq Limouri
—	DF	NED	Jeremy van Mullem
—	DF	NED	Tariq Dilrosun
—	DF	NED	Gaultiér Overman
—	DF	NED	Jay den Haan
—	DF	NED	Yanilio de Nooijer
—	DF	NED	Joshua Adney
—	MF	NED	Constantijn Schop

No.	Pos.	Nation	Player
—	MF	NED	Delano Vianello
—	MF	NED	Jason Meerstadt
—	MF	NED	Jeremy Udenhout
—	MF	MAS	Dylan van Wageningen
—	MF	NED	Patrick Brouwer
—	MF	NED	Achraf Madi
—	MF	NED	Marcus Scholten
—	FW	NED	Marouane Afaker
—	FW	NED	Mohamed el Karbachi
—	FW	NED	Mike Frimpong
—	FW	NED	Aaron Bashir
—	FW	NED	Shairon de Wind
—	FW	MAR	Mohammed Tahiri
—	FW	NED	Pepijn Doesburg

=== Players out on loan ===
Note: Flags indicate national team as defined under FIFA eligibility rules; some limited exceptions apply. Players may hold more than one non-FIFA nationality.

No. / Pos. / Nation / Player; — / MF / NED / Abdou Harroui (at Sassuolo until 30 June 2022)	No. / Pos. / Nation / Player; — / FW / NED / Reda Kharchouch (at Emmen until 30 June 2022)

== Transfers ==
=== In ===
Pos	Player	Transferred from	Fee
DF	(Luxembourg) Laurent Jans	(Belgium) Standard de Liège	Free Transfer
FW	(Netherlands) Kenzo Goudmijn	(Netherlands) AZ	Loan Transfer
FW	(Netherlands) Vito van Crooij	(Netherlands) VVV-Venlo	Undisclosed

=== Out ===
Pos	Player	Transferred from	Fee
MF	(Netherlands) Deroy Duarte	(Netherlands) Fortuna Sittard	Free Transfer
FW	(Netherlands) Danzell Gravenberch	(Netherlands) De Graafschap	Free Transfer
GK	(Netherlands) Michael Fabrie	(Netherlands) VV Smitshoek	Free Transfer
DF	(Cape Verde) Jeffry Fortes	(Netherlands) De Graafschap	Free Transfer
FW	(Netherlands) Reda Kharchouch	(Netherlands) FC Emmen	Loan Transfer
DF	(Netherlands) Lassana Faye	No club	Released
DF	(Netherlands) Aaron Meijers	(Netherlands) ADO Den Haag	End of loan
MF	(Netherlands) Wouter Burger	(Netherlands) Feyenoord	End of loan

== Pre-season and friendlies ==
Win Draw Loss

2 July 2021 Friendly	Heracles Almelo (Netherlands)	1–2	(Netherlands) Sparta Rotterdam	Almelo, Netherlands
14:00 CEST (UTC+2)				Stadium: Erve Asito

10 July 2021 Friendly	Sparta Rotterdam (Netherlands)	3–3	(Belgium) Gent	Netherlands
14:00 CEST (UTC+2)

13 July 2021 Friendly	Telstar (Netherlands)	0–0	(Netherlands) Sparta Rotterdam	Netherlands
14:00 CEST (UTC+2)

31 July 2021 Friendly	SBV Excelsior (Netherlands)	0–3	(Netherlands) Sparta Rotterdam	Netherlands
14:30 CEST (UTC+2)

7 August 2021 Friendly	Willem II (Netherlands)	Cancelled	(Netherlands) Sparta Rotterdam	Netherlands
14:00 CEST (UTC+2)

== Competitions ==
=== Overall record ===
Competition	First match	Last match	Starting round	Final position	Record							
Competition	First match	Last match	Starting round	Final position	Pld	W	D	L	GF	GA	GD	Win %
Eredivisie	15 August 2021	15 May 2021	Matchday 1	14th	34	8	11	15	30	48	−18	23.53
KNVB Cup	27 October 2021	15 December 2021	First round	Second round	2	1	0	1	3	2	+1	50.00
Total					36	9	11	16	33	50	−17	25.00

Source: Soccerway

=== Eredivisie ===
==== League table ====
Pos	Team	Pld	W	D	L	GF	GA	GD	Pts	Qualification or relegation
12	Groningen	34	9	9	16	41	55	−14	36	
13	Go Ahead Eagles	34	10	6	18	37	51	−14	36	
14	Sparta Rotterdam	34	8	11	15	30	48	−18	35	
15	Fortuna Sittard	34	10	5	19	36	67	−31	35	
16	Heracles Almelo (R)	34	9	7	18	33	49	−16	34	Qualification for the Relegation play-offs

Source: Eredivisie
Rules for classification: Season in progress: 1) Most points won; 2) Less points lost; 3) Goal difference; 4) Goals scored; 5) Alphabetical order; End of season: 1) Points; 2) Goal difference; 3) Goals scored; 4) Head-to-head points; 5) Head-to-head goal difference; 6) Head-to-head away goals scored; 7) Play-off if relevant for deciding champion, relegation or participating in a European league, otherwise by draw. 8) Penalty shoot-out (only after a play-off)
(R) Relegated

==== Results summary ====
Overall								Home						Away					
Pld	W	D	L	GF	GA	GD	Pts	W	D	L	GF	GA	GD	W	D	L	GF	GA	GD
34	8	11	15	30	48	−18	35	4	7	6	16	21	−5	4	4	9	14	27	−13

Source: Eredivisie

==== Results by round ====
Round	1	2	3	4	5	6	7	8	9	10	11	12	13	14	15	16	17	18	19	20	21	22	23	24	25	26	27	28	29	30	31	32	33	34
Ground	A	H	A	H	H	A	H	A	H	A	H	A	H	H	A	A	H	H	A	H	A	H	A	H	A	H	A	H	A	A	H	A	H	A
Result	L	D	L	W	D	D	L	L	D	L	L	W	L	L	L	D	D	D	D	L	L	W	L	L	W	W	D	D	L	L	D	W	W	W
Position	16	15	17	15	15	13	13	16	17	17	17	16	16	16	16	17	17	16	16	16	17	17	18	18	18	16	16	15	16	18	17	16	15	14

Source: Eredivisie
A = Away; H = Home; W = Win; D = Draw; L = Loss

==== Matches ====
The league fixtures were announced on 11 June 2021.

15 August 2021 1	Utrecht	4–0	Sparta Rotterdam	Utrecht
14:30 CEST (UTC+2)	Maher 2'; van der Maarel (yellow card) 51' (goal) 65'; Douvikas 74'; Gustafson 90+2' (pen.)	Report	Harroui (yellow card) 55'; van Crooij (yellow card) 59'; Vriends (yellow card) 90+2'	Stadium: Stadion Galgenwaard; Attendance: 16,000; Referee: Martin van den Kerkhof

21 August 2021 2	Sparta Rotterdam	1–1	Heracles Almelo	Rotterdam
20:00 CEST (UTC+2)	Vriends 40'; van Crooij (yellow card) 52'	Report	Vloet (yellow card) 21'; Burgzorg 77'; Fadiga (yellow card) 90'	Stadium: Het Kasteel; Attendance: 7,000; Referee: Bas Nijhuis

28 August 2021 3	Go Ahead Eagles	2–0	Sparta Rotterdam	Deventer
20:00 CEST (UTC+2)	Bakker 6' (pen.); Botos 60'	Report	Pinto (red card) 53'	Stadium: De Adelaarshorst; Referee: Jannick van der Laan

3 October 2021 8	PSV	2–1	Sparta Rotterdam	Eindhoven
16:45 CEST (UTC+2)	Sangaré (yellow card) 45+2', (goal) 82'; Thomas 86'	Report	Abels (yellow card) 65'; Okoye (yellow card) 79'; Thy 90'	Stadium: Philips Stadion; Attendance: 30,500; Referee: Sander van der Eijk

20 November 2021 13	Sparta Rotterdam	0–1	Twente	Rotterdam
18:45 CET (UTC+1)	Masouras (yellow card) 82'	Report	van Wolfswinkel 83' (pen.); Vlap (yellow card) 89'	Stadium: Sparta Stadion; Attendance: 0 Referee: Edwin van de Graaf

28 November 2021 14	Sparta Rotterdam	0–1	Ajax	Rotterdam
12:15 CET (UTC+1)	Smeets (yellow card) 90+5'; Engels (yellow card) 90+5'	Report	Tadić 36'; Neres (yellow card) 90+4'	Stadium: Sparta Stadion Het Kasteel; Attendance: 0 Referee: Jochem Kamphuis

5 December 2021 15	AZ	3–1	Sparta Rotterdam	Alkmaar
14:30 CET (UTC+1)	Karlsson 27'; Pavlidis 31', 58'	Report	Auassar	Stadium: AFAS Stadion; Attendance: 0 Referee: Sander van der Eijk

18 December 2021 17	Sparta Rotterdam	2–2	Vitesse	Rotterdam
18:45 CET (UTC+1)		Report		Stadium: Het Kasteel; Attendance: 0 Referee: Bas Nijhuis

23 January 2022 20	Sparta Rotterdam	0–3	Utrecht	Rotterdam
16:45 CET (UTC+1)	Dalmau (yellow card) 28'	Report	Douvikas 12'; Timber (yellow card) 41'; Mahi 47'; Coremans 75' (o.g.)	Stadium: Het Kasteel; Attendance: 0 Referee: Erwin Blank

27 February 2022 24	Sparta Rotterdam	1–2	PSV	Rotterdam
14:30 CET (UTC+1)	Thy 32'; De Kamps (yellow card) 39'; Verschueren (red card) 54'; Van Crooij (yellow card) 62'; Engels (yellow card) 63'; Beugelsdijk (yellow card) 90+4'; Meijers (yellow card) 90+5'	Report	Max (yellow card) 20'; Sangaré (yellow card) 38'; Teze (yellow card) 38'; Mauro Júnior 59'; Dōan 67'	Stadium: Sparta Stadion; Attendance: 10,020; Referee: Jeroen Manschot

12 March 2022 26	Sparta Rotterdam	1–0	Go Ahead Eagles	Rotterdam
16:30 CET (UTC+1)				Stadium: Het Kasteel

3 April 2022 28	Sparta Rotterdam	1–1	Heerenveen	Rotterdam
14:30 CEST (UTC+2)				Stadium: Het Kasteel

9 April 2022 29	Ajax	2−1	Sparta Rotterdam	Amsterdam
20:00 CEST (UTC+2)	Klaassen 49'; Tadić 62' (pen.)	Report	De Kamps 33', (yellow card) 50'; Auassar (yellow card) 61'; Engels (yellow card) 64'	Stadium: Johan Cruyff Arena (roof open); Attendance: 54,254; Referee: Pol van Boekel

16 April 2022 23	Fortuna Sittard	3–0	Sparta Rotterdam	Sittard
18:45 CEST (UTC+2)				Stadium: Fortuna Sittard Stadion

19 April 2022 25	Vitesse	0–1	Sparta Rotterdam	Arnhem
20:00 CEST (UTC+2)		Report	Dalmau 5'	Stadium: GelreDome

22 April 2022 30	Twente	2–0	Sparta Rotterdam	Enschede
20:00 CEST (UTC+2)				Stadium: De Grolsch Veste

30 April 2022 31	Sparta Rotterdam	1–1	AZ	Rotterdam
21:00 CEST (UTC+2)	Van Crooij 90+3'	Report	Pavlidis 48'	Stadium: Het Kasteel; Attendance: 10,010; Referee: Edwin van de Graaf

7 May 2022 32	Groningen	1–2	Sparta Rotterdam	Groningen
21:00 CEST (UTC+2)				Stadium: Euroborg

11 May 2022 33	Sparta Rotterdam	2–0	PEC Zwolle	Rotterdam
20:00 CEST (UTC+2)				Stadium: Het Kasteel

15 May 2022 34	Heracles Almelo	1–3	Sparta Rotterdam	Almelo
14:30 CEST (UTC+2)				Stadium: Erve Asito

=== KNVB Cup ===
27 October 2021 First round	GVVV	0–2	Sparta Rotterdam	Veenendaal
20:00 CEST				Stadium: Sportpark Panhuis

15 December 2021 Second round	Vitesse	2–1	Sparta Rotterdam	Arnhem
18:00 CET(UTC+1)	Baden Frederiksen 42', 80'		Van Crooij 33' (pen.)	Stadium: GelreDome
