= Sven Mijnans =

Dutch footballer

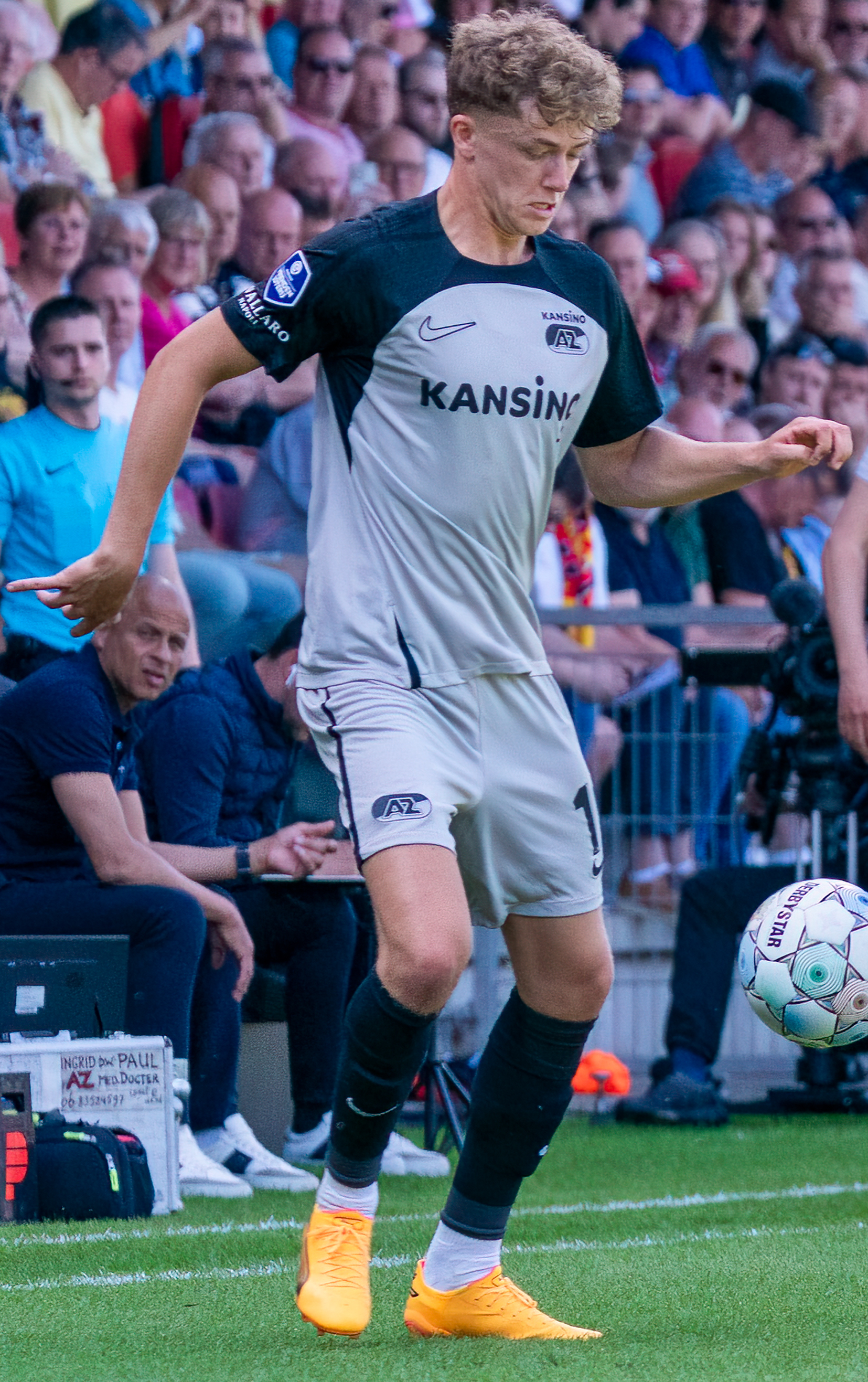
- Mijnans with AZ in 2024

Personal information
- Date of birth: 9 March 2000 (age 26)
- Place of birth: Spijkenisse, Netherlands
- Height: 1.93 m (6 ft 4 in)
- Position: Attacking midfielder

Team information
- Current team: PSV
- Number: 21

Youth career
- –2015: VV Spijkenisse
- 2015–2016: ADO Den Haag
- 2016–2018: VV Spijkenisse
- 2018: Sparta Rotterdam

Senior career*
Years	Team	Apps	(Gls)
2018	VV Spijkenisse	10	(0)
2018–2020	Jong Sparta	44	(8)
2020–2023	Sparta	80	(8)
2023–2026	AZ	105	(26)
2026–	PSV Eindhoven	10	(9)

International career
2022–2023	Netherlands U21	4	(0)
- * Club domestic league appearances and goals as of 31 October 2026

Sven Mijnans (born 9 March 2000) is a Dutch professional footballer who plays as an attacking midfielder for Eredivisie club PSV.

== Club career ==
Mijnans played in the academy of VV Spijkenisse. After experiences at Sparta Rotterdam and Feyenoord, he joined the academy of ADO Den Haag aged 16. However, he returned to VV Spijkenisse a year later. He made his Derde Divisie debut in February 2018.

=== Sparta Rotterdam ===
Mijnans joined Sparta Rotterdam in May 2018. At the start of the season, he had training sessions with the second team, but played most of his matches at under 19 level. He made his Tweede Divisie debut for the second team in November 2018. During the second half of the season, he was a regular starter for the second team. He was included in the match squad for the first team seven times at the end of his first season at Sparta Rotterdam as the club won promotion to the Eredivisie through the play-offs. Mijnans was included in the match squad for an Eredivisie game for a first time on 14 September 2019 against AZ.

==== First team ====
In September 2020, he extended his contract at Sparta Rotterdam until June 2022, with an option for another season. Five days later, he made his official debut for Sparta Rotterdam, replacing Adil Auassar for the final minutes of the match that resulted in a 2–0 defeat to Vitesse at the GelreDome. On 4 October 2020, Sparta Rotterdam was 4–0 down against AZ when Mijnans replaced Bryan Smeets at half time. At the end of the match, Mijnans scored his first professional goal to equalise. On 28 October 2020, Henk Fraser gave Mijnans his first professional start, in the KNVB Cup match against ADO Den Haag, which resulted in a defeat after a penalty shoot-out. Mijnans extended his contract at Sparta Rotterdam until the summer of 2024 in August 2021. On 18 December 2021, Mijnans scored both of Sparta Rotterdam's goals in a 2–2 draw against Vitesse. Sparta Rotterdam finished the Eredivisie season with a point ahead of the relegation zone.

=== AZ ===
On 31 January 2023, Mijnans signed a contract until 2028 for AZ Alkmaar, who reportedly paid a €2.5 million transfer fee to Sparta Rotterdam.

=== PSV ===
On 6 July 2026, Mijnans joined PSV Eindhoven on a 5-year deal for €13 million.

== International career ==
In October 2021, Mijnans was included in the provisional squad for the Netherlands under-21 team for a first time by Erwin van de Looi. In May 2022, he was included in the final squad of the under-21 team for a first time. He made his debut for the team on 7 June 2022, starting in the Euro qualifier against Gibraltar (6–0).

== Career statistics ==
As of match played 31 October 2026

Appearances and goals by club, season and competition
Club	Season	League			KNVB Cup		Europe		Other		Total	
Club	Season	Division	Apps	Goals	Apps	Goals	Apps	Goals	Apps	Goals	Apps	Goals
Jong Sparta	2018–19	Tweede Divisie	18	2	—		—		—		18	2
Jong Sparta	2019–20	Tweede Divisie	24	3	—		—		—		24	3
Jong Sparta	2020–21	Tweede Divisie	3	3	—		—		—		3	3
Jong Sparta	Total		45	8	—		—		—		45	8
Sparta Rotterdam	2020–21	Eredivisie	31	2	1	0	—		1	0	33	2
Sparta Rotterdam	2021–22	Eredivisie	30	3	2	0	—		—		32	3
Sparta Rotterdam	2022–23	Eredivisie	19	3	2	0	—		—		21	3
Sparta Rotterdam	Total		80	8	5	0	0	0	1	0	86	8
AZ Alkmaar	2022–23	Eredivisie	15	2	1	0	6 (Note: Appearances in UEFA Conference League)	0	—		22	2
AZ Alkmaar	2023–24	Eredivisie	30	4	1	0	8	0	—		39	4
AZ Alkmaar	2024–25	Eredivisie	30	9	4	1	10 (Note: Appearances in UEFA Europa League)	4	—		44	14
AZ Alkmaar	2025–26	Eredivisie	30	11	4	3	16	7	—		50	21
AZ Alkmaar	Total		105	26	10	4	40	11	—		155	40
PSV	2026–27	Eredivisie	10	9	0	0	3 (Note: Appearances in UEFA Champions League)	0	1 (Note: Appearance in Johan Cruyff Shield)	0	14	9
Career total			239	48	15	4	43	11	2	0	300	63

== Honours ==
AZ

- KNVB Cup: 2025–26

Individual

- Eredivisie Team of the Month: May 2025
