= 2020–21 Sparta Rotterdam season =

Sparta Rotterdam
2020–21 season
- Chairman: Leo Ruijs
- Manager: Henk Fraser
- Stadium: Het Kasteel
- Eredivisie: 8th
- KNVB Cup: First round
| Home colours | Away colours | Third colours |

The 2020–21 season was Sparta Rotterdam's 133rd season in existence and the club's second consecutive season in the top flight of Dutch football. In addition to the domestic league, Sparta Rotterdam participated in this season's edition of the KNVB Cup. The season covered the period from 1 July 2020 to 30 June 2021.

== Players ==
=== First-team squad ===
Note: Flags indicate national team as defined under FIFA eligibility rules; some limited exceptions apply. Players may hold more than one non-FIFA nationality.

| No. | Pos. | Nation | Player |
|---|---|---|---|
| — | GK | NED | Benjamin van Leer |
| — | GK | NED | Tim Coremans |
| — | GK | NGR | Maduka Okoye |
| — | GK | NED | Michael Fabrie |
| — | DF | NED | Tom Beugelsdijk |
| — | DF | NED | Bart Vriends |
| — | DF | BEL | Michaël Heylen |
| — | DF | NED | Augustin Drakpe |
| — | DF | NED | Aaron Meijers (on loan from ADO Den Haag) |
| — | DF | LUX | Mica Pinto |
| — | DF | CPV | Jeffry Fortes |
| — | DF | NED | Dirk Abels |

| No. | Pos. | Nation | Player |
|---|---|---|---|
| — | MF | NED | Adil Auassar (captain) |
| — | MF | NED | Abdou Harroui |
| — | MF | NED | Deroy Duarte |
| — | MF | NED | Wouter Burger (on loan from Feyenoord) |
| — | MF | NED | Laros Duarte |
| — | MF | NED | Sven Mijnans |
| — | MF | NED | Bryan Smeets |
| — | FW | GER | Lennart Thy |
| — | FW | GER | Mario Engels |
| — | FW | NED | Reda Kharchouch |
| — | FW | NED | Danzell Gravenberch |
| — | FW | NED | Emanuel Emegha |

=== Reserve squad ===
Note: Flags indicate national team as defined under FIFA eligibility rules; some limited exceptions apply. Players may hold more than one non-FIFA nationality.

| No. | Pos. | Nation | Player |
|---|---|---|---|
| — | GK | NED | Jomar Gomes |
| — | GK | NED | Kenny Lipman |
| — | DF | NED | Tariq Dilrosun |
| — | DF | NED | Darwin Heuvelman |
| — | DF | NED | Boyd Reith |
| — | DF | NED | Daan van Unen |
| — | DF | NED | Leon-Cardi Wong-Si-Kwie |
| — | MF | NED | Ayoub Bukhari |

| No. | Pos. | Nation | Player |
|---|---|---|---|
| — | MF | NED | Levi Bouwense |
| — | MF | NED | Jason Meerstadt |
| — | MF | NED | Sven Mijnans |
| — | MF | NED | Nino Roffelsen |
| — | FW | NED | Brad van Hoeven |
| — | FW | NED | Ouail El Merabet |
| — | FW | CPV | Gianni dos Santos |
| — | FW | MAR | Mohammed Tahiri |

=== Players out on loan ===
Note: Flags indicate national team as defined under FIFA eligibility rules; some limited exceptions apply. Players may hold more than one non-FIFA nationality.

| No. | Pos. | Nation | Player |
|---|---|---|---|
| — | DF | NED | Lassana Faye (on loan to ADO Den Haag) |

== Pre-season and friendlies ==
Win Draw Loss

| 9 August 2020 Friendly | Feyenoord (Netherlands) | 3–0 | (Netherlands) Sparta Rotterdam | Rotterdam, Netherlands |
| 14:30 CEST (UTC+2) | Boženík 13', 15'; Summerville 22' | Report | | Stadium: De Kuip; Attendance: 3,000 |

| 15 August 2020 Friendly | Lens (France) | Cancelled | (Netherlands) Sparta Rotterdam | Lens, France |
| 19:00 CEST (UTC+2) | | | | Stadium: Stade Bollaert-Delelis |

| 18 August 2020 Friendly | Telstar (Netherlands) | 0–0 | (Netherlands) Sparta Rotterdam | Velsen-Zuid, Netherlands |
| 13:00 CEST (UTC+2) | | Report | | Stadium: Rabobank IJmond Stadion |

| 22 August 2020 Friendly | Sparta Rotterdam (Netherlands) | 1–1 | (Netherlands) NAC Breda | Rotterdam, Netherlands |
| 13:00 CEST (UTC+2) | Gravenberch 4' | Report | Schouten 82' | Stadium: Het Kasteel |

| 27 August 2020 Friendly | RKC Waalwijk (Netherlands) | 1–1 | (Netherlands) Sparta Rotterdam | Waalwijk, Netherlands |
| 20:00 CEST (UTC+2) | Tahiri 63' | Report | Vriends 53' | Stadium: Mandemakers Stadion |

| 4 September 2020 Friendly | Sparta Rotterdam (Netherlands) | 1–1 | (Netherlands) ADO Den Haag | Rotterdam, Netherlands |
| 14:00 CEST (UTC+2) | Fortes 88' | Report | Kramer 74' (pen.) | Stadium: Het Kasteel; Attendance: 0 |

| 7 September 2020 Friendly | Borussia Dortmund (Germany) | 2–1 | (Netherlands) Sparta Rotterdam | Dortmund, Germany |
| 17:00 CEST (UTC+2) | Reus 63'; Pherai 66' | Report | Emegha 81' | Stadium: BVB-Fußballpark Hohenbuschei; Attendance: 0 |

== Competitions ==
=== Overview ===
| Competition | First match | Last match | Starting round | Final position | Record | | | | | | | |
| Competition | First match | Last match | Starting round | Final position | Pld | W | D | L | GF | GA | GD | Win % |
|---|---|---|---|---|---|---|---|---|---|---|---|---|
| Eredivisie | 13 September 2020 | 16 May 2021 | Matchday 1 | 8th | 34 | 13 | 8 | 13 | 49 | 48 | +1 | 38.24 |
| Eredivisie Play-offs | 19 May 2021 | | Semi-finals | Semi-finals | 1 | 0 | 0 | 1 | 0 | 2 | −2 | 0.00 |
| KNVB Cup | 28 October 2020 | | First round | First round | 1 | 0 | 1 | 0 | 1 | 1 | +0 | 0.00 |
| Total | | | | | 36 | 13 | 9 | 14 | 50 | 51 | −1 | 36.11 |

Source: Soccerway

=== Eredivisie ===
==== League table ====
| Pos | Team | Pld | W | D | L | GF | GA | GD | Pts | Qualification or relegation |
|---|---|---|---|---|---|---|---|---|---|---|
| 6 | Utrecht | 34 | 13 | 14 | 7 | 52 | 41 | +11 | 53 | Qualification for the European competition play-offs (Note: Winner of play-off will qualify to Europa Conference League second qualifying round.) |
| 7 | Groningen | 34 | 14 | 8 | 12 | 40 | 37 | +3 | 50 | Qualification for the European competition play-offs |
| 8 | Sparta Rotterdam | 34 | 13 | 8 | 13 | 49 | 48 | +1 | 47 | Qualification for the European competition play-offs |
| 9 | Heracles Almelo | 34 | 12 | 8 | 14 | 42 | 53 | −11 | 44 | |
| 10 | Twente | 34 | 10 | 11 | 13 | 48 | 50 | −2 | 41 | |

Source: Eredivisie, Soccerway
Rules for classification: Season in progress: 1) Most points won; 2) Less points lost; 3) Goal difference; 4) Goals scored; 5) Alphabetical order; End of season: 1) Points; 2) Goal difference; 3) Goals scored; 4) Head-to-head points; 5) Head-to-head goal difference; 6) Head-to-head away goals scored; 7) Play-off if relevant for deciding champion, relegation or participating in a European league, otherwise by draw. 8) Penalty shoot-out (only after a play-off)

==== Results summary ====
| Overall | | | | | | | | Home | | | | | | Away | | | | | |
| Pld | W | D | L | GF | GA | GD | Pts | W | D | L | GF | GA | GD | W | D | L | GF | GA | GD |
|---|---|---|---|---|---|---|---|---|---|---|---|---|---|---|---|---|---|---|---|
| 34 | 13 | 8 | 13 | 49 | 48 | +1 | 47 | 6 | 4 | 7 | 30 | 27 | +3 | 7 | 4 | 6 | 19 | 21 | −2 |

Source: Eredivisie

==== Results by round ====
| Round | 1 | 2 | 3 | 4 | 5 | 6 | 7 | 8 | 9 | 10 | 11 | 12 | 13 | 14 | 15 | 16 | 17 | 18 | 19 | 20 | 21 | 22 | 23 | 24 | 25 | 26 | 27 | 28 | 29 | 30 | 31 | 32 | 33 | 34 |
|---|---|---|---|---|---|---|---|---|---|---|---|---|---|---|---|---|---|---|---|---|---|---|---|---|---|---|---|---|---|---|---|---|---|---|
| Ground | H | A | A | H | A | H | H | A | H | A | H | A | H | A | H | A | H | A | H | A | A | H | A | H | A | H | A | H | A | H | A | H | H | A |
| Result | L | L | L | D | D | D | L | W | W | L | W | W | L | W | L | W | L | L | D | D | W | L | L | L | D | W | D | W | L | W | W | W | D | W |
| Position | 12 | 16 | 18 | 18 | 18 | 17 | 17 | 13 | 10 | 10 | 10 | 9 | 9 | 9 | 9 | 8 | 9 | 10 | 10 | 12 | 12 | 12 | 12 | 13 | 12 | 12 | 12 | 11 | 11 | 11 | 9 | 8 | 8 | 8 |

Source: Eredivisie
A = Away; H = Home; W = Win; D = Draw; L = Loss

==== Matches ====
The league fixtures were announced on 24 July 2020.

| 13 September 2020 1 | Sparta Rotterdam | 0–1 | Ajax | Rotterdam |
| 14:30 CEST (UTC+2) | Heylen (yellow card) 54'; Pinto (yellow card) 57' | Report | Gravenberch (yellow card) 17'; Tagliafico (red card) 27'; Blind (yellow card) 28'; Antony 37'; Onana (yellow card) 86' | Stadium: Het Kasteel; Attendance: 3,934; Referee: Jochem Kamphuis |

| 19 September 2020 2 | Vitesse | 2–0 | Sparta Rotterdam | Arnhem |
| 18:45 CEST (UTC+2) | Tannane 27'; Darfalou (yellow card) 44'; Hájek (yellow card) 53'; Broja 82' | Report | Harroui (yellow card) 6'; Heylen (yellow card) 20' (yellow-red card) 42'; Pinto (yellow card) 54' | Stadium: GelreDome; Attendance: 4,914; Referee: Björn Kuipers |

| 26 September 2020 3 | PEC Zwolle | 4–0 | Sparta Rotterdam | Zwolle |
| 16:30 CEST (UTC+2) | Nakayama (yellow card) 33', (goal) 71'; Ghoochannejhad 45+5' (pen.), 47'; Leemans 54' | Report | Auassar (yellow card) 45+2'; Pinto (red card) 45+4' | Stadium: MAC³PARK Stadion; Attendance: 2,933; Referee: Allard Lindhout |

| 4 October 2020 4 | Sparta Rotterdam | 4–4 | AZ | Rotterdam |
| 14:30 CEST (UTC+2) | Harroui 57'; Abels 64'; Thy 88' (pen.); Mijnans 90', (yellow card) 90+5' | Report | Aboukhlal 9', 19', (yellow card) 67'; De Wit 14', 33'; Bizot (yellow card) 55' (yellow-red card) 85'; Boadu (yellow card) 56' | Stadium: Het Kasteel; Attendance: 0 Referee: Danny Makkelie |

| 18 October 2020 5 | Feyenoord | 1–1 | Sparta Rotterdam | Rotterdam |
| 12:15 CEST (UTC+2) | Haps 44' | Report | Thy 52' | Stadium: De Kuip; Attendance: 0 Referee: Kevin Blom |

| 25 October 2020 6 | Sparta Rotterdam | 1–1 | Heracles Almelo | Rotterdam |
| 14:30 CET (UTC+1) | Harroui 47' | Report | Vloet 75' | Stadium: Het Kasteel; Attendance: 0 Referee: Serdar Gözübüyük |

| 1 November 2020 7 | Sparta Rotterdam | 1–4 | SC Heerenveen | Rotterdam |
| 14:30 CET (UTC+1) | L. Duarte (yellow card) 50'; Thy 90+3' (pen.) | Report | Nygren 7'; Van Hecke 25'; H. Veerman 42', 57' | Stadium: Het Kasteel; Attendance: 0 Referee: Bas Nijhuis |

| 7 November 2020 8 | RKC Waalwijk | 0–2 | Sparta Rotterdam | Waalwijk |
| 21:00 CET (UTC+1) | | Report | Thy 59'; Harroui 90+2' | Stadium: Mandemakers Stadion; Attendance: 0 Referee: Ingmar Oostrom |

| 22 November 2020 9 | Sparta Rotterdam | 6–0 | ADO Den Haag | Rotterdam |
| 14:30 CET (UTC+1) | Smeets (yellow card) 24'; Thy 43', 59'; Mijnans 53'; Harroui 56'; Engels 80', 85' | Report | Pinas (yellow card) 24'; Pascu (yellow card) 79' | Stadium: Het Kasteel; Attendance: 0 Referee: Kevin Blom |

| 29 November 2020 10 | PSV | 1–0 | Sparta Rotterdam | Eindhoven |
| 20:00 CET (UTC+1) | Ledezma (yellow card) 30'; Malen 78' | Report | Mijnans (yellow card) 66'; Engels (yellow card) 81'; Meijers (yellow card) 83' | Stadium: Philips Stadion; Attendance: 0 Referee: Jeroen Manschot |

| 4 December 2020 11 | Sparta Rotterdam | 2–1 | FC Emmen | Rotterdam |
| 20:00 CET (UTC+1) | Duarte 22'; Harroui 58'; Gravenberch (yellow card) 80' | Report | Peña (yellow card) 5'; Jansen (yellow card) 6'; Araujo 52'; Ben Moussa (yellow card) 79' | Stadium: Het Kasteel; Attendance: 0 Referee: Jochem Kamphuis |

| 13 December 2020 12 | Willem II | 1–3 | Sparta Rotterdam | Tilburg |
| 14:30 CET (UTC+1) | Sağlam (yellow card) 12'; Köhn (yellow card) 19'; Holmén (yellow card) 52'; Wriedt 90+3' | Report | Thy 6'; D. Duarte 45+1', 51'; Vriends (yellow card) 59' | Stadium: Koning Willem II Stadion; Attendance: 0 Referee: Christiaan Bax |

| 19 December 2020 13 | Sparta Rotterdam | 2–3 | FC Groningen | Rotterdam |
| 16:30 CET (UTC+1) | Thy 36'; Pinto (yellow card) 71'; Burger 79' | Report | Dammers 16'; Larsen 53', 73' | Stadium: Het Kasteel; Attendance: 0 Referee: Danny Makkelie |

| 22 December 2020 14 | FC Twente | 0–2 | Sparta Rotterdam | Enschede |
| 21:00 CET (UTC+1) | Pierie (yellow card) 82' | Report | Engels 45+1'; Duarte 63' | Stadium: De Grolsch Veste; Attendance: 0 Referee: Martin Van Den Kerkhof |

| 10 January 2021 15 | Sparta Rotterdam | 0–2 | Feyenoord | Rotterdam |
| 12:15 | | Report | Geertruida 27'; Jørgensen 90+4' | Stadium: Het Kasteel; Attendance: 0 Referee: Dennis Higler |

| 13 January 2021 16 | Fortuna Sittard | 0–1 | Sparta Rotterdam | Sittard |
| 20:00 CET (UTC+1) | | Report | Thy 57' | Stadium: Fortuna Sittard Stadion; Attendance: 0 Referee: Allard Lindhout |

| 16 January 2021 17 | Sparta Rotterdam | 3–5 | PSV | Rotterdam |
| 18:45 CET (UTC+1) | Smeets 4'; Beugelsdijk (yellow card) 45+2'; Gravenberch 75'; Kharchouch 87' (pen.) | Report | Mauro Júnior 24'; Malen 47', 90+3'; Madueke 49'; Max 71' | Stadium: Het Kasteel; Attendance: 0 Referee: Bas Nijhuis |

| 24 January 2021 18 | FC Utrecht | 1–0 | Sparta Rotterdam | Utrecht |
| 14:30 CET (UTC+1) | Maher (yellow card) 56'; Boussaid 88' | Report | Auassar (yellow card) 76' | Stadium: Stadion Galgenwaard; Attendance: 0 Referee: Serdar Gözübüyük |

| 28 January 2021 19 | Sparta Rotterdam | 0–0 | FC Twente | Rotterdam |
| 18:45 CET (UTC+1) | Abels (yellow card) 90+3' | Report | | Stadium: Het Kasteel; Attendance: 0 Referee: Edwin van de Graaf |

| 31 January 2021 20 | ADO Den Haag | 1–1 | Sparta Rotterdam | The Hague |
| 16:45 CET (UTC+1) | Gomelt 45'; Del Fabro (yellow card) 73'; Castillo (yellow card) 77'; Pinas (yellow card) 78'; Besuijen (yellow card) 90+4' | Report | Heylen (yellow card) 36'; Kharchouch 68' | Stadium: Cars Jeans Stadion; Attendance: 0 Referee: Erwin Blank |

| 13 February 2021 22 | Sparta Rotterdam | 1–2 | Fortuna Sittard | Rotterdam |
| 14:15 CET (UTC+1) | Gravenberch (yellow card) 2', (goal) 31'; Beugelsdijk (yellow card) 80' | Report | Semedo 23', (yellow card) 90'; Polter 50'; Flemming (yellow card) 88' | Stadium: Het Kasteel; Attendance: 0 Referee: Martin van den Kerkhof |

| 21 February 2021 23 | Ajax | 4–2 | Sparta Rotterdam | Amsterdam |
| 20:00 CET (UTC+1) | Haller 14', 37'; Schuurs 45+5'; Kudus 50' | Report | Gravenberch 53', 90+1'; Heylen (yellow card) 55' | Stadium: Johan Cruyff Arena; Attendance: 0 Referee: Jeroen Manschot |

| 28 February 2021 24 | Sparta Rotterdam | 0–2 | Willem II | Rotterdam |
| 12:15 CET (UTC+1) | Duarte (yellow card) 43'; Fortes (red card) 78' | Report | Nunnely 67'; Ndayishimiye 78' (pen.) | Stadium: Het Kasteel; Attendance: 0 Referee: Kevin Blom |

| 5 March 2021 25 | FC Emmen | 1–1 | Sparta Rotterdam | Emmen |
| 20:00 CET (UTC+1) | Verrips (yellow card) 78'; Laursen (yellow card) 90+4'; De Leeuw 90+6' (pen.) | Report | Duarte 43'; Kharchouch (yellow card) 90+3' | Stadium: De Oude Meerdijk; Attendance: 0 Referee: Danny Makkelie |

| 9 March 2021 21 | VVV-Venlo | 0–1 | Sparta Rotterdam | Venlo |
| 18:45 CET (UTC+1) | | Report | Duarte (yellow card) 65'; Da Graca 70' (o.g.) | Stadium: De Koel; Attendance: 0 Referee: Christiaan Bax |

| 13 March 2021 26 | Sparta Rotterdam | 2–0 | RKC Waalwijk | Rotterdam |
| 21:00 CET (UTC+1) | Beugelsdijk 57'; Smeets 90+3' | Report | | Stadium: Het Kasteel; Attendance: 0 Referee: Rob Dieperink |

| 21 March 2021 27 | Heracles Almelo | 1–1 | Sparta Rotterdam | Almelo |
| 16:45 CET (UTC+1) | Bakış (yellow card) 58'; Vloet 90+3' | Report | Thy 58'; Duarte (yellow card) 84' | Stadium: Erve Asito; Attendance: 0 Referee: Siemen Mulder |

| 3 April 2021 28 | Sparta Rotterdam | 3–2 | PEC Zwolle | Rotterdam |
| 21:00 CEST (UTC+2) | Pinto 7'; Beugelsdijk (yellow card) 26'; Thy 75' (pen.), 90+3' | Report | Van Polen 52'; Reijnders (yellow card) 57'; Tedić 63' | Stadium: Het Kasteel; Attendance: 0 Referee: Edwin van de Graaf |

| 10 April 2021 29 | AZ | 2–0 | Sparta Rotterdam | Alkmaar |
| 20:00 CEST (UTC+2) | Clasie 13'; De Wit 66' | Report | Pinto (yellow card) 71' | Stadium: AFAS Stadion; Attendance: 0 Referee: Björn Kuipers |

| 24 April 2021 30 | Sparta Rotterdam | 2–0 | VVV-Venlo | Rotterdam |
| 18:45 CEST (UTC+2) | Duarte 41'; Smeets (yellow card) 45', (goal) 67'; Beugelsdijk (yellow card) 76' | Report | Post (yellow card) 56'; Van Crooij (yellow card) 70'; Donis (yellow card) 77'; Machach (yellow card) 90' | Stadium: Het Kasteel; Attendance: 0 Referee: Sander van der Eijk |

| 2 May 2021 31 | FC Groningen | 1–2 | Sparta Rotterdam | Groningen |
| 14:30 CEST (UTC+2) | El Hankouri (yellow card) 58'; Lundqvist 87' | Report | Harroui 27'; Meijers (yellow card) 37'; Beugelsdijk 56' | Stadium: Euroborg; Attendance: 0 Referee: Danny Makkelie |

| 7 May 2021 32 | Sparta Rotterdam | 3–0 | Vitesse | Rotterdam |
| 20:00 CEST (UTC+2) | Smeets 36'; Thy 77'; Emegha 80' | Report | | Stadium: Het Kasteel; Attendance: 0 Referee: Bas Nijhuis |

| 13 May 2021 33 | Sparta Rotterdam | 0–0 | FC Utrecht | Rotterdam |
| 14:30 CEST (UTC+2) | Beugelsdijk (yellow card) 50'; Auassar (yellow card) 52'; Abels (yellow card) 90+4' | Report | Maher (yellow card) 52'; Boussaid (yellow card) 76' | Stadium: Het Kasteel; Attendance: 0 Referee: Ingmar Oostrom |

| 16 May 2021 34 | SC Heerenveen | 1–2 | Sparta Rotterdam | Heerenveen |
| 14:30 CEST (UTC+2) | De Jong 67'; Akujobi (yellow card) 84' | Report | Thy 7'; Burger 16'; Smeets (yellow card) 30' | Stadium: Abe Lenstra Stadion; Attendance: 0 Referee: Jeroen Manschot |

==== European competition play-offs ====
| 19 May 2021 Semi-finals | Feyenoord | 2–0 | Sparta Rotterdam | Rotterdam |
| 21:00 CEST (UTC+2) | Berghuis 31' (pen.); Beugelsdijk 33' (o.g.); Boženík (yellow card) 77' | Report | Beugelsdijk (yellow card) 77'; Abels (yellow card) 81' | Stadium: De Kuip; Attendance: 6,500; Referee: Jochem Kamphuis |

=== KNVB Cup ===
| 28 October 2020 First round | ADO Den Haag | 1–1 (a.e.t.) (4–3 p) | Sparta Rotterdam | The Hague |
| 18:45 CET (UTC+1) | Koopmans 90+4' | Report | Gravenberch 39' | Stadium: Cars Jeans Stadion; Attendance: 0 Referee: Siemen Mulder |
| | Penalties |
| | Kramer (penalty scored); Karelis (penalty scored); Pinas (penalty scored); Goossens (penalty scored); Ould-Chikh (penalty scored) | | (penalty scored) Heylen; (penalty scored) Abels; (penalty missed) Vriends; (penalty scored) Engels |
