= Mica Pinto =

Luxembourgish footballer (born 1993)

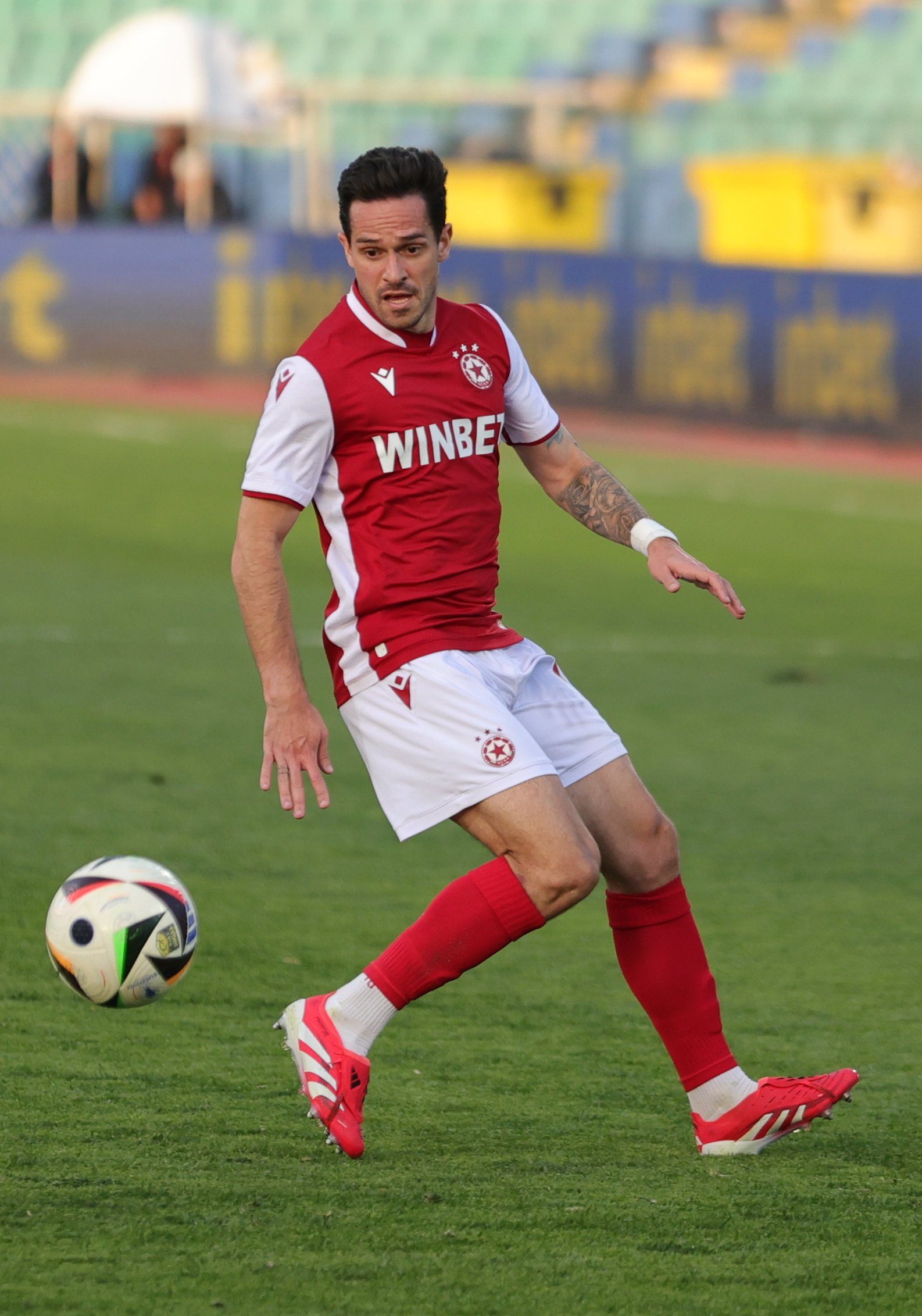
- Pinto with CSKA Sofia in 2025

Personal information
- Full name: Michael Gonçalves Pinto
- Date of birth: 4 June 1993 (age 33)
- Place of birth: Diekirch, Luxembourg
- Height: 1.76 m (5 ft 9 in)
- Position: Left-back

Youth career
- 2004–2005: Young Boys Diekirch
- 2005–2007: Metz
- 2007–2012: Sporting CP

Senior career*
Years	Team	Apps	(Gls)
2012–2015	Sporting CP B	85	(1)
2015	Recreativo	15	(0)
2016	Sporting CP B	5	(0)
2016–2018	Belenenses	6	(0)
2017	→ União Madeira (loan)	12	(0)
2018–2019	Fortuna Sittard	49	(1)
2020–2023	Sparta Rotterdam	85	(4)
2023–2024	Vitesse	23	(1)
2024–2025	CSKA Sofia	23	(1)
2026	Dordrecht	8	(0)

International career^{‡}
2010–2011	Portugal U18	9	(1)
2012–2013	Portugal U20	15	(1)
2020–	Luxembourg	43	(1)
- * Club domestic league appearances and goals as of 28 April 2026 ‡ National team caps and goals as of 15:59, 6 June 2026 (UTC)

Michael "Mica" Gonçalves Pinto (born 4 June 1993) is a Luxembourgish professional footballer who plays as a left-back for the Luxembourg national team.

He spent the early part of his career in the Segunda Liga, mainly with Sporting CP B. He totalled 102 matches in the competition over five seasons, adding six appearances in the Primeira Liga for Belenenses. He then played six years in the Dutch Eredivisie and one in the country's Eerste Divisie, representing Fortuna Sittard, Sparta Rotterdam and Vitesse.

Pinto represented Portugal at youth level, before switching to Luxembourg in 2020.

== Club career ==
Born in Diekirch, Luxembourg of Portuguese descent, Pinto joined Sporting CP's youth academy at the age of 14. He spent three full seasons with the reserve team in the Segunda Liga, making his debut in the competition on 11 August 2012 in a 1–0 away loss against U.D. Oliveirense and scoring his first goal on 24 February 2013 to help the hosts defeat S.C. Freamunde 5–1.

On 15 August 2015, Pinto was loaned to Spanish Segunda División B club Recreativo de Huelva alongside his teammates Kikas and Luís Ribeiro, with an option to buy. The following January, he terminated his contract alleging unpaid wages.

Pinto signed a permanent deal with C.F. Os Belenenses on 27 May 2016, with Sporting retaining 50% of his rights. He played his first match in the Primeira Liga on 19 August, coming on as a last-minute substitute in the 0–0 home draw with Boavista FC. Ahead of the 2017–18 campaign, he was loaned to C.F. União of the second tier.

In the January 2018 transfer window, Pinto agreed to a two-and-a-half-year contract at Fortuna Sittard of the Dutch Eerste Divisie. He contributed one goal from 14 appearances until the end of the season, as his side returned to the Eredivisie after a 16-year absence.

Pinto made his debut in the Dutch top flight on 11 August 2018, playing the entire 1–1 away draw against Excelsior Rotterdam. On 30 December 2019, Sparta Rotterdam announced that he would be joining the club the following month, and he eventually signed a contract until June 2021 with the option of one more year.

Pinto spent the 2023–24 campaign with SBV Vitesse, leaving by mutual consent at its conclusion. In August 2024, he signed for Bulgarian side CSKA Sofia.

== International career ==
Also eligible to represent Luxembourg, Pinto appeared for Portugal at the 2013 FIFA U-20 World Cup held in Turkey. He started all four games during the tournament, which ended in round-of-16 exit.

Pinto made his full debut for Luxembourg in a friendly against Liechtenstein on 7 October 2020.

== Career statistics ==
=== Club ===
As of match played 20 March 2026

Appearances and goals by club, season and competition
Club	Season	League			National cup		League cup		Europe		Other		Total	
Club	Season	Division	Apps	Goals	Apps	Goals	Apps	Goals	Apps	Goals	Apps	Goals	Apps	Goals
Sporting CP B	2012–13	Segunda Liga	35	1	—		—		—		—		35	1
Sporting CP B	2013–14	Segunda Liga	12	0	—		—		—		—		12	0
Sporting CP B	2014–15	Segunda Liga	37	0	—		—		—		—		37	0
Sporting CP B	Total		84	1	0	0	0	0	0	0	0	0	84	1
Recreativo	2015–16	Segunda División B	15	0	1	0	—		—		—		16	0
Sporting CP B	2015–16	Segunda Liga	5	0	—		—		—		—		5	0
Belenenses	2016–17	Primeira Liga	6	0	0	0	2	0	—		—		8	0
União Madeira (loan)	2017–18	LigaPro	12	0	3	0	1	0	—		—		16	0
Fortuna Sittard	2017–18	Eerste Divisie	14	1	—		—		—		—		14	1
Fortuna Sittard	2018–19	Eredivisie	28	0	1	0	—		—		—		29	0
Fortuna Sittard	2019–20	Eredivisie	7	0	—		—		—		—		7	0
Fortuna Sittard	Total		49	1	1	0	0	0	0	0	0	0	50	1
Sparta Rotterdam	2019–20	Eredivisie	3	0	—		—		—		—		3	0
Sparta Rotterdam	2020–21	Eredivisie	25	1	1	0	—		—		—		26	1
Sparta Rotterdam	2021–22	Eredivisie	24	0	2	0	—		—		—		26	0
Sparta Rotterdam	2022–23	Eredivisie	32	3	1	0	—		—		—		33	3
Sparta Rotterdam	Total		84	4	4	0	0	0	0	0	0	0	88	4
Vitesse	2023–24	Eredivisie	23	1	3	0	0	0	0	0	0	0	26	1
CSKA Sofia	2024–25	First League	21	1	5	0	—		—		0	0	26	1
CSKA Sofia	2025–26	First League	2	0	0	0	—		—		0	0	2	0
CSKA Sofia	Total		23	1	5	0	0	0	0	0	0	0	28	1
Dordrecht	2025–26	Eerste Divisie	3	0	0	0	—		—		—		3	0
Career total			304	8	17	0	3	0	0	0	0	0	324	8

=== International ===
As of match played 6 June 2026

Appearances and goals by national team and year
National team	Year	Apps	Goals
Luxembourg	2020	5	0
Luxembourg	2021	11	1
Luxembourg	2022	10	0
Luxembourg	2023	5	0
Luxembourg	2024	7	0
Luxembourg	2025	3	0
Luxembourg	2026	2	0
Total		43	1

Scores and results list Luxembourg's goal tally first.

No.	Date	Venue	Opponent	Score	Result	Competition
1.	1 September 2021	Stade de Luxembourg, Luxembourg City, Luxembourg	Azerbaijan	1–0	2–1	2022 FIFA World Cup qualification

== Honours ==
Individual

- Eredivisie Team of the Month: October 2022, March 2023, April 2023
