= Aaron Meijers =

Dutch footballer (born 1987)

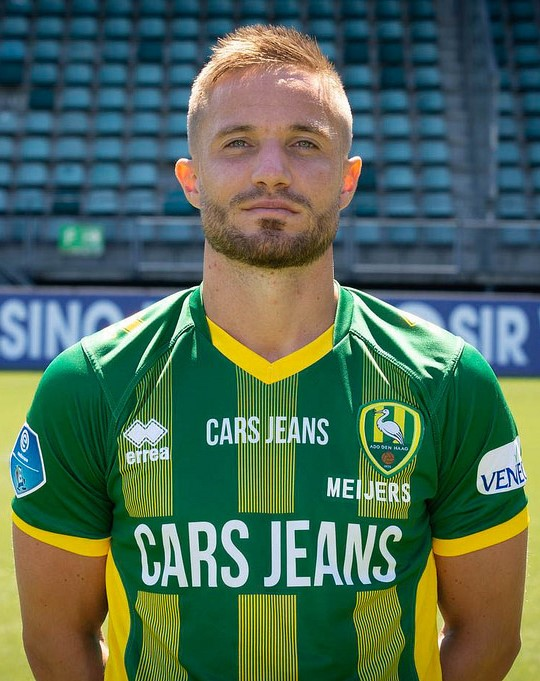
- Meijers with ADO Den Haag in 2018

Personal information
- Date of birth: 28 October 1987 (age 39)
- Place of birth: Delft, Netherlands
- Height: 1.76 m (5 ft 9 in)
- Position: Left back

Youth career
- 1993–2000: AVV Andijk
- 2000–2006: FC Volendam

Senior career*
Years	Team	Apps	(Gls)
2006–2010	FC Volendam	124	(4)
2010–2012	RKC Waalwijk	62	(4)
2012–2021	ADO Den Haag	237	(7)
2020–2021	→ Sparta (loan)	24	(0)
2021–2023	Sparta	25	(0)
2023–2025	RKC Waalwijk	45	(0)
2025–2026	FC Volendam	12	(0)
- * Club domestic league appearances and goals

Aaron Meijers (born 28 October 1987) is a Dutch former professional footballer who played as a left back.

== Club career ==
Meijers was born in Delft. Aged six he moved to Andijk, where he started playing for AVV Andijk (now Sporting Andijk). In 2000 Meijers joined FC Volendam. After four years in the first team of FC Volendam he moved to RKC Waalwijk. With both FC Volendam and RKC Waalwijk Meijers won the Eerste Divisie. In 2012 Meijers went to ADO Den Haag.

For the 2020–21 season, he was loaned to Sparta Rotterdam. After returning to ADO Den Haag and beginning the 2021–22 season there, on 30 August 2021 he returned to Sparta on a permanent basis.

In the summer of 2023, Meijers returned to RKC Waalwijk on a one-season deal.

On 31 July 2025, Meijers returned to FC Volendam for one season.

== International career ==
Meijers, along with fellow ADO player Jens Toornstra was invited to train with the national team in 2012 by Louis van Gaal.

== Career statistics ==
As of match played 2 September 2023

Appearances and goals by club, season and competition
Club	Season	League			KNVB Beker		Europe		Other		Total	
Club	Season	Division	Apps	Goals	Apps	Goals	Apps	Goals	Apps	Goals	Apps	Goals
FC Volendam	2006–07	Eerste Divisie	21	0	0	0	—		2	0	23	0
FC Volendam	2007–08	Eerste Divisie	36	2	0	0	—		0	0	36	2
FC Volendam	2008–09	Eredivisie	31	0	3	0	—		0	0	34	0
FC Volendam	2009–10	Eerste Divisie	36	2	0	0	—		0	0	36	2
FC Volendam	Total		124	4	3	0	—		2	0	129	4
RKC Waalwijk	2010–11	Eerste Divisie	30	1	4	0	—		0	0	34	1
RKC Waalwijk	2011–12	Eredivisie	32	3	4	0	—		4	0	40	3
RKC Waalwijk	Total		62	4	8	0	—		4	0	74	4
ADO Den Haag	2012–13	Eredivisie	31	0	2	0	—		0	0	33	0
ADO Den Haag	2013–14	Eredivisie	34	1	2	0	—		0	0	36	1
ADO Den Haag	2014–15	Eredivisie	33	0	1	0	—		0	0	34	0
ADO Den Haag	2015–16	Eredivisie	30	1	1	0	—		0	0	31	1
ADO Den Haag	2016–17	Eredivisie	19	0	1	0	—		0	0	20	0
ADO Den Haag	2017–18	Eredivisie	33	1	1	0	—		2	0	36	1
ADO Den Haag	2018–19	Eredivisie	31	2	2	0	—		0	0	33	2
ADO Den Haag	2019–20	Eredivisie	26	2	1	0	—		0	0	27	2
ADO Den Haag	Total		237	7	11	0	—		2	0	250	7
Sparta Rotterdam (loan)	2020–21	Eredivisie	24	0	1	0	—		—		25	0
Sparta Rotterdam	2021–22	Eredivisie	12	0	2	0	—		—		14	0
Sparta Rotterdam	2022–23	Eredivisie	13	0	1	0	—		—		14	0
Sparta Rotterdam	Total		25	0	3	0	—		—		28	0
RKC Waalwijk	2023–24	Eredivisie	2	0	0	0	—		—		2	0
Career total			474	15	30	0	8	0	0	0	512	15

== Honours ==
=== Club ===
AVV Andijk FC Volendam

- Eerste Divisie: 2007–08

RKC Waalwijk

- Eerste Divisie: 2010–11
