= Mario Engels =

German footballer (born 1993)

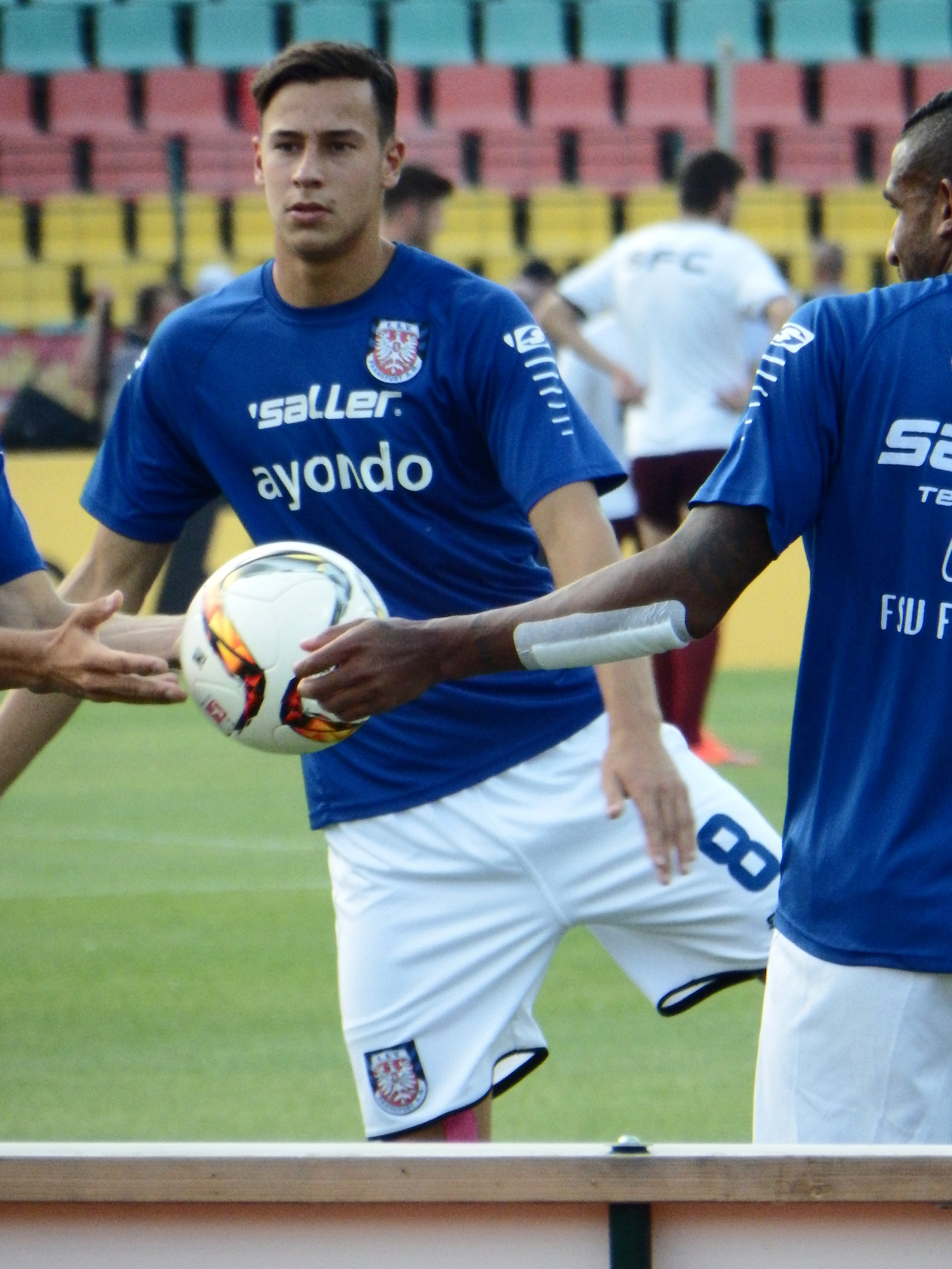
- Engels in 2015

Personal information
- Date of birth: 22 October 1993 (age 33)
- Place of birth: Troisdorf, Germany
- Height: 1.85 m (6 ft 1 in)
- Position: Winger

Team information
- Current team: Heracles Almelo
- Number: 8

Youth career
- SV Allner-Bödingen
- TuS Mondorf
- 2008–2012: 1. FC Köln

Senior career*
Years	Team	Apps	(Gls)
2011–2014	1. FC Köln II	49	(4)
2014–2016	FSV Frankfurt	43	(2)
2016–2017	Śląsk Wrocław	17	(3)
2016–2017	Śląsk Wrocław II	3	(0)
2017–2019	Roda JC	55	(24)
2019–2020	SV Sandhausen	24	(3)
2020–2022	Sparta Rotterdam	65	(5)
2023	Tokyo Verdy	14	(0)
2023–	Heracles Almelo	89	(10)
- * Club domestic league appearances and goals as of 21 May 2026

Mario Engels (born 22 October 1993) is a German professional footballer who plays as a winger for Dutch Eerste Divisie club Heracles Almelo.

== Club career ==
Engels began his career with SV Allner-Bödingen and later played for TuS Mondorf before moving to 1. FC Köln's academy in 2008. In 2012, he was promoted to the second team's squad, competing in Regionalliga West. On 5 May 2012, he made his senior debut against SV Elversberg, replacing Lucas Musculus in the 74th minute of a 2–1 away loss. One year later, on 13 May 2013, during a resounding 9–0 victory against MSV Duisburg II, he scored his first goal.

Ahead of the 2014–15 season, Engels joined 2. Bundesliga club FSV Frankfurt and made his debut against Karlsruher SC on 8 August 2014. He scored his first goal for the club on 30 November 2014, helping secure a 2–0 win over 1860 Munich. After the 2015–16 season, as the club was relegated to the 3. Liga, Engels left the team.

In August 2016, Engels joined Polish Ekstraklasa club Śląsk Wrocław. In July 2017, he moved to Dutch Eredivisie club Roda JC, suffering relegation with the club at the end of the season. In the second division, Engels emerged as his team's top goalscorer, netting 24 goals and securing the second spot on the league's top goalscorers' list, but the team could not secure promotion in the end.

His impressive performance caught the attention of 2. Bundesliga club SV Sandhausen, who secured his services ahead of the 2019–20 season, providing him with a two-year contract.

On 4 October 2020, Engels returned to the Netherlands, signing a two-year contract with Sparta Rotterdam.

On 7 December 2022, it was officially announced that Engels would join Japanese J2 League side Tokyo Verdy for the 2023 season.

On 19 July 2023, Engels returned to the Netherlands for a second time and signed a two-year deal with recently promoted Eredivisie club Heracles Almelo.

== Career statistics ==
As of match played 20 October 2024

Appearances and goals by club, season and competition
Club	Season	League			National cup (Note: Includes DFB-Pokal, Polish Cup, KNVB Cup)		Continental		Other		Total	
Club	Season	Division	Apps	Goals	Apps	Goals	Apps	Goals	Apps	Goals	Apps	Goals
Köln II	2012–13	Regionalliga West	17	1	—		—		—		17	1
Köln II	2013–14	Regionalliga West	31	3	—		—		—		31	3
Köln II	Total		48	4	—		—		—		48	4
FSV Frankfurt	2014–15	2. Bundesliga	26	2	2	0	—		—		28	2
FSV Frankfurt	2015–16	2. Bundesliga	17	0	0	0	—		—		17	0
FSV Frankfurt	Total		43	2	2	0	—		—		45	2
Śląsk Wrocław	2016–17	Ekstraklasa	17	3	1	0	—		—		18	3
Śląsk Wrocław II	2016–17	III liga, gr. I	3	0	—		—		—		3	0
Roda JC	2017–18	Eredivisie	21	1	3	1	—		2 (Note: Appearances in Eredivisie play-offs)	0	26	2
Roda JC	2018–19	Eerste Divisie	34	24	3	1	—		—		37	25
Roda JC	Total		55	25	6	2	—		2	0	63	27
SV Sandhausen	2019–20	2. Bundesliga	24	3	1	0	—		—		25	3
SV Sandhausen	2020–21	2. Bundesliga	0	0	1	0	—		—		1	0
SV Sandhausen	Total		24	3	2	0	—		—		26	3
Sparta Rotterdam	2020–21	Eredivisie	27	3	1	0	1 (Note: Appearance in UEFA Europa Conference League)	0	—		29	3
Sparta Rotterdam	2021–22	Eredivisie	29	1	2	1	—		—		31	2
Sparta Rotterdam	2022–23	Eredivisie	9	1	1	0	—		—		10	1
Sparta Rotterdam	Total		65	5	4	0	1	0	—		70	6
Tokyo Verdy	2023	J2 League	14	0	0	0	—		—		14	0
Heracles Almelo	2023–24	Eredivisie	34	5	1	0	—		—		35	5
Heracles Almelo	2024–25	Eredivisie	9	3	0	0	—		—		9	3
Heracles Almelo	Total		43	8	1	0	—		—		44	8
Career total			309	50	16	0	1	0	2	0	328	53
