= Bart Vriends =

Dutch footballer

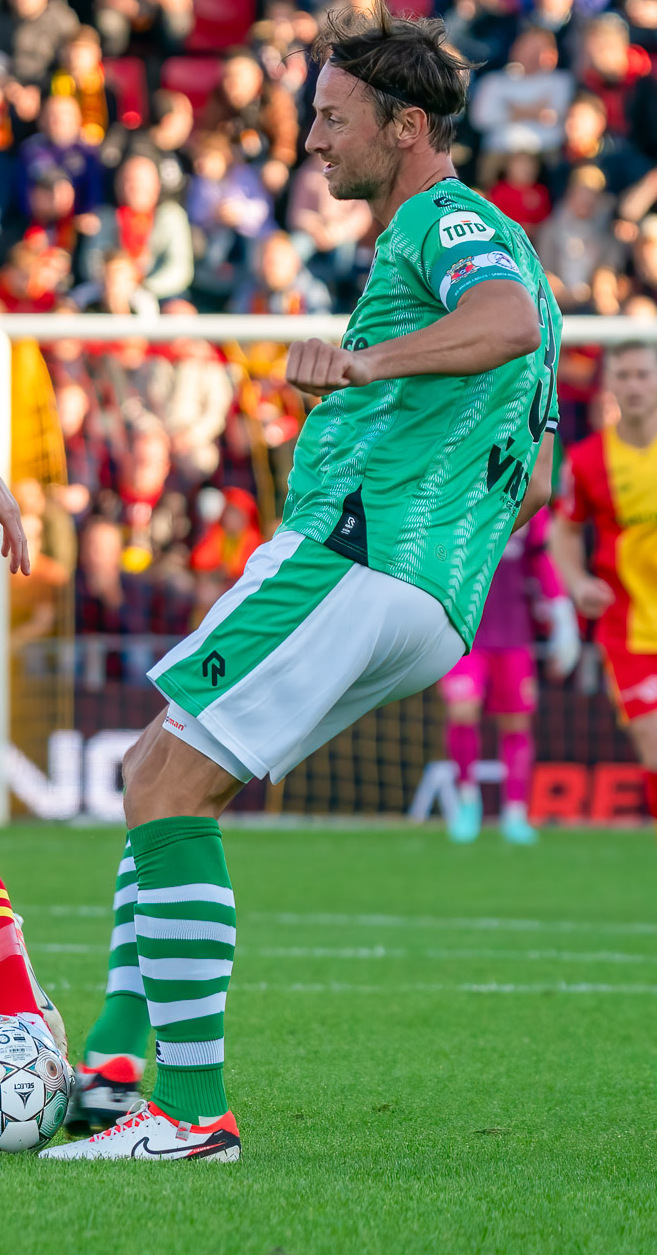
- Vriends with Sparta Rotterdam in 2023

Personal information
- Date of birth: 9 May 1991 (age 35)
- Place of birth: Amersfoort, Netherlands
- Height: 1.88 m (6 ft 2 in)
- Position: Centre back

Team information
- Current team: Adelaide United
- Number: 3

Youth career
- VVZA Amersfoort
- Utrecht

Senior career*
Years	Team	Apps	(Gls)
2012–2013	Utrecht	0	(0)
2013	→ Go Ahead Eagles (loan)	15	(1)
2013–2016	Go Ahead Eagles	98	(4)
2016–2018	Jong Sparta Rotterdam	4	(1)
2016–2024	Sparta Rotterdam	192	(11)
2024–	Adelaide United	44	(2)
- * Club domestic league appearances and goals as of 1 March 2025

Bart Vriends (Dutch: [bɑrt ˈvrints]; born 9 May 1991) is a Dutch professional footballer who plays as a centre back for Adelaide United in the A-League Men. He previously played for FC Utrecht, Go Ahead Eagles and most notably Sparta Rotterdam, having played over 200 games for the club.

== Career ==
=== Utrecht ===
Born in Amersfoort, Vriends began his senior career through FC Utrecht's youth program. On the list for the Eredivisie team in the 2012-13 season, Vriends went on loan to Go Ahead Eagles before he was able to make his senior debut.

=== Go Ahead Eagles ===
Playing 15 games while on loan and helping the club reach promotion out of Eerste Divisie, GA Eagles eventually bought Vriends from Utrecht ahead of the 2013-14 Eredivisie season.

Vriends gave his club a first victory of the 2014-15 season when his goal against Willem II was without response in August 2014. In the same match, Vriends received his only senior red card, just five minutes after his 64th-minute winner.

=== Sparta Rotterdam ===
In 2016, Vriends made a free transfer from GA Eagles to Sparta Rotterdam following 113 appearances for the former. The move proved to be highly successful for Vriends, who captained the club across eight years and made 215 total appearances, becoming the first Sparta Rotterdam player to do so in over 20 years. Vriends captained Sparta to a first-place finish in the 2015-16 Eerste Divisie, achieving promotion to the Eredivisie after six years in the Dutch second division. He also captained the club to a semi-final in the 2016–17 KNVB Cup.

Following another few years which included a brief relegation and subsequent promotion, Vriends would go on to leave the club in 2024 following an eighth-placed 2023-24 Eredivisie finish for Sparta.

=== Adelaide United ===
Vriends signed to Australian A-League club Adelaide United in July 2024 on a free transfer. Former Sparta teammate Craig Goodwin was an influence in Vriends' decision, as Goodwin is one of Adelaide's all-time most prolific players. Vriends did not play in the 2024 Australia Cup due to injury fears from coach Carl Veart. He went on to make his Adelaide debut early in the 2024-25 season, and scored his first goal for the club in a 2–2 draw against Perth Glory. Vriends again scored for Adelaide, this time in the 98th minute to equalise 4–4 against Auckland FC.

== Career statistics ==
As of match played 11 August 2026

Appearances and goals by club, season and competition
Club	Season	League			Cup		Continental		Other		Total	
Club	Season	Division	Apps	Goals	Apps	Goals	Apps	Goals	Apps	Goals	Apps	Goals
Jong Utrecht	2011–12	Beloften Eredivisie	6	0	—		—		—		6	0
Jong Utrecht	2012–13	Beloften Eredivisie	5	0	—		—		—		5	0
Jong Utrecht	Total		11	0	—		—		—		11	0
Go Ahead Eagles (loan)	2012–13	Eerste Divisie	15	1	0	0	0	0	5 (Note: Appearances in Eerste Divisie playoffs)	0	20	1
Go Ahead Eagles	2013–14	Eredivisie	32	0	2	0	—		—		34	0
Go Ahead Eagles	2014–15	Eredivisie	31	3	2	0	—		2 (Note: Appearances in Eredivisie playoffs)	0	35	3
Go Ahead Eagles	2015–16	Eerste Divisie	35	1	2	0	2 (Note: Appearances in UEFA Europa League)	0	4	0	35	1
Go Ahead Eagles	Total		98	4	6	0	2	0	6	0	104	4
Sparta Rotterdam	2016–17	Eredivisie	18	0	3	1	—		—		21	1
Sparta Rotterdam	2017–18	Eredivisie	10	0	1	0	—		3	0	14	0
Sparta Rotterdam	2018–19	Eerste Divisie	26	2	1	0	—		3	0	30	2
Sparta Rotterdam	2019–20	Eredivisie	26	2	2	0	—		—		28	2
Sparta Rotterdam	2020–21	Eredivisie	23	0	1	0	—		1 (Note: Appearance in UEFA Europa Conference League)	0	25	0
Sparta Rotterdam	2021–22	Eredivisie	33	3	1	0	—		—		34	3
Sparta Rotterdam	2022–23	Eredivisie	30	2	1	0	—		4	0	35	2
Sparta Rotterdam	2023–24	Eredivisie	26	2	1	0	—		1	0	28	2
Sparta Rotterdam	Total		192	11	11	1	—		12	0	215	12
Jong Sparta Rotterdam	2016–17	Tweede Divisie	1	0	—		—		—		1	0
Jong Sparta Rotterdam	2017–18	Tweede Divisie	3	1	—		—		—		3	1
Jong Sparta Rotterdam	Total		4	1	—		—		—		4	1
Adelaide United	2024–25	A-League	24	2	0	0	—		—		24	2
Adelaide United	2025–26	A-League	22	0	1	0	—		—		23	0
Adelaide United	2026–27	A-League	0	0	1	0	1 (Note: Appearance in AFC Champions League Elite)	0	—		2	0
Adelaide United	Total		46	2	2	0	1	0	—		49	2
Career total			366	19	19	1	3	0	23	0	403	20

== Honours ==
Individual

- Eredivisie Team of the Month: November 2023
