= Abdou Harroui =

Dutch footballer

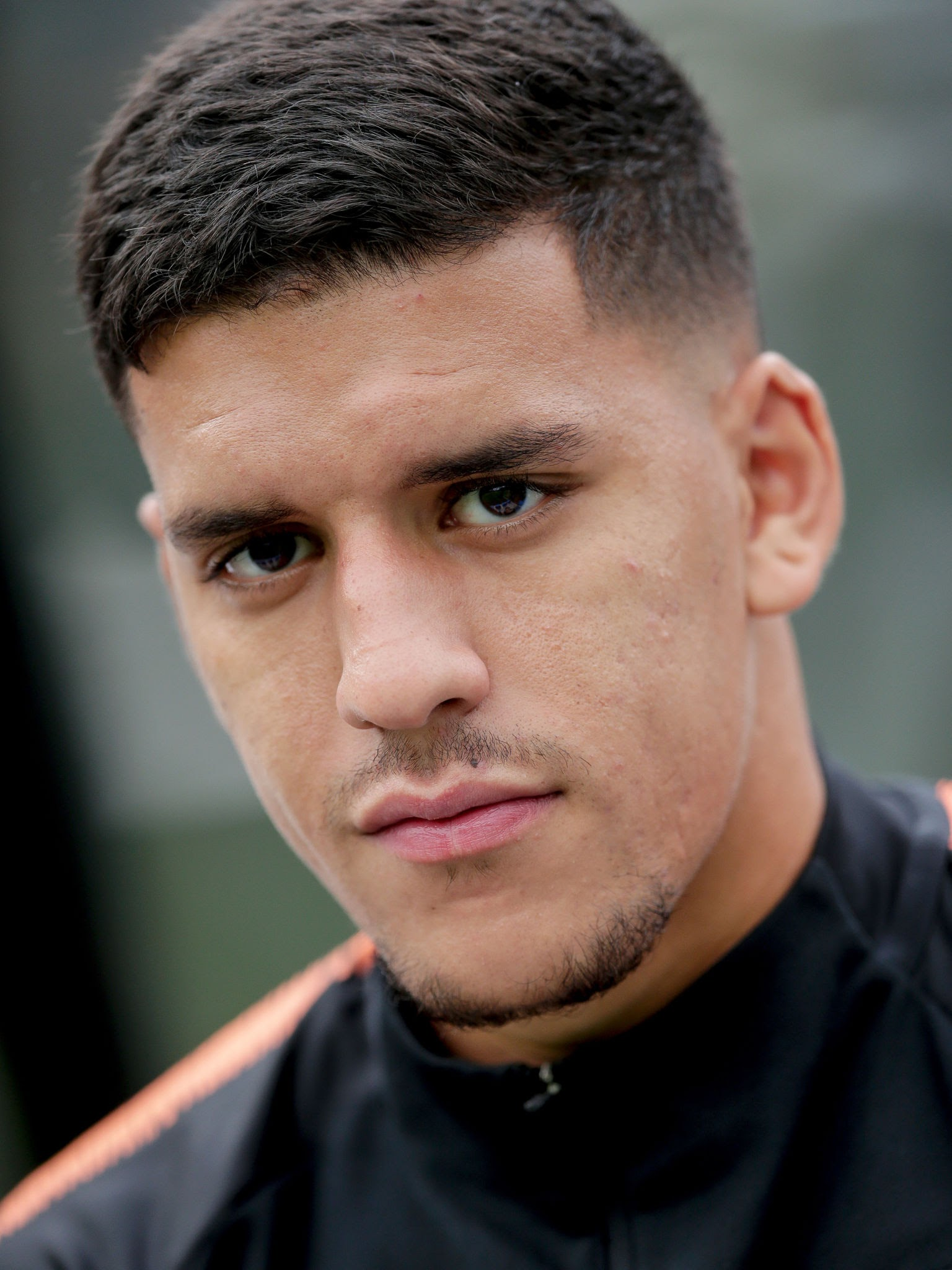
- Harroui in 2021

Personal information
- Full name: Abdoulrahmane Harroui
- Date of birth: 13 January 1998 (age 28)
- Place of birth: Leiden, Netherlands
- Height: 1.82 m (6 ft 0 in)
- Position: Midfielder

Team information
- Current team: Hellas Verona
- Number: 21

Youth career
- Roodenburg
- –2012: UVS
- 2012–2014: Alphense Boys
- 2014–2018: Sparta

Senior career*
Years	Team	Apps	(Gls)
2016–2018	Jong Sparta	45	(10)
2018–2022	Sparta	95	(14)
2021–2022	→ Sassuolo (loan)	22	(0)
2022–2023	Sassuolo	23	(2)
2023–2024	Frosinone	18	(3)
2024–	Hellas Verona	37	(2)

International career^{‡}
2018	Netherlands U20	2	(0)
2019–2021	Netherlands U21	13	(1)
- * Club domestic league appearances and goals as of 1 October 2026 ‡ National team caps and goals as of 3 June 2021

Abdoulrahmane "Abdou" Harroui (Arabic: عبدو هروي; born 13 January 1998) is a professional footballer who plays as a midfielder for Serie B club Hellas Verona.

Born in the Netherlands, he represented his native country internationally at youth level, before opting to play for Morocco at senior level.

== Club career ==
Harroui was born in Leiden and only started playing aged 14 with local amateur club Roodenburg. He later played for Alphense Boys and made his Eredivisie debut for Sparta Rotterdam on 24 February 2018 in a game against AZ.

On 31 August 2021, he joined Italian club Sassuolo on initial loan, with a conditional obligation to buy at the end of the 2021–22 season.

On 13 July 2023, he joined Frosinone until the end of the 2025–26 season.

== International career ==
Born in the Netherlands, Harroui is of Moroccan descent. He is a former youth international for the Netherlands. He represented Netherlands at the 2021 UEFA European Under-21 Championship, where Netherlands reached the semi-finals, and Harroui was substituted at half-time of that game.

In September 2021, he accepted a call-up to the Morocco national team for the World Cup qualifiers.

== Career statistics ==
=== Club ===
As of match played 15 February 2026

Appearances and goals by club, season and competition
Club	Season	League			National Cup		Europe		Other		Total	
Club	Season	Division	Apps	Goals	Apps	Goals	Apps	Goals	Apps	Goals	Apps	Goals
Jong Sparta Rotterdam	2016–17	Tweede Divisie	20	1	—		—		—		20	1
Jong Sparta Rotterdam	2017–18	Tweede Divisie	25	9	—		—		—		25	9
Jong Sparta Rotterdam	Total		45	10	—		—		—		45	10
Sparta Rotterdam	2017–18	Eredivisie	1	0	—		—		1 (Note: Appearance in Eredivisie promotion/relegation play-offs)	0	2	0
Sparta Rotterdam	2018–19	Eerste Divisie	35	4	1	2	—		4	2	40	8
Sparta Rotterdam	2019–20	Eredivisie	26	4	0	0	—		—		26	4
Sparta Rotterdam	2020–21	Eredivisie	32	6	1	0	—		1 (Note: Appearance in Eredivisie European competition play-offs)	0	34	6
Sparta Rotterdam	2021–22	Eredivisie	1	0	—		—		—		1	0
Sparta Rotterdam	Total		95	14	2	2	—		6	2	103	18
Sassuolo (loan)	2021–22	Serie A	22	0	2	1	—		—		24	1
Sassuolo	2022–23	Serie A	23	2	1	0	—		—		24	2
Sassuolo	Total		45	2	3	1	—		—		48	3
Frosinone	2023–24	Serie A	18	3	3	1	—		—		21	4
Hellas Verona	2024–25	Serie A	10	1	1	0	—		—		11	1
Hellas Verona	2025–26	Serie A	14	1	0	0	—		—		14	1
Hellas Verona	Total		24	2	1	0	—		—		25	2
Career total			227	31	9	4	0	0	6	2	242	37
