= Bradley Martis =

Aruban footballer (born 1998)

Personal information
- Full name: Bradley Leonard Martis
- Date of birth: 13 July 1998 (age 28)
- Place of birth: The Hague, Netherlands
- Height: 1.83 m (6 ft 0 in)
- Positions: Left-back; centre-back

Team information
- Current team: AFC
- Number: 5

Youth career
- 2006–2018: Sparta Rotterdam

Senior career*
Years	Team	Apps	(Gls)
2017–2020	Jong Sparta Rotterdam	38	(1)
2018–2020	Sparta Rotterdam	10	(0)
2020–2022	Celje	9	(0)
2022–2025	IJsselmeervogels	102	(3)
2025–	AFC	9	(0)

International career^{‡}
2018–2023	Curaçao	6	(0)
2025–	Aruba	8	(0)
- * Club domestic league appearances and goals as of 18:21, 21 October 2025 (UTC) ‡ National team caps and goals as of 23 September 2026

Bradley Martis (born 13 July 1998) is a professional footballer who plays as a left-back for Tweede Divisie club AFC. Born in the Netherlands, Martis first played for the Curaçao national team before switching to the Aruba national team in 2025.

== Club career ==
Martis made his professional debut for Sparta Rotterdam in a 2–1 Eerste Divisie loss to FC Twente on 17 August 2018. On 28 August 2018, he signed his first professional contract with Sparta for one year.

== International career ==
Martis made his professional debut for the Curaçao national team in a 10–0 CONCACAF Nations League win over Grenada on 10 September 2018. In March 2025, he opted to play for the Aruba national team.
