= Lorenzo Fonseca =

Dutch footballer

Personal information
- Full name: Lorenzo Soares Fonseca
- Date of birth: 17 November 1998 (age 27)
- Place of birth: Rotterdam, Netherlands
- Height: 1.89 m (6 ft 2 in)
- Position: Centre-back

Team information
- Current team: Spartaan '20

Youth career
- Spartaan '20

Senior career*
Years	Team	Apps	(Gls)
2016–2021	Jong Sparta	72	(4)
2019–2021	Spaarta	2	(0)
2021	Den Bosch	10	(1)
2021–2022	Académica de Coimbra	3	(0)
2022	St. Lucia	11	(1)
2022–2023	Hibernians	0	(0)
2022–2023	→ St. Lucia (on loan)	19	(0)
2023	Ceahlăul Piatra Neamț	1	(0)
2024–2025	Barendrecht	1	(0)
2025–	Spartaan '20		

International career
2019–2021	Cape Verde	2	(0)
- * Club domestic league appearances and goals as of 23 October 2024

Lorenzo Soares Fonseca (born 17 November 1998) is a professional footballer who plays as a centre-back for Spartaan '20. Born in the Netherlands, Fonseca represents the Cape Verde national football team.

== Club career ==
Fonseca made his professional debut with Sparta Rotterdam in a 2–2 Eerste Divisie tie with Jong Ajax on 26 April 2019. His contract with Sparta Rotterdam was terminated on 1 February 2021.

Fonseca signed for FC Den Bosch on a contract until the end of the season on 2 February 2021.

On 9 July 2021, he joined Académica de Coimbra in Portugal. He later had a spell with Maltese outfit St. Lucia and in Romania with Ceahlăul Piatra Neamț.

He returned to childhood club Spartaan '20 in summer 2025.

== International career ==
Born in the Netherlands, Fonseca is of Cape Verdean descent. He debuted for the Cape Verde national football team in a friendly 2–1 win over Togo on 10 October 2019.
