= Gaultiér Overman =

Dutch footballer (born 2000)

Personal information
- Date of birth: 15 November 2000 (age 25)
- Place of birth: Maassluis, Netherlands
- Position: Left-back

Team information
- Current team: Excelsior Maassluis
- Number: 5

Youth career
- –2020: Dordrecht

Senior career*
Years	Team	Apps	(Gls)
2020	Dordrecht	1	(0)
2020–2023	Jong Sparta	63	(0)
2021	Sparta	2	(0)
2023–	Excelsior Maassluis	26	(0)
- * Club domestic league appearances and goals as of 15 October 2024

Gaultiér Overman (born 15 November 2000) is a Dutch footballer who plays as a left-back for Excelsior Maassluis.
