= Michaël Heylen =

Belgian footballer (born 1994)

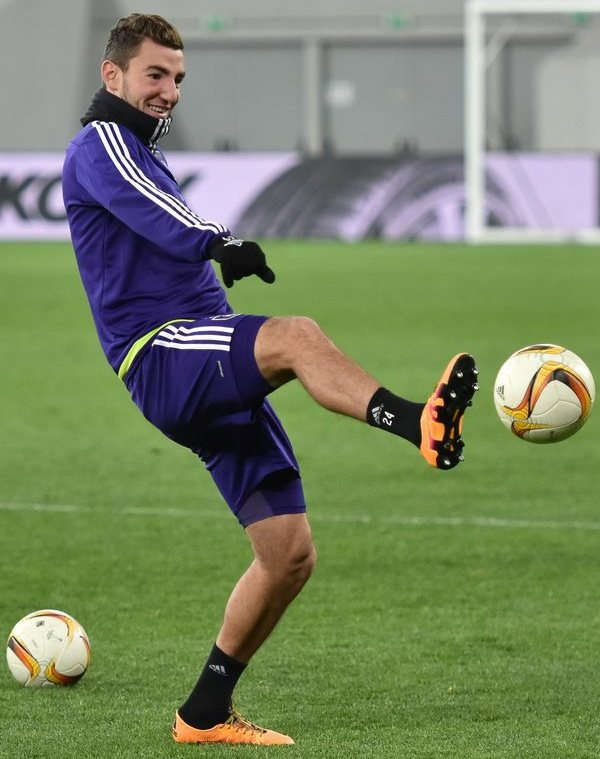

Personal information
- Date of birth: 3 January 1994 (age 32)
- Place of birth: Wommelgem, Belgium
- Height: 1.87 m (6 ft 2 in)
- Position: Centre-back

Youth career
- 2000–2002: Ternesse VV
- 2002–2007: Germinal Beerschot
- 2007–2013: Anderlecht

Senior career*
Years	Team	Apps	(Gls)
2013–2017	Anderlecht	24	(0)
2013–2014	→ Kortrijk (loan)	29	(0)
2016–2017	→ Westerlo (loan)	24	(1)
2017–2019	Zulte Waregem	33	(1)
2019–2020	Emmen	19	(0)
2020–2022	Sparta	44	(0)
2022–2024	Emmen	52	(1)
2024–2025	Omonia 29M	12	(0)

International career
2013–2016	Belgium U21	15	(1)
- * Club domestic league appearances and goals as of 12:10, 15 March 2025 (UTC)

Michaël Heylen (born 3 January 1994) is a Belgian professional footballer who plays as a centre-back.

== Club career ==
Heylen joined Anderlecht in 2007 from Germinal Beerschot. As a 16-year-old he was diagnosed with Crohn's disease. However, he made it to the reserve team and became its captain. In 2013, Anderlecht decided to loan Heylen out to Kortrijk for the 2013–14 season. He made his full debut at 14 September 2013 against Gent in a 3–0 home win.

On 6 July 2022, Heylen returned to Emmen on a two-year deal.

On 17 August 2024, Heylen signed with PAC Omonia 29M in Cyprus.

== International career ==
In August 2016 he was asked to train with the senior Belgium squad by new manager Roberto Martinez.
