= 2019–20 Eredivisie =

64th season of the Eredivisie

Eredivisie
- Season: 2019–20
- Dates: 2 August 2019 – 8 March 2020
- Champions: None
- Relegated: None
- Champions League: Ajax; AZ
- Europa League: Feyenoord; PSV Eindhoven; Willem II
- Matches: 232
- Goals: 715 (3.08 per match)
- Top goalscorer: Steven Berghuis; Cyriel Dessers (15 goals each)
- Biggest home win: Utrecht 6–0 Fortuna Sittard (3 November 2019)
- Biggest away win: Heracles Almelo 0–4 Heerenveen (4 August 2019); PEC Zwolle 0–4 PSV Eindhoven (29 September 2019); VVV-Venlo 0–4 Vitesse (19 October 2019); PSV Eindhoven 0–4 AZ (27 October 2019)
- Highest scoring: PEC Zwolle 6–2 RKC Waalwijk (15 September 2019)
- Longest winning run: 8 matches Ajax
- Longest unbeaten run: 15 matches Ajax
- Longest winless run: 11 matches RKC Waalwijk
- Longest losing run: 8 matches RKC Waalwijk
- Highest attendance: 54,022; Ajax 0–2 Willem II (6 December 2019)
- Lowest attendance: 4,689; RKC Waalwijk 2–0 Heracles Almelo (2 November 2019)
- Total attendance: 4,229,375
- Average attendance: 18,230

The 2019–20 Eredivisie was the 64th season of the Dutch football league Eredivisie since its establishment in 1955. The season began on 2 August 2019 and was suspended on 12 March 2020 due to the COVID-19 pandemic in the Netherlands. The season was abandoned on 24 April.

Ajax were the defending champion. Twente, RKC Waalwijk, and Sparta Rotterdam joined as the promoted clubs from the 2018–19 Eerste Divisie. They replaced NAC Breda, Excelsior, and De Graafschap who were relegated to the 2019–20 Eerste Divisie.

== Effects of the COVID-19 pandemic ==
On 12 March 2020, all football leagues were suspended until 31 March as the Dutch government prohibited events due to the COVID-19 pandemic in the Netherlands. On 15 March this period was extended until 6 April. Following the decision of the Dutch government to prohibit all gatherings and events until 1 June 2020, this period was further extended.

On 2 April, several clubs, including Ajax, AZ and PSV, indicated they were not willing to play the remainder of the season.

The Dutch government announced on 21 April that all events subject to authorization would remain prohibited until at least 1 September 2020. As a result, the KNVB announced on the same day that it did not intend to resume the 2019–20 season. A final decision would be taken after consultation with the UEFA and debating the consequences with the clubs involved.

On 24 April 2020 the KNVB announced their final decision:

- The ranking on 8 March 2020 is the final ranking, but Ajax will not be champions.
- There will be no promotion nor relegation between the Eredivisie and Eerste Divisie.
- European places will be assigned based on the ranking on 8 March: Champions League for Ajax and AZ, and Europa League for Feyenoord, PSV, and Willem II.

The KNVB had intended to resume the season on 19 June behind closed doors, but announced in a statement that the government's decision to ban all public events until September made it impossible to finish the season on time.

== Teams ==
A total of 18 teams took part in the league.

Locations of the 2019–20 Eredivisie teams
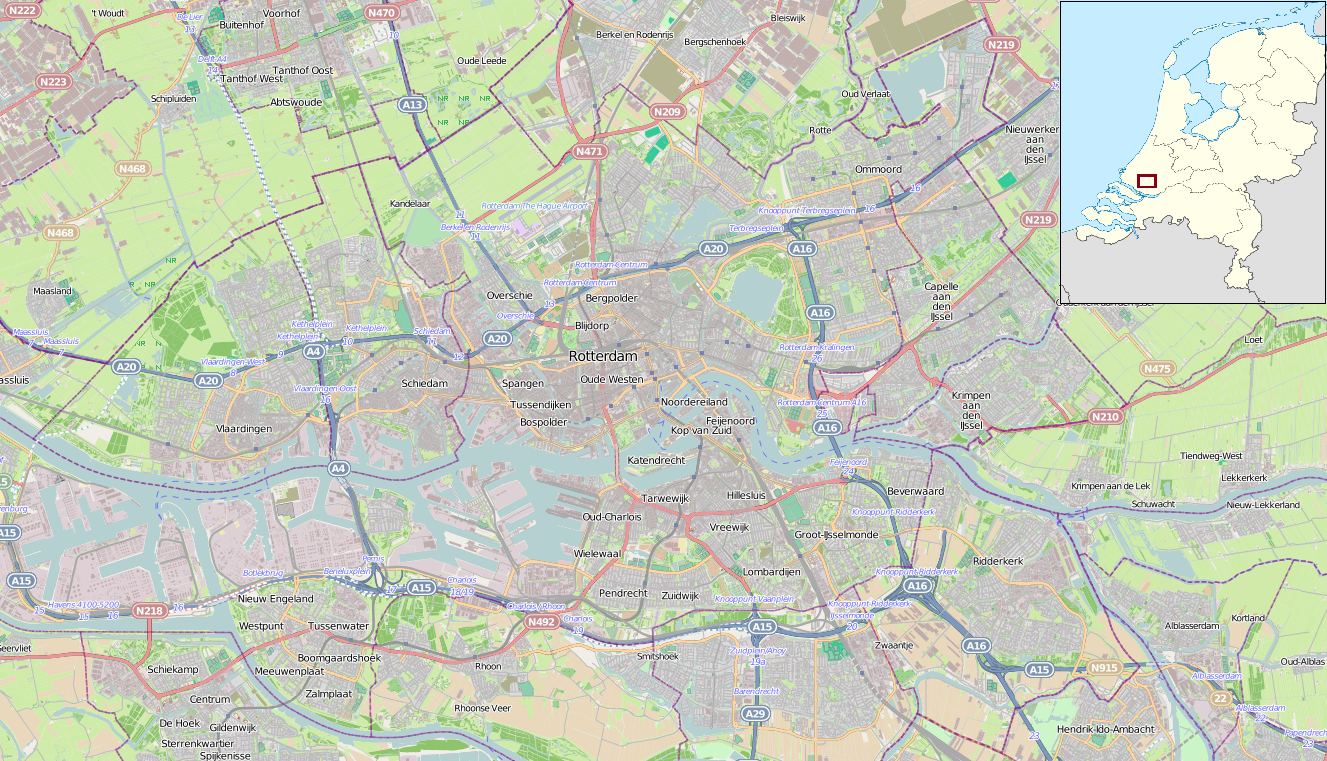
Rotterdam Eredivisie football clubs

=== Stadiums and locations ===
| Club | Location | Venue | Capacity |
|---|---|---|---|
| ADO Den Haag | The Hague | Cars Jeans Stadion | 15,000 |
| Ajax | Amsterdam | Johan Cruyff Arena | 54,990 |
| AZ | Alkmaar | AFAS Stadion | 17,023 |
| Emmen | Emmen | De Oude Meerdijk | 8,600 |
| Feyenoord | Rotterdam | De Kuip | 52,000 |
| Fortuna Sittard | Sittard | Fortuna Sittard Stadion | 10,300 |
| Groningen | Groningen | Noordlease Stadion | 22,550 |
| Heerenveen | Heerenveen | Abe Lenstra Stadion | 27,224 |
| Heracles Almelo | Almelo | Erve Asito | 12,080 |
| PEC Zwolle | Zwolle | MAC³PARK Stadion | 14,000 |
| PSV Eindhoven | Eindhoven | Philips Stadion | 36,500 |
| RKC Waalwijk | Waalwijk | Mandemakers Stadion | 7,500 |
| Sparta Rotterdam | Rotterdam | Het Kasteel | 11,000 |
| Twente | Enschede | De Grolsch Veste | 30,205 |
| Utrecht | Utrecht | Stadion Galgenwaard | 23,750 |
| Vitesse | Arnhem | GelreDome | 21,248 |
| VVV-Venlo | Venlo | Seacon Stadion – De Koel | 8,000 |
| Willem II | Tilburg | Koning Willem II Stadion | 14,500 |

AZ only played their first home game at AFAS Stadion due to the stadium's roof collapse on 10 August 2019. From then on they've played their home matches at the 17,000-capacity Cars Jeans Stadion in The Hague, home of ADO Den Haag. AZ returned to their 'roofless' AFAS Stadion for the match against Ajax on 15 December 2019.

=== Personnel and kits ===
Note: Flags indicate national team as has been defined under FIFA eligibility rules. Players and managers may hold more than one non-FIFA nationality.

| Team | Manager | Captain | Kit manufacturer | Shirt sponsor |
|---|---|---|---|---|
| ADO Den Haag | (England) Alan Pardew | (Netherlands) Aaron Meijers | Erreà | Cars Jeans |
| Ajax | (Netherlands) Erik ten Hag | (Serbia) Dušan Tadić | Adidas | Ziggo |
| AZ | (Netherlands) Arne Slot | (Netherlands) Teun Koopmeiners | Under Armour | AFAS Software |
| Emmen | (Netherlands) Dick Lukkien | (Netherlands) Anco Jansen | Hummel | Hitachi Capital Mobility |
| Feyenoord | (Netherlands) Dick Advocaat | (Netherlands) Steven Berghuis | Adidas | Droomparken |
| Fortuna Sittard | (Netherlands) Sjors Ultee | (Netherlands) Wessel Dammers | Masita | Sparr Finance |
| Groningen | (Netherlands) Danny Buijs | (Netherlands) Mike te Wierik | Puma | Payt |
| Heerenveen | (Netherlands) Johnny Jansen | (Netherlands) Hicham Faik | Jako | Ausnutria |
| Heracles Almelo | (Germany) Frank Wormuth | (Netherlands) Robin Pröpper | Acerbis | Asito |
| PEC Zwolle | (Netherlands) John Stegeman | (Netherlands) Bram van Polen | Craft | Molecaten |
| PSV Eindhoven | (Netherlands) Ernest Faber (ad int.) | (Netherlands) Ibrahim Afellay | Umbro | Metropoolregio Brainport Eindhoven |
| RKC Waalwijk | (Netherlands) Fred Grim | (Netherlands) Kevin Vermeulen | Stanno | Mandemakers Keukens |
| Sparta Rotterdam | (Netherlands) Henk Fraser | (Morocco) Adil Auassar | Robey | D&S Groep |
| Twente | (Spain) Gonzalo García García | (Netherlands) Wout Brama | Sondico | Pure Energie |
| Utrecht | (Netherlands) John van den Brom | (Netherlands) Willem Janssen | Nike | Zorg van de zaak |
| Vitesse | (Netherlands) Edward Sturing | (Netherlands) Bryan Linssen | Nike | Royal Burgers' Zoo & Netherlands Open Air Museum |
| VVV-Venlo | (Netherlands) Hans de Koning | (Netherlands) Danny Post | Masita | Seacon Logistics |
| Willem II | (Netherlands) Adrie Koster | (Netherlands) Jordens Peters | Robey | Destil |

=== Managerial changes ===
| Team | Outgoing manager | Manner of departure | Date of vacancy | Position in table | Replaced by | Date of appointment |
|---|---|---|---|---|---|---|
| Feyenoord | (Netherlands) Giovanni van Bronckhorst | End of contract | 1 July 2019 | Pre-season | (Netherlands) Jaap Stam | 1 June 2019 |
| AZ | (Netherlands) John van den Brom | End of contract | 1 July 2019 | Pre-season | (Netherlands) Arne Slot | 1 July 2019 |
| Utrecht | (Netherlands) Dick Advocaat | End of contract | 1 July 2019 | Pre-season | (Netherlands) John van den Brom | 1 July 2019 |
| Twente | (Bosnia and Herzegovina) Marino Pušić | Sacked | 1 July 2019 | Pre-season | (Spain) Gonzalo García García | 1 July 2019 |
| PEC Zwolle | (Netherlands) Jaap Stam | Signed by Feyenoord | 1 July 2019 | Pre-season | (Netherlands) John Stegeman | 1 July 2019 |
| Fortuna Sittard | (Netherlands) René Eijer | Mutual consent | 1 July 2019 | Pre-season | (Netherlands) Sjors Ultee | 1 July 2019 |
| VVV-Venlo | (Netherlands) Maurice Steijn | Signed by Al Wahda | 9 June 2019 | Pre-season | (Netherlands) Robert Maaskant | 1 July 2019 |
| Feyenoord | (Netherlands) Jaap Stam | Resigned | 28 October 2019 | 12th | (Netherlands) Dick Advocaat | 30 October 2019 |
| VVV-Venlo | (Netherlands) Robert Maaskant | Sacked | 11 November 2019 | 17th | (Netherlands) Jay Driessen (ad int.) | 15 November 2019 |
| Vitesse | (Russia) Leonid Slutsky | Resigned | 29 November 2019 | 6th | (Netherlands) Joseph Oosting (ad int.) | 3 December 2019 |
| ADO Den Haag | (Netherlands) Alfons Groenendijk | Resigned | 2 December 2019 | 17th | (Netherlands) Dirk Heesen (ad int.) | 2 December 2019 |
| PSV Eindhoven | (Netherlands) Mark van Bommel | Sacked | 16 December 2019 | 4th | (Netherlands) Ernest Faber (ad int.) | 16 December 2019 |
| VVV-Venlo | (Netherlands) Jay Driessen (ad int.) | End of interim spell | 19 December 2019 | 16th | (Netherlands) Hans de Koning | 19 December 2019 |
| ADO Den Haag | (Netherlands) Dirk Heesen (ad int.) | End of interim spell | 24 December 2019 | 17th | (England) Alan Pardew | 24 December 2019 |
| Vitesse | (Netherlands) Joseph Oosting (ad int.) | End of interim spell | 30 December 2019 | 6th | (Netherlands) Edward Sturing | 30 December 2019 |

== Standings ==
| Pos | Team | Pld | W | D | L | GF | GA | GD | Pts | Qualification or relegation |
|---|---|---|---|---|---|---|---|---|---|---|
| 1 | Ajax | 25 | 18 | 2 | 5 | 68 | 23 | +45 | 56 | Qualification for the Champions League group stage |
| 2 | AZ | 25 | 18 | 2 | 5 | 54 | 17 | +37 | 56 | Qualification for the Champions League second qualifying round |
| 3 | Feyenoord | 25 | 14 | 8 | 3 | 50 | 35 | +15 | 50 | Qualification for the Europa League group stage |
| 4 | PSV Eindhoven | 26 | 14 | 7 | 5 | 54 | 28 | +26 | 49 | Qualification for the Europa League third qualifying round |
| 5 | Willem II | 26 | 13 | 5 | 8 | 37 | 34 | +3 | 44 | Qualification for the Europa League second qualifying round |
| 6 | FC Utrecht | 25 | 12 | 5 | 8 | 50 | 34 | +16 | 41 | |
| 7 | Vitesse | 26 | 12 | 5 | 9 | 45 | 35 | +10 | 41 | |
| 8 | Heracles Almelo | 26 | 10 | 6 | 10 | 40 | 34 | +6 | 36 | |
| 9 | FC Groningen | 26 | 10 | 5 | 11 | 27 | 26 | +1 | 35 | |
| 10 | Heerenveen | 26 | 8 | 9 | 9 | 41 | 41 | 0 | 33 | |
| 11 | Sparta Rotterdam | 26 | 9 | 6 | 11 | 41 | 45 | −4 | 33 | |
| 12 | FC Emmen | 26 | 9 | 5 | 12 | 32 | 45 | −13 | 32 | |
| 13 | VVV-Venlo | 26 | 8 | 4 | 14 | 24 | 51 | −27 | 28 | |
| 14 | FC Twente | 26 | 7 | 6 | 13 | 34 | 46 | −12 | 27 | |
| 15 | PEC Zwolle | 26 | 7 | 5 | 14 | 37 | 55 | −18 | 26 | |
| 16 | Fortuna Sittard | 26 | 6 | 8 | 12 | 29 | 52 | −23 | 26 | |
| 17 | ADO Den Haag | 26 | 4 | 7 | 15 | 25 | 54 | −29 | 19 | |
| 18 | RKC Waalwijk | 26 | 4 | 3 | 19 | 27 | 60 | −33 | 15 | |

Source: eredivisie.nl
Rules for classification: Season in progress: 1) Most points won; 2) Less points lost; 3) Goal difference; 4) Goals scored; 5) Alphabetical order; End of season: 1) Points; 2) Goal difference; 3) Goals scored; 4) Head-to-head points; 5) Head-to-head goal difference; 6) Head-to-head away goals scored; 7) Play-off if relevant for deciding champion, relegation or participating in a European league, otherwise by draw. 8) Penalty shoot-out (only after a play-off)

== Fixtures/results ==
| Home \ Away | ADO | AJA | AZ | EMM | FEY | FOR | GRO | HEE | HER | PEC | PSV | RKC | SPA | TWE | UTR | VIT | VVV | WIL |
|---|---|---|---|---|---|---|---|---|---|---|---|---|---|---|---|---|---|---|
| ADO Den Haag | | 0–2 | 0–1 | | | | 1–1 | 1–1 | 0–0 | | 0–3 | 2–0 | 1–2 | 0–0 | 2–4 | 0–0 | 1–0 | 3–3 |
| Ajax | 6–1 | | 0–2 | 5–0 | 4–0 | 5–0 | 2–0 | 4–1 | 4–1 | | 1–0 | 3–0 | 2–1 | | 4–0 | | | 0–2 |
| AZ | 4–0 | 1–0 | | 3–0 | | 4–0 | 0–0 | 2–4 | 2–0 | 2–0 | | 4–0 | 5–1 | 3–0 | | | 1–0 | 1–3 |
| Emmen | 3–0 | | | | 3–3 | 2–1 | 0–1 | 2–0 | 1–0 | 1–3 | 1–1 | | 2–0 | 2–0 | | 2–1 | 3–0 | 4–2 |
| Feyenoord | 3–2 | | 0–3 | 3–0 | | 2–1 | | 3–1 | 1–1 | 1–0 | 3–1 | 3–2 | 2–2 | 5–1 | 1–1 | | | 2–0 |
| Fortuna Sittard | 1–0 | | | 0–0 | 4–2 | | 1–0 | 2–1 | 1–1 | 1–1 | | 3–2 | 0–0 | 2–3 | | 1–3 | 4–1 | 2–3 |
| Groningen | | 2–1 | | 2–0 | 1–1 | | | | 1–2 | 2–0 | 0–1 | 3–0 | 2–0 | 1–3 | 0–1 | 1–0 | 0–1 | 2–0 |
| Heerenveen | 2–2 | 1–3 | 1–2 | | 1–1 | 1–1 | 1–1 | | 1–1 | 1–0 | | | 2–1 | 0–0 | 1–1 | 3–2 | 1–1 | 1–2 |
| Heracles Almelo | 4–0 | 1–0 | | 2–0 | 2–3 | 2–0 | | 0–4 | | 4–0 | 0–2 | 4–2 | | | 1–3 | 1–1 | 6–1 | 4–1 |
| PEC Zwolle | 3–1 | 2–4 | 0–3 | | 3–4 | 3–1 | 1–0 | | | | 0–4 | 6–2 | 2–2 | | 3–3 | 4–3 | | 1–3 |
| PSV Eindhoven | 3–1 | 1–1 | 0–4 | | 1–1 | 5–0 | 3–1 | 2–1 | | 4–1 | | | | 1–1 | | 5–0 | 4–1 | 3–0 |
| RKC Waalwijk | 0–3 | 1–2 | 0–2 | 1–1 | | | | 1–3 | 2–0 | 0–0 | 1–3 | | 0–1 | 3–0 | 2–1 | 1–2 | 1–2 | |
| Sparta Rotterdam | 4–2 | 1–4 | 3–0 | 5–1 | | 1–1 | 1–2 | | 0–0 | | 2–2 | 4–0 | | 2–1 | 1–2 | 2–0 | 4–1 | |
| Twente | | 2–5 | 2–0 | 4–1 | | | 0–0 | 2–3 | 2–3 | 2–1 | 1–1 | 3–3 | 2–0 | | 3–1 | 0–3 | | 0–1 |
| Utrecht | 4–0 | | 0–3 | 3–1 | 1–2 | 6–0 | | | | 3–1 | 3–0 | 0–1 | 5–1 | 2–1 | | | 1–2 | 2–0 |
| Vitesse | 0–2 | 2–2 | 2–1 | 1–1 | 0–0 | 4–2 | 1–2 | 4–2 | | 3–0 | 1–2 | | | 1–0 | 2–1 | | 3–0 | |
| VVV-Venlo | | 1–4 | | 2–0 | 0–3 | 0–0 | 2–1 | 0–3 | 1–0 | 1–2 | 1–1 | 3–1 | | 2–1 | 1–1 | 0–4 | | |
| Willem II | | | 1–1 | 2–1 | 0–1 | 0–0 | 3–1 | | 1–0 | 0–0 | 2–1 | 2–1 | 4–0 | | 1–1 | 0–2 | 1–0 | |

Source: eredivisie.nl
Legend: Blue = home team win; Yellow = draw; Red = away team win.
For upcoming matches, an "a" indicates there is an article about the rivalry between the two participants.

=== Results by round ===
| Team ╲ Round | 1 | 2 | 3 | 4 | 5 | 6 | 7 | 8 | 9 | 10 | 11 | 12 | 13 | 14 | 15 | 16 | 17 | 18 | 19 | 20 | 21 | 22 | 23 | 24 | 25 | 26 | 27 | 28 | 29 | 30 | 31 | 32 | 33 | 34 |
|---|---|---|---|---|---|---|---|---|---|---|---|---|---|---|---|---|---|---|---|---|---|---|---|---|---|---|---|---|---|---|---|---|---|---|
| ADO Den Haag | L | L | L | W | W | L | L | L | L | L | W | D | L | D | L | D | D | L | W | L | D | L | L | D | D | L | – | – | – | – | – | – | – | – |
| Ajax | D | W | W | W | W | W | D | W | W | W | W | W | W | W | W | L | L | W | W | L | W | – | W | L | L | W | – | – | – | – | – | – | – | – |
| AZ | W | W | D | W | L | W | W | W | D | L | W | W | W | W | W | W | W | L | L | W | W | – | L | W | W | W | – | – | – | – | – | – | – | – |
| Emmen | L | L | W | L | L | L | D | W | L | W | L | W | L | D | D | L | W | L | W | D | L | W | D | W | L | W | – | – | – | – | – | – | – | – |
| Feyenoord | D | D | D | L | W | W | D | W | L | D | L | W | W | D | W | D | W | W | W | W | W | – | W | W | D | W | – | – | – | – | – | – | – | – |
| Fortuna Sittard | L | D | L | L | D | L | L | D | W | L | W | L | W | L | W | L | W | D | L | D | W | L | D | L | D | D | – | – | – | – | – | – | – | – |
| Groningen | W | L | D | L | L | L | W | L | W | W | D | W | W | D | L | L | D | W | D | W | L | W | W | L | L | L | – | – | – | – | – | – | – | – |
| Heerenveen | W | D | L | D | D | L | D | W | W | W | D | D | W | L | W | W | L | D | L | L | L | D | L | D | W | L | – | – | – | – | – | – | – | – |
| Heracles Almelo | L | D | L | D | W | W | W | L | W | D | W | L | W | L | W | D | L | D | L | L | L | W | L | W | D | W | – | – | – | – | – | – | – | – |
| PEC Zwolle | L | L | L | D | W | W | L | L | L | W | L | L | L | W | L | L | W | L | D | D | W | D | L | L | W | D | – | – | – | – | – | – | – | – |
| PSV Eindhoven | D | W | W | W | W | W | D | W | W | L | L | D | L | W | D | W | L | W | D | D | L | W | W | W | D | W | – | – | – | – | – | – | – | – |
| RKC Waalwijk | L | L | D | L | L | L | L | L | L | L | L | W | L | D | W | L | L | W | L | L | L | D | L | L | W | L | – | – | – | – | – | – | – | – |
| Sparta Rotterdam | D | W | W | D | L | L | W | D | W | L | L | D | L | W | L | D | L | W | L | D | L | W | L | W | W | L | – | – | – | – | – | – | – | – |
| Twente | D | W | D | D | W | W | L | L | L | L | W | L | W | L | L | D | L | L | D | D | W | L | W | L | L | L | – | – | – | – | – | – | – | – |
| Utrecht | W | W | D | L | L | W | D | W | L | W | W | W | L | L | L | W | W | L | D | W | D | – | D | W | L | W | – | – | – | – | – | – | – | – |
| Vitesse | D | W | W | D | W | L | W | W | W | W | L | L | L | L | L | D | W | W | W | D | D | L | W | L | L | W | – | – | – | – | – | – | – | – |
| VVV-Venlo | W | L | L | W | L | W | L | L | L | L | L | L | L | W | L | W | L | L | D | W | D | D | W | W | D | L | – | – | – | – | – | – | – | – |
| Willem II | W | L | W | W | L | L | W | L | D | W | W | L | W | D | W | W | W | D | W | D | W | L | D | L | W | L | – | – | – | – | – | – | – | – |

Source: worldfootball.net

== Season statistics ==
=== Top scorers ===
| Rank | Player | Club | Games | Goals | Penalties | Avg. |
|---|---|---|---|---|---|---|
| 1 | (Netherlands) Steven Berghuis | Feyenoord | 24 | 15 | 7 | 0.63 |
| 1 | (Nigeria) Cyriel Dessers | Heracles Almelo | 26 | 15 | 1 | 0.58 |
| 3 | (Netherlands) Myron Boadu | AZ | 24 | 14 | 0 | 0.58 |
| 3 | (Netherlands) Bryan Linssen | Vitesse | 25 | 14 | 0 | 0.56 |
| 5 | (Morocco) Oussama Idrissi | AZ | 25 | 13 | 0 | 0.52 |
| 6 | (Netherlands) Quincy Promes | Ajax | 20 | 12 | 0 | 0.6 |
| 6 | (Slovenia) Tim Matavž | Vitesse | 25 | 12 | 1 | 0.48 |
| 8 | (Netherlands) Donyell Malen | PSV Eindhoven | 14 | 11 | 2 | 0.79 |
| 8 | (Greece) Vangelis Pavlidis | Willem II | 25 | 11 | 1 | 0.44 |
| 8 | (Slovenia) Haris Vučkić | Twente | 25 | 11 | 1 | 0.44 |
| 8 | (Serbia) Dušan Tadić | Ajax | 25 | 11 | 3 | 0.44 |
| 8 | (Netherlands) Teun Koopmeiners | AZ | 25 | 11 | 9 | 0.44 |

Source: nos.nl

=== Hat-tricks ===
| Rnd | Player | Club | Goals | Date | Home | Score | Away |
|---|---|---|---|---|---|---|---|
| 4 | (Netherlands) Quincy Promes | Ajax | 50', 68', 83' | 25 September 2019 | Ajax | 5–0 | Fortuna Sittard |
| 6 | (Netherlands) Donyell Malen | PSV Eindhoven | 18', 36', 46', 83' (p), 89' (p) | 14 September 2019 | PSV Eindhoven | 5–0 | Vitesse |
| 6 | (Iran) Reza Ghoochannejhad | PEC Zwolle | 60', 81', 83', 88' | 15 September 2019 | PEC Zwolle | 6–2 | RKC Waalwijk |
| 11 | (Netherlands) Mark Diemers | Fortuna Sittard | 9', 26', 87' (p) | 26 October 2019 | Fortuna Sittard | 4–1 | VVV-Venlo |
| 13 | (Nigeria) Cyriel Dessers | Heracles Almelo | 56', 64', 82' | 9 November 2019 | Heracles Almelo | 6–1 | VVV-Venlo |
| 15 | (Netherlands) Noa Lang | Ajax | 32', 51', 70' | 1 December 2019 | Twente | 2–5 | Ajax |
| 17 | (Netherlands) Steven Berghuis | Feyenoord | 19', 34' (p), 64' (p) | 15 December 2019 | Feyenoord | 3–1 | PSV Eindhoven |

=== Assists ===
| Rank | Player | Club | Games | Assists | Avg. |
|---|---|---|---|---|---|
| 1 | (Serbia) Dušan Tadić | Ajax | 25 | 14 | 0.56 |
| 2 | (Morocco) Hakim Ziyech | Ajax | 21 | 12 | 0.57 |
| 3 | (Netherlands) Steven Bergwijn | PSV Eindhoven | 16 | 10 | 0.63 |
| 4 | (Netherlands) Abdou Harroui | Sparta Rotterdam | 26 | 8 | 0.31 |
| 5 | (Netherlands) Steven Berghuis | Feyenoord | 24 | 7 | 0.29 |
| 5 | (Netherlands) Gyrano Kerk | Utrecht | 24 | 7 | 0.29 |
| 5 | (Netherlands) Calvin Stengs | AZ | 25 | 7 | 0.28 |
| 5 | (Brazil) Mauro Júnior | Heracles Almelo | 26 | 7 | 0.27 |
| 9 | (Netherlands) Bryan Smeets | Sparta Rotterdam | 22 | 6 | 0.27 |
| 9 | (Netherlands) Myron Boadu | AZ | 24 | 6 | 0.25 |
| 9 | (Netherlands) Owen Wijndal | AZ | 24 | 6 | 0.25 |
| 9 | (Netherlands) Cody Gakpo | PSV Eindhoven | 25 | 6 | 0.24 |
| 9 | (Netherlands) Gustavo Hamer | PEC Zwolle | 25 | 6 | 0.24 |
| 9 | (Nigeria) Cyriel Dessers | Heracles Almelo | 26 | 6 | 0.23 |

Source: nos.nl

=== Attendance ===
| Home ╲ Away | ADO | AJA | AZ | EMM | FEY | FOR | GRO | HEE | HER | PEC | PSV | RKC | SPA | TWE | UTR | VIT | VVV | WIL | Tot | Avg | Max | Min |
|---|---|---|---|---|---|---|---|---|---|---|---|---|---|---|---|---|---|---|---|---|---|---|
| ADO Den Haag | | 14,733 | 12,091 | | | | 11,049 | 12,681 | 11,207 | | 13,370 | 12,433 | 12,479 | 11,439 | 10,633 | 12,387 | 10,617 | 10,889 | 156,008 | 12,001 | 14,733 | 10,617 |
| Ajax | 53,976 | | 52,707 | 53,124 | 53,968 | 53,121 | 53,228 | 52,921 | 53,226 | | 53,055 | 53,291 | 53,426 | | 53,381 | | | 54,022 | 693,446 | 53,342 | 54,022 | 52,707 |
| AZ | 16,117 | 17,002 | | 5,565 | | 12,858 | 8,563 | 7,648 | 7,241 | 15,306 | | 14,712 | 8,327 | 7,597 | | | 6,007 | 15,442 | 142,385 | 10,953 | 17,002 | 5,565 |
| Emmen | 8,002 | | | | 8,309 | 8,130 | 8,245 | 8,145 | 8,176 | 8,293 | 8,309 | | 8,145 | 8,309 | | 8,048 | 8,100 | 8,190 | 106,401 | 8,185 | 8,309 | 8,002 |
| Feyenoord | 45,496 | | 42,866 | 47,084 | | 46,016 | | 46,000 | 44,303 | 44,513 | 47,625 | 47,431 | 45,585 | 42,866 | 44,352 | | | 47,500 | 591,637 | 45,511 | 47,625 | 42,866 |
| Fortuna Sittard | 8,223 | | | 7,856 | 8,511 | | 7,632 | 8,371 | 5,866 | 10,071 | | 8,391 | 7,483 | 7,377 | | 8,238 | 8,388 | 7,273 | 103,680 | 7,975 | 10,071 | 5,866 |
| Groningen | | 22,315 | | 20,136 | 21,096 | | | | 15,934 | 16,471 | 19,116 | 16,029 | 17,582 | 19,049 | 18,741 | 17,884 | 16,374 | 16,590 | 237,317 | 18,255 | 22,315 | 15,934 |
| Heerenveen | 16,640 | 25,950 | 19,638 | | 18,600 | 15,128 | 22,428 | | 20,424 | 16,632 | | | 18,089 | 16,328 | 16,593 | 17,883 | 16,400 | 18,121 | 258,854 | 18,490 | 25,950 | 15,128 |
| Heracles Almelo | 10,150 | 12,080 | | 10,376 | 10,686 | 10,235 | | 9,640 | | 10,157 | 10,063 | 10,412 | | | 10,200 | 9,344 | 9,400 | 11,254 | 133,997 | 10,307 | 12,080 | 9,344 |
| PEC Zwolle | 12,943 | 14,000 | 13,708 | | 13,822 | 13,912 | 12,844 | | | | 13,482 | 13,028 | 12,532 | | 13,102 | 13,088 | | 13,824 | 160,285 | 13,357 | 14,000 | 12,532 |
| PSV Eindhoven | 32,000 | 35,000 | 34,000 | | 35,000 | 33,300 | 32,800 | 33,800 | | 33,000 | | | | 33,600 | | 33,300 | 33,000 | 34,700 | 403,500 | 33,625 | 35,000 | 32,000 |
| RKC Waalwijk | 5,034 | 7,508 | 6,023 | 6,645 | | | | 5,174 | 4,689 | 5,257 | 7,035 | | 5,343 | 5,154 | 5,134 | 4,858 | 6,103 | | 73,957 | 5,689 | 7,508 | 4,689 |
| Sparta Rotterdam | 8,083 | 10,599 | 10,031 | 10,060 | | 9,821 | 10,143 | | 9,934 | | 10,387 | 10,231 | | 10,435 | 10,322 | 10,020 | 10,012 | | 130,078 | 10,006 | 10,599 | 8,083 |
| Twente | | 30,000 | 27,300 | 27,400 | | | 26,500 | 27,000 | 29,300 | 26,900 | 27,200 | 25,700 | 26,300 | | 25,500 | 26,500 | | 27,500 | 353,100 | 27,162 | 30,000 | 25,500 |
| Utrecht | 17,319 | | 22,401 | 17,661 | 21,103 | 18,776 | | | | 18,736 | 22,632 | 18,103 | 20,624 | 18,491 | | | 17,986 | 19,419 | 233,251 | 19,438 | 22,632 | 17,319 |
| Vitesse | 12,663 | 18,100 | 13,290 | 13,265 | 16,455 | 20,800 | 12,590 | 14,113 | | 12,273 | 15,509 | | | 14,210 | 12,704 | | 13,454 | | 189,426 | 14,571 | 20,800 | 12,273 |
| VVV-Venlo | | 8,000 | | 6,580 | 6,572 | 7,115 | 6,265 | 5,944 | 6,594 | 6,861 | 7,059 | 5,560 | | 6,730 | 6,265 | 5,992 | | | 85,537 | 6,580 | 8,000 | 5,560 |
| Willem II | | | 12,707 | 13,300 | 13,875 | 13,587 | 13,607 | | 13,417 | 13,337 | 14,400 | 13,877 | 14,250 | | 14,107 | 12,825 | 13,227 | | 176,516 | 13,578 | 14,400 | 12,707 |
| Total | 246,646 | 215,287 | 266,762 | 239,052 | 227,997 | 262,799 | 225,894 | 231,437 | 230,311 | 237,807 | 269,242 | 249,198 | 250,165 | 201,585 | 241,034 | 180,367 | 169,068 | 284,724 | 4,229,375 | | | |
| Average | 18,973 | 17,941 | 22,230 | 18,389 | 19,000 | 20,215 | 17,376 | 19,286 | 17,716 | 16,986 | 19,232 | 19,169 | 19,243 | 15,507 | 18,541 | 13,874 | 13,005 | 21,902 | | 18,230 | | |
| Maximum | 53,976 | 35,000 | 52,707 | 53,124 | 53,968 | 53,121 | 53,228 | 52,921 | 53,226 | 44,513 | 53,055 | 53,291 | 53,426 | 42,866 | 53,381 | 33,300 | 33,000 | 54,022 | | | 54,022 | |
| Minimum | 5,034 | 7,508 | 6,023 | 5,565 | 6,572 | 7,115 | 6,265 | 5,174 | 4,689 | 5,257 | 7,035 | 5,560 | 5,343 | 5,154 | 5,134 | 4,858 | 6,007 | 7,273 | | | | 4,689 |

Source: nos.nl

== Awards ==
=== Monthly awards ===
| Month | Player of the Month | | Talent of the Month | | Ref. |
| Month | Player | Club | Player | Club | Ref. |
|---|---|---|---|---|---|
| August | (Morocco) Hakim Ziyech | Ajax | (Netherlands) Owen Wijndal | AZ | |
| September | (Netherlands) Donyell Malen | PSV | (Nigeria) Chidera Ejuke | Heerenveen | |
| October | (Netherlands) Adam Maher | Utrecht | (Germany) Lennart Czyborra | Heracles | |
| November | (Nigeria) Cyriel Dessers | Heracles Almelo | (Netherlands) Owen Wijndal | AZ | |
| December | (Morocco) Oussama Idrissi | AZ | (Turkey) Orkun Kökçü | Feyenoord | |
| January | (Morocco) Oussama Idrissi | AZ | (Colombia) Luis Sinisterra | Feyenoord | |
| February | (Germany) Thorsten Kirschbaum | VVV-Venlo | (Netherlands) Joey Veerman | Heerenveen | |

Team of the Season
| Goalkeeper | (Netherlands) Marco Bizot (AZ Alkmaar) | | | |
| Defenders | (Netherlands) Denzel Dumfries (PSV Eindhoven) | | (Netherlands) Daley Blind (Ajax) | (Argentina) Nicolás Tagliafico (Ajax) |
| Midfielders | (Netherlands) Donny van de Beek (Ajax) | (Netherlands) Teun Koopmeiners (AZ Alkmaar) | (Norway) Fredrik Midtsjø (AZ Alkmaar) | (Morocco) Hakim Ziyech (Ajax) |
| Forwards | (Netherlands) Quincy Promes (Ajax) | | (Morocco) Oussama Idrissi (AZ Alkmaar) | (Belgium) Cyriel Dessers (Heracles Almelo) |
