= Bryan Smeets =

Dutch footballer (born 1992)

Personal information
- Full name: Bryan George Jeffrey Smeets
- Date of birth: 22 November 1992 (age 33)
- Place of birth: Maastricht, Netherlands
- Height: 1.83 m (6 ft 0 in)
- Position: Midfielder

Team information
- Current team: Lierse
- Number: 5

Youth career
- MVV

Senior career*
Years	Team	Apps	(Gls)
2010–2015	MVV	144	(23)
2015–2017	De Graafschap	52	(4)
2017–2018	Cambuur	7	(0)
2018–2019	TOP Oss	37	(12)
2019–2022	Sparta Rotterdam	68	(10)
2022	Lommel	10	(1)
2022–2023	RWD Molenbeek	14	(0)
2023–2026	MVV	67	(16)
2026–	Lierse	4	(0)
- * Club domestic league appearances and goals as of 11 September 2026

Bryan George Jeffrey Smeets (born 22 November 1992) is a Dutch professional footballer who plays as a midfielder for Challenger Pro League club Lierse in Belgium.

== Club career ==
He formerly played for MVV Maastricht, De Graafschap and SC Cambuur. He is best known the myth of Bryan scoring the equalizer against Ajax in 2016, which dramatically decided the winner of the Eredivisie title to be PSV Eindhoven.

On 1 February 2022, Smeets signed with Lommel in Belgium.

Only months later, on 18 May 2022, Smeets was announced as the first signing ahead of the 2022–23 season for RWDM. He signed a two-year deal with an option for an additional year. In December 2022, he was told by club management that he was unwanted and could leave. In April 2023, he started practicing with his former club De Graafschap.

Smeets returned to MVV Maastricht in June 2023, signing a three-year contract through 30 June 2026. Local media described him during the 2024–25 season as him as MVV's playmaker and "architect" in midfield

Ahead of the 2025–26 season, Smeets requested a transfer, and MVV confirmed that he had been excused from first-team duties while he sought a move. When no deal materialised, he was demoted to the under-21 squad, and in September 2025, it was announced that he would remain outside the senior squad at least until the winter break.

== International career ==
He was part of the Netherlands squad at the 2009 FIFA U-17 World Cup.

== Career statistics ==
As of match played 9 May 2025

Appearances and goals by club, season and competition
Club	Season	League			National cup (Note: Includes KNVB Cup, Belgian Cup)		Other		Total	
Club	Season	Division	Apps	Goals	Apps	Goals	Apps	Goals	Apps	Goals
MVV	2009–10	Eerste Divisie	4	0	0	0	—		4	0
MVV	2010–11	Eerste Divisie	13	1	0	0	2 (Note: Appearances in Eredivisie promotion/relegation playoffs)	0	15	1
MVV	2011–12	Eerste Divisie	24	3	2	1	2	0	28	4
MVV	2012–13	Eerste Divisie	32	8	1	1	2	0	35	10
MVV	2013–14	Eerste Divisie	36	5	2	0	—		38	5
MVV	2014–15	Eerste Divisie	35	6	2	0	—		37	6
MVV	Total		144	23	7	2	6	0	157	25
De Graafschap	2015–16	Eredivisie	28	1	1	0	4	1	33	2
De Graafschap	2016–17	Eerste Divisie	24	3	1	0	—		25	3
De Graafschap	Total		52	4	2	0	4	1	58	5
Cambuur	2017–18	Eerste Divisie	7	0	3	0	—		10	0
TOP Oss	2018–19	Eerste Divisie	37	12	2	0	2	0	41	12
Sparta Rotterdam	2019–20 (Note: Season curtailed due to COVID-19 pandemic in the Netherlands)	Eredivisie	22	4	1	0	—		23	4
Sparta Rotterdam	2020–21	Eredivisie	26	4	0	0	1 (Note: Appearance(s) in Eredivisie European play-offs)	0	27	4
Sparta Rotterdam	2021–22	Eerste Divisie	20	2	2	0	—		22	2
Sparta Rotterdam	Total		68	10	3	0	1	0	72	10
Lommel	2021–22	First Division B	10	1	—		—		10	1
RWD Molenbeek	2022–23	Challenger Pro League	14	0	1	0	—		15	0
MVV	2023–24	Eerste Divisie	33	10	1	0	—		34	10
MVV	2024–25	Eerste Divisie	34	5	2	0	—		36	5
MVV	Total		67	15	3	0	—		70	15
Career total			399	65	20	2	13	1	433	68
