= 2017–18 AFC Ajax season =

Dutch football club season

Ajax
2017–18 season
- Owner: AFC Ajax N.V.
- CEO: Edwin van der Sar
- Manager: Marcel Keizer (until 21 December 2017); Erik ten Hag (from 1 January 2018)
- Stadium: Amsterdam Arena
- Eredivisie: 2nd
- KNVB Cup: Round of 16
- Champions League: Third qualifying round
- Europa League: Play-off round
- Top goalscorer: League: David Neres (14); All: David Neres (14)
- Highest home attendance: 53,320 vs Feyenoord (21 January 2018)
- Lowest home attendance: 30,295 vs VVV-Venlo (19 April 2018)
- Average home league attendance: 49,711
Home colours	Away colours

During the 2017–18 season, Ajax participated in the Eredivisie and the KNVB Cup. They also participated in the UEFA Champions League and the UEFA Europa League but could not get past the qualification stage for either competitions. This marked the first time that Ajax did not qualify for the group stage of a UEFA club competition since the 1990–91 season, when they were excluded from competing in European football for a year due to the staafincident. The squad's first training took place on 29 June 2017.

== Player statistics ==
Appearances for competitive matches only

No.	Pos	Nat	Player	Total		Eredivisie		UEFA Champions League UEFA Europa League		KNVB Cup	
No.	Pos	Nat	Player	Apps	Goals	Apps	Goals	Apps	Goals	Apps	Goals
1	GK	(Cameroon) CMR	André Onana	38	0	33	0	4	0	1	0
3	DF	(Netherlands) NED	Joël Veltman	36	1	28+2	1	4	0	2	0
4	DF	(Netherlands) NED	Matthijs de Ligt	39	3	33	3	4	0	2	0
5	DF	(Austria) AUT	Maximilian Wöber	23	1	16+6	1	0	0	1	0
6	MF	(Netherlands) NED	Donny van de Beek	39	13	33+1	11	4	2	1	0
7	FW	(Brazil) BRA	David Neres	37	14	28+4	14	1+2	0	2	0
8	MF	(Netherlands) NED	Daley Sinkgraven	5	0	1+3	0	0	0	1	0
9	FW	(Netherlands) NED	Klaas-Jan Huntelaar	32	13	24+4	13	0+3	0	0+1	0
10	MF	(Morocco) MAR	Hakim Ziyech	39	9	34	9	4	0	1	0
11	FW	(Germany) GER	Amin Younes	17	2	9+4	1	4	1	0	0
15	DF	(Netherlands) NED	Carel Eiting	6	0	1+3	0	0	0	2	0
17	MF	(Czech Republic) CZE	Václav Černý	7	1	2+2	0	0+1	0	2	1
18	FW	(Norway) NOR	Dennis Johnsen	4	0	0+2	0	0	0	0+2	0
19	FW	(Colombia) COL	Mateo Cassierra	5	1	0+4	1	0	0	0+1	0
20	FW	(Denmark) DEN	Lasse Schöne	36	11	27+3	10	4	1	2	0
21	MF	(Netherlands) NED	Frenkie de Jong	26	1	16+6	0	0+2	0	2	1
22	GK	(Netherlands) NED	Benjamin van Leer	1	0	0	0	0	0	1	0
23	MF	(Netherlands) NED	Siem de Jong	26	7	4+19	4	0	0	2+1	3
25	FW	(Denmark) DEN	Kasper Dolberg	30	9	11+12	6	4	0	3	3
26	DF	(Netherlands) NED	Nick Viergever	18	2	12	2	4	0	2	0
28	MF	(Colombia) COL	Luis Manuel Orejuela	4	0	0+1	0	0	0	2+1	0
30	GK	(Netherlands) NED	Norbert Alblas	0	0	0	0	0	0	0	0
31	DF	(Argentina) ARG	Nicolás Tagliafico	15	1	15	1	0	0	0	0
33	GK	(Greece) GRE	Kostas Lamprou	2	0	1	0	0	0	1	0
34	MF	(Netherlands) NED	Abdelhak Nouri	0	0	0	0	0	0	0	0
35	DF	(Netherlands) NED	Mitchell Dijks	12	0	8+1	0	2	0	1	0
36	MF	(Netherlands) NED	Dani de Wit	1	0	0+1	0	0	0	0	0
40	DF	(Netherlands) NED	Noussair Mazraoui	8	0	3+5	0	0	0	0	0
41	MF	(Netherlands) NED	Azor Matusiwa	1	0	1	0	0	0	0	0
43	DF	(Denmark) DEN	Rasmus Nissen	8	0	5+3	0	0	0	0	0
45	FW	(Netherlands) NED	Justin Kluivert	36	11	27+3	10	3+1	0	2	1
47	MF	(Netherlands) NED	Jurgen Ekkelenkamp	3	0	0+3	0	0	0	0	0
Players sold or loaned out after the start of the season:
5	DF	(Colombia) COL	Davinson Sánchez	2	1	0	0	2	1	0	0
42	DF	(Netherlands) NED	Deyovaisio Zeefuik	9	0	2+3	0	0+2	0	0+2	0

As of 6 May 2018

== Team statistics ==
=== Eredivisie standings 2017–18 ===
Current standing	Matches played	Wins	Draws	Losses	Points	Goals for	Goals against	Yellow cards (yellow card)	Red cards (red card)
2	34	25	4	5	79	89	33	58	3

Match day	1	2	3	4	5	6	7	8	9	10	11	12	13	14	15	16	17	18	19	20	21	22	23	24	25	26	27	28	29	30	31	32	33	34	Total
Points by match day	0	3	3	3	1	0	3	3	3	3	0	3	3	1	3	3	3	3	3	1	3	3	3	3	1	0	3	3	3	3	0	3	3	3	79
Total points by match day	0	3	6	9	10	10	13	16	19	22	22	25	28	29	32	35	38	41	44	45	48	51	54	57	58	58	61	64	67	70	70	73	76	79	79
Standing by match day	12	8	6	3	6	7	6	2	2	2	2	2	2	3	3	2	2	2	2	2	2	2	2	2	2	2	2	2	2	2	2	2	2	2	2
Goals by match day	1	3	2	3	1	1	4	4	4	3	1	8	5	3	3	3	2	3	2	0	3	4	2	1	0	2	4	5	2	1	0	4	3	2	89
Goals against per match day	2	1	0	0	1	2	0	0	1	1	2	0	1	3	0	1	1	1	0	0	1	2	1	0	0	3	1	2	1	0	3	1	0	1	33
Total goal difference per match day	−1	+1	+3	+6	+6	+5	+9	+13	+16	+18	+17	+25	+29	+29	+32	+34	+35	+37	+39	+39	+41	+43	+44	+45	+45	+44	+47	+50	+51	+52	+49	+52	+55	+56	+56

==== Topscorers ====
Eredivisie

Nr.	Name	Goal
1.	(Brazil) David Neres	14
2.	(Netherlands) Klaas-Jan Huntelaar	13
3.	(Netherlands) Donny van de Beek	11
4.	(Netherlands) Justin Kluivert	10
4.	(Denmark) Lasse Schöne	10
6.	(Morocco) Hakim Ziyech	9
7.	(Denmark) Kasper Dolberg	6
8.	(Netherlands) Siem de Jong	4
9.	(Netherlands) Matthijs de Ligt	3
10.	(Netherlands) Nick Viergever	2
11.	(Colombia) Mateo Cassierra	1
11.	(Argentina) Nicolás Tagliafico	1
11.	(Netherlands) Joël Veltman	1
11.	(Austria) Maximilian Wöber	1
11.	(Germany) Amin Younes	1
Own goal	(Netherlands) Sherel Floranus (Sparta Rotterdam)	1
Own goal	(Belgium) Ryan Sanusi (Sparta Rotterdam)	1
	Total	89

KNVB Cup

Nr.	Name	Goal
1.	(Denmark) Kasper Dolberg	3
1.	(Netherlands) Siem de Jong	3
3.	(Czech Republic) Václav Černý	1
3.	(Netherlands) Frenkie de Jong	1
3.	(Netherlands) Justin Kluivert	1
Own goal	(Netherlands) Ruben Koorndijk (Scheveningen)	1
	Total	10

UEFA Champions League

Nr.	Name	Goal
1.	(Netherlands) Donny van de Beek	2
2.	(Colombia) Davinson Sánchez	1
	Total	3

UEFA Europa League

Nr.	Name	Goal
1.	(Denmark) Lasse Schöne	1
1.	(Germany) Amin Younes	1
	Total	2

== Competitions ==
All times are in CEST

=== Eredivisie ===
==== League table ====
Pos	Team	Pld	W	D	L	GF	GA	GD	Pts	Qualification or relegation
1	PSV Eindhoven (C)	34	26	5	3	87	39	+48	83	Qualification to Champions League play-off round
2	Ajax	34	25	4	5	89	33	+56	79	Qualification to Champions League second qualifying round
3	AZ	34	22	5	7	72	38	+34	71	Qualification to Europa League second qualifying round
4	Feyenoord	34	20	6	8	76	39	+37	66	Qualification to Europa League third qualifying round (Note: Feyenoord qualified for the Europa League third qualifying round by winning the 2017–18 KNVB Cup.)
5	Utrecht	34	14	12	8	58	53	+5	54	Qualification to European competition play-offs (Note: Four teams play for a spot in the 2018–19 UEFA Europa League second qualifying round.)

Source: eredivisie.nl
Rules for classification: 1) Points; 2) Goal difference; 3) Goals scored; 4) Head-to-head points; 5) Head-to-head goal difference; 6) Head-to-head away goals scored; 7) Play-off if relevant for deciding champion, relegation or participating in a European league, otherwise by draw. 8) Penalty shoot-out (only after a play-off)
(C) Champions

==== Matches ====
12 August 2017 1	Heracles Almelo	2−1	Ajax	Almelo
20:45 CEST	Niemeijer (yellow card) 16'; Gladon 65'; Kuwas 82'	Report	De Ligt (yellow card) 31'; Ziyech 56'	Stadium: Polman Stadion; Attendance: 12,080; Referee: Kevin Blom

20 August 2017 2	Ajax	3–1	Groningen	Amsterdam
14:30 CEST	Huntelaar 38'; Ziyech 48'; Schöne 79'	Report	Te Wierik (yellow card) 5'; Van Weert (yellow card) 60'; Idrissi 73'	Stadium: Johan Cruyff Arena; Attendance: 51,152; Referee: Dennis Higler

27 August 2017 3	VVV-Venlo	0–2	Ajax	Venlo
14:30 CEST	Seuntjens (yellow card) 45+1'; Leemans (yellow card) 64'	Report	De Ligt (yellow card) 17'; Van de Beek 55'; Neres 70'	Stadium: De Koel; Attendance: 8,000; Referee: Björn Kuipers

9 September 2017 4	Ajax	3–0	PEC Zwolle	Amsterdam
20:45 CEST	Huntelaar 6', 88'; Ziyech (penalty missed) 66', 71'; Veltman (yellow card) 72'; Van de Beek (yellow card) 76'	Report	Bakker (yellow card) 90'	Stadium: Johan Cruyff Arena; Attendance: 50,902; Referee: Serdar Gözübüyük

17 September 2017 5	ADO Den Haag	1−1	Ajax	The Hague
14:30 CEST	Immers (yellow card) 34'; Beugelsdijk (yellow card) 38'; Johnsen 71'; Becker (yellow card) 87'	Report	Kluivert (yellow card) 2'; Veltman 28', (yellow card) 57'; Van de Beek (yellow card) 60'; Schöne (yellow card) 87'	Stadium: Cars Jeans Stadion; Attendance: 12,016; Referee: Bas Nijhuis

24 September 2017 6	Ajax	1−2	Vitesse	Amsterdam
14:30 CEST	Van de Beek (yellow card) 21'; Viergever 83'; Huntelaar (yellow card) 90+2'	Report	Kashia 21'; Rashica 45+3'; Faye (yellow card) 79'; Bruns (yellow card) 80'; Castaignos (yellow card) 90+2'	Stadium: Johan Cruyff Arena; Attendance: 51,236; Referee: Pol van Boekel

1 October 2017 7	Heerenveen	0−4	Ajax	Heerenveen
14:30 CEST	Pierie (yellow card) 14'; Høegh (yellow card) 42'; Thorsby (yellow card) 50'; Woudenberg (yellow card) 74'; Mihajlović (yellow card) 90'	Report	Veltman (yellow card) 24'; De Ligt (yellow card) 34'; Neres 38', 41'; Schöne (yellow card) 58', (goal) 75' (pen.); Wöber 83'	Stadium: Abe Lenstra Stadion; Attendance: 25,600; Referee: Serdar Gözübüyük

14 October 2017 8	Ajax	4−0	Sparta Rotterdam	Amsterdam
18:30 CEST	Sanusi 39' (o.g.); Floranus 64' (o.g.); Neres 73'; Younes 76'; Viergever (yellow card) 81'; Dolberg (penalty missed) 90+2'	Report	Fischer (yellow card) 41'	Stadium: Johan Cruyff Arena; Attendance: 51,567; Referee: Kevin Blom

22 October 2017 9	Feyenoord	1−4	Ajax	Rotterdam
14:30 CEST	Jørgensen (yellow card) 24', (penalty missed) 56'; Vilhena (yellow card) 26'; Toornstra 58'	Report	Huntelaar (yellow card) 20', (goal) 50'; Ziyech (yellow card) 41'; Schöne (yellow card) 60'; Neres (yellow card) 64'; Dolberg 72', 90'; S. de Jong 89'	Stadium: De Kuip; Attendance: 47,500; Referee: Danny Makkelie

28 October 2017 10	Willem II	1−3	Ajax	Tilburg
20:45 CET	Chirivella (yellow card) 50'; Velikonja 55'; Rienstra (yellow card) 74'	Report	De Ligt (yellow card) 32'; Schöne 70'; S. de Jong 79'; Neres 90+1'	Stadium: Koning Willem II Stadion; Attendance: 13,907; Referee: Dennis Higler

5 November 2017 11	Ajax	1−2	Utrecht	Amsterdam
14:30 CET	Schöne (yellow card) 36'; Viergever 41', (yellow card) 71'	Report	Labyad 6', 84', (yellow card) 29'; Janssen (yellow card) 19'; Klaiber (yellow card) 84'	Stadium: Johan Cruyff Arena; Attendance: 51,758; Referee: Björn Kuipers

18 November 2017 12	NAC Breda	0−8	Ajax	Breda
20:45 CET	Angeliño (yellow card) 32'	Report	De Ligt 13', 33'; Van de Beek 18', 26', 75'; Neres 29'; Schöne 66' (pen.); Huntelaar 73'	Stadium: Rat Verlegh Stadion; Attendance: 18,969; Referee: Danny Makkelie

26 November 2017 13	Ajax	5−1	Roda JC Kerkrade	Amsterdam
12:30 CET	Kluivert 45', 60', 85'; Dolberg 59'; Van de Beek 75'	Report	Kum 32'; Engels (yellow card) 61'	Stadium: Johan Cruyff Arena; Attendance: 51,685; Referee: Bas Nijhuis

2 December 2017 14	Twente	3−3	Ajax	Enschede
18:30 CET	Thesker (yellow card) 32', (goal) 48', 63'; Hooiveld (yellow card) 36'; Boere (yellow card) 52', (goal) 89'; Cuevas (yellow card) 66'	Report	Schöne 33', 37'; Neres (yellow card) 48'; F. de Jong (yellow card) 56'; Kluivert 79'; Veltman (yellow card) 87'	Stadium: De Grolsch Veste; Attendance: 27,500; Referee: Dennis Higler

10 December 2017 15	Ajax	3−0	PSV	Amsterdam
16:45 CET	Schöne (yellow card) 27', (goal) 64'; Neres 61'; Wöber (yellow card) 62'; Van de Beek 72'; Zeefuik (yellow card) 90+2'	Report	Hendrix (yellow card) 27'; Brenet (yellow card) 34'; Lozano (yellow card) 40'; Van Ginkel (yellow card) 59'	Stadium: Johan Cruyff Arena; Attendance: 52,379; Referee: Kevin Blom

14 December 2017 16	Ajax	3−1	Excelsior	Amsterdam
20:45 CET	S. de Jong 23'; Veltman (yellow card) 39'; Dolberg 57' (pen.); Ziyech 86'	Report	Koolwijk (yellow card) 6'; Van Duinen 40', (yellow card) 85'; Fortes (yellow card) 45+3'; Faik (yellow card) 56'; De Wijs (yellow card) 59'	Stadium: Johan Cruyff Arena; Attendance: 51,695; Referee: Ed Janssen

17 December 2017 17	AZ	1−2	Ajax	Alkmaar
14:30 CET	Jahanbakhsh 25' (pen.); Svensson (yellow card) 26' (yellow-red card) 86'; Hatzidiakos (yellow card) 50'	Report	Zeefuik (yellow card) 25'; Huntelaar 43'; Schöne 51' (pen.); F. de Jong (yellow card) 88'	Stadium: AFAS Stadion; Attendance: 17,000; Referee: Danny Makkelie

24 December 2017 18	Ajax	3−1	Willem II	Amsterdam
14:30 CET	Kluivert 63'; Dolberg 72'; Schöne (yellow card) 76'; Neres 81'	Report	Crowley (yellow card) 48'; Sol 53', (yellow card) 70'	Stadium: Johan Cruyff Arena; Attendance: 51,921; Referee: Jeroen Manschot

21 January 2018 19	Ajax	2−0	Feyenoord	Amsterdam
14:30 CET	Kluivert (yellow card) 23'; Van de Beek 50'; Huntelaar 53'	Report	St. Juste (yellow card) 22'; Jørgensen (yellow card) 36' (yellow-red card) 58'; Van Beek (yellow card) 38'	Stadium: Johan Cruyff Arena; Attendance: 53,320; Referee: Björn Kuipers

28 January 2018 20	Utrecht	0−0	Ajax	Utrecht
12:30 CET	Görtler (yellow card) 31' (yellow-red card) 90+1'; Ayoub (yellow card) 79'; Janssen (yellow card) 80'	Report	Huntelaar (yellow card) 30'	Stadium: Stadion Galgenwaard; Attendance: 21,768; Referee: Danny Makkelie

4 February 2018 21	Ajax	3−1	NAC Breda	Amsterdam
16:45 CET	Van de Beek 25'; Neres 39'; De Ligt (yellow card) 56'; Ziyech 90+3'	Report	Ambrose 6', (yellow card) 42'; Verschueren (yellow card) 21'; Meijers (yellow card) 29' (yellow-red card) 90+2'	Stadium: Johan Cruyff Arena; Attendance: 51,886; Referee: Ed Janssen

7 February 2018 22	Roda JC Kerkrade	2−4	Ajax	Kerkrade
20:45 CET	Gustafson 2', (yellow card) 88'; Vancamp 80'	Report	Van de Beek 11'; Ziyech 24'; Veltman (yellow card) 50'; Huntelaar 74', 82'; Tagliafico (yellow card) 80'	Stadium: Parkstad Limburg Stadion; Attendance: 14,484; Referee: Björn Kuipers

11 February 2018 23	Ajax	2−1	Twente	Amsterdam
12:30 CET	Kluivert 3'; De Ligt (yellow card) 34'; Ziyech (yellow card) 60'; Schöne 71' (pen.)	Report	Ter Avest (yellow card) 45'; Tighadouini 66'; Bijen (yellow card) 75'	Stadium: Johan Cruyff Arena; Attendance: 52,443; Referee: Serdar Gözübüyük

18 February 2018 24	PEC Zwolle	0−1	Ajax	Zwolle
16:45 CET	Sandler (yellow card) 82'	Report	Huntelaar 54'; Tagliafico (yellow card) 68'	Stadium: MAC³PARK Stadion; Attendance: 13,250; Referee: Kevin Blom

25 February 2018 25	Ajax	0−0	ADO Den Haag	Amsterdam
12:30 CET	Tagliafico (yellow card) 37'; Onana (yellow card) 38'; Eiting (yellow card) 82'	Report	David (yellow card) 38'; Beugelsdijk (yellow card) 57'; Johnsen (yellow card) 87'	Stadium: Johan Cruyff Arena; Attendance: 52,822; Referee: Pol van Boekel

4 March 2018 26	Vitesse	3−2	Ajax	Arnhem
14:30 CET	Foor 16'; Faye (yellow card) 22'; Linssen 57', 71', (yellow card) 59'; Castaignos (yellow card) 89'	Report	Cassierra 61'; Ziyech (yellow card) 70'; S. de Jong 85'; De Ligt (yellow card) 90+2'	Stadium: GelreDome; Attendance: 19,876; Referee: Björn Kuipers

11 March 2018 27	Ajax	4−1	Heerenveen	Amsterdam
14:30 CET	De Ligt 31'; Tagliafico 59'; Huntelaar (yellow card) 85'; Van de Beek 88'; Neres 90+3'	Report	Ødegaard 33'; Schaars (yellow card) 36'	Stadium: Johan Cruyff Arena; Attendance: 52,523; Referee: Jochem Kamphuis

18 March 2018 28	Sparta Rotterdam	2−5	Ajax	Rotterdam
14:30 CET	Chabot (yellow card) 10'; Kramer 31'; Fischer (yellow card) 52'; Sanusi 90+2'	Report	De Ligt (yellow card) 19'; Huntelaar 33'; Nissen (yellow card) 34'; Schöne 53'; Kluivert 59'; Tagliafico (yellow card) 60'; Ziyech 66', 86'	Stadium: Het Kasteel; Attendance: 10,606; Referee: Dennis Higler

1 April 2018 29	Groningen	1−2	Ajax	Groningen
14:30 CEST	Van Weert 14'; Mani (penalty missed) 25'; Warmerdam (yellow card) 70'	Report	Veltman (yellow card) 24' (yellow-red card) 86'; Ziyech (yellow card) 25'; Kluivert 64'; Van de Beek (yellow card) 87'; Huntelaar 89'; Onana (yellow card) 90+2'	Stadium: Noordlease Stadion; Attendance: 22,568; Referee: Kevin Blom

8 April 2018 30	Ajax	1−0	Heracles Almelo	Amsterdam
16:45 CEST	Wöber (yellow card) 33'; Neres 63'	Report		Stadium: Johan Cruyff Arena; Attendance: 52,495; Referee: Bas Nijhuis

15 April 2018 31	PSV	3−0	Ajax	Eindhoven
16:45 CEST	Pereiro 23'; Hendrix (yellow card) 30'; De Jong 38'; Bergwijn 54'	Report	Tagliafico (yellow card) 35' (yellow-red card) 80'; S. de Jong (red card) 83'; Onana (yellow card) 83'; Neres (yellow card) 86'	Stadium: Philips Stadion; Attendance: 35,000; Referee: Danny Makkelie

19 April 2018 32	Ajax	4−1	VVV-Venlo	Amsterdam
20:45 CEST	Schöne (penalty missed) 9'; Neres 45', 45+3'; Huntelaar 59'; Ziyech 79'	Report	Seuntjens 43'	Stadium: Johan Cruyff Arena; Attendance: 30,295; Referee: Jochem Kamphuis

29 April 2018 33	Ajax	3−0	AZ	Amsterdam
14:30 CEST	Van de Beek 38'; Kluivert 49'; Neres 87'	Report	Til (yellow card) 31'; Svensson (yellow card) 55'	Stadium: Johan Cruyff Arena; Attendance: 35,000; Referee: Serdar Gözübüyük

6 May 2018 34	Excelsior	1−2	Ajax	Rotterdam
14:30 CEST	De Ligt 20' (o.g.)	Report	Kluivert 48'; Dolberg 53' (pen.)	Stadium: Van Donge & De Roo Stadion; Attendance: 4,400; Referee: Bas Nijhuis

=== KNVB Cup ===
20 September 2017 Round 1	Scheveningen	1−5	Ajax	The Hague
18:30 CEST	Rog 62'; De Jong (yellow card) 69'	Report	Dolberg 5', 80', 85' (pen.); S. de Jong 42'; Koorndijk 57' (o.g.)	Stadium: Cars Jeans Stadion; Attendance: 3,500; Referee: Björn Kuipers

25 October 2017 Round 2	De Dijk	1−4	Ajax	Volendam
18:30 CEST	El Gourari (yellow card) 30', (goal) 52'; Schilder (yellow card) 44'; Tol (yellow card) 75'	Report	F. de Jong 16'; S. de Jong 26', 31'; Černý 46'	Stadium: Kras Stadion; Attendance: 6,618; Referee: Jochem Kamphuis

20 December 2017 Round of 16	Twente	1−1 (a.e.t.) (6−5 p)	Ajax	Enschede
20:45 CET	Holla (yellow card) 30'; Lam (yellow card) 84' (yellow-red card) 111'; Cuevas (yellow card) 88'; Assaidi 90+1'	Report	Kluivert 18'; S. de Jong (yellow card) 72'; Dijks (yellow card) 94'	Stadium: De Grolsch Veste; Attendance: 26,700; Referee: Pol van Boekel
	Penalties
	Assaidi (penalty scored); Holla (penalty scored); Tighadouini (penalty missed); Cuevas (penalty scored); Liendl (penalty scored); Laukart (penalty scored); Bijen (penalty scored)		(penalty scored) Schöne; (penalty scored) S. de Jong; (penalty scored) Van de Beek; (penalty missed) Ziyech; (penalty scored) Huntelaar; (penalty scored) Veltman; (penalty missed) De Ligt

=== UEFA Champions League ===
==== Third qualifying round ====
26 July 2017 First leg	Nice (France)	1–1	(Netherlands) Ajax	Nice, France
20:45 CEST	Balotelli (yellow card) 30', (goal) 32'; Eysseric (yellow card) 41'	Report	Van de Beek 49', (yellow card) 78'; De Ligt (yellow card) 66'; Schöne (yellow card) 69'; Sánchez (yellow card) 78'; Veltman (yellow card) 90+1'	Stadium: Allianz Riviera; Attendance: 31,342; Referee: Carlos del Cerro Grande (Spain)

2 August 2017 Second leg	Ajax (Netherlands)	2–2 (3–3a agg.)	(France) Nice	Amsterdam, Netherlands
20:45 CEST	Sánchez (yellow card) 9', (goal) 57'; Ziyech (yellow card) 22'; Van de Beek 26'	Report	Souquet 3'; Sarr (yellow card) 18'; Koziello (yellow card) 38'; Eysseric (yellow card) 60'; Marcel 79'	Stadium: Amsterdam Arena; Attendance: 51,845; Referee: Andre Marriner (England)

=== UEFA Europa League ===
==== Play-off round ====
17 August 2017 First leg	Ajax (Netherlands)	0–1	(Norway) Rosenborg	Amsterdam, Netherlands
20:00 CEST	Kluivert (yellow card) 74'; Schöne (yellow card) 90'; Dijks (yellow card) 90+2'	Report	Bjørdal (yellow card) 9'; De Lanlay (yellow card) 62'; Adegbenro 77'	Stadium: Amsterdam Arena; Attendance: 50,717; Referee: Craig Thomson (Scotland)

24 August 2017 Second leg	Rosenborg (Norway)	3–2 (4–2 agg.)	(Netherlands) Ajax	Trondheim, Norway
19:30 CEST	Midtsjø (yellow card) 21'; Bendtner 25'; Adegbenro 80', 89', (yellow card) 90'	Report	Viergever (yellow card) 45+3'; Younes 60'; Schöne 61'; Veltman (yellow card) 87'	Stadium: Lerkendal Stadion; Referee: Ruddy Buquet (France)

=== Friendlies ===
8 July 2017	Werder Bremen (Germany)	2–1	(Netherlands) Ajax	Hippach, Austria
16:00 CEST	Eggestein 46'; Kainz 62' (pen.)		Cassierra 21'	Stadium: Lindenstadion
Note: Match was abandoned after 72 minutes when Abdelhak Nouri collapsed due to cardiac arrhythmia.

15 July 2017	Ajax (Netherlands)	3–3	(Belgium) Genk	Amsterdam, Netherlands
	Kluivert 2'; Ziyech 12'; Neres 56'	Report	Samatta 21'; Trossard 26'; Schrijvers 90' (pen.)	Stadium: Sportpark De Toekomst

15 July 2017	Ajax (Netherlands)	4–2	(Greece) PAOK	Amsterdam, Netherlands
	Mazraoui 4'; Huntelaar 25'; Cassierra 65'; Flemming 88'	Report	Varela 37'; Prijović 50'	Stadium: Sportpark De Toekomst

18 July 2017	Lyon B (France)	2–2	(Netherlands) Ajax	Décines-Charpieu, France
16:00 CEST	Kalulu 42', 85'	Report	Černý 53'; F. de Jong 66'	Stadium: Groupama OL Training Center

18 July 2017	Lyon (France)	2–0	(Netherlands) Ajax	Bourgoin-Jallieu, France
21:00 CEST	Viergever 53' (o.g.); Gouiri 77'	Report		Stadium: Stade Pierre Rajon

28 July 2017	Ajax (Netherlands)	3–3	(England) Hull City	Amsterdam, Netherlands
14:00 CEST	F. de Jong 7'; Huntelaar 17'; Černý 53'	Report	Henriksen 5'; Batty 76'; Weir 85'	Stadium: Sportpark De Toekomst

5 August 2017	Ajax (Netherlands)	3–1	(Netherlands) Sparta Rotterdam	Amsterdam, Netherlands
	Černý; Huntelaar	Report	Brogno	Stadium: Sportpark De Toekomst

21 November 2017	Ajax (Netherlands)	2–1	(Germany) Borussia Mönchengladbach	Amsterdam, Netherlands
	Oxford 12' (o.g.); Dolberg 75'	Report	Grifo 57'	Stadium: Johan Cruyff Arena; Attendance: 12,000

13 January 2018	Ajax (Netherlands)	5−1	(Denmark) Lyngby BK	Albufeira, Portugal
13:45 CET	Ziyech 8', 62'; Van de Beek 15', 70'; Huntelaar 39'	Report	George 35'	Stadium: Estádio Municipal de Albufeira

13 January 2018	Ajax (Netherlands)	1−1	(Germany) MSV Duisburg	Albufeira, Portugal
15:00 CET	Sierhuis 78'	Report	Zeefuik 22' (o.g.)	Stadium: Estádio Municipal de Albufeira

11 May 2018 Champions Golden Cup	Al Ahly (Egypt)	1−0	(Netherlands) Ajax	Al Ain, United Arab Emirates
18:00	Mohsen 83'	Report		Stadium: Hazza Bin Zayed Stadium

== Transfers for 2017–18 ==
=== Summer transfer window ===
For a list of all Dutch football transfers in the summer window (1 July 2017 to 31 August 2017) please see List of Dutch football transfers summer 2017.

==== Arrivals ====
- The following players moved to AFC Ajax.

	Name	Position	Transfer type	Previous club	Fee
	Return from loan spell				
Substituted on	(Croatia) Robert Murić	Forward	1 June 2017	(Italy) Pescara	-
Substituted on	(Netherlands) Richairo Zivkovic	Forward	1 June 2017	(Netherlands) Utrecht	-
Substituted on	(Netherlands) Indy Groothuizen	Goalkeeper	1 June 2017	(Denmark) Nordsjælland	-
Substituted on	(Netherlands) Django Warmerdam	Defender	1 June 2017	(Netherlands) PEC Zwolle	-
Substituted on	(Netherlands) Leeroy Owusu	Defender	1 June 2017	(Netherlands) Excelsior	-
Substituted on	(Netherlands) Queensy Menig	Forward	1 June 2017	(Netherlands) PEC Zwolle	-
Substituted on	(Morocco) Zakaria El Azzouzi	Forward	1 June 2017	(Netherlands) Sparta Rotterdam	-
Substituted on	(Netherlands) Mitchell Dijks	Defender	1 June 2017	(England) Norwich City	-
	Transfer				
Substituted on	(Denmark) Victor Jensen	Midfielder	2 June 2017	(Denmark) Copenhagen	€2,600,000
Substituted on	(Netherlands) Benjamin van Leer	Goalkeeper	28 June 2017	(Netherlands) Roda JC	€700,000
Substituted on	(Brazil) Danilo	Forward	7 July 2017	(Brazil) Santos	€2,000,000
Substituted on	(Croatia) Dominik Kotarski	Goalkeeper	7 July 2017	(Croatia) Dinamo Zagreb	?
Substituted on	(Colombia) Luis Manuel Orejuela	Defender	8 August 2017	(Colombia) Deportivo Cali	€3,500,000
Substituted on	(Norway) Dennis Johnsen	Forward	11 August 2017	(Netherlands) Heerenveen	€2,000,000
Substituted on	(Austria) Maximilian Wöber	Defender	24 August 2017	(Austria) Rapid Wien	€7,500,000
Substituted on	(Netherlands) Siem de Jong	Midfielder	28 August 2017	(England) Newcastle United	€2,000,000
Substituted on	(South Africa) Dean Solomons	Defender	31 August 2017	(South Africa) Ajax Cape Town	?
Substituted on	(South Africa) Leo Thethani	Forward	31 August 2017	(South Africa) Ajax Cape Town	?
	Free Transfer				
Substituted on	(Netherlands) Klaas-Jan Huntelaar	Forward	1 June 2017	(Germany) Schalke 04	-
Substituted on	(Netherlands) Teun Bijleveld	Midfielder	15 June 2017	(Netherlands) AZ	-
Substituted on	(Morocco) Issam El Maach	Goalkeeper	21 June 2017	(Netherlands) Vitesse	-
Substituted on	(Netherlands) Robin Schouten	Defender	4 July 2017	(Netherlands) AZ	-
Substituted on	(Finland) Saku Ylätupa	Midfielder	21 July 2017	(Finland) HJK Helsinki	-
Substituted on	(Greece) Kostas Lamprou	Goalkeeper	1 August 2017	(Netherlands) Willem II	-

==== Departures ====
- The following players moved from AFC Ajax.

	Name	Position	Transfer type	New club	Fee
	Out on loan				
Substituted off	(Netherlands) Leeroy Owusu	Defender	21 June 2017	(Netherlands) Almere City	-
Substituted off	(Morocco) Zakaria El Azzouzi	Forward	10 July 2017	(Netherlands) Excelsior	-
	Return from loan spell				
Substituted off	(Burkina Faso) Bertrand Traoré	Forward	1 June 2017	(England) Chelsea	-
	Transfer				
Substituted off	(Netherlands) Django Warmerdam	Midfielder	1 May 2017	(Netherlands) Groningen	€800,000
Substituted off	(Netherlands) Davy Klaassen	Midfielder	15 June 2017	(England) Everton	€27,000,000
Substituted off	(Netherlands) Richairo Zivkovic	Forward	16 June 2017	(Belgium) Oostende	?
Substituted off	(Netherlands) Pelle Clement	Forward	28 June 2017	(England) Reading	€300,000
Substituted off	(Netherlands) Kenny Tete	Defender	7 July 2017	(France) Lyon	€5,000,000
Substituted off	(Serbia) Dragiša Gudelj	Defender	11 July 2017	(Switzerland) Wohlen	?
Substituted off	(Netherlands) Jaïro Riedewald	Defender	24 July 2017	(England) Crystal Palace	€9,000,000
Substituted off	(Colombia) Davinson Sánchez	Defender	18 August 2017	(England) Tottenham Hotspur	€42,000,000
Substituted off	(Netherlands) Queensy Menig	Forward	31 August 2017	(France) Nantes	€500,000
Substituted off	(Netherlands) Indy Groothuizen	Goalkeeper	31 August 2017	(Netherlands) ADO Den Haag	?
Substituted off	(Croatia) Robert Murić	Forward	31 August 2017	(Portugal) Braga	€500,000
	Free Transfer				
Substituted off	(Indonesia) Ezra Walian	Forward	1 June 2017	(Netherlands) Almere City	-
Substituted off	(Netherlands) Diederik Boer	Goalkeeper	2 June 2017	(Netherlands) PEC Zwolle	-
Substituted off	(Netherlands) Anderson López	Forward	10 June 2017	(France) Monaco	-
Substituted off	(South Africa) Thulani Serero	Midfielder	14 June 2017	(Netherlands) Vitesse	-
Substituted off	(Netherlands) Daishawn Redan	Forward	22 June 2017	(England) Chelsea	-
Substituted off	(Netherlands) Joe van der Sar	Goalkeeper	1 July 2017	(Netherlands) ADO Den Haag	-
Substituted off	(Germany) Heiko Westermann	Defender	3 July 2017	Austria Wien	-
Substituted off	(Netherlands) Kees de Boer	Midfielder	5 July 2017	(Wales) Swansea City	-
Substituted off	(Denmark) Markus Bay	Midfielder	8 August 2017	(Denmark) Viborg	-
Substituted off	(Belgium) Nathan Leyder	Defender	31 August 2017	(Belgium) Vigor Wuitens Hamme	-

=== Winter transfer window ===
For a list of all Dutch football transfers in the winter window (1 January 2018 to 1 February 2018) please see List of Dutch football transfers winter 2017–18.

==== Arrivals ====
- The following players moved to AFC Ajax.

	Name	Position	Transfer type	Previous club	Fee
	Transfer				
Substituted on	(Argentina) Nicolás Tagliafico	Defender	4 January 2018	(Argentina) Independiente	€4,500,000
Substituted on	(Germany) Nicolas Kühn	Forward	16 January 2018	(Germany) RB Leipzig	€2,000,000
Substituted on	(Denmark) Rasmus Nissen	Defender	23 January 2018	(Denmark) FC Midtjylland	€5,500,000

==== Departures ====
- The following players moved from AFC Ajax.

	Name	Position	Transfer type	New club	Fee
	Out on loan				
Substituted off	(Netherlands) Mauro Savastano	Defender	2 January 2018	(Netherlands) Go Ahead Eagles	-
Substituted off	(Netherlands) Deyovaisio Zeefuik	Defender	31 January 2018	(Netherlands) FC Groningen	-
	Transfer				
Substituted off	(Netherlands) Damil Dankerlui	Defender	9 January 2018	(Netherlands) Willem II	?
	Free Transfer				
Substituted off	(Netherlands) Pascal Struijk	Defender	26 January 2018	(England) Leeds United	-
