= List of Dutch football transfers summer 2017 =

This is a list of Dutch football transfers for the 2017 summer transfer window. Only moves featuring Eredivisie are listed.

== Eredivisie ==
Note: Flags indicate national team as has been defined under FIFA eligibility rules. Players may hold more than one non-FIFA nationality.

=== ADO Den Haag ===
In:

No.	Pos.	Nation	Player
1	GK	NED	Indy Groothuizen (from Jong Ajax, previously on loan at (Denmark) Nordsjælland)
9	FW	NOR	Bjørn Johnsen (from (Scotland) Heart of Midlothian)
10	MF	NED	Lex Immers (from (Belgium) Club Brugge)
11	FW	NED	Ricardo Kishna (on loan from (Italy) Lazio, previously on loan at (France) Lille)
15	DF	NED	Bas Kuipers (from Excelsior)
20	DF	NED	Nick Kuipers (from Maastricht)
23	MF	NED	Abdenasser El Khayati (from (England) Queens Park Rangers, previously on loan)
30	MF	NED	Erik Falkenburg (from Willem II)
33	FW	GER	Melvyn Lorenzen (from (Germany) Werder Bremen)
77	FW	CUW	Elson Hooi (from (Denmark) Vendsyssel)

Out:

No.	Pos.	Nation	Player
1	GK	LTU	Ernestas Šetkus (to (Israel) Hapoel Haifa)
2	DF	NED	Dion Malone (to (Azerbaijan) Gabala)
6	MF	NED	Aschraf El Mahdioui (to (Slovakia) Trenčín)
7	MF	NED	Kevin Jansen (to NEC)
9	FW	JPN	Mike Havenaar (to (Japan) Vissel Kobe)
11	MF	NED	Randy Wolters (loan return to Go Ahead Eagles)
12	MF	GER	Tom Trybull (to (England) Norwich City)
15	DF	COD	Abel Tamata (released)
19	FW	NED	Dennis van der Heijden (to Almere City, previously on loan at Volendam)
20	MF	NED	Ruben Schaken (released)
23	FW	NED	Ludcinio Marengo (to (Norway) Brann, previously on loan at Go Ahead Eagles)
24	GK	NED	Rody de Boer (to Telstar)
30	FW	NED	Jerdy Schouten (to Telstar)
33	FW	NED	Gervane Kastaneer (to (Germany) 1. FC Kaiserslautern)

=== Ajax ===
In:

No.	Pos.	Nation	Player
5	DF	AUT	Maximilian Wöber (from (Austria) Rapid Wien)
9	FW	NED	Klaas-Jan Huntelaar (from (Germany) FC Schalke 04)
12	GK	GRE	Kostas Lamprou (from Willem II)
22	GK	NED	Benjamin van Leer (from Roda JC)
23	MF	NED	Siem de Jong (from (England) Newcastle United, previously on loan at PSV)
28	DF	COL	Luis Manuel Orejuela (from (Colombia) Deportivo Cali)

Out:

No.	Pos.	Nation	Player
2	DF	NED	Kenny Tete (to (France) Lyon)
4	DF	NED	Jairo Riedewald (to (England) Crystal Palace)
5	DF	COL	Davinson Sánchez (to (England) Tottenham Hotspur)
9	FW	BFA	Bertrand Traoré (loan return to (England) Chelsea)
10	MF	NED	Davy Klaassen (to (England) Everton)
16	DF	GER	Heiko Westermann (to Austria Wien)
33	GK	NED	Diederik Boer (to (Netherlands) PEC Zwolle)
39	FW	NED	Richairo Zivkovic (to (Belgium) Oostende, previously on loan at Utrecht)

=== AZ Alkmaar ===
In:

No.	Pos.	Nation	Player
1	GK	NED	Marco Bizot (from (Belgium) Genk)
6	MF	NOR	Fredrik Midtsjø (from (Norway) Rosenborg)
10	MF	NED	Marko Vejinović (on loan from Feyenoord)
23	DF	NED	Ricardo van Rhijn (on loan from (Belgium) Club Brugge)

Out:

No.	Pos.	Nation	Player
1	GK	URU	Sergio Rochet (to (Turkey) Sivasspor)
2	DF	SWE	Mattias Johansson (to (Greece) Panathinaikos)
5	DF	NED	Ridgeciano Haps (to Feyenoord)
6	MF	NED	Ben Rienstra (on loan to Willem II)
11	FW	SWE	Muamer Tanković (to (Sweden) Hammarby)
14	DF	NED	Jop van der Linden (on loan to Willem II)
23	DF	NED	Derrick Luckassen (to PSV)
24	GK	NED	Tim Krul (loan return to (England) Newcastle United)
29	DF	NED	Fernando Lewis (to Willem II)

=== SBV Excelsior ===
In:

No.	Pos.	Nation	Player
3	DF	USA	Shane O'Neill (from (Cyprus) Apollon Limassol, previously on loan at NAC Breda)
4	DF	BEL	Wout Faes (on loan from (Belgium) Anderlecht)
14	MF	MAR	Ali Messaoud (from (Liechtenstein) Vaduz, previously on loan at NEC)
17	DF	USA	Desevio Payne (from Groningen)
19	FW	MAR	Zakaria El Azzouzi (on loan from Jong Ajax)
23	MF	BEL	Jinty Caenepeel (from Eindhoven)
24	GK	NED	Theo Zwarthoed (from Go Ahead Eagles)
25	GK	ISL	Ögmundur Kristinsson (from (Sweden) Hammarby)
28	DF	NED	Lorenzo Burnet (from (Slovakia) Slovan Bratislava, previously on loan at NEC)

Out:

No.	Pos.	Nation	Player
1	GK	POL	Filip Kurto (to Roda JC)
2	DF	NED	Khalid Karami (released)
4	DF	NED	Henrico Drost (to RKC Waalwijk)
5	DF	NED	Bas Kuipers (to ADO Den Haag)
7	FW	NED	Nigel Hasselbaink (to (Israel) Hapoel Kiryat Shmona)
9	MF	NED	Terell Ondaan (released)
14	FW	CMR	Cedric Badjeck (to De Treffers)
17	MF	ANG	Fredy (to (Portugal) Belenenses)
20	DF	NED	Elso Brito (to Telstar)
21	MF	SRB	Danilo Pantić (loan return to (England) Chelsea)
25	GK	NED	Warner Hahn (loan return to Feyenoord)
30	DF	NED	Jordy de Wijs (loan return to PSV)
44	DF	BRA	Arghus (loan return to (Portugal) Braga)

=== Feyenoord ===
In:

No.	Pos.	Nation	Player
4	DF	NED	Jerry St. Juste (from Heerenveen)
5	DF	NED	Ridgeciano Haps (from AZ)
7	FW	NED	Jean-Paul Boëtius (from (Switzerland) Basel, previously on loan at (Belgium) Genk)
11	FW	SWE	Sam Larsson (from Heerenveen)
17	DF	NED	Kevin Diks (on loan from (Italy) Fiorentina, previously on loan at Vitesse)
19	FW	NED	Steven Berghuis (from (England) Watford, previously on loan)
21	MF	MAR	Sofyan Amrabat (from Utrecht)
30	GK	NED	Ramón ten Hove (from Feyenoord U19)

Out:

No.	Pos.	Nation	Player
2	DF	NED	Rick Karsdorp (to (Italy) Roma)
4	DF	NED	Terence Kongolo (to (France) Monaco)
5	MF	NED	Marko Vejinovic (on loan to AZ)
7	FW	NED	Dirk Kuyt (retired)
11	MF	NED	Eljero Elia (to (Turkey) Istanbul Başakşehir)
15	DF	NED	Lucas Woudenberg (to Heerenveen)
16	GK	NED	Warner Hahn (to Heerenveen, previously on loan at Excelsior)
24	DF	NED	Calvin Verdonk (on loan to N.E.C., previously on loan at Zwolle)
27	MF	SWE	Simon Gustafson (on loan to Roda JC)
30	GK	SWE	Pär Hansson (to (Sweden) Helsingborg)
31	DF	NED	Wessel Dammers (to Fortuna Sittard)
38	MF	NED	Gustavo Hamer (on loan to Dordrecht)
40	FW	NED	Mohamed El Hankouri (on loan to Willem II)
--	MF	NED	Jari Schuurman (on loan to NEC, previously on loan at Willem II)

=== FC Groningen ===
In:

No.	Pos.	Nation	Player
2	DF	ENG	Todd Kane (on loan from (England) Chelsea)
4	DF	NED	Mike te Wierik (from Heracles Almelo)
9	FW	RSA	Lars Veldwijk (from (Belgium) Kortrijk, previously on loan at (Norway) Aalesund)
14	FW	MEX	Uriel Antuna (on loan from (England) Manchester City U23)
16	GK	BEL	Kevin Begois (from Zwolle)
21	MF	NED	Django Warmerdam (from Jong Ajax, previously on loan at Zwolle)
25	MF	JPN	Ritsu Doan (on loan from (Japan) Gamba Osaka)

Out:

No.	Pos.	Nation	Player
2	DF	AUS	Jason Davidson (loan return to (England) Huddersfield)
11	FW	NED	Bryan Linssen (to Vitesse)
13	FW	NOR	Alexander Sørloth (to (Denmark) Midtjylland)
16	GK	NED	Stefan van der Lei (to Willem II)
21	DF	NED	Martijn van der Laan (to Cambuur)
22	MF	SWE	Simon Tibbling (to (Denmark) Brøndby)
23	MF	NED	Hedwiges Maduro (to (Cyprus) Omonia)
24	MF	NED	Tom Hiariej (to (Australia) Central Coast Mariners)
25	DF	USA	Desevio Payne (to Excelsior)
30	GK	NED	Peter van der Vlag (to Emmen)

=== SC Heerenveen ===
In:

No.	Pos.	Nation	Player
1	GK	NED	Warner Hahn (from Feyenoord, previously on loan at Excelsior)
2	DF	NED	Denzel Dumfries (from Sparta Rotterdam)
3	DF	DEN	Daniel Høegh (from (Switzerland) Basel)
4	DF	NOR	Nicolai Næss (from (United States) Columbus Crew)
7	FW	AUS	Marco Rojas (from (Australia) Melbourne Victory)
15	FW	SRB	Nemanja Mihajlović (from (Serbia) Partizan)
16	DF	NED	Lucas Woudenberg (from Feyenoord)
--	GK	DEN	Martin Hansen (on loan from (Germany) FC Ingolstadt 04)

Out:

No.	Pos.	Nation	Player
1	GK	NED	Erwin Mulder (to (England) Swansea City)
2	DF	BEL	Stefano Marzo (to (Belgium) Lokeren)
4	DF	NED	Joost van Aken (to (England) Sheffield Wednesday)
5	DF	NED	Lucas Bijker (to (Spain) Cádiz)
7	FW	NED	Luciano Slagveer (to (Belgium) Lokeren)
11	FW	SWE	Sam Larsson (to Feyenoord)
16	DF	NED	Jerry St. Juste (to Feyenoord)
17	MF	NED	Branco van den Boomen (to FC Eindhoven, previously on loan at Willem II)
18	MF	DEN	Younes Namli (to PEC Zwolle)
22	DF	NED	Caner Cavlan (on loan to (Turkey) Boluspor, previously on loan at (Turkey) Şanlıurfaspor)
25	DF	NED	Willem Huizing (to Emmen)
26	DF	DEN	Stefan Gartenmann (to (Denmark) SønderjyskE)
28	FW	NOR	Dennis Johnsen (to Jong Ajax)
30	GK	NED	Wieger Sietsma (to (England) MK Dons, previously on loan at Emmen)
32	DF	NED	Joris Voest (to Emmen)
33	GK	NED	Maarten de Fockert (on loan to Go Ahead Eagles, previously on loan at VVV)
36	DF	NED	Jair Oosterlen (to Sparta Rotterdam U21)
--	DF	HUN	Kenny Otigba (to (Hungary) Ferencváros, previously on loan at (Turkey) Kasımpaşa)

=== Heracles Almelo ===
In:

No.	Pos.	Nation	Player
3	DF	BEL	Dries Wuytens (from Willem II)
5	DF	NED	Bart van Hintum (free agent)
6	DF	BEL	Dario Van den Buijs (from FC Eindhoven)
10	FW	NED	Paul Gladon (on loan from (England) Wolverhampton)
21	MF	GER	Sebastian Jakubiak (from (Germany) SV Rödinghausen)
22	DF	NED	Roland Baas (from FC Groningen)
25	FW	NED	Zeki Erkilinc (on loan from FC Twente)
26	GK	NED	Harm Zeinstra (from Cambuur)
27	MF	NED	Niels Leemhuis (from Quick '20)
34	DF	NED	Jeff Hardeveld (from FC Utrecht)
35	MF	CPV	Jamiro Monteiro (from Cambuur)

Out:

No.	Pos.	Nation	Player
3	DF	NED	Mike te Wierik (to FC Groningen)
9	FW	SWE	Samuel Armenteros (to (Italy) Benevento)
10	MF	NED	Thomas Bruns (to Vitesse)
11	FW	NED	Tarik Kada (on loan to FC Eindhoven)
21	MF	GER	Robin Gosens (to (Italy) Atalanta)
23	DF	NED	Mark-Jan Fledderus (retired)
25	GK	NED	Renze Fij (on loan to Dordrecht)
26	MF	NED	Sander Thomas (to Go Ahead Eagles)
27	DF	NED	Justin Hoogma (to (Germany) TSG 1899 Hoffenheim)
31	DF	NED	Marijn de Kler (to Achilles '29)

=== NAC Breda ===
In:

No.	Pos.	Nation	Player
3	DF	NED	Menno Koch (from PSV, previously on loan at FC Utrecht)
5	DF	EST	Karol Mets (from (Norway) Viking)
9	FW	FRA	Thierry Ambrose (on loan from (England) Manchester City U23)
10	MF	NED	Rai Vloet (from PSV, previously on loan at FC Eindhoven)
11	FW	ESP	Paolo Fernandes (on loan from (England) Manchester City U23)
12	GK	AUS	Mark Birighitti (from (England) Swansea City)
21	FW	DEN	Thomas Enevoldsen (from (Denmark) AaB)
22	DF	ESP	Pablo Marí (on loan from (England) Manchester City, previously on loan at (Spain) Girona)
23	GK	NED	Nigel Bertrams (from Willem II)
35	DF	ENG	James Horsfield (from (England) Manchester City, previously on loan)
69	DF	ESP	Angeliño (on loan from (England) Manchester City, previously on loan at (Spain) Mallorca)

Out:

No.	Pos.	Nation	Player
5	DF	ENG	Ashley Smith-Brown (loan return to (England) Manchester City U23)
9	FW	BEL	Cyriel Dessers (to FC Utrecht)
11	FW	NED	Danny Verbeek (to FC Den Bosch)
12	GK	NED	Sven van der Maaten (on loan to Telstar)
15	MF	NED	Grad Damen (on loan to Helmond Sport)
16	FW	ENG	Brandon Barker (loan return to (England) Manchester City U23)
21	FW	ENG	Fisayo Adarabioyo (on loan to FC Oss)
22	DF	NED	Gino Demonf (to Jong FC Utrecht)
23	MF	NED	Vinnie Vermeer (on loan to FC Oss)
24	DF	NED	Daan Klomp (on loan to FC Oss)
25	DF	NED	Jesse van Bezooijen (to (Belgium) Zwarte Leeuw)
26	GK	BEL	Jorn Brondeel (loan return to (Belgium) Lierse)
28	MF	BEL	Charni Ekangamene (loan return to (Belgium) Zulte Waregem)
29	DF	USA	Shane O'Neill (loan return to (Cyprus) Apollon Limassol)
34	FW	NED	Jari Oosterwijk (loan return to Twente)

=== PEC Zwolle ===
In:

No.	Pos.	Nation	Player
3	DF	ARG	Nicolás Freire (on loan from (Uruguay) Torque)
5	DF	NED	Dico Koppers (from Willem II)
9	FW	POL	Piotr Parzyszek (from De Graafschap)
11	FW	NED	Terell Ondaan (from Excelsior)
16	GK	NED	Diederik Boer (from Ajax)
21	MF	DEN	Younes Namli (from Heerenveen)
23	MF	NED	Erik Bakker (from Cambuur)

Out:

No.	Pos.	Nation	Player
3	DF	NED	Ted van de Pavert (on loan to NEC)
5	DF	NED	Calvin Verdonk (loan return to Feyenoord)
9	FW	NED	Anass Achahbar (on loan to NEC)
11	FW	NED	Queensy Menig (loan return to Jong Ajax)
15	MF	MAR	Ouasim Bouy (loan return to (Italy) Juventus)
16	GK	BEL	Kevin Begois (to FC Groningen)
18	MF	BRA	Gustavo Hebling (loan return to (France) Paris Saint-Germain B)
17	DF	CZE	Josef Kvída (on loan to Almere City)
21	DF	NED	Django Warmerdam (loan return to Jong Ajax)
22	DF	NED	Bart Schenkeveld (to (Australia) Melbourne City)
23	MF	NED	Danny Holla (to Twente)
35	FW	FRA	Hervin Ongenda (released)
44	FW	DEN	Nicolai Brock-Madsen (loan return to (England) Birmingham City)
98	MF	MAR	Hachim Mastour (loan return to (Italy) Milan)

=== PSV ===
In:

No.	Pos.	Nation	Player
3	DF	NED	Derrick Luckassen (from AZ)
11	FW	MEX	Hirving Lozano (from (Mexico) Pachuca)
13	GK	NED	Eloy Room (from Vitesse)

Out:

No.	Pos.	Nation	Player
--	MF	NED	Rai Vloet (to NAC Breda, previously on loan at FC Eindhoven)
--	DF	NED	Menno Koch (to NAC Breda)
3	DF	MEX	Héctor Moreno (to (Italy) Roma)
6	MF	NED	Davy Pröpper (to (England) Brighton & Hove Albion)
10	MF	NED	Siem de Jong (loan return to (England) Newcastle United)
15	DF	NED	Jetro Willems (to (Germany) Eintracht Frankfurt)
18	MF	MEX	Andrés Guardado (to (Spain) Betis)
22	GK	NED	Remko Pasveer (to SBV Vitesse)
25	MF	UKR	Oleksandr Zinchenko (loan return to (England) Manchester City)
30	DF	NED	Jordy de Wijs (on loan to Excelsior)
31	GK	NED	Hidde Jurjus (on loan to Roda JC)

=== Roda JC ===
In:

No.	Pos.	Nation	Player
1	GK	NED	Hidde Jurjus (on loan from PSV)
10	MF	SWE	Simon Gustafson (on loan from Feyenoord)
13	MF	GER	Tsiy-William Ndenge (on loan from (Germany) Borussia Mönchengladbach)
14	FW	GER	Mario Engels (from (Poland) Slask Wroclaw)
16	GK	POL	Filip Kurto (from Excelsior)
17	DF	BEL	Jannes Vansteenkiste (from (Belgium) Royal Antwerp)
18	FW	BEL	Jorn Vancamp (on loan from (Belgium) Anderlecht)
22	DF	GER	Ashton Götz (free agent)

Out:

No.	Pos.	Nation	Player
--	MF	AFG	Farshad Noor (to (Sweden) Eskilstuna, previously on loan at SC Cambuur)
--	FW	CYP	Nestoras Mitidis (to (Cyprus) AEK Larnaca, previously on loan)
1	GK	NED	Benjamin van Leer (to AFC Ajax)
2	DF	SLO	Martin Milec (loan return to (Belgium) Standard Liège)
7	MF	BEL	Tom Van Hyfte (to (Belgium) Beerschot Wilrijk)
11	FW	BEL	Beni Badibanga (loan return to (Belgium) Standard Liège)
14	MF	NGR	Abdul Jeleel Ajagun (loan return to (Greece) Panathinaikos)
15	FW	GRE	Thanasis Papazoglou (loan return to (Belgium) Kortrijk)
16	MF	ESP	Marcos Gullón (released)
18	MF	NED	Jens van Son (to FC Den Bosch)
21	FW	BUL	Simeon Raykov (to (Bulgaria) Lokomotiv Plovdiv)
22	GK	BEL	Yves De Winter (to (Belgium) Roeselare)
23	FW	WAL	Simon Church (released)
24	MF	AUT	Stefan Savić (to (Slovenia) Olimpija Ljubljana)
26	GK	NED	Nick Wolters (to FC Dordrecht)
29	MF	FRA	Lyes Houri (loan return to (France) Bastia)
33	DF	BEL	Kahraman Demirtas (released)
44	DF	BEL	Bryan Verboom (loan return to (Belgium) Zulte Waregem)

=== Sparta Rotterdam ===
In:

No.	Pos.	Nation	Player
--	FW	SLO	Dalibor Volaš (from (Slovenia) Celje)
--	GK	NED	Leonard Nienhuis (from SC Cambuur)
--	DF	GER	Jeff Chabot (from (Germany) RB Leipzig II)
--	GK	BEL	Álex Craninx (from (Spain) Real Madrid Castilla)
--	MF	ENG	George Dobson (from (England) West Ham United U23, previously on loan at (England) Walsall)
--	MF	FRA	Franck-Yves Bambock (from (Spain) Huesca)
--	DF	DEN	Frederik Holst (from (Denmark) Brøndby)
--	DF	NED	Sander Fischer (from Go Ahead Eagles)
--	DF	DEN	Nicholas Marfelt (on loan from (Denmark) SønderjyskE)
--	FW	NED	Robert Mühren (on loan from (Belgium) Zulte Waregem)
--	FW	GER	Nick Proschwitz (free agent)

Out:

No.	Pos.	Nation	Player
--	MF	NED	Robert Klaasen (to De Graafschap, previously on loan)
--	DF	NED	Denzel Dumfries (to SC Heerenveen)
--	DF	NED	Rick van Drongelen (to (Germany) Hamburger SV)
--	DF	FRA	Florian Pinteaux (to (France) Chambly)
--	GK	NED	Ricardo Kieboom (to Katwijk)
--	FW	NED	Roland Bergkamp (to Waalwijk)
--	FW	ESP	Iván Calero (to (Spain) Elche)
--	DF	NED	Rick Ketting (to Go Ahead Eagles)
--	MF	NED	Mart Dijkstra (to NEC)
--	GK	NED	Michael Verrips (on loan to Maastricht)
--	MF	NED	David Mendes da Silva (retired)
--	FW	GUI	Mathias Pogba (released)
--	FW	CPV	Jerson Cabral (loan return to (France) Bastia)
--	FW	AUT	Martin Pušić (loan return to (Denmark) Midtjylland)

=== FC Twente ===
In:

No.	Pos.	Nation	Player
3	DF	FIN	Thomas Lam (on loan from (England) Nottingham Forest)
7	FW	MKD	Nikola Gjorgjev (on loan from (Switzerland) Grasshoppers)
9	FW	NED	Tom Boere (from FC Oss)
10	MF	SLO	Haris Vučkić (from (England) Newcastle United, previously on loan at (England) Bradford City)
11	MF	GER	Alexander Laukart (from (Germany) Borussia Dortmund U19)
15	DF	CHI	Cristián Cuevas (on loan from (Chile) Huachipato)
17	FW	AUT	Marko Kvasina (from Austria Wien)
18	MF	AUT	Michael Liendl (from (Germany) 1860 Munich)
21	MF	NED	Danny Holla (from PEC Zwolle)
22	FW	ENG	Isaac Buckley-Ricketts (on loan from (England) Manchester City U23)
24	FW	NED	Jari Oosterwijk (loan return from NAC Breda)
26	GK	BEL	Jorn Brondeel (from (Belgium) Lierse, previously on loan at NAC Breda)
27	FW	NED	Luciano Slagveer (on loan from (Belgium) Lokeren)
34	FW	MAR	Adnane Tighadouini (on loan from (Spain) Málaga, previously on loan at Vitesse)

Out:

No.	Pos.	Nation	Player
1	GK	NED	Nick Marsman (to FC Utrecht)
3	DF	DEN	Joachim Andersen (to (Italy) Sampdoria)
7	FW	GER	Chinedu Ede (to (Thailand) Bangkok United)
10	MF	KOS	Bersant Celina (loan return to (England) Manchester City U23)
11	FW	BEL	Dylan Seys (loan return to (Belgium) Club Brugge)
12	MF	GER	Tim Hölscher (to Go Ahead Eagles)
14	FW	GHA	Yaw Yeboah (loan return to (England) Manchester City U23)
17	FW	TUR	Enes Ünal (loan return to (England) Manchester City)
20	GK	NED	Sonny Stevens (to Go Ahead Eagles)
22	MF	RSA	Kamohelo Mokotjo (to (England) Brentford)
27	FW	GER	Enis Bunjaki (released)
43	MF	POL	Mateusz Klich (to (England) Leeds United)

=== FC Utrecht ===
In:

No.	Pos.	Nation	Player
5	DF	BIH	Dario Đumić (from NEC)
9	FW	DEN	Simon Makienok (from (Italy) Palermo, previously on loan at (England) Preston North End)
11	FW	BEL	Cyriel Dessers (from NAC Breda)
16	GK	NED	Nick Marsman (from FC Twente)
18	MF	NED	Urby Emanuelson (from (England) Sheffield Wednesday)
19	FW	MAR	Bilal Ould-Chikh (free agent)
21	FW	FRA	Jean-Christophe Bahebeck (on loan from (France) Paris Saint-Germain, previously on loan at (Italy) Pescara)
22	MF	NED	Sander van de Streek (from SC Cambuur)
23	MF	MAR	Anouar Kali (from Willem II)
26	MF	ENG	Matty Willock (on loan from (England) Manchester United U23)
27	FW	GER	Lukas Görtler (from (Germany) 1. FC Kaiserslautern)
30	MF	NED	Chris David (from Go Ahead Eagles)

Out:

No.	Pos.	Nation	Player
1	GK	NED	Robbin Ruiter (to (England) Sunderland)
5	DF	DEN	Kevin Conboy (to (Denmark) Randers)
9	FW	NED	Richairo Zivkovic (loan return to Ajax)
10	MF	NED	Nacer Barazite (to (Turkey) Yeni Malatyaspor)
11	MF	GER	Andreas Ludwig (to (Germany) 1. FC Magdeburg)
12	DF	NED	Jeff Hardeveld (to Heracles Almelo)
22	FW	FRA	Sébastien Haller (to (Germany) Eintracht Frankfurt)
23	MF	NED	Wout Brama (to (Australia) Central Coast Mariners)
25	MF	MAR	Sofyan Amrabat (to Feyenoord)
26	MF	NED	Darren Rosheuvel (to SC Cambuur)
28	MF	NED	Issa Kallon (to SC Cambuur, previously on loan at FC Emmen)

=== Vitesse ===
In:

No.	Pos.	Nation	Player
2	DF	ENG	Fankaty Dabo (on loan from (England) Chelsea U23, previously on loan at Swindon Town)
8	MF	ENG	Charlie Colkett (on loan from (England) Chelsea U23, previously on loan at Swindon Town)
9	FW	SLO	Tim Matavž (from (Germany) FC Augsburg, previously on loan at (Germany) 1. FC Nürnberg)
10	MF	NED	Thomas Bruns (from Heracles Almelo)
11	FW	NED	Bryan Linssen (from Groningen)
14	FW	NED	Luc Castaignos (on loan from (Portugal) Sporting CP)
17	MF	RSA	Thulani Serero (from Jong Ajax)
19	MF	ENG	Mason Mount (on loan from (England) Chelsea U23)
22	GK	NED	Remko Pasveer (from PSV)
23	MF	ENG	Mukhtar Ali (from (England) Chelsea U23, previously on loan)

Out:

No.	Pos.	Nation	Player
1	GK	NED	Eloy Room (to PSV)
5	DF	NED	Kelvin Leerdam (to (United States) Seattle Sounders FC)
9	FW	CHN	Zhang Yuning (to (England) West Bromwich Albion)
10	FW	MAR	Adnane Tighadouini (loan return to (Spain) Málaga)
11	FW	BRA	Nathan (loan return to (England) Chelsea U23)
13	FW	NED	Ricky van Wolfswinkel (to (Switzerland) Basel)
17	DF	NED	Kevin Diks (loan return to (Italy) Fiorentina)
18	MF	ZIM	Marvelous Nakamba (to (Belgium) Club Brugge)
20	MF	NED	Mo Osman (released)
30	FW	RUS	Arshak Koryan (to (Russia) Lokomotiv Moscow)
34	MF	ENG	Lewis Baker (loan return to (England) Chelsea)
--	MF	GEO	Valeri Qazaishvili (to (United States) San Jose Earthquakes, previously on loan at (Poland) Legia Warsaw)

=== VVV-Venlo ===
In:

No.	Pos.	Nation	Player
1	GK	GER	Lars Unnerstall (from (Germany) Fortuna Düsseldorf)
5	DF	BEL	Leroy Labylle (from Maastricht)
11	FW	GER	Lennart Thy (on loan from (Germany) Werder Bremen, previously on loan at (Germany) FC St. Pauli)
14	FW	MAR	Tarik Tissoudali (on loan from (France) Le Havre, previously on loan at SC Cambuur)
20	DF	NED	Damian van Bruggen (from Jong PSV)
21	MF	AUS	Terry Antonis (from (Greece) PAOK, previously on loan at (Australia) Western Sydney Wanderers)
22	FW	NED	Mink Peeters (on loan from (Spain) Real Madrid Castilla)
25	MF	NGR	Kelechi Nwakali (on loan from (England) Arsenal U23, previously on loan at Maastricht)
26	FW	GER	Etienne Amenyido (on loan from (Germany) Borussia Dortmund II)

Out:

No.	Pos.	Nation	Player
1	GK	NED	Maarten de Fockert (loan return to Heerenveen)
5	DF	NED	Cendrino Misidjan (to FC Dordrecht)
11	FW	NED	Leandro Resida (to RKC Waalwijk)
14	MF	NED	Tim Receveur (to De Graafschap)
20	FW	NED	Joey Sleegers (loan return to NEC)
21	MF	JPN	Rintaro Tashima (to (Croatia) Dinamo Zagreb II)
22	GK	NED	Roy Oomen (released])
25	DF	TUR	Evren Korkmaz (on loan to FC Den Bosch)
26	MF	NED	Vincent Bogaerts (to UNA)
27	DF	NED	Reno Kochanowski (to EVV)
31	DF	NED	Stijn Brinkman (to Helmond Sport U21)
32	MF	NED	Jasko Dzurlic (to EVV)
33	MF	USA	Gedion Zelalem (loan return to (England) Arsenal U23)

=== Willem II ===
In:

No.	Pos.	Nation	Player
1	GK	GER	Timon Wellenreuther (from (Germany) FC Schalke 04)
2	DF	NED	Fernando Lewis (from AZ)
5	DF	NED	Jop van der Linden (on loan from AZ)
6	MF	ESP	Pedro Chirivella (on loan from (England) Liverpool, previously on loan at Go Ahead Eagles)
7	FW	FRA	Karim Coulibaly (from (France) Nancy)
14	MF	ENG	Daniel Crowley (from (England) Arsenal U23, previously on loan at Go Ahead Eagles)
16	MF	POL	Bartłomiej Urbański (from (Poland) Legia Warsaw)
17	FW	SLO	Etien Velikonja (from (Turkey) Gençlerbirliği)
19	FW	NED	Mohamed El Hankouri (on loan from Feyenoord)
21	DF	GRE	Konstantinos Tsimikas (on loan from (Greece) Olympiacos)
23	MF	NED	Ben Rienstra (on loan from AZ)
38	FW	BEL	Ismail Azzaoui (on loan from (Germany) VfL Wolfsburg)
93	GK	NED	Stefan van der Lei (from Groningen)

Out:

No.	Pos.	Nation	Player
1	GK	GRE	Kostas Lamprou (to Ajax)
5	DF	NED	Dico Koppers (to PEC Zwolle)
6	MF	BEL	Funso Ojo (to (England) Scunthorpe United)
7	MF	NED	Jari Schuurman (loan return to Feyenoord)
10	MF	NED	Erik Falkenburg (to ADO Den Haag)
15	DF	BEL	Dries Wuytens (to Heracles Almelo)
16	MF	NOR	Vajebah Sakor (loan return to (Italy) Juventus)
17	MF	NED	Branco van den Boomen (loan return to Heerenveen)
20	MF	MAR	Anouar Kali (to FC Utrecht)
23	DF	NED	Nigel Bertrams (to NAC Breda)
24	DF	NED	Guus Joppen (to NEC)
26	DF	BEL	Derrick Tshimanga (to (Belgium) OH Leuven)
30	MF	ROU	Andreas Calcan (on loan to FC Dordrecht)
46	DF	NED	Pele van Anholt (to (United States) LA Galaxy)
58	FW	BEL	Obbi Oularé (loan return to (England) Watford)
