= Markus Bay =

Danish footballer (born 1997)

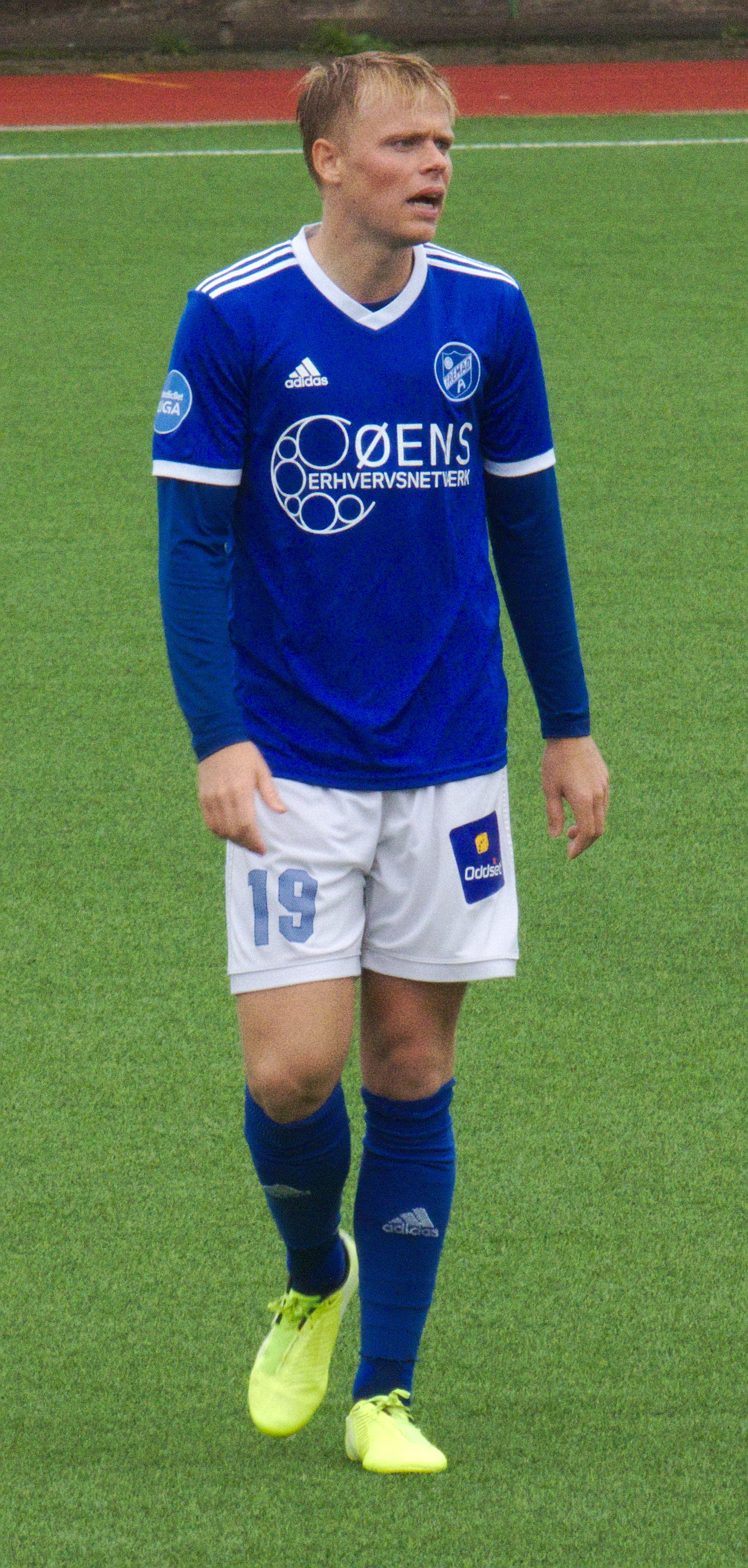
- Markus Bay in 2019.

Personal information
- Full name: Markus Strøm Bay
- Date of birth: 17 February 1997 (age 29)
- Place of birth: Brøndby, Denmark
- Position: Midfielder

Team information
- Current team: Fremad Amager
- Number: 8

Youth career
- –2013: Brøndby
- 2013–2016: Ajax

Senior career*
Years	Team	Apps	(Gls)
2016–2017	Jong Ajax	15	(0)
2017–2018	Viborg	11	(0)
2018–2023	Fremad Amager	150	(18)
2023–2025	Hillerød	45	(4)
2025–	Fremad Amager	37	(1)

International career
2012–2103	Denmark U16	11	(6)
2013	Denmark U17	11	(0)
2016	Denmark U19	1	(1)
- * Club domestic league appearances and goals as of 3 October 2026

Markus Strøm Bay (born 17 February 1997) is a Danish professional footballer who plays as a midfielder for Danish 2nd Division side Fremad Amager.

== Club career ==
=== Early years ===
Bay is a youth exponent from Brøndby IF, but in 2013 he transferred to the Ajax youth system. He signed a 3-year youth contract with the club. Bay started on the B1 team, and later joined the A1 team alongside Donny van de Beek and Abdelhak Nouri. After the winter break of that season he got injured in his groin. From that on, he was nearly out for 1.5 years with this injury, and wasn't ready until 2016. Bay revealed that it was a very bad period for him and he was close to retire due to this injury.

=== Jong Ajax ===
The midfielder was promoted to Jong Ajax in the summer 2016.

He made his debut with Jong Ajax on 19 August 2016 in an Eerste Divisie game against FC Den Bosch. He replaced Vince Gino Dekker in the 82nd minute, in a 5–2 home win.

However, Bay played 15 games for Jong Ajax in the 2016/17 season.

=== Viborg ===
On 8 August 2017, Bay signed with Danish Superliga club Viborg FF. Just a few weeks after joining the club, the manager who signed him, Johnny Mølby was fired. This resulted in Viborg FF changing their playing style to a style that did not match the creative midfielder.

=== Fremad Amager ===
On 25 July 2018, Bay signed with Danish 1st Division club Fremad Amager. Markus Bay told the press that he was hoping to get a fresh start at Fremad Amager under the management of Jan Michaelsen. On 22 August 2018, Bay scored his first league goal for Fremad Amager against FC Roskilde.

=== Hillerød ===
After five year in Fremad Amager, it was confirmed on 1 September 2023, that Bay had moved to newly promoted Danish 1st Division side Hillerød on a two-year deal.

Bay left the club in June 2025, as his contract expired.

=== Return to Fremad Amager ===
On 31 July 2025 it was confirmed, that Bay had returned to his former club, Fremad Amager.
