= Kieboom =

Kieboom is a Dutch surname and it means "rock tree". Notable persons with this name include:

- Carter Kieboom (born 1997), American Major League Baseball player
- Jeanette Kieboom (born 1959), Australian javelin thrower
- Ricardo Kieboom (born 1991), Dutch footballer
- Spencer Kieboom (born 1991), American Major League Baseball player
