= Donny van de Beek =

Dutch footballer (born 1997)

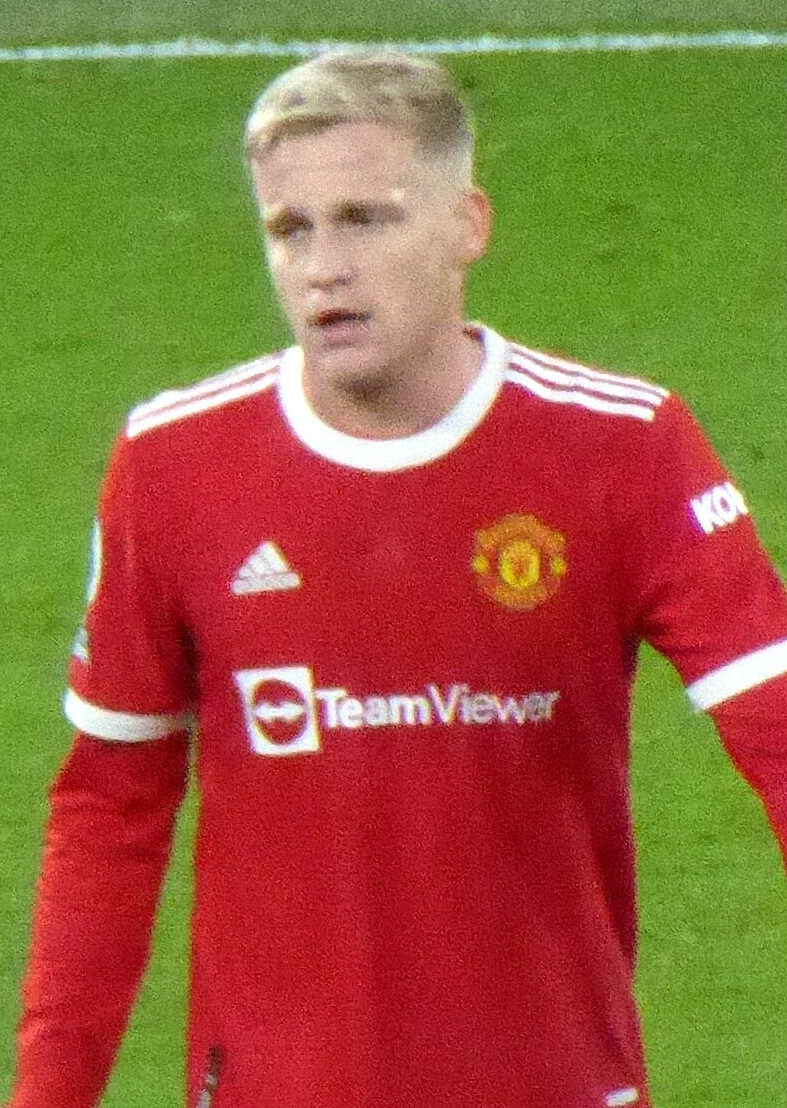
- Van de Beek playing for Manchester United in 2021

Personal information
- Full name: Donny van de Beek
- Date of birth: 18 April 1997 (age 29)
- Place of birth: Nijkerkerveen, Netherlands
- Height: 1.84 m (6 ft 0 in)
- Position: Midfielder

Team information
- Current team: Girona
- Number: 6

Youth career
- Veensche Boys
- 2008–2015: Ajax

Senior career*
Years	Team	Apps	(Gls)
2015–2017	Jong Ajax	35	(13)
2015–2020	Ajax	118	(28)
2020–2024	Manchester United	35	(2)
2022	→ Everton (loan)	7	(1)
2024	→ Eintracht Frankfurt (loan)	8	(0)
2024–	Girona	35	(3)

International career
2013–2014	Netherlands U17	16	(2)
2014–2016	Netherlands U19	20	(4)
2016	Netherlands U20	2	(0)
2016–2017	Netherlands U21	3	(1)
2017–2021	Netherlands	19	(3)
Medal record
Men's football
Representing Netherlands
UEFA Nations League
Runner-up	2019 Portugal
UEFA European Under-17 Championship
Runner-up	2014 Malta
- * Club domestic league appearances and goals as of 24 October 2026 (UTC)

Donny van de Beek (Dutch: [ˈdɔni vɑn də ˈbeːk]; born 18 April 1997) is a Dutch professional footballer who plays as a midfielder for Segunda División club Girona.

In youth international football, Van de Beek made more than 40 appearances for the Netherlands from under-17 to under-21 level. In November 2017, he made his senior international debut for the Netherlands national team against Romania. In 2019, he was part of the squad that reached the first ever UEFA Nations League final, but lost to Portugal.

== Early life ==
Van de Beek was born in Nijkerkerveen. His parents are André and Gerdina van de Beek. André is a supporter of Ajax and took Donny to their stadium at the age of five. Donny's younger brother Rody played for Veensche Boys.

== Club career ==
=== Early years ===
Van de Beek began his career as a boy with the local Veensche Boys' academy where his father, André, once played. In August 2014, he joined the Ajax youth academy signing a three-year contract, and was assigned to the D-team. He progressed further through the academy and featured in the A1 team Supercup victory against the Feyenoord A1 team. On 27 January 2015, he signed a contract extension, to keep him at the club until mid-2018.

Van de Beek made his debut for Jong Ajax (the Ajax reserve team) in the Eerste Divisie against Sparta Rotterdam in January 2015. Two months later, manager Frank de Boer called him to the senior team for a league match against ADO Den Haag as an injury replacement. However, he was an unused substitute in that match. At the end of the 2014–15 season, he won the Ajax Talent of the Future award.

In November 2015, Van de Beek was called to the senior team for a UEFA Europa League match against Scottish club Celtic. He made his European debut in the match, which Ajax won 2–1. He termed his debut as "beautiful" and added: "I have taken my duels well. It was of course difficult because the game went back and forth continuously. But I think I did fine." Three days later, Van de Beek made his first team debut in a 2–0 league victory against PEC Zwolle. In the following month, he scored his first goal for Ajax in a 1–1 draw against Norwegian club Molde. As he scored the goal, his head collided with opposition player Joona Toivio's causing his left eyebrow to bleed. Commenting on the goal, he said that he would not soon forget it. The goal also won him the club's Goal of the Month award.

Voetbal International reported in January 2016 that manager De Boer was impressed by Van de Beek and said he would continue to play with the first team "until further notice". After the departures of John Heitinga and Yaya Sanogo, he was officially promoted to the first team on 16 February. Media reports in March suggested that German club Bayern Munich was interested in signing him. By the end of the 2015–16 season, he cemented his position with the first team, and was also playing regularly for the Ajax under-19 team in the UEFA Youth League. Spanish newspaper Mundo Deportivo reported that Barcelona was considering options to secure his services.

=== Ajax ===
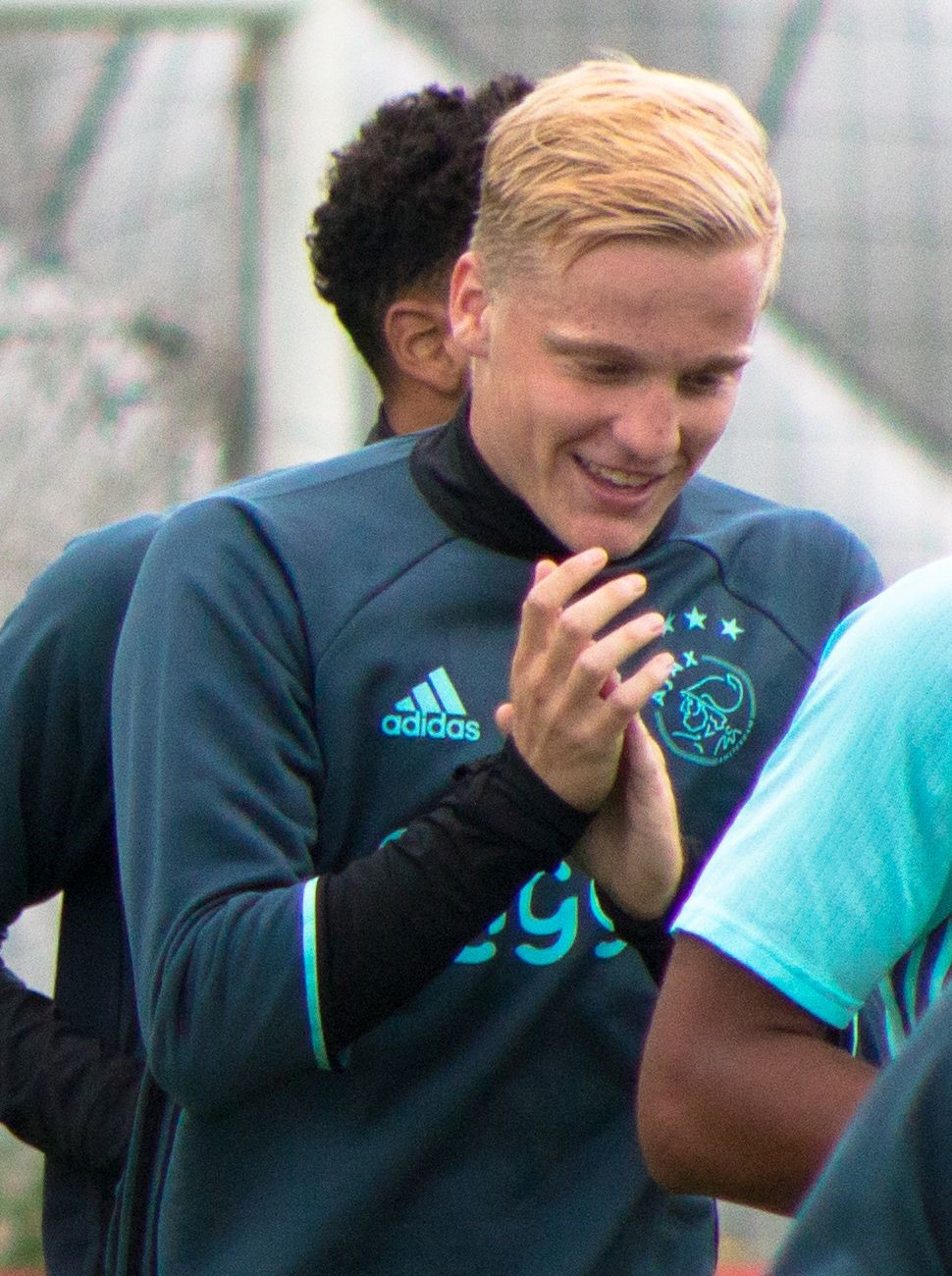
Van de Beek with Ajax in 2016

At the beginning of the 2016–17 season, new manager Peter Bosz included Van de Beek in the Ajax squad for the UEFA Champions League qualification match against Greek club PAOK for a couple of reasons: Bosz was impressed by Van de Beek's performance during pre-season friendlies in Austria, Riechedly Bazoer was injured and Nemanja Gudelj was suspended. On 26 July, he made his Champions League debut against PAOK, starting in the 1–1 draw. While playing for the reserves during the season he and Abdelhak Nouri were the only players who were given more than a 7.0 rating on average by Voetbal International. In November, he was included in the Europa League Team of the Week for his performance against Panathinaikos. He was a part of a midfield trio with Nouri and Lasse Schöne. Van de Beek replaced Schöne in the 70th minute of the Europa League final against Manchester United, with Ajax losing the match 2–0.

Commenting on Van de Beek's 2017–18 pre-season matches, the Dutch newspaper Algemeen Dagblad wrote that he had successfully filled the void created by the departure of Davy Klaassen who had recently moved to English club Everton. In October, English club Tottenham Hotspur scouted him in the Netherlands. He scored a goal in both legs of the Champions League qualifier against French club Nice. In the first leg, he scored an equaliser in the 36th minute of the 1–1 draw; taking an advantage of an error made by opposition goalkeeper Yoan Cardinale. In the second leg, he found the net in the first half of the 2–2 draw. On 18 November, Van de Beek scored a hat-trick in an 8–0 league victory against NAC Breda. Ajax captain Joël Veltman hailed the feat as "extra nice". He featured 34 times in the league and scored eleven times, besides adding six assists. In July 2018, he rejected an offer made by Italian club Roma citing that "Ajax is the right place for his development".

Van de Beek played a pivotal role as the attacking midfielder for Ajax in the 2018–19 season, starting almost every match in all competitions, as the team won their first league title in five years and surprisingly reached the semi-finals of the 2018–19 UEFA Champions League. Van de Beek scored against Juventus on 16 April in the second leg of the quarter-final to help his team knock out the Italian champion with a 3–2 win on aggregate. On 7 May, he scored against Tottenham in the first leg of the semi−final, which resulted in a 1–0 away victory for Ajax. However, Ajax did not manage to advance to the final, losing the tie on away goals after a 2–3 defeat at home in the second leg. In the 2019–20 Champions League season, Van de Beek scored against Valencia in a 3–0 away win, and Chelsea in a 4–4 draw; however, Ajax lost 1–0 at home to Valencia to be eliminated from the group stage.

=== Manchester United ===
==== 2020–2022 ====
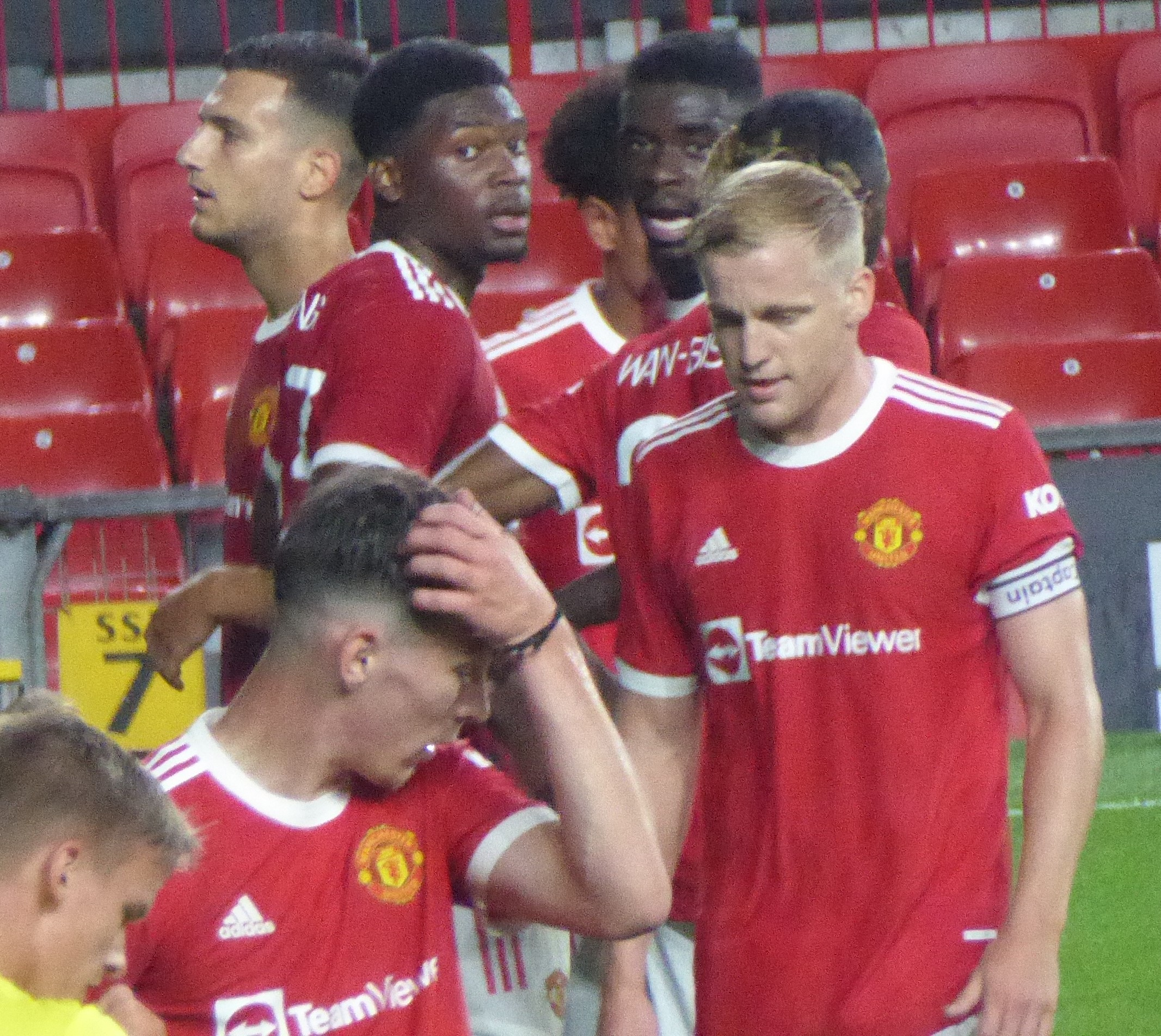
Van de Beek (right) with Manchester United in 2021

On 30 August 2020, Ajax reached an agreement with English Premier League club Manchester United for the transfer of Van de Beek. The transfer was completed three days later with Van de Beek signing a five-year contract for a reported £35 million plus £5 million in add-ons. Van de Beek chose to wear the number 34 jersey as a tribute to former Ajax teammate Abdelhak Nouri, who collapsed during a friendly in 2017 and went into an induced coma. Van de Beek had little involvement during his first season at Manchester United, starting only four Premier League matches. He made his unofficial debut in a friendly against Aston Villa on 12 September, before making his competitive debut as a substitute in the club's opening Premier League fixture at home to Crystal Palace on 19 September; he scored United's only goal in a 3–1 defeat.

In his second season, he did not start in the Premier League at all, although he did get a few starts in the Champions League and the EFL Cup. In what turned out to be manager Ole Gunnar Solskjaer's final match, a 4–1 loss at Watford on 20 November 2021, Van de Beek was subbed in for only the third time in twelve Premier League matches, scoring his second and last Premier League goal for the club. Matters did not improve: in the ten Premier League matches under replacement managers Michael Carrick and Ralf Rangnick, Van de Beek totalled only 9 minutes of playing time.

==== 2022–2024: Loans to Everton and Eintracht Frankfurt ====
On 31 January 2022, Van de Beek was loaned out to Premier League club Everton until the end of the 2021–22 season. He made his debut for Everton in a 3–1 defeat at Newcastle United on 8 February 2022. He started five of the first six matches, but after that his stint at the club was marred by persistent thigh injuries and he only again played in the last Premier League match of the season, a 5–1 defeat against Arsenal; Van de Beek scored the Everton goal.

Following his return to Manchester United from his brief loan, Van de Beek continued to have very limited playing time even under former manager, Erik ten Hag, in the 2022–23 season. In January 2023, he suffered a knee injury in a 3–0 win over Bournemouth that ruled him out for the rest of the season. Van de Beek was offered to other clubs by Manchester United, however following concrete talks on the summer transfer deadline day, Ligue 1 club Lorient decided not to complete a loan move for him. A few days later, he was excluded from the Champions League squad for the 2023–24 season.

On 1 January 2024, Manchester United sent Van de Beek on loan to Bundesliga club Eintracht Frankfurt until the end of the 2023–24 season. The deal included an option-to-buy, reported to be of €11 million, which could have risen to €14 million with add-ons.

=== Girona ===
On 11 July 2024, Van de Beek signed for La Liga club Girona after an agreement with Manchester United was reached. The deal included an initial transfer fee of €500,000, which could later rise to €9.1 million due to various additional bonuses and a sell-on fee.

On 23 September 2025, Van de Beek suffered an achilles tendon rupture in a league game away at Athletic Club, ruling him out for the remainder of the season.

Van de Beek made his return from injury on 18 July 2026, in a pre-season friendly against Al Qadsiah.

== International career ==
Van de Beek played youth international football for the Netherlands at under-17, under-19, under-20 and under-21 levels. On 11 September 2013, Van de Beek made his debut for the under-17 team against Germany. He was part of the squad that managed to reach the final of the 2014 UEFA European Under-17 Championship after defeating Scotland in the semi-final. However, they finished runners-up to England.

On 14 November 2017, Van de Beek made his senior international debut against Romania in a friendly match. He appeared in both games in the 2019 UEFA Nations League Finals as a substitute, as the Netherlands defeated England 3–1 but lost to Portugal in the final 1–0. He scored his first international goal on 14 October 2020 in a 1–1 away draw against Italy in the UEFA Nations League.

On 8 June 2021, Van De Beek was forced to withdraw from the Netherlands' squad for UEFA Euro 2020 just days before the tournament got under way. It was disclosed by the Dutch FA that Van de Beek had been battling through injury and as a result, he had trained away from the main squad. It was confirmed that he could not recover in time and would withdraw from the Netherlands' squad entirely.

== Style of play ==
A tactically versatile and hard-working player, Van de Beek is capable of playing anywhere in midfield. At Ajax, Van de Beek played mainly as a central or an attacking midfielder but can also play as a defensive midfielder. The Spanish newspaper Mundo Deportivo writes that he plays a more offensive role compared to his counterparts on other teams. Goal.com described Van de Beek as a player who has "excellent control and a great eye for a pass as he links up with the attack and is dangerous as he makes runs into the box". While playing for the Ajax academy, he was compared with Davy Klaassen. However, Van de Beek rejected the comparison and said that he was a player who wanted to keep the ball at his feet. Former Ajax captain Joël Veltman described Van de Beek as a player who "works very hard and can play between the lines".

== Personal life ==
Van de Beek is in a relationship with Estelle Bergkamp, the eldest daughter of former Arsenal player Dennis Bergkamp. The couple's first child, a daughter, was born in April 2022. Their second child, a son, was born in February 2024.

== Career statistics ==
=== Club ===
As of match played 27 October 2026

Appearances and goals by club, season and competition
Club	Season	League			National cup (Note: Includes KNVB Cup, FA Cup, Copa del Rey)		League cup (Note: Includes EFL Cup)		Europe		Other		Total	
Club	Season	Division	Apps	Goals	Apps	Goals	Apps	Goals	Apps	Goals	Apps	Goals	Apps	Goals
Jong Ajax	2014–15	Eerste Divisie	6	0	—		—		—		—		6	0
Jong Ajax	2015–16	Eerste Divisie	13	2	—		—		—		—		13	2
Jong Ajax	2016–17	Eerste Divisie	16	6	—		—		—		—		16	6
Jong Ajax	Total		35	8	—		—		—		—		35	8
Ajax	2015–16	Eredivisie	8	0	0	0	—		2 (Note: Appearances in UEFA Europa League)	1	—		10	1
Ajax	2016–17	Eredivisie	19	0	2	0	—		11 (Note: One appearance in UEFA Champions League, ten appearances in UEFA Europa League)	0	—		32	0
Ajax	2017–18	Eredivisie	34	11	1	0	—		4 (Note: Two appearances and two goals in UEFA Champions League, two appearances in UEFA Europa League)	2	—		39	13
Ajax	2018–19	Eredivisie	34	9	5	4	—		18 (Note: Appearances in UEFA Champions League)	4	—		57	17
Ajax	2019–20	Eredivisie	23	8	3	0	—		10 (Note: Eight appearances and two goals in UEFA Champions League, two appearances in UEFA Europa League)	2	1 (Note: Appearance in Johan Cruyff Shield)	0	37	10
Ajax	Total		118	28	11	4	—		45	9	1	0	175	41
Manchester United	2020–21	Premier League	19	1	4	0	4	0	9 (Note: Six appearances in UEFA Champions League, three appearances in UEFA Europa League)	0	—		36	1
Manchester United	2021–22	Premier League	8	1	1	0	1	0	4	0	—		14	1
Manchester United	2022–23	Premier League	7	0	0	0	1	0	2	0	—		10	0
Manchester United	2023–24	Premier League	1	0	—		1	0	0	0	—		2	0
Manchester United	Total		35	2	5	0	7	0	15	0	—		62	2
Everton (loan)	2021–22	Premier League	7	1	—		—		—		—		7	1
Eintracht Frankfurt (loan)	2023–24	Bundesliga	8	0	—		—		0	0	—		8	0
Girona	2024–25	La Liga	26	2	2	0	—		7	1	—		35	3
Girona	2025–26	La Liga	2	0	0	0	—		—		—		2	0
Girona	2026–27	Segunda División	7	1	1	0	—		—		—		8	1
Girona	Total		35	3	3	0	—		7	1	—		45	4
Career total			238	42	19	4	7	0	67	10	1	0	332	55

=== International ===
Appearances and goals by national team and year
National team	Year	Apps	Goals
Netherlands
Netherlands	2017	1	0
Netherlands	2018	4	0
Netherlands	2019	5	0
Netherlands	2020	7	2
Netherlands	2021	2	1
Total		19	3

Netherlands score listed first, score column indicates score after each Van de Beek goal

List of international goals scored by Donny van de Beek
No.	Date	Venue	Cap	Opponent	Score	Result	Competition	Ref.
1	14 October 2020	Stadio Atleti Azzurri d'Italia, Bergamo, Italy	14	Italy	1–1	1–1	2020–21 UEFA Nations League A	
2	11 November 2020	Johan Cruyff Arena, Amsterdam, Netherlands	15	Spain	1–1	1–1	Friendly	
3	30 March 2021	Victoria Stadium, Gibraltar	19	Gibraltar	6–0	7–0	2022 FIFA World Cup qualification	

== Honours ==
Ajax

- Eredivisie: 2018–19
- KNVB Cup: 2018–19
- Johan Cruyff Shield: 2019
- UEFA Europa League runner-up: 2016–17

Manchester United

- EFL Cup: 2022–23
- UEFA Europa League runner-up: 2020–21

Netherlands U17

- UEFA European Under-17 Championship runner-up: 2014

Individual

- Ajax Talent of the Future (Sjaak Swart Award): 2014–15
- Eredivisie Talent of the Month: November 2017
