= Nick Wolters =

Dutch footballer

Personal information
- Date of birth: 5 August 1993 (age 33)
- Place of birth: Kerkrade, Netherlands
- Height: 1.96 m (6 ft 5 in)
- Position: Goalkeeper

Team information
- Current team: AFC Eskilstuna
- Number: 1

Youth career
- –2014: VV Chevremont
- 2014–2015: Roda JC

Senior career*
Years	Team	Apps	(Gls)
2016–2017	Roda JC	0	(0)
2017–2018	Dordrecht	5	(0)
2018–2019	Gottne IF	12	(0)
2020	Eskilstuna City	0	(0)
2021–	AFC Eskilstuna	62	(0)
- * Club domestic league appearances and goals as of 15 November 2023

Nick Wolters (born 5 August 1993) is a Dutch football player. He plays for Swedish club AFC Eskilstuna.

== Career ==
=== Club career ===
He made his Eerste Divisie debut for FC Dordrecht on 1 September 2017 in a game against FC Emmen.

In the summer 2018, Wolters moved to Sweden and joined Gottne IF. He left the club at the end of 2019, to join Division 3 Södra Svealand club Eskilstuna City FK for the 2020 season.

Ahead of the 2021, he joined Superettan club AFC Eskilstuna.
