= Leo Thethani =

South African footballer

Personal information
- Full name: Leo Thethani
- Date of birth: 8 January 1999 (age 27)
- Place of birth: Cape Town, South Africa
- Height: 1.71 m (5 ft 7 in)
- Position: Forward

Team information
- Current team: Cape Town Spurs
- Number: 13

Youth career
- –2014: Mighty United
- 2014–2017: Ajax Cape Town
- 2017–2018: Ajax

Senior career*
Years	Team	Apps	(Gls)
2018–2020	Jong Ajax	13	(0)
2022–	Cape Town Spurs	13	(1)

International career
2017	South Africa U20	1	(0)
- * Club domestic league appearances and goals as of 17:24, 19 November 2023 (UTC)

Leo Thethani (born 8 January 1999) is a South African professional football forward who plays for Cape Town Spurs.

== Club career ==
Thethani, who played for several years in the Netherlands, made his Eerste Divisie debut for Jong Ajax on 10 September 2018 in a game against Jong AZ as a 78th-minute substitute for Danilo.
