= David Meul =

Belgian footballer

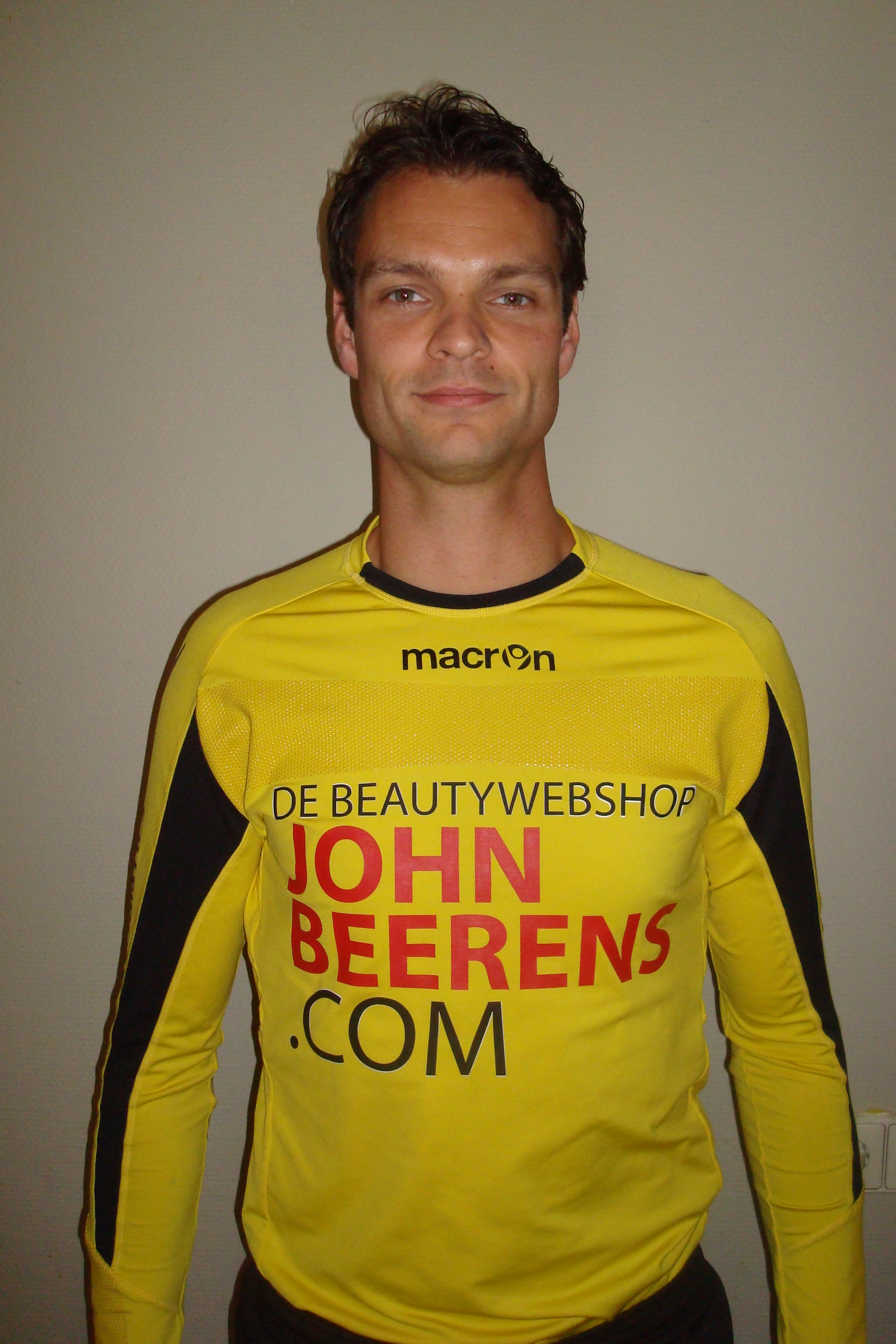

Personal information
- Full name: David Meul
- Date of birth: 3 July 1981 (age 45)
- Place of birth: Beveren, Belgium
- Height: 1.92 m (6 ft 4 in)
- Position: Goalkeeper

Youth career
- Beveren

Senior career*
Years	Team	Apps	(Gls)
2001–2004	Beveren	5	(0)
2004–2005	Racing Mechelen	16	(0)
2005–2007	Hamme	24	(0)
2007–2008	Skoda Xanthi	0	(0)
2008–2009	Fortuna Sittard	34	(0)
2009–2011	Cambuur	72	(0)
2011–2016	Willem II	72	(0)
Total		223	(0)
- * Club domestic league appearances and goals

David Meul (born 3 July 1981) is a retired Belgian professional footballer who played as a goalkeeper. He played for Beveren, Racing Mechelen, Hamme, Skoda Xanthi, Fortuna Sittard, SC Cambuur and Willem II.

== Honours ==
=== Club ===
Willem II

- Eerste Divisie (1): 2013–14
