= Nijkerkerveen =

- Village
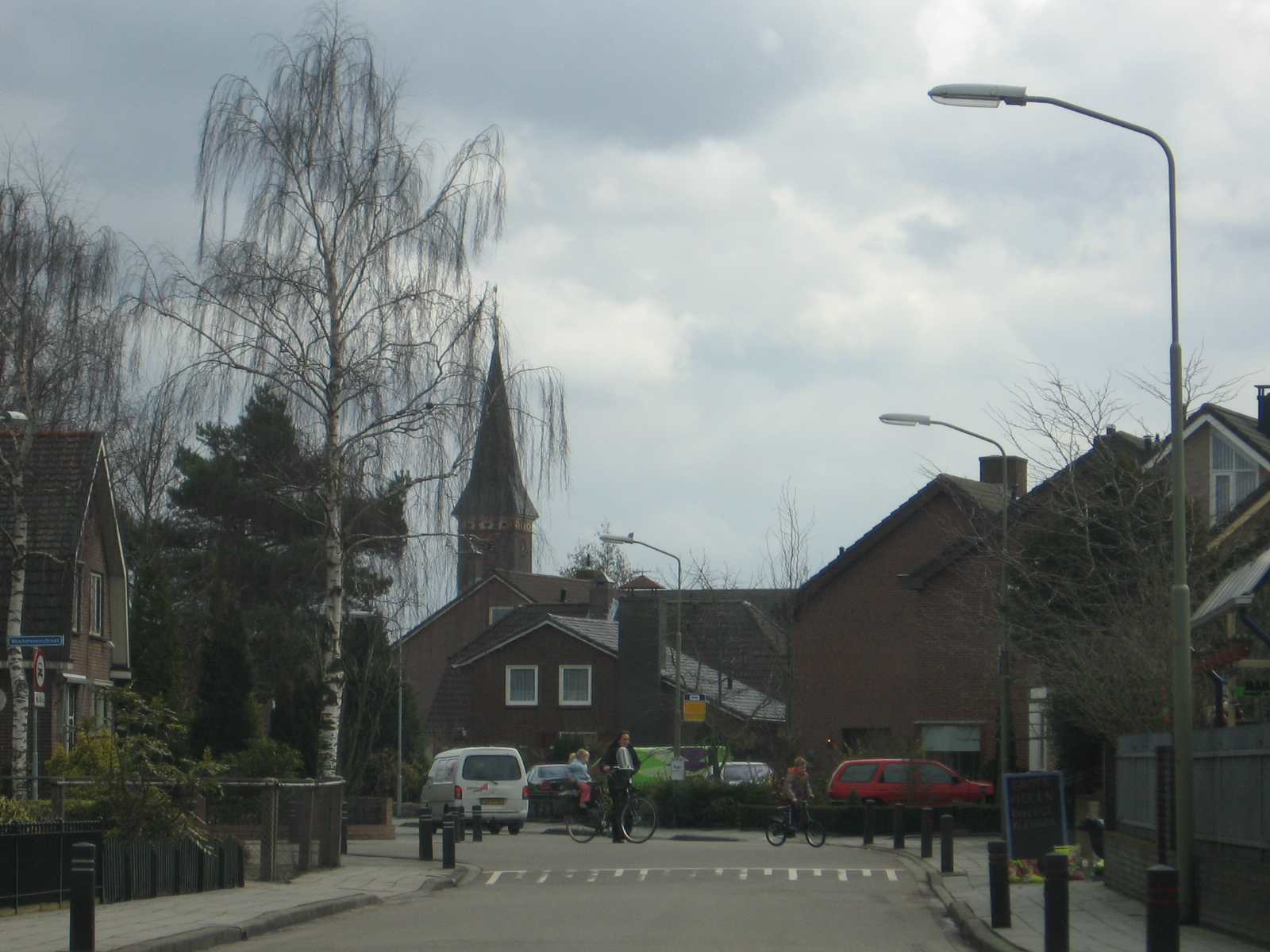

- The village centre (dark green) and the statistical district (light green) of Nijkerkerveen in the municipality of Nijkerk.

- Location in the province of Gelderland in the Netherlands Nijkerkerveen (Netherlands)
- Coordinates: 52°11′42″N 5°28′0″E
- Country: Netherlands
- Province: Gelderland
- Municipality: Nijkerk

Area
  - Total: 3.78 km^{2} (1.46 sq mi)
- Elevation: 3 m (9.8 ft)

Population (2021)
  - Total: 3,530
  - Density: 934/km^{2} (2,420/sq mi)
- Time zone: UTC+1 (CET)
  - Summer (DST): UTC+2 (CEST)
- Postal code: 3864
- Dialing code: 033

Nijkerkerveen is a village in the Dutch province of Gelderland. It is part of the municipality of Nijkerk, and lies about 6 km east of Amersfoort.

The village was first mentioned in 1807 as Nieuwkerker Vheen, and means "bog near Nijkerk". In 1840, it was home to 1,197 people. In 1908, the first church was built.
