= Vince Gino Dekker =

Dutch footballer (born 1997)

Gino Dekker
Personal information
- Full name: Vince Gino Dekker
- Date of birth: 22 March 1997 (age 29)
- Place of birth: Harderwijk, Netherlands
- Height: 1.76 m (5 ft 9 in)
- Position: Left winger

Youth career
- –2003: DVS '33
- 2003–2016: Ajax

Senior career*
Years	Team	Apps	(Gls)
2016–2018	Jong Ajax	15	(3)
2018	Jong AZ	18	(1)
2019	Go Ahead Eagles	12	(0)
2019–2023	SV Spakenburg	74	(8)

International career
2012	Netherlands U15	2	(0)
2012–2013	Netherlands U16	9	(0)
2013	Netherlands U17	3	(0)
2015–2016	Netherlands U19	12	(2)
- * Club domestic league appearances and goals as of 1 July 2022

Vince Gino Dekker (22 March 1997) is a Dutch retired footballer who played as a left winger.

== Club career ==
=== Ajax ===
Dekker came through the youth system at Ajax, where he played in every single youth category from the age of 6. He made his debut at Jong Ajax on 12 August 2016 in an Eerste Divisie game against Almere City. He played the entire match in a 4–1 away win.

=== AZ Alkmaar ===
Dekker joined AZ Alkmaar on 8 May 2018 on a free transfer from AFC Ajax. After playing 18 matches for Jong AZ in the first half of the season, his contract was dissolved.

=== Go Ahead Eagles ===
On 10 January 2019, it was announced that Dekker had signed with Go Ahead Eagles until the end of the season with the option for another season.

=== SV Spakenburg ===
On 26 October 2019, Dekker joined Tweede Divisie club SV Spakenburg.

== Personal life ==
Dekker, who hails from Ermelo, started his own fashion brand Fearless Blood.
