= Kostas Lamprou =

Greek footballer

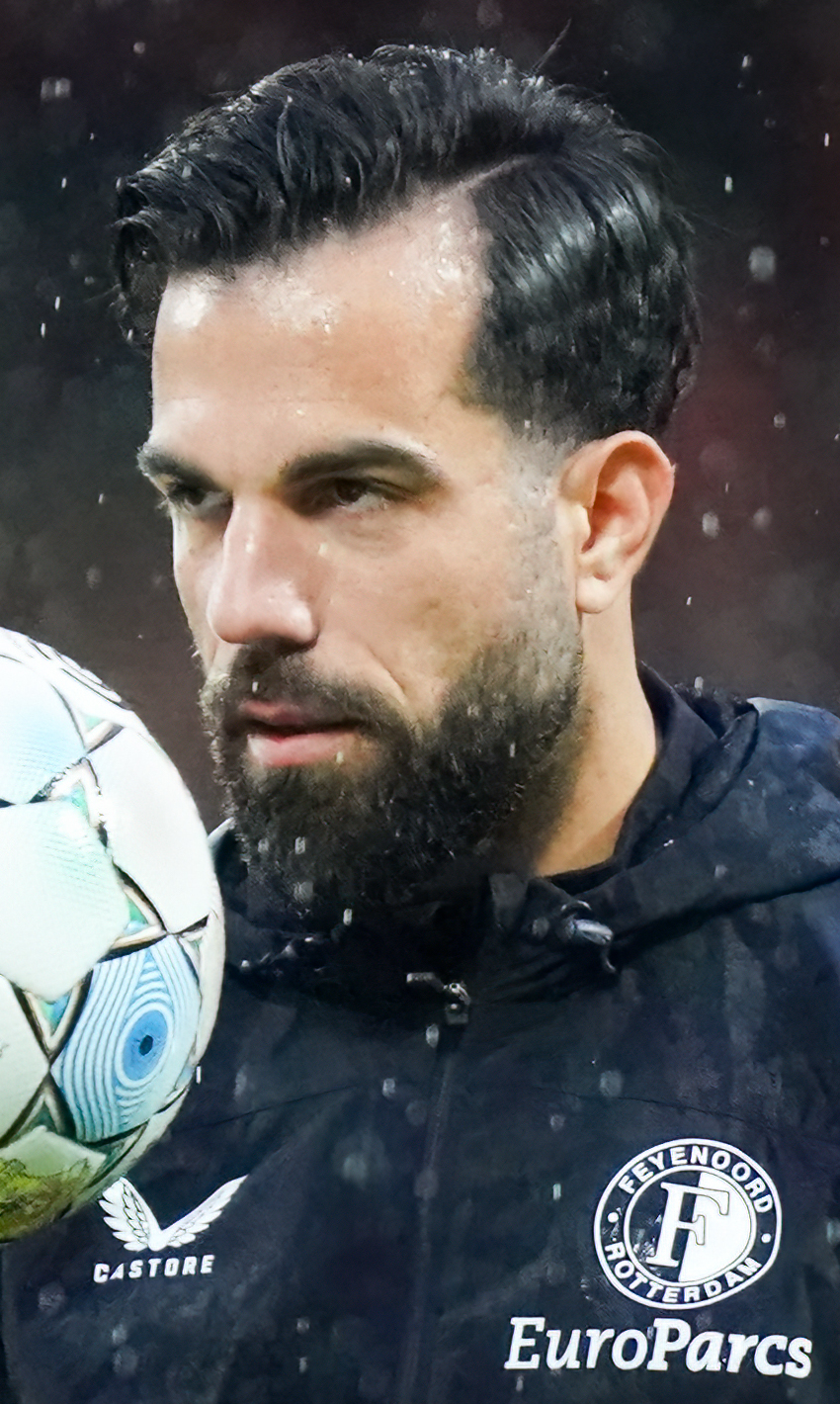
- Lamprou training with Feyenoord in 2024

Personal information
- Full name: Konstantinos Lamprou
- Date of birth: 18 September 1991 (age 35)
- Place of birth: Athens, Greece
- Height: 1.78 m (5 ft 10 in)
- Position: Goalkeeper

Team information
- Current team: NAC Breda
- Number: 31

Youth career
- Atromitos Elpida
- 2004–2005: Ajax
- 2006–2009: Feyenoord

Senior career*
Years	Team	Apps	(Gls)
2009–2015	Feyenoord	14	(0)
2010–2011	→ Excelsior (loan)	0	(0)
2014–2015	→ Willem II (loan)	33	(0)
2015–2017	Willem II	68	(0)
2017–2019	Ajax	3	(0)
2019–2020	Vitesse	0	(0)
2020–2021	RKC Waalwijk	34	(0)
2021–2022	PEC Zwolle	33	(0)
2022–2023	Willem II	27	(0)
2023–2024	Feyenoord	0	(0)
2025–	NAC Breda	2	(0)

International career
2008–2009	Greece U17	3	(0)
2009–2010	Greece U19	9	(0)
2010–2013	Greece U21	14	(0)
- * Club domestic league appearances and goals as of 9 March 2026

Kostas Lamprou (Greek: Κώστας Λάμπρου; born 18 September 1991) is a Greek professional footballer who plays as a goalkeeper for Dutch Eerste Divisie club NAC Breda.

== Club career ==
=== Early years ===
Born in Athens, Lamprou started at amateur club Atromitos Elpida and was scouted by Dutch club Ajax at an international indoor football tournament, where he played as a guest player with the youth of Panathinaikos. He joined Ajax's youth academy at the age of thirteen but was released after six months. After this, he went to play with the amateurs of Amstelveen/Heemraad. There, he stood out among the scouts of Feyenoord and entered their youth academy at Varkenoord. At the age of sixteen, he signed his first professional contract.

=== Feyenoord ===
Lamprou made his Feyenoord debut in the 2009–10 preseason. A year later, Lamprou went on loan to Excelsior but returned to Feyenoord during the winter break after failing to establish himself in the first team at Woudestein. He was given a first-team squad number at De Kuip and was named among the substitutes for a number of Eredivisie games.

Lamprou's official debut came in the KNVB Cup against AGOVV Apeldoorn on 20 September 2011, a 4–0 win for Feyenoord. He spent the rest of the season as second-choice keeper behind Erwin Mulder. The former Sparta Rotterdam and PSV goalkeeper Pim Doesburg commented: "Lamprou is a fantastic keeper. I think he'll have to surrender his spot, management will prefer Mulder. But if it were up to me, I would always leave him in. He has a good kick, good reflexes, is agile and has been playing very well recently. They tell him he is too short. That's ridiculous, no one has ever said I was too short. Lamprou has incredible leaping ability."

==== Loan to Willem II ====
On 4 July 2014, Willem II finalised the loan deal of Lamprou, agreeing to a season-long loan. At Willem II, he joined the established goalkeepers David Meul and Mattijs Branderhorst. Lamprou himself was happy with the chance to play for Willem II. "I have a good feeling about the discussions we have had. I hope we can make a nice season developing my skills even further."

=== Willem II ===
On 19 May 2015, after his exceptional year with Willem II, the club's technical director Carlos Aalbers announced the permanent signing of the Greek international for the next two years: "Kostas fits into the play of Willem II and he has proved last season in the Eredivisie that he is a very good goalkeeper. We are therefore pleased that we sign with him for the next two years." As a loanee of Feyenoord, Lamprou had played his best season so far. A return to De Kuip was not at issue, since the Greek keeper received a new contract. However, from mid-April Willem II were in talks of securing a longer stay for Lamprou in Tilburg. Willem II coach Jurgen Streppel described the goalkeeper as a someone who could further develop his skillset at the club. After a difficult start, he had become one of the pillars of the success of Willem II, who ended in ninth place in the Eredivisie.

He started the 2015–16 season as the starting goalkeeper. On 14 September 2015, in the fifth matchday of Eredivisie in an away game against his former club Feyenoord, he had a number of great saves but could ultimately not avoid a defeat. After a difficult season, where the club fought relegation, he started the 2016–17 season as the undisputable starter. On 4 December 2016, in a 0–0 home draw against FC Twente, he reached 100 appearances in Eredivisie.

=== Ajax ===
On 1 August 2017, Lamprou signed a one-year contract with Dutch club Ajax, becoming the fourth Greek in history to wear the colors of the club after Nikos Machlas, Yannis Anastasiou and Angelos Charisteas. The 26-year-old goalkeeper signed from Willem II, after two excellent seasons with them as a free transfer, even though he knew that he started as a third option. In the beginning of the season he played for Jong Ajax, and on 25 October 2017 he made his debut with the first team in a 4–1 away win KNVB game against De Dijk. Eventually, on 6 May 2018, the Greek goalie was finally handed his Eredivisie debut with Ajax and by saving five Excelsior shots he guided his team to a 2–1 away win, sealing UEFA Champions League participation for the following season.

On 2 July 2018, he renewed his contract with Ajax until the end of the 2018–19 season.

=== Vitesse ===
On 16 July 2019, after two years with Ajax, Lamprou signed a one-year contract with another Dutch club Vitesse for an undisclosed fee.

=== Waalwijk ===
On 30 June 2020, RKC Waalwijk announced that Lamprou has signed with the club on a free transfer until 2021.

=== Zwolle ===
On 11 June 2021, it was announced that Lamprou had signed a 2-year contract for Zwolle, with the coming season being his 12th consecutive season in the Netherlands.

=== Return to Willem II ===
Lamprou returned to Willem II on 12 June 2022, signing a two-year contract with the recently relegated Eerste Divisie side.

=== Return to Feyenoord ===
On 4 August 2023, Lamprou returned to Feyenoord on a one-year contract.

=== NAC Breda ===
On 24 December 2024, Lamrou signed with NAC Breda until the end of the 2024–25 season.

== International career ==
Lamprou's consistency meant his first international call up in October 2012 from Fernando Santos, the coach of Greece national football team.

== Career statistics ==
As of match played 17 May 2026

Appearances and goals by club, season and competition
Club	Season	League			KNVB Cup		Europe		Other		Total	
Club	Season	Division	Apps	Goals	Apps	Goals	Apps	Goals	Apps	Goals	Apps	Goals
Feyenoord	2009–10	Eredivisie	0	0	0	0	—		—		0	0
Feyenoord	2010–11	Eredivisie	0	0	0	0	0	0	—		0	0
Feyenoord	2011–12	Eredivisie	0	0	2	0	—		—		2	0
Feyenoord	2012–13	Eredivisie	12	0	2	0	0	0	—		14	0
Feyenoord	2013–14	Eredivisie	2	0	1	0	0	0	—		3	0
Feyenoord	Total		14	0	5	0	0	0	—		19	0
Excelsior (loan)	2010–11	Eredivisie	0	0	0	0	—		—		0	0
Willem II (loan)	2014–15	Eredivisie	33	0	1	0	—		—		34	0
Willem II	2015–16	Eredivisie	34	0	3	0	—		4 (Note: Appearances in the Eredivisie relegation play-offs)	0	41	0
Willem II	2016–17	Eredivisie	34	0	1	0	—		—		35	0
Willem II	Willem II total		101	0	5	0	—		4	0	110	0
Ajax	2017–18	Eredivisie	1	0	1	0	0	0	—		2	0
Ajax	2018–19	Eredivisie	2	0	3	0	0	0	0	0	5	0
Ajax	Total		3	0	4	0	0	0	0	0	7	0
Vitesse	2019–20	Eredivisie	0	0	2	0	0	0	—		2	0
RKC Waalwijk	2020–21	Eredivisie	34	0	0	0	0	0	—		34	0
PEC Zwolle	2021–22	Eredivisie	33	0	3	0	0	0	—		36	0
Willem II	2022–23	Eerste Divisie	27	0	0	0	—		—		27	0
Feyenoord	2023–24	Eredivisie	0	0	0	0	0	0	—		0	0
NAC Breda	2024–25	Eredivisie	1	0	0	0	—		—		1	0
NAC Breda	2025–26	Eredivisie	1	0	1	0	—		—		2	0
NAC Breda	Total		2	0	4	0	—		—		3	0
Career total			214	0	20	0	0	0	4	0	238	0

== Honours ==
Jong Ajax

- Eerste Divisie: 2017–18

Ajax

- Eredivisie: 2018–19
- KNVB Cup: 2018–19

Feyenoord

- KNVB Cup: 2023–24

Individual

- Eredivisie Team of the Month: October 2020, November 2020, February 2021
