= Ricardo Kieboom =

Dutch footballer

Personal information
- Date of birth: 20 September 1991 (age 35)
- Place of birth: Ridderkerk, Netherlands
- Height: 1.88 m (6 ft 2 in)
- Position: Goalkeeper

Team information
- Current team: SV Slikkerveer

Youth career
- –2009: SV Slikkerveer
- 2009–2010: Spartaan'20
- 2010–2012: ADO Den Haag

Senior career*
Years	Team	Apps	(Gls)
2012	Jong ADO Den Haag	1	(0)
2012–2017	Jong Sparta Rotterdam	48	(0)
2013–2017	Sparta Rotterdam	3	(0)
2017–2020	Katwijk	77	(0)
2021	Kozakken Boys	13	(0)
2023–	SV Slikkerveer	0	(0)
- * Club domestic league appearances and goals as of 13:11, 25 January 2025 (UTC)

Ricardo Kieboom (born 20 September 1991) is a Dutch professional footballer who plays as a goalkeeper for SV Slikkerveer.

At the end of November 2021, Kieboom announced his retirement from football after several years with ankle problems. However, he made his return to the pitch ahead of the 2023–24 season, joining his childhood club, SV Slikkerveer.
