= Benjamin van Leer =

Dutch footballer

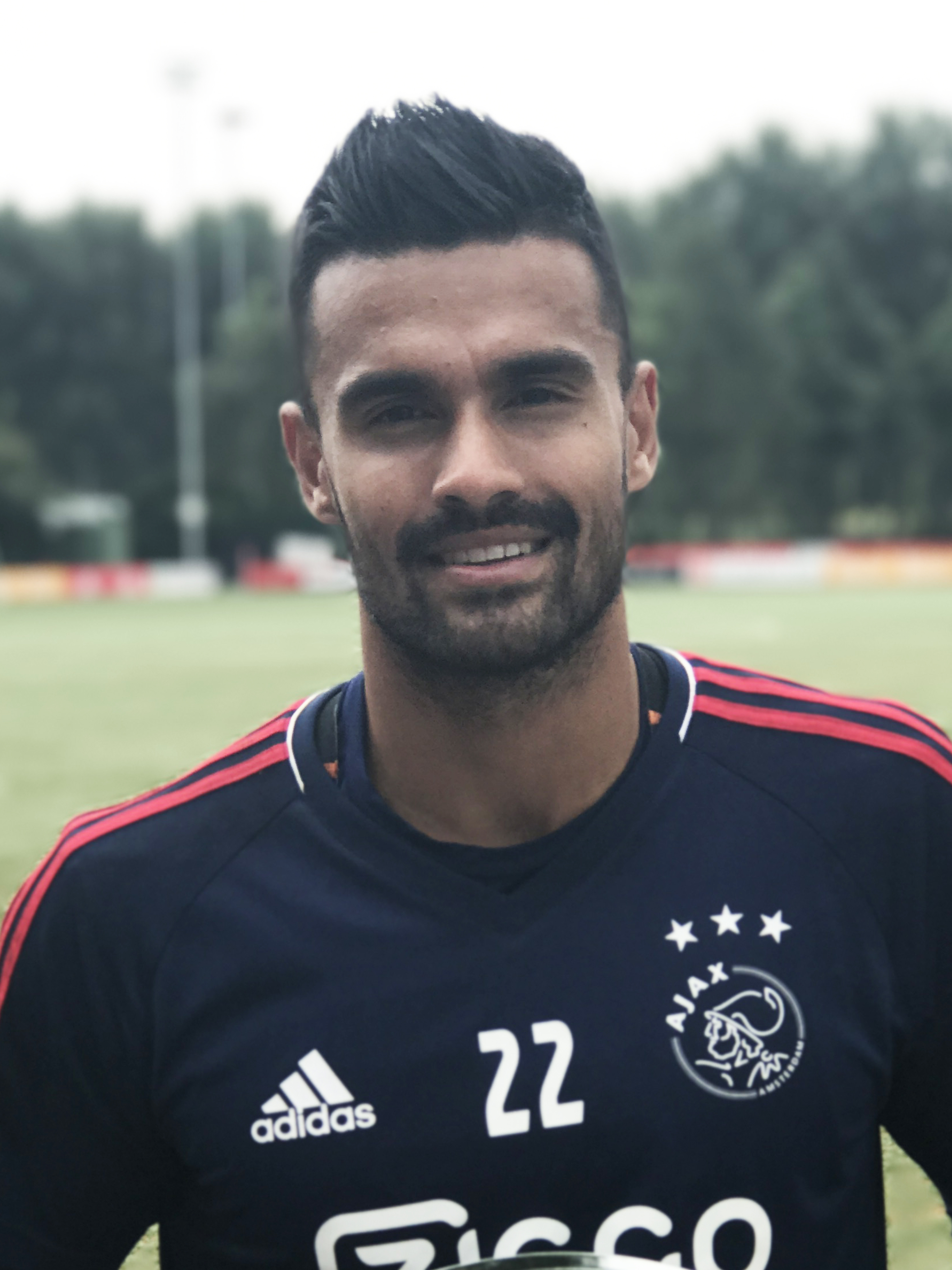
- Van Leer with Ajax

Personal information
- Date of birth: 9 April 1992 (age 34)
- Place of birth: Nieuwegein, Netherlands
- Height: 1.87 m (6 ft 2 in)
- Position: Goalkeeper

Youth career
- Elinkwijk
- PSV

Senior career*
Years	Team	Apps	(Gls)
2012–2013	→ FC Eindhoven (loan)	0	(0)
2013–2014	Jong PSV	14	(0)
2014–2017	Roda JC	70	(0)
2017–2020	Ajax	0	(0)
2017–2020	Jong Ajax	2	(0)
2018–2019	→ NAC (loan)	31	(0)
2020–2022	Sparta Rotterdam	8	(0)
- * Club domestic league appearances and goals

Benjamin van Leer (born 9 April 1992) is a retired Dutch professional footballer who played as a goalkeeper. He formerly played for Jong PSV, Roda JC Kerkrade, Ajax and Sparta Rotterdam.

== Career ==
In June 2017, Van Leer joined Ajax on a four-year contract from Roda JC Kerkrade. The transfer fee paid to Kerkrade was reported as €700,000.

On 30 June 2020, van Leer signed a two-year contract with Sparta Rotterdam. In June 2023, after a year without club, Van Leer's partner, Lieke Martens, confirmed in an interview that he had retired from football.

== Personal life ==
Born in Nieuwegein, Netherlands, Van Leer is of Moluccan descent.

On 13 June 2023, he married fellow professional footballer Lieke Martens in Málaga, Spain after a five-year relationship. On 19 August 2024, Martens publicly announced that the couple was expecting their first child.

== Career statistics ==
As of 1 July 2019

Appearances and goals by club, season and competition
Club	Season	League			Cup		Europe		Other (Note: Includes appearance in Eredivisie play-off)		Total	
Club	Season	Division	Apps	Goals	Apps	Goals	Apps	Goals	Apps	Goals	Apps	Goals
FC Eindhoven	2012–13	Eerste Divisie	0	0	0	0	–		–		0	0
Jong PSV	2013–14	Eerste Divisie	14	0	–		–		–		14	0
Roda JC Kerkrade	2014–15	Eerste Divisie	2	0	4	0	–		3	0	9	0
Roda JC Kerkrade	2015–16	Eredivisie	34	0	4	0	–		–		38	0
Roda JC Kerkrade	2016–17	Eredivisie	34	0	0	0	–		4	0	38	0
Roda JC Kerkrade	Total		70	0	8	0	–		7	0	85	0
Ajax	2017–18	Eredivisie	0	0	1	0	0	0	0	0	1	0
Jong Ajax	2017–18	Eerste Divisie	2	0	–		–		–		2	0
NAC Breda	2018–19	Eredivisie	31	0	1	0	0	0	0	0	32	0
Sparta Rotterdam	2020-21	Eredivisie	6	0	0	0	0	0	0	0	6	0
Sparta Rotterdam	2021-22	Eredivisie	2	0	0	0	0	0	0	0	2	0
Career total			125	0	10	0	0	0	7	0	142	0

== Honours ==
Jong Ajax

- Eerste Divisie: 2017–18

Ajax

- Johan Cruyff Shield: 2019
