= 2016–17 SBV Vitesse season =

Vitesse
2016–17 season
- Chairman: Bert Roetert
- Manager: Henk Fraser
- Eredivisie: 5th
- KNVB Cup: Winners
- Top goalscorer: League: Ricky van Wolfswinkel (20 goals); All: Ricky van Wolfswinkel (23 goals)
- Highest home attendance: 21,000 vs Feyenoord (23 April 2017)
- Lowest home attendance: 5,196 vs RKC Waalwijk (26 October 2016)
- Average home league attendance: 14,442
Home colours	Away colours	Third colours

During the 2016–17 season Vitesse participated in the Dutch Eredivisie and the KNVB Cup. Vitesse would win the final of the KNVB Cup against AZ on 30 April 2017. It was the club's first major honour in their 120 plus year history.

== Players ==
=== Squad details ===
As of 14 May 2017

No.	name.	Pos.	Nat.	Place of birth	Date of birth (age)	Club caps	Club goals	Int. apps	Int. goals	Signed from	Date signed	Fee	Contract End
Goalkeepers
1	Eloy Room	GK	(Curaçao)	Nijmegen (Netherlands)	6 February 1989 (age 37)	155	0	11	0	Academy	1 July 2008	Free	30 June 2018
23	Michael Tørnes	GK	(Denmark)	Herlev	8 January 1986 (age 40)	3	0	–	–	OB (Denmark)	27 July 2016	Free	30 June 2018
24	Jeroen Houwen	GK	(Netherlands)	Venray	18 February 1996 (age 30)	–	–	–	–	Academy	1 July 2013	Free	30 June 2018
40	Wouter Dronkers	GK	(Netherlands)	Vlaardingen	3 May 1993 (age 33)	–	–	–	–	Academy	4 August 2014	Free	30 June 2017
Defenders
3	Maikel van der Werff	CB/RB/LB	(Netherlands)	Hoorn	22 April 1989 (age 37)	48	0	–	–	PEC Zwolle	19 February 2015	Free	30 June 2019
5	Kelvin Leerdam	LB/DM/CB	(Netherlands)	Paramaribo (Suriname)	24 June 1990 (age 36)	106	13	–	–	Feyenoord	2 July 2013	Free	30 June 2017
6	Arnold Kruiswijk	CB	(Netherlands)	Groningen	2 November 1984 (age 42)	71	1	–	–	Heerenveen	19 May 2014	Free	30 June 2017
17	Kevin Diks	RB	(Netherlands)	Apeldoorn	6 October 1996 (age 30)	75	2	–	–	Fiorentina (Italy)	31 January 2017	Loan	30 June 2017
19	Matt Miazga	CB	(United States)	Clifton	19 July 1995 (age 31)	29	1	2	0	Chelsea (England)	31 August 2016	Loan	30 June 2017
22	Thomas Oude Kotte	CB	(Netherlands)	Apeldoorn	20 March 1996 (age 30)	2	0	–	–	Academy	1 July 2015	Free	30 June 2018
28	Alexander Büttner	LB/RB/LM	(Netherlands)	Doetinchem	11 February 1989 (age 37)	130	10	–	–	Dynamo Moscow (Russia)	16 January 2017	Free	30 June 2019
29	Julian Lelieveld	RB/CB	(Netherlands)	Arnhem	24 November 1997 (age 28)	2	0	–	–	Academy	29 July 2015	Free	30 June 2020
37	Guram Kashia (c)	CB/RB	(Georgia (country))	Tbilisi	4 July 1987 (age 39)	250	20	52	1	Dinamo Tbilisi (Georgia (country))	31 August 2010	€ 300K	30 June 2020
43	Lassana Faye	LB	(Netherlands)	Rotterdam	15 June 1998 (age 28)	3	0	–	–	Academy	1 January 2016	Free	30 June 2018
Midfielders
7	Milot Rashica	AM/RW/LW	(Kosovo)	Vushtrri	28 June 1996 (age 30)	73	12	5	0	Kosova Vushtrri (Kosovo)	10 February 2015	€ 300K	30 June 2018
8	Mukhtar Ali	DM/CM	(England)	Mogadishu (Somalia)	30 October 1997 (age 29)	6	0	–	–	Chelsea (England)	29 January 2017	Loan	30 June 2017
10	Adnane Tighadouini	LW/RW	(Morocco)	Ede (Netherlands)	30 November 1992 (age 33)	34	8	1	0	Málaga (Spain)	30 August 2016	Loan	30 June 2017
11	Nathan	LW/RW/AM	(Brazil)	Blumenau	13 March 1996 (age 30)	51	7	–	–	Chelsea (England)	1 July 2015	Loan	30 June 2017
16	Mitchell van Bergen	RW/LW/AM	(Netherlands)	Oss	27 August 1999 (age 27)	20	0	–	–	Academy	17 December 2015	Free	30 June 2020
18	Marvelous Nakamba	CM/DM/LB	(Zimbabwe)	Hwange	19 January 1994 (age 32)	77	3	6	0	Nancy (France)	13 August 2014	Free	30 June 2018
20	Mohammed Osman	AM/LW	(Netherlands)	Qamishli (Syria)	1 January 1994 (age 32)	6	0	–	–	Academy	30 March 2015	Free	30 June 2018
25	Navarone Foor	AM/RW/LW	(Netherlands)	Opheusden	4 February 1992 (age 34)	34	6	–	–	NEC	1 July 2016	Free	30 June 2020
30	Arshak Koryan	RW/LW	(Russia)	Sochi	17 June 1995 (age 31)	5	1	–	–	Lokomotiv Moscow (Russia)	1 July 2015	Free	30 June 2017
34	Lewis Baker	CM/AM	(England)	Luton	25 April 1995 (age 31)	73	20	–	–	Chelsea (England)	1 July 2015	Loan	30 June 2017
41	Julian Calor	CM/AM/DM	(Netherlands)	Gorinchem	27 January 1997 (age 29)	2	0	–	–	RKC Waalwijk	1 July 2016	Free	30 June 2019
Forwards
9	Zhang Yuning	ST/SS	(China)	Wenzhou	5 January 1997 (age 29)	27	4	8	2	Hangzhou (China)	1 July 2015	Free	30 June 2018
13	Ricky van Wolfswinkel	ST	(Netherlands)	Woudenberg	27 January 1989 (age 37)	72	31	2	0	Norwich City (England)	28 July 2016	€ 600K	30 June 2019

== Transfers ==
=== In ===
No.	Pos.	Nat.	Name	Age	EU	Moving from	Type	Transfer window	Ends	Transfer fee	Source
9	FW	(China)	Zhang Yuning	20	Non-EU	Youth system	Promoted ✓	Summer	2017	Free	
16	MF	(Netherlands)	Mitchell van Bergen	16	EU	Youth system	Promoted ✓	Summer	2018	Free	
22	DF	(Netherlands)	Thomas Oude Kotte	20	EU	Youth system	Promoted ✓	Summer	2018	Free	
24	GK	(Netherlands)	Jeroen Houwen	20	EU	Youth system	Promoted ✓	Summer	2018	Free	
29	DF	(Netherlands)	Julian Lelieveld	17	EU	Youth system	Promoted ✓	Summer	2020	Free	
30	MF	(Russia)	Arshak Koryan	21	EU	Youth system	Promoted ✓	Summer	2017	Free	
14	FW	(Nigeria)	Abiola Dauda	28	Non-EU	Heart of Midlothian (Scotland)	Loan Return ✓	Summer	2017	Free	
25	MF	(Netherlands)	Navarone Foor	24	EU	NEC	Transfer ✓	Summer	2020	Free	
—	FW	(Netherlands)	Martijn Berden	18	EU	PSV	Transfer ✓	Summer	2018	Free	
41	MF	(Netherlands)	Julian Calor	19	EU	RKC Waalwijk	Transfer ✓	Summer	2019	Free	
11	MF	(Brazil)	Nathan	20	Non-EU	Chelsea (England)	Loan ✓	Summer	2017	Free	
34	MF	(England)	Lewis Baker	21	EU	Chelsea (England)	Loan ✓	Summer	2017	Free	
23	GK	(Denmark)	Michael Tørnes	30	EU	OB (Denmark)	Transfer ✓	Summer	2018	Free	
13	FW	(Netherlands)	Ricky van Wolfswinkel	27	EU	Norwich City (England)	Transfer ✓	Summer	2019	€600K	
10	MF	(Morocco)	Adnane Tighadouini	23	Non-EU	Málaga (Spain)	Loan ✓	Summer	2017	Free	
19	DF	(United States)	Matt Miazga	21	Non-EU	Chelsea (England)	Loan ✓	Summer	2017	Free	
28	DF	(Netherlands)	Alexander Büttner	27	EU	Dynamo Moscow (Russia)	Transfer ✓	Winter	2019	Free	
8	MF	(England)	Mukhtar Ali	19	EU	Chelsea (England)	Loan ✓	Winter	2017	Free	
17	DF	(Netherlands)	Kevin Diks	20	EU	Fiorentina (Italy)	Loan ✓	Winter	2017	Free	

Total spending: ▼€600,000

=== Out ===
No.	Pos.	Nat.	Name	Age	EU	Moving to	Type	Transfer window	Transfer fee	Source
11	MF	(Ukraine)	Denys Oliynyk	29	Non-EU	Darmstadt 98 (Germany)	Contract Ended ✓	Summer	Free	
22	GK	(Netherlands)	Piet Velthuizen	29	EU	Hapoel Haifa (Israel)	Contract Ended ✓	Summer	Free	
40	MF	(Netherlands)	Elmo Lieftink	22	EU	Willem II	Contract Ended ✓	Summer	Free	
—	FW	(Netherlands)	Kai Huisman	21	EU	FC Emmen	Contract Ended ✓	Summer	Free	
7	FW	(England)	Isaiah Brown	19	EU	Chelsea (England)	Loan Return ✓	Summer	Free	
9	FW	(England)	Dominic Solanke	18	EU	Chelsea (England)	Loan Return ✓	Summer	Free	
13	MF	(Brazil)	Nathan	20	Non-EU	Chelsea (England)	Loan Return ✓	Summer	Free	
20	MF	(Serbia)	Danilo Pantić	19	Non-EU	Chelsea (England)	Loan Return ✓	Summer	Free	
34	MF	(England)	Lewis Baker	21	EU	Chelsea (England)	Loan Return ✓	Summer	Free	
30	MF	(Ecuador)	Renato Ibarra	25	Non-EU	América (Mexico)	Transfer ✓	Summer	€1.8M	
17	DF	(Netherlands)	Kevin Diks	19	EU	Fiorentina (Italy)	Transfer ✓	Summer	€2.8M	
10	MF	(Georgia (country))	Valeri Qazaishvili	23	EU	Legia Warsaw (Poland)	Loan ✓	Summer	Free	
8	DF	(Japan)	Kosuke Ota	29	Non-EU	FC Tokyo (Japan)	Transfer ✓	Winter	€690K	
14	FW	(Nigeria)	Abiola Dauda	28	Non-EU	Atromitos (Greece)	Transfer ✓	Winter	Free	
21	MF	(Israel)	Sheran Yeini	30	EU	Maccabi Tel Aviv (Israel)	Transfer ✓	Winter	Undisclosed	

Total gaining: ▲€5,290,000

Balance

Total: ▲€4,690,000

== Pre-season ==
On 21 June 2016, it was announced that Vitesse would host Belgian side Oostende for a pre-season friendly, as well as hosting the 2016 Fox Sports Cup, which features sides such as West Bromwich Albion and Porto.

2 July 2016 Friendly	Vitesse	2–0	Shakhtar Donetsk	Loenen, Netherlands
17:00	Zhang 20' van Bergen 57'; Lucassen (yellow card) 59'	Report		Stadium: Loenermark; Attendance: 1,000; Referee: Reinold Wiedemeijer

9 July 2016 Friendly	Vitesse	2–3	Oostende	Driel, Netherlands
16:00	Ota 31'; Zhang 87'	Report	7' Canesin; 40' El Ghanassy; 89' Tomašević	Stadium: Sportpark RKSV; Attendance: 1,135; Referee: Jochem Kamphuis

16 July 2016 Friendly	Vitesse	2–1	Rubin Kazan	Murska Sobota, Slovenia
17:30	Zhang 31'; Rashica 49'	Report	58' Karadeniz	Stadium: Fazanerija City Stadium; Attendance: 25

21 July 2016 2016 Fox Sports Cup	Vitesse	1–2	West Bromwich Albion	Arnhem, Netherlands
18:30	Nathan 57'	Report	26' Rondón; 70' McManaman	Stadium: GelreDome; Referee: Reinold Wiedemeijer

23 July 2016 2016 Fox Sports Cup	Vitesse	1–2	Porto	Arnhem, Netherlands
15:30	Baker 17'		78' Corona; 82' (pen.) Silva	Stadium: GelreDome

30 July 2016 Friendly	Newcastle United	3–2	Vitesse	Newcastle upon Tyne, England
15:00	Leerdam 22' (og.); Gayle 36'; Colback 41'	Report	Nathan 53'; Kashia 61'	Stadium: St James' Park; Referee: Sebastian Stockbridge

== Competitions ==
=== Overview ===
Competition	Record							
Competition	G	W	D	L	GF	GA	GD	Win %
Eredivisie	34	15	6	13	51	40	+11	44.12
KNVB Cup	6	6	0	0	21	4	+17	100.00
Total	40	21	6	13	72	44	+28	52.50

Updated to match played 14 May 2017
Source: Competitions

=== Eredivisie ===
==== League table ====
Pos	Team	Pld	W	D	L	GF	GA	GD	Pts	Qualification or relegation
3	PSV Eindhoven	34	22	10	2	68	23	+45	76	Qualification for the Europa League third qualifying round
4	Utrecht (O)	34	18	8	8	54	38	+16	62	Qualification for the European competition play-offs (Note: Four teams played for a spot in the Europa League second qualifying round.)
5	Vitesse	34	15	6	13	51	40	+11	51	Qualification for the Europa League group stage (Note: Vitesse qualified for the Europa League group stage by winning the 2016–17 KNVB Cup.)
6	AZ	34	12	13	9	56	52	+4	49	Qualification for the European competition play-offs
7	Twente (Note: Twente was excluded from European football for 3 years on 15 December 2015.)	34	12	9	13	48	50	−2	45	

Source: NUsport (in Dutch), Soccerway
Rules for classification: 1) Points; 2) Goal difference; 3) Goals scored; 4) Play-off (only for deciding champion and relegation); 5) Head-to-head points; 6) Head-to-head goal difference; 7) Head-to-head away goals scored; 8) Draw. (Note: Criteria 5-8 is only used if deciding Europa League play-off places)
(O) Play-off winners

==== Results summary ====
Overall								Home						Away					
Pld	W	D	L	GF	GA	GD	Pts	W	D	L	GF	GA	GD	W	D	L	GF	GA	GD
34	15	6	13	51	40	+11	51	9	2	6	31	21	+10	6	4	7	20	19	+1

Last updated: 14 May 2017.
Source: Eredivisie

==== Results by matchday ====
Matchday	1	2	3	4	5	6	7	8	9	10	11	12	13	14	15	16	17	18	19	20	21	22	23	24	25	26	27	28	29	30	31	32	33	34
Ground	A	H	A	H	A	H	A	H	A	A	H	H	A	H	H	A	A	H	A	H	A	H	H	A	A	H	A	H	A	H	A	H	A	H
Result	W	L	W	D	L	W	L	W	D	D	L	L	D	D	W	W	L	W	D	W	W	L	L	W	L	W	L	W	W	W	L	L	L	W
Position	2	5	4	4	8	6	7	6	6	7	7	9	8	8	7	6	8	7	7	7	6	6	8	7	8	5	7	5	5	5	5	6	6	5

Updated to match(es) played on 14 May 2017. Source: Vitesse
A = Away; H = Home; W = Win; D = Draw; L = Loss

==== Matches ====
Win Draw Loss

The fixtures for the 2016–17 season were announced on 21 June 2016 at 9am.

6 August 2016 1	Willem II	1–4	Vitesse	Tilburg
20:45 CET	Sol 54'	Report	21' van Wolfswinkel; 30' Qazaishvili; 37', 39' Nathan; (yellow card) 70' Baker	Stadium: Koning Willem II Stadion; Attendance: 12,250; Referee: Allard Lindhout

13 August 2016 2	Vitesse	1–2	ADO Den Haag	Arnhem
20:45 CET	van Wolfswinkel 22'; Kruiswijk (yellow card) 90+3'	Report	31', 61' Kastaneer; (yellow card) 59' Duplan	Stadium: GelreDome; Attendance: 11,615; Referee: Kevin Blom

20 August 2016 3	Roda JC	0–1	Vitesse	Kerkrade
18:30 CET	Kum (yellow card) 35'; Brouwers (yellow card) 44'; Rutjes (yellow card) 60'	Report	22' Baker; (yellow card) 39' Kruiswijk; (yellow card) 77' Nakamba; (yellow card) 84' van der Werff	Stadium: Parkstad Limburg Stadion; Attendance: 13,030; Referee: Danny Makkelie

26 August 2016 4	Vitesse	1–1	Utrecht	Arnhem
20:00 CET	van Wolfswinkel 28'; Leerdam (yellow card) 90+1'		(yellow card) 24' Ludwig; 68' Haller	Stadium: GelreDome; Attendance: 14,000; Referee: Björn Kuipers

11 September 2016 5	Ajax	1–0	Vitesse	Amsterdam
16:45 CET	Viergever (yellow card) 27', (goal) 55'	Report	(yellow card) 44' (yellow-red card) 67' Kruiswijk	Stadium: Amsterdam Arena; Attendance: 46,000; Referee: Richard Liesveld

17 September 2016 6	Vitesse	2–0	Go Ahead Eagles	Arnhem
19:45 CET	van Wolfswinkel 76' (pen.); Baker 78'	Report	(yellow card) 32' de Kogel; (yellow card) 34' Ritzmaier	Stadium: GelreDome; Attendance: 14,170; Referee: Jochem Kamphuis

25 September 2016 7	Twente	2–1	Vitesse	Enschede
14:30 CET	Ünal 16'; Trajkovski (yellow card) 45+3'; Celina 85'	Report	(yellow card) 59' Nakamba; 90+2' Baker	Stadium: De Grolsch Veste; Attendance: 22,900; Referee: Jeroen Manschot

1 October 2016 8	Vitesse	2–1	Groningen	Arnhem
18:30 CET	Rashica (yellow card) 4'; Tighadouini (yellow card) 25'; Baker 44'; Leerdam 76'	Report	4' (pen.) Hoesen; (yellow card) 43' Davidson	Stadium: GelreDome; Attendance: 15,055; Referee: Reinold Wiedemeijer

15 October 2016 9	AZ	2–2	Vitesse	Alkmaar
20:45 CET	van Eijden (yellow card) 22'; Weghorst (yellow card) 57'; Mühren 78', 87'	Report	23' Baker; (yellow card) 28' Nakamba; 58' (pen.) van Wolfswinkel; (yellow card) 82' Leerdam; (yellow card) 90' van Bergen	Stadium: AFAS Stadion; Attendance: 15,415; Referee: Serdar Gözübüyük

23 October 2016 10	NEC Nijmegen	1–1	Vitesse	Nijmegen
12:30 CET	Bikel (yellow card) 22'; Golla (yellow card) 42'; Dumić (yellow card) 63', (goal) 88'	Report	38' Foor; (yellow card) 43' van Wolfswinkel; (yellow card) 63' Kashia; (yellow card) 89' Tighadouini	Stadium: Stadion de Goffert; Attendance: 12,100; Referee: Pol van Boekel

29 October 2016 11	Vitesse	0–2	PSV	Arnhem
19:45 CET	Kruiswijk (yellow card) 53'	Report	12', 90+3' Pereiro	Stadium: GelreDome; Attendance: 18,452; Referee: Björn Kuipers

6 November 2016 12	Vitesse	1–2	Heracles Almelo	Arnhem
14:30 CET	van Wolfswinkel 57'; Yeini (yellow card) 78'	Report	61' Darri; 74' (pen.) Armenteros	Stadium: GelreDome; Attendance: 13,743; Referee: Danny Makkelie

19 November 2016 13	Heerenveen	1–1	Vitesse	Heerenveen
18:30 CET	Thorsby (yellow card) 61'; Mulder (yellow card) 73'; Veerman 84'	Report	(yellow card) 57' Nakamba; 72' Baker	Stadium: Abe Lenstra Stadion; Attendance: 24,465; Referee: Ed Janssen

26 November 2016 14	Vitesse	2–2	Excelsior	Arnhem
18:30 CET	van Wolfswinkel 25' (pen.); Tighadouini 73'	Report	7', 14' Faik; (yellow card) 24' Mattheij; (yellow card) 40' Vermeulen; (yellow card) 56' Kuipers	Stadium: GelreDome; Attendance: 14,328; Referee: Siemen Mulder

3 December 2016 15	Vitesse	3–1	PEC Zwolle	Arnhem
20:45 CET	Rashica (yellow card) 21'; Baker 32' (pen.); Zhang 41', (yellow card) 45'; Nathan 90+2'	Report	(yellow card) 31' Marcellis; 67' Schenkeveld; (yellow card) 74' Kvída	Stadium: GelreDome; Attendance: 14,173; Referee: Jochem Kamphuis

11 December 2016 16	Sparta Rotterdam	0–1	Vitesse	Rotterdam
12:30 CET	Dijkstra (yellow card) 62'; Dougall (yellow card) 90+2'; Spierings (red card) 90+3'	Report	83' van Wolfswinkel; (yellow card) 89' Zhang; (yellow card) 90+4' Foor	Stadium: Sparta Stadion Het Kasteel; Attendance: 10,353; Referee: Allard Lindhout

17 December 2016 17	Feyenoord	3–1	Vitesse	Rotterdam
19:45 CET	Elia 15'; Berghuis 42', 57'; Nelom (yellow card) 51'; El Ahmadi (yellow card) 63'	Report	24' Tighadouini; (yellow card) 74' van Wolfswinkel	Stadium: De Kuip; Referee: Dennis Higler

15 January 2017 18	Vitesse	3–1	Twente	Arnhem
14:30 CET	Baker 13', (red card) 81' van Wolfswinkel 39'; Rashica 47'; Leerdam (yellow card) 77'	Report	(yellow card) 64', (goal) 77' (pen.) Klich; (yellow card) 86' Seys	Stadium: GelreDome; Attendance: 15,194; Referee: Ed Janssen

21 January 2017 19	Groningen	1–1	Vitesse	Groningen
19:45 CET	Leerdam 6' (og.); Hateboer (yellow card) 90+2'	Report	49', (red card) 86' Foor	Stadium: Euroborg; Referee: Jeroen Manschot

29 January 2017 20	Vitesse	2–1	AZ	Arnhem
14:30 CET	Baker 10', (yellow card) 61'; Leerdam (yellow card) 39'; Nathan 51'; Zhang (yellow card) 75'	Report	(yellow card) 41' van Eijden; (yellow card) 45+1' Weghorst; (yellow card) 51' Haps; 64' (og.) Kashia	Stadium: GelreDome; Attendance: 14,183; Referee: Jochem Kamphuis

3 February 2017 21	ADO Den Haag	0–2	Vitesse	The Hague
20:00 CET	Wolters (yellow card) 52'; Gorter (yellow card) 61'; Kanon (yellow card) 88'	Report	29' Tighadouini; 31' van Wolfswinkel	Stadium: Kyocera Stadion; Attendance: 11,343; Referee: Siemen Mulder

11 February 2017 22	Vitesse	0–2	Willem II	Arnhem
20:45 CET	Leerdam (yellow card) 75'; Diks (yellow card) 81'	Report	(yellow card) 70' Tshimanga; (yellow card) 80', (goal) 84' Koppers; 90+4', (yellow card) 90+5' Oularé	Stadium: GelreDome; Attendance: 14,879; Referee: Martin van den Kerkhof

19 February 2017 23	Vitesse	0–1	Ajax	Arnhem
14:30 CET	Diks (yellow card) 54'; Miazga (yellow card) 88'	Report	26' Klaassen; (yellow card) 36' Viergever; (yellow card) 67' Kluivert	Stadium: GelreDome; Attendance: 20,016; Referee: Kevin Blom

26 February 2017 24	Go Ahead Eagles	1–3	Vitesse	Deventer
12:30 CET	Duits (yellow card) 59'; Manu (yellow card) 59'; Ritzmaier (yellow card) 67'; Crowley 88'; Maatsen (yellow card) 90+3'	Report	(yellow card) 23', (goal) 29' van Wolfswinkel; 52' Foor; 80' Rashica	Stadium: De Adelaarshorst; Attendance: 9,412; Referee: Jochem Kamphuis

4 March 2017 25	PEC Zwolle	3–1	Vitesse	Zwolle
20:45 CET	Saymak 10'; Brock-Madsen 18'; Holla 55'	Report	48' van Wolfswinkel; (yellow card) 54' Miazga	Stadium: MAC³PARK Stadion; Attendance: 13,000; Referee: Allard Lindhout

10 March 2017 26	Vitesse	5–0	Sparta Rotterdam	Arnhem
20:00 CET	van Wolfswinkel 22'; Foor 34'; Kruiswijk 40'; Nakamba 45'; Kashia 61'	Report	(yellow card) 43' Goodwin	Stadium: GelreDome; Attendance: 13,852; Referee: Jeroen Manschot

18 March 2017 27	PSV	1–0	Vitesse	Eindhoven
18:45 CET	de Jong 50'	Report	(yellow card) 40' Diks; (yellow card) 72' Miazga; (yellow card) 83' Büttner	Stadium: Philips Stadion; Attendance: 33,900; Referee: Björn Kuipers

2 April 2017 28	Vitesse	2–1	NEC Nijmegen	Arnhem
12:30 CET	van Wolfswinkel 51', 84' (pen.); Diks (yellow card) 69'; Kruiswijk (yellow card) 82'; Büttner (yellow card) 90'	Report	(yellow card) 28' Breinburg; 66' Kadioglu; (yellow card) 76' Golla	Stadium: GelreDome; Attendance: 16,654; Referee: Serdar Gözübüyük

5 April 2017 29	Heracles Almelo	0–1	Vitesse	Almelo
18:30 CET	Pröpper (yellow card) 51' (yellow-red card) 56'; Kuwas (yellow card) 71'	Report	(yellow card) 29' (yellow-red card) 86' Diks; 43' Foor; (yellow card) 90+4' Nathan	Stadium: Polman Stadion; Attendance: 10,711; Referee: Christiaan Bax

8 April 2017 30	Vitesse	4–2	Heerenveen	Arnhem
18:30 CET	Foor 5' van Wolfswinkel 14', 70', 75'	Report	(yellow card) 17' Marzo; 31' Slagveer; 89' Larsson	Stadium: GelreDome; Attendance: 21,128; Referee: Jochem Kamphuis

15 April 2017 31	Excelsior	1–0	Vitesse	Rotterdam
18:45 CET	Hasselbaink 13'; Mattheij (yellow card) 62'	Report	(yellow card) 90+4' van Wolfswinkel	Stadium: Stadion Woudestein; Attendance: 4,165; Referee: Ed Janssen

23 April 2017 32	Vitesse	0–2	Feyenoord	Arnhem
14:30 CET		Report	10', 28' Jørgensen	Stadium: GelreDome; Attendance: 21,000; Referee: Pol van Boekel

7 May 2017 33	Utrecht	1–0	Vitesse	Utrecht
14:30 CET	Janssen 90+2'	Report		Stadium: Stadion Galgenwaard; Attendance: 20,686; Referee: Allard Lindhout

14 May 2017 34	Vitesse	3–0	Roda JC	Arnhem
14:30 CET	van Wolfswinkel 3', 80'; Baker 90+3'	Report	(yellow card) 49' Ajagun; (yellow card) 67' Werker; (yellow card) 77' Papazoglou; (red card) 82' Paulissen	Stadium: GelreDome; Attendance: 19,876; Referee: Bas Nijhuis

=== KNVB Cup ===
22 September 2016 First round	ASV De Dijk	2–7	Vitesse	Amsterdam
20:00 CET	Zwarthoed 41'; Schilder (yellow card) 63'; Kaars 67'	Report	9' Baker; 34' Leerdam; 59' (pen.) van Wolfswinkel; 60', 64' Tighadouini; 84' Rashica; 86' Koryan	Stadium: Sportpark Schellingwoude; Attendance: 1,200; Referee: Kevin Blom

26 October 2016 Second round	Vitesse	4–1	RKC Waalwijk	Arnhem
20:00 CET	Yeini (yellow card) 14'; Zhang 19'; Kashia (yellow card) 53'; Baker 59' (pen.), (yellow card) 90+1'; Nakamba 69'; Nathan 90+3'	Report	Langedijk 53'; Greene (yellow card) 58'	Stadium: GelreDome; Attendance: 5,196; Referee: Dennis Higler

14 December 2016 Third round	Vitesse	4–0	Jodan Boys	Arnhem
20:00 CET	Miazga 14'; Tighadouini 17'; Baker 52' (pen.); Rashica 56'	Report	(red card) 51' Marengo; (yellow card) 79' Bellahcen	Stadium: GelreDome; Attendance: 7,257; Referee: Edwin van de Graaf

26 January 2017 Quarter final	Vitesse	2–0	Feyenoord	Arnhem
20:45 CET	van der Werff (yellow card) 44'; Kashia 55'; Tighadounini 61'; Rashica (yellow card) 80'; Leerdam (yellow card) 88' van Wolfswinkel (yellow card) 90+1'	Report	(yellow card) 41' Berghuis; (yellow card) 51' Elia; (yellow card) 54' Botteghin	Stadium: GelreDome; Attendance: 15,673; Referee: Danny Makkelie

1 March 2017 Semi final	Sparta Rotterdam	1–2	Vitesse	Rotterdam
20:45 CET	Kashia 74' (og.)	Report	13', 73' Baker	Stadium: Sparta Stadion Het Kasteel; Attendance: 10,349; Referee: Pol van Boekel

30 April 2017 Final	AZ	0–2	Vitesse	Rotterdam
18:00 CET	Luckassen (yellow card) 77'	Report	(yellow card) 77', (goal) 81', 88' van Wolfswinkel	Stadium: De Kuip; Attendance: 46,105; Referee: Danny Makkelie

== Statistics ==
=== Appearances ===
No.	Pos.	Name	Eredivisie		KNVB Cup		Total		Discipline	
No.	Pos.	Name	Apps	Goals	Apps	Goals	Apps	Goals	Yellow card	Red card
1	GK	(Curaçao) Eloy Room	33	0	5	0	38	0	0	0
3	DF	(Netherlands) Maikel van der Werff	16 (1)	0	2 (1)	0	18 (2)	0	2	0
5	DF	(Netherlands) Kelvin Leerdam	25 (3)	1	5	1	30 (3)	2	6	0
6	DF	(Netherlands) Arnold Kruiswijk	24 (3)	1	4	0	28 (3)	1	5	1
7	MF	(Kosovo) Milot Rashica	31 (2)	2	6	2	37 (2)	4	3	0
8	MF	(England) Mukhtar Ali	0 (6)	0	0	0	0 (6)	0	0	0
9	FW	(China) Zhang Yuning	2 (14)	1	2 (1)	1	4 (15)	2	3	0
10	MF	(Morocco) Adnane Tighadouini	17 (8)	3	4 (2)	4	21 (10)	7	2	0
11	MF	(Brazil) Nathan	19 (8)	4	2 (3)	1	21 (11)	5	2	0
13	FW	(Netherlands) Ricky van Wolfswinkel	32	20	4 (1)	3	36 (1)	23	7	0
16	MF	(Netherlands) Mitchell van Bergen	2 (15)	0	0 (2)	0	2 (17)	0	1	0
17	DF	(Netherlands) Kevin Diks	11	0	0 (1)	0	11 (1)	0	5	1
18	MF	(Zimbabwe) Marvelous Nakamba	31	1	5	1	36	2	4	0
19	DF	(United States) Matt Miazga	15 (8)	0	4 (2)	1	19 (10)	1	3	0
20	MF	(Netherlands) Mohammed Osman	0 (3)	0	1 (1)	0	1 (4)	0	0	0
22	DF	(Netherlands) Thomas Oude Kotte	0	0	0	0	0	0	0	0
23	GK	(Denmark) Michael Tørnes	1 (1)	0	1	0	2 (1)	0	0	0
24	GK	(Netherlands) Jeroen Houwen	0	0	0	0	0	0	0	0
25	MF	(Netherlands) Navarone Foor	26 (3)	6	5	0	31 (3)	6	1	1
28	DF	(Netherlands) Alexander Büttner	2 (8)	0	0 (1)	0	2 (9)	0	2	0
29	DF	(Netherlands) Julian Lelieveld	0	0	0	0	0	0	0	0
30	MF	(Russia) Arshak Koryan	1 (2)	0	0 (2)	1	1 (4)	1	0	0
34	MF	(England) Lewis Baker	33	10	6	5	39	15	3	1
37	DF	(Georgia (country)) Guram Kashia	34	1	5	1	39	2	2	0
40	GK	(Netherlands) Wouter Dronkers	0	0	0	0	0	0	0	0
41	MF	(Netherlands) Julian Calor	1	0	1	0	2	0	0	0
43	DF	(Netherlands) Lassana Faye	1 (1)	0	1	0	2 (1)	0	0	0
Players who left the club in August/January transfer window or on loan
14	FW	(Nigeria) Abiola Dauda	0 (1)	0	0	0	0 (1)	0	0	0
21	MF	(Israel) Sheran Yeini	8 (2)	0	1	0	9 (2)	0	2	0
—	DF	(Japan) Kosuke Ota	7 (3)	0	2	0	9 (3)	0	0	0
—	MF	(Georgia (country)) Valeri Qazaishvili	2 (1)	1	0	0	2 (1)	1	0	0

Last updated: 14 May 2017.
Source: Vitesse

=== Top scorers ===
The list is sorted by shirt number when total goals are equal.

Rnk	Pos	No.	Player	Eredivisie	KNVB Cup	Total
1	FW	13	(Netherlands) Ricky van Wolfswinkel	20	3	23
2	MF	34	(England) Lewis Baker	10	5	15
3	MF	10	(Morocco) Adnane Tighadouini	3	4	7
4	MF	25	(Netherlands) Navarone Foor	6	0	6
5	MF	11	(Brazil) Nathan	4	1	5
6	MF	7	(Kosovo) Milot Rashica	2	2	4
7	DF	5	(Netherlands) Kelvin Leerdam	1	1	2
7	FW	9	(China) Zhang Yuning	1	1	2
7	MF	18	(Zimbabwe) Marvelous Nakamba	1	1	2
7	DF	37	(Georgia (country)) Guram Kashia	1	1	2
11	DF	6	(Netherlands) Arnold Kruiswijk	1	0	1
11	DF	19	(United States) Matt Miazga	0	1	1
11	MF	30	(Russia) Arshak Koryan	0	1	1
11	MF	—	(Georgia (country)) Valeri Qazaishvili	1	0	1
Own goals				0	0	0
Total				51	21	72

Last updated: 14 May 2017.
Source: Vitesse

=== Clean sheets ===
The list is sorted by shirt number when total appearances are equal.

Rnk	No.	Player	Eredivisie	KNVB Cup	Total
1	1	(Curaçao) Eloy Room	7	2	9
2	23	(Denmark) Michael Tørnes	0	1	1
Total			7	3	10

Last updated: 14 May 2017.
Source: Vitesse

=== Summary ===
Games played	40 (35 Eredivisie) (5 KNVB Cup)
Games won	21 (15 Eredivisie) (6 KNVB Cup)
Games drawn	6 (6 Eredivisie)
Games lost	13 (13 Eredivisie)
Goals scored	72 (51 Eredivisie) (21 KNVB Cup)
Goals conceded	44 (40 Eredivisie) (4 KNVB Cup)
Goal difference	+28 (+11 Eredivisie) (+17 KNVB Cup)
Clean sheets	10 (7 Eredivisie) (3 KNVB Cup)
Yellow cards	52 (44 Eredivisie) (8 KNVB Cup)
Red cards	4 (4 Eredivisie)
Most appearances	39 appearances (3 players)
Top scorer	(Netherlands) Ricky van Wolfswinkel (23 goals)
Winning Percentage	Overall: 21/40 (52.50%)

Last updated: 14 May 2017.
Source: Vitesse
