= 2014–15 SBV Vitesse season =

Vitesse Arnhem
2014–15 season
- Chairman: Bert Roetert
- Manager: Peter Bosz
- Eredivisie: 5th
- KNVB Cup: Quarter-final
- Top goalscorer: League: Bertrand Traoré (14); All: Bertrand Traoré (17)
Home colours	Away colours	Third colours

During the 2014–15 season, Vitesse Arnhem participated in the Eredivisie and the KNVB Cup. Despite performing well in the previous season, the club failed to qualify for any major European competition.

== Players ==
=== Squad details ===
As of 17 June 2015

No.	Name	Pos.	Nat.	Place of birth	Date of birth (age)	Club caps	Club goals	Int. apps	Int. goals	Signed from	Date signed	Fee	Contract End
Goalkeepers
1	Eloy Room	GK	(Curaçao)	Nijmegen (Netherlands)	6 February 1989 (age 37)	81	0	1	0	Academy	1 July 2008	Free	30 June 2018
22	Piet Velthuizen	GK	(Netherlands)	Nijmegen	3 November 1986 (age 40)	239	0	1	0	Hércules (Spain)	26 July 2011	Free	30 June 2016
48	Jeroen Houwen	GK	(Netherlands)	Venray	18 February 1996 (age 30)	–	–	–	–	Academy	1 July 2013	Free	30 June 2018
Defenders
2	Wallace	RB	(Brazil)	Rio de Janeiro (Rio de Janeiro (state))	1 May 1994 (age 32)	23	1	–	–	Chelsea (England)	30 June 2014	Loan	30 June 2015
3	Dan Mori	CB	(Israel)	Tel Aviv	8 November 1988 (age 38)	25	1	7	0	Bnei Yahuda (Israel)	22 August 2012	Free	30 June 2015
15	Arnold Kruiswijk	CB	(Netherlands)	Groningen	2 November 1984 (age 42)	18	0	–	–	Heerenveen	19 May 2014	Free	30 June 2017
23	Jan-Arie van der Heijden	CB/DM	(Netherlands)	Schoonhoven	3 March 1988 (age 38)	150	8	–	–	Ajax	2 March 2011	Free	30 June 2015
35	Rochdi Achenteh	LB/CM/LW	(Morocco)	Eindhoven (Netherlands)	7 March 1988 (age 38)	48	1	2	0	PEC Zwolle	15 January 2014	Undisc.	30 June 2016
37	Guram Kashia (c)	CB/RB	(Georgia (country))	Tbilisi	4 July 1987 (age 39)	181	13	35	1	Dinamo Tbilisi (Georgia (country))	31 August 2010	€ 300K	30 June 2016
40	Kevin Diks	RB/CB	(Netherlands)	Apeldoorn	6 October 1996 (age 30)	30	0	–	–	Academy	1 July 2014	Free	30 June 2018
Midfielders
5	Kelvin Leerdam	DM/RB	(Netherlands)	Paramaribo (Suriname)	24 June 1990 (age 36)	55	10	–	–	Feyenoord	2 July 2013	Free	30 June 2017
6	Josh McEachran	CM	(England)	Oxford	1 March 1993 (age 33)	14	0	–	–	Chelsea (England)	17 August 2014	Loan	30 June 2015
7	Marko Vejinović	CM	(Netherlands)	Amsterdam	3 February 1990 (age 36)	75	15	–	–	Heracles Almelo	28 June 2013	Free	30 June 2017
8	Valeri Kazaishvili	AM/RW/SS	(Georgia (country))	Ozurgeti	23 January 1993 (age 33)	82	17	6	1	Olimpi (Georgia (country))	9 August 2011	Nominal	30 June 2018
10	Davy Pröpper	CM/AM	(Netherlands)	Arnhem	2 September 1991 (age 35)	162	21	1	0	Academy	1 January 2010	Free	30 June 2017
11	Denys Oliynyk	LW/AM	(Ukraine)	Zaporizhia	16 June 1987 (age 39)	33	4	12	0	Dnipro (Ukraine)	26 May 2014	Free	30 June 2016
18	Marvelous Nakamba	AM/RW/LW	(Zimbabwe)	Hwange	19 January 1994 (age 32)	8	0	–	–	Nancy (France)	13 August 2014	Free	30 June 2018
20	Zakaria Labyad	LW/AM	(Morocco)	Utrecht (Netherlands)	9 March 1993 (age 33)	53	13	4	0	Sporting (Portugal)	9 January 2014	Loan	30 June 2015
25	Gino Bosz	LW/RW	(Netherlands)	Rotterdam	23 April 1993 (age 33)	1	0	–	–	Academy	17 January 2014	Free	30 June 2015
27	Bertrand Traoré	AM/LW/RW	(Burkina Faso)	Bobo-Dioulasso	6 September 1995 (age 31)	51	20	20	2	Chelsea (England)	9 January 2014	Loan	30 June 2015
30	Renato Ibarra	RW	(Ecuador)	Ambuquí	20 January 1991 (age 35)	129	12	24	0	El Nacional (Ecuador)	8 July 2011	€ 2M	30 June 2016
–	Mo Hamdaoui	LW/RW	(Netherlands)	Amsterdam	10 June 1993 (age 33)	–	–	–	–	Academy	29 May 2014	Free	30 June 2016
Forwards
9	Uroš Đurđević	ST	(Serbia)	Belgrade	2 March 1994 (age 32)	25	1	–	–	Rad (Serbia)	7 January 2014	Undisc.	30 June 2018
14	Abiola Dauda	ST	(Nigeria)	Lagos	3 February 1988 (age 38)	18	6	–	–	Red Star (Serbia)	24 July 2014	€ 500K	30 June 2017
–	Arshak Koryan	SS/RW	(Russia)	Sochi	17 June 1995 (age 31)	–	–	–	–	Lokomotiv Moscow (Russia)	3 February 2015	Free	30 June 2015

== Transfers ==
=== In ===
No.	Pos.	Nat.	Name	Age	EU	Moving from	Type	Transfer window	Ends	Transfer fee	Source
44	MF	(Netherlands)	Brahim Darri	19	EU	De Graafschap	Loan Return ✓	Summer	2016	Free	
19	FW	(Norway)	Marcus Pedersen	24	EU	Barnsley (England)	Loan Return ✓	Summer	2015	Free	
15	DF	(Netherlands)	Arnold Kruiswijk	29	EU	Heerenveen	Transfer ✓	Summer	2017	Free	
11	MF	(Ukraine)	Denys Oliynyk	26	Non-EU	Dnipro (Ukraine)	Transfer ✓	Summer	2016	Free	
2	DF	(Brazil)	Wallace	20	Non-EU	Chelsea (England)	Loan ✓	Summer	2015	Free	
14	FW	(Nigeria)	Abiola Dauda	26	EU	Red Star (Serbia)	Transfer ✓	Summer	2017	€ 500K	
18	MF	(Zimbabwe)	Marvelous Nakamba	20	Non-EU	AS Nancy (France)	Transfer ✓	Summer	2018	Free	
6	MF	(England)	Josh McEachran	21	EU	Chelsea (England)	Loan ✓	Summer	2015	Free	
—	MF	(Netherlands)	Alvin Fortes	20	EU	RKC Waalwijk	Transfer ✓	Winter	2016	Free	
—	MF	(Netherlands)	Mo Hamdaoui	21	EU	Dordrecht	Loan Return ✓	Winter	2016	Free	
—	FW	(Russia)	Arshak Koryan	19	EU	Lokomotiv Moscow (Russia)	Transfer ✓	During Season	2015	Free	

Total spending: ▼€500,000

=== Out ===
No.	Pos.	Nat.	Name	Age	EU	Moving to	Type	Transfer window	Transfer fee	Source
19	MF	(Ghana)	Christian Atsu	22	Non-EU	Chelsea (England)	Loan Return ✓	Summer	Free	
17	FW	(Brazil)	Lucas Piazon	20	EU	Chelsea (England)	Loan Return ✓	Summer	Free	
38	DF	(Netherlands)	Patrick van Aanholt	23	EU	Chelsea (England)	Loan Return ✓	Summer	Free	
21	GK	(Estonia)	Marko Meerits	22	EU	FC Emmen	Contract Ended ✓	Summer	Free	
14	FW	(Japan)	Mike Havenaar	27	Non-EU	Córdoba (Spain)	Contract Ended ✓	Summer	Free	
52	MF	(Netherlands)	Sander van de Streek	21	EU	Cambuur	Contract Ended ✓	Summer	Free	
6	DF	(Netherlands)	Frank van der Struijk	29	EU	Free agent	Contract Ended ✓	Summer	Free	
39	MF	(Netherlands)	Wimilio Vink	20	EU	MVV	Contract Ended ✓	Summer	Free	
19	FW	(Norway)	Marcus Pedersen	24	EU	Brann (Norway)	Transfer ✓	Summer	Undisclosed	
44	MF	(Netherlands)	Brahim Darri	20	EU	Heracles	Transfer ✓	Winter	Free	
—	MF	(Netherlands)	Alvin Fortes	20	EU	Free agent	Contract Rescinded ✓	During season	Free	

Total gaining: ▲€0

== Competition ==
=== Eredivisie ===
==== League table ====
Pos	Team	Pld	W	D	L	GF	GA	GD	Pts	Qualification or relegation
3	AZ	34	19	5	10	63	56	+7	62	Qualification for the Europa League third qualifying round
4	Feyenoord	34	17	8	9	56	39	+17	59	Qualification for the European competition play-offs
5	Vitesse (O)	34	16	10	8	66	43	+23	58	Qualification for the European competition play-offs
6	PEC Zwolle	34	16	5	13	59	43	+16	53	Qualification for the European competition play-offs
7	Heerenveen	34	13	11	10	53	46	+7	50	Qualification for the European competition play-offs

Source: NUsport
Rules for classification: 1) points; 2) goal difference; 3) number of goals scored
(O) Play-off winners

==== Matches ====
10 August 2014 1	Ajax	4–1	Vitesse Arnhem	Amsterdam
14:30	Viergever 40'; Schöne 48' 87'; Van der Hoorn 62'	Report	84' Vejinović	Stadium: Amsterdam Arena; Attendance: 48,494; Referee: Pol van Boekel

16 August 2014 2	Vitesse Arnhem	2–2	SC Cambuur	Arnhem
20:45	Labyad 20' 37' (pen.)	Report	10' Hemmen; 89' Ogbeche	Stadium: GelreDome; Attendance: 13,597; Referee: Eric Braamhaar

24 August 2014 3	PEC Zwolle	2–1	Vitesse Arnhem	Zwolle
12:30	Van der Werff 65'; Nijland 88'	Report	24' Pröpper	Stadium: IJsseldelta Stadion; Attendance: 12,012; Referee: Dennis Higler

31 August 2014 4	PSV	2–0	Vitesse Arnhem	Eindhoven
12:30	De Jong 48'; Maher 90+1'	Report		Stadium: Philips Stadion; Attendance: 32,000; Referee: Kevin Blom

14 September 2014 5	Vitesse Arnhem	3–1	Excelsior	Arnhem
14:30	Dauda 40' 60' 65'	Report	86' (pen.) Brito	Stadium: GelreDome; Attendance: 14,234; Referee: Jeroen Sanders

20 September 2014 6	Vitesse Arnhem	1–1	SC Heerenveen	Arnhem
20:45	Pröpper 29'	Report	23' Uth	Stadium: GelreDome; Attendance: 15,213; Referee: Danny Makkelie

27 September 2014 7	FC Dordrecht	2–6	Vitesse Arnhem	Dordrecht
18:30	Fortes 65'; Koolwijk 79'	Report	Dauda 12'; Oliynyk 19'; Kazaishvili 55' 65' 90+3'; Wallace 59'	Stadium: Riwal Hoogwerkers Stadion; Attendance: 3,862; Referee: Serdar Gözübüyük

3 October 2014 8	Vitesse Arnhem	6–1	ADO Den Haag	Arnhem
20:00	Leerdam 5' 14'; Derijck 31' (o.g.); Vejinović 37' 40' (pen.) 62' (pen.)	Report	21' Kramer	Stadium: GelreDome; Attendance: 13,231; Referee: Björn Kuipers

18 October 2014 9	Willem II	1–4	Vitesse Arnhem	Tilburg
18:30	Sahar 57'	Report	15' Pröpper; 45' Traoré; 88' Oliynyk; 90+3' Dauda	Stadium: Koning Willem II Stadion; Attendance: 10,900; Referee: Pieter Vink

25 October 2014 10	Vitesse Arnhem	2–2	NAC Breda	Arnhem
18:30	Vejinović 32' (pen.) 80'	Report	(penalty missed) 42' Falkenburg; 61' 86' Tighadouini	Stadium: GelreDome; Attendance: 17,239; Referee: Danny Makkelie

2 November 2014 11	FC Utrecht	3–1	Vitesse Arnhem	Utrecht
12:30	Kum 12' (yellow card) 59'; Boymans 69' 76' (pen.); Janssen (yellow card) 71'	Summary	Pröpper 11'; Kruiswijk (yellow card) 64' (yellow-red card); Leerdam (yellow card) 77'; Diks (yellow card) 83'	Stadium: Stadion Galgenwaard; Attendance: 16,079; Referee: Kevin Blom

9 November 2014 12	Vitesse Arnhem	0–0	Feyenoord	Arnhem
14:30		Report		Stadium: GelreDome; Attendance: 17,438; Referee: Serdar Gözübüyük

22 November 2014 13	AZ	1–0	Vitesse Arnhem	Alkmaar
18:30	Jóhannsson 14'	Report		Stadium: AFAS Stadion; Attendance: 15,517; Referee: Bas Nijhuis

29 November 2014 14	Vitesse Arnhem	2–2	Go Ahead Eagles	Arnhem
19:45	Vejinović 41'; Dauda 50'	Report	75' Schalk; 83' Amevor	Stadium: GelreDome; Attendance: 15,342; Referee: Tom van Sichem

7 December 2014 15	Vitesse Arnhem	2–2	FC Twente	Arnhem
16:45	Vejinović 17'; Van der Heijden 34'; Pröpper (red card) 49'	Report	33' Corona; 50' (pen.) Ziyech	Stadium: GelreDome; Attendance: 15,894; Referee: Richard Liesveld

14 December 2014 16	FC Groningen	1–1	Vitesse Arnhem	Groningen
14:30	Chery 61'	Report	42' Traoré	Stadium: Euroborg; Attendance: 18,692; Referee: Pieter Vink

21 December 2014 17	Vitesse Arnhem	3–0	Heracles Almelo	Arnhem
12:30	Traoré (yellow card) 22' (goal) 25' 43'; Labyad 32'	Summary	Veldmate (yellow card) 27'	Stadium: GelreDome; Attendance: 15,432; Referee: Ed Janssen

17 January 2015 18	Vitesse Arnhem	0–1	PSV	Arnhem
20:45		Report	10' Maher	Stadium: GelreDome; Attendance: 17,894; Referee: Serdar Gözübüyük

24 January 2015 19	SC Heerenveen	4–1	Vitesse Arnhem	Heerenveen
20:45	Slagveer 4' 53'; Uth 10'; Sinkgraven 42'	Report	77' Kashia	Stadium: Abe Lenstra Stadion; Attendance: 23,900; Referee: Dennis Higler

1 February 2015 20	Vitesse Arnhem	1–0	Ajax	Arnhem
14:30	Đurđević 85'	Report		Stadium: GelreDome; Attendance: 20,384; Referee: Pieter Vink

4 February 2015 21	SC Cambuur	0–2	Vitesse Arnhem	Leeuwarden
20:45		Report	34' Qazaishvili; 56' Oliynyk	Stadium: Cambuur Stadion; Attendance: 9,373; Referee: Jochem Kamphuis

7 February 2015 22	NAC Breda	0–1	Vitesse Arnhem	Breda
20:45		Report	64' Traoré	Stadium: Rat Verlegh Stadion; Attendance: 17,800; Referee: Reinold Wiedemeijer

14 February 2015 23	Vitesse Arnhem	2–0	Willem II	Arnhem
19:45	Labyad 28'; Traoré 44'	Report		Stadium: GelreDome; Attendance: 13,956; Referee: Edwin van de Graaf

22 February 2015 24	FC Twente	1–2	Vitesse Arnhem	Enschede
14:30	Corona 82'	Report	17' Labyad; 90+2' Qazaishvili	Stadium: De Grolsch Veste; Attendance: 27,600; Referee: Danny Makkelie

28 February 2015 25	Vitesse Arnhem	2–1	PEC Zwolle	Arnhem
18:30	Traoré 34'; Vejinović (penalty missed) 45+1'; Pröpper 64'	Report	4' Saymak	Stadium: GelreDome; Attendance: 22,354; Referee: Kevin Blom

7 March 2015 26	Heracles Almelo	1–1	Vitesse Arnhem	Almelo
19:45	Avdić 90+4'	Report	21' Traoré	Stadium: Polman Stadion; Attendance: 8,231; Referee: Björn Kuipers

13 March 2015 27	Vitesse Arnhem	3–1	AZ Alkmaar	Arnhem
20:00	Traoré 7'; Vejinović 73' (pen.); Qazaishvili 90+4'	Report	8' Berghuis	Stadium: GelreDome; Attendance: 23,381; Referee: Reinold Wiedemeijer

21 March 2015 28	Go Ahead Eagles	0–2	Vitesse Arnhem	Deventer
18:30		Report	5' Labyad; 65' Vejinović	Stadium: De Adelaarshorst; Attendance: 7,863; Referee: Danny Makkelie

4 April 2015 29	Vitesse Arnhem	1–1	FC Groningen	Arnhem
18:30	van der Heijden (yellow card) 60'; Padt 79' (o.g.); Đurđević (yellow card) 90+4'	Summary	Lindgren 13'; Hoesen (yellow card) 71'; Padt (yellow card) 75'; Mahi (yellow card) 80' van der Velden (yellow card) 84'	Stadium: GelreDome; Attendance: 20,121; Referee: Bas Nijhuis

11 April 2015 30	Excelsior	1–3	Vitesse Arnhem	Rotterdam
18:30	Van Weert 41'	Report	39' 72' Traoré; 90+2' Ibarra	Stadium: Stadion Woudestein; Attendance: 3,600; Referee: Siemen Mulder

18 April 2015 31	Vitesse Arnhem	3–0	FC Dordrecht	Arnhem
19:45	Qazaishvili 52' 65'; Ibarra 68'	Report		Stadium: GelreDome; Attendance: 17,126; Referee: Jochem Kamphuis

24 April 2015 32	ADO Den Haag	1–0	Vitesse Arnhem	The Hague
20:00	Kramer 85'	Report		Stadium: Kyocera Stadion; Attendance: 14,837; Referee: Ed Janssen

11 May 2015 33	Feyenoord	1–4	Vitesse Arnhem	Rotterdam
20:00	Toornstra 38'	Report	Qazaishvili 12' v.d. Heijden 31'; Achenteh 43'; Labyad 90+1'	Stadium: De Kuip; Attendance: 46,500; Referee: Björn Kuipers

17 May 2015 34	Vitesse Arnhem	3–3	FC Utrecht	Arnhem
14:30	Traoré 13' 65'; Labyad 89'		Ayoub 44'; Ramselaar 46'; Verbeek 88'	Stadium: GelreDome; Attendance: 18,696; Referee: Danny Makkelie

=== KNVB Cup ===
23 September 2014 Second round	VVSB	1–2	Vitesse Arnhem	Noordwijkerhout
17:00	Van der Slot 71'	Report	20' Traoré; 90+1' Ibarra	Stadium: Sportpark de Boekhorst; Attendance: 1,000; Referee: Richard Martens

28 October 2014 Third round	Vitesse Arnhem	2–1	FC Dordrecht	Arnhem
20:45	Vejinović 45' (pen.); Oliynyk 81'	Report	83' Van Haaren	Stadium: GelreDome; Attendance: 7,000; Referee: Dennis Higler

18 December 2014 Fourth round	Ajax	0–4	Vitesse Arnhem	Amsterdam
20:45		Report	22' 57' Traoré; 45+1' Labyad; 60' Qazaishvili	Stadium: Amsterdam Arena; Attendance: 35,835; Referee: Bas Nijhuis

28 January 2015 Quarter-final	FC Groningen	4–0	Vitesse Arnhem	Groningen
20:45	De Leeuw (penalty missed) 66'; Chery 63'; Van Nieff 76'; Kieftenbeld 78'		(red card) 61' Kashia	Stadium: Euroborg; Attendance: 12,458; Referee: Björn Kuipers

=== Play-offs ===
Play-offs for a spot in the 2015–16 UEFA Europa League third qualifying round; Vitesse wins the play-offs.

21 May 2015 Semi-final, leg one	PEC Zwolle	1–2	Vitesse Arnhem	Zwolle
20:45	Van der Werff 31'	Report	68' Vejinović; 74' Qazaishvili	Stadium: IJsseldelta Stadion; Attendance: 7,200; Referee: Pol van Boekel

24 May 2015 Semi-final, leg two	Vitesse Arnhem	1–1 (3–2 agg.)	PEC Zwolle	Arnhem
12:30	Traoré 18'	Report	56' Necid; (yellow card) 49' (yellow-red card) 80' Van der Werff	Stadium: GelreDome; Attendance: 16,116; Referee: Eric Braamhaar

28 May 2015 Final, leg one	SC Heerenveen	2–2	Vitesse Arnhem	Heerenveen
20:45	Slagveer 32'; Uth 75'	Report	21' Qazaishvili; 66' Pröpper	Stadium: Abe Lenstra Stadion; Attendance: 16,620; Referee: Björn Kuipers

31 May 2015 Final, leg two	Vitesse Arnhem	5–2 (7–4 agg.)	SC Heerenveen	Arnhem
16:45	Kashia 11'; Vejinović 56'; Pröpper 77'; Labyad 82'; Van der Heijden 86'	Report	4' 24' Uth	Stadium: GelreDome; Attendance: 17,529; Referee: Bas Nijhuis

=== Friendlies ===
==== Pre-season ====
4 July 2014	Vitesse Arnhem	1–1	Cercle Brugge K.S.V. (Belgium)	Loenen
19:00	Labyad 50' (pen.)	Report	13' Wils	Stadium: Lonapark; Attendance: 500; Referee: Pol van Boekel

12 July 2014	Vitesse Arnhem	0–0	Sparta Rotterdam	Driel
16:00		Report		Stadium: Sportveld Driel; Attendance: 1,131; Referee: Martin Pérez

15 July 2014	(Germany) VfL Osnabrück	2–2	Vitesse Arnhem	Osnabrück
19:00	Chahed 29'; Feldhahn 57' (pen.)	Report	30' Pedersen; 71' Labyad	Stadium: osnatel-Arena; Attendance: 500; Referee: (Germany) Frank Willenborg

18 July 2014	(Germany) Hertha BSC	0–0	Vitesse Arnhem	Marienfeld (Harsewinkel)
18:00		Report		Stadium: Hotel Klosterpforte; Attendance: - Referee: (Germany) Sören Storks

26 July 2014	Vitesse Arnhem	1–1	Levante UD (Spain)	Driel
16:00	Pröpper 80'	Report	32' Barral	Stadium: Sportveld Driel; Attendance: 1,224; Referee: Jochem Kamphuis

30 July 2014	Vitesse Arnhem	1–3	Chelsea F.C. (England)	Arnhem
19:30	Đurđević 89'	Report	4' Salah; 24' Fàbregas; 76' Matić	Stadium: GelreDome; Attendance: 19,273; Referee: Kevin Blom

3 August 2014	(England) Bolton Wanderers F.C.	0–1	Vitesse Arnhem	Horwich
14:00 (GMT)		Report	16' Vejinović	Stadium: Macron Stadium; Attendance: 5,399; Referee: (England) Chris Kavanagh

==== 2015 ====
9 January 2015	(Belgium) R.S.C. Anderlecht	5–0	Vitesse Arnhem	Los Belones
16:00	Cyriac 29'; Dendoncker 53'; Leya Iseka 68'; Mitrović 72'; Tarfi 73'			Stadium: La Manga Club; Attendance: 300; Referee: (Spain) Jorge Díaz Escudero

25 March 2015	Vitesse Arnhem	3–1	Lierse S.K. (Belgium)	Loenen
14:30	Hamdaoui 44' 71'; Kruiswijk 51'		11' Velikonja	Stadium: Lonapark; Referee: Jeroen Sanders
