= 2015–16 SBV Vitesse season =

Vitesse Arnhem
2015–16 season
- Chairman: Bert Roetert
- Manager: Peter Bosz (until 4 January 2016); Rob Maas (from 4 January 2016) (until 8 May 2016)
- Eredivisie: 9th
- KNVB Cup: Second round
- UEFA Europa League: Third qualifying round
- Top goalscorer: League: Valeri Kazaishvili (10 goals); All: Valeri Kazaishvili (10 goals)
- Highest home attendance: 21,163 vs Ajax
- Lowest home attendance: 13,212 vs Roda JC Kerkrade
Home colours	Away colours	Third colours

During the 2015–16 season Vitesse Arnhem participated in the Dutch Eredivisie, in the KNVB Cup and the UEFA Europa League.

== Players ==
=== Squad details ===
As of 8 May 2016

No.	name.	Pos.	Nat.	Place of birth	Date of birth (age)	Club caps	Club goals	Int. apps	Int. goals	Signed from	Date signed	Fee	Contract End
Goalkeepers
1	Eloy Room	GK	(Curaçao)	Nijmegen (Netherlands)	6 February 1989 (age 37)	117	0	4	0	Academy	1 July 2008	Free	30 June 2018
22	Piet Velthuizen	GK	(Netherlands)	Nijmegen	3 November 1986 (age 40)	240	0	1	0	Hércules (Spain)	26 July 2011	Free	30 June 2016
48	Jeroen Houwen	GK	(Netherlands)	Venray	18 February 1996 (age 30)	–	–	–	–	Academy	1 July 2013	Free	30 June 2018
Defenders
3	Maikel van der Werff	CB/RB/LB	(Netherlands)	Hoorn	22 April 1989 (age 37)	28	0	–	–	PEC Zwolle	19 February 2015	Free	30 June 2019
5	Kelvin Leerdam	LB/DM/CB	(Netherlands)	Paramaribo (Suriname)	24 June 1990 (age 36)	73	11	–	–	Feyenoord	2 July 2013	Free	30 June 2017
6	Arnold Kruiswijk	CB	(Netherlands)	Groningen	2 November 1984 (age 42)	40	0	–	–	Heerenveen	19 May 2014	Free	30 June 2017
8	Kosuke Ota	LB/CB	(Japan)	Tokyo	23 July 1987 (age 39)	16	0	6	0	FC Tokyo (Japan)	1 January 2016	Free	30 June 2020
17	Kevin Diks	RB/CB	(Netherlands)	Apeldoorn	6 October 1996 (age 30)	63	2	–	–	Academy	1 July 2014	Free	30 June 2018
37	Guram Kashia (c)	CB/RB	(Georgia (country))	Tbilisi	4 July 1987 (age 39)	211	18	42	1	Dinamo Tbilisi (Georgia (country))	31 August 2010	€ 300K	30 June 2020
44	Thomas Oude Kotte	CB	(Netherlands)	Apeldoorn	20 March 1996 (age 30)	2	0	–	–	Academy	1 July 2015	Free	30 June 2018
45	Leeroy Schorea	RB/LB	(Netherlands)	Nijmegen	3 March 1997 (age 29)	–	–	–	–	Academy	1 July 2015	Free	30 June 2018
49	Julian Lelieveld	RB/CB	(Netherlands)	Arnhem	24 November 1997 (age 28)	2	0	–	–	Academy	29 July 2015	Free	30 June 2020
Midfielders
10	Valeri Kazaishvili	AM/SS/RW	(Georgia (country))	Ozurgeti	23 January 1993 (age 33)	118	27	13	3	Olimpi (Georgia (country))	9 August 2011	Nominal	30 June 2018
11	Denys Oliynyk	LW/AM	(Ukraine)	Zaporizhia	16 June 1987 (age 39)	62	10	12	0	Dnipro (Ukraine)	26 May 2014	Free	30 June 2016
13	Nathan	AM/LW/SS	(Brazil)	Blumenau	13 March 1996 (age 30)	19	2	–	–	Chelsea (England)	10 July 2015	Loan	30 June 2016
18	Marvelous Nakamba	CM/DM/LB	(Zimbabwe)	Hwange	19 January 1994 (age 32)	41	1	1	0	Nancy (France)	13 August 2014	Free	30 June 2018
20	Danilo Pantić	AM/LW	(Serbia)	Ruma	26 October 1996 (age 30)	8	0	–	–	Chelsea (England)	13 July 2015	Loan	30 June 2016
21	Sheran Yeini	DM/RB	(Israel)	Tel Aviv	8 December 1986 (age 39)	27	1	16	0	Maccabi Tel Aviv (Israel)	20 April 2015	Free	30 June 2019
26	Milot Rashica	AM/RW/LW	(Albania)	Vushtrri (Kosovo)	28 June 1996 (age 30)	34	8	–	–	Kosova Vushtrri (Kosovo)	10 February 2015	€ 300K	30 June 2018
30	Renato Ibarra	RW	(Ecuador)	Ambuquí	20 January 1991 (age 35)	146	12	26	0	El Nacional (Ecuador)	8 July 2011	€ 2M	30 June 2017
31	Arshak Koryan	RW/LW	(Russia)	Sochi	17 June 1995 (age 31)	–	–	–	–	Lokomotiv Moscow (Russia)	2 February 2015	Free	30 June 2016
34	Lewis Baker	CM/AM/RW	(England)	Luton	25 April 1995 (age 31)	34	5	–	–	Chelsea (England)	27 June 2015	Loan	30 June 2016
40	Elmo Lieftink	DM/CM	(Netherlands)	Deventer	3 February 1994 (age 32)	–	–	–	–	Academy	30 March 2015	Free	30 June 2018
41	Mo Osman	AM/LW	(Netherlands)	Qamishli (Syria)	1 January 1994 (age 32)	1	0	–	–	Academy	30 March 2015	Free	30 June 2016
42	Mitchell van Bergen	RW/LW/AM	(Netherlands)	Oss	27 August 1999 (age 27)	1	0	–	–	Academy	17 December 2015	Free	30 June 2018
Forwards
7	Isaiah Brown	SS/RW/LW	(England)	Peterborough	7 January 1997 (age 29)	24	1	–	–	Chelsea (England)	10 July 2015	Loan	30 June 2016
9	Dominic Solanke	ST/SS	(England)	Basingstoke	14 September 1997 (age 29)	26	7	–	–	Chelsea (England)	4 August 2015	Loan	30 June 2016
43	Zhang Yuning	ST/SS	(China)	Wenzhou	5 January 1997 (age 29)	8	2	–	–	Hangzhou Greentown (China)	1 July 2015	Free	30 June 2017

== Transfers ==
=== In ===
No.	Pos.	Nat.	Name	Age	EU	Moving from	Type	Transfer window	Ends	Transfer fee	Source
26	MF	(Albania)	Milot Rashica	18	Non-EU	Kosova Vushtrri (Kosovo)	Transfer ✓	Summer	2018	€300K	
3	DF	(Netherlands)	Maikel van der Werff	25	EU	PEC Zwolle	Transfer ✓	Summer	2019	Free	
40	MF	(Netherlands)	Elmo Lieftink	21	EU	Youth system	Promoted ✓	Summer	2018	Free	
41	MF	(Netherlands)	Mo Osman	21	EU	Youth system	Promoted ✓	Summer	2016	Free	
21	MF	(Israel)	Sheran Yeini	28	Non-EU	Maccabi Tel Aviv (Israel)	Transfer ✓	Summer	2019	Undisclosed	
34	MF	(England)	Lewis Baker	20	EU	Chelsea (England)	Loan ✓	Summer	2016	Free	
13	MF	(Brazil)	Nathan	19	Non-EU	Chelsea (England)	Loan ✓	Summer	2016	Free	
7	FW	(England)	Isaiah Brown	18	EU	Chelsea (England)	Loan ✓	Summer	2016	Free	
20	MF	(Serbia)	Danilo Pantić	18	Non-EU	Chelsea (England)	Loan ✓	Summer	2016	Free	
9	FW	(England)	Dominic Solanke	17	EU	Chelsea (England)	Loan ✓	Summer	2016	Free	
8	DF	(Japan)	Kosuke Ota	27	Non-EU	FC Tokyo (Japan)	Transfer ✓	Winter	2020	Undisclosed	

Total spending: ▼€300,000

=== Out ===
No.	Pos.	Nat.	Name	Age	EU	Moving to	Type	Transfer window	Transfer fee	Source
—	MF	(Netherlands)	Mo Hamdaoui	22	EU	Go Ahead Eagles	Transfer ✓	Summer	Undisclosed	
23	DF	(Netherlands)	Jan-Arie van der Heijden	27	EU	Free agent	Contract Ended ✓	Summer	Free	
3	DF	(Israel)	Dan Mori	26	Non-EU	Free agent	Contract Ended ✓	Summer	Free	
20	MF	(Morocco)	Zakaria Labyad	22	EU	Sporting CP (Portugal)	Loan Return ✓	Summer	Free	
6	MF	(England)	Josh McEachran	22	EU	Chelsea (England)	Loan Return ✓	Summer	Free	
27	MF	(Burkina Faso)	Bertrand Traoré	19	Non-EU	Chelsea (England)	Loan Return ✓	Summer	Free	
2	DF	(Brazil)	Wallace	21	Non-EU	Chelsea (England)	Loan Return ✓	Summer	Free	
7	MF	(Netherlands)	Marko Vejinović	25	EU	Feyenoord	Transfer ✓	Summer	€3.5M	
25	MF	(Netherlands)	Gino Bosz	22	EU	Heracles	Transfer ✓	Summer	Undisclosed	
10	MF	(Netherlands)	Davy Pröpper	23	EU	PSV	Transfer ✓	Summer	€4.5M	
9	FW	(Serbia)	Uroš Đurđević	21	Non-EU	Free agent	Contract Rescinded ✓	Summer	Free	
35	DF	(Morocco)	Rochdi Achenteh	27	Non-EU	Willem II	Transfer ✓	Winter	Free	
14	FW	(Nigeria)	Abiola Dauda	27	Non-EU	Heart of Midlothian (Scotland)	Loan ✓	Winter	Free	

Total gaining: ▲€8,000,000

Balance

Total: ▲€7,700,000

== Competition ==
=== Friendlies ===
==== Pre-season ====
4 July 2015	Vitesse Arnhem	2–2	KV Oostende	Arnhem
19:00	Ten Teije 1'; Gouw 58'	Report	12' Jonckheere; 29' Lukaku; (red card) 42' Musona	Stadium: Sportpark Rijkerswoerd; Attendance: 700; Referee: Edwin van de Graaf

10 July 2015	Vitesse Arnhem	4–0	Dundee United	Driel
19:30	Đurđević 14', 17'; Oliynyk 54'; Vako 69'	Report		Stadium: Sportveld Driel; Attendance: 1,824; Referee: Pol van Boekel

14 July 2015	Sparta Prague	1–1	Vitesse Arnhem	Gallneukirchen
18:30	Krejčí 43'; Dočkal (red card) 85'	Report	2' Dauda	Stadium: Gusenparkstadion; Referee: (Austria) Gregor Leonfellner

17 July 2015	Vitesse Arnhem	1–0	Çaykur Rizespor	Seekirchen am Wallersee
19:30	Van der Werff 59'	Report		Stadium: Sportzentrum Seekirchen; Attendance: 30; Referee: (Austria) Mario Weghofer

22 July 2015	Vitesse Arnhem	3–2	Asteras Tripolis	Arnhem
19:00	Brown 36' (pen.); Rashica 40', 60'	Report	19' (pen.) Apostolos; 90' Mazza	Stadium: Sportpark Schuytgraaf; Attendance: 1,312; Referee: Pol van Boekel

=== Overview ===
Competition	Record							
Competition	G	W	D	L	GF	GA	GD	Win %
Eredivisie	34	12	10	12	55	38	+17	35.29
KNVB Cup	1	0	0	1	1	4	−3	0.00
Europa League	2	0	0	2	0	5	−5	0.00
Total	37	12	10	15	56	47	+9	32.43

Updated to match played 8 May 2016
Source: Competitions

=== Eredivisie ===
==== League table ====
Pos	Team	Pld	W	D	L	GF	GA	GD	Pts	Qualification or relegation
7	Groningen	34	14	8	12	41	48	−7	50	Qualification for the European competition play-offs (Note: Four teams played for one spot in the UEFA Europa League third qualifying round.)
8	PEC Zwolle	34	14	6	14	56	54	+2	48	Qualification for the European competition play-offs
9	Vitesse	34	12	10	12	55	38	+17	46	
10	NEC	34	13	7	14	37	42	−5	46	
11	ADO Den Haag	34	10	13	11	48	49	−1	43	

Source: Eredivisie, NUsport, Soccerway
Rules for classification: 1) Points; 2) Goal difference; 3) Goals scored; 4) Head-to-head points; 5) Head-to-head goal difference; 6) Head-to-head away goals scored; 7) Play-off (only if deciding champion, European competitions, or relegation); 8) Draw.

==== Results ====
9 August 2015 1	Willem II	1–1	Vitesse Arnhem	Tilburg
16:45	Falkenburg 64'	Report	74' (red card) 90+3' Oliynyk	Stadium: Koning Willem II Stadion; Attendance: 11,000; Referee: Jochem Kamphuis

14 August 2015 2	Vitesse Arnhem	3–0	Roda JC Kerkrade	Arnhem
20:00	Baker 45+1' (pen.); Dauda 68'; Nathan 80'	Report	(red card) 45' Van Peppen	Stadium: GelreDome; Attendance: 13,212; Referee: Eric Braamhaar

23 August 2015 3	Feyenoord	2–0	Vitesse Arnhem	Rotterdam
16:45	Kuyt 77' (pen.); Başaçıkoğlu 79'	Report		Stadium: De Kuip; Attendance: 47,500; Referee: Serdar Gözübüyük

30 August 2015 4	Vitesse Arnhem	4–1	SC Cambuur	Arnhem
14:30	Baker 2' (pen.) (penalty missed) 67'; Dauda 32'; Kashia 85'; Solanke 90+1'	Report	28' Van de Streek	Stadium: GelreDome; Attendance: 13,573; Referee: Allard Lindhout

13 September 2015 5	FC Utrecht	2–1	Vitesse Arnhem	Utrecht
16:45	Janssen 15'; Ramselaar 51'	Report	19' Kashia	Stadium: Stadion Galgenwaard; Attendance: 16,056; Referee: Bas Nijhuis

20 September 2015 6	Vitesse Arnhem	3–0	De Graafschap	Arnhem
16:45	Kashia 6'; Kazaishvili 21'; Rashica 73'	Report		Stadium: GelreDome; Attendance: 15,139; Referee: Martin van den Kerkhof

26 September 2015 7	SC Heerenveen	0–0	Vitesse Arnhem	Heerenveen
18:30		Report		Stadium: Abe Lenstra Stadion; Attendance: 23,984; Referee: Dennis Higler

4 October 2015 8	Vitesse Arnhem	5–0	FC Groningen	Arnhem
14:30	Solanke 18'; Diks 61'; Kazaishvili 65'; Nathan 87'; Dauda 90+3'	Report		Stadium: GelreDome; Attendance: 16,185; Referee: Björn Kuipers

18 October 2015 9	PEC Zwolle	1–5	Vitesse Arnhem	Zwolle
16:45	Lam 15'; Bouy (red card) 50'	Report	7' Baker; 21' (pen.) Solanke; 44' Kazaishvili; 52' (pen.) Oliynyk; 78' Rashica	Stadium: IJsseldelta Stadion; Attendance: 12,250; Referee: Pol van Boekel

25 October 2015 10	Vitesse Arnhem	1–3	Ajax	Arnhem
14:30	Kazaishvili 54'	Report	71' Fischer; 73' Bazoer; 86' Schöne	Stadium: GelreDome; Attendance: 21,163; Referee: Richard Liesveld

31 October 2015 11	Excelsior	0–3	Vitesse Arnhem	Rotterdam
19:45		Report	16' (pen.) Solanke; 49' Diks; 54' Rashica	Stadium: Stadion Woudestein; Attendance: 3,600; Referee: Jochem Kamphuis

8 November 2015 12	Vitesse Arnhem	0–2	AZ	Arnhem
16:45		Report	75' Janssen; 78' Henriksen	Stadium: GelreDome; Attendance: 15,327; Referee: Ed Janssen

22 November 2015 13	ADO Den Haag	2–2	Vitesse Arnhem	The Hague
16:45	Schaken 33'; Derijck 51' (pen.)	Report	6' Yeini; 37' Leerdam	Stadium: Kyocera Stadion; Attendance: 12,113; Referee: Bas Nijhuis

29 November 2015 14	Vitesse Arnhem	1–0	NEC	Arnhem
12:30	Kazaishvili 49'	Report		Stadium: GelreDome; Attendance: 19,212; Referee: Björn Kuipers

5 December 2015 15	Vitesse Arnhem	0–1	PSV	Arnhem
19:45		Report	90' Hendrix	Stadium: GelreDome; Attendance: 16,879; Referee: Kevin Blom

13 December 2015 16	Heracles Almelo	1–1	Vitesse Arnhem	Almelo
16:45	Tannane 65'	Report	75' Rashica	Stadium: Polman Stadion; Attendance: 10,821; Referee: Richard Liesveld

18 December 2015 17	Vitesse Arnhem	5–1	FC Twente	Arnhem
20:00	Kazaishvili 10'; Rashica 18', 58'; Solanke 55'; Oliynyk 82'	Report	44' Ziyech	Stadium: GelreDome; Attendance: 15,987; Referee: Serdar Gözübüyük

16 January 2016 18	Cambuur	0–2	Vitesse Arnhem	Leeuwarden
18:30		Report	48' Rashica; 90' Kazaishvili	Stadium: Cambuur Stadion; Attendance: 9,508; Referee: Eric Braamhaar

23 January 2016 19	Ajax	1–0	Vitesse Arnhem	Amsterdam
19:45	Bazoer 1'	Report		Stadium: Amsterdam Arena; Attendance: 48,553; Referee: Bjorn Kuipers

27 January 2016 20	Vitesse Arnhem	1–1	PEC Zwolle	Arnhem
20:45	van Polen 65' (og.)	Report	68' Marcellis	Stadium: GelreDome; Attendance: 14,876; Referee: Ed Janssen

30 January 2016 21	Vitesse Arnhem	0–0	Excelsior	Arnhem
18:30		Report		Stadium: GelreDome; Attendance: 20,112; Referee: Jeroen Manschot

6 February 2016 22	AZ	1–0	Vitesse Arnhem	Alkmaar
19:45	Janssen 62'	Report		Stadium: AFAS Stadion; Attendance: 15,006; Referee: Bas Nijhuis

13 February 2016 23	Vitesse Arnhem	3–0	SC Heerenveen	Arnhem
20:45	Oliynyk 20'; Kazaishvili 44', 53' (pen.)	Report		Stadium: GelreDome; Attendance: 15,234; Referee: Siemen Mulder

21 February 2016 24	De Graafschap	2–2	Vitesse Arnhem	Doetinchem
12:30	Vermeij 40', 47'	Report	16' Nakamba; 84' Baker; (yellow card) 60' (yellow-red card) 90' Ota	Stadium: De Vijverberg; Attendance: 12,218; Referee: Serdar Gözübüyük

27 February 2016 25	Vitesse Arnhem	0–1	Willem II	Arnhem
20:45		Report	62' Ondaan	Stadium: GelreDome; Attendance: 15,987; Referee: Richard Liesveld

6 March 2016 26	Roda JC Kerkrade	1–2	Vitesse Arnhem	Kerkrade
14:30	van Duinen 59'	Report	34' Brown; 90+1' Zhang	Stadium: Parkstad Limburg Stadion; Attendance: 15,184; Referee: Allard Lindhout

13 March 2016 27	Vitesse Arnhem	0–2	Feyenoord	Arnhem
14:30		Report	73' Kramer; 88' Başaçıkoğlu	Stadium: GelreDome; Attendance: 18,834; Referee: Björn Kuipers

20 March 2016 28	FC Groningen	0–3	Vitesse Arnhem	Groningen
14:30		Report	73', 85' Solanke; 78' Kazaishvili	Stadium: Euroborg; Attendance: 21,331; Referee: Ed Janssen

3 April 2016 29	NEC	2–1	Vitesse Arnhem	Nijmegen
12:30	Limbombe 45'; Dumić 81'	Report	84' Baker	Stadium: Stadion de Goffert; Attendance: 12,500; Referee: Danny Makkelie

9 April 2016 30	Vitesse Arnhem	2–2	ADO Den Haag	Arnhem
19:45	Kashia 35'; Oliynyk 90'	Report	7' Havenaar; 63' (og.) van der Werff	Stadium: GelreDome; Attendance: 16,298; Referee: Jochem Kamphuis

16 April 2016 31	Vitesse Arnhem	1–1	Heracles Almelo	Arnhem
18:30	Rashica 48'	Report	81' (pen.) Weghorst	Stadium: GelreDome; Attendance: 21,231; Referee: Bas Nijhuis

19 April 2016 32	PSV	2–0	Vitesse Arnhem	Eindhoven
20:45	Pröpper 12' de Jong 71' (pen.)	Report		Stadium: Philips Stadion; Attendance: 34,000; Referee: Pieter Vink

1 May 2016 33	Vitesse Arnhem	1–3	FC Utrecht	Arnhem
14:30	Kashia 30'	Report	74' Barazite; 85' Boymans; 88' Leeuwin	Stadium: GelreDome; Attendance: 18,121; Referee: Serdar Gözübüyük

8 May 2016 34	FC Twente	2–2	Vitesse Arnhem	Enschede
14:30	El Azzouzi 27'; Ede 66'	Report	3' (og.) Uvini; 61' Zhang	Stadium: De Grolsch Veste; Attendance: 26,500; Referee: Reinold Wiedemeijer

=== KNVB Cup ===
23 September 2015 Second round	Heracles Almelo	4–1 (a.e.t.)	Vitesse Arnhem	Almelo
20:00	Tannane (penalty missed) 90+2 94'; Gosens 90+4'; Gladon 101'; Weghorst 114'	Report	17' Oliynyk; Ibarra (yellow card) 10' (yellow-red card) 63'; Nakamba (yellow card) 54' (yellow-red card) 81'; Kashia (yellow card) 66' (yellow-red card) 90'	Stadium: Polman Stadion; Attendance: 10,587; Referee: Makkelie

=== Europa League ===
==== Third qualifying round ====
30 July 2015 First leg	(England) Southampton	3–0	Vitesse Arnhem	Southampton
20:05 (GMT)	Pellè 36'; Tadić 45+1' (pen.); Long 84'	Report		Stadium: St Mary's Stadium; Attendance: 30,850; Referee: (Spain) Jesús Gil Manzano

6 August 2015 Second leg	Vitesse Arnhem	0–2	Southampton (England)	Arnhem
20:00		Report	Pellè 4'; Mané 89'	Stadium: GelreDome; Attendance: 20,550; Referee: Ilias Spathas (Greece)

== Statistics ==
=== Appearances ===
No.	Pos.	Name	Eredivisie		KNVB Cup		Europa League		Total		Discipline	
No.	Pos.	Name	Apps	Goals	Apps	Goals	Apps	Goals	Apps	Goals	Yellow card	Red card
1	GK	(Curaçao) Eloy Room	34	0	0	0	2	0	36	0	0	0
3	DF	(Netherlands) Maikel van der Werff	25 (1)	0	1	0	1	0	27 (1)	0	5	0
5	DF	(Netherlands) Kelvin Leerdam	14 (1)	1	1	0	2	0	17 (1)	1	5	0
6	DF	(Netherlands) Arnold Kruiswijk	20 (2)	0	0	0	0	0	20 (2)	0	2	0
7	FW	(England) Isaiah Brown	12 (10)	1	0	0	2	0	14 (10)	1	3	0
8	DF	(Japan) Kosuke Ota	15 (1)	0	0	0	0	0	15 (1)	0	5	1
9	FW	(England) Dominic Solanke	21 (4)	7	1	0	0	0	22 (4)	7	0	0
10	MF	(Georgia (country)) Valeri Kazaishvili	31 (2)	10	1	0	2	0	34 (2)	10	0	0
11	MF	(Ukraine) Denys Oliynyk	18 (7)	5	1	1	2	0	21 (7)	6	3	0
13	MF	(Brazil) Nathan	4 (14)	2	0	0	0 (1)	0	4 (15)	2	0	0
17	DF	(Netherlands) Kevin Diks	29 (1)	2	1	0	2	0	32 (1)	2	5	0
18	MF	(Zimbabwe) Marvelous Nakamba	30	1	1	0	2	0	33	1	6	2
20	MF	(Serbia) Danilo Pantić	0 (6)	0	0	0	0 (2)	0	0 (8)	0	0	0
21	MF	(Israel) Sheran Yeini	23 (3)	1	1	0	0	0	24 (3)	1	6	0
22	GK	(Netherlands) Piet Velthuizen	0	0	1	0	0	0	1	0	1	0
26	MF	(Albania) Milot Rashica	29 (2)	8	0 (1)	0	1 (1)	0	30 (4)	8	3	0
30	MF	(Ecuador) Renato Ibarra	8 (8)	0	1	0	0	0	9 (8)	0	3	1
34	MF	(England) Lewis Baker	23 (8)	5	0 (1)	0	2	0	25 (9)	5	2	0
37	DF	(Georgia (country)) Guram Kashia	26 (1)	5	1	0	2	0	29 (1)	5	4	1
40	MF	(Netherlands) Elmo Lieftink	0	0	0	0	0	0	0	0	0	0
41	MF	(Netherlands) Mohammed Osman	0 (1)	0	0	0	0	0	0 (1)	0	0	0
42	FW	(Netherlands) Mitchell van Bergen	0 (1)	0	0	0	0	0	0 (1)	0	0	0
43	FW	(China) Zhang Yuning	1 (7)	2	0	0	0	0	1 (7)	2	0	0
44	DF	(Netherlands) Thomas Oude Kotte	1 (1)	0	0	0	0	0	1 (1)	0	0	0
45	DF	(Netherlands) Leeroy Schorea	0	0	0	0	0	0	0	0	0	0
48	GK	(Netherlands) Jeroen Houwen	0	0	0	0	0	0	0	0	0	0
49	DF	(Netherlands) Julian Lelieveld	1	0	0	0	0 (1)	0	1 (1)	0	0	0
Players who left the club in August/January transfer window or on loan
14	FW	(Nigeria) Abiola Dauda	4 (7)	3	0	0	0	0	4 (7)	3	0	0
35	DF	(Morocco) Rochdi Achenteh	5	0	0	0	1 (1)	0	6 (1)	0	1	0
—	FW	(Serbia) Uroš Đurđević	0	0	0	0	1	0	1	0	0	0

Last updated: 8 May 2016.
Source: Vitesse

=== Top scorers ===
The list is sorted by shirt number when total goals are equal.

Rnk	Pos	No.	Player	Eredivisie	KNVB Cup	Europa League	Total
1	MF	10	(Georgia (country)) Valeri Kazaishvili	10	0	0	10
2	MF	26	(Albania) Milot Rashica	8	0	0	8
3	FW	9	(England) Dominic Solanke	7	0	0	7
4	MF	11	(Ukraine) Denys Oliynyk	5	1	0	6
5	MF	34	(England) Lewis Baker	5	0	0	5
5	DF	37	(Georgia (country)) Guram Kashia	5	0	0	5
7	FW	14	(Nigeria) Abiola Dauda	3	0	0	3
8	MF	13	(Brazil) Nathan	2	0	0	2
8	DF	17	(Netherlands) Kevin Diks	2	0	0	2
8	FW	43	(China) Zhang Yuning	2	0	0	2
11	DF	5	(Netherlands) Kelvin Leerdam	1	0	0	1
11	MF	7	(England) Isaiah Brown	1	0	0	1
11	MF	18	(Zimbabwe) Marvelous Nakamba	1	0	0	1
11	MF	21	(Israel) Sheran Yeini	1	0	0	1
Own goals				2	0	0	2
Total				54	1	0	57

Last updated: 8 May 2016.
