= Kelvin Leerdam =

Surinamese footballer (born 1990)

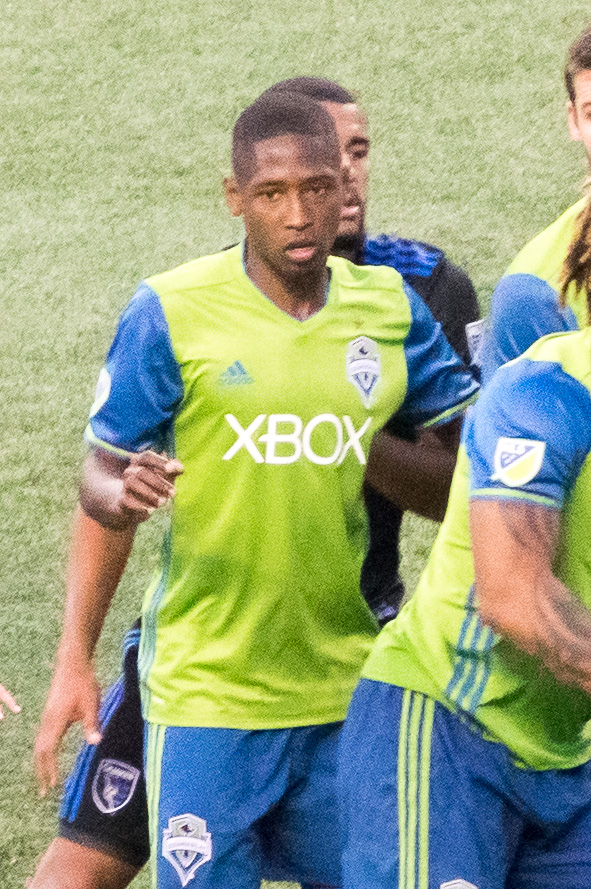
- Leerdam with the Seattle Sounders FC in 2017

Personal information
- Full name: Kelvin Walther Gianini Leerdam
- Date of birth: 24 June 1990 (age 36)
- Place of birth: Paramaribo, Suriname
- Height: 1.78 m (5 ft 10 in)
- Position: Right-back

Youth career
- –2005: USV Elinkwijk
- 2005–2008: Feyenoord

Senior career*
Years	Team	Apps	(Gls)
2008–2013	Feyenoord	97	(5)
2013–2017	Vitesse	89	(12)
2017–2020	Seattle Sounders FC	92	(9)
2021	Inter Miami CF	29	(0)
2022–2023	LA Galaxy	29	(1)
2024–2025	Heracles Almelo	2	(0)

International career^{‡}
2009	Netherlands U19	3	(0)
2010–2013	Netherlands U21	19	(1)
2021–2023	Suriname	18	(0)
- * Club domestic league appearances and goals as of 6 March 2024 ‡ National team caps and goals as of 13 June 2025

Kelvin Leerdam (Dutch pronunciation: [ˈkɛlvɪn leːrˈdɑm]; born 24 June 1990) is a former Surinamese professional footballer.

== Club career ==
=== Early career ===
Leerdam was born in Paramaribo, the capital and largest city of Suriname. Leerdam has a close relationship with his mother and has one younger sister.

Leerdam started his career at local Utrecht club USV Elinkwijk. Feyenoord followed the midfielder for many years and Leerdam eventually joined the Feyenoord youth academy in the season 2005–06.

Coming from an amateur side, Leerdam had a difficult start in the Feyenoord youth. The first two seasons he was mainly used as a substitute. Leerdam joined a successful generation in Feyenoord U17, where he had to compete with players like Leroy Fer, Georginio Wijnaldum and Kevin Wattamaleo for a place on the midfield. After two years, when other players took their chance on a higher level, Leerdam became a regular starter in the U19 team. Thanks to his hard work and dedication, Leerdam eventually made it to Feyenoord's first team squad as well. In January 2007, Leerdam was invited to the first team's training camp in Belek, Turkey, by Feyenoord manager Erwin Koeman. On 6 June 2008, Leerdam signed his first professional contract until 2011.

=== Feyenoord ===
Leerdam had his breakthrough in the season 2008–09. On 13 November 2008, Leerdam made his official debut in Feyenoord's first team. Leerdam replaced Karim El Ahmadi in the 69th minute of the KNVB Cup 5–1 away win against HHC Hardenberg. Leerdam made his Eredivisie debut on 16 November 2008. Leerdam replaced Georginio Wijnaldum in the 87th minute in the away match against FC Twente (1–1). On 27 November 2008, Leerdam also made his European debut. In the UEFA Cup away match against Deportivo la Coruña (3–0), Leerdam replaced Karim El Ahmadi in the 56th minute.

On 1 February 2009, Leerdam had a place in the starting line-up for the first time. When Giovanni van Bronckhorst got injured during the warm-up before the Eredivisie match against N.E.C., Leerdam replaced him as left-back. On 12 April 2009, Leerdam made his first and only goal for Feyenoord, in the home match against Heracles Almelo.

In the season 2009–10, Leerdam was candidate to leave Feyenoord on loan for Excelsior. Because of the departure of the right-backs Theo Lucius, Serginho Greene and Dwight Tiendalli, Leerdam remained at Feyenoord and is mainly used as the stand-in for first team right-back Dani Fernández.

=== Vitesse ===
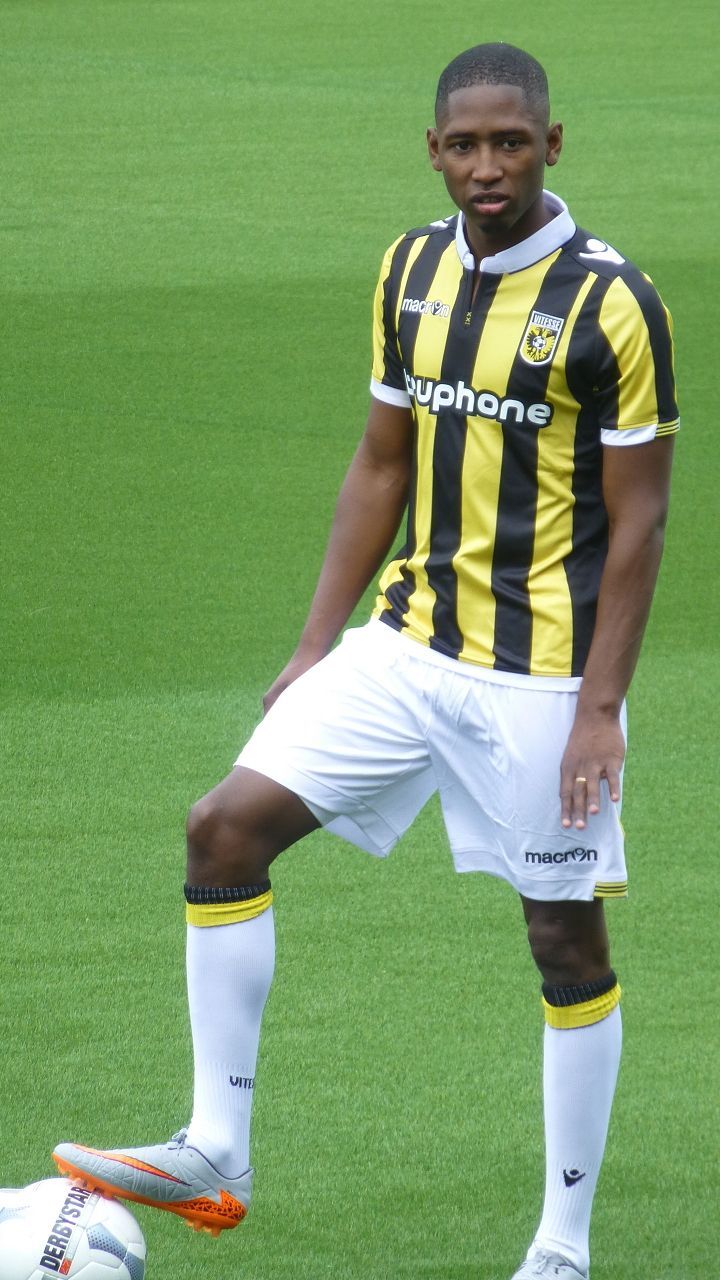
Leerdam with Vitesse Arnhem in 2015

On 14 January 2013, he signed a pre-contract deal with Vitesse. On 2 July, it was announced that Leerdam signed a three-year deal with the Arnhem club. On 1 August 2013, Leerdam made his Vitesse debut in their UEFA Europa League qualifier tie against Petrolul Ploiești, in which Leerdam featured for the entire 90 minutes during the 1–1 draw. Three days later, Leerdam scored on his league debut for Vitesse in their 3–1 home victory over Heracles Almelo, netting the opener in the 27th minute. Leerdam went onto score eight times in total during the 2013–14 campaign and started to attract interest from Vitesse's feeder club, Chelsea during January 2014.

During the 2015–16 campaign, Leerdam was dropped by interim-manager Rob Maas for the foreseeable future after the full-back discredited Vitesse in a 2016 interview. Leerdam therefore, failed to feature again for Vitesse until the following campaign, when Rob Maas was replaced by Henk Fraser. On 31 March 2017, it was announced that Leerdam would leave Vitesse along with Arshak Koryan, Wouter Dronkers and Ewout Gouw at the end of their current deals in June 2017.

He played as Vitesse won the final of the KNVB Beker 2–0 against AZ Alkmaar on 30 April 2017 to lead the club, three-time runners up, to the title for the first time in its 125-year history.

=== Seattle Sounders FC ===
On 1 July 2017, Leerdam joined American side Seattle Sounders FC preceding his release from Vitesse.

On 10 November 2019, Leerdam scored the opening goal for Seattle in a 3–1 home win over Toronto FC in the 2019 MLS Cup Final, after his shot was deflected by Toronto defender Justin Morrow.

=== Inter Miami ===
On 23 March 2021, Leerdam joined fellow Major League Soccer club Inter Miami CF. Following the 2021 season, Leerdam's contract option was declined by Miami.

=== LA Galaxy ===
On 6 January 2022, Leerdamn signed with MLS side LA Galaxy on a two-year deal. Leerdam was released by LA Galaxy following the 2023 season.

== International career ==
Leerdam made his first appearance on international level in the Netherlands U19. The Dutch team missed out on a place at the 2009 UEFA European Under-19 Football Championship in Ukraine by the narrowest of margins. The Netherlands U19 finished second in the qualifying elite round behind Slovenia U19, with one goal difference.

Leerdam decided to represent Suriname, the country of his birth, at the senior level. He was called up to the Suriname national team for the first time in November 2019. He made his debut on 24 March 2021 in a World Cup qualifier against the Cayman Islands. On 25 June 2021 Leerdam was called up to the Suriname squad for the 2021 CONCACAF Gold Cup.

== Career statistics ==
=== Club ===
As of match played 2 December 2020

Club	Season	League			Cup		Continental		Other		Total	
Club	Season	Division	Apps	Goals	Apps	Goals	Apps	Goals	Apps	Goals	Apps	Goals
Feyenoord	2008–09	Eredivisie	16	1	1	0	2 (Note: Appearance(s) in UEFA Cup)	0	2 (Note: Appearance(s) in Eredivisie European play-offs)	0	21	1
Feyenoord	2009–10	Eredivisie	17	0	3	0	—		—		20	0
Feyenoord	2010–11	Eredivisie	22	3	1	0	1 (Note: Appearance(s) in UEFA Europa League)	0	—		24	3
Feyenoord	2011–12	Eredivisie	31	1	1	0	—		—		32	1
Feyenoord	2012–13	Eredivisie	11	0	1	0	4 (Note: Two appearances in UEFA Champions League, two in UEFA Europa League)	0	—		16	0
Feyenoord	Total		97	5	7	0	7	0	2	0	107	5
Vitesse	2013–14	Eredivisie	26	8	2	0	2	0	2	0	32	8
Vitesse	2014–15	Eredivisie	20	2	3	0	—		—		23	2
Vitesse	2015–16	Eredivisie	15	1	1	0	2	0	—		18	1
Vitesse	2016–17	Eredivisie	28	1	5	1	—		—		33	2
Vitesse	Total		89	12	11	1	4	0	2	0	106	13
Seattle Sounders FC	2017	Major League Soccer	15	1	—		—		5	0	20	1
Seattle Sounders FC	2018	Major League Soccer	26	0	—		1	0	2	0	29	0
Seattle Sounders FC	2019	Major League Soccer	29	5	1	0	—		4 (Note: Appearance(s) in MLS Cup)	1	34	6
Seattle Sounders FC	2020	Major League Soccer	22	3	—		2	0	1	0	25	3
Seattle Sounders FC	Total		92	9	1	0	3	0	12	1	103	10
Career total			278	26	19	1	14	0	16	1	327	28

=== International ===
As of match played 13 June 2025

Appearances and goals by national team and year
National team	Year	Apps	Goals
Suriname	2021	7	0
Suriname	2022	5	0
Suriname	2023	6	0
Suriname	2024	0	0
Suriname	2025	0	0
Total		18	0

== Honours ==
Vitesse

- KNVB Cup: 2016–17

Seattle Sounders FC

- MLS Cup: 2019
