= 2016 Fox Sports Cup =

Tournament details
- Host country: Netherlands
- Dates: 21–23 July
- Teams: 4 (from 1 confederation)
- Venue: 1 (in 1 host city)

Final positions
- Champions: (Netherlands) PSV Eindhoven (1st title)
- Runners-up: (England) West Bromwich Albion
- Third place: (Portugal) Porto
- Fourth place: (Netherlands) Vitesse

Tournament statistics
- Matches played: 3
- Goals scored: 9 (3 per match)
- Top scorer(s): (Netherlands) Adam Maher (Portugal) André Silva (England) Callum McManaman (Netherlands) Davy Pröpper (Mexico) Jesús Corona (England) Lewis Baker (Brazil) Nathan (Venezuela) Salomón Rondón (1 goal)

The 2016 Fox Sports Cup was a summer football friendly tournament organized by the Dutch Eredivisie and Match IQ. It was hosted by Vitesse at the GelreDome in Arnhem, from 21 to 23 July 2016. The three other European teams that took part were: Porto (Portugal), PSV Eindhoven (Netherlands), and West Bromwich Albion (England). It was sponsored by Fox Sports Netherlands.

== Overview ==
=== Participants ===
Nation	Team	Location	Confederation	League
Portugal	Porto	Porto	UEFA	Primeira Liga
Netherlands	PSV Eindhoven	Eindhoven	UEFA	Eredivisie
Netherlands	Vitesse	Arnhem	UEFA	Eredivisie
England	West Bromwich Albion	West Bromwich	UEFA	Premier League

=== Standings ===
Three points were awarded for a win, one for a draw and none for a loss. An additional point was awarded for every goal scored.

Rank	Team	GP	W	D	L	GF	GA	GD	Pts
1	(Netherlands) PSV Eindhoven	1	1	0	0	3	0	3	6
2	(England) West Bromwich Albion	1	1	0	0	2	1	1	5
3	(Portugal) Porto	2	1	0	1	2	4	-2	5
4	(Netherlands) Vitesse	2	0	0	2	2	4	-2	2

=== Matches ===
21 July	Vitesse (Netherlands)	1–2	(England) West Bromwich Albion	Arnhem, Netherlands
18:30 CEST	Nathan 57'	Report	S. Rondón 26'; C. McManaman 70'	Stadium: GelreDome

21 July	Porto (Portugal)	0–3	(Netherlands) PSV Eindhoven	Arnhem, Netherlands
21:00 CEST		Report	D. Pröpper 23'; Felipe 34' (o.g.); A. Maher 76'	Stadium: GelreDome

23 July	Vitesse (Netherlands)	1–2	(Portugal) Porto	Arnhem, Netherlands
15:30 CEST	L. Baker 17'	Report	J. Corona 78'; A. Silva 82'	Stadium: GelreDome

23 July	West Bromwich Albion (England)	Cancelled (Note: Match postponed for security reasons. Match was not rescheduled or replaced.)	(Netherlands) PSV Eindhoven	Arnhem, Netherlands
18:00 CEST		Report		Stadium: GelreDome

=== Goalscorers ===
Rank	Name	Team	Goals
1	(Netherlands) Adam Maher	(Netherlands) PSV Eindhoven	1
1	(Portugal) André Silva	(Portugal) Porto	1
1	(England) Callum McManaman	(England) West Bromwich Albion	1
1	(Netherlands) Davy Pröpper	(Netherlands) PSV Eindhoven	1
1	(Mexico) Jesús Corona	(Portugal) Porto	1
1	(England) Lewis Baker	(Netherlands) Vitesse	1
1	(Brazil) Nathan	(Netherlands) Vitesse	1
1	(Venezuela) Salomón Rondón	(England) West Bromwich Albion	1
O.G.	(Brazil) Felipe	(Portugal) Porto	1

== Media coverage ==
Market	Countries	Broadcast partner	Ref
Argentina	1	ESPN Latin America (Spanish) (selected games)	
Belize	1	ESPN (English) (selected games)	
Bolivia	1	ESPN Latin America (Spanish) (selected games)	
Bosnia and Herzegovina	1	Arena Sport (Bosnian) (selected games)	
Chile	1	ESPN Latin America (Spanish) (selected games)	
Colombia	1	ESPN Latin America (Spanish) (selected games)	
Croatia	1	Arena Sport (Croatian) (selected games)	
Ecuador	1	ESPN Latin America (Spanish) (selected games)	
El Salvador	1	ESPN Latin America (Spanish) (selected games)	
International	195	Bet365 (N/A) (selected games) bwin (N/A) (selected games)	
Mexico	1	ESPN Mexico (Spanish) (selected games)	
Montenegro	1	Arena Sport (Montenegrin) (selected games)	
Netherlands	1	Fox Sports Netherlands (Dutch)	
Paraguay	1	ESPN Latin America (Spanish) (selected games)	
Peru	1	ESPN Latin America (Spanish) (selected games)	
Portugal	1	Sport TV (Portuguese) (selected games)	
Serbia	1	Arena Sport (Serbian) (selected games)	
Slovenia	1	Šport TV (Slovenian) (selected games)	
Uruguay	1	ESPN Latin America (Spanish) (selected games)	
Venezuela	1	ESPN Latin America (Spanish) (selected games)	
Total countries	195		
