= Guram Kashia =

Georgian footballer (born 1987)

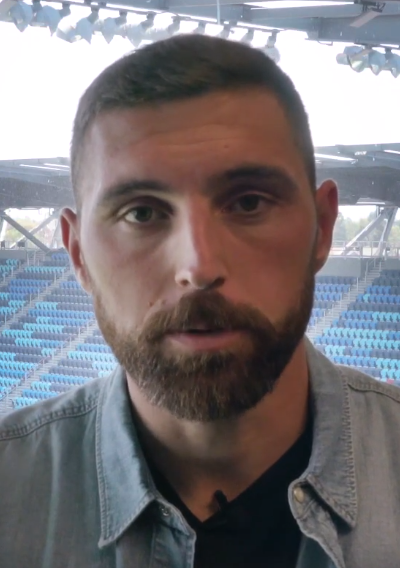
- Kashia in 2019

Personal information
- Date of birth: 4 July 1987 (age 39)
- Place of birth: Tbilisi, Georgian SSR, Soviet Union
- Height: 1.86 m (6 ft 1 in)
- Position: Centre-back

Youth career
- 2003–2006: Dinamo Tbilisi

Senior career*
Years	Team	Apps	(Gls)
2006–2010	Dinamo Tbilisi	91	(12)
2010–2018	Vitesse	244	(20)
2018–2020	San Jose Earthquakes	44	(0)
2021	Locomotive Tbilisi	16	(4)
2021–2026	Slovan Bratislava	111	(9)

International career^{‡}
2007–2009	Georgia U21	10	(2)
2009–2026	Georgia	129	(3)
- * Club domestic league appearances and goals as of 18:00, 2 June 2026 (UTC) ‡ National team caps and goals as of 2 June 2026 (UTC)

Guram Kashia (Order of Honor) (Georgian: გურამ კაშია, romanized: guram k'ashia, pronounced [ɡuɾam kʼaʃia]; born 4 July 1987) is a Georgian former professional footballer who played as an centre-back.

Developed at Dinamo Tbilisi, Kashia spent most of his career at Dutch Eredivisie club Vitesse, where he was captain. In the Netherlands for eight years, he played 292 official matches (24 goals) and won the KNVB Cup in 2017.

Kashia is the five-time winner of the Slovak top league and the Georgia national team's most capped player. He was twice recognized as Footballer of the Year in Georgia.

== Club career ==
=== Early career and MLS ===
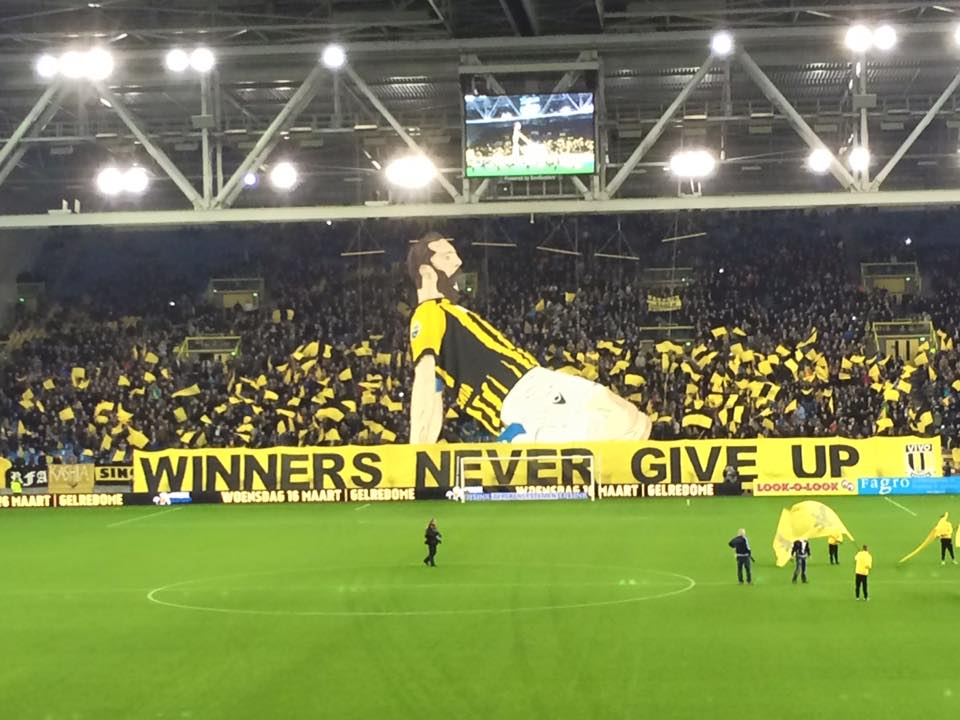
A tifo made by Vitesse fans in celebration of Kashia in 2016.

Kashia began his career in Dinamo Tbilisi. He signed for Dutch club Vitesse in 2010 to become a regular member of the starting line-up of the club. Kashia was named club captain two years later. During his career at Vitesse, He amassed a total of 292 matches. In August 2015, Kashia was named Best Player of August in Eredivisie.

Kashia led Vitesse to the domestic KNVB Cup in 2016–17, starting all except one of their six games and recording a goal and an assist. In his five starts, the club defeated their opponents 12–2, including a 2–0 victory against eventual league champions Feyenoord Rotterdam in the quarterfinals. In October 2017, Kashia wore a rainbow-striped captain's armband for Vitesse against Heracles Almelo in support of LGBT rights, leading to a backlash in his own country and calls for him to step down from the Georgian national team. His name was also transliterated as Goeram Kasjia in Dutch.

On 14 June 2018, Kashia joined Major League Soccer club San Jose Earthquakes on a multi-year contract, joining compatriot and close friend Valeri Qazaishvili. The club rejected its contract extension with Kashia following their 2020 season.

=== Locomotive Tbilisi and Slovan Bratislava ===
Kashia transferred to Locomotive Tbilisi in 2021 before moving to Slovan Bratislava later the same year. He was a regular squad member of the team which continued winning the Slovak First Football League title. Kashia's contribution led him to receive Team of the Season award three times in a row. He signed a new year-long contract with Slovan on 27 June 2024.

On 27 November 2025, Kashia netted an equalizer in a UEFA Conference League 2–1 win over Rayo Vallecano, becoming Player of the Match. It was his last European goal, scored at 38 years and four months.

Kashia's five-year career with Slovan came to an end in May 2026. During this period, he lifted the national league trophy five times and played more than 200 matches across all competitions for the team.

== International career ==
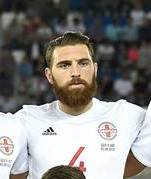
Kashia with the Georgian national team in 2016.

Kashia debuted for Georgia on 1 April 2009 in an exhibition game against Montenegro. In October 2012, he scored Georgia's only goal against Finland in a 2014 World Cup qualification.

Kashia was named Georgian Footballer of the Year twice, in 2012 and in 2013. As of 14 June 2018, he is captain of his national football team. On 26 September 2022, Kashia played his 100th match for Georgia in the Nations League game against Gibraltar. He is the most-capped Georgian footballer of all time.

Kashia took part in all of Georgia's matches in both the UEFA Euro 2024 qualifying stages and Euro 2024 championship completely. He received the Order of Honour with the squad the same year on 2 July.

On 23 March 2026, Kashia announced that he would retire from international football after a friendly home game against Romania on 2 June. He made his 129th international appearance in a 1–1 draw against Romania, finishing as his country's most-capped player.

== Personal life ==
Kashia's father was a rugby player who wanted his younger son to follow his path, but Guram, initially fond of basketball, came under the influence of his elder brother Shota to begin playing football as a child. They both wore Number 37 jerseys for their clubs.

While playing for Vitesse in 2017, Kashia wore a rainbow armband as part of the Dutch initiative Coming Out Day. His show of support for gay rights led to protests outside the Georgian Football Federation's headquarters demanding his removal from the national team, at which eight people were arrested. He described himself as being "proud to support equal rights". In August 2018, he became the inaugural recipient of UEFA's #EqualGame award for his pro-LGBT rights stand. He did not attend the awards ceremony in Monaco due to his club commitments with San Jose, but submitted a video acceptance speech in which he said: "I believe in equality for everyone, no matter what you believe in, who you love or who you are...I will always keep defending equality and equal rights for everyone, wherever I will play." In December 2018, Kashia received the Presidential Order of Excellence from Georgian president Giorgi Margvelashvili.

Kashia is outspoken about the ongoing illegal Russian occupation of Georgia following the 2008 Russo-Georgian War.

He obtained his U.S. green card in July 2019, qualifying him as a domestic player for MLS roster purposes.

== Career statistics ==
=== Club ===
As of match played 16 May 2026

Appearances and goals by club, season and competition
Club	Season	League			Cup		Continental (Note: Includes U.S. Open Cup, UEFA Champions League, UEFA Europa League, UEFA Europa Conference League)		Other (Note: Includes European competition play-offs and Johan Cruyff Shield, Georgian Super Cup)		Total	
Club	Season	Division	Apps	Goals	Apps	Goals	Apps	Goals	Apps	Goals	Apps	Goals
Dinamo Tbilisi	2006–07	Umaglesi Liga	11	2	0	0	—		—		11	2
Dinamo Tbilisi	2007–08	Umaglesi Liga	15	1	0	0	3 (Note: Appearances in UEFA Europa League)	0	0	0	18	1
Dinamo Tbilisi	2008–09	Umaglesi Liga	29	1	1	0	4 (Note: Appearances in UEFA Champions League)	1	1 (Note: Appearance in Georgian Super Cup)	0	35	2
Dinamo Tbilisi	2009–10	Umaglesi Liga	33	8	6	1	4	1	1	0	44	10
Dinamo Tbilisi	2010–11	Umaglesi Liga	3	0	0	0	4	0	0	0	7	0
Dinamo Tbilisi	Total		91	12	7	1	18	1	2	0	115	15
Vitesse	2010–11	Eredivisie	28	3	3	0	—		—		31	3
Vitesse	2011–12	Eredivisie	32	3	3	0	—		4 (Note: Appearances in European play-offs)	0	39	3
Vitesse	2012–13	Eredivisie	33	2	4	0	4	0	0	0	41	2
Vitesse	2013–14	Eredivisie	32	2	2	1	2	0	1	0	37	3
Vitesse	2014–15	Eredivisie	26	1	2	0	0	0	4	1	32	2
Vitesse	2015–16	Eredivisie	27	5	1	0	2	0	0	0	30	5
Vitesse	2016–17	Eredivisie	34	1	5	1	—		—		39	2
Vitesse	2017–18	Eredivisie	32	3	0	0	6	0	5	1	43	4
Vitesse	Total		244	20	20	2	14	0	14	2	292	24
San Jose Earthquakes	2018	MLS	12	0	0	0	—		—		12	0
San Jose Earthquakes	2019	MLS	23	0	1	0	—		—		24	0
San Jose Earthquakes	2020	MLS	8	0	0	0	—		—		8	0
San Jose Earthquakes	Total		44	0	1	0	—		—		45	0
Locomotive Tbilisi	2021	Erovnuli Liga	16	4	1	0	—		—		17	4
Slovan Bratislava	2021–22	Slovak Super Liga	24	2	3	0	13 (Note: Eight appearances in UEFA Champions League, five appearances in UEFA Conference League)	1	0	0	40	3
Slovan Bratislava	2022–23	Slovak Super Liga	22	2	3	0	15 (Note: Four appearances in UEFA Champions League, two appearances in UEFA Europa League, Nine appearances in UEFA Conference League)	2	0	0	40	4
Slovan Bratislava	2023–24	Slovak Super Liga	24	2	2	0	13 (Note: Six appearances in UEFA Champions League, seven appearances in UEFA Conference League)	0	0	0	39	2
Slovan Bratislava	2024–25	Slovak Super Liga	26	2	3	2	16	0	0	0	43	4
Slovan Bratislava	2025–26	Slovak Super Liga	15	1	1	0	12 (Note: Four appearances in UEFA Champions League, two appearances in UEFA Europa League, six appearances and one goal in UEFA Conference League)	0	—		28	2
Slovan Bratislava	Total		111	9	12	2	69	4	0	0	192	15
Career total			503	45	43	5	104	7	16	2	661	58

=== International ===
As of match played 2 June 2026

Appearances and goals by national team and year
National team	Year	Apps	Goals
Georgia	2009	4	0
Georgia	2010	2	0
Georgia	2011	6	0
Georgia	2012	8	1
Georgia	2013	8	0
Georgia	2014	5	0
Georgia	2015	10	0
Georgia	2016	8	0
Georgia	2017	10	0
Georgia	2018	9	1
Georgia	2019	9	0
Georgia	2020	3	0
Georgia	2021	10	0
Georgia	2022	9	1
Georgia	2023	9	0
Georgia	2024	13	0
Georgia	2025	5	0
Georgia	2026	1	0
Total		129	3

Scores and results list Georgia's goal tally first, score column indicates score after each Kashia goal.

List of international goals scored by Guram Kashia
No.	Date	Venue	Opponent	Score	Result	Competition
1	12 October 2012	Helsinki Olympic Stadium, Helsinki, Finland	Finland	1–0	1–1	2014 FIFA World Cup qualification
2	1 June 2018	Silberstadt Arena Schwaz, Schwaz, Austria	Malta	1–0	1–0	Friendly
3	2 June 2022	Boris Paichadze Dinamo Arena, Tbilisi, Georgia	Gibraltar	2–0	4–0	2022–23 UEFA Nations League C

== Honours ==
Dinamo Tbilisi

- Georgian League: 2007–08
- Georgian Cup: 2008–09
- Georgian Super Cup: 2008

Vitesse

- KNVB Cup: 2016–17

Slovan Bratislava

- Fortuna Liga: 2021–22, 2022–23, 2023–24, 2024–25, 2025–26

Individual

- Presidential order of excellence for unconditional support of LGBTQ+ community: 2018
- Order of Honour: 2024
- UEFA#EqualGame Award: 2018
- Georgian Footballer of the Year: 2012, 2013
- Vitesse player of the Year: 2015–16
- Slovak Super Liga Team of the Season: 2021–22, 2022–23, 2023–24
