= Nathan (footballer, born 1996) =

Brazilian footballer

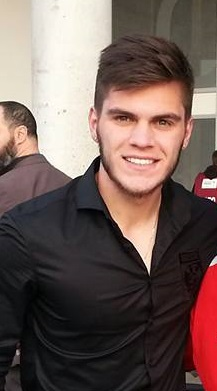
- Nathan in 2016

Personal information
- Full name: Nathan Allan de Souza
- Date of birth: 13 March 1996 (age 30)
- Place of birth: Blumenau, Brazil
- Height: 1.77 m (5 ft 10 in)
- Position: Midfielder

Youth career
- 2009–2013: Atlético Paranaense

Senior career*
Years	Team	Apps	(Gls)
2013–2015	Atlético Paranaense	20	(1)
2015–2020	Chelsea	0	(0)
2015–2017	→ Vitesse (loan)	45	(6)
2017–2018	→ Amiens (loan)	1	(0)
2018	→ Belenenses (loan)	13	(2)
2018–2020	→ Atlético Mineiro (loan)	37	(5)
2020–2023	Atlético Mineiro	62	(8)
2022	→ Fluminense (loan)	30	(2)
2023–2025	Grêmio	36	(1)
2025	Remo	10	(0)

International career^{‡}
2013–2014	Brazil U17	5	(5)
2014–2015	Brazil U20	14	(3)
- * Club domestic league appearances and goals as of 15 December 2025 ‡ National team caps and goals as of 2 June 2015

Nathan Allan de Souza (born 13 March 1996), simply known as Nathan, is a Brazilian professional footballer. Mainly an attacking midfielder, he has also been deployed throughout his career in a central midfield role, as well as a winger and a second striker.

== Club career ==
=== Atlético Paranaense ===
Born in Blumenau, Santa Catarina, Nathan joined Atlético Paranaense's prolific youth setup in 2009, at the age of 13. He was promoted to the main squad in 2014, initially appearing with the under-23 team in Campeonato Paranaense. His debut came on 29 January in the first stage of the Copa Libertadores away at Sporting Cristal, playing ten minutes in place of Marcelo Cirino in a 2–1 loss. A week later in the second leg, he came on as a substitute and had his attempt saved in the penalty shootout, although his team advanced nonetheless.

Nathan made his Série A debut on 22 May, coming on as a second-half substitute for Paulinho Dias in a 1–1 away draw against Corinthians. In October, after rejecting a contract renewal, the club and the player went to court, with him being demoted back to the under-23s.

=== Chelsea ===
On 1 July 2015, Nathan joined Chelsea for an undisclosed fee rumoured to be in the region of £4.5 million, having initially confirming he had signed in May 2015.

==== Loan to Vitesse ====
Nine days after signing for Chelsea, it was announced that Nathan was join to Dutch side Vitesse Arnhem on loan, along with Isaiah Brown and Lewis Baker. He made his debut on 6 August in a UEFA Europa League third qualifying round second leg against Southampton at the GelreDome, replacing Baker for the final 21 minutes of a 2–0 home defeat for a 5–0 aggregate elimination. He made his Eredivisie debut three days later in a 1–1 draw against Willem II, replacing Brown with 25 minutes to spare. On 14 August he scored his first goal, again as a substitute, concluding a 3–0 home win over Roda JC. On 4 October, Nathan scored his second goal for the club in a 5–0 victory over FC Groningen.

On 9 June 2016, Nathan's loan at Vitesse was extended for the 2016–17 campaign. On the opening day of 2016–17 season, Nathan scored a brace against Willem II in a 4–1 win.

He played as Vitesse won the final of the KNVB Beker 2–0 against AZ Alkmaar on 30 April 2017 to lead the club, three-time runners up, to the title for the first time in its 125-year history.

==== Loan to Amiens ====
On 31 August 2017, Nathan joined Ligue 1 side Amiens on a season-long loan. On 17 September 2017, he made his debut during Amiens' 2–0 away defeat against Marseille, replacing Bongani Zungu in the 81st minute. Nathan went onto feature twice more in the Coupe de la Ligue, before terminating his loan spell in January and returning to Chelsea.

==== Loan to Belenenses ====
Following his return from Amiens, Nathan opted to join Portuguese side Belenenses on loan for the remainder of the campaign in January 2018.

=== Atlético Mineiro ===
On 24 July 2018, Nathan agreed a deal to return to his native country to join Atlético Mineiro on a season-long loan, which was extended until mid-2020. On 1 July 2020, he joined the club on a permanent basis, signing a four-year contract.

==== Loan to Fluminense ====
On 4 January 2022, Nathan joined Fluminense on a season-long loan.

=== Grêmio ===
On 10 April 2023, Nathan joined Grêmio on a deal running until December 2025.

== International career ==
Nathan has represented Brazil in both under-17 and under-20 levels. He made his debut with the under-17s during the 2013 FIFA U-17 World Cup, scoring five goals, including braces in the 6–1 group stage wins against Slovakia and hosts United Arab Emirates. He scored their equaliser in the 1–1 draw against holders Mexico in the quarter-finals and netted in the subsequent penalty shootout, but Mexico won 11–10. Nathan was voted as the second best player of the tournament, winning the Silver Ball.

He was also included in Alexandre Gallo's 23-man squad for the 2015 South American Youth Championship held in Uruguay. Nathan appeared in all matches during the competition, scoring his first goal on 4 February, netting the first in a 5–0 routing over Peru.

== Style of play ==
Tim Vickery, a reporter on South American football, called Nathan "a playmaker who can thread a little pass". He said that although he performed well as an under-17 international, his performances at under-20 were below standard, concluding that "it’s difficult to see what he has done in the last season to justify interest from Chelsea."

== Career statistics ==
As of 10 March 2023

Appearances and goals by club, season and competition
Club	Season	League			State League		National cup		League cup		Continental		Other		Total	
Club	Season	Division	Apps	Goals	Apps	Goals	Apps	Goals	Apps	Goals	Apps	Goals	Apps	Goals	Apps	Goals
Atlético Paranaense	2013	Série A	11	0	—		0	0	—		0	0	—		11	0
Atlético Paranaense	2014	Série A	0	0	7 (Note: Appearances in Campeonato Paranaense)	1	2 (Note: Appearances in Copa do Brasil)	0	—		2 (Note: Appearances in Copa Libertadores)	0	—		11	1
Atlético Paranaense	2015	Série A	0	0	2	0	0	0	—		0	0	—		2	0
Atlético Paranaense	Total		11	0	9	1	2	0	0	0	2	0	0	0	24	1
Chelsea	2015–16	Premier League	0	0	—		0	0	0	0	0	0	0	0	0	0
Vitesse	2015–16	Eredivisie	18	2	—		0	0	—		1 (Note: Appearance in UEFA Europa League)	0	—		19	2
Vitesse	2016–17	Eredivisie	27	4	—		5 (Note: Appearances in KNVB Cup)	1	—		0	0	—		32	5
Vitesse	Total		45	6	0	0	5	1	0	0	1	0	0	0	51	7
Amiens	2017–18	Ligue 1	1	0	—		—		2 (Note: Appearances in Coupe de la Ligue)	0	—		—		3	0
Amiens II	2017–18	Championnat National 3	2	0	—		—		—		—		—		2	0
Belenenses	2017–18	Primeira Liga	13	2	—		0	0	—		—		—		13	2
Atlético Mineiro	2018	Série A	7	0	—		0	0	—		0	0	—		7	0
Atlético Mineiro	2019	Série A	20	4	6 (Note: Appearances in Campeonato Mineiro)	1	1	0	—		7 (Note: Four appearances in Copa Libertadores, three appearances in Copa Sudamericana)	0	—		34	5
Atlético Mineiro	2020	Série A	27	3	8	3	2	0	—		1 (Note: Appearance in Copa Sudamericana)	0	—		38	6
Atlético Mineiro	2021	Série A	22	2	7	0	5	0	—		5	1	—		39	3
Atlético Mineiro	2023	Série A	0	0	2	0	0	0	—		0	0	—		2	0
Atlético Mineiro	Total		76	9	23	4	8	0	0	0	13	1	0	0	120	14
Fluminense	2022	Série A	24	2	6 (Note: Appearances in Campeonato Carioca)	0	4	1	—		4 (Note: One appearance in Copa Libertadores, three appearances in Copa Sudamericana)	0	—		38	3
Grêmio	2023	Série A	0	0	—		0	0	—		0	0	—		0	0
Career total			172	19	38	5	19	2	2	0	20	1	0	0	251	27

== Honours ==
Vitesse

- KNVB Cup: 2016–17

Atlético Mineiro

- Campeonato Brasileiro Série A: 2021
- Copa do Brasil: 2021
- Campeonato Mineiro: 2020, 2021, 2023

Grêmio

- Campeonato Gaúcho: 2024

Individual

- FIFA U-17 World Cup Silver Ball: 2013
- Campeonato Mineiro Team of the Year: 2020
