= Arshak Koryan =

Russian professional footballer (born 1995)

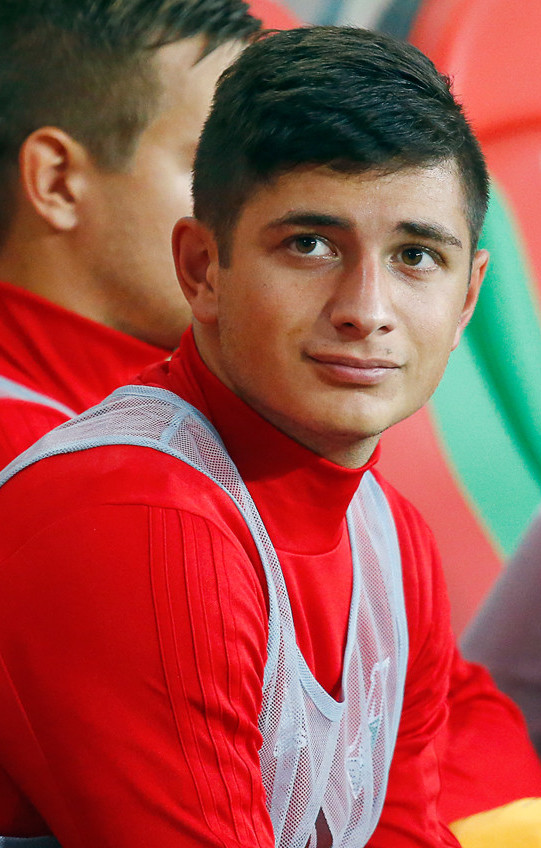
- Koryan with Lokomotiv in 2017

Personal information
- Full name: Arshak Rafaelyevich Koryan
- Date of birth: 17 June 1995 (age 31)
- Place of birth: Sochi, Russia
- Height: 1.70 m (5 ft 7 in)
- Position: Winger

Team information
- Current team: SKA-Khabarovsk
- Number: 77

Youth career
- 2004: Sochi-04
- 2005–2014: Lokomotiv Moscow
- 2015–2016: Vitesse

Senior career*
Years	Team	Apps	(Gls)
2016–2017	Vitesse	3	(0)
2016–2017	→ Jong Vitesse	20	(10)
2017–2019	Lokomotiv Moscow	3	(0)
2018–2019	→ Khimki (loan)	37	(5)
2019–2024	Khimki	63	(12)
2021–2022	→ Orenburg (loan)	21	(2)
2022–2023	→ Alania Vladikavkaz (loan)	11	(1)
2022–2023	→ Alania-2 Vladikavkaz (loan)	1	(0)
2024	Torpedo Moscow	19	(3)
2025–2026	Rodina Moscow	33	(0)
2026–	SKA-Khabarovsk	0	(0)

International career^{‡}
2011	Russia U-16	2	(0)
2011	Armenia U-17	2	(0)
2011–2012	Russia U-17	7	(1)
2013	Russia U-18	5	(1)
2013–2014	Russia U-19	9	(1)
2014–2016	Russia U-21	16	(3)
2020–2021	Armenia	5	(0)
- * Club domestic league appearances and goals as of 16 May 2026 ‡ National team caps and goals as of 10 September 2021

Arshak Rafaelyevich Koryan (Armenian: Արշակ Կորյան; Russian: Аршак Рафаэльевич Корян; born 17 June 1995) is an Armenian professional footballer who plays as a winger (left or right) for SKA-Khabarovsk.

== Club career ==
Born in Sochi, Koryan started his career at Lokomotiv Moscow. After progressing through the club's youth system, he was an unused substitute in a 0–1 away loss against CSKA Moscow.

On 3 February 2015, Koryan signed for Dutch Eredivisie club Vitesse, being initially assigned to Jong Vitesse. On 21 May, he renewed his contract for a further year. On 8 June 2016, Koryan was promoted to the main squad and was assigned the no. 30 shirt. He made his professional debut on 6 August, replacing Mitchell van Bergen in the 81st minute of a 4–1 away win against Willem II. On 31 March 2017, it was announced that Koryan would leave Vitesse along with Wouter Dronkers and Ewout Gouw at the end of their current deals in June 2017.

On 12 July 2017, Koryan returned to Lokomotiv Moscow as a free agent. He left Lokomotiv upon the expiration of his contract on 30 June 2019.

On 1 July 2019, he signed with Khimki. On 4 March 2021, he extended his contract with Khimki.

On 13 August 2021, he joined Orenburg on loan for the 2021–22 season.

On 19 August 2022, Koryan was loaned to Alania Vladikavkaz.

== International career ==
He represented Russia on junior levels. Before the 2020–21 Russian Premier League season, the players from the countries that belong to Eurasian Economic Union (of which Armenia is one), stopped being considered foreign players in Russian leagues (there are restrictions on the number of foreign players per team). He made his debut for Armenia national football team on 5 September 2020 in a UEFA Nations League 1–2 loss against North Macedonia.

== Personal life ==
Koryan is the cousin of the Russian youth international Ruslan Koryan.

== Career statistics ==
As of 16 May 2026

Club	Season	League			Cup		Continental		Other		Total	
Club	Season	Division	Apps	Goals	Apps	Goals	Apps	Goals	Apps	Goals	Apps	Goals
Lokomotiv Moscow	2013–14	Russian Premier League	0	0	0	0	–		–		0	0
Lokomotiv Moscow	2014–15	Russian Premier League	0	0	0	0	–		–		0	0
Lokomotiv Moscow	Total		0	0	0	0	0	0	0	0	0	0
Vitesse	2015–16	Eredivisie	0	0	0	0	0	0	–		0	0
Vitesse	2016–17	Eredivisie	3	0	2	1	–		–		5	1
Vitesse	Total		3	0	2	1	0	0	0	0	5	1
Vitesse II	2016–17	Tweede Divisie	20	10	–		–		–		20	10
Lokomotiv Moscow	2017–18	Russian Premier League	3	0	0	0	0	0	0	0	3	0
Khimki (loan)	2018–19	Russian First League	37	5	2	0	–		5 (Note: Appearances in FNL Cup)	0	44	5
Khimki	2019–20	Russian First League	23	4	6	2	–		5	1	34	7
Khimki	2020–21	Russian Premier League	14	4	0	0	–		–		14	4
Khimki	2021–22	Russian Premier League	1	0	–		–		–		1	0
Khimki	2023–24	Russian First League	25	4	4	0	–		–		29	4
Khimki	Total		63	12	10	2	0	0	5	1	78	15
Orenburg (loan)	2021–22	Russian First League	21	2	2	0	–		1 (Note: Appearance in promotion play-offs)	0	24	2
Alania Vladikavkaz (loan)	2022–23	Russian First League	11	1	3	0	–		–		14	1
Alania-2 Vladikavkaz (loan)	2022–23	Russian Second League	1	0	–		–		–		1	0
Torpedo Moscow	2024–25	Russian First League	19	3	2	0	–		–		21	3
Rodina Moscow	2024–25	Russian First League	12	0	–		–		–		12	0
Rodina Moscow	2025–26	Russian First League	21	0	2	1	–		–		23	1
Rodina Moscow	Total		33	0	2	1	0	0	0	0	35	1
Career total			211	33	23	4	0	0	11	1	245	38

== Honours ==
=== Club ===
Vitesse

- KNVB Cup: 2016–17

Lokomotiv Moscow

- Russian Premier League: 2017–18
