= Gino Bosz =

Dutch footballer

Personal information
- Date of birth: 23 April 1993 (age 33)
- Place of birth: Rotterdam, Netherlands
- Height: 1.83 m (6 ft 0 in)
- Position: Centre back

Team information
- Current team: Robur et Velocitas

Youth career
- UVV Albatross
- 2005–2007: Vitesse
- Go Ahead Eagles
- AGOVV
- 2010–2011: Ballistic United
- 2011–2014: Vitesse

Senior career*
Years	Team	Apps	(Gls)
2011–2015	Vitesse II	46	(12)
2014–2015	Vitesse	1	(0)
2015–2016	Heracles	4	(1)
2016–2017	Cambuur	7	(1)
2017–2018	Jong Vitesse	28	(11)
2018–2020	Go Ahead Eagles	44	(1)
2020	Doxa Drama	0	(0)
2021–2022	TEC	30	(10)
2022	Unicum		
2023–2024	IJsselmeervogels	27	(1)
2024–	Robur et Velocitas		
- * Club domestic league appearances and goals as of 25 May 2024

Gino Bosz (born 23 April 1993) is a Dutch footballer who plays as a centre back for Tweede Klasse club Robur et Velocitas.

== Club career ==
Born in Rotterdam, Bosz joined Vitesse's youth setup in 2011. He was promoted to the main squad in the 2014 summer by manager (and father) Peter Bosz.

Bosz made his first-team – and Eredivisie – debut on 3 October 2014, coming on as a late substitute in a 6–1 home routing over ADO Den Haag. In summer 2015 he left Vitesse for Heracles, only to move on to Cambuur a year later due to a lack of playing time at Heracles.

Following a spell back at Vitesse, Bosz agreed to return to Eerste Divisie side Go Ahead Eagles prior to the 2018–19 campaign. In September 2020, he left them for Greek second-tier side Doxa Drama, only to leave them in January 2021 and joining TEC in summer 2021.

== Personal life ==
Bosz's father, Peter was also a footballer and is the manager at PSV, while his brother Sonny also was a footballer.

== Career statistics ==
As of match played 17 August 2018.

Club	Season	League			KNVB Cup		Europe		Other		Total	
Club	Season	Division	Apps	Goals	Apps	Goals	Apps	Goals	Apps	Goals	Apps	Goals
Vitesse	2013–14	Eredivisie	0	0	0	0	0	0	0	0	0	0
Vitesse	2014–15	Eredivisie	1	0	0	0	—		0	0	1	0
Vitesse	Total		1	0	0	0	0	0	0	0	1	0
Heracles Almelo	2015–16	Eredivisie	4	1	1	0	—		0	0	5	1
Cambuur	2016–17	Eerste Divisie	7	1	1	0	—		0	0	8	1
Vitesse	2017–18	Eredivisie	0	0	0	0	0	0	0	0	0	0
Go Ahead Eagles	2018–19	Eerste Divisie	1	1	0	0	—		0	0	1	1
Career total			13	3	2	0	0	0	0	0	15	3

== Honours ==
Jong Vitesse

- Derde Divisie – Sunday: 2017–18
