= Wouter Dronkers =

Dutch professional footballer

Personal information
- Date of birth: 3 May 1993 (age 33)
- Place of birth: Vlaardingen, Netherlands
- Height: 1.87 m (6 ft 2 in)
- Position: Goalkeeper

Youth career
- SV Excellence
- CVV Willemstad
- –2003: PH Almelo
- 2003–2010: Twente

Senior career*
Years	Team	Apps	(Gls)
2010–2014	Twente	0	(0)
2012–2014	→ Twente II	4	(0)
2014–2017	Vitesse	0	(0)
2014–2017	→ Vitesse II	6	(0)
2018	Boston City FC	0	(0)

International career
2008–2009	Netherlands U15	0	(0)
2009–2010	Netherlands U16	1	(0)
2010–2011	Netherlands U17	4	(0)
2011–2012	Netherlands U18	3	(0)
- * Club domestic league appearances and goals as of 30 March 2018 (UTC)

Wouter Dronkers (born 3 May 1993) is a Dutch retired footballer who played as a goalkeeper. Alongside his athletic career, Dronkers studied medicine.

== Club career ==
After spells with SV Excellence, CVV Willemstad and PH Almelo, Dronkers joined Twente in 2003. On 6 December 2012, Dronkers was named on the bench to face Helsingborgs IF in Twente's UEFA Europa League group stage tie, remaining unused in the 3–1 defeat at De Grolsch Veste. On 9 September 2013, Dronkers made his debut for the Jong Twente side, in their 2–0 away defeat against FC Eindhoven.

After failing to make a breakthrough at Twente, Dronkers joined fellow Eredivisie side Vitesse in August 2014. On 15 December 2016, it was announced that Dronkers would leave Vitesse at the end of the 2016–17 campaign to study at Harvard University in the United States. On 4 March 2017, Dronkers was named as an unused substitute in Vitesse's 3–1 away defeat against PEC Zwolle.

On 29 March 2018, it was announced that Dronkers joined Boston City FC for the 2018 season. Between his release from Vitesse and signing for Boston City FC, Dronkers played along the side of Harvard Club Soccer, at Harvard University. He wishes to become a neurosurgeon. He quit football in 2018.

== International career ==
Dronkers played 4 games for the Netherlands national under-17 football team.
