= Jochem Kamphuis =

Dutch football referee

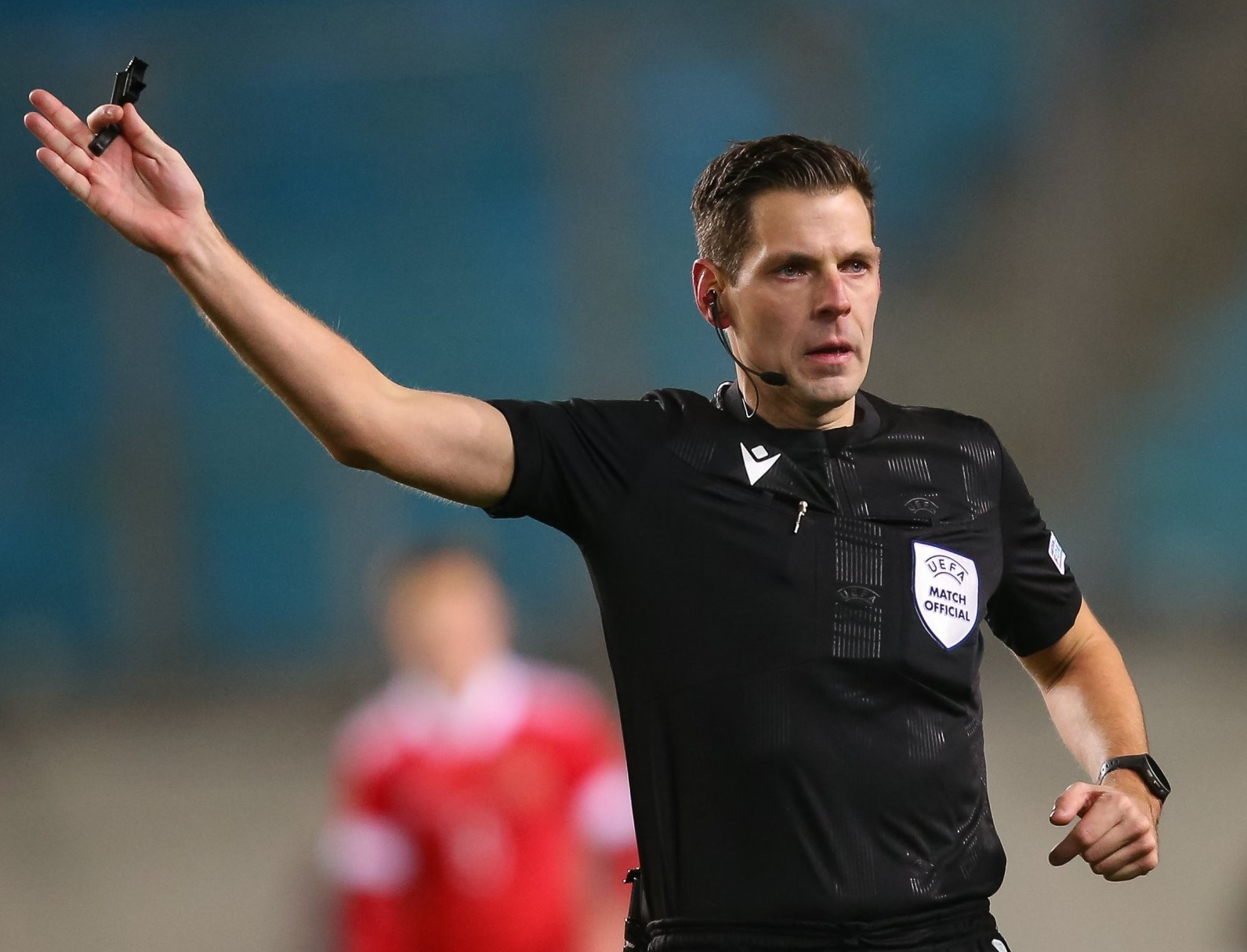
- Kamphuis in 2021
- Born: 11 April 1986 (age 40); Groningen, Netherlands

Domestic
Years	League	Role
2008–	Eerste Divisie	Referee
2011–	Eredivisie	Referee

International
Years	League	Role
2020–	FIFA listed	Referee

Jochem Kamphuis (born 11 April 1986) is a Dutch football referee who officiates in the Eredivisie. He has been a FIFA referee since 2020, and is ranked as a UEFA third category referee.

== Refereeing career ==
In 2008, Kamphuis began officiating in the Eerste Divisie. Three years later, he made his refereeing debut in the top-flight Eredivisie. His first match officiated in the league was on 15 October 2011 between SC Heerenveen and De Graafschap. Kamphuis also officiated matches in the Belgian Second Division and the Saudi Professional League. In 2020, he was put on the FIFA referees list. On 18 August 2020, he was named as the video assistant referee for the 2020 UEFA Europa League Final between Sevilla and Inter Milan.
