= Arnold Kruiswijk =

Dutch footballer

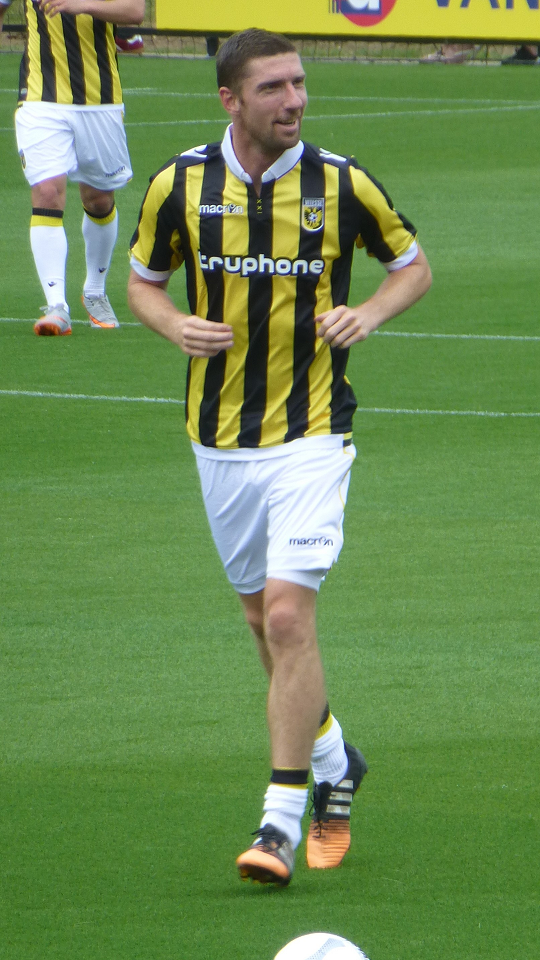
- Kruiswijk with Vitesse in 2015

Personal information
- Full name: Arnold Kruiswijk
- Date of birth: 2 November 1984 (age 42)
- Place of birth: Groningen, Netherlands
- Height: 1.82 m (6 ft 0 in)
- Position: Left back

Youth career
- VV Appingedam
- –2001: Groningen

Senior career*
Years	Team	Apps	(Gls)
2001–2008	Groningen	149	(0)
2008–2010	Anderlecht	17	(0)
2010	→ Roda JC (loan)	17	(0)
2010–2014	Heerenveen	81	(0)
2014–2019	Vitesse	69	(1)

International career
2003–2007	Netherlands U21	25	(0)
Medal record
Men's football
Representing Netherlands
UEFA European Under-21 Championship
Winner	2006 Portugal
Winner	2007 Netherlands
- * Club domestic league appearances and goals

Arnold Kruiswijk (Dutch pronunciation: [ˈɑrnɔlt ˈkrœysʋɛik]; born 2 November 1984) is a former Dutch professional footballer who played as a left back.

== Club career ==
Born in Groningen, Kruiswijk started his career at local side Groningen.

In the 10 September 2006 match against Heracles Almelo, Kruiswijk scored the fastest own goal ever in the Eredivisie, misplacing a back pass to the keeper that ended up in the goal after 9 seconds.

After the 2007–08 season, Kruiswijk moved to the Belgian club RSC Anderlecht.

In January 2010, Kruiswijk went on loan to Dutch side Roda JC until the end of the season. On 21 May 2010 he signed a four-year contract for SC Heerenveen, where he was reunited with his former Groningen-coach Ron Jans. In 2014, he moved to Vitesse.

On 1 July 2014, preceding his release from Heerenveen, Kruiswijk joined fellow Eredivisie side Vitesse. Kruiswijk entered the Dutch history books for a second time on 29 January 2017, when he played 25,128 minutes without scoring a goal for his club thus surpassing the record held by John Veldman. Soon after, on 10 March 2017 in an Eredivisie home fixture against Sparta Rotterdam, he scored his first goal in 362 career appearances.

He played as Vitesse won the final of the KNVB Cup 2–0 against AZ Alkmaar on 30 April 2017 to help the club, 3-time runners up, to the title for the first time in its 125-year history.

He retired in March 2019 due to injury.

== International career ==
In 2006, Kruiswijk was part of the Netherlands U21 squad that won the 2006 UEFA European Under-21 Football Championship in Portugal. A year later at the 2007 UEFA European Under-21 Football Championship held in the Netherlands he was again part of the squad that successfully defended their title and that qualified for the 2008 Summer Olympics by reaching the semi-finals at the tournament.

== Career statistics ==
As of match played 16 January 2018.

Club	Season	League			Cup		Europe		Other		Total	
Club	Season	Division	Apps	Goals	Apps	Goals	Apps	Goals	Apps	Goals	Apps	Goals
Groningen	2001–02	Eredivisie	0	0	1	0	—		—		1	0
Groningen	2002–03	Eredivisie	19	0	1	0	—		—		20	0
Groningen	2003–04	Eredivisie	28	0	2	0	—		—		30	0
Groningen	2004–05	Eredivisie	25	0	0	0	—		—		25	0
Groningen	2005–06	Eredivisie	22	0	0	0	—		—		22	0
Groningen	2006–07	Eredivisie	25	0	1	0	2 (Note: Appearance(s) in UEFA Cup)	0	3 (Note: Appearance(s) in Eredivisie European Play-offs)	0	31	0
Groningen	2007–08	Eredivisie	30	0	2	0	2	0	3	0	37	0
Groningen	Total		149	0	7	0	4	0	6	0	166	0
Anderlecht	2008–09	Belgian First Division	17	0	1	0	1 (Note: Appearance(s) in UEFA Champions League)	0	0	0	19	0
Anderlecht	2009–10	Belgian Pro League	0	0	2	0	1 (Note: Appearance(s) in UEFA Europa League)	0	—		3	0
Anderlecht	Total		17	0	3	0	2	0	0	0	22	0
Roda JC (loan)	2009–10	Eredivisie	17	0	0	0	—		4	0	21	0
Heerenveen	2010–11	Eredivisie	21	0	2	0	—		—		23	0
Heerenveen	2011–12	Eredivisie	14	0	2	0	—		—		16	0
Heerenveen	2012–13	Eredivisie	19	0	2	0	2	0	0	0	23	0
Heerenveen	2013–14	Eredivisie	27	0	1	0	—		2	0	30	0
Heerenveen	Total		81	0	7	0	2	0	2	0	92	0
Vitesse	2014–15	Eredivisie	16	0	2	0	—		0	0	18	0
Vitesse	2015–16	Eredivisie	22	0	0	0	0	0	—		22	0
Vitesse	2016–17	Eredivisie	27	1	4	0	—		—		31	1
Vitesse	2017–18	Eredivisie	4	0	0	0	0	0	1 (Note: Appearance(s) in Johan Cruyff Shield)	0	5	0
Vitesse	2018–19	Eredivisie	0	0	0	0	0	0	—		0	0
Vitesse	Total		69	1	6	0	0	0	1	0	76	1
Career total			333	1	23	0	8	0	13	0	377	1

== Honours ==
=== Club ===
Vitesse

- KNVB Cup: 2016–17
