= 2008–09 FC Volendam season =

Dutch football club season

FC Volendam
2008–09 season
- Manager: Frans Adelaar
- Stadium: Kras Stadion
- Eredivisie: 18th (relegated)
- KNVB Cup: Semi-finals
- Top goalscorer: League: Melvin Platje (7); All: Melvin Platje (10)
- Biggest defeat: Feyenoord 5–0 Volendam; Groningen 5–0 Volendam; NEC 6–1 Volendam

During the 2008–09 season, FC Volendam was relegated from the top flight, the Eredivisie. In addition, the team competed in the KNVB Cup, where it reached the semi-finals.

== Players ==
=== First-team squad ===
Note: Flags indicate national team as defined under FIFA eligibility rules; some limited exceptions apply. Players may hold more than one non-FIFA nationality.

No.	Pos.	Nation	Player
—	GK	NED	Harmen Kuperus
—	GK	NED	Robbin Ruiter
—	GK	NED	Jeroen Verhoeven
—	DF	NED	Tim Bakens
5	DF	NED	Marijn Sterk
12	DF	NED	Maikel van der Werff
—	DF	TUR	Abdülhamit Yıldız
—	MF	NED	Paul de Lange

No.	Pos.	Nation	Player
—	MF	NED	Murat Önal
11	MF	NED	Dominique van Dijk
—	FW	NED	Bernard Hofstede
—	FW	NED	Jack Tuijp
—	FW	NED	Gerson Sheotahul
—	FW	NED	Melvin Platje
—	FW	NED	Rowin van Zaanen

== Competitions ==
=== Overall record ===
Competition	First match	Last match	Starting round	Final position	Record							
Competition	First match	Last match	Starting round	Final position	Pld	W	D	L	GF	GA	GD	Win %
Eredivisie	31 August 2008	10 May 2009	Matchday 1	18th	34	7	8	19	38	67	−29	20.59
KNVB Cup	24 September 2008	21 April 2009	Second round	Semi-finals	5	4	0	1	10	3	+7	80.00
Total					39	11	8	20	48	70	−22	28.21

Source: Competitions

=== Eredivisie ===
==== League table ====
Pos	Team	Pld	W	D	L	GF	GA	GD	Pts	Qualification or relegation
14	ADO Den Haag	34	8	8	18	41	58	−17	32	
15	Heracles	34	7	11	16	35	53	−18	32	
16	Roda JC (O)	34	7	9	18	38	58	−20	30	Qualification to relegation play-offs
17	De Graafschap (R)	34	7	9	18	24	58	−34	30	Qualification to relegation play-offs
18	Volendam (R)	34	7	8	19	38	67	−29	29	Relegation to the Eerste Divisie

Source: ESPN Eredivisie Table
Rules for classification: 1) points; 2) goal difference; 3) number of goals scored.
(O) Play-off winners; (R) Relegated

==== Results summary ====
Overall								Home						Away					
Pld	W	D	L	GF	GA	GD	Pts	W	D	L	GF	GA	GD	W	D	L	GF	GA	GD
34	7	8	19	38	67	−29	29	6	3	8	27	27	0	1	5	11	11	40	−29

Source: Worldfootball

==== Results by round ====
Round	1	2	3	4	5	6	7	8	9	10	11	12	13	14	15	16	17	18	19	20	21	22	23	24	25	26	27	28	29	30	31	32	33	34
Ground	H	A	H	A	H	A	A	H	H	A	A	H	A	H	A	H	A	H	H	A	A	H	A	A	H	H	A	H	H	A	H	A	H	A
Result	L	L	L	L	L	L	L	D	W	L	L	W	L	L	D	W	L	L	L	D	W	L	L	L	D	W	D	D	W	L	W	D	L	D
Position	11	17	18	18	18	18	18	18	18	18	18	18	18	18	18	18	18	18	18	18	18	18	18	18	18	18	17	18	17	18	16	16	17	18

Source: Worldfootball
A = Away; H = Home; W = Win; D = Draw; L = Loss

==== Matches ====
31 August 2008 1	Volendam	2–3	SC Heerenveen	Volendam
	Tuijp 65', 90'		Grindheim 43'; Elyounoussi 68'; Pranjić 87'	Stadium: Kras Stadion; Attendance: 5,201; Referee: Pol van Boekel

13 September 2008 2	Feyenoord	5–0	Volendam	Rotterdam
	Tomasson 14' (pen.), 30' (pen.); Biseswar 74', 82'; Mols 90'			Stadium: De Kuip; Attendance: 42,500; Referee: Ruud Bossen

21 September 2008 3	Volendam	1–2	Twente	Volendam
	Van Zaanen 64'		Janssen 54'; Elia 63'	Stadium: Kras Stadion; Attendance: 5,045; Referee: Reinold Wiedemeijer

27 September 2008 4	PSV	1–0	Volendam	Eindhoven
	Wuytens 73'			Stadium: Philips Stadion; Attendance: 33,000; Referee: Björn Kuipers

5 October 2008 5	Volendam	2–4	NAC Breda	Volendam
	Boots 53'; Tuijp 86'		Kwakman 6'; Amoah 19', 67'; Lurling 90'	Stadium: Kras Stadion; Attendance: 4,988; Referee: Eric Braamhaar

17 October 2008 6	ADO Den Haag	2–0	Volendam	The Hague
	Immers 60'; Meriç 83'			Stadium: ADO Den Haag Stadium; Attendance: 12,000; Referee: Luc Wouters (Belgium)

25 October 2008 7	AZ	3–0	Volendam	Alkmaar
	Martens 15', 82'; El Hamdaoui 76'			Stadium: DSB Stadion; Attendance: 16,413; Referee: Kevin Blom

28 October 2008 8	Volendam	2–2	Willem II	Volendam
				Stadium: Kras Stadion

2 November 2008 9	Volendam	3–1	De Graafschap	Volendam
				Stadium: Kras Stadion

9 November 2008 10	Groningen	5–0	Volendam	Groningen
				Stadium: Euroborg

15 November 2008 11	Sparta Rotterdam	4–0	Volendam	Rotterdam
				Stadium: Het Kasteel

21 November 2008 12	Volendam	3–2	Roda JC	Volendam
				Stadium: Kras Stadion

30 November 2008 13	NEC	6–1	Volendam	Nijmegen
				Stadium: Goffertstadion

7 December 2008 14	Volendam	1–2	Ajax	Volendam
				Stadium: Kras Stadion

14 December 2008 15	Utrecht	0–0	Volendam	Utrecht
				Stadium: Stadion Galgenwaard

21 December 2008 16	Volendam	3–1	Heracles Almelo	Volendam
				Stadium: Kras Stadion

27 December 2008 17	Vitesse	3–1	Volendam	Arnhem
				Stadium: GelreDome

18 January 2009 18	Volendam	0–2	AZ	Volendam
				Stadium: Kras Stadion

25 January 2009 19	Volendam	0–1	ADO Den Haag	Volendam
				Stadium: Kras Stadion

31 January 2009 20	NAC Breda	1–1	Volendam	Breda
				Stadium: Rat Verlegh Stadion

3 February 2009 21	Willem II	1–2	Volendam	Tilburg
				Stadium: Willem II Stadion

8 February 2009 22	Volendam	3–5	PSV	Volendam
				Stadium: Kras Stadion

14 February 2009 23	Twente	2–1	Volendam	Enschede
				Stadium: De Grolsch Veste

22 February 2009 24	Ajax	2–1	Volendam	Amsterdam
				Stadium: Amsterdam ArenA

1 March 2009 25	Volendam	1–1	NEC	Volendam
				Stadium: Kras Stadion

8 March 2009 26	Volendam	1–0	Vitesse	Volendam
				Stadium: Kras Stadion

14 March 2009 27	Heracles Almelo	1–1	Volendam	Almelo
				Stadium: Polman Stadion

22 March 2009 28	Volendam	0–0	Utrecht	Volendam
				Stadium: Kras Stadion

5 April 2009 29	Volendam	2–1	Feyenoord	Volendam
				Stadium: Kras Stadion

12 April 2009 30	SC Heerenveen	1–0	Volendam	Heerenveen
	Elm 53'			Stadium: Abe Lenstra Stadion; Attendance: 25,900; Referee: Richard Liesveld

19 April 2009 31	Volendam	3–0	Sparta Rotterdam	Volendam
14:30	Van Zaanen 33'; De Lange 56' (pen.); Sheotahul 88'		Rose (yellow card) 55' (yellow-red card) 87'	Stadium: Kras Stadion; Attendance: 6,093; Referee: Roelof Luinge

25 April 2009 32	Roda JC	1–1	Volendam	Kerkrade
	Bodor 26', (red card) 40'		De Wit (yellow card) 34' (yellow-red card) 47'; Platje 83'	Stadium: Parkstad Limburg Stadion; Attendance: 17,400; Referee: Jan Wegereef

3 May 2009 33	Volendam	0–1	Groningen	Volendam
			Matavž 90'	Stadium: Kras Stadion; Attendance: 5,917; Referee: Ruud Bossen

10 May 2009 34	De Graafschap	2–2	Volendam	Doetinchem
	Keller 55'; Koning 77' (o.g.)		Sheotahul 64'; Tuijp 68'	Stadium: De Vijverberg; Attendance: 12,600; Referee: Pieter Vink

=== KNVB Cup ===
24 September 2008 Second round	VVV-Venlo	2–3 (a.e.t.)	Volendam	Venlo
				Stadium: De Koel

12 November 2008 Third round	Volendam	1–0 (a.e.t.)	Ajax	Volendam
	Tuijp 111'			Stadium: Kras Stadion; Attendance: 5,224; Referee: Jack van Hulten

21 January 2009 Fourth round	Volendam	3–0	Excelsior	Volendam
				Stadium: Kras Stadion; Referee: Ben Haverkort

5 March 2009 Quarter-finals	Roda JC	2–3 (a.e.t.)	Volendam	Kerkrade
				Stadium: Parkstad Limburg Stadion

22 April 2009 Semi-finals	Volendam	0–2	SC Heerenveen	Volendam
				Stadium: Kras Stadion
