= 2016–17 KNVB Cup =

Tournament details
- Country: Netherlands
- Venue(s): De Kuip, Rotterdam
- Dates: 6 September 2016 – 30 April 2017
- Teams: 64 (103 including preliminaries)

Final positions
- Champions: Vitesse (1st title)
- Runners-up: AZ

Tournament statistics
- Matches played: 63
- Goals scored: 152 (2.41 per match)
- Top goal scorer(s): Lewis Baker (5 goals)

The 2016–17 KNVB Cup was the 99th edition of the Dutch national football annual knockout tournament for the KNVB Cup. 63 teams contested, beginning on 6 September 2016 with the first of six rounds, and ended on 30 April 2017 with the final played at De Kuip in Rotterdam.

This edition was notable for several unicums, which included holding the first test in an official match of a top tier-domestic competition of the Video assistant referee-system. Anouar Kali held the distinction of becoming the first player to receive a red card after an intervention from the video referee in the first round-game between Ajax and his team Willem II.

The defending champions were Feyenoord from the Eredivisie, after beating FC Utrecht 2–1 in the final in the previous season on 24 April 2016. They were unable to defend their title after losing to Vitesse in the quarter-finals.

Vitesse defeated AZ 2–0 in the final to win its first major trophy in the 124-year history of the club.

As winners, Vitesse automatically qualified for the group stage of the 2017–18 edition of the UEFA Europa League. They also participated in the 2017 edition of the Johan Cruyff Shield, the Dutch Supercup match at the start of next season between the Cup winner and the champions of the Eredivisie, Feyenoord.

== Calendar ==
Round	Date
First preliminary round	17 August 2016
Second preliminary round	24 August 2016
First round	20–22 September 2016
Second round	25–27 October 2016
Round of 16	13–15 December 2016
Quarter-finals	24–26 January 2017
Semi-finals	1 and 2 March 2017
Final	30 April 2017

== First round ==
The draw of the first round was done on 27 August 2016. 64 teams participated and played on 20, 21 or 22 September 2016.

20 September 2016	SVV Scheveningen (4)	1–2	FC Emmen (2)	Scheveningen
17:00	T. Peters 31'	Report	C. Peters 33'; Siekman 40'	Stadium: Sportpark Houtrust; Attendance: 355; Referee: Laurens Gerrets

20 September 2016	vv Capelle (4)	0–4	FC Groningen (1)	Capelle aan den IJssel
17:00		Report	Hoesen 10'; Van Weert 15'; Hateboer 65'; Sørloth 79'	Stadium: Sportpark 't Slot; Attendance: 1,500; Referee: Erwin Blank

20 September 2016	FC Rijnvogels (4)	0–1	SC Cambuur (2)	Katwijk
17:00		Report	Barto 89'	Stadium: Sportpark de Kooltuin; Attendance: 550; Referee: Rob Dieperink

20 September 2016	Rijnsburgse Boys (4)	0–2	Almere City FC (2)	Rijnsburg
17:00		Report	Arica 20', 81'	Stadium: Sportpark Middelmors; Attendance: 600; Referee: Sander van der Eijk

20 September 2016	NAC Breda (2)	0–2	VVV-Venlo (2)	Breda
18:30		Report	Hunte 29', 40'	Stadium: Rat Verlegh Stadion; Referee: Jochem Kamphuis

20 September 2016	JVC Cuijk (4)	1–3	Telstar (2)	Cuijk
18:30	Ritzen 64'	Report	Ajnane 14'; Mahmudov 38'; Abdulahi 90+4'	Stadium: Sportpark de Groenendijkse Kampen; Attendance: 400; Referee: Christian Mulder

20 September 2016	Kozakken Boys (3)	3–0	Helmond Sport (2)	Werkendam
20:00	Ignacio 23'; Stout 52'; Pires Tavares 74'	Report		Stadium: Sportpark de Zwaaier; Attendance: 3,000; Referee: Bas Nijhuis

20 September 2016	HHC Hardenberg (3)	2–2 (a.e.t.) (6–7 p)	Jodan Boys (5)	Hardenberg
20:00	Van der Leij 62'; Piljić 113'	Report	Waandels 70'; Akanioui 111'	Stadium: De Boshoek; Attendance: 800; Referee: Stan Teuben
	Penalties
	Bakker (penalty scored); Piljić (penalty missed) van der Leij (penalty scored); Rasevic (penalty scored); Hooiveld (penalty scored); Wigger (penalty scored); Görtz (penalty scored); Zarbaf (penalty missed)		(penalty scored) Marengo; (penalty missed) Bellahcen; (penalty scored) Huntink; (penalty scored) el Idrissi; (penalty scored) Heerkens; (penalty scored) van Loon; (penalty scored) Mimpen; (penalty scored) Chairi

20 September 2016	BVV Barendrecht (3)	0–1	Excelsior (1)	Barendrecht
20:00		Report	Hasselbaink 26'	Stadium: Sportpark de Bongerd; Referee: Martin van den Kerkhof

20 September 2016	EVV (4)	0–3	RKC Waalwijk (2)	Echt
20:00		Report	Benson 53'; Langedijk 67'; Greene 73'	Stadium: Sportpark "In de Bandert"; Attendance: 600; Referee: Ingmar Oostrom

20 September 2016	FC Volendam (2)	3–3 (a.e.t.) (5–4 p)	MVV Maastricht (2)	Volendam
20:00	Tuyp 52', 71', 78'	Report	Pedro 20'; Verheydt 34'; Schroyen 62'	Stadium: Krasstadion; Attendance: 1,094; Referee: Joey Kooij
	Penalties
	Evers (penalty scored); Schilder (penalty scored); Visser (penalty scored); Steltenpool (penalty scored) van Kippersluis (penalty scored)		(penalty scored) Nwakali; (penalty scored) Ciranni; (penalty scored) Martina; (penalty scored) Schroyen; (penalty missed) Loshaj

20 September 2016	FC Den Bosch (2)	2–3	FC Eindhoven (2)	's-Hertogenbosch
20:00	Havar 24'; Bilate 83'	Report	Lieder 11', 79'; Vloet 87'	Stadium: De Vliert; Referee: Martin Perez

20 September 2016	IJsselmeervogels (4)	3–1	Achilles '29 (2)	Spakenburg
20:00	Grot 33'; Akla 68'; Van Hussen 72'	Report	Boogers 84'	Stadium: Sportpark de Westmaat; Attendance: 1,200; Referee: Edwin van de Graaf

20 September 2016	SC Heerenveen (1)	5–1 (a.e.t.)	De Graafschap (2)	Heerenveen
20:45	Veerman 86', 93'; Zeneli 95'; Namli 102'; Schaars 105+1'	Report	Van Overbeek 67'	Stadium: Abe Lenstra Stadion; Referee: Christiaan Bax

21 September 2016	VV Dongen (4)	1–3	Go Ahead Eagles (1)	Dongen
17:00	Mijnhijmer 14'	Report	Schenk 77'; Teijsse 80'; Hendriks 83'	Stadium: Sportpark de Biezen; Attendance: 1,500; Referee: Stijn Berben

21 September 2016	PSV (1)	4–0	Roda JC (1)	Eindhoven
18:30	Pröpper 25', 60'; Pereiro 34'; Narsingh 77'	Report		Stadium: Philips Stadion; Referee: Richard Liesveld

21 September 2016	Excelsior Maassluis (3)	1–3 (a.e.t.)	Heracles Almelo (1)	Maassluis
20:00	Smith 82'	Report	Vermeij 56', 112'; Kuwas 120+3'	Stadium: Lavendelstraat; Attendance: 1,200; Referee: Steven van der Vrande

21 September 2016	N.E.C. (1)	1–1 (a.e.t.) (3–5 p)	ADO Den Haag (1)	Nijmegen
20:00	Breinburg 105' (pen.)	Report	Kastaneer 114'	Stadium: De Goffert; Referee: Siemen Mulder
	Penalties
	Dumić (penalty scored); Golla (penalty scored); Fomitschow (penalty missed) von Haacke (penalty scored)		(penalty scored) Beugelsdijk; (penalty scored) El Mahdioui; (penalty scored) Bakker; (penalty scored) Becker; (penalty scored) Schaken

21 September 2016	Achilles Veen (5)	1–4	VVSB (3)	Veen
20:00	Sülün 81' (pen.)	Report	Parami 33'; Jozić 63'; Serbony 71'; Seghrouchni 74'	Stadium: Sportpark De Hanen Weide; Attendance: 700; Referee: Ed Janssen

21 September 2016	VV UNA (3)	1–0	SV Huizen (4)	Veldhoven
20:00	Van de Gevel 38'	Report		Stadium: Sportpark Zeelst; Attendance: 400; Referee: Edgar Bijl

21 September 2016	De Treffers (3)	0–3	ASWH (4)	Groesbeek
20:00		Report	De Lange 19'; Verhoeve 28'; Deprez 39'	Stadium: Sportpark Zuid; Attendance: 615; Referee: Freek van Herk

21 September 2016	SV Spakenburg (3)	2–1	Fortuna Sittard (2)	Spakenburg
20:00	Pilon 23'; Van den Meiracker 73'	Report	Khalouta 75'	Stadium: Sportpark de Westmaat; Attendance: 2,800; Referee: Johannes Martens

21 September 2016	Koninklijke HFC (3)	6–1	OJC Rosmalen (4)	Haarlem
20:00	Derguti 5'; Van Soest 9', 56'; Wilffert 19'; Sam-Sim 66' (pen.); Postma 90'	Report	Van Mosselveld 48'	Stadium: Spanjaardslaan; Attendance: 350; Referee: Sam Dröge

21 September 2016	DVS '33 (4)	1–4	PEC Zwolle (1)	Ermelo
20:00	Velda 89'	Report	Brock-Madsen 9', 57'; Van Polen 23' (pen.); Achahbar 39'	Stadium: Sportlaan; Attendance: 3,000; Referee: Allard Lindhout

21 September 2016	Sparta Rotterdam (1)	3–1	FC Dordrecht (2)	Rotterdam
20:00	Dijkstra 35'; Verhaar 41'; Kramer 44' (o.g.)	Report	Daniels 62'	Stadium: Het Kasteel; Referee: Reinold Wiedemeijer

21 September 2016	FC Lienden (3)	1–4	AZ (1)	Lienden
20:00	Bendadi 65'	Report	Tanković 37'; Bel Hassani 68', 86'; Mühren 90+3'	Stadium: Sportpark de Abdijhof; Attendance: 1,200; Referee: Dennis Higler

21 September 2016	VV Katwijk (3)	2–1	Harkemase Boys (4)	Katwijk
20:00	Susan 77'; Van den Ban 90+3'	Report	Adams 53'	Stadium: Sportpark de Krom; Attendance: 800; Referee: Clay Ruperti

21 September 2016	AFC Ajax (1)	5–0	Willem II (1)	Amsterdam
20:45	Bazoer 13'; De Ligt 25'; Ziyech 72'; Schöne 82'; Nouri 89'	Report		Stadium: Amsterdam ArenA; Referee: Danny Makkelie

22 September 2016	FC Twente (1)	1–3	FC Utrecht (1)	Enschede
18:30	Ünal 54'	Report	Zivkovic 17', 90+3'; Haller 88'	Stadium: Grolsch Veste; Referee: Serdar Gözübüyük

22 September 2016	ASV De Dijk (4)	2–7	Vitesse (1)	Amsterdam
20:00	Zwarthoed 41'; Kaars 67'	Report	Baker 9'; Leerdam 34'; Van Wolfswinkel 59' (pen.); Tighadouini 60', 64'; Rashica 84'; Koryan 86'	Stadium: Sportpark Schellingwoude; Attendance: 1,200; Referee: Kevin Blom

22 September 2016	HSC '21 (4)	1–5	TEC (3)	Haaksbergen
20:00	Cenk Uğuz 79'	Report	Peltzer 9'; Vink 12', 17'; Bartels 42'; Huijgens 73'	Stadium: Groot Scholtenhagen; Attendance: 500; Referee: Jeroen Manschot

22 September 2016	Feyenoord (1)	4–1	FC Oss (2)	Rotterdam
20:45	Berghuis 12'; Kramer 68'; Başaçıkoğlu 76'; Jørgensen 90+2'	Report	Boere 3'	Stadium: Stadion Feijenoord; Referee: Pol van Boekel

== Second round ==
The draw of the first round was done on 22 September 2016. 32 teams participated and matches were played on 25, 26 and 27 October 2016.

The lowest ranked team left was Jodan Boys from the fifth tier of Dutch football.

25 October 2016	VVSB (3)	3–0	VV Katwijk (3)	Noordwijkerhout
18:30	Parami 30'; De Rijk 35'; Serbony 90+3'	Report		Stadium: Sportpark De Boekhorst; Referee: Allard Lindhout

25 October 2016	TEC (3)	0–4	SC Cambuur (2)	Tiel
20:00		Report	Monteiro 5' 90'; Van Deelen 29' 43'	Stadium: Sportpark De Lok; Attendance: 1,100; Referee: Sander van der Eijk

25 October 2016	ADO Den Haag (1)	2–1	Telstar (2)	The Hague
20:00	Havenaar 73'; Van der Heijden 81'	Report	Mahmudov 39'	Stadium: Kyocera Stadion; Attendance: 5,106; Referee: Richard Liesveld

25 October 2016	Go Ahead Eagles (1)	1–2	Jodan Boys (5)	Deventer
20:00	Hendriks 28'	Report	Marengo 47'; Heerkens 84'	Stadium: Adelaarshorst; Attendance: 5,163; Referee: Martin Perez

25 October 2016	FC Volendam (2)	2–1 (a.e.t.)	Almere City FC (2)	Volendam
20:00	Kwakman 106'; Steltenpool 115'	Report	Ramsteijn 105'	Stadium: Kras Stadion; Attendance: 1,660; Referee: Edwin van der Graaf

25 October 2016	SV Spakenburg (3)	2–3 (a.e.t.)	ASWH (4)	Spakenburg
20:00	Pilon 73'; Van den Meiracker 90+3'	Report	Olijfveld 35'; De Lange 55'; Verhoeve 106'	Stadium: Sportpark De Westmaat; Attendance: 1,500; Referee: Erwin Blank

25 October 2016	Sparta Rotterdam (1)	3–1	PSV (1)	Rotterdam
20:45	Vriends 15'; El Azzouzi 53'; Brogno 70'	Report	Ramselaar 51'	Stadium: Het Kasteel; Attendance: 10,525; Referee: Danny Makkelie

26 October 2016	Kozakken Boys (3)	1–6	AFC Ajax (1)	Werkendam
18:30	Ignacio 85'	Report	Cassierra 25' 33'; El Ghazi 29'; Černý 41'; Clement 51' 89'	Stadium: Sportpark De Zwaaier; Referee: Jeroen Manschot

26 October 2016	Heracles Almelo (1)	5–0	VV UNA (3)	Almelo
20:00	Armenteros 3' 51'; Kuwas 53'; Pelupessy 61'; Darri 83'	Report		Stadium: Polman Stadion; Attendance: 7,922; Referee: Rob Dieperink

26 October 2016	AZ (1)	1–0	FC Emmen (2)	Alkmaar
20:00	Mühren 63'	Report		Stadium: AFAS Stadion; Referee: Christiaan Bax

26 October 2016	IJsselmeervogels (4)	3–1	Koninklijke HFC (3)	Spakenburg
20:00	Grot 21' 89' (pen.); Akla 24'	Report	Noordmans 34'	Stadium: Sportpark De Westmaat; Attendance: 1,250; Referee: Stijn Berben

26 October 2016	Vitesse (1)	4–1	RKC Waalwijk (2)	Arnhem
20:00	Zhang 19'; Baker 59' (pen.); Nakamba 69'; Nathan 90+3'	Report	Langedijk 53'	Stadium: GelreDome; Referee: Dennis Higler

26 October 2016	FC Utrecht (1)	1–0	FC Groningen (1)	Utrecht
20:00	Barazite 90+2'	Report		Stadium: Stadion Galgenwaard; Attendance: 16,377; Referee: Serdar Gözübüyük

26 October 2016	Feyenoord (1)	4–0	Excelsior (1)	Rotterdam
20:45	Elia 48'; Botteghin 50'; Toornstra 75'; Vejinovic 84'	Report		Stadium: De Kuip; Referee: Kevin Blom

27 October 2016	PEC Zwolle (1)	2–1	VVV-Venlo (2)	Zwolle
18:30	Ehizibue 29'; Mokhtar 52'	Report	Sleegers 83'	Stadium: MAC³PARK Stadion; Referee: Jochem Kamphuis

27 October 2016	FC Eindhoven (2)	1–2	SC Heerenveen (1)	Eindhoven
20:45	Caenepeel 34'	Report	Namli 20'; Ghoochannejhad 30'	Stadium: Jan Louwers Stadion; Referee: Martin van den Kerkhof

== Third round ==
The third round draw was held on 27 October 2016. 16 teams participated and the matches were played on 13, 14, and 15 December 2016.

The lowest ranked team left was Jodan Boys from the fifth tier of Dutch football.

13 December 2016	FC Volendam (2)	4–1	VVSB (3)	Volendam
18:30	Schouten 5'; Kwakman 15'; Velzen 31'; Kippersluis 62'		Serbony 13'	Stadium: Kras Stadion

13 December 2016	IJsselmeervogels (4)	0–1	SC Heerenveen (1)	Spakenburg
20:45			Ghoochannejhad 88'	Stadium: Sportpark De Westmaat

14 December 2016	PEC Zwolle (1)	1–2	FC Utrecht (1)	Zwolle
18:30	Madsen 8'		Conboy 81'; Zivkovic 90' (pen.)	Stadium: MAC³PARK Stadion

14 December 2016	Vitesse (1)	4–0	Jodan Boys (5)	Arnhem
20:00	Miazga 14'; Tighadouini 17'; Baker 52' (pen.); Rashica 56'			Stadium: GelreDome

14 December 2016	AZ (1)	2–0	ASWH (4)	Alkmaar
20:00	Mühren 44'; Friday 86'			Stadium: AFAS Stadion

14 December 2016	Feyenoord (1)	5–1	ADO Den Haag (1)	Rotterdam
20:45	Jørgensen 34'; Kuyt 50' (pen.), 63', 79' (pen.); El Ahmadi 68'		Kastaneer 87'	Stadium: De Kuip

15 December 2016	SC Cambuur (2)	2–1	AFC Ajax (1)	Leeuwarden
18:30	Barto 20', 39'		Clement 67'	Stadium: Cambuur Stadion

15 December 2016	Heracles Almelo (1)	0–3	Sparta Rotterdam (1)	Almelo
20:45			Azzouzi 48', 60', 87'	Stadium: Polman Stadion

== Quarter-finals ==
The quarter-final draw was held on 15 December 2016. 8 teams participated and the matches were played on 24, 25, and 26 January 2017.

The lowest ranked team left were FC Volendam and SC Cambuur from the second tier of Dutch football.

24 January 2017	FC Volendam (2)	1–1 (a.e.t.) (5–6 p)	Sparta Rotterdam (1)	Volendam
20:45	Steltenpool 110'		Verhaar 108'	Stadium: Kras Stadion; Attendance: 3,469; Referee: Jochem Kamphuis
	Penalties
	Evers (penalty scored); Schilder (penalty scored); Vlak (penalty scored); Steltenpool (penalty missed) van Kippersluis (penalty missed); Visser (penalty scored); Verhulst (penalty scored); Meulens (penalty missed)		(penalty scored) Verhaar; (penalty scored) Brogno; (penalty missed) Breuer; (penalty scored) Spierings; (penalty missed) Dijkstra; (penalty scored) Mendes; (penalty scored) Pogba; (penalty scored) Floranus

25 January 2017	FC Utrecht (1)	2–2 (a.e.t.) (6–7 p)	SC Cambuur (2)	Utrecht
18:30	Leeuwin 29'; Troupée 89'		E. Bakker 47' (pen.); Barto 67'	Stadium: Stadion Galgenwaard; Attendance: 13,997; Referee: Pol van Boekel
	Penalties
	Barazite (penalty scored); Labyad (penalty scored); Leeuwin (penalty missed); Janssen (penalty missed); Haller (penalty scored); Hardeveld (penalty scored); Amrabat (penalty scored); Troupée (penalty scored); Peterson (penalty missed)		(penalty scored) E. Bakker; (penalty scored) Schilder; (penalty missed) Houtkoop; (penalty scored) Hoefdraad; (penalty missed) Noor; (penalty scored) Peersman; (penalty scored) Barto; (penalty scored) Lilipaly; (penalty scored) Monteiro

25 January 2017	AZ (1)	1–0	SC Heerenveen (1)	Alkmaar
20:45	Luckassen 71'			Stadium: AFAS Stadion; Attendance: 8,276; Referee: Björn Kuipers

26 January 2017	Vitesse (1)	2–0	Feyenoord (1)	Arnhem
20:45	Kashia 55'; Tighadouini 61'			Stadium: Gelredome; Attendance: 15,673; Referee: Danny Makkelie

== Semi-finals ==
The 4 winners from the previous round progress to this stage. Cupholders Feyenoord were eliminated in the previous round and therefore no longer active in the competition.

The draw was held on 26 January 2017. Matches were played on 1 and 2 March 2017. The lowest ranked team left was SC Cambuur from the second tier of Dutch football.

1 March 2017	Sparta Rotterdam (1)	1–2	Vitesse (1)	Rotterdam
20:45	Kashia 75' (o.g.)		Baker 13', 73'	Stadium: Het Kasteel

2 March 2017	AZ (1)	0–0 (3–2 p)	SC Cambuur (2)	Alkmaar
20:45				Stadium: AFAS Stadion
	Penalties
	Wuytens (penalty scored); Jahanbakhsh (penalty missed); Johansson (penalty missed); Luckassen (penalty scored); Weghorst (penalty scored)		(penalty scored) E. Bakker; (penalty missed) Schilder; (penalty scored) van de Streek; (penalty missed) Mannes; (penalty missed) Barto

== Final ==
The two winners from the previous round progressed to this stage. The winner of the semi-final match between AZ and SC Cambuur was marked as the 'home' team in the final, as that was the first match to be drawn at the draw for the semi-finals. The final took place on 30 April 2017 at De Kuip in Rotterdam.

30 April 2017
18:00

AZ	0–2	Vitesse
	Report	Van Wolfswinkel 81', 88'

De Kuip, Rotterdam
Attendance: 46,105
Referee: Danny Makkelie
