= Bert Steltenpool =

Dutch footballer (born 1994)

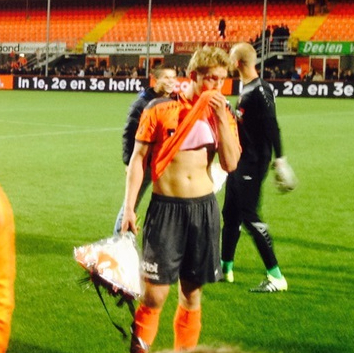
- Steltenpool with Volendam in 2015

Personal information
- Date of birth: 5 May 1994 (age 32)
- Place of birth: Wervershoof, Netherlands
- Height: 1.79 m (5 ft 10 in)
- Position: Forward

Team information
- Current team: VVW

Youth career
- VVW

Senior career*
Years	Team	Apps	(Gls)
–2014	VVW		
2014–2017	Volendam	77	(18)
2016–2017	Jong Volendam	14	(6)
2017–2018	Spakenburg	25	(10)
2018–2020	Quick Boys	22	(2)
2020	→ VVSB (loan)	7	(6)
2020–2022	VVSB	20	(4)
2022–	VVW		
- * Club domestic league appearances and goals

Bert Steltenpool (born 5 May 1994) is a Dutch footballer who plays as a forward for amateur club VVW in his hometown of Wervershoof.

A product of VVW, Steltenpool spent three seasons in the Eerste Divisie with FC Volendam. In September 2015, he scored hat-tricks in consecutive home matches, the second of which secured the club a period title, and he finished the 2015–16 season as its top scorer. He went on to play for Spakenburg, with whom he won the Derde Divisie in 2018, and for Quick Boys and VVSB before returning to VVW in 2022. He is the son of former Volendam defender Eric Steltenpool.

== Early life ==
Steltenpool was born in Wervershoof and started playing in the youth ranks of local club VVW, working his way up from its under-9 team to the first team. He played for VVW in the Derde Klasse before moving into professional football.

== Club career ==
=== Volendam ===
Steltenpool joined Volendam in the summer of 2014, a step the club later described as a big transition from amateur football. He made his professional debut on 28 September 2014, coming on in the 89th minute of a 3–0 home win over MVV.

Steltenpool established himself in the 2015–16 season, starting 24 matches. On 11 September 2015, he scored a hat-trick at home to Jong PSV, and two weeks later he needed only half an hour to score three more against Almere City, the first two of them headers. The 3–1 win secured Volendam the first period title of the season. Supporters' group Het Andere Oranje later sent a tongue-in-cheek letter to his home asking him to pay for the match ball he had kept, ElfVoetbal reported. He ended the season as Volendam's top scorer with 12 league goals, a third of them against Almere City. As period champions, Volendam qualified for the promotion play-offs but lost 4–2 on aggregate to MVV in the first round.

Steltenpool made his mark in the 2016–17 KNVB Cup. On 25 October 2016, he came on in extra time against Almere City, set up Kees Kwakman's equaliser within seconds and scored the 114th-minute winner from a Jack Tuijp pass, a performance NH described as worth its weight in gold. In the quarter-final on 24 January 2017, he equalised from close range two minutes after Thomas Verhaar had given Sparta Rotterdam the lead in extra time, but Sparta won 6–5 on penalties. At the end of March 2017, Volendam decided not to extend his expiring contract. He left after three seasons, in which he made 77 appearances and scored 18 goals. In his final year, he also played occasionally for the reserve side Jong FC Volendam.

=== Spakenburg ===
In May 2017, Steltenpool signed for SV Spakenburg, which had just been relegated to the Derde Divisie for the first time in its history after losing a play-off final to Rijnsburgse Boys. There he joined former Volendam players Theo Timmermans, Kees Tol and Nick Tol. He was a regular starter in the first half of the season and scored twice in a 3–0 win away to Katwijk in September. After the winter break, he was mostly on the bench. In early April 2018, he announced that he would leave at the end of the season, saying that he lacked the full trust of the technical staff. He finished the season with ten goals as Spakenburg won the Derde Divisie title.

=== Quick Boys ===
Quick Boys called Steltenpool the morning after he announced his departure from Spakenburg, and he chose the Katwijk club over interest from Tweede Divisie sides, calling it one of the biggest amateur clubs in the Netherlands. He signed on 17 May 2018 and said that he wanted to fight for promotion with his new club. He was Quick Boys' top scorer in pre-season with seven goals and started the first five league matches under head coach Erik Assink, but lost his place after a 1–1 draw with ODIN '59 and played only 69 minutes in the next eleven league matches. In December 2018, he signed a new two-year contract, explaining that he needed security and was not someone who changed clubs often.

Steltenpool started the following season in the side but soon lost his place again and came on mostly as a substitute. In December 2019, Quick Boys loaned him to VVSB of Noordwijkerhout for the rest of the season, with an option for a permanent move.

=== VVSB ===
Steltenpool stayed at VVSB beyond his loan. In February 2021, the club announced that he would leave at the end of the season to give priority to his work, but two months later he reversed his decision after long deliberation, and head coach Richard Plug made room for him in the squad. He missed much of the second half of the following season through injury. After returning as a substitute, he announced in 2022 that he would join VVW in the Derde Klasse to play alongside his friends, a decision VVSB said he had made with impending fatherhood in mind.

=== Return to VVW ===
By the autumn of 2026, Steltenpool had dropped to VVW's third team. A week after being recalled to the first team, he played a leading role on the left wing in a 4–2 win over De Zouaven in the Derde Klasse A on 8 November, setting up captain Rob Neuvel's header for the third goal.

== Personal life ==
Steltenpool is the son of former Volendam defender Eric Steltenpool, who played 83 Eredivisie matches for the club. After leaving professional football, he went to work in his father's family business, which processes nuts and seeds.
