= 2017 KNVB Cup final =

- Event: 2016–17 KNVB Cup
AZ	Vitesse
0	2
- Date: 30 April 2017
- Venue: De Kuip, Rotterdam
- Referee: Danny Makkelie
- Attendance: 46,105

The 2017 KNVB Cup final was a football match between Vitesse and AZ on 30 April 2017 at De Kuip, Rotterdam. It was the final match of the 2016–17 KNVB Cup competition and the 99th Dutch Cup Final. Vitesse beat AZ 2–0 to secure their first KNVB Cup trophy and win even their first silverware in their 125-year history.

Ricky van Wolfswinkel was Vitesse's hero of the game as he scored both goals in the final 10 minutes of the match.

== Route to the final ==
AZ		Round	Vitesse	
Opponent	Result		Opponent	Result
FC Lienden	4–1 (A)	Second round	De Dijk	7–2 (A)
Emmen	1–0 (H)	Third round	RKC	4–1 (H)
ASWH	2–0 (H)	Round of 16	De Jodan Boys	4–0 (H)
Heerenveen	1–0 (H)	Quarter-finals	Feyenoord	2–0 (H)
SC Cambuur	0–0 (3–2 on pens) (H)	Semi-finals	Sparta	2–1 (A)

== Match ==
=== Details ===
30 April 2017
18:00 CEST

AZ	0–2	Vitesse
	Report	Van Wolfswinkel 81', 88'

De Kuip, Rotterdam
Attendance: 46,105
Referee: Danny Makkelie

AZ	Vitesse

GK	24	(Netherlands) Tim Krul
RB	17	(Norway) Jonas Svensson
CB	3	(Netherlands) Rens van Eijden		(substituted off) 83'
CB	4	(Netherlands) Ron Vlaar (c)
LB	5	(Netherlands) Ridgeciano Haps
CM	30	(Belgium) Stijn Wuytens
CM	23	(Netherlands) Derrick Luckassen	(yellow card) 77'
AM	8	(Netherlands) Joris van Overeem		(substituted off) 67'
RW	7	(Iran) Alireza Jahanbakhsh
LW	19	(Netherlands) Dabney dos Santos		(substituted off) 79'
ST	9	(Netherlands) Wout Weghorst
Substitutes:
GK	1	(Uruguay) Sergio Rochet
DF	12	(Netherlands) Pantelis Hatzidiakos
DF	2	(Sweden) Mattias Johansson
DF	22	(Netherlands) Thomas Ouwejan
MF	18	(Netherlands) Iliass Bel Hassani		(substituted on) 79'
MF	6	(Netherlands) Ben Rienstra
MF	20	(Netherlands) Mats Seuntjens		(substituted on) 67'
FW	28	(Nigeria) Fred Friday		(substituted on) 83'
FW	29	(Trinidad and Tobago) Levi García
FW	11	(Sweden) Muamer Tankovic
Manager:
(Netherlands) John van den Brom

GK	1	(Curaçao) Eloy Room
RB	5	(Netherlands) Kelvin Leerdam		(substituted off) 88'
CB	19	(United States) Matt Miazga
CB	37	(Georgia (country)) Guram Kashia (c)
LB	6	(Netherlands) Arnold Kruiswijk
CM	18	(Zimbabwe) Marvelous Nakamba
CM	34	(England) Lewis Baker
AM	25	(Netherlands) Navarone Foor		(substituted off) 90+1'
RW	7	(Kosovo) Milot Rashica
CF	13	(Netherlands) Ricky van Wolfswinkel	(yellow card) 77'
LW	11	(Brazil) Nathan		(substituted off) 73'
Substitutes:
GK	24	(Netherlands) Jeroen Houwen
GK	23	(Denmark) Michael Tørnes
DF	28	(Netherlands) Alexander Büttner
DF	17	(Netherlands) Kevin Diks		(substituted on) 88'
DF	43	(Netherlands) Lassana Faye
DF	3	(Netherlands) Maikel van der Werff		(substituted on) 90+1'
MF	8	(England) Mukhtar Ali
MF	30	(Russia) Arshak Koryan
FW	10	(Morocco) Adnane Tighadouini		(substituted on) 73'
FW	9	(China) Yuning Zhang
FW	16	(Netherlands) Mitchell van Bergen
Manager:
(Netherlands) Henk Fräser

Match rules

- 90 minutes.
- 30 minutes of extra-time if necessary.
- Penalty shoot-out if scores still level.
- Maximum of three substitutions.
