= 2011–12 FC Volendam season =

FC Volendam
2011–12 season
- Manager: Gert Kruys (until 6 March); Johan Steur (from 6 March)
- Stadium: Kras Stadion
- Eerste Divisie: 12th
- KNVB Cup: Third round
- Top goalscorer: League: Jack Tuyp (20); All: Jack Tuyp (21)
- Biggest win: Volendam 6–1 AGOVV
- Biggest defeat: Go Ahead Eagles 5–0 Volendam

In the 2011–12 season, FC Volendam played in the Dutch second division, the Eerste Divisie. The club played their home matches at the Kras Stadion in Volendam.

== Competitions ==
=== Overall record ===
Competition	First match	Last match	Starting round	Final position	Record							
Competition	First match	Last match	Starting round	Final position	Pld	W	D	L	GF	GA	GD	Win %
Eerste Divisie	5 August 2011	27 April 2012	Matchday 1	12th	34	14	6	14	57	55	+2	41.18
KNVB Cup	21 September 2011	27 October 2011	Second round	Third round	2	1	0	1	3	2	+1	50.00
Total					36	15	6	15	60	57	+3	41.67

Source: Competitions

=== Eerste Divisie ===
==== League table ====
Pos	Team	Pld	W	D	L	GF	GA	GD	Pts
10	Dordrecht	34	13	11	10	56	62	−6	50
11	Fortuna Sittard	34	13	9	12	62	51	+11	48
12	Volendam	34	14	6	14	57	55	+2	48
13	Almere City	34	11	7	16	52	62	−10	40
14	Oss	34	10	5	19	56	76	−20	35

Source: Eerste divisie (official site) (in Dutch)
Rules for classification: 1) points; 2) goal difference; 3) number of goals scored.

==== Results summary ====
Overall								Home						Away					
Pld	W	D	L	GF	GA	GD	Pts	W	D	L	GF	GA	GD	W	D	L	GF	GA	GD
34	14	6	14	57	55	+2	48	10	3	4	39	25	+14	4	3	10	18	30	−12

Source: Worldfootball

==== Results by round ====
Round	1	2	3	4	5	6	7	8	9	10	11	12	13	14	15	16	17	18	19	20	21	22	23	24	25	26	27	28	29	30	31	32	33	34
Ground	A	H	A	H	H	A	A	H	A	H	A	H	A	H	A	H	H	A	H	A	H	A	H	A	A	H	A	H	H	A	A	H	A	H
Result	D	W	D	D	L	L	W	W	W	W	L	W	L	W	L	W	L	L	L	W	D	L	L	L	L	D	L	W	W	L	W	W	D	W
Position	10	3	7	8	13	15	12	9	5	4	4	4	6	5	6	5	7	8	8	7	7	9	10	10	13	12	14	13	11	12	12	12	12	12

Source: Worldfootball
A = Away; H = Home; W = Win; D = Draw; L = Loss

==== Matches ====
5 August 2011 1	Dordrecht	0–0	Volendam	Dordrecht
				Stadium: Stadion Krommedijk; Attendance: 2,148; Referee: Björn Kuipers

12 August 2011 2	Volendam	2–0	MVV Maastricht	Volendam
	Tuijp 15', 60'			Stadium: Kras Stadion; Attendance: 2,636; Referee: Rogier Honig

19 August 2011 3	Sparta Rotterdam	0–0	Volendam	Rotterdam
				Stadium: Sparta Stadion Het Kasteel; Attendance: 7,206; Referee: Martin van den Kerkhof

28 August 2011 4	Volendam	2–2	Go Ahead Eagles	Volendam
	Tuijp 40', 72' (pen.)		Karami 38'; Antonia 48'	Stadium: Kras Stadion; Attendance: 3,103; Referee: Ed Janssen

11 September 2011 5	Volendam	1–4	Cambuur	Volendam
				Stadium: Kras Stadion

16 September 2011 6	Zwolle	3–1	Volendam	Zwolle
				Stadium: MAC³PARK Stadion

24 September 2011 7	Emmen	0–4	Volendam	Emmen
				Stadium: De Oude Meerdijk

30 September 2011 8	Volendam	3–2	Fortuna Sittard	Volendam
				Stadium: Kras Stadion

14 October 2011 9	Den Bosch	1–2	Volendam	's-Hertogenbosch
				Stadium: De Vliert

24 October 2011 10	Volendam	6–1	AGOVV	Volendam
				Stadium: Kras Stadion

30 October 2011 11	Willem II	1–0	Volendam	Tilburg
				Stadium: Koning Willem II Stadion

6 November 2011 12	Volendam	4–1	Telstar	Volendam
				Stadium: Kras Stadion

18 November 2011 13	Eindhoven	2–0	Volendam	Eindhoven
				Stadium: Jan Louwers Stadion

25 November 2011 14	Volendam	3–2	Veendam	Volendam
				Stadium: Kras Stadion

2 December 2011 15	Almere City	2–1	Volendam	Almere
				Stadium: Yanmar Stadion

9 December 2011 16	Volendam	3–1	Helmond Sport	Volendam
				Stadium: Kras Stadion

16 December 2011 17	Volendam	1–2	FC Oss	Volendam
				Stadium: Kras Stadion

13 January 2012 18	Go Ahead Eagles	5–0	Volendam	Deventer
				Stadium: De Adelaarshorst

22 January 2012 19	Volendam	0–2	Den Bosch	Volendam
				Stadium: Kras Stadion

13 February 2012 20	AGOVV	1–2	Volendam

17 February 2012 23	Volendam	1–2	Willem II	Volendam
				Stadium: Kras Stadion

24 February 2012 24	Fortuna Sittard	3–2	Volendam	Sittard
				Stadium: Fortuna Sittard Stadion

27 February 2012 22	Veendam	1–0	Volendam	Veendam

2 March 2012 25	Cambuur	4–1	Volendam	Leeuwarden
				Stadium: Cambuur Stadion

5 March 2012 21	Volendam	2–2	Zwolle	Volendam
				Stadium: Kras Stadion

9 March 2012 26	Volendam	1–1	Dordrecht	Volendam
				Stadium: Kras Stadion

16 March 2012 27	MVV Maastricht	3–0	Volendam	Maastricht
				Stadium: De Geusselt

23 March 2012 28	Volendam	1–0	Sparta Rotterdam	Volendam
				Stadium: Kras Stadion

30 March 2012 29	Volendam	3–1	Almere City	Volendam
				Stadium: Kras Stadion

6 April 2012 30	Helmond Sport	1–0	Volendam	Helmond
				Stadium: Lavans Stadion

9 April 2012 31	FC Oss	1–3	Volendam	Oss
				Stadium: Frans Heesen Stadion

13 April 2012 32	Volendam	3–1	Emmen	Volendam
				Stadium: Kras Stadion

20 April 2012 33	Telstar	2–2	Volendam	Velsen-Zuid
				Stadium: Sportpark Schoonenberg

27 April 2012 34	Volendam	3–1	Eindhoven	Volendam
				Stadium: Kras Stadion

=== KNVB Cup ===
21 September 2011 Second round	UNA	1–3	Volendam	Veldhoven
20:00 CEST (UTC+2)	Kneepkens 61'	Report	Tuyp 25' (pen.); Roj 29'; Ahahaoui 53'	Stadium: Sportpark Zeelst; Referee: Jeroen Abbink

27 October 2011 Third round	NEC	1–0	Volendam	Nijmegen
20:00 CEST (UTC+2)	Latupeirissa 39'	Report		Stadium: Goffertstadion; Referee: Pol van Boekel
