= Gerry Koning =

Dutch footballer (born 1980)

Personal information
- Date of birth: 3 January 1980 (age 46)
- Place of birth: Volendam, Netherlands
- Height: 1.73 m (5 ft 8 in)
- Position: Right-back

Youth career
- RKAV Volendam
- FC Volendam

Senior career*
Years	Team	Apps	(Gls)
1998–2004	Volendam	82	(1)
2004–2005	Excelsior	21	(0)
2005–2006	Volendam	36	(0)
2006–2008	RBC Roosendaal	68	(0)
2008–2009	Volendam	28	(0)
2009–2011	Heerenveen	25	(0)
2011–2014	Volendam	96	(2)
Total		356	(3)
- * Club domestic league appearances and goals

Gerry Koning (born 3 January 1980) is a Dutch former professional footballer who played as a right-back. A product of the FC Volendam youth system, he played 356 league matches between 1998 and 2014, most of them in four spells with his hometown club Volendam, and also played for Excelsior, RBC Roosendaal and Heerenveen.

Koning made his debut for Volendam in 1998 and was part of the side that won promotion to the Eredivisie through the play-offs in 2003, which he later called the highlight of his career. After spells at Excelsior and RBC, he returned to Volendam in 2008, and on the final day of the 2008–09 season his late own goal against De Graafschap sealed the club's relegation. He then spent two seasons at Heerenveen, where he played in the UEFA Europa League, before a final spell at Volendam from 2011 to 2014. Koning studied actuarial science and later worked as an actuary in the pensions sector.

== Early life ==
Koning was born in Volendam on 3 January 1980. He comes from a Volendam football family known locally by the nickname "Not". His father, Jaap Koning, briefly played for the FC Volendam first team in the mid-1960s, and his grandfather, Klaas Koning, was a regular in the side for 25 seasons between 1932 and 1957, during the club's amateur era.

Koning began playing football at the age of seven with the amateurs of RKAV Volendam and was moved into the youth academy of Volendam's professional section after one season. He played mainly in midfield as a youth, apart from a spell as a centre-back in the under-13s, and first played at full-back in the under-17s, when the under-19 team were short of defenders and he was drafted in to fill the gap. Able to use both feet, although he favoured his right, he was used on both flanks.

== Club career ==
=== Volendam ===
Koning made his first-team debut on 2 November 1998 in a 3–3 home draw with FC Eindhoven, coming on after 22 minutes for Ab Persijn. After a difficult start he became a regular in the side, and in the 2002–03 season Volendam finished sixth in the Eerste Divisie and then won their promotion play-off group ahead of Emmen, Excelsior and Heracles Almelo to return to the Eredivisie. Koning later named the promotion as the highlight of his career. He recalled that when the players set off on the traditional parade float and first drove along the dyke, there was hardly anyone to be seen, and that he and his team-mates feared the celebration would be very different from the stories they had been told. When the float reached the harbour, he said, it became "one big orange mass of people".

Koning remained a regular in the 2003–04 season, in which Volendam finished 17th and were relegated after finishing bottom of their play-off group.

=== Excelsior ===
In July 2004, after six years in Volendam's first team, Koning signed a two-year contract with Eerste Divisie club Excelsior as the replacement for Danny Buijs, who had left for Groningen. He said that he had chosen Excelsior deliberately because the club played at the top of the division. He made 21 league appearances in his only season in Rotterdam before returning to Volendam in 2005.

=== Return to Volendam ===
Koning made 36 league appearances in the 2005–06 season, playing alongside Kees Kwakman as Volendam reached the final round of the promotion play-offs, where they lost 2–1 on aggregate to NAC Breda.

=== RBC Roosendaal ===
In 2006, Koning and Kwakman both left Volendam for fellow Eerste Divisie club RBC Roosendaal, which was coached by Robert Maaskant. Koning signed a two-year contract. RBC finished third in the 2006–07 season and knocked his former club out of the second round of the play-offs, winning 5–3 in Volendam on 9 May 2007 and 1–0 at home three days later, before losing 2–1 on aggregate to Excelsior in the final round. Koning made 68 league appearances in his two seasons at RBC.

=== Third spell at Volendam ===
Koning returned to Volendam in 2008, after the club had won promotion back to the Eredivisie without him. In the 2008–09 KNVB Cup, Volendam beat Roda JC 3–2 after extra time in the quarter-finals and met Heerenveen in the semi-finals, where Koning started in a 2–0 home defeat on 22 April 2009. Heerenveen went on to win the trophy for the first time.

Volendam went into the final day of the league season still fighting to avoid relegation. Away to De Graafschap on 10 May 2009, they came from behind to lead 2–1 through Gerson Sheotahul and Jack Tuijp, but in the 78th minute Koning turned the ball into his own net for the 2–2 equaliser. The draw left Volendam a point behind De Graafschap, and the club were relegated after one season in the top flight. Koning later recalled that he had tried to block a shot from Ben Sahar with his left foot but struck the ball with his instep past goalkeeper Jeroen Verhoeven, and that he missed a chance to score the winner himself five minutes from time.

In a column for NU.nl two days later, Thijs Zonneveld compared the own goal with that of Andrés Escobar at the 1994 FIFA World Cup and wrote that Koning had muttered in the catacombs of De Vijverberg that it would be "a long journey home". Koning later described the own goal as the low point of his career. He said that it was "particularly bitter" and would always stay with him, and that although a team is relegated over a whole season rather than a single match, it remained painful that it had happened to him.

=== Heerenveen ===
In the summer of 2009, Koning joined Heerenveen on a free transfer, signing a two-year contract with an option for a third year. He made his debut for the club on 23 August 2009 in a 2–0 home defeat to AZ, with head coach Trond Sollied fielding him in midfield. On 5 November 2009, he started in a 3–2 home defeat to Hertha BSC in the group stage of the Europa League.

Koning made nine league appearances in his first season, and when Volendam showed interest in bringing him back, he chose to stay and fight for his place. He played more often in the 2010–11 season, helped partly by injuries to Daryl Janmaat, but did not make a breakthrough, and Heerenveen allowed him to leave on a free transfer in 2011 by not taking up the option in his contract.

=== Fourth spell at Volendam ===
On 10 May 2011, Koning agreed a two-year contract to return to Volendam for a fourth time. Under Hans de Koning, who took over in 2012, Volendam challenged for promotion in the 2012–13 season, and Koning scored in a 6–1 home win over FC Dordrecht on 25 February 2013. Volendam lost the title on the final day when they were beaten 3–1 away to Go Ahead Eagles, which allowed Cambuur to finish first. De Koning said that everyone at the club had been crushed for more than a week after that blow. The two sides met again in the final round of the play-offs, and Volendam lost the first leg 3–0 in Deventer on 23 May 2013. They won the return leg 1–0, but Go Ahead won the tie and were promoted.

Koning scored a stoppage-time equaliser in a 2–2 home draw with Excelsior on 13 September 2013, but Volendam had a disappointing 2013–14 season and missed out on the play-offs. He left the club in July 2014 and retired from professional football, having made 285 appearances for Volendam, 242 of them in the league.

== Style of play ==
Koning was mainly a right-back but also played at left-back and in midfield. When Excelsior signed him in 2004, Voetbal International described him as both a midfielder and a defender, and Sollied used him in midfield on his Heerenveen debut. He was comfortable with both feet and was known for needing few fouls to stop opposing attackers.

== Personal life ==
Koning studied actuarial science, saying that mathematics had always come easily to him, and after his playing career he worked as an actuary at an actuarial consultancy, dealing mainly with collective pensions. He completed his degree at the University of Amsterdam during his football career and began working part-time at the consultancy Triple A in April 2007, before joining the firm full-time after he retired in 2014.
