= Kees Kwakman =

Dutch footballer and pundit (born 1983)

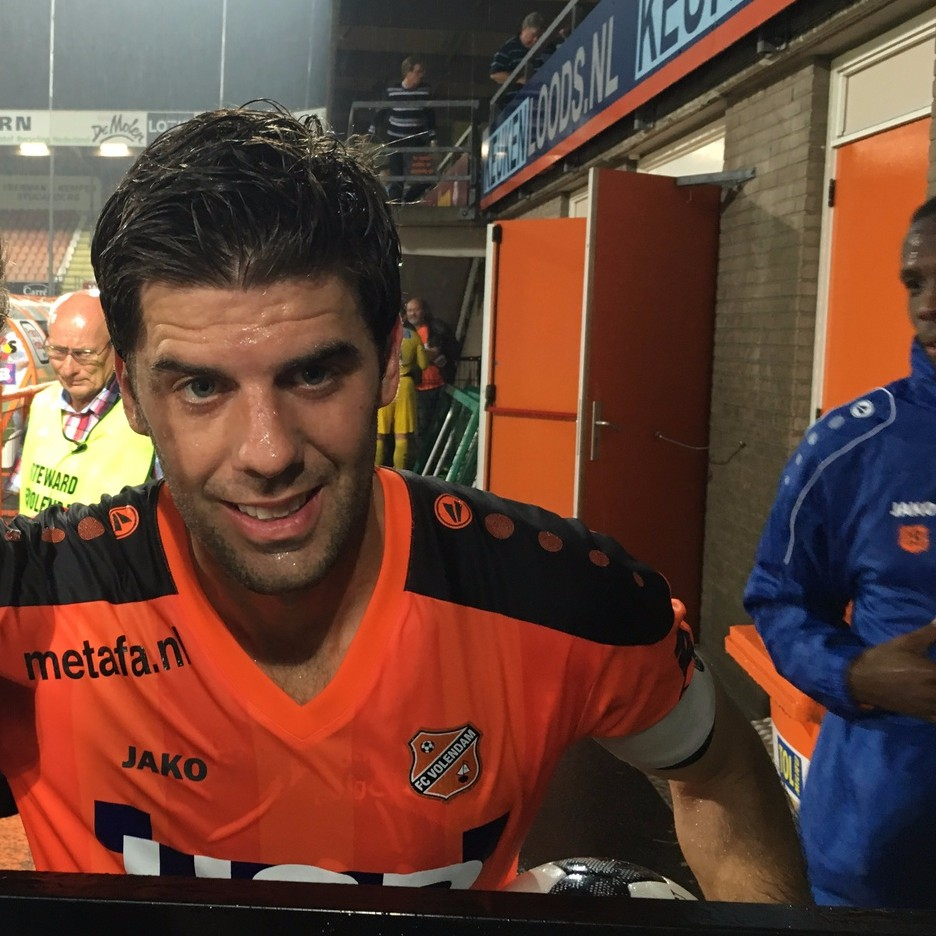
- Kwakman with Volendam in 2015

Personal information
- Full name: Cornelis Job Wilhelmus Kwakman
- Date of birth: 10 June 1983 (age 43)
- Place of birth: Purmerend, Netherlands
- Positions: Centre-back; defensive midfielder

Youth career
- 1989–1995: RKAV Volendam
- 1995–2003: Volendam

Senior career*
Years	Team	Apps	(Gls)
2003–2006	Volendam	69	(10)
2006–2008	RBC Roosendaal	70	(12)
2008–2010	NAC Breda	73	(10)
2010–2011	FC Augsburg	20	(0)
2011–2013	Groningen	49	(1)
2013–2014	NAC Breda	28	(3)
2014–2015	Bidvest Wits	18	(2)
2015–2018	Volendam	61	(12)
Total		388	(50)
- * Club domestic league appearances and goals

Cornelis Job Wilhelmus "Kees" Kwakman (born 10 June 1983) is a Dutch football pundit and former professional footballer who played as a centre-back or defensive midfielder. He played 388 league matches in the Netherlands, Germany and South Africa between 2004 and 2018 and captained Groningen, NAC Breda and Volendam.

Born in Purmerend and raised in Volendam, Kwakman is the son of former FC Volendam player Wim Kwakman and survived the Volendam New Year's fire of 2001 as a teenager. He came through the Volendam youth system, won the KNVB Cup for A-juniors and made his first-team debut in the 2004 relegation play-offs against Heracles Almelo. After two seasons in the Eerste Divisie he moved to RBC Roosendaal, and in 2008 he joined NAC, where he helped the club reach Europe through the play-offs and scored in both legs against Polonia Warsaw in the qualifying rounds of the 2009–10 UEFA Europa League.

Kwakman won promotion to the Bundesliga with FC Augsburg in 2011 and then spent two seasons at Groningen, the second as captain, partnering a young Virgil van Dijk in central defence. He returned to NAC in 2013, and spent the 2014–15 season with Bidvest Wits in South Africa. He finished his career at Volendam, retiring in February 2018, and became a studio analyst for Fox Sports, which was later renamed ESPN. In 2026 he reached the final of the reality series Football Island.

== Early life ==
Kwakman was born in Purmerend because Volendam had no hospital, and he grew up in Volendam. His father, Wim Kwakman, played 259 matches and scored 33 goals for FC Volendam between 1969 and 1984. According to Kwakman, his father had the chance to join Ajax at the age of 21, but Kwakman's grandmother would not allow the move. By 2009, Wim was coaching the Ajax under-15 youth team at De Toekomst. As a boy, Kwakman was among the Volendam supporters at the 1995 KNVB Cup final, which the club lost to Feyenoord, and he later recalled that he missed Volendam's goal because he had gone to fetch a sandwich.

Kwakman started playing football at the amateur club RKAV Volendam at the age of six. His father, who was then coaching the FC Volendam under-13 team, let him join in with his team's training sessions.

On New Year's Eve 2000, aged 17, Kwakman was in café 't Hemeltje when the Volendam New Year's fire broke out. He spent nine days in hospital with second-degree burns to his hands and neck.

== Club career ==
=== Youth career ===
Kwakman later moved to the FC Volendam youth academy, where his father coached him in the under-17s. He said that the arrangement caused tension at home, with his mother taking his side, but that it made him stronger. In the under-19s he played alongside Jack Tuijp and Cerezo Fung a Wing. He described his first season in the U19 team under Nico Mol as a disaster, as the team were relegated, the New Year's fire struck the village and the club came close to sending him back to RKAV.

The following season, Kwakman was moved from midfield to centre-back, and Volendam won the KNVB Cup for under-19s. In the semi-final, they came back from 3–0 down at half-time to beat an Ajax side including Maarten Stekelenburg, Nigel de Jong and Nando Rafael 4–3, with Tuijp scoring twice. In the final they beat Heerenveen on penalties, with Kwakman marking Georgios Samaras. He then captained the reserve team to the league title under Johan Steur, although he rarely trained with the first team.

=== Volendam ===
Kwakman was promoted to the first-team squad for the 2003–04 season under Henk Wisman but did not get a chance. After Steur took over as head coach in January 2004, technical director Wim Jonk and assistant coach Marcel Bout brought him back into the squad. Volendam finished 17th and entered the relegation play-offs, where Kwakman made his debut as a substitute in the last of their six group matches, a 2–2 draw at home to Heracles Almelo, playing five minutes. Volendam finished bottom of the group with one point and were relegated to the Eerste Divisie.

Under new head coach Job Dragtsma, Kwakman played regularly at the start of the 2004–05 season, his first league match coming in a 4–0 home win over Cambuur on 15 August 2004. He then lost his place, and after Dragtsma was dismissed during the season, his successor Ernie Brandts followed Jonk's advice and played Kwakman at centre-back, after which he was not dropped again. He scored eight goals in 33 league matches as Volendam finished fifth and qualified for the promotion play-offs. In their play-off group, Volendam finished second behind RBC Roosendaal, who kept their Eredivisie place. Kwakman scored in the final group match, a 3–3 draw with Stormvogels Telstar on 9 June 2005.

Kwakman played 36 league matches and scored twice in the 2005–06 season. Volendam again reached the play-offs and, after beating Helmond Sport over three matches in the second round, met NAC Breda in the final round. They lost the first leg 2–1 at home on 5 May 2006 and drew the second 0–0 in Breda three days later, so NAC kept their place in the Eredivisie. Kwakman later said that Volendam had missed out on promotion by a narrow margin in Breda.

=== RBC Roosendaal ===
When Brandts left Volendam in 2006 to become head coach of NAC, he wanted to take Kwakman with him, but Kwakman had already agreed to join RBC Roosendaal under Robert Maaskant. He moved to RBC together with Volendam right-back Gerry Koning. Kwakman later described himself at the time as a naive defender who went forward too often, and said that Maaskant curbed the habit. At RBC he formed a central defensive partnership with Tyrone Loran, having played alongside Peter Wijker at Volendam. Kwakman recalled that RBC won almost every match before the winter break but faded in the second half of the season, during which Maaskant announced that he would leave.

RBC finished third in the 2006–07 season, and Kwakman scored six goals in 36 league matches. In the play-offs RBC knocked out his former club, winning 5–3 in Volendam on 9 May 2007 and 1–0 at home three days later, before losing 2–1 on aggregate to Excelsior in the final round. Kwakman scored another six goals in 34 league matches in the 2007–08 season. On 2 June 2008, after two seasons, 70 official matches and 12 goals for RBC, he agreed a three-year contract with Eredivisie club NAC Breda.

=== NAC Breda ===
At NAC, Kwakman was reunited with Maaskant, who took charge of the club that summer. He scored his first goal for the club to open the scoring in a 3–0 win away to Roda JC on 21 September 2008. He later named a goal against Roda that season as the best of his career, and recalled that the television commentator had called him "de Purmerender". Kwakman played 35 league matches and scored four goals in the 2008–09 season as NAC finished eighth.

NAC then beat Feyenoord in the semi-finals of the European play-offs, winning 3–2 at home on 16 May 2009 and 4–0 in Rotterdam five days later. Kwakman scored NAC's third goal in the second leg. NAC beat Groningen in the final to claim a place in the qualifying rounds of the new UEFA Europa League.

In the second qualifying round, Kwakman opened the scoring in a 6–0 home win over the Armenian club Gandzasar Kapan on 16 July 2009. Against Polonia Warsaw in the third qualifying round, he scored the only goal of the first leg in Warsaw from a free kick, and in the return leg in Breda on 6 August he dribbled past Marek Sokołowski and scored with a low shot from a tight angle to complete a 3–1 win. NAC met Villarreal in the play-off round and lost 9–2 on aggregate.

In August 2009, NAC added two years to Kwakman's contract. He scored six goals in 34 league matches in the 2009–10 season, including the winner in a 2–1 victory away to Groningen on 16 August 2009 and goals in home wins over Heerenveen, Vitesse and Willem II.

Kwakman made four league appearances at the start of the 2010–11 season. With NAC in sporting and financial difficulty, he decided at the end of August 2010 to leave for the greater security offered by 2. Bundesliga club FC Augsburg. He played his last match for NAC against VVV-Venlo on 28 August, setting up a goal for Matthew Amoah.

=== FC Augsburg ===
Kwakman signed a two-year contract with Augsburg shortly before the transfer deadline, joining as cover for the injured Lukas Sinkiewicz. The fee was undisclosed, and he was the club's third signing from the Eredivisie that summer after Paul Verhaegh and Gibril Sankoh. Head coach Jos Luhukay said that Kwakman would be "another good addition to our defensive build-up". Kwakman later said that Luhukay already knew him, and that he had phoned Verhaegh to ask about the club before he signed.

Shortly after the move, his former NAC team-mate Leonardo responded to an interview in which Kwakman had said that the forward did not work hard enough and did not listen to his team-mates. Leonardo said that Kwakman had not shown what he could do in a year together at NAC and would at best be a ball boy at Ajax or Feyenoord, both clubs Leonardo had played for. Kwakman told Voetbal International that Leonardo's comments contained "a few untruths".

Kwakman arrived without a pre-season and had mainly played in midfield at NAC, but Luhukay used him at centre-back, a change he later said took time to adjust to along with a new language and new surroundings. He played his first full match in defence away to MSV Duisburg, where Sankoh's injury and Uwe Möhrle's suspension forced him into the back line against Stefan Maierhofer. Kwakman said that team spirit was the squad's biggest strength, and that he, Daniel Baier, Michael Thurk and Verhaegh met every Monday at an Irish pub to eat and play cards. He made 20 league appearances and two in the DFB-Pokal, and Augsburg sealed promotion to the Bundesliga with a 2–1 win over FSV Frankfurt on the penultimate matchday, Stephan Hain scoring the winner from a corner in the closing minutes. Kwakman did not score for Augsburg, and later joked that he had scored for every club except Augsburg because of his heavy defensive workload there. According to RTV Noord, he decided to leave in the summer of 2011, with a year left on his contract, because he had played too little.

=== Groningen ===
On 24 June 2011, Kwakman signed a two-year contract with Eredivisie club FC Groningen, who were looking for a successor to Andreas Granqvist. Groningen paid no transfer fee, although a goodwill fee was paid by the club's sponsor AL-KO. He played through pain for much of his first season, which was initially attributed to pubic inflammation but turned out to be an abdominal muscle injury. He made 14 league appearances as Groningen finished 14th in the 2011–12 season. In central defence he partnered Virgil van Dijk, who had quickly displaced the Belgian Jonas Ivens, and Kwakman later said that Van Dijk's composure on the ball had stood out even then.

Maaskant was appointed head coach of Groningen in May 2012, making him Kwakman's manager for the third time, and Kwakman was named captain before the 2012–13 season. He played 35 league matches that season and scored his only goal for Groningen against RKC Waalwijk in November 2012. The club finished seventh and lost 4–2 on aggregate to Twente in the semi-finals of the European play-offs. On 23 May 2013, Kwakman announced that he would not extend his expiring contract, saying that he increasingly felt that he wanted to play abroad. Technical manager Henk Veldmate said that the club respected his wish to wait before deciding on his future but had to move on, and that it had enough young players to take over the role Kwakman had filled. He left after 52 official matches and one goal.

=== Return to NAC Breda ===
Kwakman held talks with NAC in April 2013, and returned to the club as a free agent that summer. He captained the side under head coach Nebojša Gudelj. He scored in a 5–1 win away to Roda JC, and on 10 November 2013 he scored both goals from set pieces in a 2–1 win over PSV. The performance earned him a place in La Gazzetta dello Sport's team of the week alongside Cristiano Ronaldo and Zlatan Ibrahimović. By then he had played every minute of the season, with NAC tenth after 13 rounds.

Kwakman made 28 league appearances and scored three goals in the 2013–14 season, but he lost his place in the team, and in February 2014 he told technical director Graeme Rutjes that he was unhappy. He sat on the bench in plain clothes for the last time at a pre-season friendly against VV Oosterhout on 2 July 2014.

=== Bidvest Wits ===
In July 2014, with a year left on his contract, NAC allowed Kwakman to leave on a free transfer to South African club Bidvest Wits, where former NAC player Glen Salmon was on the technical staff. Kwakman said that he had no problems with Gudelj but that there was no chemistry between them, and that he was looking for an adventure. He signed a one-year contract with an option for a second year. Fellow Dutchman Alje Schut, who had been nominated for the Premiership's player of the season award, helped persuade him to make the move.

A delay in obtaining his work permit kept Kwakman on the sidelines for about five weeks, during which he missed one cup match and two league matches. He made his debut on 20 August 2014 in a 1–0 league win over Maritzburg United and kept a clean sheet in a performance that head coach Gavin Hunt praised. He scored his first goals for the club, both from corners, in a 2–0 away win over Moroka Swallows that extended Wits' unbeaten run to seven matches and lifted them to second in the table. In March 2015, he scored the opening goal in a 3–0 win over University of Pretoria in the last 16 of the Nedbank Cup. He made 18 league appearances and scored two goals in his only season in South Africa.

=== Return to Volendam ===
In May 2015, Kwakman turned down a reduced offer from Wits and agreed a three-year contract, with an option for a fourth year, to return to Volendam alongside Jack Tuijp. He said that the club had offered him the chance to obtain his coaching diploma, and that his son had also wanted to go back to Volendam. He scored on his second debut for the club, in a 4–1 win away to his former side NAC on the opening day of the 2015–16 season, and scored twice in a 6–0 win away to Fortuna Sittard later that month. Together with Tuijp, he acted as a mentor to the club's young players Gerry Vlak and Bert Steltenpool. On 23 October 2015, he injured his knee against Emmen and was out for three months, returning to the starting line-up against Dordrecht on 22 January 2016. He finished the season with four goals in 14 league matches.

Kwakman captained Volendam in the 2016–17 season, making 35 league appearances and scoring seven goals. In the 2016–17 KNVB Cup, he scored an extra-time equaliser against Almere City on 25 October 2016, set up by Steltenpool, who then scored the winner. He also scored in a 4–1 win over VVSB in the last 16, as Volendam reached the quarter-finals before losing on penalties to Sparta Rotterdam.

On 6 February 2017, Kwakman opened the scoring with a volley from his weaker right foot in a 2–1 home win over FC Den Bosch, his fifth league goal of the season. He called it a "world goal" and said that the ball had been so high in the air that he thought it would land either in famous singer and Volendammer Jan Smit's swimming pool or in the net, and that it had the difficulty level of a Champions League goal. Volendam reached the promotion play-offs and lost 4–2 on aggregate to NAC in the semi-finals in May 2017. Kwakman said afterwards that his side had simply been a size too small.

Injury limited Kwakman to 12 league appearances in the 2017–18 season. In late February 2018, he was substituted at half-time of a 5–2 defeat to Telstar, and a few days later he announced his retirement from professional football with immediate effect. Head coach Misha Salden said that the decision had been coming and that the team would miss him greatly, particularly on the training ground. Kwakman cited physical problems, and in a message on the club's website he said that he had been "a privileged man for 15 years".

== Style of play ==
Kwakman could play both in defence or in defensive midfield. He started out as a midfielder and was moved to centre-back as an under-19 player, and he later described himself in his early years as a naive defender who went forward too often until coach Robert Maaskant curbed the habit. He was used mainly in midfield at NAC, while at Augsburg Luhukay played him in central defence, and Kwakman said that he was often brought in when a centre-back was missing because of his height and heading ability. Kwakman is left-footed, and he was a regular threat from set pieces. He captained Groningen, NAC and Volendam, and at Volendam he and Tuijp acted as mentors to the club's younger players.

== Media career ==
After retiring, Kwakman joined Fox Sports as a studio analyst in 2018, initially working alongside Erik Meijer. The channel was renamed ESPN on 1 January 2021, and he continued as an Eredivisie analyst on programmes such as De Eretribune. He has worked alongside analysts including Kenneth Pérez, Arnold Bruggink and Marciano Vink, and in 2025 he was among ESPN's voters for its FC 100 list of the world's best players. He also hosted a talk show on the local broadcaster RTV L.O.V.E.

Kwakman has remained involved with Volendam from the outside. He was part of a technical advisory group with Tuijp and Arnold Mühren, which NH reported had ended because the club did too little with its advice. In October 2021, on the NH talk show De Aftrap, he criticised the club for leaving almost every decision to head coach Wim Jonk and his staff. In December 2023, he ruled out taking a role at the club, and in February 2025 he revealed that Volendam had sounded him out about becoming technical director, an approach he declined because he lacked the experience.

In the summer of 2023, Kwakman was a contestant on the quiz show De Slimste Mens. In 2026, he was one of eleven former footballers, among them the De Boer twins, Wesley Sneijder and Ryan Babel, in the Videoland reality series Football Island, a survival and challenge format filmed in the Dominican Republic. He reached the three-man final, which was won by Frank de Boer, with Ronald de Boer the other finalist. FC Augsburg's website reported that the series drew around one million viewers.

== Personal life ==
Kwakman is married with Kelly and has a son, Tibbe, who was born in Volendam in 2008, and a daughter. His wife initially had doubts about the move to South Africa but came to enjoy living there. In Volendam, Kwakman is known by the nickname Ballap. He is a tennis fan, and his father is a keen supporter of FC Augsburg. He is not related to the Volendam-born midfielder Dave Kwakman.

== Career statistics ==
Appearances and goals by club, season and competition
Club	Season	League		
Club	Season	Division	Apps	Goals
FC Volendam	2004–05	Eerste Divisie	33	8
FC Volendam	2005–06	Eerste Divisie	36	2
FC Volendam	Total		69	10
RBC Roosendaal	2006–07	Eerste Divisie	36	6
RBC Roosendaal	2007–08	Eerste Divisie	34	6
RBC Roosendaal	Total		70	12
NAC Breda	2008–09	Eredivisie	35	4
NAC Breda	2009–10	Eredivisie	34	6
NAC Breda	2010–11	Eredivisie	4	0
NAC Breda	Total		73	10
FC Augsburg	2010–11	2. Bundesliga	20	0
Groningen	2011–12	Eredivisie	14	0
Groningen	2012–13	Eredivisie	35	1
Groningen	Total		49	1
NAC Breda	2013–14	Eredivisie	28	3
Bidvest Wits	2014–15	Premiership	18	2
FC Volendam	2015–16	Eerste Divisie	14	4
FC Volendam	2016–17	Eerste Divisie	35	7
FC Volendam	2017–18	Eerste Divisie	12	1
FC Volendam	Total		61	12
Career total			388	50

== Honours ==
FC Augsburg

- 2. Bundesliga runner-up: 2010–11
