= Paul van Zuijlen =

Dutch plastic surgeon

- Born: 30 May 1969 (age 57); Oss, Netherlands
- Known for: Patient and Observer Scar Assessment Scale (POSAS)
- Scientific career
- Fields: Plastic surgery, burn care
- Workplaces: Red Cross Hospital, Beverwijk; Amsterdam UMC
- Thesis: Perspectives on burn scar evaluation and artificial skin (2002)

Paul P. M. van Zuijlen (born 30 May 1969) is a Dutch plastic surgeon who specialises in burns and scarring. He holds an endowed chair in burn medicine at Amsterdam UMC and is medical director of the burn centre at the Red Cross Hospital in Beverwijk. He is best known for the Patient and Observer Scar Assessment Scale (POSAS), a scar rating tool developed by his group in Beverwijk that researchers in several other countries have since translated and tested.

== Early life and education ==
Van Zuijlen was born in Oss. He studied medicine at the University of Amsterdam. In his fourth year a lecture by Rudy Hermans, the founder of the Dutch Burns Foundation, got him interested in burn care. By 1990, while still a student, he was doing research at the Beverwijk burn centre on how well burned hands worked years after the injury. He qualified as a doctor in 1995, spent some months as a surgical resident, and went back to Beverwijk in 1996 as a research fellow to run a clinical trial of a dermal substitute. His PhD thesis, on measuring burn scars and on artificial skin, was accepted by the University of Amsterdam in 2002; his supervisors were R. W. Kreis and K. E. Bos. He then trained in plastic surgery at the Academic Medical Center in Amsterdam and in Beverwijk, and used a fellowship from the Dutch Burns Foundation to visit burn centres abroad.

== Career ==
He joined the Red Cross Hospital as a plastic surgeon in 2006. In 2010 the Dutch Burns Foundation set up an endowed chair in burn medicine for him at Vrije Universiteit Amsterdam and VU University Medical Center, aimed at scars that function and look better. He gave his inaugural lecture, Multidisciplinaire brandwondengeneeskunde: nieuwe dimensies in perspectief (Multidisciplinary burn medicine: new dimensions in perspective), on 7 April 2011. He went on to become medical director of the Beverwijk centre, one of only three specialised burn centres in the Netherlands. Since 2021 he has led, together with Kees van der Vlies and Eelke Bosma, a programme shared by all three centres, for which the health research funder ZonMw provided almost €3 million.

He was a trainee in Beverwijk when the Volendam New Year's fire broke out on 1 January 2001, and was among the first doctors to treat the injured. In 2025, after the Kočani nightclub fire in North Macedonia, he coordinated how the Dutch burn centres would take in patients.

== Research ==
=== Patient and Observer Scar Assessment Scale ===
The POSAS first appeared in Plastic and Reconstructive Surgery in 2004, with Lieneke Draaijers as first author and Van Zuijlen as senior author. The scale has two halves. A clinician scores how the scar looks and feels, and the patient scores it as well, including symptoms such as itching. A version for linear surgical scars came out in 2005. Patients and an international Delphi panel helped shape version 3.0, and a scale for children followed in 2026.

Other groups have adopted the scale. In 2012 Australian researchers reviewed 18 burn scar rating scales, and the POSAS was the only one to receive a high quality score, which it earned for reliability. A 2010 review noted that the Vancouver Scar Scale was still used most often, but judged the POSAS the most comprehensive, because it also asks the patient. Canadian researchers tested it on scars after breast cancer surgery, and it has been translated and validated in Italy, Brazil and Thailand. The Italian team behind the first validation of version 3.0 in any language described it as one of the most comprehensive scar assessment tools in use worldwide. De Telegraaf reported in 2017 that the scale was in use in the United States, Canada, Australia, China, Japan, Sweden and South Korea, among other countries, and had become the standard in the United Kingdom.

=== Tissue engineering and reconstruction ===
His group grows cartilage in the laboratory with the aim of rebuilding ears and noses after facial burns, and images the collagen and blood vessels in skin and scar tissue. In 2015 VU University Medical Center said it would start 3D-printing cartilage implants for ears and noses made to fit individual patients; Van Zuijlen told NOS that the printer had been tested for a year. Ernst Jan Bos, one of his PhD students, completed his doctorate in 2019 with work on cartilage regeneration and 3D-printed scaffolds for facial reconstruction. Van Zuijlen and Maling Gou edited a thematic series on 3D bioprinting for the journal Burns & Trauma.

As a surgeon he has used perforator flaps to treat burn scars that contract. His team reported on 22 patients in Plastic and Reconstructive Surgery in 2011: the transferred skin did not shrink, and on average its area grew by 20 percent.

=== Complexity science ===
In 2019 and 2020 he spent a year as a fellow of the Institute for Advanced Study at the University of Amsterdam, building computer models of how the immune system responds to a burn. In a 2022 paper in the Journal of Burn Care & Research, he and his co-authors argued that burn care should be treated as a complex adaptive system.

=== Research output ===
A 2025 bibliometric study of research on reconstructing burned hands found that he and Fatih Uygur had published more in that field than anyone else. The Amsterdam UMC research portal lists 251 research outputs under his name.

== Professional service and recognition ==
In 2020 he was the Skoog Visiting Professor at Uppsala University Hospital. He has sat on the board of the European Burns Association since 2022, chairs its research committee and is its national delegate for the Netherlands. For the International Society for Burn Injuries he served on the committee that wrote practice guidelines for burn care in places with limited resources, published in two parts in 2016 and 2018. He has chaired the Dutch Burn Care Association (Nederlandse Vereniging voor Brandwondenzorg), and led the working group that wrote the Dutch clinical guideline on keloids and hypertrophic scars. Since 2018 he has gone on surgical missions in Africa with Doctors of the World.

== Selected publications ==
- Draaijers, L. J.; et al. (2004). "The patient and observer scar assessment scale: a reliable and feasible tool for scar evaluation". Plastic and Reconstructive Surgery. 113 (7): 1960–1965. doi:10.1097/01.prs.0000122207.28773.56. PMID 15253184.
- van de Kar, A. L.; et al. (2005). "Reliable and feasible evaluation of linear scars by the Patient and Observer Scar Assessment Scale". Plastic and Reconstructive Surgery. 116 (2): 514–522. doi:10.1097/01.prs.0000172982.43599.d6. PMID 16079683.
- Visscher, D. O.; et al. (2017). "MRI and Additive Manufacturing of Nasal Alar Constructs for Patient-specific Reconstruction". Scientific Reports. 7 (1) 10021. Bibcode:2017NatSR...710021V. doi:10.1038/s41598-017-10602-9. PMC 5577227. PMID 28855717.
- Varkey, M.; Visscher, D. O.; van Zuijlen, P. P. M.; Atala, A.; Yoo, J. J. (2019). "Skin bioprinting: the future of burn wound reconstruction?". Burns & Trauma. 7 s41038-019-0142-7: 4. doi:10.1186/s41038-019-0142-7. PMC 6371568. PMID 30805375.
- van Zuijlen, P. P. M.; et al. (2022). "The Future of Burn Care From a Complexity Science Perspective". Journal of Burn Care & Research. 43 (6): 1312–1321. doi:10.1093/jbcr/irac029. PMC 9629443. PMID 35267022.
