= Theo Timmermans =

Theo Timmermans may refer to:

- Theo Timmermans (footballer, born 1989)
- Theo Timmermans (footballer, born 1926)
