= Yannick de Wit =

Dutch footballer

Personal information
- Date of birth: 26 August 1986 (age 40)
- Place of birth: Zaanstad, Netherlands
- Height: 1.85 m (6 ft 1 in)
- Position: Midfielder

Team information
- Current team: Blauw-Wit Beursbengels

Youth career
- KFC
- Ajax
- 2005–2010: Volendam

Senior career*
Years	Team	Apps	(Gls)
2006–2010	Volendam	81	(5)
2011–2012	Go Ahead Eagles	0	(0)
2012–2014	Emmen	32	(0)
2014–2017	ASV De Dijk	?	(?)
2017–2020	HBOK	?	(?)
2020–	Blauw-Wit Beursbengels	?	(?)
- * Club domestic league appearances and goals as of 14 October 2020

Yannick de Wit (born 26 August 1986) is a Dutch footballer who plays as a midfielder for Tweede Klasse club Blauw-Wit Beursbengels.

== Career ==
Born in Zaanstad, De Wit is a product of the Ajax youth system. He also played for FC Volendam, Go Ahead Eagles and FC Emmen. After leaving the latter, De Wit started playing amateur football for ASV De Dijk and later moved to HBOK. In June 2020, he joined seventh-tier Tweede Klasse club Blauw-Wit Beursbengels.
