= Adnane Tighadouini =

Moroccan footballer (born 1992)

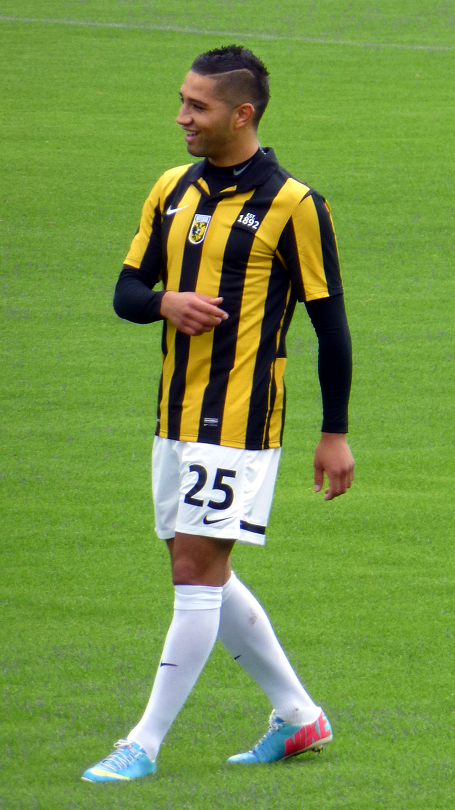
- Tighadouini with Vitesse in 2013

Personal information
- Date of birth: 30 October 1992 (age 34)
- Place of birth: Ede, Netherlands
- Height: 1.79 m (5 ft 10 in)
- Position: Winger

Youth career
- VV Ede
- Blauw-Geel '55
- 2003–2012: Vitesse

Senior career*
Years	Team	Apps	(Gls)
2011–2014	Vitesse	3	(1)
2012	→ Volendam (loan)	9	(2)
2012–2013	→ Cambuur (loan)	22	(7)
2014–2015	NAC Breda	42	(15)
2015–2019	Málaga	10	(1)
2016	→ Kayserispor (loan)	7	(0)
2016–2017	→ Vitesse (loan)	25	(3)
2017–2018	→ Twente (loan)	24	(2)
2018–2019	→ Esbjerg (loan)	17	(4)
2020	Al-Kharaitiyat	3	(1)
2020	Maghreb de Fès	0	(0)
Total		162	(36)

International career
2012	Morocco U20	2	(0)
2011–	Morocco U23	5	(1)
2015	Morocco	1	(0)
- * Club domestic league appearances and goals

Adnane Tighadouini (Arabic: عدنان تيغدويني, romanized: Adnān Tīghdūīnī; Berber languages: ⵄⴰⴷⵏⴰⵏ ⵜⵉⴴⴰⴷⵡⵉⵏⵉ, romanized: Adnan Tiğdwinin; born 30 October 1992) is a former professional footballer who played as a left winger. Born in the Netherlands, he represented Morocco at international level.

== Club career ==
=== Vitesse ===
Born in Ede, Tighadouini joined Vitesse Arnhem's youth setup in 2003, after appearing for VV Ede and VV Blauw Geel '55. He made his professional – and Eredivisie – debut on 24 April 2011, coming on as a second-half substitute for Davy Pröpper in a 4–2 away loss against FC Utrecht, in which he also scored the last goal.

Tighadouini played his second match in a 2–1 defeat at PSV Eindhoven on 1 May 2011. On 10 January of the following year, after appearing only once during the whole campaign, he was loaned to FC Volendam until June.

On 27 August 2012, Tighadouini moved to SC Cambuur, in a season-long loan deal. On 30 November he scored a brace in a 3–2 home win against SC Telstar.

=== NAC Breda ===
On 3 January 2014, after receiving no playing time, Tighadouini signed a 3.5-year contract with NAC Breda. He made his debut for the club on the 18th, replacing Anouar Hadouir in a 3–0 away loss against AZ Alkmaar.

Tighadouini was an undisputed starter for NAC during the 2014–15 campaign, scoring 14 goals in 33 matches. Highlights included braces against former clubs Vitesse and Cambuur, FC Dordrecht and FC Groningen.

=== Málaga ===
On 10 July 2015, it was announced that Tighadouini had signed a five-year deal with Spanish La Liga side Málaga CF. He made his debut on 13 September, replacing compatriot Nordin Amrabat for the final seven minutes of a goalless draw against SD Eibar at the Estadio La Rosaleda. On 24 October, he scored his first goal for the Andalusians, opening their 2–0 home win over Deportivo de La Coruña.

After just 12 competitive appearances in the first half of the season, Tighadouini was loaned to Kayserispor for its second half.

==== Vitesse (loan) ====
On 30 August 2016, Tighadouini re-joined Vitesse on a season-long loan. On 11 September 2016, he made his Vitesse return in a 1–0 away defeat against Ajax, replacing Chelsea loanee Nathan in the 64th minute. On 22 September 2016, he went on to score a brace in a 7–2 victory over Derde Divisie side ASV De Dijk in the KNVB Cup, scoring both goals in the space of four minutes.

Tighadouini went on to win the 2017 Dutch Cup for Vitesse. He replaced Nathan Allan de Souza after 73 minutes of the final. Due to this result, the club won the KNVB Cup for the first time in its 125-year history.

==== Twente (loan) ====
On 23 August 2017, Tighadouini joined FC Twente on loan for the entire season.

=== Later career ===
During the 2018–19 season, Tighadouini was on loan with Danish Superliga club Esbjerg fB. In September 2019, he became a free agent after terminating his contract with Málaga. He subsequently joined Qatari club Al-Kharaitiyat in February 2020. In November 2020, he signed with Moroccan club Maghreb de Fès but was sidelined for eight months due to a severe COVID-19 infection. He later trained briefly with Vitesse but had to withdraw after contracting COVID-19 again. He resumed training in 2022; however, as of 2024, he has not secured a new club.

== International career ==
Tighadouini played for the Morocco under-23 team in the 2011 CAF U-23 Championship. He scored his first goal in the category on 29 November, netting the game's only against Algeria.

In October 2015, he was first called up to the senior Morocco national team, and he made his debut for the senior team in a World Cup qualifying 1–0 loss against Equatorial Guinea on 15 November 2015, being taken off after 38 minutes for Omar El Kaddouri at the Estadio de Bata.

== Career statistics ==
As of match played 24 November 2017.

Appearances and goals by club, season and competition
Club	Season	League			Cup		Europe		Other		Total	
Club	Season	Division	Apps	Goals	Apps	Goals	Apps	Goals	Apps	Goals	Apps	Goals
Vitesse	2010–11	Eredivisie	2	1	0	0	—		—		2	1
Vitesse	2011–12	Eredivisie	1	0	0	0	—		0	0	1	0
Vitesse	Total		3	1	0	0	—		0	0	3	1
Volendam (loan)	2011–12	Eerste Divisie	9	2	0	0	—		—		9	2
Cambuur (loan)	2012–13	Eerste Divisie	22	7	3	0	—		—		25	7
NAC Breda	2013–14	Eredivisie	9	1	0	0	—		—		9	1
NAC Breda	2014–15	Eredivisie	33	14	2	1	—		4 (Note: Appearance(s) in 2014–15 Eredivisie Promotion/relegation play-offs)	1	39	16
NAC Breda	Total		42	15	2	1	—		4	1	48	17
Málaga	2015–16	La Liga	10	1	2	0	—		—		12	1
Kayserispor (loan)	2015–16	Süper Lig	7	0	0	0	—		—		7	0
Vitesse (loan)	2016–17	Eredivisie	25	3	6	4	—		—		31	7
Twente (loan)	2017–18	Eredivisie	10	0	2	2	—		—		12	2
Career total			128	29	15	7	0	0	4	1	147	37

== Honours ==
=== Club ===
Vitesse

- KNVB Cup: 2016–17
