= Ties Evers =

Dutch professional footballer

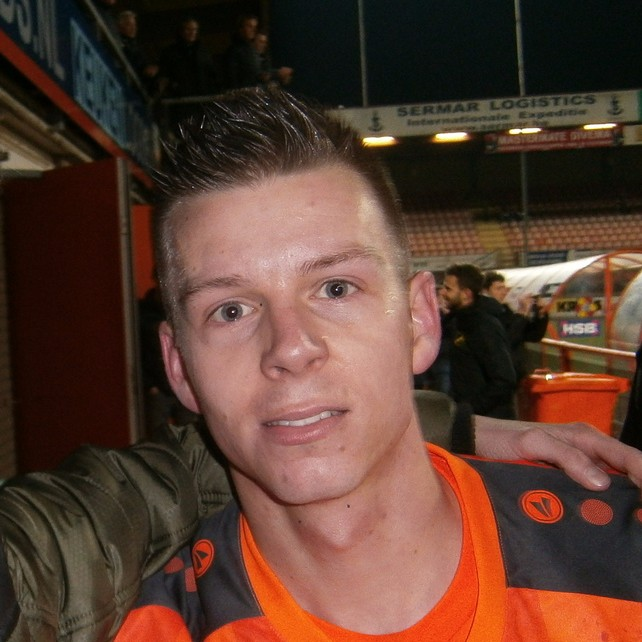
- Evers in January 2016.

Personal information
- Date of birth: 14 March 1991 (age 35)
- Place of birth: Gaanderen, Netherlands
- Position: Right back

Youth career
- VVG '25

Senior career*
Years	Team	Apps	(Gls)
2010–2014	De Graafschap	54	(0)
2012–2013	→ AGOVV (loan)	16	(0)
2014–2019	Volendam	121	(1)
2019–2021	VVSB	17	(0)
- * Club domestic league appearances and goals as of 00:14, 7 February 2020 (UTC)

Ties Evers (born 14 March 1991) is a Dutch retired footballer who played as a right back.

== Club career ==
He made his professional debut for De Graafschap on 22 September 2010 against FC Utrecht and the club loaned him to AGOVV Apeldoorn for the 2012–13 season. He joined FC Volendam in summer 2014.

On 1 September 2019, Evers joined VVSB in the Derde Divisie on a contract until the summer 2020.

Living in Etten, Evers returned to play for childhood club VVG '25 in 2021 and later coached the club for three years between 2023 and 2026.
