= Jack Tuijp =

Dutch footballer (born 1983)

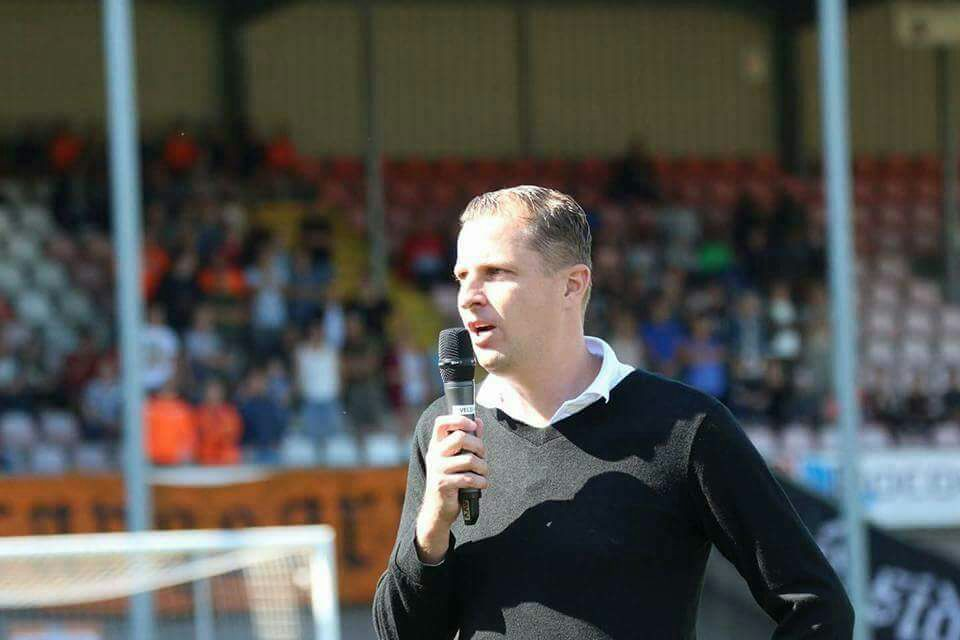
- Tuijp speaking to Volendam fans in 2017

Personal information
- Full name: Jacobus Johannes Tuijp
- Date of birth: 23 August 1983 (age 43)
- Place of birth: Volendam, Netherlands
- Height: 1.86 m (6 ft 1 in)
- Position: Striker

Youth career
- RKAV Volendam
- Volendam

Senior career*
Years	Team	Apps	(Gls)
2002–2004	Volendam	46	(14)
2004–2007	Groningen	11	(0)
2005–2007	→ Volendam (loan)	63	(25)
2007–2013	Volendam	187	(105)
2013–2015	Ferencváros	7	(1)
2014–2015	→ Helmond Sport (loan)	25	(6)
2015–2017	Volendam	54	(7)
2017	De Dijk	12	(5)
Total		405	(188)

International career
2003–2005	Netherlands U21	6	(1)
- * Club domestic league appearances and goals

Jacobus Johannes "Jack" Tuijp (born 23 August 1983) is a Dutch former professional footballer who played as a striker. He spent most of his career with FC Volendam. The media often misconstrued his surname as Tuyp.

Tuijp, born in Volendam, started his football career at RKAV Volendam like many other footballers from the fishing village. In the 2002–03 season, he made his debut in professional football for FC Volendam. After two seasons he left for Groningen. There he made eleven league appearances in his first season, after which the club sent him on loan to his old club for the next two seasons. After this, FC Volendam signed the striker on a permanent basis. He became a key player in the team and became the top goalscorer of the second-tier Eerste Divisie three times.

In the summer of 2013, Tuijp left for Hungary to play for top-tier club Ferencváros. After Dutch manager Ricardo Moniz was fired by the club in December, Tuijp did not make any more appearances. During the 2014–15 season, the club sent him on a one-season loan to Helmond Sport. In the summer of 2015, Tuijp returned to FC Volendam together with Kees Kwakman. After two seasons, his contract was not extended by the club, after which he signed with amateur club ASV De Dijk at the end of May 2017, which had been promoted to the third-tier Tweede Divisie the previous season. In January 2018, he announced his retirement from football due to unrest in the club. With 176 goals in 400 games, Tuijp number is two on the all-time topscorer list of Volendam, behind his great-uncle, Dick Tol.

== Club career ==
=== Volendam ===
Tuijp started playing football at RKAV Volendam and made the switch to the youth academy of FC Volendam as a teenager. In the 2002–03 season of the second-tier Eerste Divisie he was promoted to the first-team squad. On 8 November 2002, Tuijp made his debut in a 1–2 loss to Fortuna Sittard. He came on as a substitute after 72 minutes to replace Houssain Ouhsaine Ouichou. On 14 February 2003, Tuijp was in the starting line-up for the first time in an away match against HFC Haarlem and scored the only goal of the match, securing three points for Volendam. A week later, he scored again in a 6–1 victory over Go Ahead Eagles. On 19 June 2003, Tuijp scored the opening goal in the last group match of the promotion play-offs against Heracles. Volendam eventually won the game 3–1 and thus secured promotion to the Eredivisie as group winners. Tuijp scored ten goals in 24 appearances in his first season.

Tuijp made his debut at the highest level in the Eredivisie season opener against SC Heerenveen on 17 August 2003. Tuijp became the starting striker of the Volendam team under head coach Henk Wisman and later under his successor Johan Steur and scored his first Eredivisie goal one month after his debut in the league, in a match against ADO Den Haag. However, he was unable to surpass his number of goals from the previous season, as Volendam finished seventeenth and relegated to the Eerste Divisie.

In the Eredivisie, Volendam was the only club with semi-professional contracts in the team at the time. Tuijp was one of those players. He played under a youth contract and was simultaneously a student of business economics at the Hogeschool voor Economische Studies (Amsterdam University of Applied Sciences).

=== Groningen ===
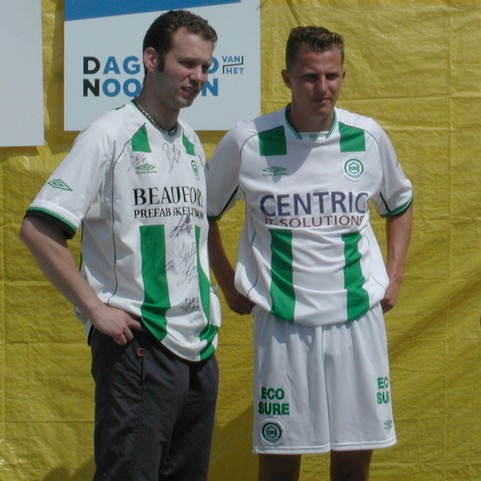
Tuijp (right) with Groningen

Tuijp left Volendam before their return to the Eerste Divisie, and signed a five-year contract with Eredivisie club Groningen in the summer of 2004, who paid approximately €800,000 for him. In his first season, however, he mainly had to make do with appearances as a substitute and out of the eleven games he played, he only started once. He returned to Volendam on a loan the following season. There, Tuijp came to play more and with the club he finished in third place behind title winners Excelsior and vice-champion VVV-Venlo that season. Tuijp and Volendam were unable to promote through the play-offs. In March 2006, towards the end of the season, Groningen released the news that Tuijp and teammate Kiran Bechan were allowed to look for a new club because there was no prospect of playing time in Groningen.

Groningen then decided to send Tuijp on loan again. Despite interest from Veendam and Dordrecht, he decided to stay in Volendam. He made 30 appearances that season, scoring ten goals.

=== Return to Volendam ===
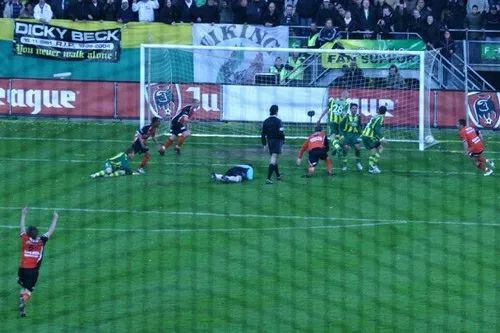
ADO - FC Volendam (0-1), Tuijp's goal promoting Volendam to the Eredivisie

In June 2007, Tuijp returned to Volendam, signing a three-year contract. Tuijp's first season back on a permanent contract was highly successful. In the last matchday, Volendam only needed to defeat ADO Den Haag to win the Eerste Divisie title. ADO played for a better position for the play-offs. After 26 minutes of play, Tuijp scored the only goal of the game and thus secured the title for Volendam and a return to the Eredivisie after an absence of four seasons. Tuijp scored eight goals in the last six league games (including a hat-trick against SC Cambuur) and became the top goalscorer of the Eerste Divisie with 26 goals. Tuijp had made a bet with Volendam-based singer Jan Smit prior to the season, that if he scored 25 or more goals, Smit had to compose a new club song. Tuijp achieved this number on 4 April in a match against AGOVV (3–6 win).

==== 2008–09: Eredivisie ====
Prior to the 2008–09 season, Tuijp extended his expiring contract with Volendam until mid-2011. Again, the return to the highest level was short lived. Tuijp started the season well and scored twice in the first game against Heerenveen, but could not prevent Heerenveen winning 2–3. After this, there was no winning for seven weeks. On 2 November 2008, Volendam only booked its second victory, against De Graafschap (3–1). Tuijp scored once in the match. Still, the team from Volendam continued to struggle and occupied the lowest positions in the league table throughout the season. Tuijp was, however, successful with Volendam in the KNVB Cup. In the second round, in which Volendam won over VVV-Venlo after a penalty shootout, Tuijp scored once. In the next round, Eredivisie club Ajax was the opponent. Against all odds, Volendam managed to drag the game into extra time. Tuijp scored the 1–0 in the second half of extra time and with that, Ajax were eliminated. Tuijp later indicated that this was one of the best moments of his career.

In December 2008, sports journalist Johan Derksen brought out a rumor in the talk show Voetbal International that Ajax would be interested in Tuijp. Tuijp later announced that Ajax had never contacted him nor Volendam. January 2009 saw the round of 16 of the KNVB Cup against Excelsior. In this matchup, Tuijp scored in cup for the third game in a row. After beating Roda JC in the quarter-finals, Volendam was eliminated in the semi-finals after a 2–0 defeat by Heerenveen. Tuijp was in the startling lineup and was replaced in the 65th minute by Melvin Platje. On the last day of the Eredivisie, Volendam played against direct relegation competitor De Graafschap. A victory had to be achieved to avoid direct relegation. Tuijp scored the 1–2 goal after 68 minutes on a pass from Platje, but ten minutes later the game reached its final result of 2–2 due to an own goal by Gerry Koning. Tuijp thereby suffered relegation with Volendam after one season at the highest level.

In the 2009–10 season, Tuijp achieved one of the worst results with Volendam. The club finished in 16th place of the second tier, the second lowest ranking ever. Tuijp did become club top scorer with 17 goals. The following season, Volendam finished in sixth place and thus qualified for the promotion play-offs. Volendam defeated MVV in the first round. In the second round, VVV-Venlo knocked Volendam out of contention. Tuijp appeared in all play-off matches. At the end of the season, he extended his contract by another two years.

==== 2011–13: Two-time top scorer ====
In the 2011–12 season, Tuijp managed to score eight goals in the "first period" and scored seven league matches in a row. This earned him his first "Bronze Bull" as the top scorer of the first period. In the last game of this series, he scored a hat-trick in a 6–1 win over AGOVV, who were declared bankrupt in 2013. With this, Tuijp brought his total number of league goals for Volendam to 109 and rose to second place on the all-time top scorers list based on league matches. Tuijp then scored twice against Telstar and Helmond Sport respectively. Tuijp also became top scorer in the "second period" and received his second Bronze Bull from singer Jan Smit. He finished the season with 20 goals and became the top scorer of the Eerste Divisie for the second time. Volendam ended the season in a disappointing twelfth place. Despite this, Tuijp was voted Volendam Player of the Season by the supporters at the end of the season.

Manager Hans de Koning appointed Tuijp team captain of Volendam ahead of the 2012–13 season. Tuijp again scored continuously for his club. He scored in 17 of the 28 games he played that season. He scored twice against FC Eindhoven (4–1), Excelsior (3–1) and FC Oss (2–2). On 10 February 2013, he scored three goals and assisted in a match against Telstar (6–2 win). Tuijp became the top scorer of the Eerste Divisie for the second time in a row and for the third time in his career. He finished the season with 27 league goals, breaking his personal record from the 2007–08 season. At the end of the season, Tuijp was voted Eerste Divisie Player of the Season and he received the "Gouden Stier" from Netherlands national team coach Louis van Gaal. Despite all these personal successes, Volendam missed out on promotion. On the last round of play, a draw was enough for the championship, but they lost to Go Ahead Eagles who would later achieve promotion to the Eredivisie via the play-offs at the expense of Volendam.

In March 2013, Volendam made an offer to extend Tuijp's expiring contract, but he did not accept. He indicated that he wanted to try his luck abroad and wanted to take advantage of his transfer-free status next summer. Tuijp had also wanted to leave the Palingboeren the previous season, after Azerbaijani club Khazar Lankaran had shown their interest. Volendam's asking price had been too high for the club, however, which resulted in the transfer failing to go through. The free agent Tuijp enjoyed the interest of Greek club AEK Athens in the summer of 2013, but again a move failed to go through.

=== Ferencváros ===
"I've had the thought: should I retire? But the life of a football player is so great, that I had to continue."

— Jack Tuijp in August 2015 about his time at Ferencváros.

On 8 July 2013, Tuijp signed a two-year contract with Ferencvárosi TC. He met many fellow countrymen at the Hungarian club, including Julian Jenner, Mark Otten and Arsenio Valpoort who already played for Ferencváros, with Ricardo Moniz as the head coach. Tuijp made his debut for the club on 27 July during the season opener against Pécsi MFC. He scored the opening goal after 28 minutes. After Pécs equalized after an hour of play, Ferencváros eventually won the match 1–2, thanks to a goal from fellow countryman Arsenio Valpoort in the 77th minute.

Tuijp, however, lost his starting place after four games. He then suffered an ankle injury during practice in October which kept him out of lineup for two months. On 30 November, he made his comeback in a game against Pécsi MFC, when he came on as a substitute in injury time. Three days later, manager Moniz was fired due to disappointing results. At the end of September, teammate Akeem Adams suffered a cardiac arrest and after that only one game was won. In the last match before the winter break, Tuijp sat on the bench under interim trainer Csaba Máté the entire game. On 8 December, Thomas Doll was appointed as the new manager. The German coach soon decided that Tuijp did not fit into his system and brought in a new striker in Benjamin Lauth. In February 2014, Tuijp was demoted to the second team together with Mark Otten and Arsenio Valpoort.

After the end of the season, Ferencváros wanted Tuijp to terminate his contract, but he did not consent. The club then began to isolate Tuijp. His access card to the main gate of the club complex was revoked and he had to practice individually and without a ball three times a day. In addition, he missed social contact because all Dutch players had since left.

==== Loan to Helmond Sport ====
On 14 August 2014, it was announced that Tuijp would return to the Netherlands to finish the season on loan at Helmond Sport. However, he was not yet fit to play, which meant he was not part of the matchday squad for the season opener against Jong FC Twente. A week later, he made his debut in a match against FC Oss (2–1 win). Tuijp came on as a substitute after 73 minutes to replace Oumar Diouck. On 3 October, Tuijp scored his first goal for Helmond Sport in a match against VVV-Venlo. Nevertheless, VVV won 2–1. In November, he scored in three consecutive matches against Telstar, Achilles '29 and Jong PSV. In the penultimate game before the winter break, Tuijp suffered a hamstring injury, which prevented him from playing his old club Volendam a week later. Due to persistent injuries, Tuijp played less and less for Helmond Sport in the second half of the season and eventually lost his starting place.

A special moment took place during the last game of the season, against Telstar. In the final minutes, Telstar received a penalty kick and goalkeeper Wouter van der Steen was sent off with a red card. However, Helmond Sport had already made three substitutions, forcing Jack Tuijp to put on the goalkeeper gloves. He was unable to stop the effort of Tim Keurntjes, who thus brought the final score to 4–0.

=== Third spell at Volendam ===
On 6 May 2015, FC Volendam announced through their official channels that Tuijp and Kees Kwakman were returning to the club ahead of the upcoming season. Tuijp started his third spell at the club and Kwakman returned for his second stint. The Volendam born duo signed a contract for two and three years respectively. Tuijp had an excellent start to the season. He scored in the first four matches against NAC Breda, Den Bosch, Dordrecht (two goals) and Fortuna Sittard. However, this was followed by a long goal drought. Volendam nevertheless won the "first period" unbeaten. On 19 February 2017, Tuijp scored again in a draw against Almere City. He finished the season with eight league goals and was second on the club top goalscorer list behind Bert Steltenpool.

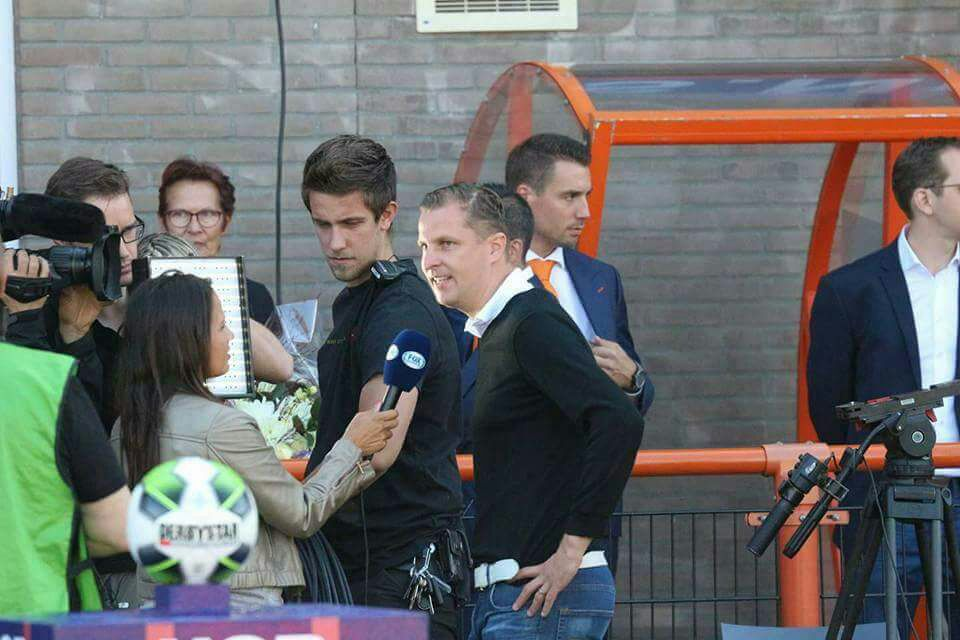
Tuijp being interviewed by Fox Sports in 2017

Tuijp scored his first goal of the 2016–17 season on 12 August 2016 in a match against FC Eindhoven (0–1 win). In the two games that followed, he scored both times. Tuijp scored three goals in September. First, Volendam surprisingly won over league leaders VVV-Venlo thanks to his goal with a small margin. A week later, on 16 September, he scored twice against Jong FC Utrecht. Four days later, Tuijp played for Volendam in the first round of the KNVB Cup against MVV Maastricht. Volendam fell behind 1–3 in the 62nd minute, after Tuijp had previously scored Volendam's first goal. Tuijp then scored in the 71st and in the 77th minute and forced extra time with his hat-trick. No goals fell in extra time, after which Volendam won on penalty shootout and advanced in the tournament. In March 2017, Volendam announced that they were not renewing his expiring contract. Tuijp appeared less and less in the second half of the season under manager Robert Molenaar, who preferred Steltenpool. On 21 April 2017, Tuijp scored his last goal as a player for Volendam in a match against FC Oss (2–2). Thanks to his goal in injury time, Volendam secured one point in the game. At the end of the season, Volendam qualified for the promotion play-offs with sixth place. First opponent was NAC Breda. After not appearing in the lost home game, interim coach Johan Steur brought on Tuijp after 73 minutes to replace Rihairo Meulens. NAC won 2–0 at home and advanced to the next round. After this last game, Tuijp was thanked by the accompanying fans and left in tears. Tuijp made a total of 400 appearances for Volendam, in which he scored 176 times. He went into the books as second on Volendam's all-time top scorers list, behind Dick Tol (276 goals).

On 3 September 2017, prior to the match between Volendam and SC Cambuur, Tuijp said his goodbye to the fans. He received a certificate from Volendam for having played in the first team of the club for more than ten seasons and was appointed Member of Merit.

=== De Dijk ===
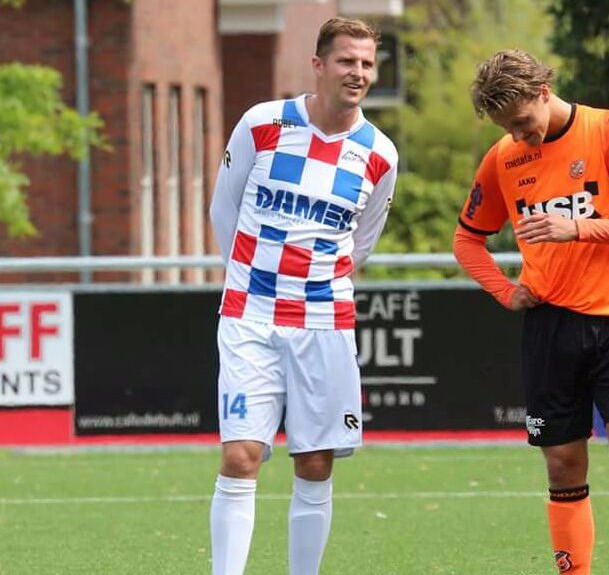
Tuijp with ASV De Dijk in 2017

After it was announced in late March 2017 that Tuijp was going to leave FC Volendam at the end of the season, he started looking for a new club. No other professional club was deemed interesting, as Tuijp, who lives in Volendam, had just become the father of his second child and did not want to travel far. After the last match of the season, Tuijp said in an interview with Fox Sports that he was in talks with a club in the third-tier Tweede Divisie. Ten days later, he signed a contract one-year contract with ASV De Dijk, who had been promoted to the Tweede Divisie the previous season. The club had already tried to sign him a year earlier, but Tuijp had indicated at the time that he wanted to serve out his contract with Volendam. He was brought in as the successor of striker Dennis Kaars who left for Den Bosch. At De Dijk, Tuijp was reunited with former teammates Jeroen Verhoeven, Frank Schilder, Maarten Woudenberg, Ahmed Ahahaoui and Harry Zwarthoed.

On 5 August 2017, De Dijk played a friendly match against Volendam at Sportpark Schellingwoude. It was the second time for Tuijp that he played against Volendam. (Note: Tuijp previously played a league match against FC Volendam on behalf of Helmond Sport on 20 March 2015, according to various match reports.) Volendam won the match 4–0, thanks to goals from Kevin van Kippersluis, Joey Veerman, Alex Plat and an own goal from goalkeeper Jeroen Verhoeven. On 2 September, Tuijp made his official debut for De Dijk in the Tweede Divisie in a match against Jong Sparta (1–0 win). He came in after 56 minutes to replace Robert Verschraagen. More than a month later he scored his first goal for the team in a 3–1 victory over BVV Barendrecht. On 25 October, Tuijp returned to Volendam's home ground Kras Stadion for a while, as De Dijk played a KNVB Cup match against Ajax and because their own ground could not be used for safety reasons, it was decided to move to the FC Volendam stadium. Ajax won the game 4–1.

On 7 November, Heino Braspenning stopped as the main sponsor of ASV De Dijk with immediate effect. The reason for this was a conflict within the club. That led the then board to send verbal intimidation and threats. Due to all the unrest, several players decided to leave the club, including Tuijp. Tuijp announced on 31 January 2018 that he would immediately stop at ASV De Dijk and retire from football. Abderrahim Loukili, Jerghinio Sahadewsing and Nabil el Gourari had at the point already left the club. Tuijp made a total of fourteen appearances for De Dijk, in which he scored five goals.

== International career ==
Tuijp made his debut for the Netherlands U21 team on 20 May 2003 in a friendly international against Belgium U21. On 2 September 2003, he was called up together with Anouar Diba by interim national coach Cor Pot as additions for two qualifying matches for the 2004 UEFA European Under-21 Championship against Austria U21 and Czech Republic U21, respectively. Tuijp played in both games. In February 2004, he scored his first and only international goal in a 3–2 defeat against England U21. After Tuijp had moved from Volendam to Groningen in the summer of 2004, he was called up once more for the U21 team. Because Tuijp was behind Klaas-Jan Huntelaar on the depth chart, he mainly played in friendlies. In total, Tuijp made six international appearances, in which he managed to score one goal.

== Honours ==
Volendam

- Eerste Divisie: 2011–12

Individual

- Eerste Divisie Top Scorer Award: 2007–08, 2011–12, 2012–13
- Eerste Divisie Player of the Season: 2012–13
- Volendam Player of the Season: 2012–13
