= Danny van den Meiracker =

Dutch footballer

Personal information
- Date of birth: 27 March 1989 (age 37)
- Place of birth: Baarn, Netherlands
- Height: 1.91 m (6 ft 3 in)
- Position: Forward

Team information
- Current team: VVOG

Youth career
- Spakenburg

Senior career*
| Years | Team | Apps | (Gls) |
| 2010–2012 | Spakenburg | 53 | (34) |
| 2012–2013 | NEC | 5 | (0) |
| 2013–2015 | FC Oss | 10 | (2) |
| 2015–2017 | Spakenburg | 41 | (22) |
| 2017–2018 | Lienden | 45 | (34) |
| 2018–2022 | IJsselmeervogels | 81 | (45) |
| 2022–2024 | Quick Boys | 41 | (18) |
| 2024 | IJsselmeervogels | 14 | (8) |
| 2024– | VVOG | | |
- * Club domestic league appearances and goals as of 22 November 2024

Danny van den Meiracker is a Dutch footballer who plays as a forward for VVOG in the Dutch Vierde Divisie.
