= Abdülhamit Yıldız =

Turkish footballer

Personal information
- Date of birth: 7 June 1987 (age 39)
- Place of birth: Diyarbakır, Turkey
- Height: 1.86 m (6 ft 1 in)
- Positions: Defensive midfielder; right back; centre back

Youth career
- Hollandia
- –2006: Volendam

Senior career*
| Years | Team | Apps | (Gls) |
| 2006–2009 | Volendam | 44 | (1) |
| 2010–2011 | Gençlerbirliği | 0 | (0) |
| 2010–2011 | → Hacettepe (loan) | 6 | (0) |
| 2011–2012 | Kasımpaşa | 23 | (1) |
| 2012–2014 | Şanlıurfaspor | 47 | (2) |
| 2014–2015 | Balıkesirspor | 18 | (1) |
| 2016–2018 | Karşıyaka | 50 | (4) |
| 2018–2020 | Fatih Karagümrük | 35 | (3) |
| 2020 | Altay | 11 | (0) |
| 2020–2021 | Balıkesirspor | 12 | (0) |
| 2021–2022 | Çorum | 27 | (1) |
- * Club domestic league appearances and goals as of 7 May 2022

Abdülhamit Yıldız (born 7 June 1987) is a Turkish footballer. He previously played for Dutch side FC Volendam.
