= Levi Marengo =

Dutch footballer

Levi Luis Marengo (born 20 January 1987, in Paramaribo) is a Dutch professional footballer who played as a forward for the AZ Alkmaar youth team in 2006–07, CD Ourense from 2007 to 2009, Eerste Divisie club Stormvogels Telstar in 2009–10 and Jove Español since then. Besides the Netherlands, he has played in Spain.
