= Volendam New Year's fire =

2001 fire in Volendam, Netherlands

- Rescue operations after the fire
- Date: 1 January 2001
- Location: Volendam, Netherlands; 52°29′34.4″N 5°4′26.3″E
- Type: Fire
- Deaths: 14
- Injuries: 241

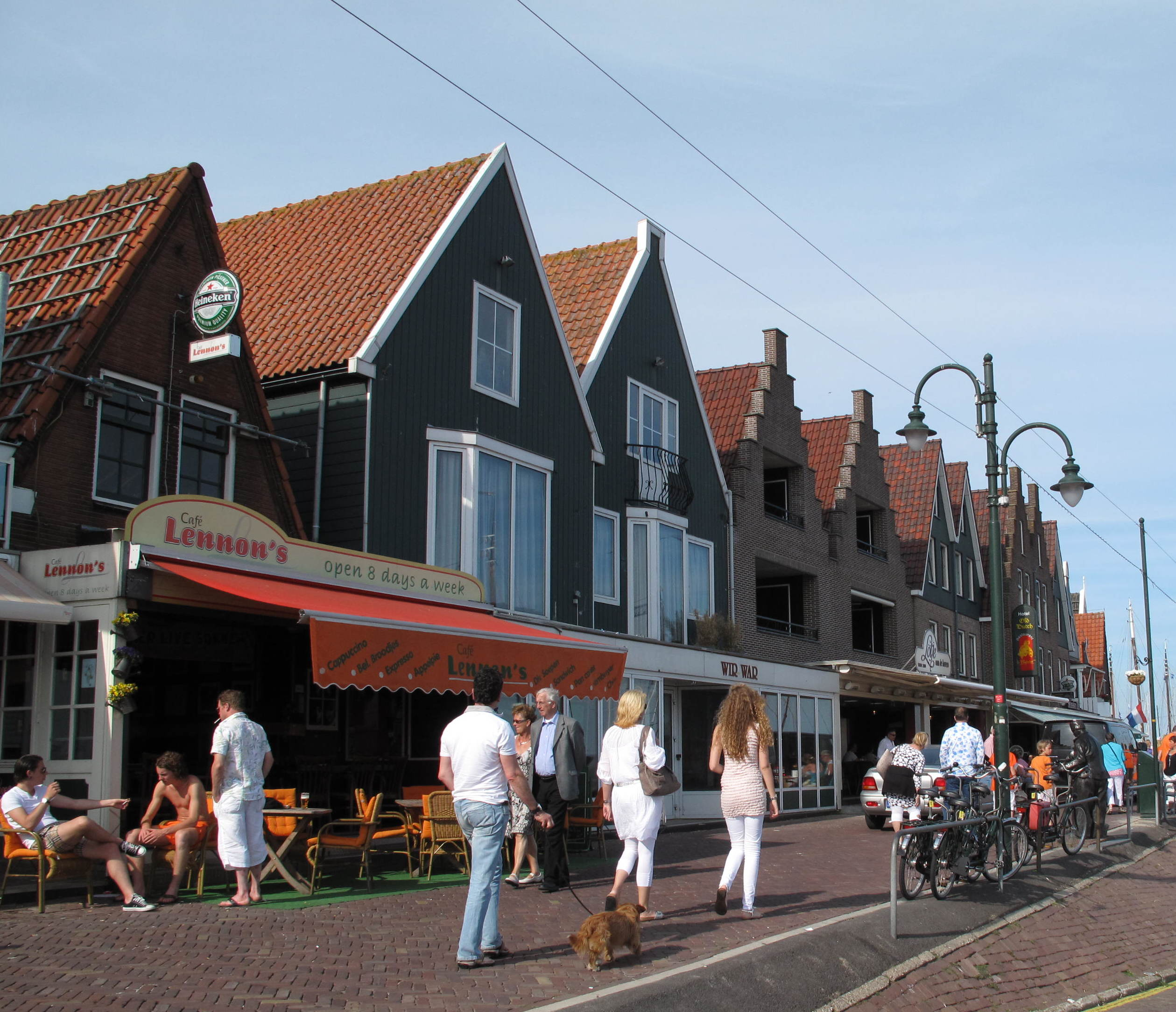
The building in 2010

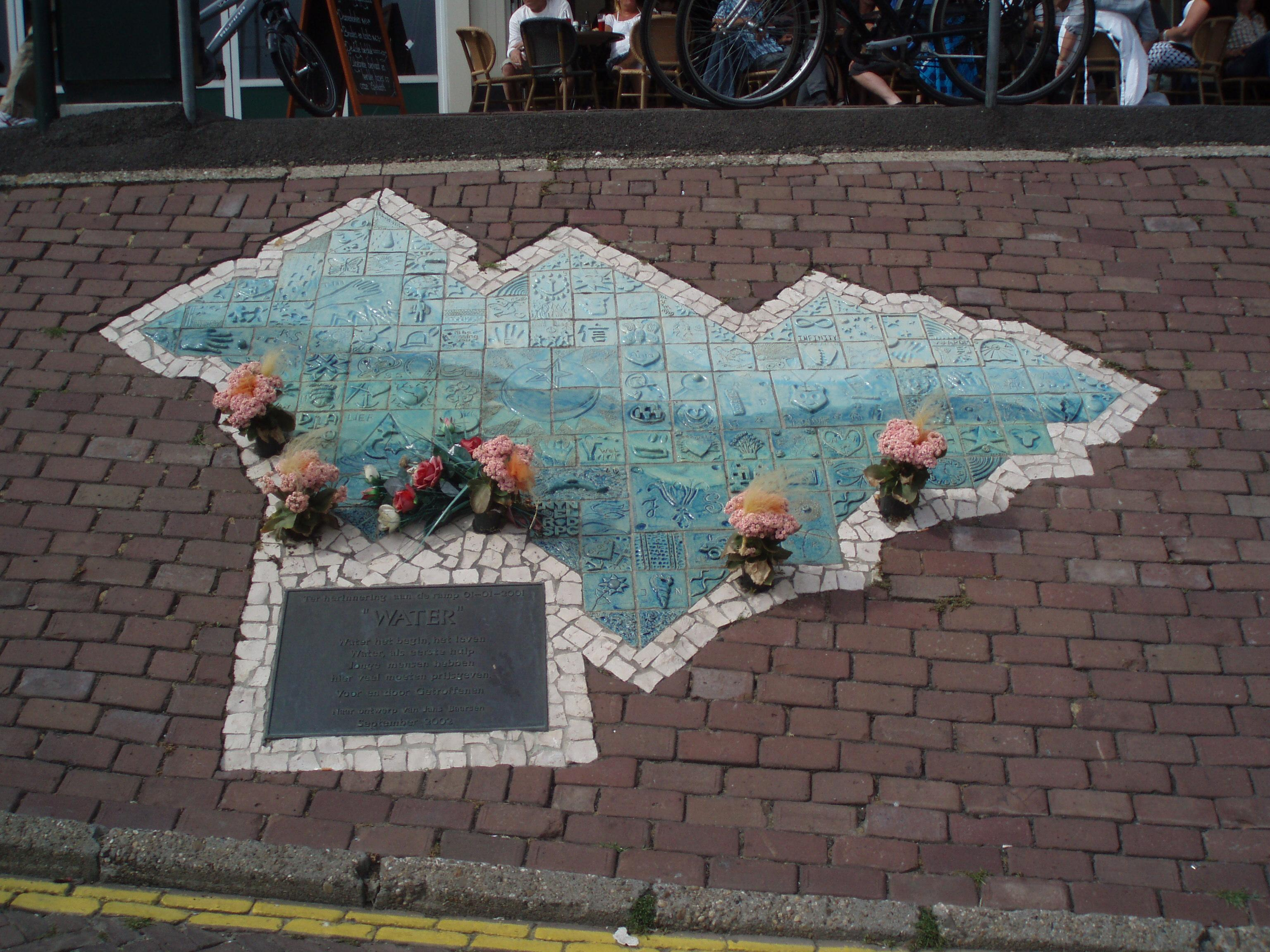
Monument for the victims of the New Year's fire on the Volendam dike, adjacent to the place where the fire happened

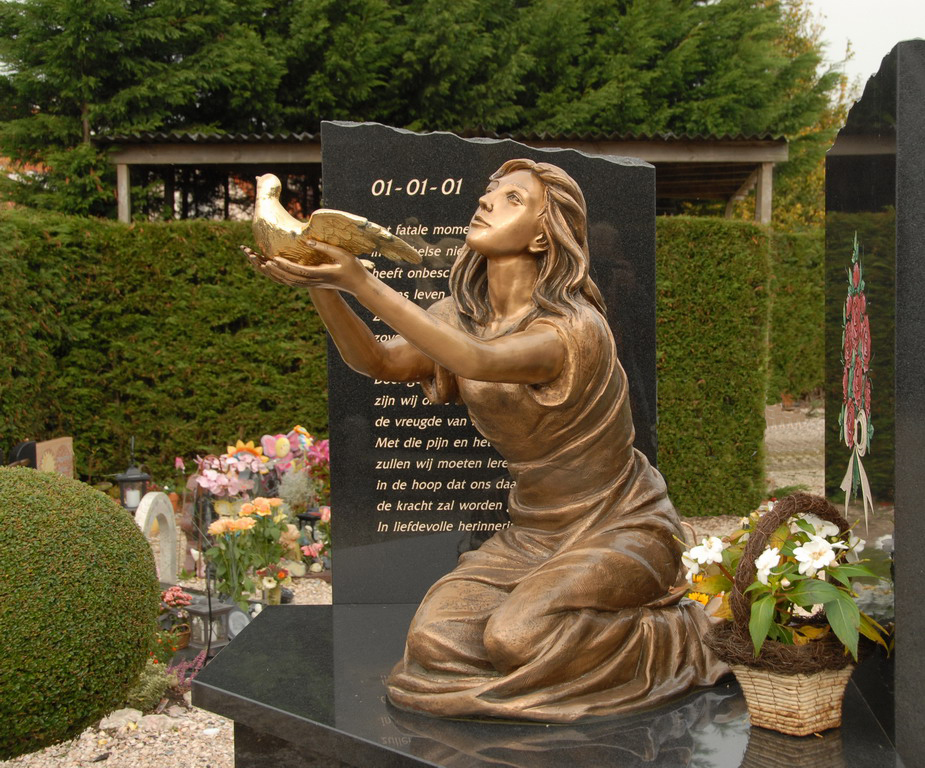
Monument for the victims of the New Year's fire at the graveyard of the Sint-Vincentius church in Volendam

The Volendam New Year's fire was a café fire in the Dutch town of Volendam during the 2000–2001 New Year's night. The fire began early on New Year's Day 2001 and caused the death of 14 people. In all, 241 people were admitted to hospital, 200 of whom suffered serious burns.

== Fire ==
The fire took place in a building that housed three bars. On New Year's Eve, the cafés were packed with more than 350 young people between 13 and 22 years of age when a short blaze happened in the café De Hemel ("Heaven") which was located on the top floor after a sparkler hit Christmas decorations hung from the ceiling. The temperature in the room reached 400 °C (752 °F).

There was great panic and the heat, lack of oxygen and people falling over each other made escaping extremely difficult. There also were bars on the windows and too few emergency exits, all of which contributed to the high number of injuries. Survivors stated that shortly after the fire began all the lights went out contributing to the panic.

The first report reached the Amsterdam ambulance service CPA at 00:38 local time on 1 January. The first fire engine arrived at 00:46 CET. The Dutch Red Cross reported that the alarm was raised shortly after 00:30 local time and that it took 15 minutes for the first ambulances and medical teams to arrive. Mayor Frank IJsselmuiden claimed that the crowd had panicked because all but one of the emergency exits were blocked.

== Victims ==
Initially only eight were reported dead after the fire and the majority of them were from Volendam and aged between 15 and 22. By January 18, four additional people had died in local hospitals raising the official death toll to 12.

Many of those injured were hurt when they smashed windows and leapt from third and second floor windows in an attempt to escape the fire. Others including 53 injured individuals were admitted due to burns with some being flown to special burn units in Belgium and Germany.

== Investigation ==
The fire was investigated intensively by media and politicians. New rules were introduced for decorations in cafés, nightclubs and other venues. The owner and managers of the building were indicted for culpability. An inquiry showed the owner Jan Veerman had been negligent in providing escape routes as well as failing to inundate the Christmas decorations with a fire-resistant substance, and that there were too many people in the building at the time of the incident. The owner was convicted to a conditional prison sentence and community service. As a result of the inquiry Mayor of Edam-Volendam Frank IJsselmuiden and alderman Wim Visscher resigned their positions.

== Aftermath ==
A memorial ceremony for the victims took place in January 2001, with Prime Minister Wim Kok and Crown Prince Willem-Alexander joining about 15,000 other mourners that marched through the town streets. On January 1, 2026 the city of Volendam held a remembrance for the victims and a tilia tree was planted at the location of the fire.

== See also ==
- 2001 in the Netherlands
- List of nightclub fires
- 2026 Crans-Montana bar fire
