= Jeroen Verhoeven =

Dutch footballer

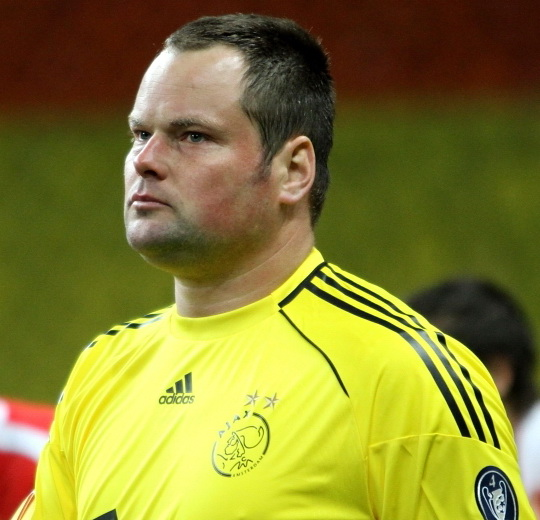
- Verhoeven in 2011

Personal information
- Date of birth: 30 April 1980 (age 46)
- Place of birth: Naarden, Netherlands
- Height: 1.94 m (6 ft 4 in)
- Position: Goalkeeper

Youth career
- BFC
- Ajax

Senior career*
Years	Team	Apps	(Gls)
2000–2002	RKC Waalwijk	0	(0)
2002–2009	FC Volendam	152	(0)
2009–2012	Ajax	3	(0)
2012–2015	FC Utrecht	11	(0)
2015–2016	FC Volendam	4	(0)
2016–2017	ASV De Dijk	38	(0)
Total		208	(0)
- * Club domestic league appearances and goals

Jeroen Verhoeven (Dutch pronunciation: [jəˈruɱ vərˈɦuvə(n)]; born 30 April 1980) is a Dutch former professional footballer who played as a goalkeeper for RKC Waalwijk, FC Volendam, AFC Ajax and FC Utrecht in the span of his 17-year career as a professional goalkeeper in the Netherlands.

== Career ==
Verhoeven started his career in Ajax's youth academy. He played for FC Volendam between 2002 and 2009. In July 2009, Ajax signed the goalkeeper from Volendam on a three-year deal, meaning Verhoeven returned to Amsterdam after seven years. Ajax deployed him as backup for Maarten Stekelenburg and Kenneth Vermeer. He made his debut for Ajax in the Eredivisie on 24 October 2010, coming on as a second-half substitute for the injured Stekelenburg. In this match he helped his team to a 2–2 draw with Excelsior by making three saves in the closing minutes. In the summer of 2012, Verhoeven was released by Ajax and signed a deal with FC Utrecht, where he served as second goalkeeper behind Robbin Ruiter. In August 2015, he signed a one-year deal with former club FC Volendam. He announced his retirement from professional football on 6 May 2016. On 28 November 2017 he announced his retirement from football altogether after an injury plagued season with ASV De Dijk playing in the Dutch Hoofdklasse.

Verhoeven was often teased about his large waistline, which is uncharacteristic for a keeper, by opposing fans. In one match against ADO Den Haag during the 2010–11 season, the home supporters showered him with chants of "Pizza!" when he touched the ball.
