= Gerson Sheotahul =

Dutch-Curaçaoan footballer

Personal information
- Date of birth: 19 April 1987 (age 39)
- Place of birth: Amsterdam, Netherlands
- Height: 1.83 m (6 ft 0 in)
- Position: Striker

Team information
- Current team: IJsselmeervogels
- Number: 11

Youth career
- Ajax

Senior career*
Years	Team	Apps	(Gls)
2006–2009	FC Volendam	44	(8)
2009–2012	Willem II	37	(3)
2011–2012	→ Telstar (loan)	27	(5)
2012	Telstar	6	(0)
2013	Iraklis Psachna	11	(4)
2014	FC Volendam	3	(1)
2015–	IJsselmeervogels	0	(0)
- * Club domestic league appearances and goals as of 9 July 2014

Gerson Sheotahul (born April 19, 1987) is a Dutch-Curaçaoan football player who currently plays for IJsselmeervogels in the Dutch Topklasse.

Born in Amsterdam, he played with the youth teams of Amsterdam amateur sides RKSV DCG and AFC. He made his professional debut for FC Volendam and was signed by Willem II Tilburg in 2009. During the season 2011-12 he was on loan at Telstar. In 2013, he moved to Iraklis Psachna in Greece's Football League.

He is eligible to play for the national teams of Netherlands or Curaçao.

== Honours ==
Volendam

- Eerste Divisie: 2007–08
