= Theo Timmermans (footballer, born 1989) =

Dutch footballer

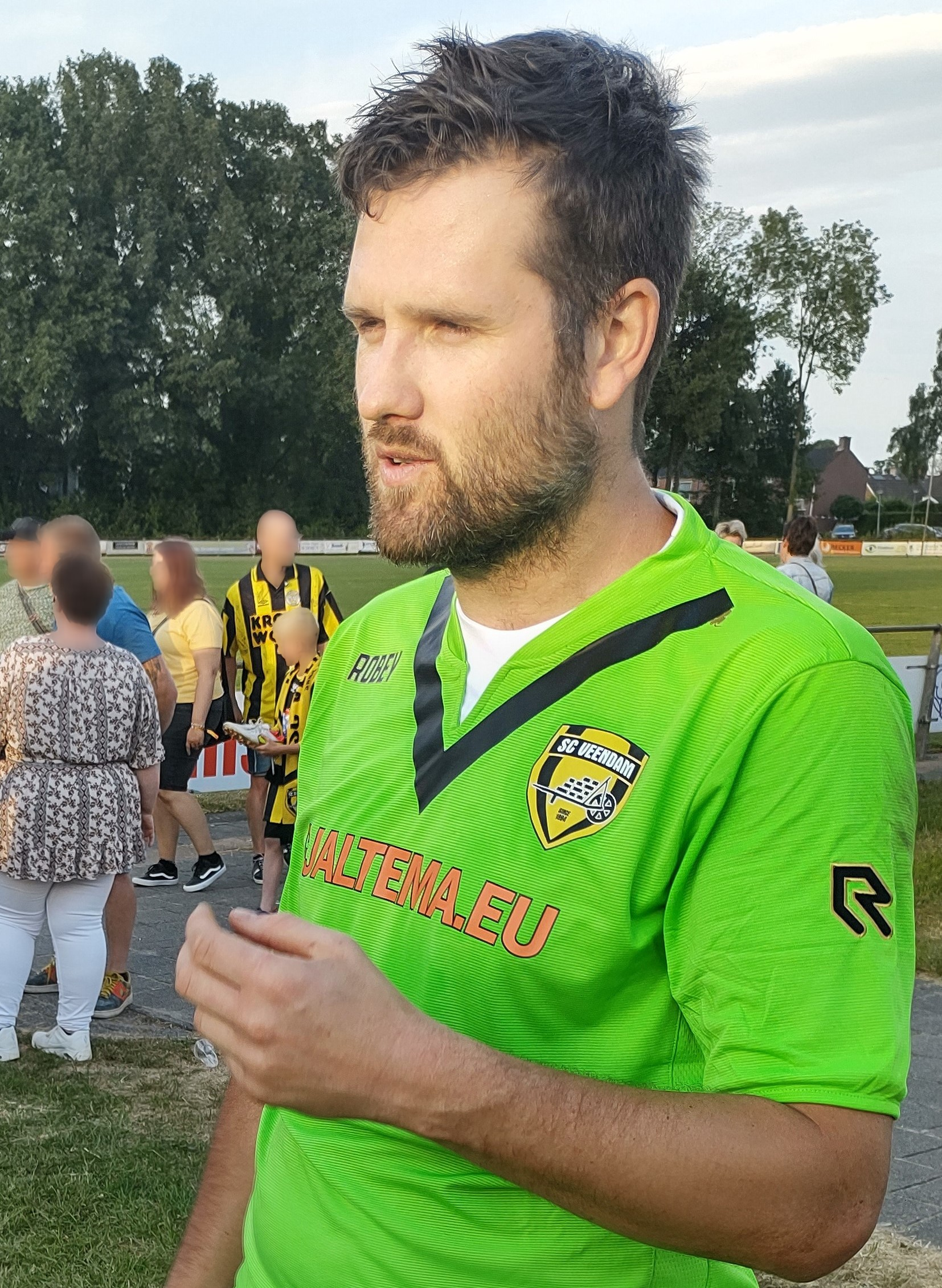

Personal information
- Full name: Theo Timmermans
- Date of birth: 15 September 1989 (age 37)
- Place of birth: Wijnjewoude, Netherlands
- Height: 1.97 m (6 ft 5 1/2 in)
- Position: Goalkeeper

Team information
- Current team: SV Spakenburg
- Number: 13

Youth career
- V en V '68
- BCV
- Drachtster Boys
- FC Groningen
- ONS Sneek

Senior career*
Years	Team	Apps	(Gls)
2010–2011	Harkemase Boys	3	(0)
2011–2012	Sneek Wit Zwart	0	(0)
2012–2013	SC Veendam	23	(0)
2013–2015	FC Volendam	35	(0)
2016–	SV Spakenburg	18	(0)
- * Club domestic league appearances and goals as of 12 April 2017 (UTC)

Theo Timmermans (born 15 September 1989) is a Dutch professional footballer who currently plays as a goalkeeper for SV Spakenburg. He formerly played professional football for SC Veendam and FC Volendam.
