= VVSB =

Dutch football club

- Full name: Voetbal Vereniging Sint Bavo
- Nickname: Bavo
- Founded: 26 October 1931; 95 years ago
- Ground: Sportpark De Boekhorst; Noordwijkerhout, Netherlands
- Capacity: 2,500
- President: Arjan Broekhof
- Manager: Eric Meijers
- League: Derde Divisie
- 2025–26: Derde Divisie B, 3rd of 18
- Website: http://www.vvsb.nl/
Home colours	Away colours

VVSB (Voetbal Vereniging Sint Bavo) is an amateur association football club from Noordwijkerhout, Netherlands. It currently plays in the Derde Divisie.

== History ==
The club was founded on October 26, 1931, and has played exclusively at the amateur level throughout its history. The club competed in the Hoofdklasse league in the 2009–10 season, finishing in fifth place in the Sunday A group and earning promotion to the newly established Topklasse league for the inaugural 2010–11 season through playoffs.

In 2016, VVSB became the first amateur side to qualify for the KNVB Cup Semifinals in 41 years by knocking out FC Den Bosch.

In 2023, VVSB qualified for the Tweede Divisie promotion playoffs.

== Current squad ==
As of 1 February 2019

Note: Flags indicate national team as defined under FIFA eligibility rules; some limited exceptions apply. Players may hold more than one non-FIFA nationality.

No.	Pos.	Nation	Player
1	GK	NED	Ruben Valk
2	DF	NED	Sonny ten Hoope
3	DF	NED	Jordy Zwart (captain)
4	DF	NED	Sven Verlaan
5	DF	NED	Jelmer Vijlbrief
6	MF	NED	Wesley Goeman
7	FW	NED	Lovette Felicia
8	MF	NED	Danny Bakker
9	FW	NED	Guido Pauw
10	MF	NED	Frans van Niel
11	FW	NED	Tommy Bekooij

No.	Pos.	Nation	Player
12	DF	CUW	Richelo Fecunda
14	MF	NED	Tim de Rijk
15	DF	NED	Thomas Arroyo
16	MF	NED	Victor Schipholt
17	FW	NED	Arno Dijkstra
18	FW	NED	Lloyd van der Wilden
19	FW	NED	Lulinho Martins
20	MF	NED	Mitchell Theuns
21	FW	NED	Frank Tervoert
25	GK	NED	Menno de Jong
