= ASV De Dijk =

Association football club in Amsterdam, Netherlands

Coordinates: 52°23′26″N 4°57′20″E

- Full name: Amsterdamse Sport Vereniging De Dijk
- Founded: 1 June 1999; 27 years ago
- Ground: Sportpark Schellingwoude, Amsterdam
- Capacity: 1,500
- Chairman: Julius Egan
- Manager: Kelly Giessen
- League: Tweede Klasse
- 2023–24: Eerste klasse A, 9th of 13 (relegated)
- Website: www.asvdedijk.nl
Home colours

Amsterdamse Sport Vereniging De Dijk is a football club based in the Amsterdam borough of Amsterdam-Noord, in the neighborhood of Schellingwoude. Founded on 1 June 1930 out of a fusion of two clubs, Rood Wit-A and ASV Schellingwoude, they are currently members of the Eerste Klasse, the sixth tier of the Dutch football league system. They play their home matches at Sportpark Schellingwoude.

== History ==
Rood Wit-A were founded on 13 April 1921 as VVA (Voetbal Vereniging Augustinus) joining the Katholieke Voetbalbund (Catholic football union). The name of the club was then changed to RKVVA, following the fusion of the IVCB and the KNVB, in order to tell them apart from VVA who were already competing in the KNVB. In 1957 the club merged with the gymnastics and handball clubs SVA and VDO, as well as the table tennis club KK (Katholieke Kring), becoming an Omni sports club by the name of RKSV Rood Wit Amsterdam.

ASV Schellingwoude were founded on 23 July 1921 as VVS (Voetbal Vereniging Schellingwoude). The club competed in the NHVB at first, before joining the AVB, with both leagues being under the KNVB. A handball team was established as well during the club's 25th anniversary, and the name was subsequently changed to Amsterdamse Sportvereniging Schellingwoude.

On 1 June 1999 the two clubs merged. The new team colors became red-blue-white, with the new name referring to the Schellingwouderdijk upon which the team's ground Sportpark Schellingwoude was built. In 2011 the club's Sunday team won their third consecutive championship, when the team was promoted for three consecutive seasons from the Vierde Klasse to the Eerste Klasse, followed by promotion to the Hoofdklasse. In 2016 they won entry to the Derde Divisie after finishing second.

== Team management ==
ASV De Dijk are the first football club in Amsterdam to have a completely separate Management Column for "Team Development", working exclusively on the team's position in society as a sports club. De Dijk is the first amateur football club to partner with the John Blankenstein Foundation. By partnering with Right to Play the club's youth teams play with the RtP print on the shirt, and a portion of the proceeds are donated to the cause of their charity.

Through active collaborative efforts, the team and its sponsors use the partnership as a means to promote team related activities, commonly in the name of teamwork and social responsibility.

== Honours ==
Derde Divisie (Sunday clubs)

2016–17

Eerste Klasse (Sunday clubs)

2012–13

Tweede Klasse (Sunday clubs)

2010–11

Derde Klasse (Sunday clubs)

2009–10

Vierde Klasse (Sunday clubs)

2008–09
