= 2017 Johan Cruyff Shield =

Johan Cruijff Schaal XXII
| Feyenoord | Vitesse |
| 1 | 1 |
- Feyenoord won 4–2 on penalties
- Date: 5 August 2017
- Venue: De Kuip, Rotterdam
- Referee: Danny Makkelie
- Attendance: 47,500

The 2017 Johan Cruyff Shield was the 22nd edition of the Johan Cruyff Shield (Dutch: Johan Cruijff Schaal), an annual Dutch football match played between the winners of the previous season's Eredivisie and KNVB Cup. The match was contested by Feyenoord, champions of the 2016–17 Eredivisie, and Vitesse, winners of the 2016–17 KNVB Cup. It was held at the De Kuip in Rotterdam on 5 August 2017.

Feyenoord won the match 4–2 on penalties, following a 1–1 draw after ninety minutes. It was the first time that the Johan Cruyff Shield was decided by a penalty shoot-out.

For the first time, the Johan Cruyff Shield was played at the stadium of the previous season's Eredivisie winner, instead of the default Amsterdam Arena.

== Match ==
5 August 2017
18:00 CEST

| Feyenoord | 1–1 | Vitesse |
|---|---|---|
| Toornstra 7' | Report | Büttner 58' (pen.) |
Penalties
| Van der Heijden (penalty scored); Boëtius (penalty scored); Toornstra (penalty scored); Jørgensen (penalty scored) | 4–2 | (penalty missed) Matavž; (penalty missed) Rashica; (penalty scored) Foor; (penalty scored) Colkett |

De Kuip, Rotterdam
Attendance: 47,500
Referee: Danny Makkelie

| Feyenoord | Vitesse |

| GK | 25 | (Australia) Brad Jones |
| RB | 17 | (Netherlands) Kevin Diks | (yellow card) 38' | (substituted off) 77' |
| CB | 33 | (Brazil) Eric Botteghin |
| CB | 6 | (Netherlands) Jan-Arie van der Heijden |
| LB | 5 | (Netherlands) Ridgeciano Haps |
| CM | 8 | (Morocco) Karim El Ahmadi (c) | (yellow card) 58' |
| CM | 10 | (Netherlands) Tonny Vilhena |
| CM | 28 | (Netherlands) Jens Toornstra |
| RW | 19 | (Netherlands) Steven Berghuis | | (substituted off) 74' |
| ST | 9 | (Denmark) Nicolai Jørgensen |
| LW | 7 | (Netherlands) Jean-Paul Boëtius |
Substitutes:
| GK | 22 | (Netherlands) Justin Bijlow |
| GK | 30 | (Netherlands) Ramon ten Hove |
| DF | 4 | (Netherlands) Jerry St. Juste |
| DF | 18 | (Netherlands) Miquel Nelom |
| MF | 38 | (Netherlands) Gustavo Hamer |
| MF | 20 | (Peru) Renato Tapia |
| MF | 21 | (Morocco) Sofyan Amrabat | | (substituted on) 77' |
| MF | 36 | (Norway) Emil Hansson |
| FW | 14 | (Turkey) Bilal Başaçıkoğlu | | (substituted on) 74' |
| FW | 29 | (Netherlands) Michiel Kramer |
| FW | 34 | (Netherlands) Dylan Vente |
Manager:
(Netherlands) Giovanni van Bronckhorst

| GK | 22 | (Netherlands) Remko Pasveer |
| RB | 2 | (England) Fankaty Dabo |
| CB | 37 | (Georgia (country)) Guram Kashia (c) |
| CB | 6 | (Netherlands) Arnold Kruiswijk |
| LB | 28 | (Netherlands) Alexander Büttner | | (substituted off) 87' |
| CM | 10 | (Netherlands) Thomas Bruns | (yellow card) 71' | (substituted off) 77' |
| CM | 17 | (South Africa) Thulani Serero |
| AM | 25 | (Netherlands) Navarone Foor |
| RW | 7 | (Kosovo) Milot Rashica |
| CF | 9 | (Slovenia) Tim Matavž |
| LW | 11 | (Netherlands) Bryan Linssen | (yellow card) 29' |
Substitutions:
| GK | 21 | (Denmark) Michael Tørnes |
| GK | 24 | (Netherlands) Jeroen Houwen |
| DF | 3 | (Netherlands) Maikel van der Werff |
| DF | 5 | (United States) Matt Miazga |
| DF | 29 | (Netherlands) Julian Lelieveld |
| DF | 43 | (Netherlands) Lassana Faye | | (substituted on) 87' |
| MF | 8 | (England) Charlie Colkett | | (substituted on) 77' |
| MF | 19 | (England) Mason Mount |
| MF | 23 | (England) Mukhtar Ali |
| FW | 16 | (Netherlands) Mitchell van Bergen |
| FW | 47 | (Netherlands) Lars ten Teije |
Manager:
(Netherlands) Henk Fraser

Match officials:

- Assistant referees:
  - Mario Diks
  - Hessel Steegstra
- Fourth official: Jochem Kamphuis
- Video-assistant referees:
  - Pol van Boekel
  - Siemen Mulder

Match rules

- 90 minutes
- Penalty shoot-out if scores still level
- Maximum of twelve substitutes, of which three may be used
