= 2017–18 SBV Vitesse season =

Vitesse
2017–18 season
- Chairman: Bert Roetert
- Manager: Henk Fraser (until 11 April 2018) Edward Sturing (caretaker) (11 April 2018)
- Stadium: GelreDome
- Eredivisie: 6th
- KNVB Cup: First round
- Johan Cruyff Shield: Runners-up
- UEFA Europa League: Group stage
- Top goalscorer: League: Bryan Linssen (15 goals); All: Bryan Linssen (19 goals)
- Highest home attendance: 19,876 vs Ajax (4 March 2018)
- Lowest home attendance: 13,921 vs NAC Breda (12 August 2017)
- Average home league attendance: 16,099
Home colours	Away colours	Third colours

During the 2017–18 season Vitesse participated in the Dutch Eredivisie, KNVB Cup, Johan Cruyff Shield and the UEFA Europa League.

== Players ==
=== Squad details ===
As of 19 May 2018

No.	name.	Pos.	Nat.	Place of birth	Date of birth (age)	Club caps	Club goals	Int. apps	Int. goals	Signed from	Date signed	Fee	Contract End
Goalkeepers
21	Michael Tørnes	GK	(Denmark)	Herlev	8 January 1986 (age 40)	3	0	–	–	OB (Denmark)	27 July 2016	Free	30 June 2018
22	Remko Pasveer	GK	(Netherlands)	Enschede	8 November 1983 (age 43)	34	0	–	–	PSV	5 July 2017	€440,000	30 June 2020
24	Jeroen Houwen	GK	(Netherlands)	Venray	18 February 1996 (age 30)	12	0	–	–	Academy	1 July 2013	Free	30 June 2021
40	Bilal Bayazit	GK	(Netherlands)	Amsterdam	8 April 1999 (age 27)	–	–	–	–	Academy	1 July 2017	Free	30 June 2021
Defenders
2	Fankaty Dabo	RB/LB	(England)	Southwark	11 October 1995 (age 31)	34	0	–	–	Chelsea (England)	1 July 2017	Loan	30 June 2018
3	Maikel van der Werff	CB/RB/LB	(Netherlands)	Hoorn	22 April 1989 (age 37)	64	0	–	–	PEC Zwolle	19 February 2015	Free	30 June 2019
5	Matt Miazga	RB/LB	(United States)	Clifton, New Jersey	19 July 1995 (age 31)	72	5	4	1	Chelsea (England)	28 July 2017	Loan	30 June 2018
6	Arnold Kruiswijk	CB	(Netherlands)	Groningen	2 November 1984 (age 42)	76	1	–	–	Heerenveen	19 May 2014	Free	30 June 2019
8	Vyacheslav Karavayev	RB/LB	(Russia)	Moscow	20 May 1995 (age 31)	15	0	–	–	Sparta Prague (Czech Republic)	31 January 2018	€1.3 million	30 June 2021
28	Alexander Büttner	LB/RB/LM	(Netherlands)	Doetinchem	11 February 1989 (age 37)	157	11	–	–	Dynamo Moscow (Russia)	16 January 2017	Free	30 June 2019
29	Julian Lelieveld	RB/CB	(Netherlands)	Arnhem	24 November 1997 (age 28)	9	0	–	–	Academy	29 July 2015	Free	30 June 2020
37	Guram Kashia (c)	CB/RB	(Georgia (country))	Tbilisi	4 July 1987 (age 39)	292	24	60	1	Dinamo Tbilisi (Georgia (country))	31 August 2010	€300,000	30 June 2020
43	Lassana Faye	LB	(Netherlands)	Rotterdam	15 June 1998 (age 28)	29	0	–	–	Academy	1 January 2016	Free	30 June 2019
44	Boyd Lucassen	RB/LB	(Netherlands)	Doetinchem	1 July 1998 (age 28)	–	–	–	–	Academy	19 November 2017	Free	30 June 2019
50	Thomas Oude Kotte	CB/LB	(Netherlands)	Apeldoorn	20 March 1996 (age 30)	10	0	–	–	Academy	19 April 2016	Free	30 June 2018
51	Gino Bosz	CB/DM	(Netherlands)	Rotterdam	23 April 1993 (age 33)	1	0	–	–	Cambuur	1 August 2017	Free	30 June 2018
Midfielders
7	Roy Beerens	RW/LW	(Netherlands)	Bladel	22 December 1987 (age 38)	16	1	2	0	Reading (England)	31 January 2018	€1 million	30 June 2021
10	Thomas Bruns	AM/CM	(Netherlands)	Wierden	7 January 1992 (age 34)	39	4	–	–	Heracles Almelo	1 July 2017	Free	30 June 2021
11	Bryan Linssen	RW/LW/AM	(Netherlands)	Neeritter	8 October 1990 (age 36)	44	19	–	–	Groningen	3 July 2017	€970,000	30 June 2020
16	Mitchell van Bergen	RW/LW/AM	(Netherlands)	Oss	27 August 1999 (age 27)	33	0	–	–	Academy	17 December 2015	Free	30 June 2020
17	Thulani Serero	CM/AM/DM	(South Africa)	Soweto	11 April 1990 (age 36)	38	2	33	2	Ajax	1 July 2017	Free	30 June 2020
19	Mason Mount	CM/DM/AM	(England)	Portsmouth	10 February 1999 (age 27)	39	14	–	–	Chelsea (England)	24 July 2017	Loan	30 June 2018
23	Mukhtar Ali	DM/CM	(Saudi Arabia)	Mogadishu (Somalia)	30 October 1997 (age 29)	12	0	2	0	Chelsea (England)	17 July 2017	€490,000	30 June 2020
25	Navarone Foor	AM/RW/LW	(Netherlands)	Opheusden	4 February 1992 (age 34)	75	9	–	–	NEC	1 July 2016	Free	30 June 2020
47	Lars ten Teije	LW	(Netherlands)	Apeldoorn	3 April 1998 (age 28)	1	0	–	–	Academy	1 July 2017	Free	30 June 2020
48	Jesse Schuurman	CM/DM	(Netherlands)	Bemmel	11 March 1998 (age 28)	1	0	–	–	Academy	16 January 2018	Free	30 June 2019
Forwards
9	Tim Matavž	ST	(Slovenia)	Šempeter pri Gorici	13 January 1989 (age 37)	41	17	35	10	FC Augsburg (Germany)	1 July 2017	Undisclosed	30 June 2020
14	Luc Castaignos	ST	(Netherlands)	Schiedam	27 September 1992 (age 34)	37	3	–	–	Sporting CP (Portugal)	7 August 2017	Loan	30 June 2018
39	Martijn Berden	ST	(Netherlands)	The Hague	29 September 1997 (age 29)	–	–	–	–	PSV	1 July 2016	Free	30 June 2019
42	Thomas Buitink	ST	(Netherlands)	Nijkerk	14 June 2000 (age 26)	4	0	–	–	Academy	11 February 2018	Free	30 June 2019

== Transfers ==
=== In ===
No.	Pos.	Nat.	Name	Age	EU	Moving from	Type	Transfer window	Ends	Transfer fee	Source
—	MF	(Georgia (country))	Valeri Qazaishvili	24	EU	Legia Warsaw (Poland)	Loan Return	Summer	2018	Free	
10	MF	(Netherlands)	Thomas Bruns	25	EU	Heracles	Transfer	Summer	2021	Free	
17	MF	(South Africa)	Thulani Serero	27	Non-EU	Ajax	Transfer	Summer	2020	Free	
2	DF	(England)	Fankaty Dabo	21	EU	Chelsea (England)	Loan	Summer	2018	Free	
9	FW	(Slovenia)	Tim Matavž	28	EU	FC Augsburg (Germany)	Transfer	Summer	2020	Undisclosed	
11	MF	(Netherlands)	Bryan Linssen	26	EU	Groningen	Transfer	Summer	2020	€970K	
22	GK	(Netherlands)	Remko Pasveer	33	EU	PSV	Transfer	Summer	2020	€440K	
8	MF	(England)	Charlie Colkett	20	EU	Chelsea (England)	Loan	Summer	2018	Free	
23	MF	(England)	Mukhtar Ali	19	EU	Chelsea (England)	Transfer	Summer	2020	€490K	
19	MF	(England)	Mason Mount	18	EU	Chelsea (England)	Loan	Summer	2018	Free	
5	DF	(United States)	Matt Miazga	22	Non-EU	Chelsea (England)	Loan	Summer	2018	Free	
14	FW	(Netherlands)	Luc Castaignos	24	EU	Sporting CP (Portugal)	Loan	Summer	2018	Free	
8	DF	(Russia)	Vyacheslav Karavayev	22	EU	Sparta Prague (Czech Republic)	Transfer	Winter	2021	€1.3M	
7	MF	(Netherlands)	Roy Beerens	30	EU	Reading (England)	Transfer	Winter	2021	€1M	

Total spending: €4.2 million ▼

=== Out ===
No.	Pos.	Nat.	Name	Age	EU	Moving to	Type	Transfer window	Transfer fee	Source
5	DF	(Netherlands)	Kelvin Leerdam	27	EU	Seattle Sounders (United States)	Contract Ended	Summer	Free	
30	MF	(Russia)	Arshak Koryan	22	EU	Lokomotiv Moscow (Russia)	Contract Ended	Summer	Free	
40	GK	(Netherlands)	Wouter Dronkers	24	EU	Boston City FC (United States)	Contract Ended	Summer	Free	
—	MF	(Netherlands)	Ewout Gouw	22	EU	Tubize (Belgium)	Contract Ended	Summer	Free	
—	FW	(Netherlands)	Kai Koreniuk	19	EU	AZ	Contract Ended	Summer	Free	
8	MF	(England)	Mukhtar Ali	19	EU	Chelsea (England)	Loan Return	Summer	Free	
10	MF	(Morocco)	Adnane Tighadouini	24	EU	Málaga (Spain)	Loan Return	Summer	Free	
11	MF	(Brazil)	Nathan	21	Non-EU	Chelsea (England)	Loan Return	Summer	Free	
17	DF	(Netherlands)	Kevin Diks	20	EU	Fiorentina (Italy)	Loan Return	Summer	Free	
19	DF	(United States)	Matt Miazga	21	Non-EU	Chelsea (England)	Loan Return	Summer	Free	
34	MF	(England)	Lewis Baker	22	EU	Chelsea (England)	Loan Return	Summer	Free	
13	FW	(Netherlands)	Ricky van Wolfswinkel	28	EU	Basel (Switzerland)	Transfer	Summer	€3.4M	
18	MF	(Zimbabwe)	Marvelous Nakamba	23	Non-EU	Club Brugge (Belgium)	Transfer	Summer	€2.9M	
—	MF	(Georgia (country))	Valeri Qazaishvili	24	EU	San Jose Earthquakes (United States)	Transfer	Summer	Undisclosed	
9	FW	(China)	Zhang Yuning	20	Non-EU	West Bromwich Albion (England)	Transfer	Summer	€7M	
1	GK	(Curaçao)	Eloy Room	28	EU	PSV	Transfer	Summer	€390K	
20	MF	(Netherlands)	Mohammed Osman	23	EU	Telstar	Contract Terminated	Summer	Free	
7	MF	(Kosovo)	Milot Rashica	21	EU	Werder Bremen (Germany)	Transfer	Winter	€7.9M	
8	MF	(England)	Charlie Colkett	21	EU	Chelsea (England)	Loan Return	Winter	Free	

Total gaining: €21.6 million ▲

Balance

Total: €17.4 million ▲

== Pre-season ==
Following the conclusion of the 2016–17 campaign, Vitesse announced they would play Oostende, Sparta Prague and Reading in July 2017.

1 July 2017 Friendly	Vitesse	0 – 2	FC Oleksandriya	Arnhem, Netherlands
17:00 CET	Van Dijk (yellow card) 77'	Report	61', (yellow card) 71' Tsurikov; 90' Kulish	Stadium: Eendracht Arnhem; Attendance: 700; Referee: Siemen Mulder

8 July 2017 Friendly	Vitesse	1 – 1	Oostende	Driel, Netherlands
16:00 CET	Büttner 54'	Report	60' (pen.) Berrier	Stadium: Sportpark RKSV; Attendance: 1,400; Referee: Jochem Kamphuis

15 July 2017 Friendly	İstanbul Başakşehir	1 – 1	Vitesse	Föderlach, Austria
16:00 CET	Cikalleshi 80'	Report	72' Ten Teije	Stadium: SV Wernberg

20 July 2017 Friendly	Sparta Prague	1 – 1	Vitesse	Prague, Czech Republic
20:00 CET	Šural 61'; Frýdek (yellow card) 66'; Vătăjelu (yellow card) 83'	Report	10' Linssen; (yellow card) 66' Serero; (yellow card) 71' Dabo	Stadium: Generali Arena; Attendance: 7,765; Referee: Radek Příhoda

25 July 2017 Friendly	Vitesse	2 – 1	FC Emmen	Driel, Netherlands
14:30 CET	Matavž 5', 26'; Bruns (yellow card) 79'	Report	42' Peters	Stadium: Sportpark RKSV; Attendance: 1,000; Referee: Ingmar Oostrom

29 July 2017 Friendly	Reading	2 – 3	Vitesse	High Wycombe, England
16:00 CET	Swift 63' (pen.); Popa 71'	Report	14' Linssen; 31', 51', (yellow card) 79' Matavž	Stadium: Adams Park; Attendance: 1,894; Referee: Dean Whitestone

== Competitions ==
=== Overview ===
Competition	Record							
Competition	G	W	D	L	GF	GA	GD	Win %
Eredivisie	34	13	10	11	63	47	+16	38.24
European play-offs	4	4	0	0	12	6	+6	100.00
KNVB Cup	1	0	1	0	0	0	+0	0.00
Johan Cruyff Shield	1	0	1	0	1	1	+0	0.00
UEFA Europa League	6	1	2	3	5	10	−5	16.67
Total	46	18	14	14	81	64	+17	39.13

Updated to match played 19 May 2018
Source: Competitions

=== Johan Cruyff Shield ===
5 August 2017 Final	Feyenoord	1 – 1 (4 – 2 p)	Vitesse	Rotterdam
18:00 CET	Toornstra 7'; Diks (yellow card) 38'; El Ahmadi (yellow card) 57'	Report	(yellow card) 29' Linssen; 58' (pen.) Büttner; (yellow card) 71' Matavž	Stadium: De Kuip; Referee: Danny Makkelie
	Penalties
	van der Heijden (penalty scored); Boëtius (penalty scored); Toornstra (penalty scored); Jørgensen (penalty scored)		(penalty missed) Matavž; (penalty missed) Rashica; (penalty scored) Foor; (penalty scored) Colkett

=== Eredivisie ===
==== League table ====
Pos	Team	Pld	W	D	L	GF	GA	GD	Pts	Qualification or relegation
4	Feyenoord	34	20	6	8	76	39	+37	66	Qualification to Europa League third qualifying round (Note: Feyenoord qualified for the Europa League third qualifying round by winning the 2017–18 KNVB Cup.)
5	Utrecht	34	14	12	8	58	53	+5	54	Qualification to European competition play-offs (Note: Four teams play for a spot in the 2018–19 UEFA Europa League second qualifying round.)
6	Vitesse (O)	34	13	10	11	63	47	+16	49	Qualification to European competition play-offs
7	ADO Den Haag	34	13	8	13	45	53	−8	47	Qualification to European competition play-offs
8	Heerenveen	34	12	10	12	48	53	−5	46	Qualification to European competition play-offs

Source: eredivisie.nl
Rules for classification: 1) Points; 2) Goal difference; 3) Goals scored; 4) Head-to-head points; 5) Head-to-head goal difference; 6) Head-to-head away goals scored; 7) Play-off if relevant for deciding champion, relegation or participating in a European league, otherwise by draw. 8) Penalty shoot-out (only after a play-off)
(O) Play-off winners

==== Results summary ====
Overall								Home						Away					
Pld	W	D	L	GF	GA	GD	Pts	W	D	L	GF	GA	GD	W	D	L	GF	GA	GD
34	13	10	11	63	47	+16	49	7	6	4	35	20	+15	6	4	7	28	27	+1

Last updated: 6 May 2018.
Source: Eredivisie

==== Results by matchday ====
Matchday	1	2	3	4	5	6	7	8	9	10	11	12	13	14	15	16	17	18	19	20	21	22	23	24	25	26	27	28	29	30	31	32	33	34
Ground	H	A	H	A	H	A	H	A	A	H	H	A	H	A	H	A	A	A	H	A	H	A	H	H	A	H	A	H	H	A	H	A	H	A
Result	W	W	L	W	D	W	D	D	W	L	D	L	W	L	D	D	L	W	D	W	W	L	W	L	D	W	L	D	L	L	W	L	W	D
Position	1	1	4	2	5	3	3	4	3	5	5	6	6	7	7	7	8	7	7	6	6	7	7	7	7	6	6	6	7	7	6	7	6	6

Updated to match(es) played on 6 May 2018. Source: Vitesse
A = Away; H = Home; W = Win; D = Draw; L = Loss

==== Matches ====
Win Draw Loss

The fixtures for the 2017–18 season were announced in June 2017.

12 August 2017 1	Vitesse	4 – 1	NAC Breda	Arnhem
20:45 CET	Bruns 2'; Linssen 20'; Matavž 32'; Rashica 77'	Report	(yellow card) 25' Vloet; 69' Ambrose	Stadium: GelreDome; Attendance: 13,921; Referee: Siemen Mulder

18 August 2017 2	Roda JC	1 – 3	Vitesse	Kerkrade
20:00 CET	El Makrini (yellow card) 51'; Pasveer 64' (og.)	Report	40' Matavž; (yellow card) 54', (goal) 69' Bruns; (yellow card) 78' Linssen; 80' Kashia	Stadium: Parkstad Limburg Stadion; Attendance: 12,004; Referee: Jochem Kamphuis

26 August 2017 3	Vitesse	1 – 2	AZ	Arnhem
18:30 CET	Matavž 68'; Miazga (yellow card) 87'	Report	3', 81' Weghorst; (yellow card) 33' Vejinović; (yellow card) 63' Ouwejan; (yellow card) 76' Wuytens	Stadium: GelreDome; Attendance: 15,131; Referee: Kevin Blom

9 September 2017 4	Excelsior	0 – 3	Vitesse	Rotterdam
20:45 CET	Messaoud (yellow card) 55'; De Wijs (yellow card) 90'	Report	45' Castaignos; 53' (pen.) Matavž; (yellow card) 66' Dabo; 74' Linssen	Stadium: Stadion Woudestein; Attendance: 4,100; Referee: Bas Nijhuis

17 September 2017 5	Vitesse	1 – 1	VVV	Arnhem
16:45 CET	Miazga (yellow card) 21'; Matavž 47', (yellow card) 90+1'; Van der Werff (yellow card) 88'; Kashia (yellow card) 89'; Pasveer (yellow card) 90'	Report	(yellow card) 38' Labylle; 90' (pen.) Leemans	Stadium: GelreDome; Attendance: 15,000; Referee: Dennis Higler

24 September 2017 6	Ajax	1 – 2	Vitesse	Amsterdam
14:30 CET	Van de Beek (yellow card) 21'; Viergever 83'; Huntelaar (yellow card) 90+2'	Report	21' Kashia; 45+3' Rashica; (yellow card) 79' Faye; (yellow card) 80' Bruns; (yellow card) 90+2' Castaignos	Stadium: Amsterdam Arena; Attendance: 51,236; Referee: Pol van Boekel

1 October 2017 7	Vitesse	1 – 1	Utrecht	Arnhem
14:30 CET	Büttner (yellow card) 3'; Kashia (yellow card) 56'; Mount 76'	Report	(yellow card) 58' Labyad; (yellow card) 65' Van der Meer; 69' Dessers	Stadium: GelreDome; Attendance: 15,432; Referee: Björn Kuipers

15 October 2017 8	Heracles Almelo	1 –1	Vitesse	Almelo
12:30 CET	Peterson 73'; Van Ooijen (yellow card) 90+2'	Report	87' Linssen; (yellow card) 90+3' Dabo	Stadium: Polman Stadion; Attendance: 11,164; Referee: Allard Lindhout

22 October 2017 9	Heerenveen	0 – 4	Vitesse	Heerenveen
16:45 CET		Report	17' Rashica; 36' Linssen; 50' Foor; 72' Matavž	Stadium: Abe Lenstra Stadion; Attendance: 21,034; Referee: Christiaan Bax

29 October 2017 10	Vitesse	2 – 4	PSV	Arnhem
12:30 CET	Dabo (yellow card) 13'; Locadia 45' (og.); Mount 63'; Büttner (yellow card) 67'; Miazga (yellow card) 72'	Report	(yellow card) 4' Van Ginkel; 18', 59' Lozano; (yellow card) 25' Schwaab; (yellow card) 38' Pereiro; 49', 56' Locadia; (yellow card) 67' Arias	Stadium: GelreDome; Attendance: 18,232; Referee: Serdar Gözübüyük

5 November 2017 11	Vitesse	0 – 0	PEC Zwolle	Arnhem
14:30 CET		Report		Stadium: GelreDome; Attendance: 18,349; Referee: Danny Makkelie

19 November 2017 12	Groningen	4 – 2	Vitesse	Groningen
14:30 CET	Reis (yellow card) 24' (yellow-red card) 83'; Memišević (yellow card) 45+1'; Kane (yellow card) 47'; Dabo 59' (og.); Larsen (yellow card) 61'; Idrissi 65'; Van Nieff (yellow card) 75'; Mahi 78'; Van Weert 82'	Report	32' (og.) Larsen; (yellow card) 37' Foor; 62' (pen.), (yellow card) 86' Matavž; (yellow card) 74' Linssen; (yellow card) 76' Bruns	Stadium: Euroborg; Attendance: 17,263; Referee: Jeroen Manschot

26 November 2017 13	Vitesse	2 – 0	ADO Den Haag	Arnhem
16:45 CET	Miazga 87'; Castaignos (yellow card) 90'; Linssen 90+4'	Report	(yellow card) 51' Immers; (yellow card) 70' (yellow-red card) 71' Ebuehi	Stadium: GelreDome; Attendance: 14,754; Referee: Ed Janssen

2 December 2017 14	Feyenoord	1 – 0	Vitesse	Rotterdam
20:45 CET	Jørgensen 9'; Amrabat (yellow card) 74'	Report	(yellow card) 53' Miazga	Stadium: De Kuip; Attendance: 47,500; Referee: Pol van Boekel

13 December 2017 15	Vitesse	2 – 2	Willem II	Arnhem
18:30 CET	Bruns (yellow card) 11'; Matavž 23'; Linssen 88'	Report	(yellow card) 8' Lachman; 13' Ogbeche; 58' Rienstra	Stadium: GelreDome; Attendance: 15,000; Referee: Serdar Gözübüyük

16 December 2017 16	Twente	1 – 1	Vitesse	Enschede
20:45 CET	Jensen 14'	Report	28', (yellow card) 57' Mount; (yellow card) 52' Lelieveld; (yellow card) 83' Castaignos	Stadium: De Grolsch Veste; Attendance: 23,600; Referee: Jeroen Manschot

23 December 2017 17	PSV	2 – 1	Vitesse	Eindhoven
19:45 CET	Schwaab 43'; Lozano 53'	Report	(yellow card) 17' Miazga; 32' Matavž; (yellow card) 43' Lelieveld; (yellow card) 55' Faye; (yellow card) 80' Bruns	Stadium: Philips Stadion; Attendance: 33,800; Referee: Dennis Higler

16 January 2018 18	Sparta Rotterdam	0 – 1	Vitesse	Rotterdam
20:00 CET	Chabot (yellow card) 74'	Report	64' Mount	Stadium: Sparta Stadion Het Kasteel; Attendance: 10,000; Referee: Danny Makkelie

20 January 2018 19	Vitesse	1 – 1	Heerenveen	Arnhem
20:45 CET	Høegh 13' (og.); Serero (yellow card) 62'	Report	37' Van Amersfoort	Stadium: GelreDome; Attendance: 15,363; Referee: Allard Lindhout

27 January 2018 20	PEC Zwolle	1 – 2	Vitesse	Zwolle
19:45 CET	Namli 58'; Ehizibue (yellow card) 79'	Report	29' Linssen; 75' Mount	Stadium: MAC³PARK Stadion; Attendance: 13,115; Referee: Siemen Mulder

2 February 2018 21	Vitesse	2 – 0	Groningen	Arnhem
20:00 CET	Miazga 6'; Mount 32'; Serero (yellow card) 82'	Report	(yellow card) 71' Van Nieff; (yellow card) 77' Zeefuik	Stadium: GelreDome; Attendance: 14,675; Referee: Reinold Wiedemeijer

8 February 2018 22	ADO Den Haag	1 – 0	Vitesse	The Hague
18:30 CET	Becker 53'; Johnsen (yellow card) 59'; El Khayati (yellow card) 89'	Report	(yellow card) 87' Mount	Stadium: Cars Jeans Stadion; Attendance: 12,303; Referee: Martin van den Kerkhof

11 February 2018 23	Vitesse	3 – 1	Feyenoord	Arnhem
14:30 CET	Bruns (yellow card) 13'; Kashia 43'; Linssen 66', 86'; Buitink (yellow card) 84'	Report	21' Vilhena; (red card) 65' Başaçıkoğlu; (red card) 81' Malacia	Stadium: GelreDome; Attendance: 16,459; Referee: Dennis Higler

17 February 2018 24	Vitesse	1 – 2	Excelsior	Arnhem
18:30 CET	Castaignos 2'; Oude Kotte (yellow card) 81'; Serero (yellow card) 84'; Van der Werff (yellow card) 89'	Report	44' Faik; 66', (yellow card) 75' Van Duinen	Stadium: GelreDome; Attendance: 15,432; Referee: Jeroen Manschot

24 February 2018 25	VVV	2 – 2	Vitesse	Venlo
20:45 CET	Hunte 10'; Thy 24'; Janssen (yellow card) 74'; Seuntjens (yellow card) 82'	Report	29' (og.) Röseler; 48' Mount	Stadium: De Koel; Attendance: 6,168; Referee: Siemen Mulder

4 March 2018 26	Vitesse	3 – 2	Ajax	Arnhem
14:30 CET	Foor 16'; Faye (yellow card) 22'; Linssen 57', 71', (yellow card) 59'; Castaignos (yellow card) 89'	Report	61' Cassierra; (yellow card) 70' Ziyech; 85' De Jong; (yellow card) 90+2' De Ligt	Stadium: GelreDome; Attendance: 19,876; Referee: Björn Kuipers

11 March 2018 27	Utrecht	5 – 1	Vitesse	Utrecht
13:30 CET	Van de Streek (yellow card) 32', (goal) 60'; Janssen 36', (yellow card) 41'; Labyad 44'; Ayoub 74', 77'	Report	(yellow card) 10', (goal) 55' Foor	Stadium: Stadion Galgenwaard; Attendance: 19,607; Referee: Ed Janssen

17 March 2018 28	Vitesse	0 – 0	Heracles Almelo	Arnhem
19:45 CET		Report		Stadium: GelreDome; Attendance: 15,000; Referee: Allard Lindhout

31 March 2018 29	Vitesse	0 – 3	Roda JC	Arnhem
18:30 CET		Report	24', 80' Schahin; 70' Avdijaj	Stadium: GelreDome; Attendance: 16,591; Referee: Dennis Higler

7 April 2018 30	NAC Breda	1 – 0	Vitesse	Breda
18:30 CET	Angeliño 35'	Report	(yellow card) 62' Kashia; (yellow card) 77' Linssen; (yellow card) 84' Castaignos	Stadium: Rat Verlegh Stadion; Attendance: 18,567; Referee: Serdar Gözübüyük

14 April 2018 31	Vitesse	7 – 0	Sparta Rotterdam	Arnhem
19:30 CET	Serero 2'; Beerens 18'; Fischer 29' (og.); Büttner (yellow card) 45+1'; Linssen 59', 82'; Matavž 72'; Bruns 77'	Report	(yellow card) 33' Brogno; (red card) 45+1' Kramer	Stadium: GelreDome; Attendance: 16,345; Referee: Kevin Blom

18 April 2018 32	AZ	4 – 3	Vitesse	Alkmaar
18:30 CET	Weghorst 7'; Jahanbakhsh 12', 45+1', 53'	Report	22' Linssen; 40' Matavž; 66' Mount	Stadium: AFAS Stadion; Attendance: 15,200; Referee: Bas Nijhuis

29 April 2018 33	Vitesse	5 – 0	Twente	Arnhem
14:30 CET	Miazga (yellow card) 27'; Serero 40'; Mount (yellow card) 45+2', (goal) 67'; Matavž 53', 88'; Linssen 71'	Report	(yellow card) 71' Assaidi	Stadium: GelreDome; Attendance: 17,939; Referee: Jochem Kamphuis

6 May 2018 34	Willem II	2 – 2	Vitesse	Tilburg
14:30 CET	Tsimikas 29'; Rienstra 70'	Report	63' Miazga; 83' Matavž	Stadium: Koning Willem II Stadion; Attendance: 11,600; Referee: Siemen Mulder

=== European play-offs ===
Four teams will play for a spot in the 2018–19 UEFA Europa League second qualifying round.

==== Semi-finals ====
9 May 2018 First leg	ADO Den Haag	2 – 5	Vitesse	The Hague
18:30 CET	El Khayati 52' (pen.), 82'; Immers (yellow card) 80'; Duplan (yellow card) 90+5'	Report	14' Matavž; 34', 37', 72', (yellow card) 73' Mount; 44' Linssen	Stadium: Cars Jeans Stadion; Attendance: 11,930; Referee: Danny Makkelie

12 May 2018 Second leg	Vitesse	2 – 1 (7 – 2 agg.)	ADO Den Haag	Arnhem
18:30 CET	Matavž 32'; Mount 53'	Report	55' El Khayati	Stadium: GelreDome; Attendance: 15,000; Referee: Kevin Blom

==== Final ====
15 May 2018 First leg	Vitesse	3 – 2	Utrecht	Arnhem
20:45 CET	Mount 42', (yellow card) 82'; Kashia (yellow card) 54', (goal) 90+1'; Linssen 78', (yellow card) 79'	Report	62' Leeuwin; (yellow card) 77' Strieder; 86' Labyad	Stadium: GelreDome; Attendance: 14,236; Referee: Jochem Kamphuis

19 May 2018 Second leg	Utrecht	1 – 2 (3 – 5 agg.)	Vitesse	Utrecht
20:45 CET	Van der Maarel 46', (yellow card) 52'; Labyad (yellow card) 51'; Janssen (yellow card) 59'; Görtler (yellow card) 77'; Emanuelson (yellow card) 90+5'	Report	18' (og.) Leeuwin; 38', (yellow card) 76' Miazga; (yellow card) 49' Kashia; (yellow card) 64' Castaignos; (yellow card) 66' Bruns	Stadium: Stadion Galgenwaard; Attendance: 21,353; Referee: Bas Nijhuis

=== KNVB Cup ===
20 September 2017 First round	AVV Swift	0 – 0 (a.e.t.) (5–3 p)	Vitesse	Amsterdam
17:00 CET		Report		Stadium: Olympiaplein; Referee: Rob Dieperink
	Penalties
	Christianen (penalty scored); Dinkgreve (penalty scored); Moelee (penalty scored); De Groot (penalty scored); Ruijter (penalty scored)		(penalty missed) Büttner; (penalty scored) Matavž; (penalty scored) Foor; (penalty scored) Colkett

=== UEFA Europa League ===
Vitesse qualified for the group stage of the 2017–18 UEFA Europa League by winning the 2016–17 KNVB Cup.

==== Group stage ====
Pos	Team	Pld	W	D	L	GF	GA	GD	Pts	Qualification	LAZ	NCE	ZUL	VIT
1	(Italy) Lazio	6	4	1	1	12	7	+5	13	Advance to knockout phase	—	1–0	2–0	1–1
2	(France) Nice	6	3	0	3	12	7	+5	9	Advance to knockout phase	1–3	—	3–1	3–0
3	(Belgium) Zulte Waregem	6	2	1	3	8	13	−5	7		3–2	1–5	—	1–1
4	(Netherlands) Vitesse	6	1	2	3	5	10	−5	5		2–3	1–0	0–2	—

Source: UEFA
Rules for classification: Group stage tiebreakers

Win Draw Loss

14 September 2017 1	Vitesse (Netherlands)	2 – 3	(Italy) Lazio	Arnhem, Netherlands
21:05 CET	Matavž 33'; Linssen 57'	Report	(yellow card) 32' Felipe; 51', (yellow card) 70' Parolo; 67' Immobile; (yellow card) 70' De Vrij; 75' Murgia	Stadium: GelreDome; Attendance: 19,867; Referee: Liran Liany (Israel)

28 September 2017 2	Nice (France)	3 – 0	(Netherlands) Vitesse	Nice, France
19:00 CET	Pléa 16', 82'; Balotelli (yellow card) 25'; Saint-Maximin 45'	Report	(yellow card) 31' Serero	Stadium: Allianz Riviera; Attendance: 15,006; Referee: Aleksei Eskov (Russia)

19 October 2017 3	Zulte Waregem (Belgium)	1 – 1	(Netherlands) Vitesse	Waregem, Belgium
20:45 CET	Kashia 23' (og.); Iseka (yellow card) 37'; Derijck (yellow card) 84'	Report	(yellow card) 14' Linssen; 27', (yellow card) 37' Bruns; (yellow card) 37' Miazga; (yellow card) 45+3' Büttner; (yellow card) 59' Serero	Stadium: Regenboogstadion; Attendance: 9,488; Referee: Ivan Bebek (Croatia)

2 November 2017 4	Vitesse (Netherlands)	0 – 2	(Belgium) Zulte Waregem	Arnhem, Netherlands
20:45 CET	Mount (yellow card) 19'; Castaignos (yellow card) 20'; Büttner (yellow card) 34' (yellow-red card) 53'; Matavž (yellow card) 54'; Bruns (yellow card) 66'	Report	3' Baudry; (yellow card) 16' (yellow-red card) 22' Madu; 70' Kaya	Stadium: GelreDome; Attendance: 17,906; Referee: Ievgenii Aranovskyi (Ukraine)

23 November 2017 5	Lazio (Italy)	1 – 1	(Netherlands) Vitesse	Rome, Italy
20:45 CET	Alberto 42'	Report	13' Linssen	Stadium: Stadio Olimpico; Attendance: 8,226; Referee: Ali Palabıyık (Turkey)

7 December 2017 6	Vitesse (Netherlands)	1 – 0	(France) Nice	Arnhem, Netherlands
20:45 CET	Lelieveld (yellow card) 40'; Castaignos 84'	Report	(yellow card) 55' Srarfi; (yellow card) 68' Makengo	Stadium: GelreDome; Attendance: 17,564; Referee: Sandro Schärer (Switzerland)

== Statistics ==
=== Appearances ===
No.	Pos.	Name	Eredivisie		KNVB Cup		Johan Cruyff Shield		Europa League		European Play-offs		Total		Discipline	
No.	Pos.	Name	Apps	Goals	Apps	Goals	Apps	Goals	Apps	Goals	Apps	Goals	Apps	Goals	Yellow card	Red card
2	DF	(England) Fankaty Dabo	24 (2)	0	1	0	1	0	4 (1)	0	0 (1)	0	30 (4)	0	3	0
3	DF	(Netherlands) Maikel van der Werff	6 (6)	0	1	0	0	0	1	0	0 (2)	0	8 (8)	0	2	0
5	DF	(United States) Matt Miazga	29 (3)	3	1	0	0	0	6	0	4	1	40 (3)	4	8	0
6	DF	(Netherlands) Arnold Kruiswijk	3 (1)	0	0	0	1	0	0	0	0	0	4 (1)	0	0	0
7	MF	(Netherlands) Roy Beerens	11 (1)	1	0	0	0	0	0	0	4	0	15 (1)	1	0	0
8	DF	(Russia) Vyacheslav Karavayev	7 (4)	0	0	0	0	0	0	0	4	0	11 (4)	0	0	0
9	FW	(Slovenia) Tim Matavž	27 (3)	14	0 (1)	0	1	0	4 (1)	1	4	2	36 (5)	17	3	0
10	MF	(Netherlands) Thomas Bruns	21 (8)	3	1	0	1	0	5	1	1 (2)	0	29 (10)	4	10	0
11	MF	(Netherlands) Bryan Linssen	33	15	1	0	1	0	5	2	4	2	44	19	7	0
14	FW	(Netherlands) Luc Castaignos	8 (20)	2	1	0	0	0	3 (2)	1	0 (2)	0	12 (24)	3	7	0
16	MF	(Netherlands) Mitchell van Bergen	3 (7)	0	0 (1)	0	0	0	0 (1)	0	0 (1)	0	3 (10)	0	0	0
17	MF	(South Africa) Thulani Serero	28 (1)	2	0	0	1	0	4	0	4	0	37 (1)	2	5	0
19	MF	(England) Mason Mount	22 (7)	9	1	0	0	0	4 (2)	0	3	5	30 (9)	14	6	0
21	GK	(Denmark) Michael Tørnes	0	0	0	0	0	0	0	0	0	0	0	0	0	0
22	GK	(Netherlands) Remko Pasveer	26	0	1	0	1	0	6	0	0	0	34	0	1	0
23	MF	(Saudi Arabia) Mukhtar Ali	0 (3)	0	0	0	0	0	0 (1)	0	0 (2)	0	0 (6)	0	0	0
24	GK	(Netherlands) Jeroen Houwen	8	0	0	0	0	0	0	0	4	0	12	0	0	0
25	MF	(Netherlands) Navarone Foor	27 (3)	3	1	0	1	0	3 (2)	0	4	0	36 (5)	3	2	0
28	DF	(Netherlands) Alexander Büttner	15 (2)	0	1	0	1	1	4	0	4	0	25 (2)	1	5	1
29	DF	(Netherlands) Julian Lelieveld	3 (1)	0	0 (1)	0	0	0	2	0	0	0	5 (2)	0	3	0
37	DF	(Georgia (country)) Guram Kashia	32	3	0	0	1	0	6	0	4	1	43	4	5	0
39	FW	(Netherlands) Martijn Berden	0	0	0	0	0	0	0	0	0	0	0	0	0	0
40	GK	(Netherlands) Bilal Bayazit	0	0	0	0	0	0	0	0	0	0	0	0	0	0
42	FW	(Netherlands) Thomas Buitink	0 (4)	0	0	0	0	0	0	0	0	0	0 (4)	0	1	0
43	DF	(Netherlands) Lassana Faye	19	0	0	0	0 (1)	0	2 (3)	0	0 (1)	0	21 (5)	0	2	0
44	DF	(Netherlands) Boyd Lucassen	0	0	0	0	0	0	0	0	0	0	0	0	0	0
47	MF	(Netherlands) Lars ten Teije	0 (1)	0	0	0	0	0	0	0	0	0	0 (1)	0	0	0
48	MF	(Netherlands) Jesse Schuurman	0 (1)	0	0	0	0	0	0	0	0	0	0 (1)	0	0	0
50	DF	(Netherlands) Thomas Oude Kotte	3 (4)	0	0	0	0	0	1	0	0	0	4 (4)	0	0	0
51	DF	(Netherlands) Gino Bosz	0	0	0	0	0	0	0	0	0	0	0	0	0	0
Players who left the club in August/January transfer window or on loan
1	GK	(Curaçao) Eloy Room	0	0	0	0	0	0	0	0	0	0	0	0	0	0
20	MF	(Netherlands) Mohammed Osman	0	0	0	0	0	0	0	0	0	0	0	0	0	0
—	MF	(England) Charlie Colkett	1 (5)	0	0 (1)	0	0 (1)	0	1 (2)	0	0	0	2 (9)	0	0	0
—	MF	(Kosovo) Milot Rashica	18 (1)	3	1	0	1	0	5 (1)	0	0	0	25 (2)	3	0	0

Last updated: 19 May 2018.
Source: Vitesse

=== Top scorers ===
The list is sorted by shirt number when total goals are equal.

Rnk	Pos	No.	Player	Eredivisie	KNVB Cup	Johan Cruyff Shield	Europa League	European Playoffs	Total
1	MF	11	(Netherlands) Bryan Linssen	15	0	0	2	2	19
2	FW	9	(Slovenia) Tim Matavž	14	0	0	1	2	17
3	MF	19	(England) Mason Mount	9	0	0	0	5	14
4	DF	5	(United States) Matt Miazga	3	0	0	0	1	4
4	MF	10	(Netherlands) Thomas Bruns	3	0	0	1	0	4
4	DF	37	(Georgia (country)) Guram Kashia	3	0	0	0	1	4
7	FW	14	(Netherlands) Luc Castaignos	2	0	0	1	0	3
7	MF	25	(Netherlands) Navarone Foor	3	0	0	0	0	3
7	MF	—	(Kosovo) Milot Rashica	3	0	0	0	0	3
10	MF	17	(South Africa) Thulani Serero	2	0	0	0	0	2
11	MF	7	(Netherlands) Roy Beerens	1	0	0	0	0	1
11	DF	28	(Netherlands) Alexander Büttner	0	0	1	0	0	1
Own goals				5	0	0	0	1	6
Total				63	0	1	5	12	81

Last updated: 19 May 2018.
Source: Vitesse

=== Clean sheets ===
The list is sorted by shirt number when total appearances are equal.

Rnk	No.	Player	Eredivisie	KNVB Cup	Johan Cruyff Shield	Europa League	European Playoffs	Total
1	22	(Netherlands) Remko Pasveer	6	1	0	1	0	8
2	24	(Netherlands) Jeroen Houwen	3	0	0	0	0	3
Total			9	1	0	1	0	11

Last updated: 19 May 2018.
Source: Vitesse

=== Summary ===
Games played	46 (34 Eredivisie) (1 KNVB Cup) (1 Johan Cruyff Shield) (6 Europa League) (4 Eredivisie European play-offs)
Games won	18 (13 Eredivisie) (1 Europa League) (4 Eredivisie European play-offs)
Games drawn	14 (10 Eredivisie) (1 KNVB Cup) (1 Johan Cruyff Shield) (2 Europa League)
Games lost	14 (11 Eredivisie) (3 Europa League)
Goals scored	81 (63 Eredivisie) (1 Johan Cruyff Shield) (5 Europa League) (12 Eredivisie European play-offs)
Goals conceded	64 (47 Eredivisie) (1 Johan Cruyff Shield) (10 Europa League) (6 Eredivisie European play-offs)
Goal difference	+17 (+16 Eredivisie) (+0 KNVB Cup) (+0 Johan Cruyff Shield) (–5 Europa League) (+6 Eredivisie European play-offs)
Clean sheets	11 (9 Eredivisie) (1 KNVB Cup) (1 Europa League)
Yellow cards	72 (50 Eredivisie) (2 Johan Cruyff Shield) (12 Europa League) (8 Eredivisie European play-offs)
Red cards	1 (1 Europa League)
Most appearances	(Netherlands) Bryan Linssen (44 appearances)
Top scorer	(Netherlands) Bryan Linssen (19 goals)
Winning Percentage	Overall: 18/46 (39.13%)

Last updated: 19 May 2018.
Source: Vitesse
