= Thomas Oude Kotte =

Dutch footballer (born 1996)

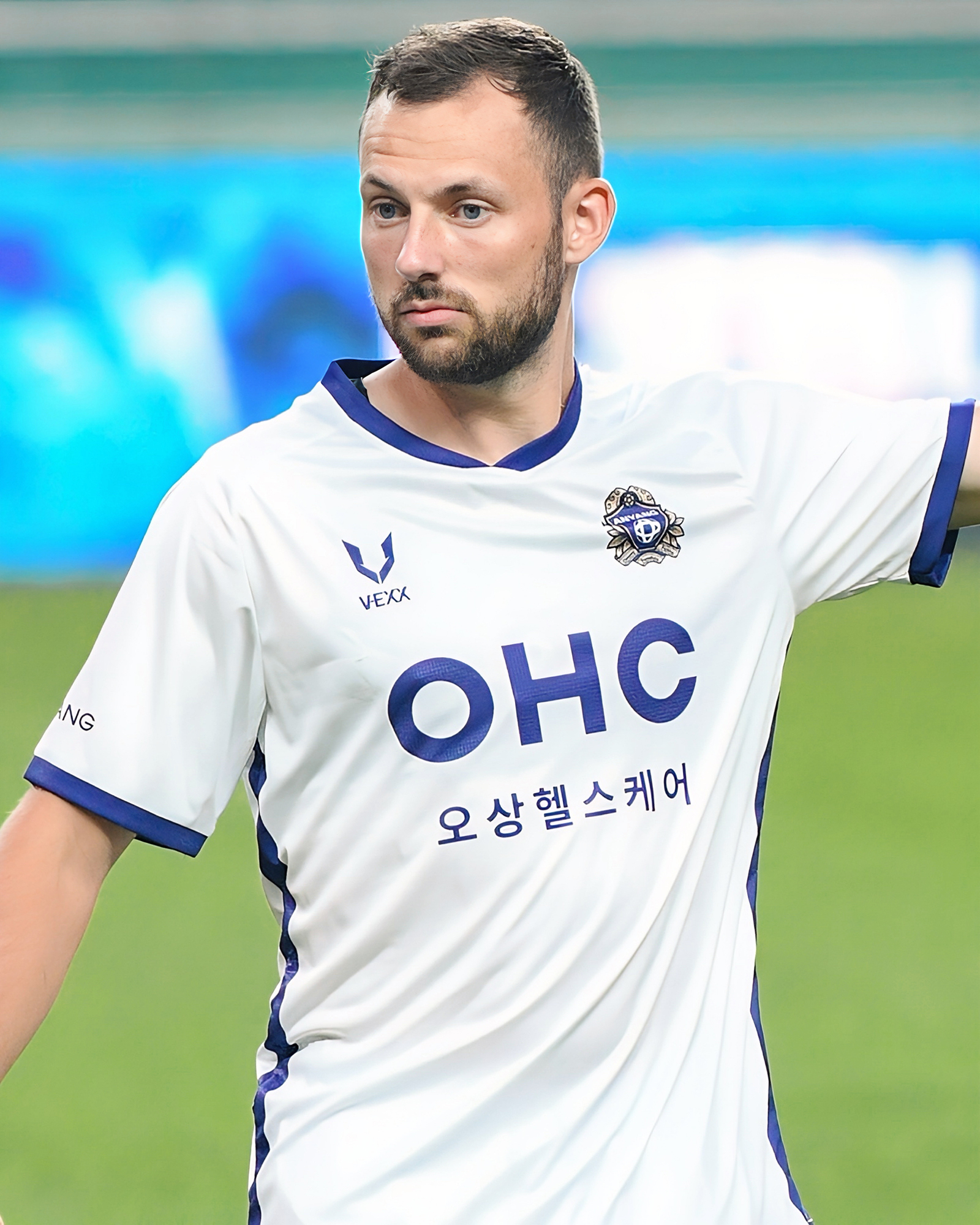
- Oude Kotte in 2025

Personal information
- Date of birth: 20 March 1996 (age 30)
- Place of birth: Apeldoorn, Netherlands
- Height: 1.84 m (6 ft 0 in)
- Position: Centre-back

Team information
- Current team: Ulsan HD FC
- Number: 55

Youth career
- –2008: Groen Wit '62
- 2008–2016: Vitesse

Senior career*
| Years | Team | Apps | (Gls) |
| 2015–2018 | Jong Vitesse | 75 | (6) |
| 2016–2018 | Vitesse | 9 | (0) |
| 2018–2021 | Excelsior | 63 | (2) |
| 2021–2022 | Vendsyssel | 26 | (2) |
| 2022–2024 | Telstar | 64 | (1) |
| 2024–2025 | Roda JC | 20 | (2) |
| 2025–2026 | FC Anyang | 48 | (4) |
| 2026– | Ulsan HD | 4 | (0) |
- * Club domestic league appearances and goals as of 3 August 2026

Thomas Oude Kotte (born 20 March 1996) is a Dutch professional footballer who plays as a centre-back for K League 1 club Ulsan HD.

== Club career ==
=== Vitesse ===
In 2008, Oude Kotte joined Vitesse from local side Groen Wit '62. On 19 April 2016, after impressing at youth level, Oude Kotte made his senior debut against PSV replacing Japanese full-back Kosuke Ota in the 90th minute. On 1 May 2016, Oude Kotte was given his first Vitesse start in a 3–1 defeat against Utrecht, in which he featured for the entirety of the fixture along with Julian Lelieveld.

Ahead of the 2016–17 campaign, Oude Kotte was promoted to the Vitesse first-team along with several other academy teammates including Arshak Koryan, Mitchell van Bergen, Zhang Yuning, Jeroen Houwen and Julian Lelieveld. Along with his promotion, Oude Kotte was reassigned the number 22, after holding the number 44 last season. However, following the arrival of Henk Fraser, Oude Kotte was demoted back to the reserve squad and failed to make a senior appearance all season.

Following several substitute appearances, Oude Kotte made his return to the first-team squad, during Vitesse's 1–0 home victory over French side, Nice in their UEFA Europa League group-stage campaign, featuring for the full 90 minutes. On 29 March 2018, Oude Kotte was offered a new deal, however, opted to reject it to pursue a career abroad and in turn leave in June 2018.

=== Excelsior ===
Despite expressing his desire to move abroad, Oude Kotte opted to join fellow Eredivisie side, Excelsior on a three-year deal in June 2018.

=== Vendsyssel ===
On 23 July 2021, Oude Kotte moved to Denmark, where he signed a two-year deal with Danish 1st Division club Vendsyssel FF. He made his debut for the club on 27 July, starting in a 1–1 away draw against Esbjerg fB. On 7 November, he scored his first goal for Vendsyssel, heading home a corner in the 57th minute, in a 4–1 victory against HB Køge. A year later, in June 2022, Vendsyssel announced the departure of Oude Kotte. He scored twice in 27 appearances for the club.

=== Telstar ===
Oude Kotte returned to the Netherlands after one season, signing a one-year contract with Eerste Divisie club Telstar. He made his competitive debut for the club on 8 August 2022, starting in a 1–1 away draw against Jong Ajax on the first matchday of the season. On 10 January 2023, he scored his first goal for Telstar, a consolation goal in a 3–1 KNVB Cup loss to Twente.

=== Roda JC ===
On 13 June 2024, Oude Kotte joined Roda JC on a two-year deal. He made his competitive debut for the club on 12 August, starting in the season's opening fixture under manager Bas Sibum, as Roda suffered a heavy 6–1 defeat to Jong AZ. On 22 November, he scored his first goals for the club, netting two penalties in Roda JC's 3–1 away win over Jong Utrecht. He finished his six-month spell at the club with two goals in 21 competitive appearances.

=== Anyang ===
On 21 January 2025, Oude Kotte signed with recently promoted K League 1 club FC Anyang. He made his competitive debut for the club on 16 February, the first matchday of the season, starting in a 1–0 away win over Ulsan HD.

== Career statistics ==
As of match played 3 August 2026

Appearances and goals by club, season and competition
| Club | Season | League | | | National cup (Note: Includes KNVB Cup, Danish Cup) | | Europe | | Other | | Total | |
| Club | Season | Division | Apps | Goals | Apps | Goals | Apps | Goals | Apps | Goals | Apps | Goals |
|---|---|---|---|---|---|---|---|---|---|---|---|---|
| Jong Vitesse | 2014–15 | Beloften Eredivisie | 1 | 0 | — | | — | | — | | 1 | 0 |
| Jong Vitesse | 2015–16 | Beloften Eredivisie | 16 | 2 | — | | — | | — | | 16 | 2 |
| Jong Vitesse | 2016–17 | Tweede Divisie | 33 | 1 | — | | — | | — | | 33 | 1 |
| Jong Vitesse | 2017–18 | Derde Divisie | 25 | 3 | — | | — | | — | | 25 | 3 |
| Jong Vitesse | Total | | 75 | 6 | — | | — | | — | | 75 | 6 |
| Vitesse | 2015–16 | Eredivisie | 2 | 0 | 0 | 0 | 0 | 0 | — | | 2 | 0 |
| Vitesse | 2016–17 | Eredivisie | 0 | 0 | 0 | 0 | — | | — | | 0 | 0 |
| Vitesse | 2017–18 | Eredivisie | 7 | 0 | 0 | 0 | 1 (Note: Appearances in UEFA Europa League) | 0 | 0 | 0 | 8 | 0 |
| Vitesse | Total | | 9 | 0 | 0 | 0 | 1 | 0 | 0 | 0 | 10 | 0 |
| Excelsior | 2018–19 | Eredivisie | 21 | 0 | 0 | 0 | — | | 2 (Note: Appearances in Eredivisie promotion/relegation playoffs) | 0 | 23 | 0 |
| Excelsior | 2019–20 | Eerste Divisie | 21 | 0 | 2 | 2 | — | | — | | 23 | 2 |
| Excelsior | 2021–22 | Eerste Divisie | 21 | 2 | 2 | 1 | — | | — | | 23 | 3 |
| Excelsior | Total | | 63 | 2 | 4 | 3 | — | | 2 | 0 | 69 | 5 |
| Vendsyssel | 2021–22 | 1st Division | 26 | 2 | 1 | 0 | — | | — | | 27 | 2 |
| Telstar | 2022–23 | Eerste Divisie | 33 | 0 | 1 | 1 | — | | — | | 34 | 1 |
| Telstar | 2023–24 | Eerste Divisie | 31 | 1 | 0 | 0 | — | | — | | 31 | 1 |
| Telstar | Total | | 64 | 1 | 1 | 1 | — | | — | | 65 | 2 |
| Roda JC | 2024–25 | Eerste Divisie | 20 | 2 | 1 | 0 | — | | — | | 21 | 2 |
| FC Anyang | 2025 | K League 1 | 37 | 3 | 0 | 0 | — | | — | | 37 | 3 |
| FC Anyang | 2026 | K League 1 | 11 | 1 | 0 | 0 | — | | — | | 11 | 1 |
| FC Anyang | Total | | 48 | 4 | — | | — | | — | | 48 | 4 |
| Ulsan HD | 2026 | K League 1 | 4 | 0 | 0 | 0 | — | | — | | 4 | 0 |
| Career total | | | 299 | 17 | 7 | 4 | 1 | 0 | 2 | 0 | 309 | 21 |

== Honours ==
Jong Vitesse

- Derde Divisie – Sunday: 2017–18
