= Charlie Colkett =

English footballer (born 1996)

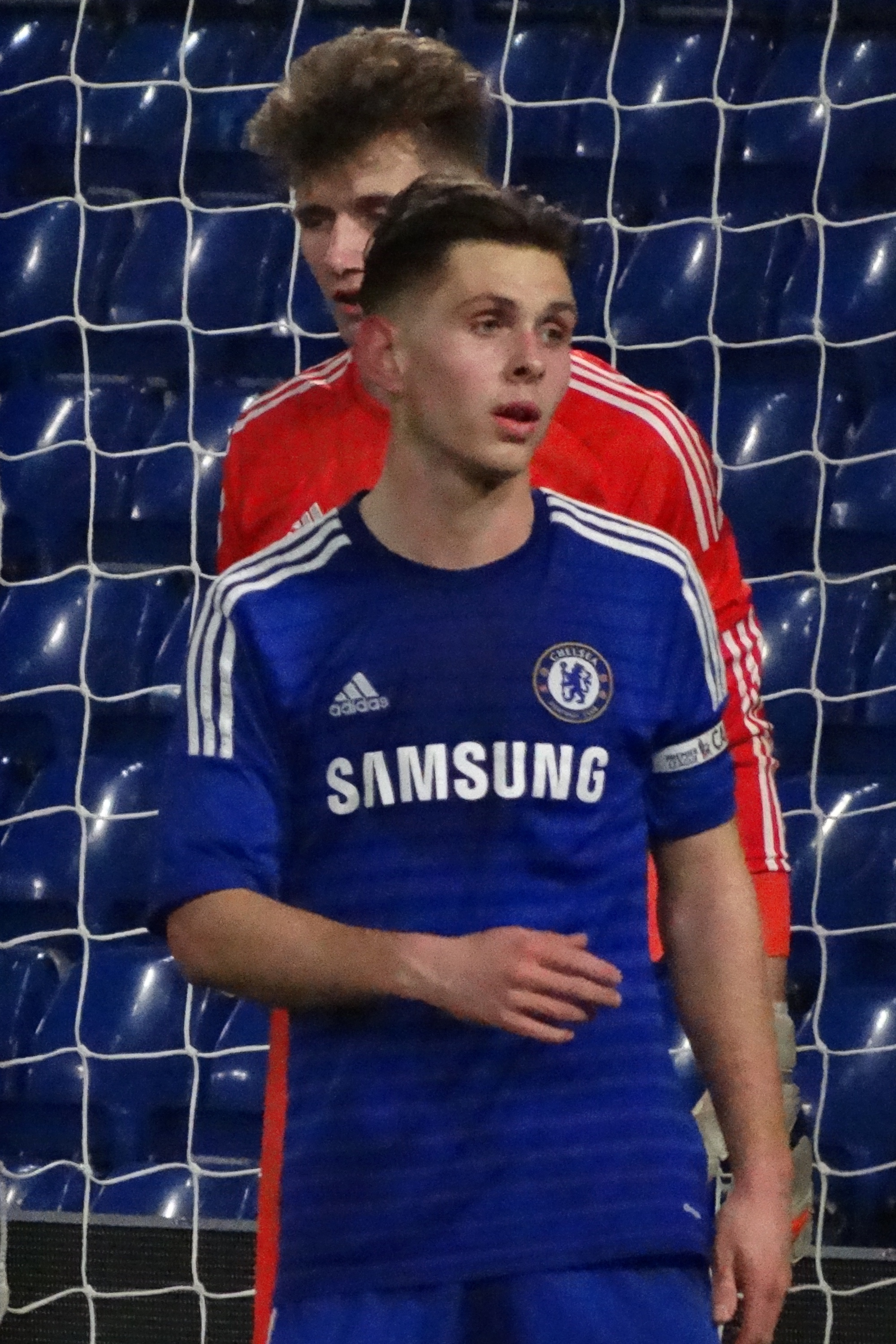
- Colkett playing for Chelsea's youth team in 2015

Personal information
- Full name: Charlie Colkett
- Date of birth: 4 September 1996 (age 30)
- Place of birth: Newham, London, England
- Height: 1.75 m (5 ft 9 in)
- Position: Midfielder

Team information
- Current team: AFC Croydon Athletic

Youth career
- –2007: Charlton Athletic
- 2007–2015: Chelsea

Senior career*
Years	Team	Apps	(Gls)
2015–2019	Chelsea	0	(0)
2016–2017	→ Bristol Rovers (loan)	15	(5)
2017	→ Swindon Town (loan)	20	(1)
2017–2018	→ Vitesse (loan)	10	(1)
2019–2022	Östersund	64	(5)
2022	Cheltenham Town	19	(0)
2022–2024	Crewe Alexandra	15	(1)
2024	→ Notts County (loan)	5	(0)
2024–2025	Gateshead	18	(0)
2025–	AFC Croydon Athletic	12	(0)

International career
2011–2012	England U16	6	(0)
2012–2013	England U17	7	(2)
2014	England U18	1	(0)
2014–2015	England U19	8	(1)
2015–2016	England U20	2	(1)
- * Club domestic league appearances and goals as of 5 September 2025

Charlie Colkett (born 4 September 1996) is an English professional footballer who plays as a midfielder for Isthmian League South East Division club AFC Croydon Athletic.

== Club career ==
=== Chelsea ===
In 2007, Colkett joined Chelsea at the under-11 level from Charlton Athletic and progressed through the club's academy system. He was part of the Chelsea youth side which recorded back-to-back triumphs in both the UEFA Youth League and the FA Youth Cup in 2015 and 2016.

On 9 April 2016, Colkett was named upon the first-team substitute bench along with fellow academy players Ola Aina and Kasey Palmer, in Chelsea's 1–0 away defeat to Swansea City. However, he failed to make an appearance. A couple of weeks later, Colkett went on to sign a new three-year deal, with his current contract due to expire in June 2016.

==== Loan to Bristol Rovers ====
On 31 August 2016, Colkett joined League One side Bristol Rovers on a season-long loan along with teammate Jake Clarke-Salter. On 10 September 2016, Colkett went onto make his professional debut in a 2–2 draw with Rochdale, replacing Hiram Boateng with ten minutes remaining. He scored his first goal for Bristol Rovers which was also his first professional goal, with a late equaliser in a 1–1 draw with Bradford City. On 1 October 2016, Colkett scored the winner in stoppage time to earn a 3–2 win over Northampton Town. Colkett was recalled by Chelsea on 5 January 2017 ending his loan spell with Bristol Rovers with 17 appearances in all competitions and 3 goals.

==== Loan to Swindon Town ====
On 11 January 2017, Colkett joined Swindon Town on loan for the remainder of the 2016–17 campaign. Three days later, Colkett made his Swindon Town debut in their 2–1 victory over Bolton Wanderers, assisting Yaser Kasim's late winner in the 89th minute, before being replaced by Sean Murray with seconds remaining. On 14 March 2017, Colkett scored his first goal for Swindon in their 4–2 home defeat against Sheffield United, netting the hosts opener of the evening from 20-yards out.

==== Loan to Vitesse ====
On 6 July 2017, Colkett joined Vitesse on loan for the 2017–18 campaign. On 5 August 2017, Colkett made his Vitesse debut during their Johan Cruyff Shield tie against Feyenoord, replacing Thomas Bruns in the 1–1 draw, which Feyenoord eventually won on penalties. On 31 January 2018, after only appearing eleven times, including two starts all season, Colkett's loan spell was terminated and he returned to Chelsea.

==== Loan to Shrewsbury Town ====
On 21 July 2018, Colkett joined League One side Shrewsbury Town on loan for the 2018–19 campaign. He started in the season-opening 1–0 home loss to Bradford City but made only five more appearances – all in cups – before Shrewsbury ended his loan prematurely on New Year's Eve.

=== Östersunds FK ===
On 25 January 2019, Colkett signed for Östersund on a 3 1/2-year deal for a "small fee". He scored his first Allsvenskan goal from distance in a 3–2 home win over Falkenbergs FF on 7 April. He terminated his contract with Östersund on 1 January 2022.

=== Cheltenham Town ===
On 18 January 2022, Colkett joined EFL League One side Cheltenham Town on a deal until the end of the 2021–22 season. On 6 May 2022, Colkett was released by the club after not being offered a further contract.

=== Crewe Alexandra ===
In June 2022, Colkett joined League Two side Crewe Alexandra on a free transfer, signing a two-year deal. He made his debut with a substitute appearance in Crewe's second game of the 2022–23 season, a 3–0 win over Harrogate Town at Gresty Road on 6 August 2022. He made his first Crewe start on 9 August 2022, playing in an EFL League Cup first round defeat at Grimsby Town, but suffered a severe hamstring injury sidelining him for at least three months. He made a return in November 2022 and on 1 January 2023 scored his first (only) Crewe goal, the winner in a 1–0 victory over Tranmere Rovers at Gresty Road but limped off after he suffered another hamstring injury ruling him out for several weeks.

==== Loan to Notts County ====
In January 2024, after just six Crewe appearances in the 2023–24 season, Colkett was loaned to Notts County for the remainder of the season.

Colkett was released by Crewe at the end of the 2023–24 season.

=== Gateshead ===
On 20 August 2024, Colkett joined National League club Gateshead on a one-year deal with the option for a further twelve months.

=== AFC Croydon Athletic ===
On 4 September 2025, Colkett joined Isthmian League South East Division club AFC Croydon Athletic.

== International career ==
Colkett has represented England from under-16 level to under-20 level.

== Career statistics ==
As of end of 2024–25 season

Appearances and goals by club, season and competition
Club	Season	League			National Cup		League Cup		Other		Total	
Club	Season	Division	Apps	Goals	Apps	Goals	Apps	Goals	Apps	Goals	Apps	Goals
Chelsea	2016–17	Premier League	0	0	0	0	0	0	0	0	0	0
Chelsea	2017–18	Premier League	0	0	0	0	0	0	0	0	0	0
Chelsea	2018–19	Premier League	0	0	0	0	0	0	0	0	0	0
Chelsea			0	0	0	0	0	0	0	0	0	0
Bristol Rovers (loan)	2016–17	League One	15	3	0	0	0	0	2 (Note: Appearance(s) in EFL Trophy)	0	17	3
Swindon Town (loan)	2016–17	League One	19	1	—		—		—		19	1
Vitesse (loan)	2017–18	Eredivisie	6	0	1	0	—		4 (Note: One appearance in Johan Cruyff Shield, three in UEFA Europa League)	0	11	0
Shrewsbury Town (loan)	2018–19	League One	1	0	1	0	1	0	3	0	6	0
Östersunds FK	2019	Allsvenskan	25	1	0	0	—		—		25	1
Östersunds FK	2020	Allsvenskan	24	0	3	1	—		—		27	1
Östersunds FK	2021	Allsvenskan	15	0	1	0	–		–		16	0
Östersunds FK	Total		64	1	4	1	0	0	0	0	68	2
Cheltenham Town	2021–22	League One	9	0	0	0	0	0	0	0	9	0
Crewe Alexandra	2022–23	League Two	14	1	2	0	1	0	0	0	17	1
Crewe Alexandra	2023–24	League Two	1	0	3	0	0	0	2	0	6	0
Crewe Alexandra	Total		15	1	5	0	1	0	2	0	23	1
Notts County (loan)	2023–24	League Two	3	0	—		—		—		3	0
Gateshead	2024–25	National League	18	0	2	0	—		1 (Note: Appearance(s) in National League Cup)	0	21	0
Career total			151	6	13	1	2	0	12	0	178	7

== Honours ==
Chelsea Reserves

- FA Youth Cup: 2013–14, 2014–15
- UEFA Youth League: 2014–15, 2015–16
