= Jesse Schuurman =

Dutch footballer (born 1998)

Personal information
- Date of birth: 11 March 1998 (age 28)
- Place of birth: Bemmel, Netherlands
- Height: 1.82 m (6 ft 0 in)
- Position: Midfielder

Team information
- Current team: IJsselmeervogels
- Number: 22

Youth career
- –2007: SC Bemmel
- 2007–2015: Vitesse

Senior career*
Years	Team	Apps	(Gls)
2016–2019	Jong Vitesse	71	(15)
2017–2019	Vitesse	1	(0)
2019–2023	De Graafschap	92	(3)
2023	→ Roda JC (loan)	14	(0)
2023–	IJsselmeervogels	104	(17)

International career
2015–2016	Netherlands U18	3	(0)
- * Club domestic league appearances and goals as of 08:38, 25 September 2026 (UTC)

Jesse Schuurman (born 11 March 1998) is a Dutch professional footballer who plays as a midfielder for Tweede Divisie club IJsselmeervogels.

== Club career ==
=== Vitesse ===
Schuurman joined Vitesse in 2007 from boyhood club SC Bemmel and went on to become a prominent figure in their reserve side, first appearing in 2015. He was part of the reserves' title-winning team in 2018, achieving promotion to the Tweede Divisie after a 4–1 win over Blauw Geel '38 on 21 May 2018.

On 29 March 2018, following several matchday squad appearances, Schuurman agreed to a new deal with Vitesse, running until June 2019. On 14 April 2018, Schuurman made his professional debut during his side's 7–0 thrashing of Sparta Rotterdam, replacing Mason Mount in the 88th minute.

=== De Graafschap ===
On 21 June 2019, Schuurman signed a two-year contract with recently relegated Eerste Divisie club De Graafschap. He made his debut for the club as a starter on the first matchday of the 2019–20 campaign, helping his side to a 2–0 victory against Cambuur.

Schuurman made his breakthrough for the club from Doetinchem in his second season at the club, scoring two goals in 39 appearances, including his first professional goal on 11 April 2021 in a 1–0 league win over Go Ahead Eagles.

==== Roda JC (loan) ====
On 30 January 2023, Schuurman was sent on a six-month loan to Roda JC. He made his debut for the club in the local Limburg derby against MVV on 5 February 2023, replacing Sami Ouaissa in the 68th minute of a 2–1 home win. On 19 February, he made his first start for Roda in a loss to his parent club, De Graafschap.

== Career statistics ==
As of match played 19 March 2023

Appearances and goals by club, season and competition
Club	Season	League			KNVB Cup		Europe		Other		Total	
Club	Season	Division	Apps	Goals	Apps	Goals	Apps	Goals	Apps	Goals	Apps	Goals
Jong Vitesse	2015–16	Beloften Eredivisie	7	1	—		—		—		7	1
Jong Vitesse	2016–17	Tweede Divisie	8	0	—		—		—		8	0
Jong Vitesse	2017–18	Derde Divisie	23	6	—		—		—		23	6
Jong Vitesse	2018–19	Tweede Divisie	33	8	—		—		—		33	8
Jong Vitesse	Total		71	15	—		—		—		71	15
Vitesse	2017–18	Eredivisie	1	0	0	0	0	0	0	0	1	0
De Graafschap	2019–20	Eerste Divisie	8	1	1	0	—		—		9	1
De Graafschap	2020–21	Eerste Divisie	36	2	2	0	—		1 (Note: Appearances in Eredivisie promotion/relegation playoffs)	0	39	2
De Graafschap	2021–22	Eerste Divisie	38	1	1	0	—		2	0	41	1
De Graafschap	2022–23	Eerste Divisie	10	0	2	0	—		—		12	0
De Graafschap	Total		92	3	6	0	—		3	0	101	3
Roda JC (loan)	2022–23	Eerste Divisie	8	0	0	0	—		0	0	8	0
Career total			172	18	6	0	0	0	3	0	181	18

== Honours ==
Jong Vitesse

- Derde Divisie: 2017–18
