= 2019–20 SC Heerenveen season =

Season of a Dutch football club

SC Heerenveen
2019–20 season
- Manager: Johnny Jansen
- Stadium: Abe Lenstra Stadion
- Eredivisie: 10th
- KNVB Cup: Quarter-finals
- Average home league attendance: 18,490
Home colours	Away colours	Third colours
- All statistics correct as of 18:11, 27 May 2020 (UTC).

During the 2019–20 season, SC Heerenveen participated in the Eredivisie and the KNVB Cup. Due to the COVID-19 pandemic, the Eredivisie season was abandoned with Heerenveen in 10th place. They were knocked out in the quarter-finals of the KNVB Cup, losing 1–0 at home to Feyenoord.

== Competitions ==
Win Draw Loss

=== Overview ===
Competition	First match	Last match	Starting round	Final position	Record							
Competition	First match	Last match	Starting round	Final position	Pld	W	D	L	GF	GA	GD	Win %
Eredivisie	4 August 2019	7 March 2020	Matchday 1	10th	26	8	9	9	41	41	+0	30.77
KNVB Cup	30 October 2019	13 February 2020	First round	Quarter-finals	4	2	1	1	7	3	+4	50.00
Total					30	10	10	10	48	44	+4	33.33

Last updated: 7 March 2020
Source: Soccerway

=== Eredivisie ===
==== League table ====
Pos	Team	Pld	W	D	L	GF	GA	GD	Pts
8	Heracles Almelo	26	10	6	10	40	34	+6	36
9	FC Groningen	26	10	5	11	27	26	+1	35
10	Heerenveen	26	8	9	9	41	41	0	33
11	Sparta Rotterdam	26	9	6	11	41	45	−4	33
12	FC Emmen	26	9	5	12	32	45	−13	32

Source: eredivisie.nl
Rules for classification: Season in progress: 1) Most points won; 2) Less points lost; 3) Goal difference; 4) Goals scored; 5) Alphabetical order; End of season: 1) Points; 2) Goal difference; 3) Goals scored; 4) Head-to-head points; 5) Head-to-head goal difference; 6) Head-to-head away goals scored; 7) Play-off if relevant for deciding champion, relegation or participating in a European league, otherwise by draw. 8) Penalty shoot-out (only after a play-off)

==== Results summary ====
Overall								Home						Away					
Pld	W	D	L	GF	GA	GD	Pts	W	D	L	GF	GA	GD	W	D	L	GF	GA	GD
26	8	9	9	41	41	0	33	3	8	3	17	18	−1	5	1	6	24	23	+1

Last updated: 7 March 2020.
Source: Eredivisie

==== Results by round ====
Round	1	2	3	4	5	6	7	8	9	10	11	12	13	14	15	16	17	18	19	20	21	22	23	24	25	26	27	28	29	30	31	32	33	34
Ground	A	H	A	H	H	A	H	A	H	A	H	A	H	A	H	A	H	H	A	H	A	H	A	H	A	H	A	H	A	A	H	A	H	A
Result	W	D	L	D	D	L	D	W	W	W	D	D	W	L	W	W	L	D	L	L	L	D	L	D	W	L	C	C	C	C	C	C	C	C
Position	2	4	9	10	9	13	12	11	8	6	8	7	8	7	6	5	7	8	8	9	9	10	10	10	10	10	10	10	10	10	10	10	10	10

Updated to match(es) played on 7 March 2020. Source: Eredivisie
A = Away; H = Home; W = Win; D = Draw; L = Loss

==== Matches ====
The Eredivisie schedule was announced on 14 June 2019. The 2019–20 season was abandoned on 24 April 2020, due to the coronavirus pandemic in the Netherlands.

4 August 2019 1	Heracles Almelo	0–4	SC Heerenveen	Almelo
20:00 CEST (UTC+2)				Stadium: Polman Stadion

11 August 2019 2	SC Heerenveen	1–1	Feyenoord	Heerenveen
14:30 CEST	Drešević 80'		Berghuis 45' (pen.)	Stadium: Abe Lenstra Stadion; Attendance: 18,633; Referee: Jochem Kamphuis

17 August 2019 3	Emmen	2–0	SC Heerenveen	Emmen
20:00 CEST (UTC+2)				Stadium: De Oude Meerdijk

24 August 2019 4	SC Heerenveen	0–0	Twente	Heerenveen
20:45 CEST (UTC+2)		Report		Stadium: Abe Lenstra Stadion; Attendance: 16,328; Referee: Pol van Boekel

31 August 2019 5	SC Heerenveen	1–1	Fortuna Sittard	Heerenveen
18:30 CEST (UTC+2)		Report		Stadium: Abe Lenstra Stadion; Attendance: 15,128; Referee: Edwin van de Graaf

14 September 2019 6	Ajax	4–1	SC Heerenveen	Amsterdam
18:30 CEST	Tadić 14'; Tagliafico (yellow card) 38', (goal) 45+2', 58'; Schuurs 52'		Odgaard 22'; Kongolo (yellow card) 36'	Stadium: Johan Cruyff Arena; Attendance: 52,921; Referee: Allard Lindhout

22 September 2019 7	SC Heerenveen	1–1	Utrecht	Heerenveen
12:15 CEST (UTC+2)		Report		Stadium: Abe Lenstra Stadion

28 September 2019 8	VVV-Venlo	0–3	SC Heerenveen	Venlo
12:15 CEST (UTC+2)				Stadium: De Koel

5 October 2019 9	SC Heerenveen	1–0	PEC Zwolle	Heerenveen
12:15 CEST (UTC+2)				Stadium: Abe Lenstra Stadion

19 October 2019 10	AZ	2–4	SC Heerenveen	The Hague
18:30 CEST (UTC+2)	Vlaar 31'; Stengs 48'	Report	Botman 7'; Kongolo 36'; Odgaard 45+3'; Koopmeiners 63' (o.g.)	Stadium: Cars Jeans Stadion; Attendance: 7,648; Referee: Björn Kuipers

27 October 2019 11	SC Heerenveen	1–1	Groningen	Heerenveen
12:15 CEST (UTC+2)				Stadium: Abe Lenstra Stadion

3 November 2019 12	ADO Den Haag	1–1	SC Heerenveen	The Hague
16:45 CET (UTC+1)		Report		Stadium: Cars Jeans Stadion; Attendance: 12,681; Referee: Sander van der Eijk

9 November 2019 13	SC Heerenveen	2–1	Sparta Rotterdam	Heerenveen
20:15 CET (UTC+1)				Stadium: Abe Lenstra Stadion

24 November 2019 14	PSV	2–1	SC Heerenveen	Eindhoven
14:30 CET (UTC+1)	Bergwijn 17', 36'; Unnerstall (yellow card) 81'	Report	Odgaard 55'; Faik (yellow card) 70'; Drešević (yellow card) 90+2'	Stadium: Philips Stadion; Attendance: 33,800; Referee: Bas Nijhuis

29 November 2019 15	SC Heerenveen	3–2	Vitesse	Heerenveen
20:15 CET (UTC+1)				Stadium: Abe Lenstra Stadion

8 December 2019 16	RKC Waalwijk	1–3	SC Heerenveen	Waalwijk
20:15 CET (UTC+1)				Stadium: Mandemakers Stadion

13 December 2019 17	SC Heerenveen	1–2	Willem II	Heerenveen
20:00 CET (UTC+1)		Report		Stadium: Abe Lenstra Stadion; Attendance: 18,121; Referee: Dennis Higler

21 December 2019 18	SC Heerenveen	1–1	Heracles Almelo	Heerenveen
14:30 CET (UTC+1)				Stadium: Abe Lenstra Stadion

18 January 2020 19	Feyenoord	3–1	SC Heerenveen	Rotterdam
19:45 CET (UTC+1)	Sinisterra 9'; Jørgensen 17', 26'		Veerman 31'	Stadium: De Kuip; Attendance: 46,000; Referee: Siemen Mulder

25 January 2020 20	SC Heerenveen	1–2	AZ	Heerenveen
18:30 CET (UTC+1)	Veerman (yellow card) 28'; Ejuke 69'	Report	De Wit 35'; Boadu 72'; Koopmeiners (yellow card) 76'	Stadium: Abe Lenstra Stadion; Attendance: 19,638; Referee: Kevin Blom

2 February 2020 21	Fortuna Sittard	2–1	SC Heerenveen	Sittard
14:30 CET (UTC+1)	Passlack 15'; Dammers (yellow card) 29'; Ciss (yellow card) 69'; Botman 74' (o.g.); Karjalainen (yellow card) 90+1'	Report	Van Bergen 6'; Van Rhijn (yellow card) 69'; Drešević (yellow card) 90+3'	Stadium: Fortuna Sittard Stadion; Attendance: 8,371; Referee: Ingmar Oostrom

8 February 2020 22	SC Heerenveen	1–1	VVV-Venlo	Heerenveen
18:30 CET (UTC+1)				Stadium: Abe Lenstra Stadion

16 February 2020 23	Vitesse	4–2	SC Heerenveen	Arnhem
18:30 CET (UTC+1)				Stadium: GelreDome

22 February 2020 24	SC Heerenveen	2–2	ADO Den Haag	Heerenveen
19:45 CET (UTC+1)		Report		Stadium: Abe Lenstra Stadion; Attendance: 16,640; Referee: Martin van den Kerkhof

29 February 2020 25	Twente	2–3	SC Heerenveen	Enschede
20:45 CET (UTC+1)	Vučkić 65' (pen.); Selahi 72'	Report	Faik 4'; Ejuke 48'; Veerman 55'; Bednarek (yellow card) 64'	Stadium: De Grolsch Veste; Attendance: 27,000; Referee: Joey Kooij

7 March 2020 26	SC Heerenveen	1–3	Ajax	Heerenveen
20:45 CET	Van Bergen 67'; Kongolo (yellow card) 89'		Timber (yellow card) 12'; Tadić 57', 60'; Promes 63'	Stadium: Abe Lenstra Stadion; Attendance: 29,950; Referee: Jeroen Manschot

14 March 2020 27	Willem II	Cancelled	SC Heerenveen	Tilburg
18:30 CET (UTC+1)				Stadium: Koning Willem II Stadion
Note: Match was initially scheduled for 14 March, but cancelled due to the COVID-19 pandemic in the Netherlands.

21 March 2020 28	SC Heerenveen	Cancelled	RKC Waalwijk	Heerenveen
18:30 CET (UTC+1)				Stadium: Abe Lenstra Stadion
Note: Match was initially scheduled for 21 March, but cancelled due to the COVID-19 pandemic in the Netherlands.

4 April 2020 29	Sparta Rotterdam	Cancelled	SC Heerenveen	Rotterdam
19:45 CEST (UTC+2)				Stadium: Sparta Stadion Het Kasteel
Note: Match was initially scheduled for 4 April, but cancelled due to the COVID-19 pandemic in the Netherlands.

10 April 2020 30	Groningen	Cancelled	SC Heerenveen	Groningen
19:45 CEST (UTC+2)				Stadium: Hitachi Capital Mobility Stadion
Note: Match was initially scheduled for 10 April, but cancelled due to the COVID-19 pandemic in the Netherlands.

22 April 2020 31	SC Heerenveen	Cancelled	Emmen	Heerenveen
19:45 CEST (UTC+2)				Stadium: Abe Lenstra Stadion
Note: Match was initially scheduled for 22 April, but cancelled due to the COVID-19 pandemic in the Netherlands.

25 April 2020 32	PEC Zwolle	Cancelled	SC Heerenveen	Zwolle
19:30 CEST (UTC+2)				Stadium: MAC³PARK Stadion
Note: Match was initially scheduled for 25 April, but cancelled due to the COVID-19 pandemic in the Netherlands.

3 May 2020 33	SC Heerenveen	Cancelled	PSV	Heerenveen
14:30 CEST (UTC+2)				Stadium: Abe Lenstra Stadion
Note: Match was initially scheduled for 3 May, but cancelled due to the COVID-19 pandemic in the Netherlands.

10 May 2020 34	Utrecht	Cancelled	SC Heerenveen	Utrecht
18:30 CEST (UTC+2)				Stadium: Stadion Galgenwaard
Note: Match was initially scheduled for 10 May, but cancelled due to the COVID-19 pandemic in the Netherlands.

=== KNVB Cup ===
30 October 2019 First round	Excelsior Maassluis	0–3	SC Heerenveen	Maassluis
19:45 CET		Report	Ejuke 10'; Bruijn 39'; Høegh 84'	Stadium: Lavendelstraat; Attendance: 1,700; Referee: Clay Ruperti

17 December 2019 Second round	SC Heerenveen	2–0	Roda JC	Heerenveen
19:45 CET	Van Bergen 44'; Veerman 55'	Report		Stadium: Abe Lenstra Stadion; Attendance: 12,339; Referee: Kevin Blom

22 January 2020 Round of 16	SC Heerenveen	2–2 (a.e.t.) (4–3 p)	Willem II	Heerenveen
20:45 CET	Faik 48' (pen.); Dries Saddiki 76' (o.g.)	Report	Pavlidis 20'; Dankerlui 81'	Stadium: Abe Lenstra Stadion; Attendance: 7,102; Referee: Pol van Boekel
	Penalties
	Faik (penalty scored); Drešević (penalty scored); Espejord (penalty missed); Halilović (penalty scored); Ejuke (penalty scored)		(penalty missed) Heerkens; (penalty scored) Ndayishimiye; (penalty scored) Nelom; (penalty missed) Vrousai; (penalty scored) Holmén

13 February 2020 Quarter-finals	SC Heerenveen	0–1	Feyenoord	Heerenveen
20:45 CET		Report	Fer 15'	Stadium: Abe Lenstra Stadion; Attendance: 16,500; Referee: Dennis Higler

== Player Transfers ==
=== Players In ===
Date	Position	Player	From	Type	Fee	Ref.
1 July 2019	MF	(Netherlands) Hicham Faik	(Belgium) Zulte Waregem	Transfer	Undisclosed	
1 July 2019	FW	(Denmark) Jens Odgaard	(Italy) Sassuolo Calcio	Loan	Season Loan	
1 July 2019	FW	(Nigeria) Chidera Ejuke	(Norway) Vålerenga	Transfer	Undisclosed	
1 July 2019	DF	(Netherlands) Ricardo van Rhijn	(Netherlands) AZ Alkmaar	Transfer	Free	
27 July 2019	DF	(Netherlands) Sven Botman	(Netherlands) AFC Ajax	Loan	Season Loan	
23 August 2019	MF	(Denmark) Anders Dreyer	(England) Brighton & Hove Albion	Loan	Half season	
30 August 2019	MF	(Netherlands) Joey Veerman	(Netherlands) FC Volendam	Transfer	Undisclosed	
2 September 2019	DF	(Vietnam) Đoàn Văn Hậu	(Vietnam) Hanoi FC	Loan	Season Loan	
3 September 2019	MF	(Croatia) Alen Halilović	(Italy) A.C. Milan	Loan	Season Loan	
20 December 2019	FW	(Norway) Runar Espejord	(Norway) Tromsø IL	Transfer	Undisclosed	

=== Players Out ===
Date	Position	Player	To	Type	Fee	Ref.
1 July 2019	DF	(Netherlands) Stijn Schaars	N/A	Retired	N/A	
1 July 2019	MF	(Norway) Morten Thorsby	(Italy) Sampdoria	Transfer	Free	
1 July 2019	MF	(Netherlands) Pelle van Amersfoort	(Poland) Cracovia	Transfer	Free	
1 July 2019	GK	(Netherlands) Jan Bekkema	(Germany) SV Straelen	Transfer	Free	
1 July 2019	DF	(Netherlands) Doke Schmidt	Released	Transfer	Free	
1 July 2019	MF	(Japan) Yûki Kobayashi	Released	Transfer	Free	
1 July 2019	DF	(Netherlands) Kik Pierie	(Netherlands) AFC Ajax	Transfer	Undisclosed	
4 July 2019	DF	(Netherlands) Michel Vlap	(Belgium) Anderlecht	Transfer	Undisclosed	
22 July 2019	FW	(Netherlands) Jizz Hornkamp	(Netherlands) FC Den Bosch	Transfer	Free	
8 August 2019	MF	(Netherlands) Ben Rienstra	(Turkey) Kayserispor	Transfer	Undisclosed	
31 August 2019	DF	(Slovenia) Vanja Drkušić	(Italy) Rende Calcio	Transfer	Free	
17 January 2020	FW	(Serbia) Nemanja Mihajlović	(Poland) Arka Gdynia	Transfer	Undisclosed	
31 January 2020	MF	(Denmark) Emil Frederiksen	(Denmark) SønderjyskE	Loan	End of season	
5 February 2020	DF	(Denmark) Andreas Skovgaard	(Sweden) Örebro SK	Loan	one year	
