= Mitchell van Bergen =

Dutch footballer (born 1999)

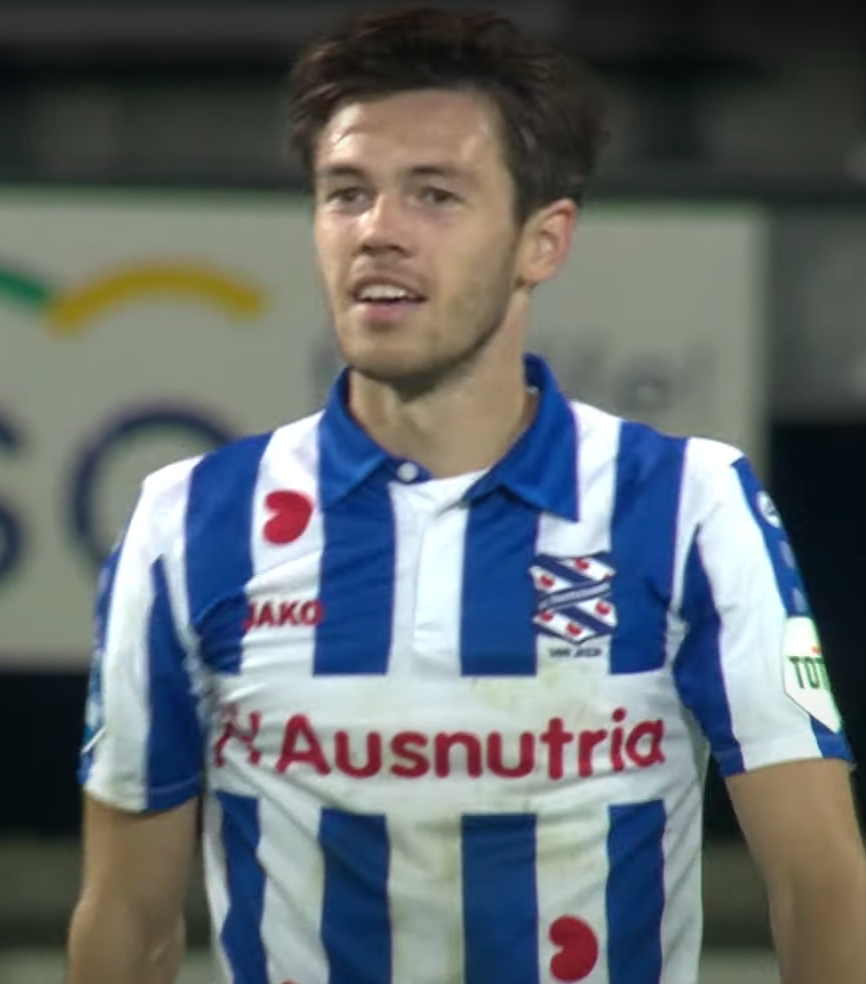
- Van Bergen in 2020

Personal information
- Date of birth: 27 August 1999 (age 27)
- Place of birth: Oss, Netherlands
- Height: 1.70 m (5 ft 7 in)
- Position: Winger

Team information
- Current team: Sparta Rotterdam
- Number: 7

Youth career
- –2007: RKSV Margriet
- 2007–2015: Willem II

Senior career*
Years	Team	Apps	(Gls)
2015–2018	Jong Vitesse	36	(7)
2015–2018	Vitesse	31	(0)
2018–2021	Heerenveen	88	(16)
2021–2023	Reims	48	(0)
2021	Reims II	2	(1)
2023–2025	Twente	36	(0)
2025	→ Sparta Rotterdam (loan)	14	(3)
2025–	Sparta Rotterdam	39	(2)

International career
2015–2016	Netherlands U17	5	(0)
2016	Netherlands U19	6	(0)
2019	Netherlands U21	1	(0)
- * Club domestic league appearances and goals as of 18:04, 21 November 2026 (UTC)

Mitchell van Bergen (born 27 August 1999) is a Dutch professional footballer who plays as a right winger for Eredivisie club Sparta Rotterdam.

== Club career ==
=== Vitesse ===
In July 2015, Van Bergen joined Vitesse on a three–year deal from Eredivisie side Willem II as a fifteen-year old. On 18 December 2015, he made his professional senior debut in a 5–1 victory over Twente coming on as an 83rd-minute substitute for Milot Rashica after impressing in the Vitesse youth sides.

Ahead of the 2016–17 campaign, Van Bergen was promoted to the Vitesse first-team along with several other academy team-mates including Arshak Koryan, Thomas Oude Kotte, Zhang Yuning, Jeroen Houwen and Julian Lelieveld. Along with his promotion, he was reassigned the number 16, after holding the number 42 last season. On 6 August 2016, the opening day of the season, Van Bergen was given his first professional start under new manager Henk Fraser against his former club Willem II, playing 81 minutes before being replaced by debutant Koryan. On 27 January 2017, he signed a new three-and-a-half-year deal with Vitesse until 2020.

=== Heerenveen ===
On 31 August 2018, following limited first-team opportunities at Vitesse, Van Bergen joined fellow Eredivisie side, Heerenveen on a four-year deal for an undisclosed fee. He made his Heerenveen debut on 1 September 2018 replacing Michel Vlap in the 75th minute in a 1–1 draw against VVV-Venlo. He made his first start for the club in a 3–3 draw away at Excelsior playing 66 minutes before being replaced by Jizz Hornkamp. On 8 December 2018, he scored his first goals in the Eredivisie scoring the 4–1 and 5–1 in a 5–1 victory away at Willem II.

=== Reims ===
On 27 August 2021 he joined French club Reims in Ligue 1.

=== Twente ===
On 31 August 2023, Van Bergen signed a four-year contract with Twente. On 31 January 2025, he moved on loan to Sparta Rotterdam until the end of the 2024–25 season.

== International career ==
On 9 September 2015, Van Bergen made his Netherlands U17s debut in a 2–1 defeat against Israels, in which he replaced Ché Nunnely in the 60th minute. Van Bergen made his Netherlands U21s debut on 31 May 2019, in a 5–1 victory over Mexicos, replacing Calvin Stengs in the 61st minute.

== Career statistics ==
As of match played 7 November 2026

Appearances and goals by club, season and competition
Club	Season	League			National cup (Note: Includes KNVB Cup, Coupe de France)		Europe		Other		Total	
Club	Season	Division	Apps	Goals	Apps	Goals	Apps	Goals	Apps	Goals	Apps	Goals
Vitesse	2015–16	Eredivisie	1	0	0	0	0	0	—		1	0
Vitesse	2016–17	Eredivisie	17	0	2	0	—		—		19	0
Vitesse	2017–18	Eredivisie	10	0	1	0	1 (Note: Appearances in UEFA Europa League)	0	1 (Note: Appearances in Eredivisie play-offs)	0	13	0
Vitesse	2018–19	Eredivisie	3	0	0	0	1	0	—		4	0
Vitesse	Total		31	0	3	0	2	0	1	0	37	0
Heerenveen	2018–19	Eredivisie	30	7	3	0	—		—		33	7
Heerenveen	2019–20	Eredivisie	25	5	4	1	—		—		29	6
Heerenveen	2020–21	Eredivisie	32	4	4	0	—		—		36	4
Heerenveen	2021–22	Eredivisie	1	0	0	0	—		—		1	0
Heerenveen	Total		88	16	11	1	0	0	0	0	99	17
Reims	2021–22	Ligue 1	20	0	2	0	—		—		22	0
Reims	2022–23	Ligue 1	28	0	1	0	—		—		29	0
Reims	Total		48	0	3	0	—		—		51	0
Reims II	2021–22	National 2	2	1	—		—		—		2	1
Twente	2023–24	Eredivisie	21	0	1	0	0	0	—		22	0
Twente	2024–25	Eredivisie	15	0	1	0	9 (Note: Two appearances in UEFA Champions League, seven appearances in UEFA Europa League)	0	—		25	0
Twente	Total		36	0	2	0	9	0	—		47	0
Sparta Rotterdam (loan)	2024–25	Eredivisie	14	3	—		—		—		14	3
Sparta Rotterdam	2025–26	Eredivisie	29	2	2	0	—		—		31	2
Sparta Rotterdam	2026–27	Eredivisie	10	0	1	0	—		—		11	0
Sparta Rotterdam	Total		39	2	3	0	0	0	0	0	42	2
Career total			258	22	22	1	11	0	1	0	292	23

== Honours ==
Jong Vitesse

- Derde Divisie – Sunday: 2017–18

Vitesse

- KNVB Cup: 2016–17
