= Julian Lelieveld =

Dutch footballer (born 1997)

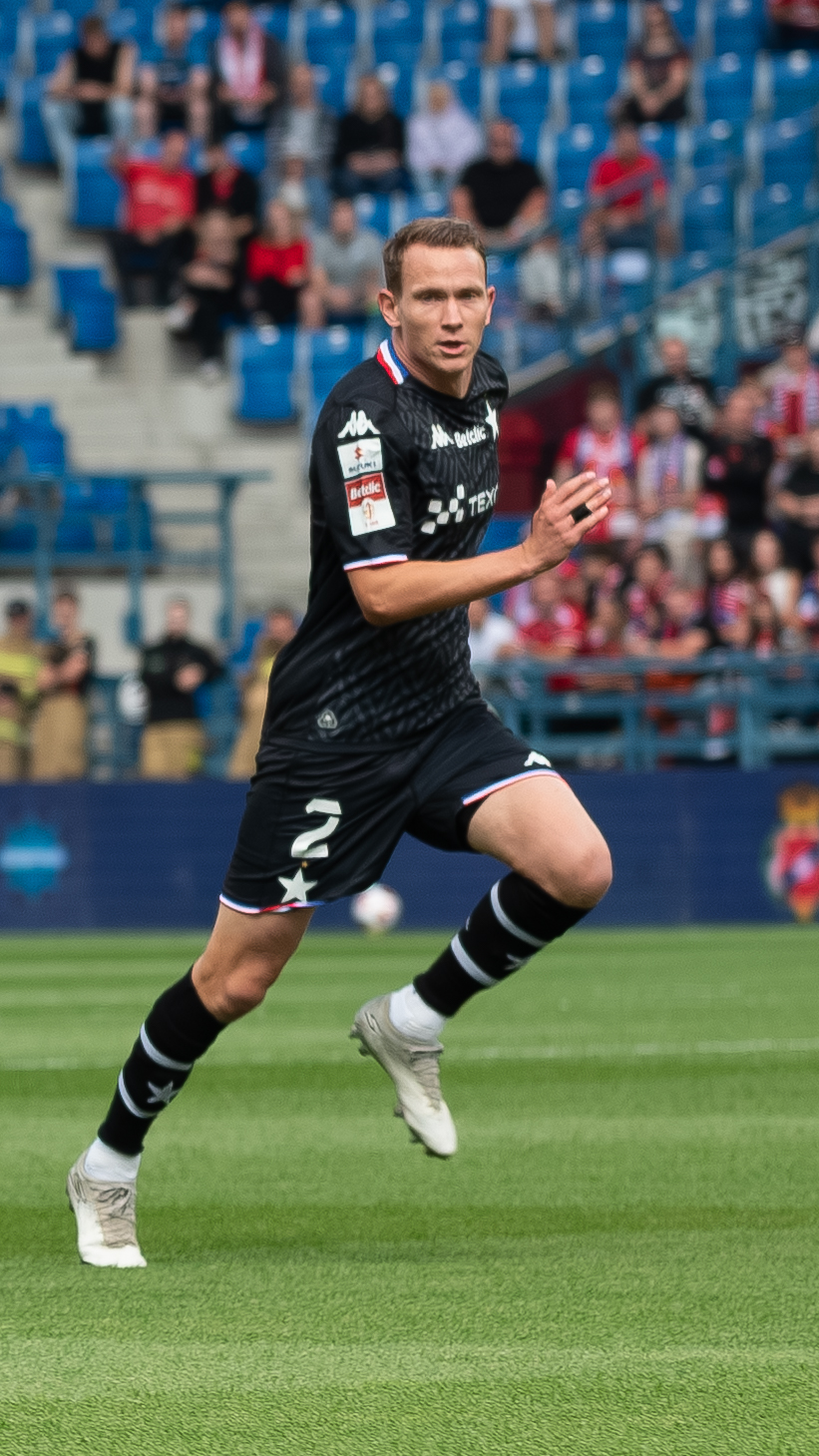
- Lelieveld with Wisła Kraków in 2025

Personal information
- Full name: Julian Ronald Armand Lelieveld
- Date of birth: 24 November 1997 (age 28)
- Place of birth: Arnhem, Netherlands
- Height: 1.78 m (5 ft 10 in)
- Position: Right-back

Team information
- Current team: Wisła Kraków
- Number: 2

Youth career
- 2004–2006: VV Hattem
- 2006–2015: Vitesse

Senior career*
Years	Team	Apps	(Gls)
2014–2018	Jong Vitesse	35	(5)
2016–2020	Vitesse	21	(0)
2018–2019	→ Go Ahead Eagles (loan)	35	(0)
2020–2022	De Graafschap	74	(2)
2022–2025	RKC Waalwijk	97	(2)
2025–	Wisła Kraków	29	(3)

International career
2014–2015	Netherlands U18	7	(0)
2015–2016	Netherlands U19	12	(0)
2016–2018	Netherlands U20	6	(0)
- * Club domestic league appearances and goals as of 13:48, 26 May 2026 (UTC)

Julian Ronald Armand Lelieveld (born 24 November 1997) is a Dutch professional footballer who plays as a right-back for Polish Ekstraklasa club Wisła Kraków.

== Club career ==
=== Vitesse ===
Born in Arnhem, Lelieveld joined Vitesse Arnhem's youth setup in 2005, aged eight, after playing for VV Hattem. He made his professional debut on 30 July 2015, coming on as a late substitute for fellow youth graduate Kevin Diks in a 3–0 away loss against Southampton, for the season's UEFA Europa League. On 1 May 2016, Lelieveld made his league debut in a 3–1 defeat against Utrecht, in which he featured for the entirety of the fixture along with Thomas Oude Kotte.

Ahead of the 2016–17 campaign, Lelieveld was promoted to the first team along with several other academy teammates including Arshak Koryan, Thomas Oude Kotte, Zhang Yuning, Jeroen Houwen and Mitchell van Bergen. Along with his promotion, he was reassigned the number 29, after holding the number 49 last season.

On 25 May 2018, Lelieveld agreed to join Eerste Divisie side Go Ahead Eagles on a season-long loan.

In the summer of 2022, Lelieveld signed a three-year contract with RKC Waalwijk.

On 25 June 2025, Lelieveld moved abroad for the first time and joined Polish second tier club Wisła Kraków on a two-year deal.

== Career statistics ==
As of match played 15 May 2026

Appearances and goals by club, season and competition
Club	Season	League			National cup (Note: Includes KNVB Cup, Polish Cup)		Europe		Other		Total	
Club	Season	Division	Apps	Goals	Apps	Goals	Apps	Goals	Apps	Goals	Apps	Goals
Vitesse	2015–16	Eredivisie	1	0	0	0	1 (Note: Appearance(s) in UEFA Europa League)	0	—		2	0
Vitesse	2016–17	Eredivisie	0	0	0	0	—		—		0	0
Vitesse	2017–18	Eredivisie	4	0	1	0	2	0	0	0	7	0
Vitesse	2018–19	Eredivisie	0	0	0	0	0	0	0	0	0	0
Vitesse	2019–20	Eredivisie	16	0	4	0	—		—		20	0
Vitesse	Total		21	0	5	0	3	0	0	0	29	0
Go Ahead Eagles (loan)	2018–19	Eerste Divisie	35	0	2	0	—		4 (Note: Appearance(s) in Eerste Divisie promotion play-offs)	1	41	1
De Graafschap	2020–21	Eerste Divisie	36	1	2	1	—		—		38	2
De Graafschap	2021–22	Eerste Divisie	38	1	1	0	—		2	0	41	1
De Graafschap	Total		74	2	3	1	—		2	0	79	3
RKC Waalwijk	2022–23	Eredivisie	34	2	0	0	—		—		34	2
RKC Waalwijk	2023–24	Eredivisie	34	0	0	0	—		—		34	0
RKC Waalwijk	2024–25	Eredivisie	29	0	2	0	—		—		31	0
RKC Waalwijk	Total		97	2	2	0	—		—		99	2
Wisła Kraków	2025–26	I liga	29	3	2	0	—		—		31	3
Career total			256	8	14	0	3	0	6	1	279	9

== Honours ==
Jong Vitesse

- Derde Divisie – Sunday: 2017–18

Wisła Kraków

- I liga: 2025–26
