= Lars ten Teije =

Dutch footballer

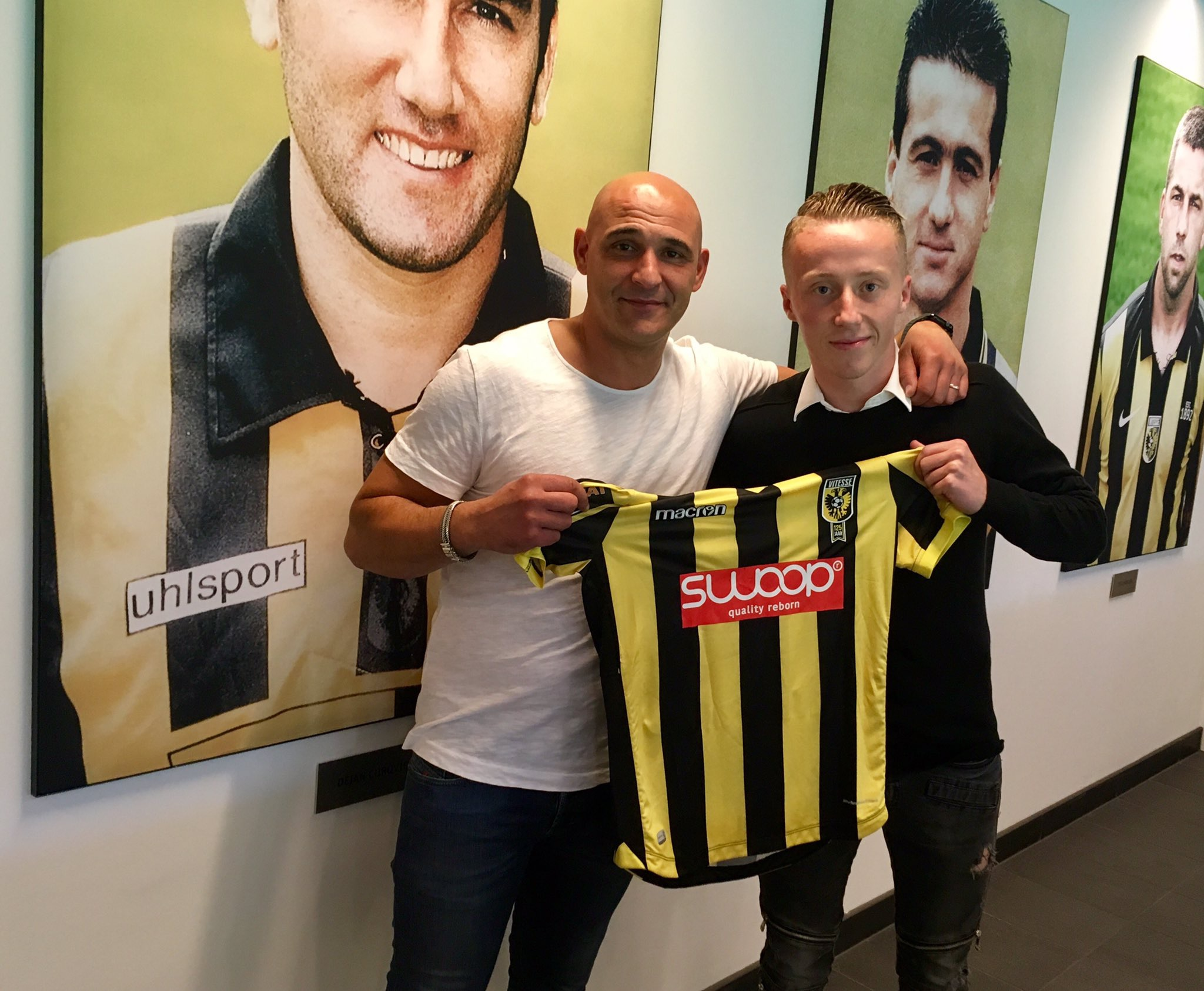

Personal information
- Full name: Lars ten Teije
- Date of birth: 3 April 1998 (age 28)
- Place of birth: Apeldoorn, Netherlands
- Height: 1.82 m (6 ft 0 in)
- Position: Winger

Team information
- Current team: Scherpenzeel
- Number: 11

Youth career
- –2007: Victoria Boys
- 2007–2017: Vitesse

Senior career*
Years	Team	Apps	(Gls)
2016–2019	Jong Vitesse	41	(9)
2017–2019	Vitesse	1	(0)
2020–2022	GVVV	32	(6)
2022–	Scherpenzeel	0	(0)

International career
2016	Netherlands U19	1	(0)
- * Club domestic league appearances and goals as of 11:27, 9 January 2026 (UTC)

Lars ten Teije (born 3 April 1998) is a Dutch professional footballer who plays as a winger for Derde Divisie club Scherpenzeel.

== Club career ==
=== Vitesse ===
Ten Teije first joined Vitesse in 2007, from local side Victoria Boys. After featuring during pre-season, ten Teije was named as unused substitute in Vitesse's Johan Cruyff Shield defeat against Feyenoord. On 8 September 2017, ten Teije signed his first professional contract with Vitesse, agreeing to a three-year deal. A day later, ten Teije made his first-team debut during Vitesse's 3–0 away victory against Excelsior, replacing Tim Matavž in the 83rd minute.

== Career statistics ==
As of match played 9 September 2017.

Club	Season	League			KNVB Cup		Europe		Other		Total	
Club	Season	Division	Apps	Goals	Apps	Goals	Apps	Goals	Apps	Goals	Apps	Goals
Vitesse	2017–18	Eredivisie	1	0	0	0	0	0	0	0	1	0
Career total			1	0	0	0	0	0	0	0	1	0

== Honours ==
Jong Vitesse

- Derde Divisie – Sunday: 2017–18
