= Thulani Serero =

South African soccer player (born 1990)

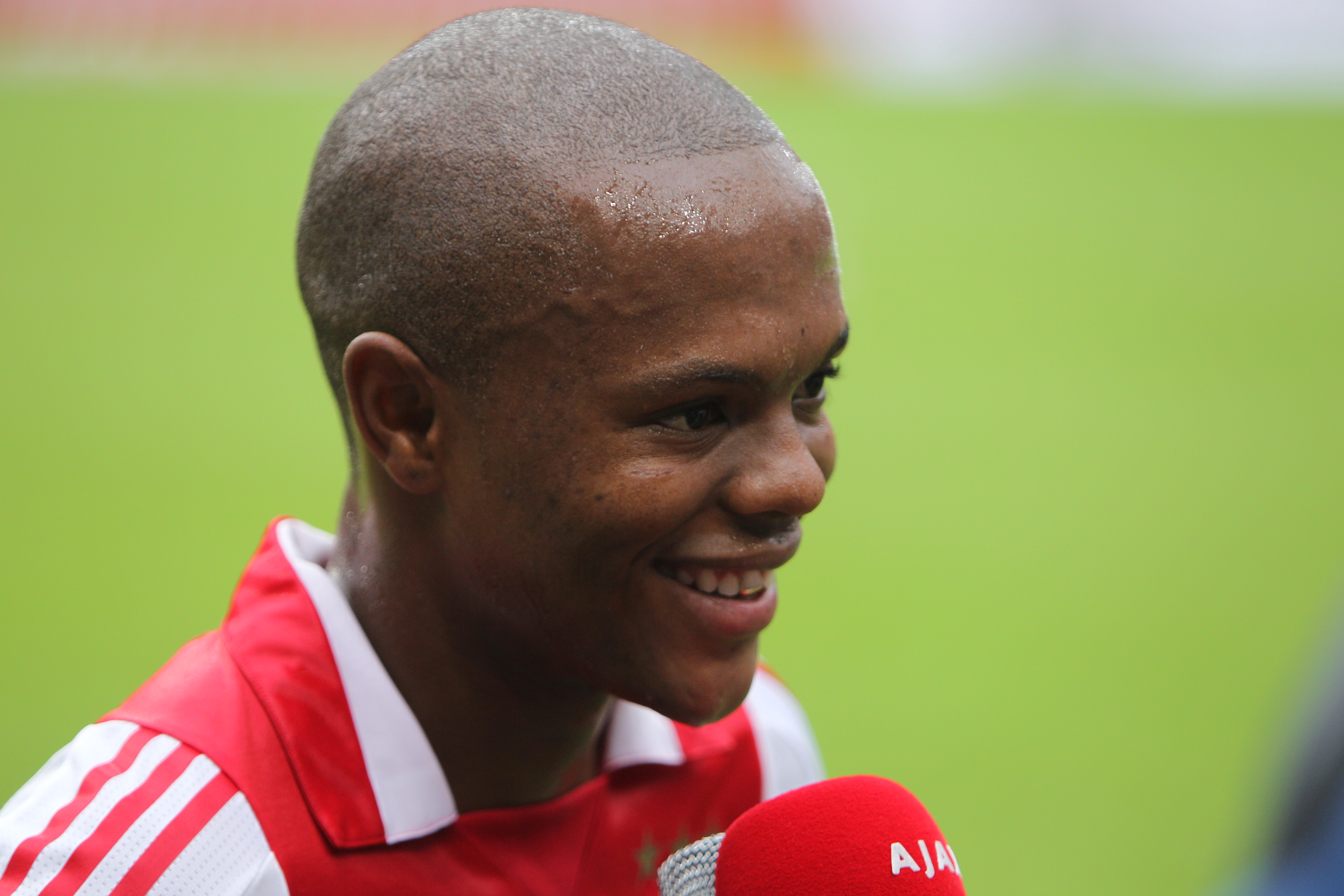
- Serero with Ajax in 2011

Personal information
- Full name: Thulani Caleb Serero
- Date of birth: 11 April 1990 (age 36)
- Place of birth: Soweto, South Africa
- Height: 1.72 m (5 ft 8 in)
- Position: Midfielder

Team information
- Current team: Cape Town City
- Number: 8

Youth career
- 2000–2004: Senaoane Gunners
- 2004–2008: Ajax Cape Town

Senior career*
Years	Team	Apps	(Gls)
2008–2011	Ajax Cape Town	63	(17)
2011–2017	Ajax	88	(8)
2013–2017	Jong Ajax	6	(0)
2017–2019	Vitesse	44	(2)
2019–2023	Al Jazira	90	(0)
2023–2025	Khor Fakkan	21	(1)
2025–	Cape Town City	3	(0)

International career^{‡}
2006–2007	South Africa U17	15	(1)
2008–2009	South Africa U20	14	(1)
2011–	South Africa	41	(1)
- * Club domestic league appearances and goals as of 09:58, 19 July 2024 (UTC) ‡ National team caps and goals as of 15 October 2019

Thulani Caleb Serero (born 11 April 1991) is a South African soccer player who plays as a midfielder for Cape Town City and the South African national team.

He started his career at Ajax Cape Town in the South African Premier Soccer League, before joining Ajax and Vitesse in the Dutch Eredivisie. He later played in the United Arab Emirates for Al Jazira and Khor Fakkan.

== Club career ==
=== Ajax Cape Town ===
Born in Mapetla, Soweto, Serero is a product of the Ajax Cape Town's youth academy having been promoted to the first team in 2008, making his debut under then head coach Craig Rosslee. He made a total of 11 appearances in the regular 2008–09 PSL season, and managed to score four times, helping his side to a 7th-place finish by the end of the season. The following season saw Serero become the first choice playmaker at the Cape club, making a total of 25 appearances during the regular season, and scoring twice. Ajax CT would finish in 7th place again that season, with Serero gaining much attention from the local media for his performances on the pitch.

During the 2010–11 season, under Foppe de Haan, Serero helped the Cape side to a second place regular season finish scoring 11 league goals, and helped his team to reach the finals of the Telkom Knockout tournament. At the end of the season he was awarded a number of accolades, including PSL Footballer of the Year, PSL Player of the Season, PSL Players' Player of the Season and the ABSA Premiership Red Hot Young Player award. On 22 May 2011, he was signed by AFC Ajax for €2.5 million.

=== AFC Ajax ===
Serero had had several trials with parent club AFC Ajax in the preceding years. On 22 May 2011 it was announced that he had signed a four-year contract with Ajax and he stated it was 'a dream come true'. He made his debut for Ajax on 7 August 2011 coming on as a substitute player in the match against De Graafschap. He only played in a total of 6 matches in his first season with Ajax due to an injury. He scored his first goal for AFC Ajax in the home win against NAC Breda on 25 August 2012. Two weeks later he scored two goals against SC Heerenveen, receiving a red card and being sent off in the same match. On 1 September 2013 Serero made his debut in the starting 11 of Ajax, replacing Christian Eriksen who had just left for Tottenham Hotspur, playing in the midfield.

On 5 August 2013, he made his debut in the Eerste Divisie, playing for the reserves team Jong Ajax, who had recently been promoted. The match ended in a 2–0 victory against Telstar. On 26 November 2013, he scored his first international goal for Ajax in the UEFA Champions League, when he scored the opener of a 2–1 win at home against FC Barcelona in the 19th minute.

In March 2015, he was associated with a move to AC Milan. His contract at Ajax was not renewed making him a free agent at the end of June 2017.

=== Vitesse ===
On 14 June 2017, fellow Eredivisie club Vitesse announced the signing of Serero on a three-year deal.

=== Al Jazira ===
In August 2019, Serero joined Emirati club Al Jazira. He contributed to his club's league title in the 2020–21 season, in which he also achieved the Best Foreign Player award.

=== Khor Fakkan ===
On 12 September 2023, Serero signed for fellow Emirati club Khor Fakkan.

== International career ==
Serero has played for the South Africa U-20 team. He earned his first cap for South Africa on 9 February 2011. He came on as a second-half substitute in a friendly against Kenya. He scored his first Bafana Bafana goal against Swaziland in a non-friendly match ahead of the 2010 FIFA World Cup.

He was released from the national team squad due to disciplinary reasons the day before their 2014 World Cup qualification group match against Botswana on 7 September 2013. According to Gordon Igesund, Serero had allegedly stated to the team doctor that he did not want to play in the match in order to avoid risking an injury ahead of an upcoming UEFA Champions League game for his club. Serero disputed these claims, stating that he was genuinely injured and therefore wary about participating in the game.

On 15 November 2014, Serero scored his first goal for the South African senior team in a 2015 Africa Cup of Nations qualification match against Sudan, scoring in the 37th minute of the 2–1 win at home, thus helping his team secure a berth in the final tournament held in Equatorial Guinea the next year.

Having contributed to his team's placement for the final tournament, Serero was cut from the 23-man selection to represent South Africa in the final tournament under head coach Ephraim Mashaba, having been called up for the 34-man provisional squad prior.

He was recalled to the national team in November 2018.

== Career statistics ==
As of match played 20 December 2018.

Club	Season	League			Cup		Continental		Other		Total	
Club	Season	Division	Apps	Goals	Apps	Goals	Apps	Goals	Apps	Goals	Apps	Goals
Ajax Cape Town	2007–08	Premier Soccer League	0	0	0	0	—		—		0	0
Ajax Cape Town	2008–09	Premier Soccer League	10	4	0	0	0	0	—		10	4
Ajax Cape Town	2009–10	Premier Soccer League	25	2	4	1	—		—		29	3
Ajax Cape Town	2010–11	Premier Soccer League	28	10	4	0	—		—		32	10
Ajax Cape Town	Total		63	16	8	1	0	0	—		71	17
Ajax	2011–12	Eredivisie	7	0	1	0	2	0	0	0	10	0
Ajax	2012–13	Eredivisie	9	3	1	0	1	0	0	0	11	3
Ajax	2013–14	Eredivisie	29	3	6	1	5	1	0	0	40	5
Ajax	2014–15	Eredivisie	29	1	2	0	9	0	1	0	41	1
Ajax	2015–16	Eredivisie	14	1	2	0	3	0	—		19	1
Ajax	Total		88	8	12	1	20	1	1	0	121	10
Vitesse	2017–18	Eredivisie	29	2	0	0	4	0	5	0	38	2
Vitesse	2018–19	Eredivisie	15	1	2	0	4	0	—		21	0
Vitesse	Total		44	2	2	0	8	0	5	0	59	2
Career total			195	26	22	2	28	1	6	0	251	29

=== International goals ===
Scores and results list South Africa's goal tally first.

Goal	Date	Venue	Opponent	Score	Result	Competition
1.	15 November 2014	Moses Mabhida Stadium, Durban, South Africa	Sudan	1–0	2–1	2015 Africa Cup of Nations qualification
(Note: On 6 September 2017, the Emergency Bureau for the FIFA World Cup Qualifiers annulled the result of the match between Senegal and South Africa from 12 November 2016 and ordered that it be replayed. Originally South Africa had defeated Senegal 2–1. Match referee Joseph Lamptey was banned for life by the FIFA Disciplinary Committee on 20 March 2017 for "unlawfully influencing" the match after issuing a penalty for handball against Senegal.)	12 November 2016	Peter Mokaba Stadium, Polokwane, South Africa	Senegal	2–0	2–1	2018 FIFA World Cup qualification

== Honours ==
Ajax Cape Town

- MTN 8 runner-up: 2009
- Telkom Knockout runner-up: 2010

Ajax

- Eredivisie: 2011–12, 2012–13, 2013–14
- Johan Cruijff Shield: 2013

Al Jazira

- UAE Pro League: 2020–21

Individual

- PSL Footballer of the Year: 2011
- PSL Player of the Season: 2011
- PSL Players' Player of the Season: 2011
- Absa Premiership Red Hot Young Player in Premier Soccer League: 2011
- SAFA Young Player of the Year: 2009
