= Thomas Bruns =

Dutch footballer (born 1992)

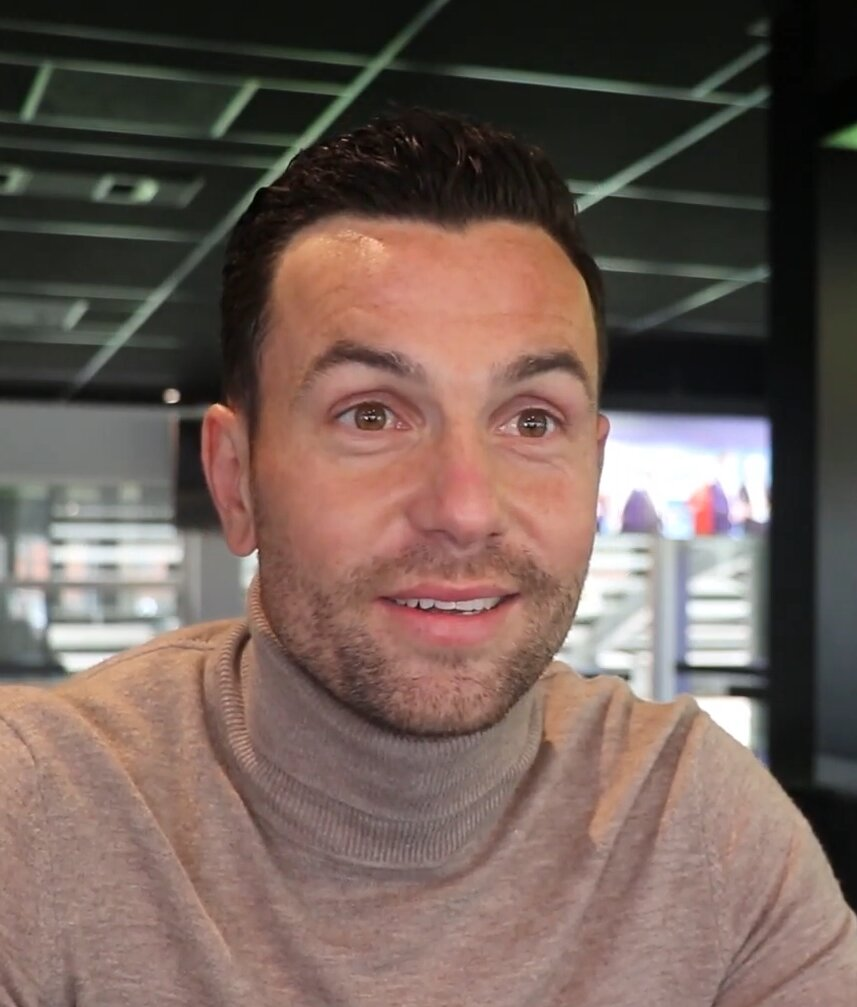
- Bruns in 2020

Personal information
- Date of birth: 7 January 1992 (age 34)
- Place of birth: Wierden, Netherlands
- Height: 1.77 m (5 ft 10 in)
- Position: Midfielder

Team information
- Current team: Heracles
- Number: 10

Youth career
- –2003: SV Omhoog
- 2003–2011: Twente

Senior career*
Years	Team	Apps	(Gls)
2011–2017	Heracles	175	(24)
2017–2021	Vitesse	58	(3)
2019	→ Groningen (loan)	16	(2)
2019–2020	→ PEC Zwolle (loan)	8	(1)
2020	→ VVV-Venlo (loan)	6	(0)
2021–2022	Adanaspor	30	(3)
2022–	Heracles	110	(8)

International career
2008	Netherlands U16	1	(1)
2008–2009	Netherlands U17	7	(1)
2012	Netherlands U20	2	(0)
2013	Netherlands U21	3	(0)
- * Club domestic league appearances and goals as of 21 May 2026

Thomas Bruns (born 7 January 1992) is a Dutch professional footballer who plays as a midfielder for Eerste Divisie club Heracles Almelo.

== Club career ==
=== Heracles Almelo ===
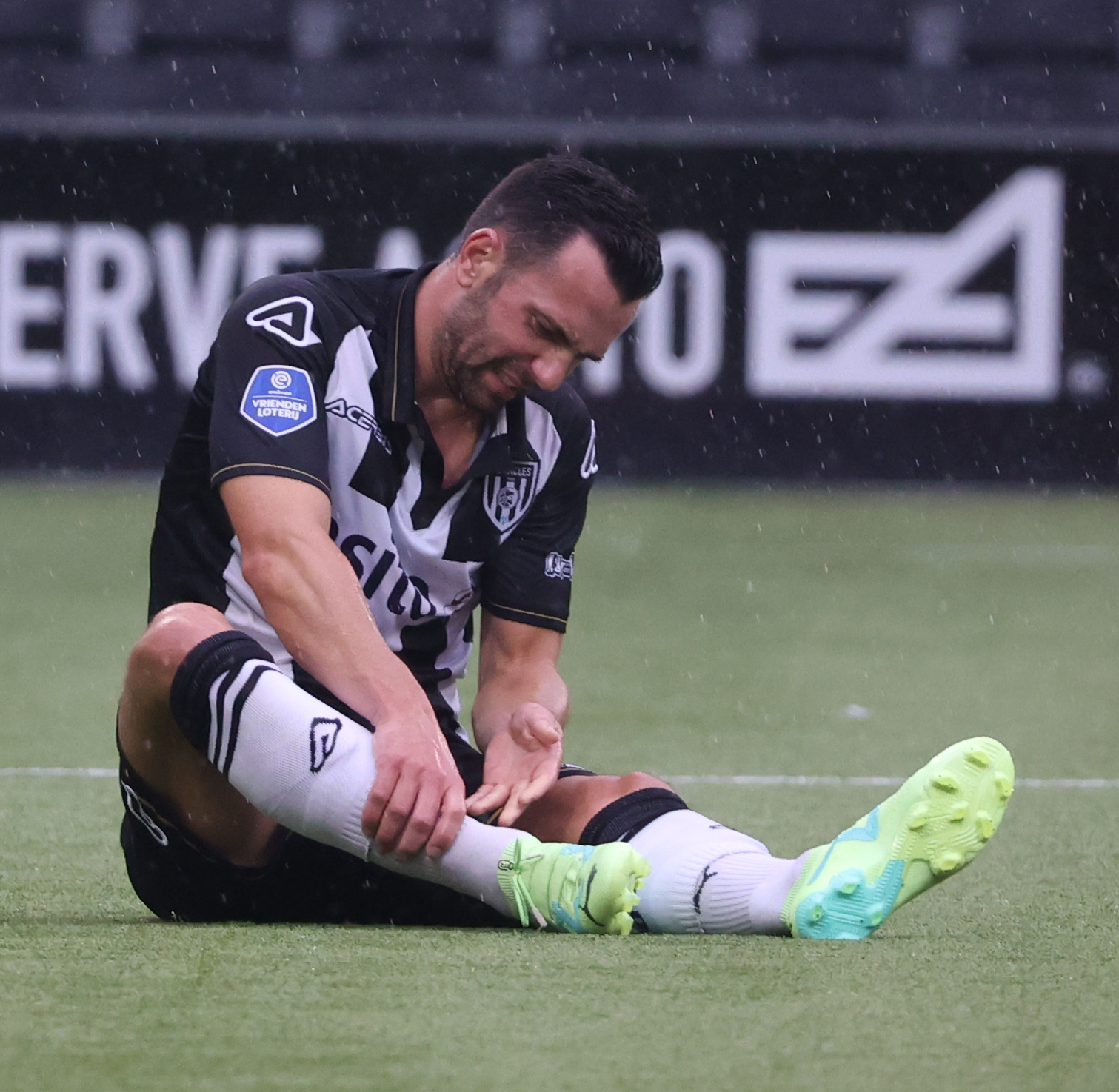
Bruns with Heracles Almelo in 2023

Born in Wierden, Bruns is a product of the local youth academy (Dutch source), which since 2020 has developed into an equal venture between Heracles Almelo and FC Twente. Bruns left the Hengelo-based institute in 2011 to join Eredivisie side Heracles Almelo. A couple of months after joining the club, Bruns finally made his debut on 9 April 2011, in Heracles' 6–2 away victory against Willem II, replacing Everton in the 79th minute. The following season, Bruns scored his first league goal for Heracles, in their 4–2 home defeat against Heerenveen. After a couple of seasons at the club, Bruns finally became a regular in the starting eleven, during Heracles' 2014–15 campaign, making twenty-nine starts and netting seven times.

=== Vitesse ===
On 10 April 2017, it was announced that Bruns would join Vitesse on a free transfer, at the end of the 2016–17 campaign upon the expiry of his current contract at Heracles.

==== FC Groningen ====
On 24 December 2018, it was announced that Bruns would join fellow Eredivisie side Groningen on loan for the remainder of the campaign as of 1 January 2019.

=== Adanaspor ===
On 12 August 2021, he joined Turkish TFF First League club Adanaspor on a two-year contract. He made his debut for Turuncu on 21 August, replacing Uğurcan Yazğılı in the 70th minute of a 0–0 home draw against Gençlerbirliği. On 8 January 2022, he scored his first goal for the club, opening the score in a 3–1 league victory against Bursaspor. Bruns scored three goals in 32 appearances for Adanaspor, as the team avoided relegation by one point.

=== Return to Heracles Almelo ===
On 3 August 2022, Bruns returned to Heracles Almelo and signed a three-year contract.

== Career statistics ==
As of match played 6 April 2019

Appearances and goals by club, season and competition
Club	Season	League			KNVB Cup		Europe		Other		Total	
Club	Season	Division	Apps	Goals	Apps	Goals	Apps	Goals	Apps	Goals	Apps	Goals
Heracles Almelo	2010–11	Eredivisie	1	0	0	0	—		0	0	1	0
Heracles Almelo	2011–12	Eredivisie	19	1	5	1	—		—		24	2
Heracles Almelo	2012–13	Eredivisie	27	6	3	0	—		—		30	6
Heracles Almelo	2013–14	Eredivisie	31	1	3	1	—		—		34	2
Heracles Almelo	2014–15	Eredivisie	32	7	2	0	—		—		34	7
Heracles Almelo	2015–16	Eredivisie	33	5	2	0	—		4 (Note: Appearance(s) in Eredivisie European play-offs)	2	39	7
Heracles Almelo	2016–17	Eredivisie	32	4	1	0	2 (Note: Appearance(s) in UEFA Europa League)	0	—		35	4
Heracles Almelo	Total		175	24	16	2	2	0	4	2	197	28
Vitesse	2017–18	Eredivisie	29	3	1	0	5	1	4 (Note: One appearance in Johan Cruyff Shield, three in Eredivisie European play-offs)	0	39	4
Vitesse	2018–19	Eredivisie	8	0	1	0	3	0	—		12	0
Vitesse	Total		37	3	2	0	8	1	4	0	51	4
Groningen (loan)	2018–19	Eredivisie	15	2	0	0	—		2	0	17	2
PEC Zwolle (loan)	2019–20	Eredivisie	8	1	0	0	—		–		8	1
VVV-Venlo (loan)	2019–20	Eredivisie	6	0	0	0	—		–		6	0
Career total			241	30	18	2	10	1	10	2	279	35
