= Henk Fraser =

Dutch footballer (born 1966)

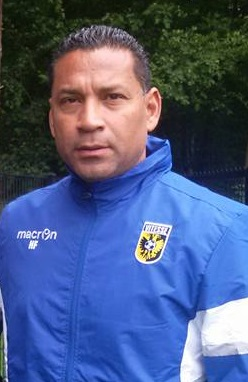
- Fraser in 2018 as manager of Vitesse

Personal information
- Full name: Hendrikus Fraser
- Date of birth: 7 July 1966 (age 60)
- Place of birth: Paramaribo, Suriname
- Height: 1.81 m (5 ft 11 in)
- Position: Centre back

Team information
- Current team: Suriname (manager)

Youth career
- RFC Rotterdam

Senior career*
| Years | Team | Apps | (Gls) |
| 1984–1986 | Sparta | 12 | (0) |
| 1986–1988 | Utrecht | 58 | (12) |
| 1988–1990 | Roda JC | 58 | (6) |
| 1990–1999 | Feyenoord | 138 | (15) |
| Total | | 266 | (33) |

International career
| 1989–1992 | Netherlands | 6 | (0) |

Managerial career
- 1999–2007: Feyenoord (youth)
- 2007–2009: ADO Den Haag (assistant)
- 2009–2011: PSV (youth)
- 2011–2014: ADO Den Haag (assistant)
- 2012–2014: Netherlands U21 (assistant)
- 2014–2016: ADO Den Haag
- 2016–2018: Vitesse
- 2018–2022: Sparta
- 2021–2022: Netherlands (assistant)
- 2022: Utrecht
- 2023–2025: RKC
- 2025: Suriname (assistant)
- 2026: Shaanxi Union
- 2026–: Suriname
- * Club domestic league appearances and goals

Hendrikus "Henk" Fraser (born 7 July 1966) is a Dutch football coach and former player. He is the current manager of the Suriname national team.

He played as a defender for various Dutch teams. Born in Suriname, he earned six caps for the Netherlands national team. He was a member of the Dutch team at the 1990 FIFA World Cup in Italy under coach Leo Beenhakker. He made his debut for the Netherlands on 6 September 1989, in a friendly against Denmark (2–2).

== Playing career ==
Fraser played for Sparta Rotterdam (1984–86), Utrecht (1986–88), Roda JC (1988–90), and Feyenoord (1990–99), with whom he won the Dutch title twice (in 1993 and 1999). After his professional career ended, he became a youth coach at Feyenoord.

== Managerial career ==
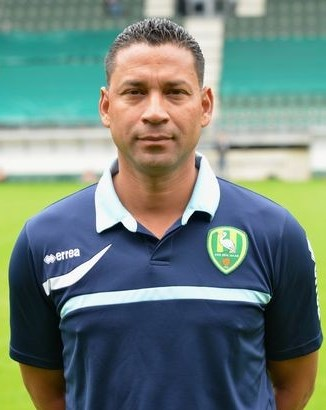
Fraser with ADO Den Haag in 2012.

=== ADO Den Haag ===
Being assistant of Maurice Steijn for two years, Fraser became first the caretaking manager of ADO Den Haag after Steijn had been sacked. However, a month later he signed deal with the club to be the permanent manager until the summer of 2016.

=== Vitesse ===
Vitesse announced on 13 June 2016 that Fraser would replace Peter Bosz at the start of the 2016–17 season. In his first full season, won the club first major trophy in its 125-year existence. Fraser defeating AZ by a score of 2–0 in the final of the KNVB Cup, with two goals from Ricky van Wolfswinkel. On 5 August 2017 Vitesse were beaten 1–1 (4–2 on penalties) at De Kuip, Rotterdam in the Johan Cruyff Shield final by Feyenoord.

On 18 December 2017, Fraser announced he would not be extending his ending contract at the end of the season, leaving the club. On 12 March 2018, it was announced that russian coach Leonid Slutsky would replace Henk Fraser as the new manager of Vitesse for the start of the 2018-19 season. On 23 March 2018, Fraser was presented as the new head coach for Sparta Rotterdam for the following season. Following a significant dip in form, Fraser was relieved of his duties in April 2018, two months prior to the conclusion of his contract at Vitesse.

=== Sparta Rotterdam ===
In December 2017, the board of Sparta Rotterdam announced that they had recruited Dick Advocaat to succeed the dismissed Alex Pastoor. The former national team coach of Netherlands signed for six months and was instructed to keep Sparta in the Eredivisie. In the meantime, club management were looking for a head coach for the new season. On 23 March 2018, Fraser signed a two-year contract with Sparta, beginning on 1 July. Despite Advocaat's presence, Sparta were relegated to the second-tier Eerste Divisie after a 3–1 defeat against Emmen. In his first season as head coach, Fraser won promotion to the Eredivisie through the play-offs. In the following season, Sparta finished eleventh in the COVID-19 abandoned Eredivisie season. In the 2020–21 season, Sparta finished in eighth place in the Eredivisie under the leadership of Fraser, thereby qualifying for the European football play-offs. However, Sparta was defeated by Feyenoord in the first play-off round. On 24 April 2022, Fraser resigned after Sparta told him about their intention to fire assistant manager Aleksandar Ranković. At the time of his resignation Sparta was in the 18th place of the Eredivisie with 4 matches remaining.

=== Utrecht ===
In April 2022, Utrecht announced that Fraser would become the club's new coach for the new season, signing a contract for three seasons. On 14 December 2022, after a training accident with Amin Younes, he left the club.

==== RKC Waalwijk ====
In May 2023, Fraser was appointed head coach of RKC Waalwijk as the successor to Joseph Oosting, who left for FC Twente. He took charge at the start of the 2023–24 season and kept the club in the Eredivisie in his first campaign.

RKC again battled relegation during the 2024–25 season. In September 2024, the club attracted national attention by signing Mohamed Ihattaren, whose return to professional football Fraser publicly supported. In April 2025, Fraser announced that he would leave at the end of the season after the expiry of his two-year spell.

RKC were relegated from the Eredivisie at the end of the campaign, and Fraser was succeeded by Sander Duits.

== Career statistics ==
=== Club ===
Appearances and goals by club, season and competition
| Club | Season | League | Apps | Goals |
|---|---|---|---|---|
| Sparta | 1984–85 | Eredivisie | 8 | 0 |
| Sparta | 1985–86 | Eredivisie | 4 | 0 |
| Utrecht | 1986–87 | Eredivisie | 30 | 10 |
| Utrecht | 1987–88 | Eredivisie | 28 | 2 |
| Roda JC | 1988–89 | Eredivisie | 31 | 3 |
| Roda JC | 1989–90 | Eredivisie | 27 | 3 |
| Feyenoord | 1988–89 | Eredivisie | 23 | 2 |
| Feyenoord | 1991–92 | Eredivisie | 26 | 6 |
| Feyenoord | 1992–93 | Eredivisie | 20 | 4 |
| Feyenoord | 1993–94 | Eredivisie | 19 | 0 |
| Feyenoord | 1994–95 | Eredivisie | 17 | 0 |
| Feyenoord | 1995–96 | Eredivisie | 1 | 0 |
| Feyenoord | 1996–97 | Eredivisie | 25 | 3 |
| Feyenoord | 1997–98 | Eredivisie | 7 | 0 |
| Feyenoord | 1998–99 | Eredivisie | 0 | 0 |
| Total | | | 286 | 37 |

=== International ===
Appearances and goals by national team and year
| National team | Year | Apps | Goals |
|---|---|---|---|
| Netherlands | 1989 | 1 | 0 |
| Netherlands | 1990 | 3 | 0 |
| Netherlands | 1991 | 0 | 0 |
| Netherlands | 1992 | 2 | 0 |
| Total | | 6 | 0 |

== Managerial statistics ==
As of match played 18 May 2025

Managerial record by team and tenure
| Team | Nat | From | To | Record | | | | | | | | Ref |
| Team | Nat | From | To | G | W | D | L | GF | GA | GD | Win % | Ref |
|---|---|---|---|---|---|---|---|---|---|---|---|---|
| ADO Den Haag | (Netherlands) | 5 February 2014 | 13 June 2016 | 82 | 25 | 30 | 27 | 117 | 120 | −3 | 30.49 | |
| Vitesse | (Netherlands) | 13 June 2016 | 11 April 2018 | 78 | 33 | 19 | 26 | 124 | 96 | +28 | 42.31 | |
| Sparta Rotterdam | (Netherlands) | 1 July 2018 | 24 April 2022 | 139 | 51 | 37 | 51 | 205 | 198 | +7 | 36.69 | |
| Utrecht | (Netherlands) | 1 July 2022 | 14 December 2022 | 15 | 8 | 3 | 4 | 26 | 21 | +5 | 53.33 | |
| RKC Waalwijk | (Netherlands) | 1 July 2023 | 30 June 2025 | 72 | 15 | 15 | 42 | 92 | 137 | −45 | 20.83 | |
| Shaanxi Union | (China) | 1 January 2026 | 7 June 2026 | 10 | 3 | 4 | 3 | 9 | 6 | +3 | 30.00 | |
| Total | | | | 396 | 135 | 108 | 153 | 573 | 578 | −5 | 34.09 | – |

== Honours ==
=== Player ===
Feyenoord

- Eredivisie: 1992–93, 1998–99
- KNVB Cup: 1990–91, 1991–92, 1993–94, 1994–95
- Dutch Supercup (in 1996 renamed as Johan Cruyff Shield): 1991; runner-up: 1992, 1993, 1994, 1995

=== Manager ===
Vitesse

- KNVB Cup: 2016–17
- Johan Cruyff Shield runner-up: 2017
