= Jeroen Houwen =

Dutch footballer (born 1996)

Personal information
- Date of birth: 18 February 1996 (age 30)
- Place of birth: Venray, Netherlands
- Height: 1.90 m (6 ft 3 in)
- Position: Goalkeeper

Youth career
- 2000–2009: SVOC '01
- 2009–2012: VVV
- 2012–2016: Vitesse

Senior career*
Years	Team	Apps	(Gls)
2016–2019	Jong Vitesse	49	(0)
2017–2023	Vitesse	27	(0)
2018	→ Telstar (loan)	8	(0)
2020	→ Go Ahead Eagles (loan)	0	(0)
2023–2025	RKC	28	(0)

International career
2011	Netherlands U15		
2011	Netherlands U16	1	(0)
2013	Netherlands U17	2	(0)
2013	Netherlands U18	1	(0)
2014	Netherlands U19	1	(0)
- * Club domestic league appearances and goals as of 7 June 2025

Jeroen Houwen (born 18 February 1996) is a Dutch professional footballer who plays as a goalkeeper.

== Club career ==
=== Vitesse ===
Houwen was born in Venray, and grew up in Oirlo. He joined Vitesse in 2012 and quickly progressed to the first-team squad, appearing as a substitute throughout the 2014–15 campaign. On 19 November 2017, Houwen finally made his Vitesse debut in their 4–2 away defeat against Groningen.

On 27 August 2018, Houwen agreed to join Eerste Divisie side, Telstar on a season-long loan.

=== RKC Waalwijk ===
On 15 May 2023, Houwen signed a two-year deal with Eredivisie club RKC Waalwijk. During his first season at the club, Houwen served as a backup to Etienne Vaessen. However, he became the starting goalkeeper ahead of the 2024–25 season, securing the position over new signing Yanick van Osch.

== International career ==
Houwen played 2 games for the Netherlands national under-17 football team and once for the U19s. He also played for the U15 team.
