= 2011–12 NextGen Series =

Tournament details
- Dates: 17 August 2011 – 25 March 2012
- Teams: 16 (from 1 confederation)

Final positions
- Champions: (Italy) Internazionale (1st title)
- Runners-up: (Netherlands) Ajax
- Third place: (England) Liverpool
- Fourth place: (France) Marseille

Tournament statistics
- Matches played: 56
- Top scorer(s): (Denmark) Viktor Fischer (Cameroon) Jean Marie Dongou (7 goals)

The 2011–12 NextGen Series was the inaugural season of the NextGen Series, an association football tournament which involved the under-19 teams from 16 clubs from across Europe.

== Group stage ==
The teams were sorted into four groups of four, where they played each other home and away in a double round robin format. The top two teams advanced to the knock-out stages.

=== Group 1 ===
Team	Pld	W	D	L	GF	GA	GD	Pts
(Spain) Barcelona	6	5	0	1	20	9	+11	15
(France) Marseille	6	4	0	2	11	10	+1	12
(Scotland) Celtic	6	3	0	3	11	12	-1	9
(England) Manchester City	6	0	0	6	6	17	-11	0

Kickoff times are in CET.

17 August 2011
20:30

Marseille (France)	1 – 0	(Scotland) Celtic
Bangoura 6'	Report

Stade Marcel Cerdan, Carnoux-en-Provence

31 August 2011
20:30

Celtic (Scotland)	1 – 3	(Spain) Barcelona
Watt 23'	Report	Ernesto 17'; Patric 37'; Dongou 48'

Celtic Park, Glasgow

15 September 2011
20:00

Manchester City (England)	1 – 2	(Spain) Barcelona
Bunn 40'	Report	Miguel Ángel 52', 74'

Ewen Fields, Hyde

29 September 2011
20:30

Barcelona (Spain)	4 – 1	(France) Marseille
Ernesto 3'; Dongou 46', 88'; Enukidze 54' (o.g.)	Report	Aloè 64'

Mini Estadi, Barcelona

5 October 2011
18:00

Marseille (France)	3 – 0	(England) Manchester City
Jobello 18'; Ammari 82'; Moulet 90+4'	Report

Stade Marcel Cerdan, Carnoux-en-Provence

17 October 2011
20:00

Manchester City (England)	2 – 4	(Scotland) Celtic
Román 10'; Suárez 65'	Report	Herron 25'; George 39', 59'; Watt 68'

Ewen Fields, Hyde

20 October 2011
18:00

Marseille (France)	4 – 2	(Spain) Barcelona
Aloè 44'; Diop 50' (pen.); Santiago 60'; Abdullah 88'	Report	Ernesto 19'; Dongou 22'

Stade Marcel Cerdan, Carnoux-en-Provence

3 November 2011
20:15

Barcelona (Spain)	4 – 1	(England) Manchester City
Sandro 30', 40'; Miguel Ángel 68'; Ledes 86'	Report	Hiwula 87'

Mini Estadi, Barcelona

7 November 2011
20:30

Celtic (Scotland)	2 – 1	(England) Manchester City
McGeouch 34'; Fraser 41'	Report	Rusnack 67'

Celtic Park, Glasgow

24 November 2011
19:00

Barcelona (Spain)	5 – 1	(Scotland) Celtic
Patric 3'; Dongou 5', 57', 62'; Sandro 74'	Report	Watt 75'

Mini Estadi, Barcelona

24 November 2011
20:00

Manchester City (England)	1 – 2	(France) Marseille
Hiwula 42'	Report	Santiago 34'; Bonelli 81'

Ewen Fields, Hyde

7 December 2011
20:45

Celtic (Scotland)	3 – 0	(France) Marseille
Twardzik 45'; Toshney 57'; George 80'	Report

Celtic Park, Glasgow

=== Group 2 ===
Team	Pld	W	D	L	GF	GA	GD	Pts
(Portugal) Sporting CP	6	5	1	0	20	6	+14	16
(England) Liverpool	6	2	1	3	9	11	−2	7
(Germany) Wolfsburg	6	1	3	2	8	9	−1	6
(Norway) Molde	6	1	1	4	10	21	−11	4

Kickoff times are in CET.

17 August 2011
20:00

Liverpool (England)	0 – 3	(Portugal) Sporting CP
	Report	Teixeira 26'; Betinho 38'; Rosa 86'

Anfield, Liverpool

18 August 2011
19:00

Molde (Norway)	3 – 1	(Germany) Wolfsburg
Hollingen 58'; Bjerkås 90+1'; Tripić 90+4'	Report	Millemaci 50'

Aker Stadion, Molde

31 August 2011
21:00

Sporting CP (Portugal)	2 – 1	(Germany) Wolfsburg
Betinho 45'; Chaby 64'		Arnold 53'

Estádio José Alvalade, Lisbon
Referee: Bruno Esteves

7 September 2011
19:00

Molde (Norway)	0 – 4	(England) Liverpool
	Report	Silva 26', 46'; Coady 57' (pen.); Sterling 82'

Aker Stadion, Molde

14 September 2011
20:00

Liverpool (England)	1 – 1	(Germany) Wolfsburg
Kleihs 87' (o.g.)		Hansen 44'

Anfield, Liverpool

15 September 2011
21:00

Sporting CP (Portugal)	6 – 1	(Norway) Molde
Chaby 6'; Medeiros 13'; Betinho 44', 58'; Mané 90'; Rosa 90'		Stamnestrø 63'

Estádio do Restelo, Lisbon

21 September 2011
18:00

Wolfsburg (Germany)	2 – 0	(England) Liverpool
Güleryüz 48'; Millemaci 54'	Report

Volkswagen Arena, Wolfsburg

29 September 2011
20:00

Liverpool (England)	3 – 0	(Norway) Molde
Morgan 69', 87'; Silva 89'

Anfield, Liverpool

19 October 2011
18:00

Wolfsburg (Germany)	0 – 0	(Portugal) Sporting CP
	Report

VfL-Stadion am Elsterweg, Wolfsburg

2 November 2011
18:00

Wolfsburg (Germany)	3 – 3	(Norway) Molde
Bildirici 35', 42'; Güleryüz 45'	Report	Tripić 6', 88'; Markeng 93'

VfL-Stadion am Elsterweg, Wolfsburg

12 November 2011
15:00

Molde (Norway)	3 – 4	(Portugal) Sporting CP
Furu 18'; Tripić 79' (pen.); Markeng 81'	Report	Fonseca 4'; Guedes 27'; Bruma 47', 55'

Aker Stadion, Molde

16 November 2011
21:00

Sporting CP (Portugal)	5 − 1	(England) Liverpool
Ié 19'; Chaby 35'; Betinho 53', 61'; Etock 86'	Report	Ngoo 39'

Estádio Municipal de Mafra, Mafra

=== Group 3 ===
Team	Pld	W	D	L	GF	GA	GD	Pts
(England) Aston Villa	6	4	0	2	15	7	+8	12
(Netherlands) Ajax	6	3	1	2	9	7	+2	10
(Norway) Rosenborg	6	3	0	3	11	11	0	9
(Turkey) Fenerbahçe	6	1	1	4	5	15	–10	4

Kickoff times are in CET.

17 August 2011
19:30

Ajax (Netherlands)	2 – 0	(England) Aston Villa
De Bondt 17'; Fischer 49'	Report

De Toekomst, Amsterdam

7 September 2011
19:30

Ajax (Netherlands)	5 – 1	(Turkey) Fenerbahçe
Fennich 27', 29'; Fischer 54'; Klaassen 57'; De Sa 67'	Report	Şimşek 43'

De Toekomst, Amsterdam

28 September 2011
19:00

Rosenborg (Norway)	1 – 2	(Netherlands) Ajax
Bakenga 19'	Report	Klaassen 6', 66'

Lerkendal Stadion, Trondheim
Attendance: 830

28 September 2011
20:00

Aston Villa (England)	4 – 0	(Turkey) Fenerbahçe
Carruthers 10'; Gardner 25'; Robinson 54'; Johnson 70'	Report

Villa Park, Birmingham

12 October 2011
19:00

Rosenborg (Norway)	4 – 2	(Turkey) Fenerbahçe
Bakenga 24', 72', 73'; Aasbak 26' (pen.)	Report	Kandemir 4'; Niyaz 62'

Lerkendal Stadion, Trondheim
Attendance: 330

26 October 2011
14:30

Fenerbahçe (Turkey)	1 – 2	(England) Aston Villa
Williams 60' (o.g.)	Report	Johnson 63'; Kinsella 83'

Maltepe Stadı, Istanbul

2 November 2011
20:00

Aston Villa (England)	4 – 1	(Norway) Rosenborg
Burke 45', 84'; Gardner 60'; Drennan 90'	Report	Bakenga 8'

Villa Park, Birmingham

2 November 2011
14:00

Fenerbahçe (Turkey)	0 – 0	(Netherlands) Ajax
	Report

Maltepe Stadı, Istanbul

9 November 2011
20:00

Rosenborg (Norway)	3 – 2	(England) Aston Villa
Selnæs 29', 70'; Bakenga 79'	Report	Williams 39'; Johnson 42'

Lerkendal Stadion, Trondheim

16 November 2011
13:00

Fenerbahçe (Turkey)	1 − 0	(Norway) Rosenborg
Akar 75'	Report

Maltepe Stadı, Istanbul

22 November 2011
20:00

Aston Villa (England)	3 − 0	(Netherlands) Ajax
Gardner 26', 55', 83'	Report

Villa Park, Birmingham

29 November 2011
18:30

Ajax (Netherlands)	0 – 2	(Norway) Rosenborg
	Report	Bjørnholm 52'; Øien 90'

De Toekomst, Amsterdam

=== Group 4 ===
Team	Pld	W	D	L	GF	GA	GD	Pts
(England) Tottenham Hotspur	6	4	2	0	17	6	+11	14
(Italy) Internazionale	6	3	2	1	8	11	–3	11
(Switzerland) Basel	6	1	2	3	4	8	–4	5
(Netherlands) PSV Eindhoven	6	1	0	5	9	13	–4	3

Kickoff times are in CET.

17 August 2011
19:30

Basel (Switzerland)	2 – 2	(England) Tottenham Hotspur
Pak 6'; Maroufi 8'	Report	Kane 16' (pen.); Coulthirst 46'

Stadion Rankhof, Basel
Attendance: 750
Referee: Luke Fähndrich (Switzerland)

31 August 2011
19:30

Basel (Switzerland)	1 – 0	(Netherlands) PSV Eindhoven
Nafiu 20'	Report

Stadion Rankhof, Basel
Attendance: 820
Referee: Sascha Amhof (Switzerland)

31 August 2011
16:00

Tottenham Hotspur (England)	7 – 1	(Italy) Internazionale
Pritchard 7', 67'; Coulibaly 12', 29'; Gomelt 14', 23', 37'	Report	Bessa 39' (pen.)

Brisbane Road, London

14 September 2011
16:00

Internazionale (Italy)	3 − 2	(Netherlands) PSV Eindhoven
Bessa 5'; Longo 44', 93'	Report	Tanane 56'; Van Overbeek 90'

Grazia Deledda, Milan

27 September 2011
15:30

PSV Eindhoven (Netherlands)	1 − 2	(England) Tottenham Hotspur
Rayhi 60'	Report	Coulibaly 43'; Munns 87'

De Herdgang, Eindhoven
Referee: S. Berben

28 September 2011
16:00

Internazionale (Italy)	1 − 0	(Switzerland) Basel
Vojtuš 45+2'	Report

Grazia Deledda, Milan
Attendance: 250
Referee: Minelli (Varese)

19 October 2011
15:00

Tottenham Hotspur (England)	4 – 1	(Netherlands) PSV Eindhoven
Ceballos 18'; Veljković 22'; Pritchard 53'; Oyenuga 55'	Report	Van Ooijen 41'

Spurs Lodge, London

2 November 2011
15:30

PSV Eindhoven (Netherlands)	4 − 1	(Switzerland) Basel
Koch 15'; Ritzmaier 24', 57'; Bentancourt 62'	Report	Shillova 21'

De Herdgang, Eindhoven
Attendance: 150
Referee: Vrijhof

23 November 2011
15:00

Tottenham Hotspur (England)	1 – 0	(Switzerland) Basel
Veljković 22'	Report

Spurs Lodge, London

8 December 2011
14:45

Internazionale (Italy)	1 – 1	(England) Tottenham Hotspur
Pecorini 14'	Report	Pritchard 23'

Stadio Città di Meda, Milan
Referee: Chiffi (Padua)

20 December 2011
18:00

PSV Eindhoven (Netherlands)	1 – 2	(Italy) Internazionale
Rayhi 75'	Report	Bessa 15'; Longo 33'

De Herdgang, Eindhoven
Referee: Van Der Hurk

3 January 2012
19:30

Basel (Switzerland)	0 – 0	(Italy) Internazionale

== Knockout stage ==
Kickoff times are in CET.

Quarter-finals
(Portugal) Sporting CP	0
(Italy) Internazionale	1
(England) Aston Villa	1
(France) Marseille (a.e.t.)	2
(England) Tottenham Hotspur	1
(England) Liverpool (Note: Tottenham Hotspur voluntarily withdrew after they became aware that they had breached competition rules by fielding two under-age players. Liverpool were asked to take part in the Semi-Finals in their place.)	0
(Spain) Barcelona	0
(Netherlands) Ajax	3

Semi-finals
(Italy) Internazionale	2
(France) Marseille	0
(England) Liverpool	0
(Netherlands) Ajax	6

Final
(Italy) Internazionale (pen.)	1 (5)
(Netherlands) Ajax	1 (3)

=== Quarter-finals ===
25 January 2012
20:00

Aston Villa (England)	1 – 2 (a.e.t.)	(France) Marseille
Gardner 90'	Report	Gadi 36'; Omrani 101'

Villa Park, Birmingham
Referee: Steve Martin

25 January 2012
20:30

Sporting CP (Portugal)	0 – 1	(Italy) Internazionale
	Report	Mbaye 55'

Estádio Dr. Magalhães Pessoa, Leiria
Attendance: 6509
Referee: Rui Silva

1 February 2012
20:00

Tottenham Hotspur (England)	1 – 0 (Note: Tottenham Hotspur voluntarily withdrew after they became aware that they had breached competition rules by fielding two under-age players. Liverpool were asked to take part in the Semi-Finals in their place.)	(England) Liverpool
Coulthirst 71'	Report

White Hart Lane, London
Referee: A Davies

8 February 2012
18:30

Barcelona (Spain)	0 – 3	(Netherlands) Ajax
	Report	Fischer 55', 81'; Schoop 67'

Mini Estadi, Barcelona

=== Semi-finals ===
14 March 2012
20:30

Liverpool (England)	0 – 6	(Netherlands) Ajax
	Report	Fischer 7', 48', 71'; Klaassen 62' (pen.), 70'; De Sa 42'

Langtree Park, St Helens
Attendance: 6,000

21 March 2012
19:00

Internazionale (Italy)	2 − 0	(France) Marseille
Crisetig 3'; Longo 42'	Report

Griffin Park, London

=== 3rd place ===
24 March 2012
11:00

Liverpool (England)	2 − 0	(France) Marseille
Ngoo 40'; Morgan 90'	Report

Cobham Training Centre, London

=== Final ===
25 March 2012
14:30

Internazionale (Italy)	1–1 (a.e.t.)	(Netherlands) Ajax
Longo 45'	Report	Denswil 50'
Penalties
Bessa (penalty scored); Duncan (penalty scored); Alborno (penalty scored); Longo (penalty scored); Crisetig (penalty scored)	5–3	(penalty scored) Denswil; (penalty scored) Klaassen; (penalty missed) Veltman; (penalty scored) De Bondt

Matchroom Stadium, London
Attendance: 2,500
Referee: Lee Collins

Internazionale	Ajax

INTERNAZIONALE:
GK	1	(Italy) Raffaele Di Gennaro
DF	2	(Italy) Simone Pecorini (red card) 120'
DF	3	(Senegal) Ibrahima Mbaye (red card) 70'
DF	4	(Austria) Lukas Spendlhofer
DF	5	(Czech Republic) Marek Kysela
MF	6	(Ghana) Alfred Duncan
MF	7	(Italy) Andrea Romanò (c)
MF	8	(Italy) Lorenzo Crisetig
MF	9	(Italy) Samuele Longo 44'
MF	10	(Italy) Daniel Bessa
FW	11	(Croatia) Marko Livaja	(substituted off) 75'
Substitutes:
GK	12	(Italy) Andrea Sala
DF	13	(Italy) Eugenio Giannetti
DF	14	(Paraguay) Rodrigo Alborno	(substituted on) 75'
MF	15	(Italy) Marco Benassi
FW	16	(Italy) Giovanni Terrani
MF	17	(Italy) Gianmarco Falasca
FW	18	(Italy) Francesco Forte
Manager:
(Italy) Andrea Stramaccioni Man of the Match: Mickey van der Hart Assistant Referees: Lee Betts and Colin Lymer; Fourth Official: Charles Breakspear

AJAX:
GK	1	(Netherlands) Mickey van der Hart
DF	2	(Netherlands) Sven Nieuwpoort
DF	3	(Netherlands) Joël Veltman
DF	4	(Suriname) Stefano Denswil 48'
DF	5	(Netherlands) Mitchell Dijks
DF	6	(Suriname) Fabian Sporkslede
FW	7	(Netherlands) Lesley de Sa	(substituted off) 75'
MF	8	(Belgium) Mats Rits	(substituted off) 105'
FW	9	(Netherlands) Rowendey Schoop	(substituted off) 54'
FW	10	(Netherlands) Davy Klaassen (c)
FW	11	(Denmark) Viktor Fischer
Substitutes:
GK	12	(Netherlands) Peter Leeuwenburgh
DF	13	(Netherlands) Mike Busse
MF	14	(Turkey) Sinan Keskin
FW	15	(Netherlands) Nick de Bondt	(substituted on) 75'
FW	16	(Suriname) Danzell Gravenberch	(substituted on) 54'
DF	17	(Netherlands) Ruben Ligeon
MF	18	(Netherlands) Abdel Malek El Hasnaoui	(substituted on) 105'
Manager:
(Netherlands) Fred Grim

== Top goalscorers ==
Rank	Name	Team	Goals
1	(Denmark) Viktor Fischer	(Netherlands) Ajax	7
1	(Cameroon) Jean Marie Dongou	(Spain) Barcelona	7
3	(Norway) Mushaga Bakenga	(Norway) Rosenborg	6
3	(Portugal) Betinho	(Portugal) Sporting CP	6
3	(England) Gary Gardner	(England) Aston Villa	6
6	(Netherlands) Davy Klaassen	(Netherlands) Ajax	5
6	(Italy) Samuele Longo	(Italy) Internazionale	5
8	(Norway) Zlatko Tripić	(Norway) Molde	4
8	(England) Alex Pritchard	(England) Tottenham Hotspur	4
10	(Croatia) Tomislav Gomelt	(England) Tottenham Hotspur	3
10	(Ivory Coast) Souleymane Coulibaly	(England) Tottenham Hotspur	3
10	(Portugal) Toni Silva	(England) Liverpool	3
10	(Spain) Ernesto Cornejo	(Spain) Barcelona	3
10	(Spain) Miguel Ángel	(Spain) Barcelona	3
10	(England) Daniel Johnson	(England) Aston Villa	3
10	(Portugal) Filipe Chaby	(Portugal) Sporting CP	3
10	(Spain) Sandro	(Spain) Barcelona	3
10	(Scotland) Tony Watt	(Scotland) Celtic	3
10	(Republic of Ireland) Paul George	(Scotland) Celtic	3
10	(Brazil) Daniel Bessa	(Italy) Internazionale	3
21	(Netherlands) Youssef Fennich	(Netherlands) Ajax	2
21	(Netherlands) Lesley de Sa	(Netherlands) Ajax	2
21	(Brazil) Farley Rosa	(Portugal) Sporting CP	2
21	(Germany) Giovanni Millemaci	(Germany) Wolfsburg	2
21	(England) Adam Morgan	(England) Liverpool	2
21	(France) Aloe Baptiste	(France) Marseille	2
21	(Germany) Murat Bildirici	(Germany) Wolfsburg	2
21	(Germany) Andac Güleryüz	(Germany) Wolfsburg	2
21	(Republic of Ireland) Graham Burke	(England) Aston Villa	2
21	(Austria) Marcel Ritzmaier	(Netherlands) PSV Eindhoven	2
21	(Norway) Ole Kristian Selnæs	(Norway) Rosenborg	2
21	(Portugal) Bruma	(Portugal) Sporting CP	2
21	(Norway) Simon Markeng	(Norway) Molde	2
21	(Serbia) Miloš Veljković	(England) Tottenham Hotspur	2
21	(Spain) Patric	(Spain) Barcelona	2
21	(France) Jonathan Santiago	(France) Marseille	2
21	(England) Jordy Hiwula	(England) Manchester City	2
21	(Netherlands) Mohamed Rayhi	(Netherlands) PSV Eindhoven	2
21	(England) Shaq Coulthirst	(England) Tottenham Hotspur	2
