= 2012–13 AFC Ajax season =

Dutch football club season

Ajax
2012–13 season
- Chairman: Hennie Henrichs
- Manager: Frank de Boer
- Eredivisie: 1st
- KNVB Cup: Semi-finals
- Champions League: Group stage
- Europa League: Round of 32
- Johan Cruyff Shield: Runners-up
- Top goalscorer: League: Siem de Jong (12 goals); All: Siem de Jong (16 goals)
Home colours	Away colours

During the 2012–13 season AFC Ajax participated in the Eredivisie, the KNVB Cup, and the UEFA Champions League. The first training took place on Tuesday 26 June 2012. The traditional AFC Ajax Open Day was held on Wednesday 27 June 2012.

== Pre-season ==
The first training for the 2012–13 season was held on 26 June 2012. In preparation for the new season Ajax organized a training stage in De Lutte, Netherlands. The squad from manager Frank de Boer stayed there from 2 July 2012 to 7 July 2012. During this training stage friendly matches were played against SV Huizen, VV Oldenzaal and FC Emmen. Further friendly matches were played against SC Veendam, VV Noordwijk, Celtic, Southampton and Norwich City.

== Player statistics ==
Appearances for competitive matches only

No.	Pos	Nat	Player	Total		Eredivisie		UEFA Champions League UEFA Europa League		KNVB Cup Johan Cruijff-schaal XVII	
No.	Pos	Nat	Player	Apps	Goals	Apps	Goals	Apps	Goals	Apps	Goals
1	GK	(Netherlands) NED	Kenneth Vermeer	39	0	30	0	8	0	1	0
2	DF	(Netherlands) NED	Ricardo van Rhijn	43	1	30	0	8	1	5	0
3	DF	(Belgium) BEL	Toby Alderweireld	45	4	33	2	8	1	4	1
4	DF	(Finland) FIN	Niklas Moisander	41	6	29	4	8	2	4	0
5	MF	(Denmark) DEN	Christian Poulsen	37	0	21+4	0	7+1	0	3+1	0
7	FW	(Serbia) SRB	Miralem Sulejmani	8	0	0+5	0	0+1	0	0+2	0
8	FW	(Denmark) DEN	Christian Eriksen	45	13	33	10	8	1	3+1	2
9	FW	(Iceland) ISL	Kolbeinn Sigþórsson	20	9	12+3	7	2	0	1+2	2
10	FW	(Netherlands) NED	Siem de Jong	47	16	34	12	8	3	4+1	1
11	FW	(Spain) ESP	Isaac Cuenca	5	0	2+1	0	2	0	0	0
15	DF	(Denmark) DEN	Nicolai Boilesen	0	0	0	0	0	0	0	0
16	FW	(Denmark) DEN	Lucas Andersen	1	0	0+1	0	0	0	0	0
17	DF	(Netherlands) NED	Daley Blind	46	2	32+2	2	8	0	4	0
18	FW	(Netherlands) NED	Davy Klaassen	3	0	0+2	0	0	0	0+1	0
19	FW	(Sweden) SWE	Tobias Sana	19	5	9+4	4	3+2	0	1	1
20	MF	(Denmark) DEN	Lasse Schöne	44	7	28+4	6	3+4	0	4+1	1
21	FW	(Netherlands) NED	Derk Boerrigter	43	5	17+13	4	5+3	1	5	0
22	GK	(Netherlands) NED	Jasper Cillessen	11	0	4+1	0	0+1	0	5	0
23	FW	(Netherlands) NED	Danny Hoesen	25	7	4+14	5	1+2	1	3+1	1
25	MF	(South Africa) RSA	Thulani Serero	11	3	4+5	3	0+1	0	1	0
27	FW	(Netherlands) NED	Jody Lukoki	22	3	8+8	3	1+1	0	3+1	0
30	GK	(Netherlands) NED	Mickey van der Hart	0	0	0	0	0	0	0	0
32	DF	(Netherlands) NED	Ruben Ligeon	2	0	1	0	0	0	1	0
33	DF	(Netherlands) NED	Joël Veltman	10	0	2+5	0	0	0	2+1	0
34	DF	(Netherlands) NED	Stefano Denswil	5	1	2+2	0	0	0	1	1
35	DF	(Netherlands) NED	Mitchell Dijks	9	0	3+3	0	0	0	3	0
37	FW	(Netherlands) NED	Lesley de Sa	1	0	0+1	0	0	0	0	0
39	FW	(Denmark) DEN	Viktor Fischer	33	12	21+2	10	3+2	0	3+2	2
40	MF	(Netherlands) NED	Fabian Sporkslede	4	0	0+2	0	0+1	0	0+1	0
42	FW	(Netherlands) NED	Joeri de Kamps	0	0	0	0	0	0	0	0
43	MF	(France) FRA	Ilan Boccara	1	0	0+1	0	0	0	0	0
45	GK	(Netherlands) NED	Chiel Kramer	0	0	0	0	0	0	0	0
49	FW	(Netherlands) NED	Ryan Babel	22	5	9+7	4	4	0	1+1	1
Players sold or loaned out after the start of the season:
2	DF	(Netherlands) NED	Gregory van der Wiel	3	1	3	1	0	0	0	0
5	MF	(Netherlands) NED	Vurnon Anita	2	0	1	0	0	0	1	0
6	MF	(Cameroon) CMR	Eyong Enoh	9	0	1+2	0	1+3	0	1+1	0
11	FW	(Netherlands) NED	Lorenzo Ebecilio	0	0	0	0	0	0	0	0
16	MF	(Netherlands) NED	Theo Janssen	3	1	1+1	1	0	0	1	0
23	FW	(Armenia) ARM	Aras Özbiliz	1	0	0	0	0	0	1	0
26	DF	(Netherlands) NED	Dico Koppers	1	0	0	0	0	0	0+1	0
29	MF	(Belgium) BEL	Mats Rits	0	0	0	0	0	0	0	0
36	MF	(Netherlands) NED	Roly Bonevacia	0	0	0	0	0	0	0	0
38	DF	(Netherlands) NED	Sven Nieuwpoort	0	0	0	0	0	0	0	0
41	FW	(Turkey) TUR	Yener Arıca	0	0	0	0	0	0	0	0
56	FW	(Netherlands) NED	Gino van Kessel	0	0	0	0	0	0	0	0
66	DF	(Netherlands) NED	Xandro Schenk	0	0	0	0	0	0	0	0

Updated 4 July 2012

=== 2012–13 Selection by Nationality ===
Nationality	(Netherlands)	(Denmark)	(Serbia)	(Finland)	(Belgium)	(Iceland)	(South Africa)	(Spain)	(Sweden)	(France)	(Cameroon)	Total Players
Current squad selection	12	5	1	1	1	1	1	1	1	-	-	24
Youth/reserves squad in AFC Ajax selection	7	1	2	-	-	-	-	-	-	1	-	11
Players out on loan	6	-	-	1	-	-	-	-	-	-	1	8

== Team statistics ==
=== Eredivisie standings 2012–13 ===
Current standing	Matches played	Wins	Draws	Losses	Points	Goals for	Goals against	Yellow cards (yellow card)	Red cards (red card)
1	34	22	10	2	76	83	31	25	4

==== Points by match day ====
Match day	1	2	3	4	5	6	7	8	9	10	11	12	13	14	15	16	17	18	19	20	21	22	23	24	25	26	27	28	29	30	31	32	33	34	Total
Points	1	3	3	1	3	1	3	1	1	1	0	3	3	3	3	3	3	1	3	0	3	1	3	1	3	3	3	3	3	3	1	3	3	3	76

==== Total points by match day ====
Match day	1	2	3	4	5	6	7	8	9	10	11	12	13	14	15	16	17	18	19	20	21	22	23	24	25	26	27	28	29	30	31	32	33	34	Total
Points	1	4	7	8	11	12	15	16	17	18	18	21	24	27	30	33	36	37	40	40	43	44	47	48	51	54	57	60	63	66	67	70	73	76	76

==== Standing by match day ====
Match day	1	2	3	4	5	6	7	8	9	10	11	12	13	14	15	16	17	18	19	20	21	22	23	24	25	26	27	28	29	30	31	32	33	34	Standing
Standing	5	2	2	4	3	3	4	4	4	4	6	4	4	4	4	4	3	3	3	3	2	2	2	2	2	1	1	1	1	1	1	1	1	1	1

==== Goals by match day ====
Match day	1	2	3	4	5	6	7	8	9	10	11	12	13	14	15	16	17	18	19	20	21	22	23	24	25	26	27	28	29	30	31	32	33	34	Total
Goals	2	6	5	2	2	1	1	1	3	2	0	4	2	2	3	2	4	0	3	2	3	1	2	1	2	3	3	4	4	3	1	2	5	2	83

=== Statistics for the 2012–13 season ===
- This is an overview of all the statistics for played matches in the 2012–13 season.

	Friendlies	Johan Cruijff Schaal	KNVB Cup	UEFA Champions League	UEFA Europa League	Eredivisie	Total
Matches	10 of 11	1 of 1	5 of 5	6 of 6	2 of 2	34 of 34	57 of 58
Win	7 of 11	0 of 1	4 of 5	1 of 6	1 of 2	22 of 34	35 of 58
Draw	2 of 11	0 of 1	0 of 5	1 of 6	0 of 2	10 of 34	13 of 58
Loss	1 of 11	1 of 1	1 of 5	4 of 6	1 of 2	2 of 34	9 of 58
Home	2 of 11	1 of 1	1 of 5	3 of 3	1 of 1	17 of 17	27 of 27
Away	8 of 11	0 of 1	4 of 5	3 of 3	1 of 1	17 of 17	33 of 34
Yellow cards (yellow card)	0	4	7	7	4	33	51
Red cards (red card)	0	0	0	0	0	2	2
2 x yellow in 1 match (yellow card) (yellow-red card)	0	0	0	0	0	2	2
Number of substitutes used (substituted on) (substituted off)	82	3	15	17	6	94	217
Goals for	39	2	12	8	2	83	146
Goals against	5	4	3	16	2	31	61
Balance	+34	-2	+9	-8	0	+52	+86
Clean sheets	5	0	4	0	1	15	25
Penalties for	1	0	0	0	2	1	4
Penalties against	0	0	0	0	4	0	4

=== 2012–13 Team records ===
Description	Competition	Result
Biggest win	(Netherlands) Friendly match	VV Oldenzaal – AFC Ajax ( 0–11 )
Biggest win	(Netherlands) Johan Cruijff Schaal	—
Biggest win	(Netherlands) KNVB Cup	SBV Vitesse - AFC Ajax ( 0–4 )
Biggest win	(Europe) UEFA Champions League	AFC Ajax – Manchester City ( 3–1 )
Biggest win	(Europe) UEFA Europa League	AFC Ajax - Steaua București ( 2–0 )
Biggest win	(Netherlands) Eredivisie	NEC – AFC Ajax ( 1–6 )
Biggest loss	(Brazil) Friendly match	Vasco da Gama – AFC Ajax ( 1–0 )
Biggest loss	(Netherlands) Johan Cruijff Schaal	AFC Ajax – PSV ( 2–4 )
Biggest loss	(Netherlands) KNVB Cup	AFC Ajax – AZ ( 0–3 )
Biggest loss	(Europe) UEFA Champions League	AFC Ajax - Real Madrid ( 1–4 ) AFC Ajax - Borussia Dortmund ( 1–4 )
Biggest loss	(Europe) UEFA Europa League	Steaua București - AFC Ajax ( 2–0 )
Biggest loss	(Netherlands) Eredivisie	AFC Ajax – SBV Vitesse ( 0–2 )
Most goals in a match	(Netherlands) Friendly match	VV Oldenzaal – AFC Ajax ( 0–11 )
Most goals in a match	(Netherlands) Johan Cruyff Shield	AFC Ajax – PSV ( 2–4 )
Most goals in a match	(Netherlands) KNVB Cup	SBV Vitesse - AFC Ajax ( 0–4 )
Most goals in a match	(Europe) UEFA Champions League	AFC Ajax - Real Madrid ( 1–4 ) AFC Ajax - Borussia Dortmund ( 1–4 )
Most goals in a match	(Europe) UEFA Europa League	AFC Ajax - Steaua București ( 2–0 )
Most goals in a match	(Netherlands) Eredivisie	NEC – AFC Ajax ( 1–6 )

==== Topscorers ====
Friendlies

Nr.	Name	Goal
1.	(Armenia) Aras Özbiliz	6
2.	(Netherlands) Davy Klaassen	5
3.	(Netherlands) Siem de Jong	4
3.	(Denmark) Viktor Fischer	4
3.	(Iceland) Kolbeinn Sigþórsson	4
6.	(South Africa) Thulani Serero	3
7.	(Netherlands) Lesley de Sa	2
7.	(Denmark) Lasse Schöne	2
9.	(Netherlands) Joël Veltman	1
9.	(Netherlands) Jody Lukoki	1
9.	(Netherlands) Ruben Ligeon	1
9.	(Netherlands) Lorenzo Ebecilio	1
9.	(Netherlands) Theo Janssen	1
9.	(Netherlands) Daley Blind	1
9.	(Belgium) Mats Rits	1
Own goals	(Suriname) Kelvin Maynard (FC Emmen)	1
Own goals	(Slovakia) Michal Mravec (FC Emmen)	1
Total		39

Johan Cruijff Schaal

Nr.	Name	Goal
1.	(Belgium) Toby Alderweireld	1
Own goals	(Brazil) Marcelo (PSV)	1
Total		2

Eredivisie

Nr.	Name	Goal
1.	(Netherlands) Siem de Jong	12
2.	(Denmark) Christian Eriksen	10
2.	(Denmark) Viktor Fischer	10
4.	(Iceland) Kolbeinn Sigþórsson	7
5.	(Denmark) Lasse Schöne	6
6.	(Netherlands) Derk Boerrigter	5
6.	(Netherlands) Danny Hoesen	5
8.	(Sweden) Tobias Sana	4
8.	(Finland) Niklas Moisander	4
8.	(Netherlands) Ryan Babel	4
11.	(Netherlands) Jody Lukoki	3
11.	(South Africa) Thulani Serero	3
13.	(Belgium) Toby Alderweireld	2
13.	(Netherlands) Daley Blind	2
15.	(Netherlands) Gregory van der Wiel	1
15.	(Netherlands) Theo Janssen	1
Own goals	(Netherlands) Ben Rienstra (Heracles Almelo)	1
Own goals	(Georgia (country)) Guram Kashia (Vitesse)	1
Own goals	(Netherlands) Rens van Eijden (NEC)	1
Own goals	(Netherlands) Tim Gilissen (NAC Breda)	1
Total		83

KNVB Cup

Nr.	Name	Goal
1.	(Denmark) Christian Eriksen	2
1.	(Denmark) Viktor Fischer	2
1.	(Iceland) Kolbeinn Sigþórsson	2
3.	(Sweden) Tobias Sana	1
3.	(Netherlands) Ryan Babel	1
3.	(Netherlands) Stefano Denswil	1
3.	(Netherlands) Siem de Jong	1
3.	(Netherlands) Danny Hoesen	1
3.	(Denmark) Lasse Schöne	1
Total		12

UEFA Champions League

Nr.	Name	Goal
1.	(Netherlands) Siem de Jong	3
2.	(Finland) Niklas Moisander	2
3.	(Denmark) Christian Eriksen	1
3.	(Netherlands) Danny Hoesen	1
3.	(Netherlands) Derk Boerrigter	1
Total		8

UEFA Europa League

Nr.	Name	Goal
1.	(Belgium) Toby Alderweireld	1
1.	(Netherlands) Ricardo van Rhijn	1
Total		2

== Placements ==
	Friendlies	Johan Cruijff Schaal	KNVB Cup	UEFA Champions League	UEFA Europa League	Eredivisie
Status	10 played, 7 wins, 2 draw, 1 loss	Runner-up; Last opponent: PSV	Semi-finals; Last opponent: AZ	3rd Place in Group D Placement for: UEFA Europa League	Round of 32; Last opponent: Steaua București	Champions; 76 points in 34 matches 32nd title

- Daley Blind is voted Player of the year by the supporters of AFC Ajax.
- Viktor Fischer is voted Talent of the year by the supporters of AFC Ajax.
- Frank de Boer is winner of the Rinus Michels Award 2013 in the category: Best Trainer/Coach in Professional Football.
- Niklas Moisander is voted Finnish Footballer of the Year: 2012 by the Football Association of Finland.
- Niklas Moisander is voted Finnish Sports' Journalists Player of the Year: 2012
- Viktor Fischer is voted Danish Talent of the Year by the Danish Football Association and TV2.
- Christian Eriksen wins the Silver boots award.

== Pre-season and friendlies ==
30 June 2012	SV Huizen (Netherlands)	1–3	(Netherlands) Ajax	Huizen, Netherlands
15:00	Denswil 18' (o.g.)	Report	Klaassen 51'; De Jong 61'; Fischer 62'	Stadium: Sportpark De Wolfskamer; Attendance: 3,000; Referee: Roelof Luinge

6 July 2012	VV Oldenzaal (Netherlands)	0–11	(Netherlands) Ajax	Oldenzaal, Netherlands
19:00		Report	Fischer 6', 41'; Klaassen 12', 45'; Özbiliz 12', 18', 43', 68'; Serero 28'; De Sa 54', 74'	Stadium: Sportpark De Thij; Attendance: - Referee: Björn Kuipers

7 July 2012	FC Emmen (Netherlands)	0–5	(Netherlands) Ajax	Emmen, Netherlands
14:30		Report	Maynard 8' (o.g.); Sigþórsson 14'; De Jong 30'; Klaassen 49'; Mravec 90' (o.g.)	Stadium: Univé Stadion

11 July 2012	SC Veendam (Netherlands)	1–5	(Netherlands) Ajax	Buitenpost, Germany
19:00	Katschner 11'	Report	Özbiliz 13'; De Jong 19'; Fischer 42'; Veltman 86'; Lukoki 90'	Stadium: Sportpark De Swadde; Attendance: 4,200

16 July 2012	VV Noordwijk (Netherlands)	0–8	(Netherlands) Ajax	Noordwijk, Netherlands
15:00		Report	Serero 7'; Schöne 17'; Ligeon 41'; Ebecilio 56'; Klaassen 58'; Janssen 72'; Sigþórsson 81', 84'	Stadium: Sportpark Duinwetering

21 July 2012	Ajax (Netherlands)	4–0	(Scotland) Celtic	Amsterdam, Netherlands
19:00	De Jong 13'; Sigþórsson 21'; Serero 27'; Blind 66' (pen.)	Report		Stadium: Amsterdam Arena

28 July 2012	Southampton (England)	0–1	(Netherlands) Ajax	Southampton, England
16:00		Report	Özbiliz 64'	Stadium: St. Mary's Stadium

31 July 2012	Norwich City (England)	1–1	(Netherlands) Ajax	Norwich, England
20:45	Pilkington 7'	Report	Schöne 30'	Stadium: Carrow Road

9 October 2012	Ajax (Netherlands)	1–1	(Slovakia) AS Trenčín	Amsterdam, Netherlands
	Rits 76'	Report	Mondek 24'	Stadium: Sportpark De Toekomst

13 January 2013	Vasco da Gama (Brazil)	1–0	(Netherlands) Ajax	Rio de Janeiro, Brazil
	Wendel 16'	Report		Stadium: São Januário

25 May 2013	Ajax (Netherlands)	Cancelled	(Italy) Milan	Beijing, China
15:00		Report		Stadium: Workers Stadium

== Competitions ==
All times are in CEST

=== Johan Cruyff Shield ===
5 August 2012	PSV	4–2	Ajax	Amsterdam
18:00 CET	Toivonen 3', 53'; Lens 11'; Wijnaldum 90+3'	Report	Alderweireld 44'; Marcelo 53' (o.g.)	Stadium: Amsterdam ArenA; Attendance: 50,000; Referee: Björn Kuipers

=== Eredivisie ===
12 August 2012 1	Ajax	2–2	AZ	Amsterdam
16:30	Van der Wiel 9'; Blind (yellow card) 45'; Sigþórsson 83'	Report	Altidore 48', 50'; Moisander (yellow card) 57'	Stadium: Amsterdam Arena; Attendance: 48,412; Referee: Kevin Blom

19 August 2012 2	NEC	1–6	Ajax	Nijmegen
16:30	Nuytinck 63'	Report	Lukoki 13', (yellow card) 62'; Eriksen 17'; Sana 20', 83'; Janssen 38'; Dijks (yellow card) 47'; De Jong 53'	Stadium: Stadion de Goffert; Attendance: 12,000; Referee: Pieter Vink

25 August 2012 3	Ajax	5–0	NAC Breda	Amsterdam
20:45	De Jong 2', 90+1'; Moisander 11'; Sana 40'; Serero 49'	Report	De Roover (yellow card) 47'; Botteghin (yellow card) 84'	Stadium: Amsterdam Arena; Attendance: 48,785; Referee: Reinold Wiedemeijer

2 September 2012 4	Heerenveen	2–2	Ajax	Heerenveen
16:30	Finnbogason 30', 45'; Kruiswijk (yellow card) 66'; Zomer (yellow card) 69'; Đuričić (yellow card) 84'	Report	Serero 13', 47', (red card) 53'; Van Rhijn (yellow card) 75'	Stadium: Abe Lenstra Stadion; Attendance: 26,100; Referee: Pol van Boekel

15 September 2012 5	Ajax	2–0	RKC Waalwijk	Amsterdam
18:45	Schöne 52'; Moisander (yellow card) 62'; Lukoki 69'	Report		Stadium: Amsterdam Arena; Attendance: 51,068; Referee: Richard Liesveld

23 September 2012 6	ADO Den Haag	1–1	Ajax	The Hague
12:30	Beugelsdijk 14'; Toornstra (yellow card) 66'	Report	Schöne (yellow card) 21'; Babel 62'; Moisander (yellow card) 83'	Stadium: Kyocera Stadion; Attendance: 11,000; Referee: Danny Makkelie

29 September 2012 7	Ajax	1–0	Twente	Amsterdam
20:45	Eriksen 68'	Report	Tadić (yellow card) 45+1'; Brama (yellow card) 86'	Stadium: Amsterdam Arena; Referee: Pieter Vink

7 October 2012 8	Ajax	1–1	FC Utrecht	Amsterdam
12:30	Babel 6'	Report	Sporkslede 51' (o.g.); Kali (yellow card) 65'	Stadium: Amsterdam Arena; Attendance: 48,836; Referee: Jan Wegereef

20 October 2012 9	Heracles Almelo	3–3	Ajax	Almelo
18:45	Te Wierik 61'; Bruns 80'; Pedro 90'	Report	Rienstra 10' (o.g.); Schöne 25'; Sana 62'	Stadium: Polman Stadion; Referee: Kevin Blom

28 October 2012 10	Feyenoord	2–2	Ajax	Rotterdam
12:30	Boëtius 23'; Immers (yellow card) 48'; De Vrij (yellow card) 50'; Martins Indi (yellow card) 52'; Clasie (yellow card) 84'; Pellè 90', (yellow card) 90+1'	Report	Moisander (yellow card) 26' (yellow-red card) 75'; Eriksen 12'; De Jong 48', (yellow card) 84'	Stadium: Feyenoord Stadion; Attendance: 45,000; Referee: Bas Nijhuis

3 November 2012 11	Ajax	0–2	Vitesse	Amsterdam
18:45	Blind (yellow card) 41'; Denswil (yellow card) 79'	Report	Bony 38', 46'; Janssen (yellow card) 78'	Stadium: Amsterdam Arena; Attendance: 50,965; Referee: Björn Kuipers

11 November 2012 12	PEC Zwolle	2–4	Ajax	Zwolle
12:30	Mokhtar (yellow card) 66'; Avdić 81'; Drost 83'	Report	Alderweireld 12'; Fischer 32', 48'; De Jong 76'	Stadium: Ijsseldelta Stadion; Attendance: 11,324; Referee: Dennis Higler

17 November 2012 13	Ajax	2–0	VVV-Venlo	Amsterdam
19:45	Boerrigter 47'; Hoesen 84'	Report		Stadium: Amsterdam Arena; Attendance: 49,395; Referee: Serdar Gözübüyük

25 November 2012 14	Roda JC	1–2	Ajax	Kerkrade
12:30	Hupperts 14'; Hempte (yellow card) 54'; Malki (yellow card) 58'; Monteyne (yellow card) 67'; Pereira (yellow card) 78'	Report	De Jong (yellow card) 57'; Eriksen 82'; Schöne 88'	Stadium: Parkstad Limburg Stadion; Attendance: 17,159; Referee: Pieter Vink

1 December 2012 15	Ajax	3–1	PSV	Amsterdam
20:45	De Jong 29'; Van Rhijn (yellow card) 71'; Hoesen 72'; Fischer 87'	Report	Lens 36'; Van Bommel (yellow card) 57'; Narsingh (yellow card) 59'; Mertens (yellow card) 74'	Stadium: Amsterdam Arena; Attendance: 51,064; Referee: Björn Kuipers

8 December 2012 16	Ajax	2–0	FC Groningen	Amsterdam
20:45	Boerrigter 42'; Schöne 53' (pen.)	Report	Van Dijk (yellow card) 13'; Kwakman (yellow card) 53'; Bakker (yellow card) 57'; Ajilore (yellow card) 90+2'	Stadium: Amsterdam Arena; Attendance: 50,000; Referee: Richard Liesveld

16 December 2012 17	Willem II	2–4	Ajax	Tilburg
16:30	Joachim 15'; Snijders 28'	Report	De Jong 11'; Hoesen 14'; Moisander 72'; Lukoki 87'	Stadium: Koning Willem II Stadion; Attendance: 10,000; Referee: Kevin Blom

23 December 2012 18	FC Utrecht	0–0	Ajax	Utrecht
14:30		Report		Stadium: Stadion Galgenwaard; Attendance: 18,500; Referee: Danny Makkelie

20 January 2013 19	Ajax	3–0	Feyenoord	Amsterdam
14:30	Fischer 7', 40'; De Jong (yellow card) 28', (goal) 62'; Van Rhijn (yellow card) 38' (yellow-red card) 64'; Alderweireld (yellow card) 84'	Report	Janmaat (yellow card) 44'; Vilhena (yellow card) 79'	Stadium: Amsterdam Arena; Attendance: 53,052; Referee: Pol van Boekel

27 January 2013 20	Vitesse	3–2	Ajax	Arnhem
12:30	Van Aanholt (yellow card) 41', (goal) 79'; Janssen 68'; Ibarra 81'	Report	Moisander (yellow card) 30'; Kashia 33' (o.g.); Eriksen 64'	Stadium: Gelredome; Attendance: 21,867; Referee: Bas Nijhuis

3 February 2013 21	VVV-Venlo	0–3	Ajax	Venlo
20:45	Wildschut (yellow card) 31'	Report	De Jong 34'; Fischer 61'; Boerrigter 82'	Stadium: De Koel; Attendance: 8,000; Referee: Ruud Bossen

10 February 2013 22	Ajax	1–1	Roda JC	Amsterdam
14:30	Blind 54'	Report	Ramzi 39'; Kurto (yellow card) 73'; Donald (yellow card) 85'	Stadium: Amsterdam Arena; Attendance: 50,000; Referee: Maarten Ketting

17 February 2013 23	RKC Waalwijk	0–2	Ajax	Waalwijk
16:30	Sneijder (yellow card) 14'	Report	Moisander 22'; Eriksen 40'; Lukoki (yellow card) 62'; Schöne (yellow card) 72'	Stadium: Mandemakers Stadion; Attendance: 6,000; Referee: Reinold Wiedemeijer

24 February 2013 24	Ajax	1–1	ADO Den Haag	Amsterdam
14:30	Schöne 85'	Report	Van Duinen (yellow card) 25'; Chery 30'	Stadium: Amsterdam Arena; Attendance: 46,772; Referee: Pol van Boekel

2 March 2013 25	Twente	0–2	Ajax	Enschede
14:30		Report	Moisander 4', (yellow card) 27'; Alderweireld 35'	Stadium: De Grolsch Veste; Attendance: 30,000; Referee: Richard Liesveld

10 March 2013 26	Ajax	3–0	PEC Zwolle	Amsterdam
14:30	Sigþórsson 19'; De Jong 26'; Boerrigter 80'	Report		Stadium: Amsterdam Arena; Attendance: 51,650; Referee: Tom van Sichem

17 March 2013 27	AZ	2–3	Ajax	Alkmaar
14:30	Henriksen 47'; Altidore 74'; Viergever (yellow card) 83'	Report	De Jong 20', 59'; Blind 22'; Van Rhijn (yellow card) 25'; Alderweireld (yellow card) 54'	Stadium: AFAS Stadion; Attendance: 16,000; Referee: Björn Kuipers

31 March 2013 28	Ajax	4–1	NEC	Amsterdam
14:30	Fischer 21', 77'; Van Eijden 25' (o.g.); Babel 81'	Report	Conboy (yellow card) 66'; Van der Velden 78'	Stadium: Amsterdam Arena; Attendance: 51,367; Referee: Jan Wegereef

7 April 2013 29	Ajax	4–0	Heracles Almelo	Amsterdam
21:00	Schöne 13', (yellow card) 45'; Vermeer (red card) 48'; Sigþórsson 52'; De Jong (yellow card) 63'; Babel 75'; Eriksen 84'	Report		Stadium: Amsterdam Arena; Attendance: 51,947; Referee: Ruud Bossen

14 April 2013 30	PSV	2–3	Ajax	Eindhoven
14:30	Lens 43', 69'	Report	Sigþórsson 33'; Fischer (yellow card) 41'; Eriksen 52'; Boerrigter 77'	Stadium: Philips Stadion; Attendance: 34,500; Referee: Björn Kuipers

19 April 2013 31	Ajax	1–1	Heerenveen	Amsterdam
20:00	Fischer 26'; Van Rhijn (yellow card) 68'; Schöne (yellow card) 86'	Report	Finnbogason 53'; Van Anholt (yellow card) 71'; El Ghanassy (yellow card) 87'	Stadium: Amsterdam Arena; Attendance: 51,701; Referee: Serdar Gözübüyük

27 April 2013 32	NAC Breda	0–2	Ajax	Breda
14:30	Leugers (yellow card) 86'	Report	Sigþórsson 47'; Gilissen 52' (o.g.)	Stadium: Rat Verlegh Stadion; Attendance: 19,000; Referee: Richard Liesveld

5 May 2013 33	Ajax	5–0	Willem II	Amsterdam
18:30 CET (UTC+01)	Sigþórsson 12'; Eriksen 25'; Fischer 68'; De Jong 82'; Hoesen 89'	Report	Van Buuren (yellow card) 24'	Stadium: Amsterdam Arena; Attendance: 51,963; Referee: Danny Makkelie

12 May 2013 34	FC Groningen	0–2	Ajax	Groningen
14:30	Lindgren (yellow card) 28'; Burnet (yellow card) 30'; Magnasco (yellow card) 37'	Report	Sigþórsson 8'; Boerrigter (yellow card) 37'; Blind (yellow card) 57'; Hoesen 72'	Stadium: Euroborg; Attendance: 21,000; Referee: Reinold Wiedemeijer

=== KNVB Cup ===
26 September 2012 Second round	FC Utrecht	0–3	Ajax	Utrecht
20:45		Report	Sana 11'; Babel 15'; Eriksen 52'	Stadium: Stadion Galgenwaard; Referee: Bas Nijhuis

31 October 2012 Third round	ONS Sneek	0–2	Ajax	Sneek
20:45	De Wagt (yellow card) 69'	Report	Fischer 74'; Enoh (yellow card) 80'; Denswil 88'	Stadium: Zuidersportpark; Attendance: 7,500; Referee: Pol van Boekel

20 December 2012 Fourth round	FC Groningen	0–3	Ajax	Groningen
19:00	Burnet (yellow card) 74'	Report	De Jong 25'; Eriksen 49'; Fischer 60'	Stadium: Euroborg; Attendance: 22,000; Referee: Reinold Wiedemeijer

31 January 2013 Quarter-finals	Vitesse	0–4	Ajax	Emmen
20:15	van Ginkel (yellow card) 35'	Report	Hoesen 7'; Moisander (yellow card) 21'; Schöne 59'; Boerrigter (yellow card) 76'; Sigþórsson 81', 86'	Stadium: Univé Stadion; Attendance: 2,000; Referee: Richard Liesveld

27 February 2013 Semi-finals	Ajax	0–3	AZ	Amsterdam
20:15		Report	Altidore 74', 90+3'; Guðmundsson 88'	Stadium: Amsterdam Arena; Attendance: 11,324; Referee: Ruud Bossen

=== UEFA Champions League ===
==== Group stage ====
Pos	Team	Pld	W	D	L	GF	GA	GD	Pts	Qualification	DOR	RMA	AJX	MCI
1	(Germany) Borussia Dortmund	6	4	2	0	11	5	+6	14	Advance to knockout phase	—	2–1	1–0	1–0
2	(Spain) Real Madrid	6	3	2	1	15	9	+6	11	Advance to knockout phase	2–2	—	4–1	3–2
3	(Netherlands) Ajax	6	1	1	4	8	16	−8	4	Transfer to Europa League	1–4	1–4	—	3–1
4	(England) Manchester City	6	0	3	3	7	11	−4	3		1–1	1–1	2–2	—

Source: Soccerway

18 September 2012 1	Borussia Dortmund (Germany)	1–0	(Netherlands) Ajax	Dortmund, Germany
20:45 CEST	Lewandowski 87'	Report	Sana (yellow card) 37'; Van Rhijn (yellow card) 57'	Stadium: Signal Iduna Park; Attendance: 65,829; Referee: Paolo Tagliavento (Italy)

3 October 2012 2	Ajax (Netherlands)	1–4	(Spain) Real Madrid	Amsterdam, Netherlands
20:45 CEST	Moisander 56'	Report	Ronaldo 42', 79', 81'; Benzema 48'; Essien (yellow card) 58'	Stadium: Amsterdam Arena; Attendance: 49,491; Referee: Jonas Eriksson (Sweden)

24 October 2012 3	Ajax (Netherlands)	3–1	(England) Manchester City	Amsterdam, Netherlands
20:45 CEST	Blind (yellow card) 29'; De Jong 45'; Moisander 57'; Eriksen 68'	Report	Nasri 22'; Kolarov (yellow card) 75'; Y. Touré (yellow card) 79'	Stadium: Amsterdam Arena; Attendance: 45,743; Referee: Svein Oddvar Moen (Norway)

6 November 2012 4	Manchester City (England)	2–2	(Netherlands) Ajax	Manchester, England
20:45 CET	Y. Touré 22'; Agüero 74'	Report	De Jong 10', 18'; Blind (yellow card) 46'; Poulsen (yellow card) 85'	Stadium: City of Manchester Stadium; Attendance: 40,222; Referee: Peter Rasmussen (Denmark)

21 November 2012 5	Ajax (Netherlands)	1–4	(Germany) Borussia Dortmund	Amsterdam, Netherlands
20:45 CET	Enoh (yellow card) 19'; Moisander (yellow card) 85'; Hoesen 87'	Report	Reus 8'; Götze 36', (yellow card) 53'; Lewandowski 43', 64'	Stadium: Amsterdam Arena; Attendance: 47,500; Referee: Pedro Proença (Portugal)

4 December 2012 6	Real Madrid (Spain)	4–1	(Netherlands) Ajax	Madrid, Spain
20:45 CET	Ronaldo 13', (yellow card) 82'; Callejón 28', 88'; Kaká 49'; Carvalho (yellow card) 77'	Report	Boerrigter 59'	Stadium: Santiago Bernabéu Stadium; Attendance: 57,245; Referee: Pavel Královec (Czech Republic)

=== UEFA Europa League ===
==== Knockout phase ====
===== Round of 32 =====
14 February 2013 First leg	Ajax (Netherlands)	2–0	(Romania) Steaua București	Amsterdam, Netherlands
19:00	Alderweireld 28'; Van Rhijn 49'; Moisander (yellow card) 79'	Report	Latovlevici (yellow card) 34'; Bourceanu (yellow card) 35'; Pintilii (yellow card) 85' (yellow-red card) 89'	Stadium: Amsterdam Arena; Attendance: 51,493; Referee: Stanislav Todorov (Bulgaria)

21 February 2013 Second leg	Steaua București (Romania)	2–0 (2–2 agg.) (4–2 p)	(Netherlands) Ajax	Bucharest, Romania
21:05	Gardoș (yellow card) 7'; Latovlevici 38'; Prepeliță (yellow card) 41'; Filip (yellow card) 73'; Chiricheș 76'		Eriksen (yellow card) 32'; De Jong (yellow card) 97'; Poulsen (yellow card) 114'	Stadium: Arena Națională; Attendance: 38,000; Referee: Paolo Tagliavento (Italy)
	Penalties
	Rusescu (penalty scored); Nikolić (penalty scored); Filip (penalty scored); Latovlevici (penalty scored)		(penalty scored) Eriksen; (penalty missed) Schöne; (penalty scored) De Jong; (penalty missed) Moisander

== Transfers for 2012–13 ==
=== Summer transfer window ===
For a list of all Dutch football transfers in the summer window (1 July 2012 to 31 August 2012) please see List of Dutch football transfers summer 2012.

==== Arrivals ====
- The following players moved to AFC Ajax.

	Name	Position	Transfer type	Previous club	Fee
	Return from loan spell				
Substituted on	(Netherlands) Roly Bonevacia	Midfielder	30 June 2012	(Netherlands) NAC Breda	-
Substituted on	(Argentina) Darío Cvitanich	Forward	9 July 2012	(Argentina) Boca Juniors	-
	Transfer				
Substituted on	(France) Ilan Boccara	Midfielder	15 July 2012	(France) Paris Saint-Germain	€500,000
Substituted on	(Sweden) Tobias Sana	Midfielder	30 July 2012	(Sweden) IFK Göteborg	€350,000
Substituted on	(Finland) Niklas Moisander	Defender	20 August 2012	(Netherlands) AZ	€3 million
Substituted on	(Netherlands) Danny Hoesen	Forward	26 August 2012	(England) Fulham	€350,000
Substituted on	(Denmark) Lucas Andersen	Midfielder	31 August 2012	(Denmark) Aalborg BK	€1.3 million
	Free Transfer				
Substituted on	(Denmark) Lasse Schöne	Midfielder	18 April 2012	(Netherlands) NEC	-
Substituted on	(Netherlands) Gino van Kessel	Forward	20 April 2012	(Netherlands) AZ	-
Substituted on	(Denmark) Christian Poulsen	Midfielder	22 August 2012	(France) Evian	-
Substituted on	(Netherlands) Ryan Babel	Forward	31 August 2012	(Germany) 1899 Hoffenheim	-

==== Departures ====
- The following players moved from AFC Ajax.

	Name	Position	Transfer type	New club	Fee
	Out on loan				
Substituted off	(Finland) Henri Toivomäki	Defender	27 June 2012	(Netherlands) Almere City	-
Substituted off	(Netherlands) Geoffrey Castillion	Forward	15 July 2012	(Netherlands) Heracles Almelo	-
	Transfer				
Substituted off	(Netherlands) Marco Bizot	Goalkeeper	14 June 2012	(Netherlands) FC Groningen	€150,000
Substituted off	(Morocco) Mounir El Hamdaoui	Forward	5 July 2012	(Italy) Fiorentina	€850,000
Substituted off	(Belgium) Jan Vertonghen	Defender	7 July 2012	(England) Tottenham Hotspur	€12 million
Substituted off	(Argentina) Darío Cvitanich	Forward	25 July 2012	(France) Nice	€400,000
Substituted off	(Armenia) Aras Özbiliz	Forward	6 August 2012	(Russia) Kuban Krasnodar	€1 million
Substituted off	(Netherlands) Vurnon Anita	Forward	15 August 2012	(England) Newcastle United	€8.5 million
Substituted off	(Netherlands) Theo Janssen	Midfielder	24 August 2012	(Netherlands) Vitesse	€600,000
Substituted off	(Netherlands) Gregory van der Wiel	Defender	31 August 2012	(France) Paris Saint-Germain	€5 million
	Free Transfer				
Substituted off	(Netherlands) André Ooijer	Defender	13 March 2012	—	-
Substituted off	(Uruguay) Bruno Silva	Defender	13 April 2012	—	-
Substituted off	(Netherlands) Ricardo Kip	Midfielder	5 May 2012	(Netherlands) Almere City	-
Substituted off	(Netherlands) Florian Jozefzoon	Forward	25 May 2012	(Netherlands) RKC Waalwijk	-
Substituted off	(Uruguay) Nicolás Lodeiro	Midfielder	8 July 2012	(Brazil) Botafogo	-
Substituted off	(Netherlands) Rodney Sneijder	Midfielder	9 July 2012	(Netherlands) RKC Waalwijk	-
Substituted off	(Russia) Dmitri Bulykin	Forward	19 July 2012	(Netherlands) Twente	-
Substituted off	(Morocco) Ismaïl Aissati	Midfielder	18 August 2012	(Turkey) Antalyaspor	-
Substituted off	(Netherlands) Youssef Fennich	Midfielder	29 August 2012	(Netherlands) Heerenveen	-
Substituted off	(Netherlands) Jeroen Verhoeven	Goalkeeper	29 September 2012	(Netherlands) FC Utrecht	-

=== Winter transfer window ===
For a list of all Dutch football transfers in the winter window (1 January 2013 to 1 February 2013) please see List of Dutch football transfers winter 2012–13.

==== Arrivals ====
- The following players moved to AFC Ajax.

	Name	Position	Transfer type	Previous club	Fee
	Loan				
Substituted on	(Spain) Isaac Cuenca	Forward	31 January 2013	(Spain) Barcelona	-
	Transfer				
Substituted on	(Serbia) Dejan Meleg	Midfielder	23 January 2013	(Serbia) FK Vojvodina	€500,000
	Free Transfer				
Substituted on	(Netherlands) Riechedly Bazoer	Defender	20 November 2012	(Netherlands) PSV	-
Substituted on	(Czech Republic) Václav Černý	Forward	22 January 2013	(Czech Republic) 1. FK Příbram	-
Substituted on	(Greece) Dimitri Silvestridis	Forward	31 January 2013	(Greece) Ajax Hellas Youth Academy	-

==== Departures ====
- The following players moved from AFC Ajax.

	Name	Position	Transfer type	New club	Fee
	Out on loan				
Substituted off	(Netherlands) Roly Bonevacia	Midfielder	1 January 2013	(Netherlands) Roda JC	-
Substituted off	(Netherlands) Xandro Schenk	Defender	4 January 2013	(Netherlands) Go Ahead Eagles	-
Substituted off	(Netherlands) Sven Nieuwpoort	Defender	5 January 2013	(Netherlands) Almere City	-
Substituted off	(Netherlands) Gino van Kessel	Forward	9 January 2013	(Netherlands) Almere City	-
Substituted off	(Cameroon) Eyong Enoh	Midfielder	31 January 2013	(England) Fulham	-
Substituted off	(Netherlands) Dico Koppers	Defender	31 January 2013	(Netherlands) ADO Den Haag	-
	Transfer				
Substituted off	(Netherlands) Lorenzo Ebecilio	Forward	2 January 2013	(Ukraine) Metalurh Donetsk	€500,000
Substituted off	(Belgium) Mats Rits	Midfielder	6 January 2013	(Belgium) KV Mechelen	€100,000
	Free Transfer				
Substituted off	(Turkey) Yener Arıca	Forward	2 January 2013	(Turkey) Kayserispor	-
