= Samuele Longo =

Italian footballer

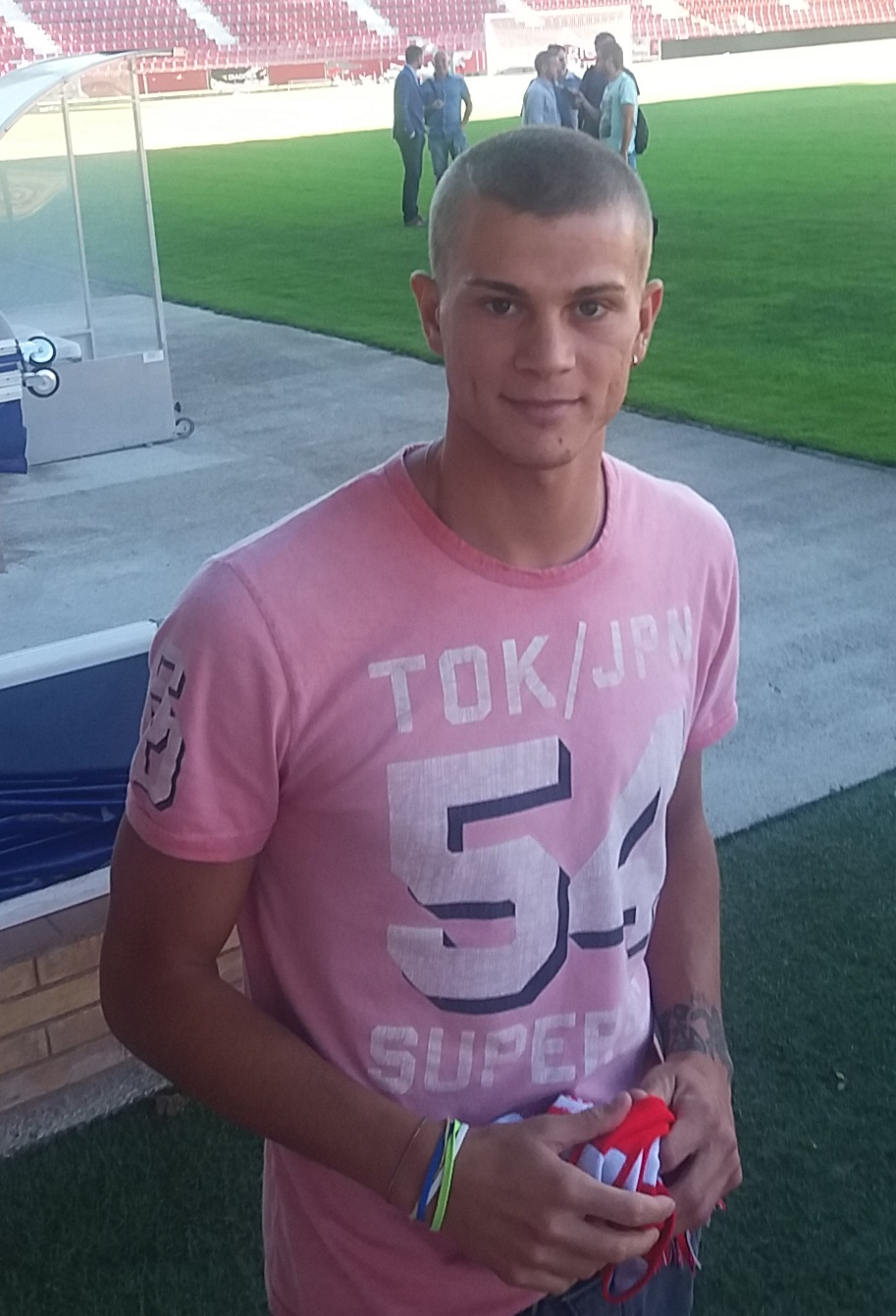
- Longo in 2016

Personal information
- Date of birth: 12 January 1992 (age 34)
- Place of birth: Valdobbiadene, Italy
- Height: 1.85 m (6 ft 1 in)
- Position: Striker

Team information
- Current team: Xerez Deportivo
- Number: 9

Youth career
- 2004–2009: Treviso
- 2009–2012: Inter Milan
- 2010: → Piacenza (loan)
- 2011: → Genoa (loan)

Senior career*
Years	Team	Apps	(Gls)
2011–2020	Inter Milan	1	(0)
2012–2013	→ Espanyol (loan)	18	(3)
2013–2014	→ Hellas Verona (loan)	2	(0)
2014	→ Rayo Vallecano (loan)	9	(0)
2014–2015	→ Cagliari (loan)	27	(0)
2015–2016	→ Frosinone (loan)	18	(0)
2016–2017	→ Girona (loan)	36	(14)
2017–2018	→ Tenerife (loan)	24	(12)
2018–2019	→ Huesca (loan)	15	(1)
2019	→ Cremonese (loan)	4	(0)
2019–2020	→ Deportivo La Coruña (loan)	13	(0)
2020	→ Venezia (loan)	17	(4)
2020–2022	Vicenza	32	(4)
2022	→ Modena (loan)	10	(0)
2022–2023	Dordrecht	36	(12)
2023	Lamia	11	(1)
2024	Ponferradina	17	(2)
2024–2025	Milan Futuro	17	(2)
2025	Antequera	13	(4)
2026–	Xerez Deportivo	11	(0)

International career^{‡}
2011	Italy U19	1	(0)
2011–2012	Italy U20	6	(2)
2012–2015	Italy U21	19	(4)
- * Club domestic league appearances and goals as of 16 May 2026 ‡ National team caps and goals as of 18 December 2016

Samuele Longo (born 12 January 1992) is an Italian professional footballer who plays as a striker for Spanish Segunda Federación club Xerez Deportivo.

== Club career ==
=== Early career ===
Born in Valdobbiadene, Province of Treviso, Veneto, Longo started his career at Treviso FBC 1993. He was a member of the Esordienti under-13 team in the 2004–05 season. In January 2009 Inter Milan bought Longo and Mame Baba Thiam outright.

Longo spent the rest of the 2008–09 season in Treviso's Allievi Nazionali under-17 team in a temporary deal before formally becoming an Inter player on 1 July 2009.

=== Inter Milan ===
==== Youth ====
2009–10

Longo was a junior member of Inter's reserve team in the 2009–10 season, as a backup for Denis Alibec, Mattia Destro and Simone Dell'Agnello. On 28 January 2010, after being sparingly used by Inter, he left for Piacenza Calcio, along with Giuseppe Angarano and Luca Stocchi. In total, Longo only played 4 times in the reserve league that season.

2010–11

In the 2010–2011 season, despite Inter trimming their reserve squad (only composed only of U18 and U19 players plus 3 U20), Longo was unable to become a regular starter, with 11 appearances, (2 starts) and 2 goals. In January 2011, he moved to Genoa in a temporary deal with an option to sign Longo in co-ownership deal, also as a replacement of outgoing reserve forward Gianmarco Zigoni. Longo scored 3 goals for Genoa and 2 goals for Inter in the 2010–11 reserve league. He also appeared in the league's play-offs, losing to eventual champions Roma in the semifinals, forming a partnership with Richmond Boakye; his side was also eliminated by Inter in the quarter-finals of 2011 Torneo di Viareggio.

2011–12

In June 2011 Genoa signed Destro outright from Inter for €4.5M, as well as half of the registration rights of Longo for a peppercorn fee of €500 (also made Inter had to write-down €47,000 for the residual accounting value of his contract). He returned to Inter in a temporary deal on 1 July 2011, being again assigned to the reserves. Longo was a regular starter for the side, but was unable to be the top scorer, scoring eight goals times during the regular season (attacking midfielder Daniel Bessa eventually scored ten times).

Under Andrea Stramaccioni, Longo scored 5 goals in 2011–12 NextGen series as one of the team that won the tournament; his role also sightly changed after the arrival of Marko Livaja as new centre forward, in 4–2–3–1 (and later 4–3–3/4–3–2–1 formation under Daniele Bernazzani). He was also instrumental in the Primavera final stages, netting four goals in three matches (including a brace in the final against Lazio).

==== First-team ====
2011–12

Longo was assigned the number 81 shirt at the start of the 2011–12 season, and played the first four friendlies of the season under former Genoa first team coach Gian Piero Gasperini. However he was left out of the squad submitted for 2011–12 UEFA Champions League, with Giovanni Terrani being included instead.

Longo made his professional debut on 13 May 2012, playing the last 14 minutes of a 1–3 away loss against Lazio.

2012–13

Longo scored his first goal for Inter against Indonesia League Selection on 24 May 2012. In June 2012, Genoa CEO Pietro Lo Monaco once confirmed the co-ownership was renewed but on the deadline date Internazionale bought back Longo for €7 million and sold Juraj Kucka back to Genoa for €6.5 million.

Longo made his international debut on 9 August, coming on as a second half substitute in a 0–2 home loss against Hajduk Split for the season's Europa League.

==== Loan to Espanyol ====
On 28 August 2012, Longo joined Spanish side RCD Espanyol of La Liga on a season-long loan deal, following in the footsteps of Internazionale teammate Philippe Coutinho, who spent the final six months of the 2011–12 campaign at Estadi Cornellà-El Prat. On 2 September he made his debut abroad, scoring the first of a 2–3 away loss against Levante. Longo scored his second goal on the 16th, in a 3–3 home draw against Athletic Bilbao, but was later sent off due to his celebration.

Longo's third goal for the Catalans came on 17 November, but in a 1–2 away defeat against Valencia CF. He finished the season with 18 appearances, including 11 starts.

==== Loan to Verona ====
On 20 August 2013, Longo joined Verona, recently promoted to Serie A, in a season-long loan deal. However, he only appeared twice in the season (against Cagliari and Roma), all from the bench.

==== Loan to Rayo Vallecano ====
On 31 January 2014 Longo joined fellow top-divisioner Rayo Vallecano on loan until the end of the season.

==== Loan to Girona ====
On 16 July 2016, after another loan stints at Cagliari and Frosinone, Longo was loaned to Spanish Segunda División side Girona FC for one year. He made his debut on 21 August, a debut which brought his first goal of the season as well, in a 3–3 away draw against Sevilla Atlético, in the opening league match of 2016–17 season.

At the end of the 2016–17 season, Longo returned to Inter. He was part of the squad in the first day of pre-season training.

==== Loan to Tenerife ====
On 23 August 2017, Longo was sent on loan at fellow Segunda División side Tenerife for the 2017–18 season.

==== Loan to Huesca ====
On 5 July 2018, Longo was loaned to SD Huesca, newly promoted to La Liga, on a one-year deal with an obligation to make it permanent.

==== Loan to Cremonese ====
On 30 January 2019, Longo joined Serie B side Cremonese on loan until 30 June 2019 with an obligation to make the deal permanent if Cremonese won promotion to Serie A.

==== Loan to Deportivo La Coruña ====
On 16 August 2019, Longo joined Spanish side Deportivo La Coruña on loan until 30 June 2020 with an obligation to make the deal permanent if the club won promotion to La Liga.

==== Loan to Venezia ====
On 31 January 2020, Longo joined Serie B club Venezia on loan until 30 June 2020.

=== Vicenza ===
On 5 October 2020, he signed a three-year contract with Serie B club Vicenza.

==== Loan to Modena ====
On 31 January 2022, Longo joined Modena on loan with an option to buy and a conditional obligation to buy.

=== Dordrecht ===
On 3 August 2022, Longo moved to Dordrecht in the Netherlands.

=== Antequera ===
On 29 January 2025, Longo returned to Spain and signed with Antequera in the third tier until the end of the season, with an option to extend.

=== Xerez Deportivo ===
On 28 January 2026, Longo signed with Spanish fourth-tier club Xerez Deportivo.

== International career ==
Samuele Longo made his U20 debut on 31 August 2011 as a starting forward, the first match of coach Luigi Di Biagio. Longo scored the opening goal for Italy in the first round of the 2011–12 Four Nations. In the next match, he substituted Genoa team-mate Giacomo Beretta in the 65th minute. He also played the next match against Germany as sub for Manuel Fischnaller. In the fourth match Longo was the starting forward again. Rested for the fifth round, Longo returned to the squad as a substitute for Sansone in the sixth round against Germany again, and scored another goal.

In April 2012, Longo received his first U21 call-up. Ciro Ferrara made a more experimental squad without some U21 regulars. Inter team-mate Faraoni and Juventus player Marrone left the squad before the match as the match was overlapped with mid-week rescheduled week 33 of Serie A. It made the squad consist of 16 Serie B players and three Serie A players (but from the reserve) Longo, Viviani and De Sciglio, with the latter two received call-up only after the withdrawal of the two original Serie A members. Despite a more immature squad, Azzurrini won Scotland 4–1. Longo scored a goal as the substitute for Ciro Immobile. In June 2012, Ferrara dropped 7 players from the April squad (19+2), and added 9 new and old players to the squad. Longo, who had to play for the reserve, was dropped along with 3 other forwards.

Longo played 1 game in 2013 U21 Euro qualification (against Liechtenstein, 6 September 2012) and 7 games in 2015 U21 Euro qualification. He was included in 27-men preliminary squad for the final tournament. He was dropped on 7 June 2015.

== Career statistics ==
As of match played 5 January 2025

Appearances and goals by club, season and competition
Club	Season	League			Cup (Note: Includes Copa del Rey, Coppa Italia, KNVB Cup and Greek Cup)		Europe		Total	
Club	Season	Division	Apps	Goals	Apps	Goals	Apps	Goals	Apps	Goals
Inter Milan	2011–12	Serie A	1	0	0	0	0	0	1	0
Inter Milan	2012–13	Serie A	0	0	0	0	1 (Note: Appearance(s) in UEFA Europa League)	0	1	0
Inter Milan	Total		1	0	0	0	1	0	2	0
Espanyol (loan)	2012–13	La Liga	18	3	2	0	—		20	3
Hellas Verona (loan)	2013–14	Serie A	2	0	1	1	—		3	1
Rayo Vallecano (loan)	2013–14	La Liga	9	0	0	0	—		9	0
Cagliari (loan)	2014–15	Serie A	27	0	2	2	—		29	2
Frosinone (loan)	2015–16	Serie A	18	0	1	0	—		19	0
Girona (loan)	2016–17	Segunda División	34	14	1	0	—		35	14
Tenerife (loan)	2017–18	Segunda División	24	12	2	0	—		26	12
Huesca (loan)	2018–19	La Liga	15	1	2	0	—		17	1
Cremonese (loan)	2018–19	Serie B	4	0	0	0	—		4	0
Deportivo La Coruña (loan)	2019–20	Segunda División	13	0	2	1	—		15	1
Venezia (loan)	2019–20	Serie B	17	4	0	0	—		17	4
Vicenza	2020–21	Serie B	23	3	1	0	—		24	3
Vicenza	2021–22	Serie B	9	1	1	0	—		10	1
Vicenza	Total		32	4	2	0	0	0	34	4
Modena (loan)	2021–22	Serie C	10	0	0	0	—		10	0
Dordrecht	2022–23	Eerste Divisie	36	12	1	0	—		37	12
Lamia	2023–24	Super League Greece	11	1	1	0	—		12	1
Ponferradina	2023–24	Primera Federación	17	2	—		—		17	2
Milan Futuro	2024–25	Serie C	17	2	2	0	—		19	2
Career total			305	55	19	4	1	0	325	59

== Honours ==
Inter Primavera

- NextGen series: 2011–12
- Campionato Nazionale Primavera: 2011–12

Individual

- Best Player of playoffs: 2012
