= Mickey van der Hart =

Dutch footballer (born 1994)

Personal information
- Date of birth: 13 June 1994 (age 32)
- Place of birth: Amstelveen, Netherlands
- Height: 1.88 m (6 ft 2 in)
- Position: Goalkeeper

Team information
- Current team: Cape Town City

Youth career
- –2007: AFC
- 2007–2012: Ajax

Senior career*
Years	Team	Apps	(Gls)
2012–2015	Ajax	0	(0)
2013–2015	Jong Ajax	27	(0)
2014–2015	→ Go Ahead Eagles (loan)	22	(0)
2015–2019	Zwolle	82	(0)
2019–2022	Lech Poznań	65	(0)
2022–2023	Emmen	29	(0)
2023–2025	Heerenveen	31	(0)
2025–	Cape Town City	0	(0)

International career
2011–2012	Netherlands U18	2	(0)
2012–2013	Netherlands U19	6	(0)
2013–2016	Netherlands U21	13	(0)
- * Club domestic league appearances and goals as of 6 June 2025

Mickey van der Hart (born 13 June 1994) is a Dutch professional footballer who plays as a goalkeeper for South African club Cape Town City.

== Club career ==
=== Ajax ===
Acquired into the Ajax Youth Academy from local amateur side Amsterdamsche FC in 2007, Van der Hart worked his way up the youth ranks, and had an outstanding 2011–12 season with the Ajax A1 youth squad. That year, the under-20 team where he was first-choice keeper at the time, had won the national title (Nike Eredivisie), as well as finished as runners-up in that season's NextGen Series (the Champions League equivalent for youth teams) when they lost to Inter Milan on penalties. Van der Hart was awarded his first professional contract when he was pronounced as the first team's third-choice goalkeeper, as well as receiving the award for Talent van De Toekomst (Talent of the Future). His first contract was a three-year deal, binding him to the club until June 2015.

The 2012–13 season was Van der Hart's first with the Ajax first team since the departure of former third keeper Jeroen Verhoeven, however with then first- and second-choice keepers Kenneth Vermeer and Jasper Cillessen each having an injury-free season, Van der Hart was unable to make his debut for the first team, meanwhile still playing in the Ajax A1 youth squad, where he was still eligible to participate due to his young age. On 8 April 2013, an opportunity presented itself for Van der Hart to appear as second choice keeper behind Jasper Cillessen, following a red card suspension to Kenneth Vermeer. That void would however be filled by Chiel Kramer, first keeper of the reserves team Jong Ajax, since Van der Hart was sidelined due to a groin injury at the time. Ajax would eventually go on to win the national title in what would be Van der Hart's first season as a professional.

The 2013–14 season saw Van der Hart maintain his position as Frank de Boer's third choice behind Kenneth Vermeer and Jasper Cillessen, as the season opened with Ajax winning the Dutch Super Cup (Johan Cruijff Shield). Van der Hart made his professional debut on 9 August 2013 in the Eerste Divisie keeping for Jong Ajax, where he is still eligible to play, having made less than 15 appearances for Ajax first team in the Eredivisie. The match against Oss in which he played the full 90 minutes ended in a 2–0 loss for the Amsterdammers, in what would be only Jong Ajax second match ever in professional football, with the team having moved up from the Beloften Eredivisie before the start of the season.

=== Go Ahead Eagles (loan) ===
On 9 June 2014, it was announced that Van der Hart would serve a season-long loan spell with Go Ahead Eagles in Deventer, joining the likes of Nick de Bondt and Sven Nieuwpoort who had transferred to the club from Ajax during the same transfer window as well.

=== PEC Zwolle ===
On 14 August 2015, it was announced that Van der Hart had been sold to Eredivisie side Zwolle. He signed a one-year deal with the club, an extension option included.

=== Lech Poznań ===
On 21 May 2019, Van der Hart signed a three-year contract with Polish side Lech Poznań. He made his debut on 20 July 2019 against defending champions Piast Gliwice.

=== Emmen ===
On 24 August 2022, Van der Hart joined Emmen on a one-year contract.

=== Heerenveen ===
On 24 August 2023, Van der Hart signed a two-year contract with Heerenveen.

== International career ==
Van der Hart represented Netherlands U-18 and Netherlands U-19. On 11 November 2011, he made his debut for Netherlands U-18 in a friendly encounter against Romania U-18. On 7 September 2012, he made his debut for the under-19 team in a friendly match against Greece U-19. He was selected by head coach Wim van Zwam to participate in the 2013 UEFA European Under-19 Football Championship in Lithuania. He played in all the group matches, of which one was won, and two were lost, failing to advance past the group stage. On 2 August 2013, head coach of the Netherlands U-21 team Albert Stuivenberg selected Van der Hart for the 32-man provisional squad, ahead of the 2013 UEFA European Under-21 Football Championship. On 9 August 2013, however, it was announced that Van der Hart had not made the final 22-man squad selection for the tournament.

== Personal life ==
Van der Hart is the grandson of former Ajax central defender Cor van der Hart.

== Career statistics ==
As of match played 22 May 2025

Appearances and goals by club, season and competition
Club	Season	League			National cup (Note: Includes KNVB Cup, Polish Cup)		Continental		Other		Total	
Club	Season	Division	Apps	Goals	Apps	Goals	Apps	Goals	Apps	Goals	Apps	Goals
Jong Ajax	2013–14	Eerste Divisie	27	0	—		—		—		27	0
Ajax	2013–14	Eredivisie	0	0	1	0	0	0	0	0	1	0
Go Ahead Eagles (loan)	2014–15	Eredivisie	22	0	2	0	0	0	0	0	24	0
Zwolle	2015–16	Eredivisie	18	0	1	0	0	0	0	0	19	0
Zwolle	2016–17	Eredivisie	34	0	3	0	0	0	0	0	37	0
Zwolle	2017–18	Eredivisie	1	0	3	0	0	0	0	0	4	0
Zwolle	2018–19	Eredivisie	29	0	2	0	0	0	0	0	31	0
Zwolle	Total		82	0	9	0	0	0	0	0	91	0
Lech Poznań	2019–20	Ekstraklasa	34	0	5	0	—		—		39	0
Lech Poznań	2020–21	Ekstraklasa	15	0	0	0	0	0	—		15	0
Lech Poznań	2021–22	Ekstraklasa	16	0	3	0	—		—		19	0
Lech Poznań	Total		65	0	8	0	0	0	—		73	0
Emmen	2022–23	Eredivisie	25	0	3	0	—		4 (Note: Appearances in Eredivisie promotion/relegation play-offs)	0	32	0
Heerenveen	2023–24	Eredivisie	12	0	2	0	—		—		14	0
Heerenveen	2024–25	Eredivisie	19	0	2	0	—		1 (Note: Appearance in Eredivisie European play-offs)	0	22	0
Heerenveen	Total		31	0	4	0	—		1	0	36	0
Career total			252	0	27	0	0	0	5	0	284	0

== Honours ==
Ajax Youth

- Nike Eredivisie: 2011–12
- NextGen Series runner-up: 2011–12

Ajax

- Eredivisie: 2012–13, 2013–14
- Johan Cruijff Shield: 2013

Lech Poznań

- Ekstraklasa: 2021–22

Individual

- AFC Ajax Talent of the Future: 2012
