= Mitchell Dijks =

Dutch footballer (born 1993)

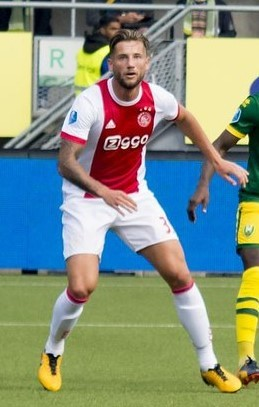
- Mitchell Dijks with Ajax in 2017

Personal information
- Full name: Mitchell Clement Dijks
- Date of birth: 9 February 1993 (age 33)
- Place of birth: Purmerend, Netherlands
- Height: 1.94 m (6 ft 4 in)
- Position: Left back

Team information
- Current team: Nam Định
- Number: 24

Youth career
- 2003–2009: Volendam
- 2009–2012: Ajax

Senior career*
Years	Team	Apps	(Gls)
2012–2014	Ajax	6	(0)
2013–2014	→ Heerenveen (loan)	24	(0)
2014–2015	Willem II	28	(0)
2015–2018	Ajax	50	(0)
2017	→ Norwich City (loan)	15	(1)
2017–2018	Jong Ajax	3	(0)
2018–2022	Bologna	74	(1)
2022–2023	Vitesse	7	(0)
2023–2025	Fortuna Sittard	56	(0)
2025–	Nam Định	0	(0)

International career
2009	Netherlands U16	1	(1)
2010–2011	Netherlands U18	6	(0)
2012	Netherlands U19	3	(0)
2012–2013	Netherlands U21	3	(0)
- * Club domestic league appearances and goals as of 10 June 2025

Mitchell Clement Dijks (Dutch pronunciation: [ˈmɪtɕəl ˈdɛiks]; born 9 February 1993) is a Dutch professional footballer who plays as a left back for V.League 1 club Nam Định.

== Club career ==
=== Ajax ===
Born in Purmerend, Dijks was recruited into the youth ranks of then AFC Ajax partner club FC Volendam in 2009. While playing for the Ajax A1 youth squad in 2011–12, Dijks helped his side to win the Nike Eredivisie league title, as well finishing as runners-up to Inter Milan in the NextGen Series (the Champions League equivalent for under-20 teams) after losing on penalties (5–3) following a 1–1 deadlock after extra time.

Dijks made his first team debut on 5 August 2012 against PSV in the Johan Cruyff Shield in which he played 76 minutes in before being subbed off for Dico Koppers and he also received a yellow card. Ajax lost the match 4–2. He then made his league debut with Ajax on 19 August 2012 against NEC, playing 79 minutes before being replaced by Joël Veltman. The match ended 6–1 in favor of Ajax. Dijks made a total of 6 league appearances playing in the left-back position. playing in a KNVB Cup match as well, all while helping Ajax to win the Eredivisie title in his debut season, making it the team's 32nd Dutch league title overall.

==== Heerenveen (loan) ====
For the 2013–14 Eredivisie season, Dijks signed on loan with fellow Dutch top-tier club SC Heerenveen. On 3 August 2013, in the season opener against AZ, he was sent off in his first match for his new club. He was ejected following a reckless tackle in the 71st minute of the match, which ended a 4–2 victory at the Abe Lenstra Stadion.

=== Willem II ===
On 28 August 2014, it was announced that Dijks had signed a two-year contract with Eredivisie side Willem II.

=== Return to Ajax ===
On 26 June 2015, Ajax announced they had re-signed Dijks from Willem II. As part of the deal Ajax youngsters Richairo Zivkovic, Ruben Ligeon and Lesly de Sa will head the other way on loan. On 30 January 2017, Dijks looked to join Norwich City FC on an initial loan deal.

==== Norwich City (loan) ====
In January 2017, having lost his position in the starting lineup to Daley Sinkgraven under newly appointed manager Peter Bosz, Dijks initially turned down a transfer option to play in the EFL Championship for Norwich City. He instead agreed upon a loan spell with the Canaries, which would last until the season ended. He scored his first professional goal on 7 February 2017 in a 2–2 away draw against Wigan Athletic with a powerful header in the 73rd minute.

==== Jong Ajax ====
Upon his return from Norwich City, Dijks originally trained with the first team, before it was decided that he would spend the rest of the season playing for Jong Ajax, the reserves team competing in the Dutch Eerste Divisie, the second tier of professional football in the Netherlands. Jong Ajax would go on to win the second division title that season with Dijks making 3 appearances in total.

=== Bologna ===
On 29 April 2018, it was announced that Dijks had signed a contract with Serie A team Bologna on a free transfer. He scored his first goal for the club on 12 August 2018 in a Coppa Italia match against Padova. He made his Serie A debut the following week in the home match against SPAL, and scored his first goal for the team on 8 April 2019, marking the final score in a 3–0 win over Chievo.

In the following season, after only five appearances, Dijks suffered an injury to the second toe of his right foot that would keep him sidelined for 5–6 months.

On 31 August 2022, his contract with Bologna was terminated by mutual consent.

=== Fortuna Sittard ===
On 18 July 2023, Dijks joined Fortuna Sittard on a one-year contract.

=== Nam Định ===
On 21 August 2025, Dijks joined Vietnamese club Nam Định.

== International career ==
=== Youth ===
Dijks has represented the Netherlands at under-18, under-19, and the under-21 level. He was selected in the final Dutch under-19 squad for the elite stage of the 2012 Euro U19 qualification. He started and played in the team's first match of the elite stage against Norway U19 and lasted the full 90 while he gained a yellow card in the 54th minute as the Dutch won 2–1. He then played in the Netherlands last match of qualifiers against France U19 coming on a substitute in the 20th minute for Mats van Huijgevoort. The match ended in disaster for Dijks and the Dutch as they lost 6–0 and thus lost out European U19 qualification. On 15 August 2012, Dijks made his debut for the Dutch under-21 team in a friendly against Italy U21, coming on as a 46th-minute substitute for Johan Kappelhof as the Dutch lost 3–0.

=== Senior ===
Dijks received his first call up to the senior Netherlands team in March 2016 for friendlies against France and England.

== Career statistics ==
As of match played 17 December 2024

Appearances and goals by club, season and competition
Club	Season	League			National cup (Note: Includes KNVB Cup, Coppa Italia, Vietnamese Cup)		Continental		Other		Total	
Club	Season	Division	Apps	Goals	Apps	Goals	Apps	Goals	Apps	Goals	Apps	Goals
Ajax	2012–13	Eredivisie	6	0	2	0	0	0	1 (Note: Appearance in Johan Cruyff Shield)	0	9	0
Heerenveen (loan)	2013–14	Eredivisie	24	0	3	0	—		0	0	27	0
Willem II	2014–15	Eredivisie	28	0	0	0	—		—		28	0
Ajax	2015–16	Eredivisie	29	0	1	0	9 (Note: Two appearances in UEFA Champions League, seven appearances in UEFA Europa League)	0	—		39	0
Ajax	2016–17	Eredivisie	12	0	2	0	6 (Note: Three appearances in UEFA Champions League, three appearances in UEFA Europa League)	0	—		20	0
Ajax	2017–18	Eredivisie	9	0	1	0	2 (Note: Appearances in UEFA Europa League)	0	—		12	0
Ajax	Total		50	0	4	0	17	0	0	0	71	0
Norwich City (loan)	2016–17	Championship	15	1	0	0	0	0	0	0	15	1
Jong Ajax	2017–18	Eerste Divisie	3	0	—		—		—		3	0
Bologna	2018–19	Serie A	25	1	3	1	—		—		28	2
Bologna	2019–20	Serie A	13	0	1	0	—		—		14	0
Bologna	2020–21	Serie A	20	0	0	0	—		—		20	0
Bologna	2021–22	Serie A	16	0	0	0	—		—		16	0
Bologna	Total		74	1	4	1	—		—		78	2
Vitesse	2022–23	Eredivisie	7	0	0	0	—		—		7	0
Fortuna Sittard	2023–24	Eredivisie	31	0	3	0	—		—		34	0
Fortuna Sittard	2024–25	Eredivisie	12	0	2	0	—		—		14	0
Fortuna Sittard	Total		43	0	5	0	—		—		48	0
Nam Định	2025–26	V.League 1	0	0	0	0	0	0	0	0	0	0
Career total			250	2	18	1	17	0	1	0	286	3

== Honours ==
Ajax U19

- U19 Eredivisie: 2011–12
- NextGen Series Runner-up: 2011–12

Ajax

- Eredivisie: 2012–13
