= Rodrigo Alborno =

Paraguayan footballer (born 1993)

Personal information
- Full name: Rodrigo Alborno Ortega
- Date of birth: 12 August 1993 (age 33)
- Place of birth: Asunción, Paraguay
- Height: 1.83 m (6 ft 0 in)
- Positions: Left back; left winger

Team information
- Current team: Chadormalou
- Number: 6

Youth career
- 1999–2007: Atlántida
- 2007–2009: Libertad

Senior career*
Years	Team	Apps	(Gls)
2010–2011	Libertad	20	(2)
2011–2016	Inter Milan	0	(0)
2012–2013	→ Novara (loan)	3	(0)
2013–2014	→ Cittadella (loan)	26	(2)
2016–2018	Libertad	12	(1)
2017	→ Deportivo Capiatá (loan)	15	(1)
2019	Guaraní	2	(0)
2020–2021	River Plate	15	(1)
2021	Guaireña	25	(2)
2022	12 de Octubre	6	(0)
2022	Sol de America	15	(0)
2023	Guaireña	17	(1)
2023–2026	Sportivo Luqueño	36	(2)
2026–	Chadormalou	3	(0)

International career
2012–2013	Paraguay U20	8	(1)
- * Club domestic league appearances and goals as of 13 August 2025

Rodrigo Alborno Ortega (born 12 August 1993) is a Paraguayan footballer who plays as a left back or left winger for Chadormalou.

== Club career ==
Born in Asunción, Alborno started his career with local giants Libertad, joining the club's youth setup in 2007, aged 13. Three years later he was promoted to the first-team squad, and played his first match as a professional on 30 January 2010, starting in a 0–1 loss at Guaraní; roughly a month later he scored his first senior goal, netting his side's only in a 1–1 draw at Sportivo Trinidense.

In April 2011 Alborno agreed a five-year deal with Italian Serie A side Internazionale, with the deal being effective only in August. Initially assigned to the reserve squad, he appeared regularly during the NextGen series winning campaign.

On 14 July 2012 Alborno was loaned to Novara with a co-ownership clause at the end of the season; A year later he moved to Cittadella, also on loan.

== Honours ==
- NextGen series: 2012 (Inter Primavera)
- Campionato Nazionale Primavera: 2012 (Inter Primavera)
