= Simone Pecorini =

Italian footballer

Personal information
- Date of birth: 12 January 1993 (age 33)
- Place of birth: Milan, Italy
- Height: 1.90 m (6 ft 3 in)
- Positions: Right-back; midfielder

Team information
- Current team: Sant'Angelo

Youth career
- 2002–2012: Internazionale
- 2010–2011: → Sassuolo (loan)

Senior career*
Years	Team	Apps	(Gls)
2010–2013	Internazionale	0	(0)
2010–2011	→ Sassuolo (loan)	1	(0)
2012	→ Empoli (loan)	3	(0)
2013	→ Cittadella (loan)	0	(0)
2013–2015	Cittadella	47	(1)
2015–2017	Ascoli	28	(1)
2017	Virtus Entella	7	(0)
2017–2018	Avellino	9	(0)
2019	Cuneo	7	(0)
2019–2020	Monopoli	14	(0)
2020–2022	Pro Sesto	63	(6)
2022–2023	Lecco	8	(0)
2023–	Sant'Angelo	0	(0)

International career
2009	Italy U16	4	(0)
2009	Italy U17	4	(0)
2010–2011	Italy U18	3	(0)
2011–2012	Italy U19	8	(1)
2012–2014	Italy U20	8	(0)
- * Club domestic league appearances and goals as of 14 July 2023

Simone Pecorini (born 12 January 1993) is an Italian footballer who plays for Serie D club Sant'Angelo.

== Club career ==
Born in Milan, Lombardy, Simone, along with his twin brother Gabriele, both started their careers at Internazionale. They were members of the Pulcini B youth team (U10) in the 2002–03 season. Simone remained in the youth system until 2010, while Gabriele left for Monza on a temporary deal in 2008 and did not become a professional player after becoming a free agent in 2009. While Simone Pecorini graduated from the U17 team in 2010 and left for the reserve of Sassuolo along with Diego Mella, as there was no room for them in Inter U19 reserve partially due to their young age. He also played once for the first team on 27 March 2011 against Siena.

Pecorini returned to the Inter U19 team "Primavera" in June 2011 after Inter exercised the counter-option to buy back Pecorini from Sassuolo. Under Andrea Stramaccioni, Pecorini won 2011–12 NextGen Series and also transformed into right-back from wide midfielder. However, due to insulting the referee, he was banned for 9 months, until 31 December 2012. Despite shortened to 6 months ban, he missed the reserve league final and as worse as 2012 UEFA European Under-19 Football Championship elite qualification.

On 10 July 2012, Pecorini was loaned to Serie B club Empoli F.C.

=== Cittadella ===
In January 2013 Pecorini was signed by Cittadella in a temporary deal. In July 2013 he was signed on a co-ownership basis, for a peppercorn. In June 2014 Pecorini was acquired by Cittadella outright as part of the bought back of Cristiano Biraghi.

=== Ascoli ===
Pecorini was signed by Ascoli on 6 July 2015.

=== Entella and Avellino ===
On 31 January 2017 Pecorini was signed by Virtus Entella.

In summer 2017 he was signed by Avellino as a free agent.

=== Cuneo ===
On 31 January 2019, he signed with Cuneo.

=== Monopoli ===
On 7 August 2019, he signed a one-year contract with an additional one-year extension option with Monopoli.

=== Pro Sesto ===
On 19 August 2020, he joined Pro Sesto, freshly promoted into Serie C.

=== Lecco ===
On 5 July 2022, Pecorini signed with Lecco.

=== Serie D ===
On 4 July 2023, Pecorini joined Sant'Angelo in Serie D.

=== International career ===
Pecorini was a member of the Italy U16 team in the 2008–09 season. In August 2009, he received a call-up from the U17 for a friendly tournament, and at least played the game against England national under-17 football team. Pecorini was a member of U-18 and U-19 team also.

Despite did not play any game yet in club level since the expire of the ban, he received his first U20 call-up in October 2012 against Germany to replace not available Francesco Zampano, who later re-joined the squad against Iran in the same month. Pecorini replaced Riccardo Fiamozzi at half-time against Germany. Pecorini received another call-up as a replacement (along with Cristiano Piccini) due to the withdrawal of Fiamozzi and Cristiano Biraghi in November.

== Honours ==
Inter Primavera

- NextGen series (1): 2011–12
- League Champion (1): 2011–12
