= Marek Kysela =

Czech soccer player

Personal information
- Date of birth: 10 July 1992 (age 34)
- Place of birth: Rokycany, Czechoslovakia
- Height: 1.90 m (6 ft 3 in)
- Position: Defender

Team information
- Current team: Sokol Držkov

Youth career
- –2008: Viktoria Plzeň
- 2008–2012: Inter Milan

Senior career*
Years	Team	Apps	(Gls)
2012–2018	Jablonec	73	(4)
2019–2020	SV Donaustauf	9	(0)
2020–	Sokol Držkov		

International career^{‡}
2012–2013	Czech Republic U21	4	(0)
- * Club domestic league appearances and goals as of 30 August 2019 ‡ National team caps and goals as of 3 June 2014

Marek Kysela (born 10 July 1992) is a professional Czech football defender who plays for Sokol Držkov.

== Club career ==
Coming from Viktoria Plzeň youth system, he signed a professional contract with Inter Milan in 2008. During his 4-year spell in Milan, he failed to make a league appearance for the senior team. In 2012, he returned to Czech Republic, signing with Jablonec.

=== Medical problems and later career ===
In April 2016, during a match, Kysela was hit inadvertently in the head with a knee. A follow-up examination at the hospital showed that he had a brain tumor, which was discovered only in time due to this collision. Three months after his operation, Kysela started individual training. However, he began to have epileptic seizures:

- It started one evening when I was driving in Prague. Suddenly my right eye began to flicker. I stopped, I took my legs out of the car and I don't remember the next two hours. When I regained consciousness, I found that I was only running in a T-shirt by the train tracks. I was covered in mud and wet. People looked at me like they were crazy, they probably thought I was a junkie. I found a gas station, which I stopped at. No one had tried to help me in all this time. When I saw myself in the mirror, I wasn't even surprised. I had a bitten lip and I looked pretty bad.

Kysela later returned to football. But on 27 May 27 2017, during a match, Kysela got a strong stinging feeling on the right side of his chest and breathing problems. After the game, Kysela couldn't breathe any longer, and he was driven away in the ambulance. The doctors discovered that his lungs had ruptured spontaneously. He underwent many examinations, which, in consultation with doctors and the management of the club, led in 2018 to a difficult decision to end his professional football career. He traded the course for work in his own bar.

In the summer 2019, Kysela moved to Germany to play for Bayernliga Süd club SV Donaustauf. After a short spell in Germany, Kysela returned to the Czech Republic in 2020 to join TJ Sokol Držkov.

== Honours ==
Inter Primavera

- NextGen series (1): 2011–12
- League Champion (1): 2011–12
