= Mike Busse =

Dutch footballer (born 1993)

Personal information
- Date of birth: 9 February 1993 (age 33)
- Place of birth: Woerden, Netherlands
- Height: 1.83 m (6 ft 0 in)
- Position: Right back

Team information
- Current team: SCH '44

Youth career
- VEP
- Alphense Boys
- Ajax

Senior career*
Years	Team	Apps	(Gls)
2013–2015	Almere City	15	(1)
2015	Cambuur	0	(0)
2016	DTS Ede		
2016–2017	TEC	1	(0)
2017–2020	Aarlanderveen		
2020–2021	ARC	0	(0)
2021–	SCH '44		
- * Club domestic league appearances and goals as of 22 May 2021

Mike Busse (born 9 February 1993) is a Dutch footballer who plays as a right back for SCH '44.

== Club career ==
He formerly played for Almere City and joined Cambuur in summer 2015. After not making the grade in professional football, Busse played for Aarlanderveen and ARC and he joined fellow amateur side SCH '44 in 2021.
