= Yener Arıca =

Turkish-Dutch footballer (born 1992)

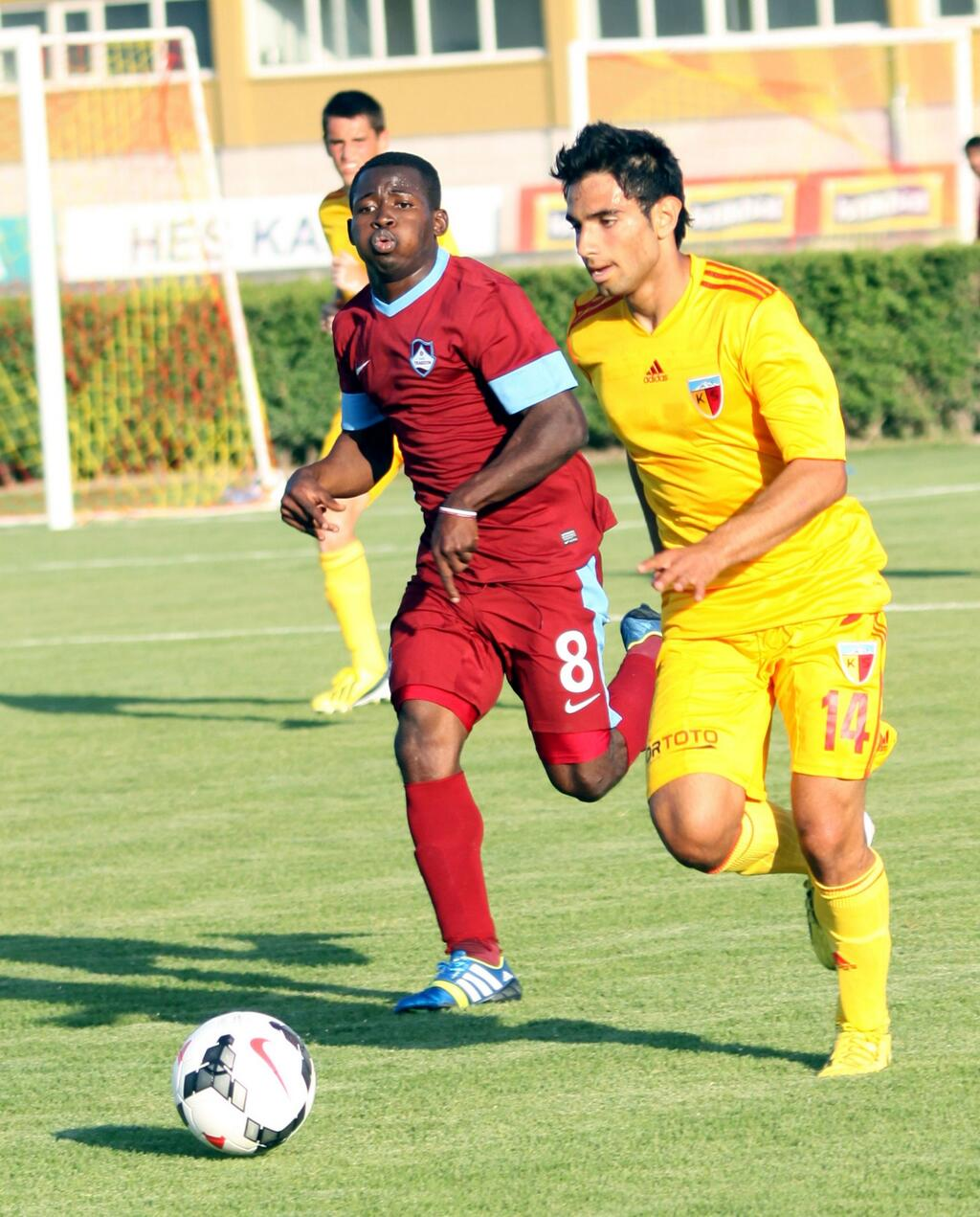
- Yener Arıca (right) with Torric Jebrin in 2013

Personal information
- Full name: Bilal Yener Arıca
- Date of birth: 28 February 1992 (age 34)
- Place of birth: Küçükçekmece, Turkey
- Height: 1.74 m (5 ft 9 in)
- Position: Attacking midfielder

Team information
- Current team: Bayburt Özel İdarespor
- Number: 20

Youth career
- 2003–2013: Ajax

Senior career*
Years	Team	Apps	(Gls)
2013–2015	Kayserispor	21	(1)
2015–2016	Altınordu SK	12	(1)
2016–2017	Almere City	27	(6)
2017–2019	Adanaspor	26	(2)
2020–	Bayburt Özel İdarespor	4	(1)
- * Club domestic league appearances and goals as of 11:28, 28 October 2020 (UTC)

Bilal Yener Arıca (born 28 February 1992) is a Turkish-Dutch footballer who plays as a midfielder for Bayburt Özel İdarespor.

== Club career ==
Born 28 February 1992 in Istanbul, Turkey, Yener Arıca moved to The Hague, in the Netherlands with his family, where he grew up. He attended the famous Ajax Academy in Amsterdam debuting for the D2 youth team in 2003. He has been on the reserve squad for AFC Ajax since 2011, and after two seasons on the reserves list he was however unable to break through into the first team, and decided to move to Turkey, signing with Kayserispor where he was given the number 14 shirt.

He made his Süper Lig debut for Kayserispor against Karabükspor in the 3–1 away loss, coming on as a 53' minute substitute for Salih Dursun.

After a season at Turkish second division Altınordu SK, he returned to Holland in summer 2016 to join Almere City.

== Personal life ==
Yener Arıca was born in Küçükçekmece, Istanbul, Turkey to both Turkish parents, with whom he moved to the Netherlands where he grew up. He holds both Turkish and Dutch citizenship, and has yet to make any appearances for either national team.
