= Jonathan Santiago =

French footballer (born 1994)

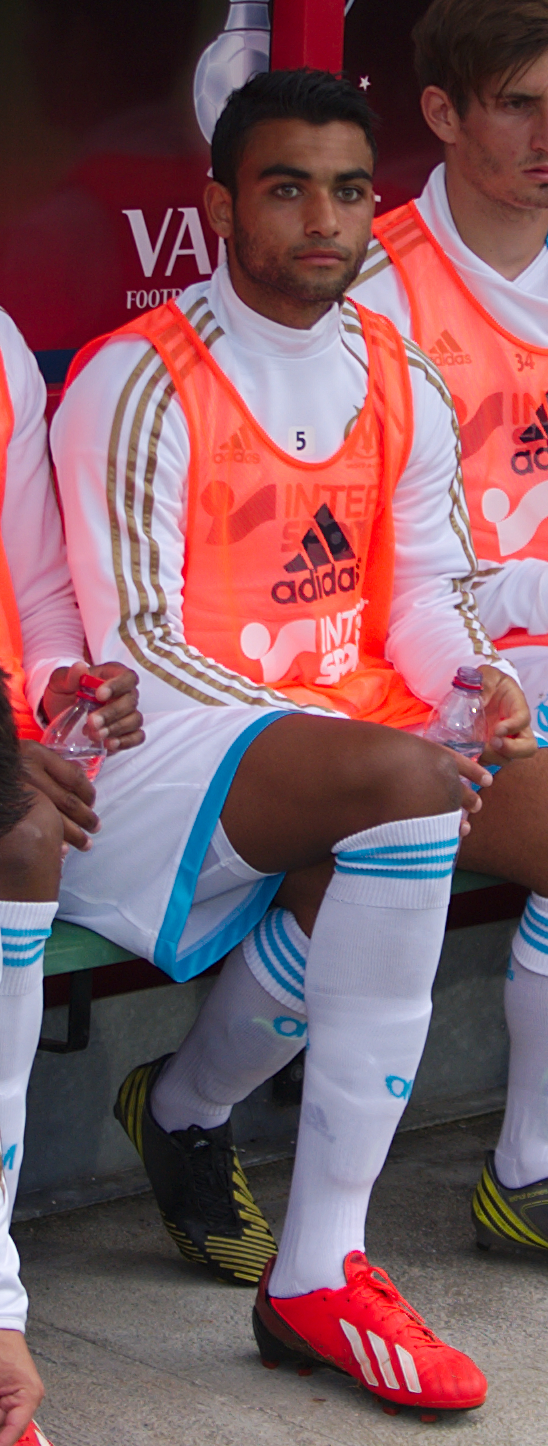
- Santiago in 2013

Personal information
- Full name: Jonathan Santiago
- Date of birth: 9 June 1994 (age 32)
- Place of birth: Marseille, France
- Height: 1.63 m (5 ft 4 in)
- Position: Midfielder

Youth career
- –2012: Marseille

Senior career*
Years	Team	Apps	(Gls)
2012–2015	Marseille	0	(0)
2012–2015	Marseille B	28	(1)
2015–2017	Montceau Bourgogne	32	(2)
2017–2018	Aubagne	4	(0)
2018	Lusitanos	14	(2)
- * Club domestic league appearances and goals as of 23:11, 11 March 2020 (UTC)

Jonathan Santiago (born 9 June 1994) is a French professional footballer who plays as a midfielder.

== Club career ==
Born in Marseille, Santiago made his professional debut with Olympique de Marseille on 6 December 2012 in the 2012–13 Europa League against Cypriot side AEL Limassol in a 3–0 loss. He came on as a substitute for Billel Omrani in the 63rd minute.
