= Chiel Kramer =

Dutch footballer (born 1992)

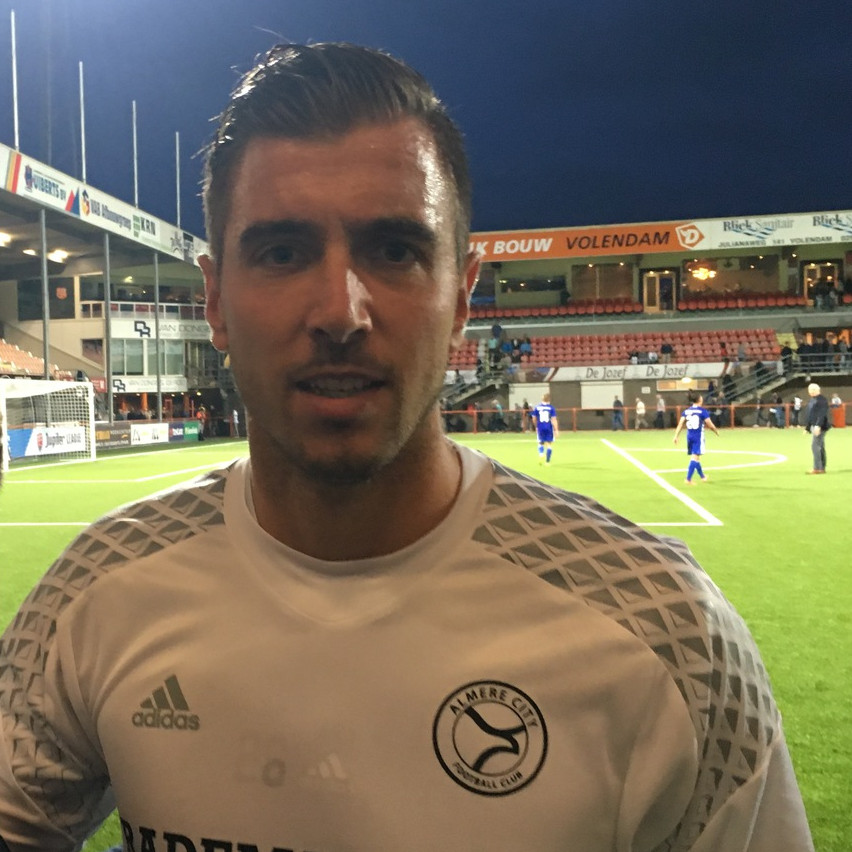
- Kramer in 2016

Personal information
- Date of birth: 3 January 1992 (age 34)
- Place of birth: Amsterdam, Netherlands
- Height: 1.95 m (6 ft 5 in)
- Positions: Goalkeeper; forward

Team information
- Current team: ODIN '59

Youth career
- –2002: ODIN '59
- 2002–2007: Haarlem
- 2007–2012: Ajax

Senior career*
Years	Team	Apps	(Gls)
2012–2013	Ajax	0	(0)
2013–2014	Heerenveen	0	(0)
2014–2016	FC Eindhoven	2	(0)
2016–2019	Almere City	75	(0)
2019–2021	NAC Breda	0	(0)
2021–	ODIN '59		
- * Club domestic league appearances and goals

Chiel Kramer (born 3 January 1992) is a Dutch footballer who plays as a forward for Hoofdklasse club ODIN '59. He is a former professional goalkeeper.

== Career ==
=== Ajax ===
Acquired by Ajax in 2007 as a free transfer from then partner club HFC Haarlem, Kramer worked his way up from the youth ranks of the Amsterdam club, Ajax then signed the young goalkeeper to a one-year contract on 1 July 2012. Kramer started the 2012–13 keeping for Jong Ajax, the Amsterdam reserve squad, playing in the Beloften Eredivisie. He was then called up to play for the first team on 8 April 2013, following a red card suspension to Ajax first keeper Kenneth Vermeer against Heracles Almelo a day prior to the announcement. With Vermeer suspended, Jasper Cillessen was the next goalkeeper in line, but with then third keeper Mickey van der Hart sidelined due to an injury, Kramer found himself on the bench as Ajax back-up keeper, for the duration of Vermeer's suspension. He was given the number 45 shirt while appearing for Ajax first team, a year in which Ajax would win their third consecutive national title, and 32nd overall.

=== Heerenveen ===
On 6 June 2013, it was announced that Kramer had signed a one-year contract with Heerenveen, becoming the Friesian club's third choice keeper for the 2013–14 Eredivisie season.

=== FC Eindhoven ===
On 10 July 2014, Kramer signed a three-year deal with Eerste Divisie side FC Eindhoven. He made his professional debut on 23 September 2014, during a KNVB Cup match against VVV-Venlo. Kramer made his league debut in the Eerste Divisie on 1 May 2015 in a match against Jong FC Twente. During two years at Eindhoven, he made three appearances for the first team.

=== Almere City ===
Kramer signed a one-year contract with Almere City in June 2016, with an option for another season. He made his debut for the club on 5 August 2016 in a 1–1 draw against FC Volendam.

=== NAC Breda ===
In July 2019, Kramer joined NAC Breda where he signed a one-year contract to become backup goalkeeper behind Nick Olij. He signed a contract extension until 2021 with NAC the following year. He only made one appearance during his two years at the club; on 26 October 2020 in a 6–0 loss in the KNVB Cup to Go Ahead Eagles.

=== Later career ===
He retired from professional football in 2021, and returned to his childhood club ODIN '59 where he transitioned into a forward.

== Honours ==
Ajax

- Eredivisie: 2012–13
