= Miguel Ángel (footballer, born 1993) =

Spanish footballer

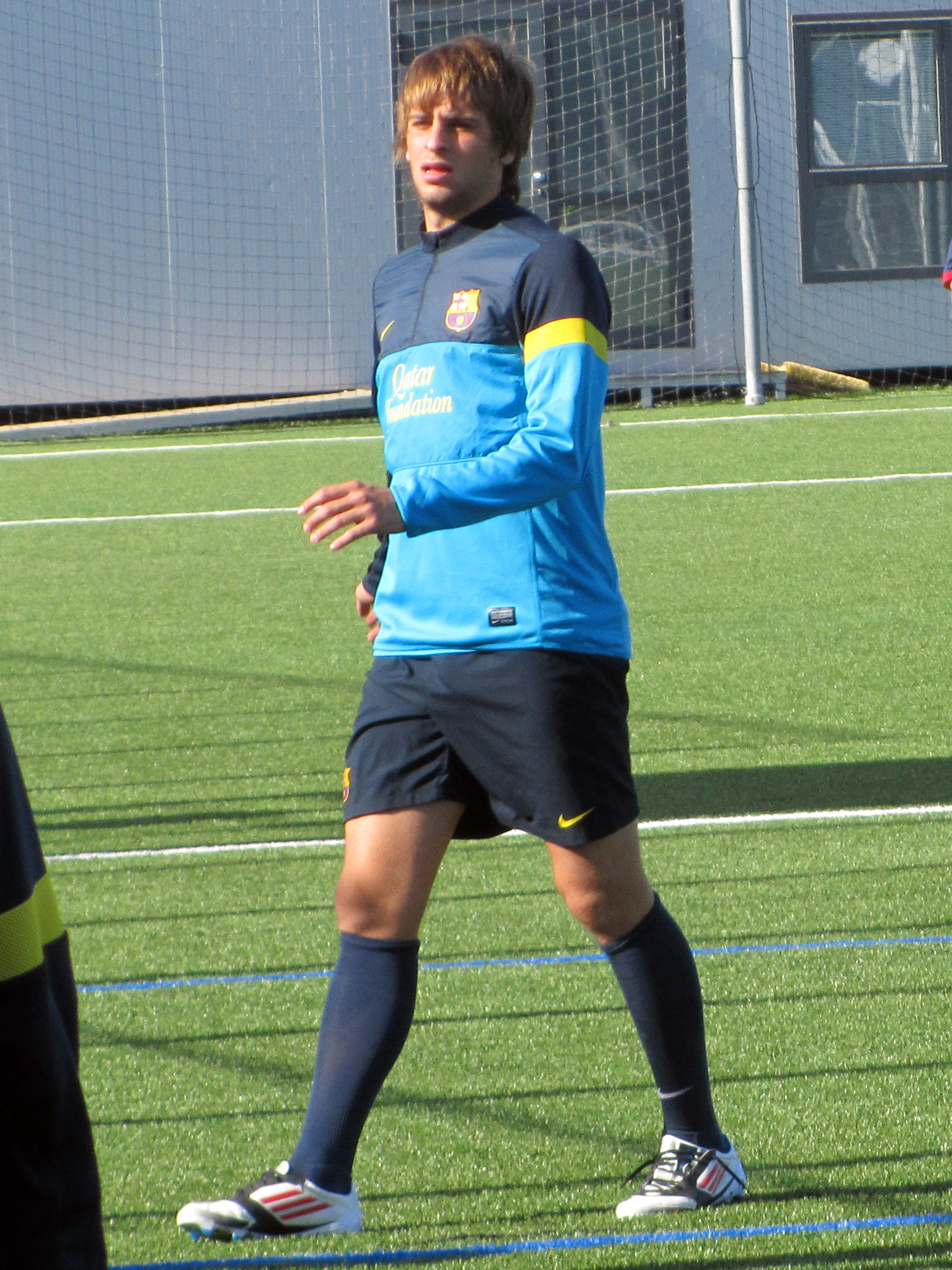

Personal information
- Full name: Miguel Ángel Sainz-Maza López
- Date of birth: 6 January 1993 (age 33)
- Place of birth: Santoña, Spain
- Height: 1.83 m (6 ft 0 in)
- Position: Winger

Team information
- Current team: Manfredonia
- Number: 6

Youth career
- 1998–2003: Meruelo
- 2003–2011: Racing Santander
- 2011–2012: Barcelona

Senior career*
Years	Team	Apps	(Gls)
2012–2013	Barcelona B	1	(0)
2013	→ Betis B (loan)	8	(0)
2013–2014	Reggina	10	(0)
2014–2018	Foggia	79	(11)
2017	→ Pordenone (loan)	17	(3)
2018	→ Pisa (loan)	16	(0)
2018–2019	Sicula Leonzio	20	(1)
2019–2020	Cavese	44	(4)
2020–2022	Gubbio	63	(8)
2022–2026	Audace Cerignola	78	(4)
2026–	Varesina	12	(0)
- * Club domestic league appearances and goals as of 2 August 2026

Miguel Ángel Sainz-Maza López (born 6 January 1993), commonly known as Miguel Ángel, is a Spanish professional footballer who plays as a left winger for Italian Serie D club Varesina.

== Club career ==
Born in Santoña, Cantabria, Miguel Ángel joined local giants Racing de Santander's youth system in 2003, aged 10. In 2011, after impressing with the Cantabrians Juvenil squad, he moved to FC Barcelona.

On 20 June 2012 Miguel Ángel was promoted to the Catalans' reserve squad, and played his first match as a professional on 13 October, coming on as a late substitute in a 3–0 home success over Sporting de Gijón in the Segunda División.

On 10 January of the following year Miguel Ángel joined Real Betis B on loan until the end of the season. After only starting once with the Andalusians (which eventually suffered relegation), he returned to Barça, and eventually rescinded his link, joining Italian Serie B side Reggina Calcio.

After appearing in only ten matches with the Amaranto during the campaign, Miguel Ángel signed a two-year deal with Lega Pro club Foggia Calcio on 6 August 2014. On 26 July 2017, he joined Pordenone Calcio on loan.

On 31 January 2019, he signed a one-and-a-half-year contract with another Serie C club, Cavese. Just three days later, in his first game for Cavese, he came on as a substitute against his previous club Sicula Leonzio and scored a winning penalty kick in a 3–2 victory.

On 22 August 2020 he went to Gubbio.

On 3 August 2022, he moved to Audace Cerignola.
