= Marvin Kleihs =

German footballer

Personal information
- Date of birth: 19 March 1994 (age 32)
- Place of birth: Stendal, Germany
- Height: 1.78 m (5 ft 10 in)
- Positions: Right-back; left-back

Team information
- Current team: Tennis Borussia Berlin
- Number: 13

Youth career
- –2006: TuS Schwarz-Weiß Bismark
- 2006–2013: VfL Wolfsburg

Senior career*
| Years | Team | Apps | (Gls) |
| 2013–2017 | VfL Wolfsburg II | 89 | (4) |
| 2017–2018 | Würzburger Kickers | 3 | (0) |
| 2018 | Weiche Flensburg 08 | 13 | (0) |
| 2018–2019 | Berliner AK | 4 | (0) |
| 2019–2023 | BFC Dynamo | 64 | (5) |
| 2023– | Tennis Borussia Berlin | 22 | (1) |
- * Club domestic league appearances and goals as of 8 June 2024

Marvin Kleihs (born 19 March 1994) is a German footballer who plays as a right-back or left-back for NOFV-Oberliga Nord club Tennis Borussia Berlin.
