= Nick de Bondt =

Dutch footballer (born 1994)

Personal information
- Date of birth: 21 April 1994 (age 32)
- Place of birth: Ede, Netherlands
- Height: 1.79 m (5 ft 10 in)
- Positions: Left winger; left-back

Team information
- Current team: DOVO
- Number: 35

Youth career
- –2008: SV Otterlo
- 2008–2011: Vitesse/AGOVV
- 2011–2013: Ajax

Senior career*
Years	Team	Apps	(Gls)
2013–2014	Ajax	0	(0)
2013–2014	→ Jong Ajax	16	(0)
2014–2016	Go Ahead Eagles	8	(0)
2016	→ Dordrecht (loan)	10	(0)
2016–2018	De Treffers	66	(19)
2018–2019	Spakenburg	13	(0)
2019	→ DUNO (loan)	8	(2)
2019–2020	HHC Hardenberg	22	(3)
2020–	DOVO	115	(5)

International career
2011–2012	Netherlands U17	8	(0)
2011–2012	Netherlands U18	2	(0)
2012–2013	Netherlands U19	7	(2)
Medal record
Men's football
Representing Netherlands
UEFA European Under-17 Championship
Winner	2011 Serbia
- * Club domestic league appearances and goals as of 11 January 2026

Nick de Bondt (born 21 April 1994) is a Dutch professional footballer who plays as a winger for Derde Divisie club DOVO.

== Career ==
=== Early career ===
Born and raised in Ede, Netherlands, de Bondt began his football career playing for the youth ranks of local amateur side SV Otterlo. In 2008, he joined the youth ranks of nearby Vitesse/AGOVV, the joint youth team of both Vitesse Arnhem and AGOVV Apeldoorn, where he remained for the next three seasons.

=== Ajax ===
On 8 June 2011, Ajax announced that they had signed the young left footed winger from Gelderland to a three-year contract, which bound him to the Amsterdam club until 30 June 2014. During his first season with Ajax, de Bondt joined the Ajax A1 youth selection. While playing for the Ajax A1 youth squad in 2011–12, de Bondt helped his side to win the Nike Eredivisie league title, as well as finishing as runners-up to Inter Milan in the NextGen Series (the Champions League equivalent for under-20 teams) after losing on penalties (5–3) following a 1–1 deadlock after extra time.

After playing for the Ajax A1 selection for his first two seasons with Ajax, de Bondt joined Ajax reserves' team Jong Ajax for the 2013–14 season. Jong Ajax had recently been promoted from the Beloften Eredivisie, and were now competing in the Dutch Eerste Divisie, the 2nd tier of professional football in the Netherlands. Having been sidelined due to an injury, de Bondt did not make his professional debut until matchday 11, where he substituted in for Boban Lazić in the 74' minute, in the 3–1 away loss to SBV Excelsior in Rotterdam.

=== Go Ahead Eagles ===
On 30 April 2014, Go Ahead Eagles announced that de Bondt would join the club from Deventer as a free transfer. De Bondt signed a two-year contract with an option for an additional year.

De Bondt left Go Ahead in summer 2016 for Tweede Divisie side De Treffers.

=== VV DUNO ===
On 31 January 2019, SV Spakenburg loaned out de Bondt to VV DUNO for the rest of the season.

== International career ==
De Bondt made his debut playing for the Netherlands national team on 8 February 2011 playing for the Netherlands U-17 in a friendly match against Greece U-17 which ended in a 1–0 win for the Dutch. He helped the Netherlands U-17 qualify for the 2011 UEFA European Under-17 Football Championship in Serbia, appearing in 1 match during the qualification process of the tournament which the Dutch were able to win defeating Germany U-17 5–2 in the final. De Bondt appeared in every match during the tournament to help his side secure the European Championship. On 10 September 2012, de Bondt made his debut for the Netherlands U-19 in a friendly match against Scotland U-19 which resulted in a 2–1 victory for the Netherlands. He scored his first goal for the Netherlands U-19 in a 2013 UEFA European Under-19 Championship qualification match against Poland U-19 at home. He then followed up by scoring his second goal for Netherlands U-19 in the same match, which ended in a 3–1 win for the Netherlands.

== Career statistics ==
=== Club performance ===
As of 2014-05-01

Club performance			League		Cup		Continental^{1}		Other^{2}		Total	
Season	Club	League	Apps	Goals	Apps	Goals	Apps	Goals	Apps	Goals	Apps	Goals
Netherlands			League		KNVB Cup		Europe		Other		Total	
2013–14	Jong Ajax	Eerste Divisie	16	0	-	-	-	-	-	-	16	0
2014–15	Go Ahead Eagles	Eredivisie	0	0	-	-	-	-	-	-	0	0
Total	Netherlands		16	0	0	0	0	0	0	0	16	0
Career total			16	0	0	0	0	0	0	0	16	0

^{1} Includes UEFA Champions League and UEFA Europa League matches.

^{2} Includes Johan Cruijff Shield and Play-off matches.

== Honours ==
=== Club ===
Ajax A1 (under-19)

- Nike Eredivisie (1): 2011–12
- NextGen Series Runner-up: 2011–12

=== International ===
Netherlands under-17

- UEFA European Under-17 Championship (1): 2011
