= Giovanni Terrani =

Italian footballer

Personal information
- Date of birth: 12 October 1994 (age 32)
- Place of birth: Vigevano, Italy
- Height: 1.80 m (5 ft 11 in)
- Position: Forward

Team information
- Current team: Pro Patria
- Number: 31

Youth career
- –2013: Inter Milan

Senior career*
Years	Team	Apps	(Gls)
2013–2015	Monza	15	(1)
2014–2015	→ Pro Patria (loan)	26	(3)
2015–2017	Lucchese	52	(12)
2017–2019	Perugia	49	(2)
2019	Piacenza	18	(4)
2019–2021	Bari	26	(2)
2020–2021	→ Como (loan)	32	(4)
2021–2023	Padova	21	(2)
2023–2024	Trento	32	(1)
2024–	Pro Patria	17	(1)

International career
2011–2012	Italy U-18	4	(0)
- * Club domestic league appearances and goals as of 13 December 2024

Giovanni Terrani (born 12 October 1994) is an Italian football player who plays as a forward for Serie D club Pro Patria.

== Club career ==
He made his professional debut in the Lega Pro for Pro Patria on 30 August 2014 in a game against Torres.

On 14 January 2019, he signed with Serie C club Piacenza.

On 14 July 2019, he signed a 3-year contract with Bari. On 18 September 2020, he was loaned to Como.

On 31 August 2021, he moved to Padova.

On 28 January 2023, Terrani signed a 2.5-year contract with Trento.
