= Youssef Fennich =

Dutch association football player

Personal information
- Date of birth: 12 February 1993 (age 33)
- Place of birth: Amsterdam, Netherlands
- Position: Midfielder

Senior career*
Years	Team	Apps	(Gls)
-2012	Ajax	0	(0)
2012-2013	Heerenveen	0	(0)
2013-2014	PEC Zwolle	1	(0)
2014-2015	Inter Baku	0	(0)
2017-2018	CR Al-Hoceima	2	(2)
2018-2019	MC Oujda		

International career
2009–2010	Netherlands U17	5	(0)
- * Club domestic league appearances and goals

Youssef Fennich (born 12 February 1993 in the Netherlands) is a Dutch retired footballer.

== Club career ==
In 2011/12, Fennich won the youth league and reached the finals of the youth cup as well as that year's NextGen Series with Ajax, the most successful team in the Netherlands.

In 2012, he joined fellow Dutch side SC Heerenveen, where he failed to make an appearance.

After making one appearance with PEC Zwolle in the Dutch top flight, Fennich signed for Azerbaijani outfit Inter Baku, where he again failed to make an appearance.

In 2017, he signed for Moroccan club Chabab Rif Al Hoceima before sealing a move to Mouloudia Oujda in the same country the following season.

== International career ==
Fennich played 5 games for the Netherlands national under-17 football team.
