= Sven Nieuwpoort =

Dutch footballer

Personal information
- Date of birth: 13 April 1993 (age 33)
- Place of birth: Den Helder, Netherlands
- Height: 1.88 m (6 ft 2 in)
- Positions: Right back; centre back

Youth career
- 2003–2013: Ajax

Senior career*
Years	Team	Apps	(Gls)
2013–2014	Ajax	0	(0)
2013	→ Almere City (loan)	15	(0)
2013	Jong Ajax	3	(0)
2013–2014	→ Almere City (loan)	31	(2)
2014–2016	Go Ahead Eagles	45	(1)
2016–2019	De Graafschap	82	(1)
2019–2021	Cambuur	14	(1)
2021–2024	Excelsior	78	(1)

International career
2011–2012	Netherlands U19	6	(0)
- * Club domestic league appearances and goals

Sven Nieuwpoort (born 13 April 1993) is a Dutch former professional footballer who played as a right back.

== Club career ==
=== Ajax ===
Sven Nieuwpoort joined the youth ranks of Ajax in 2003 at the age of 10. He worked his way up through the youth ranks, until he signed his first professional contract, a two-year deal with Ajax on 21 December 2011, binding him to the club until July 2014. He was given the number 38 shirt and was on Frank de Boer's list of registered players for the 2012–13 UEFA Champions League campaign, practicing with the first team in De Lutte during trainingscamp, and playing alongside them in friendly encounters during the pre-season. The 2012–2013 season saw Sven playing in the Beloften Eredivisie with the reserve squad Jong Ajax. Not being called up to play for the first team before the winter transfer window, Nieuwpoort was loaned to Almere City FC for six months, for the remainder of the season, in order to obtain more experience in the Eerste Divisie, playing for AFC Ajax partner club in Flevoland. While at Almere City, Nieuwpoort was rejoined by his Ajax teammates Henri Toivomäki and Gino van Kessel, all serving loan spells in Almere. Sven made 15 appearances under manager Fred Grim, and finishing 14th with Almere CIty FC in the Eerste Divisie. Before returning to Amsterdam, while his younger brother Lars Nieuwpoort signed a two-year contract with Almere City FC.

=== Almere City (loan) ===
In the 2013–2014 season, Nieuwpoort participated in the pre-season training camp with the Ajax first team. On 29 June 2013 he played in a pre-season friendly match with Ajax against SDC Putten. The match ended in 1–4 away win for Ajax, with Nieuwpoort playing the full second half of the match after being substituted on for Stefano Denswil. On 6 July 2013, he appeared in another pre-season friendly encounter against German 2. Bundesliga side Dynamo Dresden, coming on for Ruben Ligeon in the second half of the 0–3 away win. On 13 July 2013, Nieuwpoort appeared in a friendly match against De Graafschap, when he was brought in for Joël Veltman in the 60th minute in the 0–3 win in Doetinchem. Maintaining his position as a reserve for Ajax, Nieuwpoort started the season, playing for Jong Ajax, the reserves team of the Amsterdam club. Having recently been promoted from the Beloften Eredivisie, to compete in the Eerste Divisie the second tier of professional football in the Netherlands, Nieuwpoort appeared in three matches for Jong Ajax during the 2013–14 season, before being loaned out to Almere City FC once more on 29 August 2013, for the remainder of the season.

=== Go Ahead Eagles ===
On 29 May 2014, it was announced that Nieuwpoort had signed a two-year contract with an option for an additional season with Go Ahead Eagles playing in the Eredivisie. Ajax opted not to extend his contract, leading to Nieuwpoort following fellow Ajax player Nick de Bondt to the club from Deventer, who had transferred to the club himself only weeks prior.

=== Cambuur ===
Nieuwpoort joined SC Cambuur in August 2019.

=== Excelsior ===
On 27 July 2021, he joined Excelsior on a one-year contract with an option for the second year. On 8 December 2023 he scored his first goal for Excelsior against FC Twente in a 4–2 loss. On 9 July 2024, Nieuwpoort announced his retirement from playing.

== International career ==
Nieuwpoort has played for the Netherlands on various youth levels, with his latest call-up being for the Netherlands U19 squad.

== Career statistics ==
=== Club performance ===
Club performance			League		Cup		Continental		Other		Total	
Season	Club	League	Apps	Goals	Apps	Goals	Apps	Goals	Apps	Goals	Apps	Goals
Netherlands			League		KNVB Cup		Europe^{1}		Other^{2}		Total	
2012–13	Ajax	Eredivisie	0	0	-	-	-	-	-	-	0	0
2012–13	Almere City (loan)	Eerste Divisie	15	0	-	-	-	-	-	-	15	0
2013–14	Jong Ajax	Eerste Divisie	3	0	-	-	-	-	-	-	3	0
2013–14	Almere City (loan)	Eerste Divisie	31	2	1	0	-	-	-	-	32	2
2014–15	Go Ahead Eagles	Eredivisie	27	1	2	0	-	-	0	0	29	1
2015–16	Go Ahead Eagles	Eerste Divisie	18	0	1	0	-	-	-	-	19	0
2016–17	De Graafschap	Eerste Divisie	29	1	1	0	-	-	-	-	30	1
2017–18	De Graafschap	Eerste Divisie	34	1	1	0	-	-	3	0	38	1
2018–19	De Graafschap	Eredivisie	19	0	1	0	-	-	4	0	24	0
2019–20	SC Cambuur	Eerste Divisie	3	0	-	-	-	-	-	-	3	0
2020–21	SC Cambuur	Eerste Divisie	11	1	2	0	-	-	-	-	13	1
2021–22	Excelsior	Eerste Divisie	33	0	1	0	-	-	6	0	40	0
2022–23	Excelsior	Eredivisie	23	0	0	0	-	-	-	-	23	0
2023–24	Excelsior	Eredivisie	22	1	3	0	-	-	0	0	25	1
Total	Netherlands		268	7	13	0	-	-	13	0	294	7
Career total			268	7	13	0	-	-	13	0	294	7

Statistics accurate as of last match played on 25 May 2024.

^{1} Includes UEFA Champions League and UEFA Europa League matches.

^{2} Includes Johan Cruijff Shield and Play Off matches.

== Honours ==
Cambuur

- Eerste Divisie: 2020–21
