= NextGen Series =

- Founded: 2011
- Abolished: 2013; 13 years ago
- Region: Europe
- Teams: 24 (group stage); 16 (knockout)
- Last champions: (England) Aston Villa
- Most championships: (Italy) Internazionale (England) Aston Villa (1 title each)
- Broadcaster: Eurosport

The NextGen Series was a European football club cup competition for under-19 footballers. It was designed to provide players with the opportunity to match themselves against other elite European footballers of their agegroup in a competitive environment. The competition was created by sports TV producer Justin Andrews, Mark Warburton and current Brentford F.C. owner Matthew Benham.

On 16 August 2013, organisers confirmed that the NextGen Series had been suspended for the 2013–14 campaign because of funding issues and lacking of competitive space since the creation of the UEFA Youth League.

== Background ==
Plans to create a European competition for youth footballers had long been explored. Ajax and Manchester City played a behind closed doors match in November 2010 as did Liverpool and Celtic. This was part of a trial scheme for the new competition.

The goal of the tournament was to help clubs replicate the Champions League experience for younger players.

=== Abolishment ===
The success of the NextGen Series caught the attention of the UEFA board and at end of 2012, the UEFA Youth League was created. A compromise deal was tabled by Andrews and Warburton, with the aim of combining the two tournaments and giving places to non-Champions League clubs with notable academies, but the proposal was rejected by UEFA. Another proposal, to run both leagues in tandem (with the winners meeting in the final), was also rejected.

== Format ==
Teams were picked for the first season of the tournament through invitation. The organisers selected 16 clubs. The clubs picked for the 2011–12 tournament were:

- (England) Aston Villa
- (England) Liverpool
- (England) Manchester City
- (England) Tottenham Hotspur
- (Germany) VfL Wolfsburg
- (Italy) Inter Milan
- (France) Marseille
- (Netherlands) Ajax
- (Netherlands) PSV Eindhoven
- (Norway) Molde FK
- (Norway) Rosenborg
- (Portugal) Sporting CP
- (Scotland) Celtic
- (Spain) Barcelona
- (Switzerland) FC Basel
- (Turkey) Fenerbahçe

15 clubs who participated at 2011–12 tournament (with the exception of Basel) took part in 2012–13 and were joined by 9 new entrants:

- (England) Arsenal
- (England) Chelsea
- (France) Paris Saint-Germain
- (Belgium) Anderlecht
- (Russia) CSKA Moscow
- (Spain) Athletic Bilbao
- (Italy) Juventus
- (Germany) Borussia Dortmund
- (Greece) Olympiacos

== Tournament ==
For the 2011–12 tournament, the 16 teams were split into four groups of four, playing each other home and away. The top two teams from each group went through to a knockout stage. The Quarter-Finals were played over one leg at the home ground of the group winners. The Final was played at the Matchroom Stadium in London on Sunday 25 March 2012, with an attendance of 3,500. The 2013 Final was held at the Stadio Giuseppe Sinigaglia in Como, Italy on 1 April 2013.

== Trophy ==
The NextGen Series trophy was manufactured by UK-based awards manufacturer Gaudio and was handed to the tournament winners.

== Rules ==
The teams participating in the NextGen series were limited to a squad size of no more than eighteen players. There was an age limit of 18 on players participating in the competition. However, each club had the option of including three players up to the age of 19, though only a maximum of two overage players were allowed to be on the pitch at any one time.

Match rules for the series, other than the age cap, were the same as those stipulated by the International Football Association Board, meaning that they were identical to those of most other international tournaments.

== Finals ==
Ed.	Years	Host city	Winners	Score	Runners-up	Third place	Score	Fourth place	No. teams
1	2011–12	London	(Italy); Internazionale	1–1 (5–3 p)	(Netherlands); Ajax	(England); Liverpool	2–0	(France); Marseille	16
2	2012–13	Como	(England); Aston Villa	2–0	(England); Chelsea	(Portugal); Sporting CP	3–1	(England); Arsenal	24

== Winners ==
Club	Winner	Runner-up	Winning Years	Runner-up Years
(Italy) Internazionale	1	–	2011–12	
(England) Aston Villa	1	–	2012–13	
(Netherlands) Ajax	–	1		2011–12
(England) Chelsea	–	1		2012–13
