= 2013–14 Jong Ajax season =

Jong Ajax
2013–14 season
- Chairman: Hennie Henrichs
- Manager: Alfons Groenendijk
- Eerste Divisie: 14th
- Top goalscorer: Dejan Meleg (12)
Home colours	Away colours

During the 2013–14 season Jong Ajax will participate in the Dutch Eerste Divisie, the 2nd tier of professional football in the Netherlands.

The 2013–14 AFC Ajax season marks the Jupiler League debut of the AFC Ajax reserves' squad Jong Ajax. Previously playing in the Beloften Eredivisie (a separate league for reserve teams, not included in the Dutch professional or amateur league structure) players were allowed to move around freely between the reserve team and the first team during the course of the season. This will no longer be the case as Jong Ajax will register and field a separate squad from that of Ajax first team whose home matches will be played at Sportpark De Toekomst while playing in the Eerste Divisie, except for the occasional match in the Amsterdam Arena. The only period in which players will be able to move between squads will be during the transfer windows. Furthermore, the team is not eligible for promotion to the Eredivisie. Jong Ajax are joined in the Eerste Divisie by Jong Twente and Jong PSV, reserve teams who have also moved from the Beloften Eredivisie to the Eerste Divisie.

== Pre-season ==
The first training for the 2013–14 season was held on 24 June 2013. In preparation for the new season Ajax organized a training stage at Sportpark De Toekomst, Amsterdam, Netherlands. The squad from manager Alfons Groenendijk stayed there from 15 July 2013 to 29 July 2013. During this training stage friendly matches were played against Voorschoten '97, Rijnsburgse Boys, Almere City FC and VV Noordwijk.

== Player statistics ==
Appearances for competitive matches only

No.	Pos	Nat	Player	Total		Eerste Divisie	
No.	Pos	Nat	Player	Apps	Goals	Apps	Goals
	GK	(Netherlands) NED	Peter Leeuwenburgh	3	0	3	0
	GK	(Netherlands) NED	Maurits Schmitz	1	0	1	0
	GK	(Netherlands) NED	Norbert Alblas	0	0	0	0
	DF	(Netherlands) NED	Djavan Anderson	8	0	8	0
	DF	(Netherlands) NED	Riechedly Bazoer	21	0	20+1	0
	DF	(Netherlands) NED	Branco van den Boomen	15	1	11+4	1
	DF	(Netherlands) NED	Bas Kuipers	26	1	24+2	1
	DF	(Netherlands) NED	Kenny Tete	26	0	24+2	0
	DF	(Curaçao) CUW	Derwin Martina	17	0	14+3	0
	DF	(Netherlands) NED	Jaïro Riedewald	9	0	9	0
	MF	(Slovakia) SVK	Stanislav Lobotka	30	3	22+8	3
	MF	(Netherlands) NED	Fabian Sporkslede	9	1	8+1	1
	MF	(Netherlands) NED	Abdel Malek El Hasnaoui	26	2	16+10	2
	MF	(Turkey) TUR	Sinan Keskin	6	0	0+6	0
	MF	(Afghanistan) AFG	Emran Barakzai	1	0	0+1	0
	MF	(China) CHN	Wang Chengkuai	2	0	1+1	0
	FW	(Netherlands) NED	Elton Acolatse	3	0	1+2	0
	FW	(Netherlands) NED	Jordi Bitter	2	0	0+2	0
	FW	(Netherlands) NED	Nick de Bondt	16	0	9+7	0
	FW	(Netherlands) NED	Sam Hendriks	22	5	6+16	5
	FW	(Germany) GER	Marvin Höner	4	0	2+2	0
	FW	(Netherlands) NED	Ricardo Kishna	6	2	6	2
	FW	(Serbia) SRB	Dejan Meleg	27	12	23+4	12
First team players who have made appearances for reserve squad:
	GK	(Netherlands) NED	Kenneth Vermeer	4	0	4	0
	GK	(Netherlands) NED	Jasper Cillessen	3	0	3	0
	GK	(Netherlands) NED	Mickey van der Hart	27	0	27	0
	DF	(Finland) FIN	Niklas Moisander	1	0	1	0
	DF	(Netherlands) NED	Daley Blind	1	0	1	0
	DF	(Denmark) DEN	Nicolai Boilesen	1	0	1	0
	DF	(Netherlands) NED	Stefano Denswil	9	1	9	1
	DF	(Netherlands) NED	Ruben Ligeon	17	0	17	0
	DF	(Netherlands) NED	Joël Veltman	3	1	3	1
	DF	(Netherlands) NED	Mike van der Hoorn	12	0	11+1	0
	MF	(Denmark) DEN	Lasse Schöne	1	0	1	0
	MF	(Netherlands) NED	Davy Klaassen	6	1	6	1
	MF	(South Africa) RSA	Thulani Serero	3	0	3	0
	MF	(Netherlands) NED	Lerin Duarte	3	0	3	0
	FW	(Denmark) DEN	Lucas Andersen	18	6	18	6
	FW	(Sweden) SWE	Tobias Sana	26	3	26	3
	FW	(Netherlands) NED	Lesley de Sa	17	7	17	7
Youth players who have made appearances for reserve squad:
	DF	(Netherlands) NED	Tom Noordhoff	1	0	1	0
	DF	(Netherlands) NED	Damon Mirani	1	0	0+1	0
	DF	(Netherlands) NED	Shaquill Sno	3	0	0+3	0
	DF	(Netherlands) NED	Robert van Koesveld	0	0	0	0
	MF	(Netherlands) NED	Danny Bakker	0	0	0	0
	MF	(Netherlands) NED	Melvin Vissers	2	0	0+2	0
	MF	(Suriname) SUR	Damil Dankerlui	1	0	0+1	0
	FW	(Netherlands) NED	Sheraldo Becker	14	1	11+3	1
Players sold or loaned out after the start of the season:
	DF	(Netherlands) NED	Danzell Gravenberch	13	1	11+2	1
	FW	(Curaçao) CUW	Gino van Kessel	0	0	0	0
	DF	(Switzerland) SUI	Stefan Marinković	2	0	0+2	0
	DF	(Netherlands) NED	Sven Nieuwpoort	3	0	1+2	0
	MF	(Cameroon) CMR	Eyong Enoh	9	0	9	0
	MF	(Netherlands) NED	Joeri de Kamps	4	0	3+1	0
	FW	(Bosnia and Herzegovina) BIH	Boban Lazić	10	1	4+6	1
	FW	(Netherlands) NED	Geoffrey Castillion	6	1	4+2	1
	FW	(Netherlands) NED	Vincent Vermeij	17	3	6+11	3
	FW	(Netherlands) NED	Danny Hoesen	4	1	4	1

Updated 1 March 2014

=== Eerste Divisie standings 2013–14 ===
Current standing	Matches played	Wins	Draws	Losses	Points	Goals for	Goals against	Yellow cards (yellow card)	Red cards (red card)
14	38	15	5	18	50	57	72	58	8

==== Points by match day ====
Match day	1	2	3	4	5	6	7	8	9	10	11	12	13	14	15	16	17	18	19	20	21	22	23	24	25	26	27	28	29	30	31	32	33	34	Total				
Points	3	0	0	1	3	3	0	1	3	0	0	0	0	0	0	0	3	0	1	1	3	3	0	3	0	3	1	3	3	3	3	3	0	0	0	0	3	0	50

==== Total points by match day ====
Match day	1	2	3	4	5	6	7	8	9	10	11	12	13	14	15	16	17	18	19	20	21	22	23	24	25	26	27	28	29	30	31	32	33	34	Total			
Points	3	3	3	4	7	10	10	11	14	14	14	14	14	14	14	14	17	17	18	19	22	25	25	28	28	31	32	35	38	41	44	47	47	47	50	50	50	50

==== Standing by match day ====
Match day	1	2	3	4	5	6	7	8	9	10	11	12	13	14	15	16	17	18	19	20	21	22	23	24	25	26	27	28	29	30	31	32	33	34	Standing			
Standing	3	7	12	15	9	6	9	9	9	9	11	14	15	16	16	17	16	18	18	18	18	16	16	15	16	15	15	15	15	15	11	8	12	12	13	14	14	14

==== Goals by match day ====
Match day	1	2	3	4	5	6	7	8	9	10	11	12	13	14	15	16	17	18	19	20	21	22	23	24	25	26	27	28	29	30	31	32	33	34	Total				
Goals	2	0	0	1	2	4	1	1	2	2	1	0	1	0	2	1	2	1	1	2	1	3	0	2	1	4	1	4	3	3	2	1	1	0	0	0	4	0	57

=== 2012–13 Team records ===
Description	Competition	Result
Biggest win	(Netherlands) Friendlies	Jong Ajax – RKSV Nemelaer ( 15–0 )
Biggest win	(Netherlands) Eerste Divisie	Jong Ajax – Helmond Sport ( 4–0 )
Biggest loss	(Netherlands) Friendlies	Rijnsburgse Boys – Jong Ajax ( 5–3 )
Biggest loss	(Netherlands) Eerste Divisie	Willem II – Jong Ajax ( 7–1 )
Most goals in a match	(Netherlands) Friendlies	Jong Ajax – RKSV Nemelaer ( 15–0 )
Most goals in a match	(Netherlands) Eerste Divisie	Jong PSV – Jong Ajax ( 2–4 )

==== Topscorers ====
Friendlies

Nr.	Name	Goal
1.	(Netherlands) Sam Hendriks	8
2.	(Germany) Marvin Höner	5
3.	(Netherlands) Riechedly Bazoer	3
4.	(Netherlands) Joeri de Kamps	2
4.	(Netherlands) Geoffrey Castillion	2
4.	(Bosnia and Herzegovina) Boban Lazić	2
4.	(Netherlands) Lesley de Sa	2
4.	(Serbia) Dejan Meleg	2
4.	(Denmark) Lucas Andersen	2
10.	(Nigeria) Moses Simon	1
10.	(Netherlands) Jody Lukoki	1
10.	(Netherlands) Vincent Vermeij	1
10.	(Netherlands) Abdel Malek El Hasnaoui	1
10.	(Slovakia) Stanislav Lobotka	1
10.	(Curaçao) Derwin Martina	1
10.	(Turkey) Sinan Keskin	1
Total		35

Eerste Divisie

Nr.	Name	Goal
1.	(Serbia) Dejan Meleg	12
2.	(Netherlands) Lesley de Sa	7
3.	(Denmark) Lucas Andersen	6
4.	(Netherlands) Sam Hendriks	5
5.	(Netherlands) Vincent Vermeij	3
5.	(Slovakia) Stanislav Lobotka	3
5.	(Sweden) Tobias Sana	3
8.	(Netherlands) Ricardo Kishna	2
8.	(Netherlands) Abdel Malek El Hasnaoui	2
10.	(Bosnia and Herzegovina) Boban Lazić	1
10.	(Netherlands) Fabian Sporkslede	1
10.	(Netherlands) Geoffrey Castillion	1
10.	(Netherlands) Davy Klaassen	1
10.	(Netherlands) Joël Veltman	1
10.	(Netherlands) Danny Hoesen	1
10.	(Netherlands) Bas Kuipers	1
10.	(Netherlands) Danzell Gravenberch	1
10.	(Netherlands) Stefano Denswil	1
10.	(Netherlands) Branco van den Boomen	1
10.	(Netherlands) Sheraldo Becker	1
Own goals	(Netherlands) Sander Fischer (SBV Excelsior)	1
Own goals	(Netherlands) Marco van Duin (Almere City FC)	1
Own goals	(Netherlands) Norichio Nieveld (FC Eindhoven)	1
Total		57

== Competitions ==
All times are in CEST

=== Eerste Divisie ===
5 August 2013	Jong Ajax	2 – 0	Telstar	Amsterdam
14:00 CET	Denswil (yellow card) 25'; Andersen 39', 49'	Report	Mac-Intosch (yellow card) 77'	Stadium: Amsterdam ArenA; Attendance: 7,064; Referee: Richard Martens

9 August 2013	FC Oss	2 – 0	Jong Ajax	Oss
14:00 CET	Deenen 48' van de Sande (yellow card) 77'; Janssen (yellow card) 85' van den Meiracker 90+3'	Report	Gravenberch (yellow card) 18'; Tete (yellow card) 22'; Boilesen (yellow card) 51' de Kamps (yellow card) 90+2'	Stadium: Frans Heesen Stadion; Attendance: 3,449; Referee: Merlijn Gerritsen

16 August 2013	MVV Maastricht	1 – 0	Jong Ajax	Maastricht
14:00 CET	Smeets 70' (pen.); Rutjes (yellow card) 90'	Report	Tete (yellow card) 69'	Stadium: De Geusselt; Attendance: 5,209; Referee: Allard Lindhout

26 August 2013	Jong Ajax	1 – 1	FC Emmen	Amsterdam
14:00 CET	de Kamps (yellow card) 40' de Sa 52'	Report	Martinus (yellow card) 29'; Metaj (yellow card) 39'; Roema (yellow card) 42'; Bannik 49'	Stadium: De Toekomst; Attendance: 1,153; Referee: Davy Otto

30 August 2013	Jong Ajax	2 – 1	Jong Twente	Amsterdam
14:00 CET	de Kamps (red card); Vermeij 38'; Lazić 65'	Report	Yahaya (yellow card) 48'; Kuiper (red card); Peters 86'; Born (yellow card) 88'	Stadium: De Toekomst; Attendance: 876; Referee: Merlijn Gerritsen

2 September 2013	Jong PSV	2 – 4	Jong Ajax	Eindhoven
20:00 CET	Rayhi 4'; Bentancourt 10'; Jørgensen (yellow card) 64'; Tytoń (yellow card) 72'	Report	Meleg 50', 63'; Lobotka 55'; Sporkslede 73'	Stadium: Philips Stadion; Attendance: 1,500; Referee: Siemen Mulder

8 September 2013	Achilles '29	2 – 1	Jong Ajax	Groesbeek
20:30 CET	Hendriks 30'; Thoone 74'	Report	Kuipers (yellow card) 15'; Castillion 89'	Stadium: De Heikant; Attendance: 2,270; Referee: Edwin Boot

15 September 2013	Jong Ajax	1 – 1	Willem II	Amsterdam
8:00 CET	Andersen 21'; Sporkslede (yellow card) 28'; Tete (yellow card) 50'; Klaassen (yellow card) 71'	Report	Andrade 50' (pen.); Vossebelt (yellow card) 75'; Haemhouts (yellow card) 83'; Freek Heerkens (yellow card) 90'	Stadium: De Toekomst; Attendance: 900; Referee: Rogier Honig

20 September 2013	FC Eindhoven	1 – 2	Jong Ajax	Eindhoven
20:30 CET	Makiavala 15' (yellow card) 90+2'; Beekmans (yellow card) 26'; Deschilder (yellow card) 77'	Report	de Sa 9'; Klaassen 25' (yellow card) 64'; Enoh (yellow card) 34'; Meleg (yellow card) 52'	Stadium: Jan Louwers Stadion; Attendance: 3,418; Referee: Edwin van de Graaf

30 September 2013	Jong Ajax	2 – 3	FC Volendam	Amsterdam
14:00 CET	Veltman 7'; Meleg 38'; Sana 64'; Sporkslede (red card)	Report	Mühren 50', 69'; Menzo 60'; Schwiebbe (yellow card) 78'; Timmermans (red card)	Stadium: De Toekomst; Referee: Richard Martens

6 October 2013	SBV Excelsior	3 – 1	Jong Ajax	Rotterdam
20:30 CET	Stans 4'; Hutten (yellow card) 28'; Veldwijk (yellow card) 37'; Botaka 50', 90+4'; Auassar (yellow card) 90'	Report	Lazić (yellow card) 17'; Fischer 48' (o.g.); Gravenberch (yellow card) 50'; Castillion (yellow card) 59'; Kuipers (yellow card) 69'	Stadium: Stadion Woudestein; Attendance: 2,338; Referee: Dha Otto

14 October 2013	Jong Ajax	0 – 3	Fortuna Sittard	Amsterdam
20:00 CET	Gravenberch (yellow card) 29' (red card)	Report	Khalouta 6'; Briels (yellow card) 40'; Vankan 76'; Gulpen 80'	Stadium: De Toekomst; Attendance: 456; Referee: Martin Perez

21 October 2013	VVV-Venlo	5 – 1	Jong Ajax	Venlo
20:00 CET	Wolters (yellow card) 30' (goal) 53', 73' de Kogel 40' (pen.), 41' (yellow card) 50'; Rajcomar 89'	Report	Lobotka 7'; Enoh (yellow card) 68'; Kuipers (yellow card) 77'	Stadium: De Koel; Attendance: 4,500; Referee: Jeroen Manschot

28 October 2013	Jong Ajax	0 – 4	FC Dordrecht	Amsterdam
21:00 CET	Bazoer (yellow card) 28'; Vermeij (yellow card) 34' (red card); Enoh (yellow card) 38'; Martina (yellow card) 75'; Kuipers (yellow card) 90+2'	Report	Alisic (yellow card) 27' (goal) 77'; Korte 33'; Gladon 51' van Nieff 90' (yellow card) 90'	Stadium: De Toekomst; Attendance: 266; Referee: Edwin van de Graaf

4 November 2013	Helmond Sport	3 – 2	Jong Ajax	Helmond
14:00 CET	Sequeira (yellow card) 62'; Kazlauskas 65'; Koç 78'; Janssen 84'	Report	Lobotka 5'; Hoesen 52'	Stadium: Stadion De Braak; Attendance: 3,114; Referee: Ton Koekoek

11 November 2013	Jong Ajax	1 – 2	De Graafschap	Amsterdam
20:00 CET	Hendriks 22'; Martina (red card); Sana (yellow card) 58' de Bondt (yellow card) 62'	Report	Jansen 43' (yellow card) 62'; Parzyszek 58' (pen.)	Stadium: De Toekomst; Attendance: 377; Referee: Allard Lindhout

17 November 2013	Jong Ajax	2 – 1	Sparta Rotterdam	Amsterdam
18:30 CET	Vermeij 21'; Sno (yellow card) 57' de Sa 76' (yellow card) 82'	Report	Nys (yellow card) 21'; Bilate 26'; El Hassnaoui (yellow card) 78'	Stadium: De Toekomst; Attendance: 736; Referee: Rogier Honig

22 November 2013	FC Den Bosch	4 – 1	Jong Ajax	's-Hertogenbosch
14:00 CET	de Looijer (yellow card) 20'; Quekel 42', 64', 70'; Seuntjes 86'	Report	Vermeij 34'; Enoh (yellow card) 66' (red card) van den Boomen (yellow card) 90'	Stadium: De Vliert; Attendance: 5,187; Referee: Edwin Boot

2 December 2013	Jong Ajax	1 – 1	Almere City	Amsterdam
20:00 CET	Andersen 28' van der Hoorn (yellow card) 55'; Tete (yellow card) 72'	Report	Nieuwpoort (yellow card) 10'; Serrarens 45+1' (yellow card) 76'	Stadium: De Toekomst; Attendance: 627; Referee: Carel van den Heuvel

9 December 2013	Jong Ajax	2 – 2	Jong PSV	Amsterdam
20:00 CET	Hendriks 77' (pen.); Kuipers 82'	Report	Rayhi 7'; Heesakers (yellow card) 40' (yellow-red card) 76'; Horsten (yellow card) 45'; Manolev 59'; Leemans (yellow card) 81'	Stadium: De Toekomst; Attendance: 831; Referee: Martin Perez

16 December 2013	Jong Twente	0 – 1	Jong Ajax	Enschede
14:00 CET	Peters (yellow card) 65'; Tanda (yellow card) 66'; Breukers (yellow card) 67'	Report	de Sa 67' (pen.)	Stadium: De Vliert; Referee: Richard Martens

20 December 2013	Jong Ajax	3 – 1	MVV Maastricht	Amsterdam
14:00 CET	Kuipers (yellow card) 7'; Sana 27' de Sa 31'; Gravenberch 58'	Report	Gravenberch 59' (o.g.); Veldmate (yellow card) 60' van Hyfte (yellow card) 65'	Stadium: De Toekomst; Attendance: 456; Referee: Siemen Mulder

17 January 2014	FC Emmen	4 – 0	Jong Ajax	Emmen
14:00 CET	Bergkamp 13'; Siekman (yellow card) 30' (yellow-red card) 68'; Pedro (yellow card) 45'; Bannink 52'; Resida 76', 80'	Report	van den Boomen (yellow card) 83'; El Hasnaoui (yellow card) 89' (red card)	Stadium: Univé Stadion; Attendance: 4,520; Referee: Christiaan Bax

27 January 2014	Jong Ajax	2 – 1	FC Oss	Amsterdam
14:00 CET	Meleg 35'; Denswil 54' (yellow card) 90+3'; Ligeon (yellow card) 89'	Report	Tissingh (yellow card) 52'; Philips 82'	Stadium: De Toekomst; Attendance: 345; Referee: Merlijn Gerritsen

31 January 2014	Telstar	3 – 1	Jong Ajax	Velsen
14:00 CET	Brands 26' van Huizen 36'; Korpershoek (yellow card) 43' van Mieghem 56'	Report	van de Boomen 3'; Andersen (yellow card) 61'	Stadium: TATA Steel Stadion; Attendance: 2,963; Referee: Edwin van de Graaf

10 February 2014	Jong Ajax	4 – 1	VVV-Venlo	Amsterdam
14:00 CET	Andersen 40'; Kishna 52' de Sa 52', 90'	Report	de Kogel 6'	Stadium: De Toekomst; Attendance: 432; Referee: Jeroen Manschot

14 February 2014	FC Dordrecht	1 – 1	Jong Ajax	Dordrecht
14:00 CET	Fortes (yellow card) 45'; Denswil 50' (o.g.)	Report	Kishna 57'; Tete (yellow card) 79'	Stadium: GN Bouw Stadion; Attendance: 3,325; Referee: Siemen Mulder

23 February 2014	Sparta Rotterdam	2 – 4	Jong Ajax	Rotterdam
14:00 CET	Dogan (yellow card) 26'; Sinouh (yellow card) 58'; Breedijk (yellow card) 68'; Mahi 82'; Roorda (yellow card) 83'; Bruinier 90'	Report	Meleg 8', 58' (pen.); El Hasnaoui 83'; Hendriks 89'	Stadium: Het Kasteel; Attendance: 4,781; Referee: Rogier Honig

28 February 2014	Jong Ajax	3 – 2	FC Den Bosch	Amsterdam
14:00 CET	Sana 9' (yellow card) 14'; Meleg 60' van den Boomen (red card); Becker 69'	Report	Seuntjes (yellow card) 14'; Quekel 47' (yellow card) 90+2'; Zeldenrust 74' van den Broek (red card); Boddaert (red card)	Stadium: Amsterdam Arena; Attendance: 6,575; Referee: Edwin Boot

8 March 2014	Almere City	0 – 3	Jong Ajax	Almere
16:30 CET	Keller (yellow card) 33'; Toet (yellow card) 37' van Duin 60' (o.g.)	Report	Meleg 2'; Tete (yellow card) 40'; El Hasnaoui (yellow card) 64'; Hendriks 85'	Stadium: Mitsubishi Forklift Stadion; Referee: Richard Martens

16 March 2014	Jong Ajax	2 – 1	Achilles '29	Amsterdam
14:00 CET	Meleg 61'; Andersen 71'; Keskin (yellow card) 89'	Report	Hendriks 54'	Stadium: De Toekomst; Attendance: 301; Referee: Christiaan Bax

21 March 2014	Fortuna Sittard	0 – 1	Jong Ajax	Sittard
20:00 CET		Report	Becker (yellow card) 43'; El Hasnaoui 63'	Stadium: Trendwork Arena; Attendance: 4,212; Referee: Jeroen Sanders

30 March 2014	Willem II	7 – 1	Jong Ajax	Tilburg
10:30 CET	Boymans 18', 77'; Andrade 24', 31' (pen.), 45'; Ondaan 54'; Ippel (yellow card) 57'; Messaoud 78'; Mathieu (yellow card) 81'	Report	Sana 7'; Kuipers (yellow card) 17'; Bazoer (yellow card) 47'; Tete (yellow card) 57'; Wang (yellow card) 70' von den Boomen (yellow card) 82'	Stadium: Koning Willem II Stadion; Attendance: 9,850; Referee: Jeroen Manschot

7 April 2014	Jong Ajax	1 – 2	FC Eindhoven	Amsterdam
14:00 CET	Lobotka (yellow card) 22'; Nieveld 37' (o.g.) van den Boomen (yellow card) 60'; Bazoer (yellow card) 66'	Report	de Groot 42' van Son 56'; Nieveld (yellow card) 88'	Stadium: De Toekomst; Attendance: 376; Referee: Allard Lindhout

11 April 2014	FC Volendam	1 – 0	Jong Ajax	Volendam
14:00 CET	Mühren 56'; Veerman (yellow card) 63'; Luirink (yellow card) 70'; Tol (yellow card) 74'	Report	Bazoer (yellow card) 81'	Stadium: Kras Stadion; Attendance: 4,922; Referee: Edwin van de Graaf

18 April 2014	Jong Ajax	0 – 2	SBV Excelsior	Amsterdam
14:00 CET	Kuipers (yellow card) 45'; Tete (yellow card) 64'	Report	Veldwijk 7'; Mattheij 59'	Stadium: De Toekomst; Referee: Carel van den Heuvel

21 April 2014	Jong Ajax	4 – 0	Helmond Sport	Amsterdam
14:00 CET	Meleg 13', 33', 53'; Hendriks 90+1'	Report	Teijsse (yellow card) 68'	Stadium: De Toekomst; Attendance: 325; Referee: Ingmar Oostrom

25 April 2014	De Graafschap	2 – 0	Jong Ajax	Doetinchem
14:00 CET	Vermeij 7', 20'; Massop (yellow card) 90'	Report	Kuipers (yellow card) 59'; Sno (yellow card) 63'	Stadium: De Vijverberg; Attendance: 7,803; Referee: Rogier Honig

=== Friendlies ===
17 July 2013	Jong Ajax (Netherlands)	5 – 0	(Netherlands) Voorschoten '97	Amsterdam, Netherlands
19:30	Bazoer; Simon; Hendriks; Voorschoten '97 (o.g.); Höner	Report		Stadium: De Toekomst

22 July 2013	Rijnsburgse Boys (Netherlands)	5 – 3	(Netherlands) Jong Ajax	Rijnsburg, Netherlands
19:00	van der Vijver van Eeuwijk; Martina; Ignacio; Wijks	Report	de Kamps; Bazoer; Lukoki	Stadium: Middelmors

27 July 2013	Jong Ajax (Netherlands)	1 – 1	(Netherlands) Almere City	Amsterdam, Netherlands
13:00	Höner 60'	Report	Dissels 21'	Stadium: Sportpark De Toekomst

29 July 2013	VV Noordwijk (Netherlands)	0 – 0	(Netherlands) Jong Ajax	Noordwijk, Netherlands
19:30		Report		Stadium: Sportpark Duinwetering

20 August 2013	Jong Ajax (Netherlands)	15 – 0	(Netherlands) RKSV Nemelaer	Amsterdam, Netherlands
20:00	Hendriks; Castillion; Höner; Lazić; Vermeij; El Hasnaoui; Lobotka de Sa	Report		Stadium: Sportpark De Toekomst

22 August 2013	Jong Ajax (Netherlands)	1 – 0	(Indonesia) Pro Duta FC	Amsterdam, Netherlands
17:30	de Kamps 40'	Report		Stadium: Sportpark De Toekomst

5 February 2014	ADO '20 (Netherlands)	3 – 2	(Netherlands) Jong Ajax	Heemskerk, Netherlands
17:00		Report	Hendriks; Meleg	Stadium: Sportpark de Vlotter

18 February 2014	Jong Ajax (Netherlands)	5 – 0	(Netherlands) De Zouaven	Amsterdam, Netherlands
20:00	Andersen 3'; Meleg 7' de Sa 43'; Höner 75'; Hendriks 86'	Report		Stadium: De Toekomst

5 March 2014	Quick Boys (Netherlands)	2 – 2	(Netherlands) Jong Ajax	Katwijk, Netherlands
20:00	De Vries 53' van Duijn 66'	Report	Martina 38' (pen.); Andersen 85'	Stadium: Nieuw Zuid

29 April 2014	TEC Tiel (Netherlands)	3 – 3	(Netherlands) Jong Ajax	Tiel, Netherlands
19:00		Report	Hendriks, Bazoer, Keskin	Stadium: De Lok
