= Stefan Marinković =

Swiss footballer (born 1994)

Personal information
- Full name: Stefan Marinković
- Date of birth: 20 February 1994 (age 32)
- Place of birth: Lucerne, Switzerland
- Height: 1.84 m (6 ft 0 in)
- Position: Left back

Youth career
- –2011: Luzern
- 2011–2013: Ajax

Senior career*
Years	Team	Apps	(Gls)
2013	Jong Ajax	2	(0)
2014	Inter Turku	20	(0)
2015	Dukla Banská Bystrica	4	(1)
2015	ŽP Šport Podbrezová	0	(0)
2016	OFK Bačka	0	(0)
2016	Kozara Gradiška	16	(0)
2017–2018	Kriens	3	(0)
2019	FC Kickers Luzern	8	(2)
2019–2020	FC Rotkreuz	0	(0)

International career
2010–2011	Switzerland U16	3	(0)
2011–2012	Switzerland U17	6	(1)
- * Club domestic league appearances and goals as of 17:37, 17 December 2023 (UTC)

Stefan Marinković (Serbian Cyrillic: Стефан Маринковић, born 20 February 1994) is a Swiss professional footballer who last played as a left back for FC Rotkreuz.

== Career ==
=== FC Luzern ===
Born in Lucerne, Switzerland, Stefan Marinković began his career in the youth ranks of local Swiss Super League side FC Luzern. During his tenure in the various youth ranks at Lucerne, Stefan Marinković had several trial periods with both Juventus and Arsenal, before the young left back opted to sign with Ajax instead. Moving to the Netherlands, and joining the clubs famed Youth Academy.

=== AFC Ajax ===
On 2 February 2011 it was announced that Ajax Amsterdam had acquired the young left back from the Swiss club on a 3-year contract lasting until 1 July 2014. Already a member of the Switzerland U-17 national team at age 16, Ajax won the young player over ahead of Juventus, Sampdoria, Brescia, Nancy and Valenciennes, all who were in running for the young defender. Joining the Ajax B1 squad at first, Stefan worked his way up the youth ranks even playing in the Beloften Eredivisie for the reserves team Jong Ajax during the 2011–2012 season. On 28 January 2012, in a match against ADO Den Haag reserves that Stefan Marinković suffered a severe injury. Sidelined for an entire season, it wasn't until the 2013–2014 season, that he made his professional debut on 30 August 2013 playing for the reserves team Jong Ajax against Jong Twente in the Dutch Eerste Divisie, the 2nd tier of professional football in the Netherlands. The match ended in a 2–1 win for Jong Ajax, with Marinković coming on in the 77' minute for Derwin Martina.

=== Inter Turku ===
On 13 February 2014 it was announced that Stefan Marinković had signed with Finnish Veikkausliiga side Inter Turku.

=== Dukla ===
During 2015 he played in Slovakia with FK Dukla Banská Bystrica and FO ŽP Šport Podbrezová.

=== Bačka and Kozara ===
In the winter-break of the 2015–16 season he left Slovakia and moved to Serbia where he signed with Serbian First League side OFK Bačka who finished the first half of the season in second place with good perspectives of getting promotion to the Serbian SuperLiga at the end of the season.

However, despite achieving promotion, Marinković left Bačka that summer, 2016, and he moved to neighboring Bosnia and Herzegovina, more precisely to Republika Srpska, and joined FK Kozara Gradiška playing in the First League of the Republika Srpska, one of the two second-level leagues in Bosnia.

=== Return to Switzerland ===
In the winter-break of the 2016–17 season, Marinković weighted the offers and decided to return to Switzerland after 6 years playing abroad, and signed with SC Kriens playing in the Swiss Promotion League.

Ahead of the 2019/20 season, Marinković joined FC Rotkreuz after having spent six months with FC Kickers Luzern.

== International career ==
Stefan Marinković has Dual citizenship and holds both Swiss and Serbian passports, and was eligible to represent either team internationally. He received his first call-ups for the Switzerland national under-16 team in a friendly match against Germany U-16 which ended in a 4–2 loss for the Swiss. Stefan Marinković has since received a total of three call-ups by Serbian youth coach Milovan Đorić for friendly matches, but sat on the bench for the duration of the fixtures having never been fully capped by the Serbia national team.

== Career statistics ==
=== Club performance ===
As of 2013-10-01

Club performance			League		Cup		Continental^{1}		Other^{2}		Total	
Season	Club	League	Apps	Goals	Apps	Goals	Apps	Goals	Apps	Goals	Apps	Goals
Netherlands			League		KNVB Cup		Europe		Other		Total	
2013–14	Ajax	Eredivisie	0	0	0	0	0	0	0	0	0	0
Total	Netherlands		0	0	0	0	0	0	0	0	0	0
Career total			0	0	0	0	0	0	0	0	0	0

^{1} Includes UEFA Champions League and UEFA Europa League matches.

^{2} Includes Johan Cruijff Shield and Play-off matches.

Reserves performance

Club performance			League		Cup		Total	
Season	Club	League	Apps	Goals	Apps	Goals	Apps	Goals
Netherlands			League		KNVB Reserve Cup		Total	
2013–14	Jong Ajax	Jupiler League	2	0	0	0	2	0
Total	Netherlands		2	0	0	0	2	0
Career total			2	0	0	0	2	0
