= Lesly de Sa =

Dutch footballer (born 1993)

Personal information
- Full name: Lesly Dumas de Sa
- Date of birth: 2 April 1993 (age 33)
- Place of birth: Mijdrecht, Netherlands
- Height: 1.70 m (5 ft 7 in)
- Position: Winger

Youth career
- –2002: Argon
- 2002–2011: Ajax

Senior career*
| Years | Team | Apps | (Gls) |
| 2011–2016 | Ajax | 13 | (1) |
| 2013–2015 | Jong Ajax | 17 | (7) |
| 2014–2015 | → Go Ahead Eagles (loan) | 16 | (1) |
| 2015–2016 | → Willem II (loan) | 18 | (0) |
| 2016–2018 | Slovan Bratislava | 25 | (3) |
| 2017–2018 | → Oss (loan) | 10 | (0) |
| 2020 | Eskilstuna | 1 | (0) |
| 2021 | Tsarsko Selo | 12 | (0) |
| 2022–2023 | Ajax Amateurs | 20 | (1) |

International career
| 2007–2008 | Netherlands U15 | 5 | (1) |
| 2008–2009 | Netherlands U16 | 5 | (1) |
| 2009–2010 | Netherlands U17 | 11 | (1) |
| 2010–2011 | Netherlands U18 | 3 | (0) |
| 2011 | Netherlands U19 | 9 | (0) |
| 2012–2013 | Netherlands U19 | 3 | (0) |
| 2013 | Netherlands U21 | 2 | (0) |
- * Club domestic league appearances and goals

Lesly Dumas de Sa (born 2 April 1993) is a Dutch former professional footballer who played as a winger. He is currently the assistant coach of Ajax' under-14 team.

A youth product of Ajax, De Sa went on loan to Go Ahead Eagles and Willem II before joining Slovak side Slovan Bratislava in 2016. After two years, including a loan spell at FC Oss, he was released. In 2020, he moved to Swedish club AFC Eskilstuna, and later had a brief stint in Bulgaria with Tsarsko Selo in 2021. He then returned to Ajax' amateur team, where he retired in 2023.

Following his retirement, De Sa transitioned into coaching, becoming assistant coach of Ajax's under-14 team under Frank Korpershoek.

== Club career ==
=== Ajax ===
De Sa began his football career in the youth system of SV Argon before joining the Ajax academy in 2002. He made his first-team debut on 21 September 2011 in a KNVB Cup match against VV Noordwijk, replacing Aras Özbiliz and scoring in the 61st minute of a 3–1 away win. Although he was named in matchday squads for the 2011–12 Eredivisie season, he did not make a league appearance, instead featuring for Jong Ajax. He made his Eredivisie debut on 20 October 2012, coming on as a substitute for Tobias Sana in a 3–3 draw against Heracles Almelo. Viktor Fischer also made his league debut in the same match.

De Sa started the 2013–14 season with Jong Ajax, who had recently been promoted to the Eerste Divisie. He played in the team's first-ever second-tier match on 5 August 2013, starting on the right wing in a 2–0 home win against Telstar, before being substituted in the 76th minute for Marvin Höner. He scored his first goal of the season on 26 August 2013 in a 1–1 draw against Emmen.

On 28 August 2013, De Sa was included in the first-team lineup for an Eredivisie match against Go Ahead Eagles, marking his first start for Ajax. He scored Ajax's second goal in a 6–0 win and provided an assist for Kolbeinn Sigþórsson. He was substituted in the 69th minute for Lucas Andersen. The following match, on 1 October 2013, he made his continental debut in the 2013–14 UEFA Champions League group stage, starting in a 1–1 draw against Milan before being replaced by Andersen in the 64th minute.

==== Loan to Go Ahead Eagles ====
De Sa spent the 2014–15 season on loan at Go Ahead Eagles, playing 16 matches and scoring once. He made his debut for the club on 10 August 2014 during the first round of the Eredivisie, at home against Groningen. De Sa scored the 2–0 goal in the 50th minute, after which Groningen mounted a comeback to win 3–2. Partly due to injuries, De Sa was unable to play for large parts of the season. Go Ahead finished the season in seventeenth place in the Eredivisie, which followed by relegation via the 2015 play-offs. On 13 May 2015, it was announced that Ajax were considering transfer-listing De Sa. After the season, the Slovak club AS Trenčín showed interest in acquiring De Sa.

==== Loan to Willem II ====
On 22 June 2015, it was announced that De Sa was being sent on loan to Willem II together with Ruben Ligeon and Richairo Zivkovic. On 9 August 2015, De Sa made his official debut for the club in a match in the Eredivisie against Vitesse which ended in a 1–1 draw. He was in the starting lineup and was replaced by Justin Mathieu ten minutes before the final whistle. In a KNVB Cup match against the amateurs of DOVO, he scored his first official goal for the Tricolores. De Sa was responsible for the 3–0 final score just before time. He finished the season in sixteenth place with Willem II in the Eredivisie, after which the club forced survival in the league through the 2016 play-offs.

=== Slovan Bratislava ===
In May 2016, De Sa signed a four-year contract with Slovak club Slovan Bratislava who incorporated him transfer-free after Ajax did not renew his contract. De Sa started the new season with Bratislava in a team with fellow countrymen Ruben Ligeon, Lorenzo Burnet, Mitchell Schet and Joeri de Kamps, among others. On 28 June 2016, De Sa made his official debut for Slovan. On that day, they played a match in the first qualifying round of the UEFA Europa League against Partizani Tirana, which finished in a 0–0 draw.

=== Oss, Eskilstuna and Tsarsko Selo ===
De Sa was sent on loan to FC Oss on 31 August 2017 for a season. He suffered a cruciate ligament injury in his knee in December 2017, which meant that he saw limited playing time in the second half of his stint in Oss. After his loan period ended, De Sa returned to Slovan Bratislava, where he was allowed to leave on a free transfer. After being without a club for a year and a half, he joined the Swedish club AFC Eskilstuna in February 2020, competing in the second-tier Superettan. In February 2021, De Sa moved to Bulgarian club Tsarsko Selo Sofia, after maintaining his fitness levels by practicing with SC Telstar.

=== Retirement ===
In February 2023, De Sa returned to Ajax, joining their amateur team in the Derde Divisie. He retired from professional football at the conclusion of the 2022–23 season.

== International career ==
De Sa is of Angolan descent. On 27 November 2007, he made his international debut for the Netherlands at youth level playing for the Netherlands U-15 squad in a friendly match against Slovakia U-15. He scored his first international goal for Netherlands U15 two days later in another friendly match against Slovakia U-15 on 29 November 2007. That season De Sa went on two appear in three more friendly fixtures for Netherlands U-15. One against Belgium U-15, and two matches against Switzerland U-15. On 28 October 2008, he made his debut for the Netherlands U-16 in the 10th edition of the Tournoi de Val-de-Marne '08 in Paris, France, against Italy U-16. After his second appearance, a 1–0 away victory over the host nation France U-16, he then scored his first goal for the under-16 team in a match against Uruguay U-16 in the same tournament. He later appeared in two more friendly matches for Netherlands U-16 against both Ukraine U-16 and Ireland U-16.

De Sa made his debut for the Netherlands U-17 on 22 September 2009 in a friendly match against France U-17. He played a significant role for the under-17 teams 2010 UEFA European Under-17 Football Championship campaign, making a total of six appearances, while also competing in the La Manga Cup in Murcia, Spain, where he scored his first goal against Denmark U-17 in the 2–1 loss.

On 27 November 2010, he made his debut for the under-18 team against Romania U-18, making two further appearances for the Netherlands U-18 that season. On 19 May 2011, he debuted for the Netherlands U-19 in a 2011 UEFA European Under-19 Championship qualification match against Israel U-19, making a total of six appearances in the Dutch U-19 qualifying campaign, also appearing in three friendly matches for the under-19 team that season.

== Coaching career ==
After retiring from football in 2023, De Sa joined Ajax's under-14 team as an assistant coach under Frank Korpershoek.

== Career statistics ==
=== Club ===
As of 1 July 2016

Appearances and goals by club, season and competition
| Club | Season | League | | | Cup | | Continental^{1} | | Other^{2} | | Total | |
| Club | Season | Division | Apps | Goals | Apps | Goals | Apps | Goals | Apps | Goals | Apps | Goals |
|---|---|---|---|---|---|---|---|---|---|---|---|---|
| Ajax | 2011–12 | Eredivisie | 0 | 0 | 1 | 1 | 0 | 0 | 0 | 0 | 1 | 1 |
| Ajax | 2012–13 | Eredivisie | 1 | 0 | 0 | 0 | 0 | 0 | 0 | 0 | 1 | 0 |
| Ajax | 2013–14 | Eredivisie | 12 | 1 | 3 | 0 | 3 | 0 | 0 | 0 | 18 | 1 |
| Ajax | Total | | 13 | 1 | 4 | 1 | 3 | 0 | 0 | 0 | 20 | 2 |
| Jong Ajax | 2013–14 | Eerste Divisie | 17 | 7 | – | | – | | – | | 17 | 7 |
| Go Ahead Eagles | 2014–15 | Eredivisie | 16 | 1 | 1 | 0 | 0 | 0 | 1 | 0 | 18 | 1 |
| Willem II | 2015-16 | Eredivisie | 18 | 0 | 2 | 1 | 0 | 0 | 0 | 0 | 20 | 1 |
| Career total | | | 64 | 9 | 7 | 2 | 3 | 0 | 1 | 0 | 75 | 11 |

^{1} Includes UEFA Champions League and UEFA Europa League matches.

^{2} Includes Johan Cruijff Shield and Play-off matches.
