= Geoffrey Castillion =

Dutch professional footballer

Personal information
- Full name: Geoffrey Wynton Mandelano Castillion
- Date of birth: 25 May 1991 (age 35)
- Place of birth: Amsterdam, Netherlands
- Height: 1.91 m (6 ft 3 in)
- Position: Striker

Youth career
- RKSV TOB
- –2005: DWS
- 2005–2010: Ajax

Senior career*
Years	Team	Apps	(Gls)
2010–2014	Ajax	1	(0)
2011–2012	→ RKC (loan)	29	(6)
2012–2013	→ Heracles (loan)	30	(3)
2013	→ Jong Ajax	6	(1)
2014	→ NEC (loan)	7	(2)
2014	New England Revolution	1	(0)
2015	Universitatea Cluj	11	(0)
2015–2017	Debrecen	22	(3)
2016	→ Puskás Akadémia (loan)	8	(0)
2017	Víkingur Reykjavík	16	(11)
2018–2019	FH	10	(1)
2018	→ Víkingur Reykjavík (loan)	8	(6)
2019	→ Fylkir (loan)	19	(10)
2020–2021	Persib Bandung	16	(5)
2021	→ Como 1907 (loan)	1	(0)
2024	Ægir	8	(1)

International career
2007–2008	Netherlands U17	10	(9)
2008–2009	Netherlands U18	2	(1)
2009–2010	Netherlands U19	6	(2)
- * Club domestic league appearances and goals as of 20:31, 8 December 2021 (UTC)

Geoffrey Wynton Mandelano Castillion (born 25 May 1991) is a Dutch professional footballer who plays as a striker. Besides the Netherlands, he has played in the United States, Romania, Hungary, Iceland, Indonesia and Italy.

== Early and personal life ==
He is of Surinamese descent.

== Club career ==
=== Ajax ===
Born in Amsterdam, Castillion began his career with RKSV TOB and DWS. He was then scouted and recruited to join the youth ranks of AFC Ajax in 2005. He occasionally played in the Beloften Eredivisie with Ajax's reserve team while still playing their youth teams. Castillion made his debut for the first team on 20 March 2011, in the 3–2 loss against ADO Den Haag in the Eredivisie.

==== Loan spells ====
In August 2011, after his first season with the first team of Ajax, it was decided that Castillion would go out on loan to RKC Waalwijk for the duration of the 2011–12 season. He made his debut for RKC Waalwijk on 7 August 2011, and two weeks later scored his first Eredivisie goal while playing for RKC Waalwijk. In total Castillion made 29 league appearances for the club from North Brabant, while scoring a total of six goals during league play.

For the 2012–13 season, Castillion was sent out on loan a second time, this time around to Heracles Almelo, he was given the shirt number 21 coming off the bench at the start of the season, securing a starting position by November of that year. On 18 November 2012, Castillion scored his first goal for Heracles Almelo, scoring the 4th goal in a 5–1 victory at home against Roda JC Kerkrade. On 23 March 2013 Castillion extended his contract with AFC Ajax until 2014.

On 17 January 2014, it was announced that Castillion was sent on loan to NEC until the end of the season.

=== New England Revolution ===
On 25 August 2014, Castillion signed with New England Revolution of Major League Soccer. In an interview after signing, Castillion stated he hoped to "improve the level of MLS and the team." He would play approximately 14 minutes in his sole appearance in the league.

On 8 December 2014, he was traded to the Colorado Rapids together with goalkeeper Joe Nasco, then released by Rapids who decided not to exercise his contract.

=== Universitatea Cluj ===
On 7 January 2015, he signed a contract until June 2016 with Liga I club Universitatea Cluj. He made his league debut under manager George Ogăraru on 22 February 2015, in a 3–0 home loss against Târgu Mureş.

=== Debreceni VSC ===
On 1 July 2015, he signed a four-year contract with Nemzeti Bajnokság I club Debreceni VSC.

=== Iceland ===
On 3 March 2017, he signed for Icelandic Úrvalsdeild side Víkingur Reykjavík. He signed for FH for the 2018 season. From 29 July 2018 to October 2018, he was loaned out to his former club Víkingur Reykjavík.

On 19 April 2019, Castillion was loaned out again, this time to Fylkir.

=== Persib Bandung ===
In February 2020, he signed for Indonesian club Persib Bandung. Castillion made his Persib debut in a pre-season 2020 Asia Challenge Cup against Malaysia Super League club Melaka United on 1 February, also scoring his first goals for the club. He made his league debut for Persib Bandung on 1 March in a win 3–0 against Persela Lamongan. He also scored his first league goal for Persib in 2020 Liga 1, where he scored in the 38th minute.

He moved on loan to Como 1907 in February 2021. Castillion made his league debut in a 3–0 loss against Olbia Calcio 1905 on 14 April as a substitute for Franco Ferrari in the 84th minute.

After his loan ended with Como 1907 he returned to Persib.

On 11 September 2021, Castillion made his league debut of the 2021–22 Liga 1, coming on as a substitute for Febri Hariyadi in the 70th minute. On 30 October, Castillion scored his first league goals of the season in a 3–0 win over Persipura Jayapura.

On 14 December 2021, Castillion contract at Persib Bandung is officially not renewed.

== International career ==
Castillion made his International debut in an UEFA European Under-17 Championship qualifying match for the Netherlands U-17 against Albania U-17 on 23 October 2007. The match ended in 3–0 victory for the Dutch. He played for the Dutch U-18 team on 19 November 2008 in a friendly encounter against Belgium U-18, a match which ended in 0–3 loss to the Belgians. He scored the only goal for the Netherlands U18, in his second appearance on 11 February 2009 against Luxembourg U-18, the match ended in 2–1 loss for the Dutch.

== Career statistics ==
As of 1 March 2015

Club	Season	League			National Cup		Other		Total	
Club	Season	Division	Apps	Goals	Apps	Goals	Apps	Goals	Apps	Goals
Ajax	2010–11	Eredivisie	1	0	0	0	0	0	1	0
RKC Waalwijk (loan)	2011–12	Eredivisie	29	6	4	1	0	0	33	7
Heracles Almelo (loan)	2012–13	Eredivisie	30	3	3	1	0	0	33	4
Jong Ajax	2013–14	Eerste Divisie	6	1	0	0	0	0	6	1
NEC (loan)	2013–14	Eredivisie	7	2	2	0	0	0	9	2
New England Revolution	2014	Major League Soccer	1	0	0	0	0	0	1	0
Universitatea Cluj	2014–15	Liga I	2	0	0	0	0	0	2	0
Career total			76	12	7	2	0	0	83	14
