= Boban Lazić =

Bosnian footballer

Personal information
- Full name: Boban Lazić
- Date of birth: 29 January 1994 (age 32)
- Place of birth: Woerden, Netherlands
- Height: 1.75 m (5 ft 9 in)
- Positions: Forward; right winger

Team information
- Current team: Rohda '76

Youth career
- 2000–2004: ARC
- 2004–2013: Ajax

Senior career*
| Years | Team | Apps | (Gls) |
| 2013–2014 | Ajax | 0 | (0) |
| 2013–2014 | Jong Ajax | 10 | (1) |
| 2014–2015 | Olympiacos | 0 | (0) |
| 2015–2016 | PEC Zwolle | 5 | (0) |
| 2016 | → VVV-Venlo (loan) | 2 | (0) |
| 2016–2017 | FC Oss | 32 | (4) |
| 2021 | Teleoptik | 0 | (0) |
| 2022 | BVV | 15 | (0) |
| 2022– | Rohda '76 | | |

International career
| 2010–2011 | Netherlands U17 | 3 | (0) |
| 2015 | Bosnia and Herzegovina U21 | 1 | (0) |
- * Club domestic league appearances and goals as of 21 May 2017

Boban Lazić (born 29 January 1994) is a Dutch footballer who plays as a forward or right winger. He was eligible for national teams of Bosnia and Herzegovina, Serbia and had already played for Netherlands U-17.

However, in 2013 Lazić had discussed his future in talks with Vlado Jagodić, then manager of Bosnian U21 national team, in which he expressed his firm decision to play for Bosnia and Herzegovina.

== Club career ==
=== Ajax ===
Born in Woerden, in the Netherlands, to a Bosnian-Serb family, Lazić was recruited from ARC into the Ajax Academy in 2004 at age 10. During the 2011–12 season, Lazić was playing for the Ajax A1 squad, the team's highest youth level, winning the Nike Eredivisie league title, as well finishing as runners-up to Inter Milan in the NextGen Series (the Champions League equivalent for under-20 teams) after losing on penalties (5–3) following a 1–1 deadlock after extra time. Lazic would be the first choice on the right wing for head coach Wim Jonk that season, playing alongside the likes of Viktor Fischer, Danzell Gravenberch and Davy Klaassen.

He signed his first professional contract with Ajax on 31 May 2012, a three-year contract binding him to the Amsterdam club until the summer of 2015. The following season saw Lazić playing in the Beloften Eredivisie for the club's reserve squad Jong Ajax, not receiving any call-ups for the first team. He made his first appearance for the first team the following year on 13 July 2013 in a pre-season friendly encounter against RKC Waalwijk. Coming on as a substitute in the 60th minute, Lazić scored the final goal in the 78th minute off an assist from Bojan Krkić, who was on loan from FC Barcelona. The match ended in a 5–1 away victory for Ajax at the Mandemakers Stadion in Waalwijk. Ahead of the 2013–14 season, Jong Ajax were promoted to the Eerste Divisie, the second tier of professional football in the Netherlands, which resulted in Lazić making his professional debut against MVV Maastricht on 16 August 2013. The match ended as an away loss for Ajax, as they went down 1–0 in Maastricht. Lazić was brought in for Dejan Meleg in the 45th minute, playing for the second half of the fixture. He scored his first professional goal on 30 August 2013, scoring in the 65th minute in the 2–1 win against Jong Twente at Sportpark De Toekomst.

=== Olympiacos ===
On the last day of the winter transfer window of the 2013–14 season, on 31 January 2014 it was announced that Lazić was released from his contract with Ajax, following a trial period with Ligue 1 side Stade Rennais. He then signed a six-month contract with Olympiacos, with an option for an additional two years, joining the first team of the club from Piraeus.

=== PEC Zwolle ===
Sidelined by an injury for the duration of the 2014–15 Super League season in Greece, Lazić returned to the Netherlands, signing a contract with Eredivisie side PEC Zwolle.

He was sent on loan to VVV-Venlo in January 2016, but returned to Zwolle after only 2 sub appearances. In March 2017 he moved to Eerste Divisie side FC Oss.

=== FK Teleoptik ===
After almost five years away from football, Lazic came out of retirement to play for FK Teleoptik from July 2021 until November of the same year.

=== BVV Barendrecht ===
He signed a contract with the Dutch team BVV Barendrecht on 3 February 2022.

== International career ==
Lazić received his first International call-ups for the Netherlands U-15 team, making four appearances in friendly fixtures for the Dutch, while scoring once. He then participated in the Netherlands under-17 team qualification rounds ahead of the 2011 UEFA European Under-17 Championship in Serbia, and played two games.

After prolonged absence from football, caused by injury complications, Lazić finally received call by Bosnian U-21 manager for the qualification game against Kazakhstan on 2 September 2015.

== Personal life ==
Lazić has an older cousin, Vlatko Lazić, who is a professional footballer currently playing as a wing-back for Eerste Divisie side De Graafschap.

== Career statistics ==
=== Club performance ===
As of 28 November 2013

| Club performance | | | League | | Cup | | Continental^{1} | | Other^{2} | | Total | |
| Season | Club | League | Apps | Goals | Apps | Goals | Apps | Goals | Apps | Goals | Apps | Goals |
| Netherlands | | | League | | KNVB Cup | | Europe | | Other | | Total | |
|---|---|---|---|---|---|---|---|---|---|---|---|---|
| 2013–14 | Jong Ajax | Eerste Divisie | 10 | 1 | — | | | | | | 10 | 1 |
| Greece | | | League | | Greek Cup | | Europe | | Other | | Total | |
| 2013–14 | Olympiacos | Super League | 0 | 0 | 0 | 0 | 0 | 0 | 0 | 0 | 0 | 0 |
| Total | Netherlands | | 10 | 1 | 0 | 0 | 0 | 0 | 0 | 0 | 10 | 1 |
| Total | Greece | | 0 | 0 | 0 | 0 | 0 | 0 | 0 | 0 | 0 | 0 |
| Career total | | | 10 | 1 | 0 | 0 | 0 | 0 | 0 | 0 | 10 | 1 |

^{1} Includes UEFA Champions League and UEFA Europa League matches.

^{2} Includes Johan Cruijff Shield and Play-off matches.

== Honours ==
=== Club ===
Ajax A1 (Under-19)

- A-Junioren Eredivisie: 2011–12
- NextGen Series Runner-up: 2011–12
