= Sinan Keskin =

Dutch-Turkish footballer

Personal information
- Full name: Muhammet Sinan Keskin
- Date of birth: 13 August 1994 (age 32)
- Place of birth: The Hague, Netherlands
- Height: 1.80 m (5 ft 11 in)
- Position: Midfielder

Youth career
- 2002–2005: LenS
- 2005–2011: Haaglandia
- 2011–2013: Ajax

Senior career*
Years	Team	Apps	(Gls)
2013–2015	Jong Ajax	8	(0)
2015–2016	Jong FC Utrecht	0	(0)

International career^{‡}
2012	Turkey U18	1	(0)
2012	Netherlands U19	1	(0)
2012	Turkey U19	2	(0)
- * Club domestic league appearances and goals as of 10:49, 2 February 2018 (UTC) ‡ National team caps and goals as of 30 August 2013

Muhammet Sinan Keskin (born 13 August 1994) is a Dutch-Turkish professional footballer who plays as a midfielder.

== Club career ==
=== Early career ===
Born in The Hague, Netherlands, Keskin began his career in the youth ranks of local side Lenig en Snel. He then transferred to local Haaglandia before being recruited to join the Ajax Youth Academy.

=== Ajax ===
In his first season with Ajax, Keskin played for the Ajax A1 youth squad, helping the team to the finals of the NextGen Series, the Champions League equivalent for under-20 youth squads at age 18. Ajax lost the final to Inter Milan 5–3 on penalties after extra time, following a 1–1 draw in regulation time, and finished the tournament as runners-up. Keskin remained in the A1 (under-19) team the following season before he was promoted to the reserves team Jong Ajax a year later. On 27 January 2014, he made his professional debut for Jong Ajax in a 2–1 win over FC Oss in the Eerste Divisie.

=== FC Utrecht ===
On 19 May 2015, it was announced that Keskin had transferred to FC Utrecht.

== International career ==
Keskin holds both Turkish and Dutch citizenship and is still eligible to represent either team internationally. He was first called up to the Turkey national under-18 team for a friendly match. Keskin then appeared for the Netherlands national under-19 team in a 2–1 friendly match win over Scotland on 10 September 2012. He has since pledged his allegiance to Turkey and made two appearances for the under-19 team.

== Career statistics ==
As of 16 August 2014

Appearances and goals by club, season and competition
Club	Season	League			Total	
Club	Season	Division	Apps	Goals	Apps	Goals
Jong Ajax	2013–14	Eerste Divisie	6	0	6	0
Jong Ajax	2014–15	Eerste Divisie	2	0	2	0
Career total			8	0	8	0

== Honours ==
=== Club ===
Ajax A1 (under-19)

- Nike Eredivisie: 2011–12
- NextGen Series Runner-up: 2011–12
