= Melvin Vissers =

Dutch footballer

Personal information
- Full name: Melvin Vissers
- Date of birth: 11 February 1996 (age 30)
- Place of birth: The Hague, Netherlands
- Position: Midfielder

Youth career
- –2012: Sparta Rotterdam
- 2012–2015: Ajax

Senior career*
Years	Team	Apps	(Gls)
2013–2015	Jong Ajax	2	(0)
2015–2016	Sparta Rotterdam	5	(1)

International career
2012–2013	Netherlands U17	5	(0)
- * Club domestic league appearances and goals as of 7 June 2016

Melvin Vissers (born 11 February 1996) is a Dutch footballer who plays as a midfielder.

== Club career ==
On 30 March 2012, Vissers signed a three-year contract with Ajax, tying him down to the club until 30 June 2015. He made his debut for Jong Ajax as a 61st-minute substitute for Davy Klaassen in an Eerste Divisie match against Achilles '29 on 8 September 2013. In the Summer of 2015, Vissers returned to Sparta Rotterdam having won the Dutch under-19 league title twice with Ajax A1, having made two appearances in the Eerste Divisie for the reserves team Jong Ajax as well.

== Career statistics ==
As of 12 August 2014

Club statistics
Club	Season	League			Total	
Club	Season	Division	Apps	Goals	Apps	Goals
Jong Ajax	2013–14	Eerste Divisie	2	0	2	0
Career total			2	0	2	0

== Honours ==
=== Club ===
Ajax A1 (under-19)

- A-Junioren Eredivisie (2): 2013–14, 2014–15

Sparta Rotterdam

- Eerste Divisie: 2015-16
