= Ricardo Kishna =

Dutch footballer

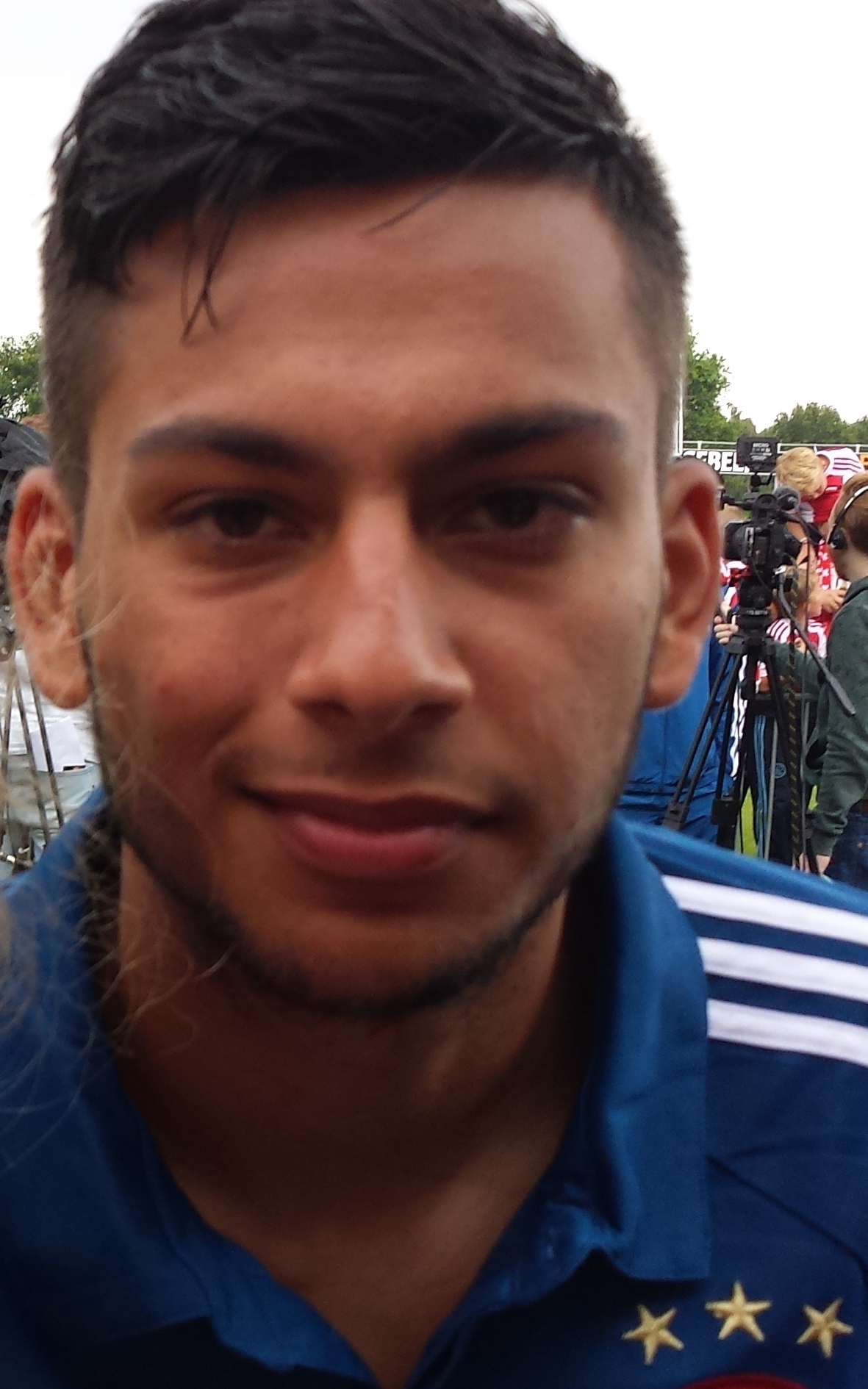
- Kishna in 2014

Personal information
- Full name: Ricardo Dennie Kishna
- Date of birth: 4 January 1995 (age 31)
- Place of birth: The Hague, Netherlands
- Height: 1.79 m (5 ft 10 in)
- Positions: Left winger; striker

Youth career
- 2001–2010: ADO Den Haag
- 2010–2014: Ajax

Senior career*
Years	Team	Apps	(Gls)
2013–2015	Ajax	34	(6)
2014–2015	Jong Ajax	9	(3)
2015–2020	Lazio	16	(2)
2017	→ Lille (loan)	11	(0)
2017–2019	→ ADO Den Haag (loan)	2	(0)
2020–2022	ADO Den Haag	37	(4)
2022–2023	ADO Den Haag	21	(0)

International career
2009–2010	Netherlands U15	5	(3)
2010	Netherlands U16	3	(2)
2014	Netherlands U20	1	(0)
2014–2016	Netherlands U21	10	(7)
- * Club domestic league appearances and goals as of 20 June 2023

Ricardo Dennie Kishna (born 4 January 1995) is a Dutch professional footballer who plays as a forward.

== Club career ==
=== Ajax ===
Born in The Hague, Kishna joined Ajax in 2010 from ADO Den Haag at 15 years old, where he had been active in the youth ranks from the age of 9 laying the foundation for his professional career. On 13 May 2011, Kishna signed his first professional contract with Ajax, joining the club until June 2014. He began the 2013–14 season playing for Ajax A1, the club's under-19 team, competing in the Nike A-Juniors Eredivisie and the UEFA Youth League. On 3 January 2014 it was then announced that Kishna, Jaïro Riedewald and Riechedly Bazoer would join the first team on its training camp in Turkey during the Winter transfer window. After making his debut with the first team in the Antalya Cup, a friendly tournament, on 11 January 2014 against Turkish side Trabzonspor, head coach Frank de Boer announced that Kishna would not be returning to the under-19 selection after the Winter break. But would join the reserves team Jong Ajax in the Dutch Eerste Divisie, while making appearances for the first team. On 15 January 2014 it was announced that Kishna had extended his contract with Ajax for an additional two seasons, now running until the Summer of 2016, with an option for an additional year.

He made his professional debut on 17 January 2014 playing for Jong Ajax in the 4–0 away loss against FC Emmen. He was substituted off in the match for Abdel Malek El Hasnaoui in the 59th minute. He scored his first professional goal for Jong Ajax on 10 February 2014 in a 4–1 home win over VVV-Venlo scoring in the 52nd minute. He then scored again in the following match against first place in the league table FC Dordrecht, leveling the score 1–1, and helping the reserves team to secure a point. On 19 February 2014 Frank de Boer announced that Kishna was selected as a member of the 18-man squad ahead of the UEFA Europa League match at home against Red Bull Salzburg, marking the first time he would be selected for the first team in a professional match. He then made his professional debut on 20 February 2014 against Red Bull Salzburg, replacing Kolbeinn Sigþórsson in the 60th minute in the 0–3 home defeat. He made his Eredivisie debut for the first team three days later in the 4–0 home victory over neighboring AZ, scoring on his league debut in the 61st minute, after being substituted on for Bojan Krkić in the 46th minute of the North Holland derby match.

=== Lazio ===
On 29 July 2015, Kishna joined Lazio on a four-year contract from Ajax. The reported transfer fee paid to Ajax was €4 million. He scored his first goal on his debut, a 2–1 win over Bologna on 22 August.

==== Lille (loan) ====
On 31 January 2017, Kishna joined Ligue 1 side Lille OSC on loan with an option given to Lille to sign him permanently.

==== ADO Den Haag (loan) ====
On 31 August 2017, Kishna signed for his former youth club ADO Den Haag on a season-long loan deal. On 31 August 2018, Kishna joined ADO Den Haag for the second time until 30 June 2019. After three years out due to a knee injury, he finally returned to the pitch in November 2020 coming on as a substitute in an Eredivisie match against Heerenveen.

== International career ==
Kishna made his debut for the Netherlands national team in the youth ranks, appearing for the under-15 selection in an International friendly match against Turkey U-15 on 8 December 2009. The match ended in a 2–1 victory at home for the Dutch. He then went on to make four more appearances for the under-15 side. He made his debut for the Netherlands U-16 side on 26 October 2010 in the Tournoi du Val-de-Marne in Paris, France, playing against France U-16 in a 1–2 away win. Making two further appearances, while scoring once.

== Personal life ==
Born in The Hague, Kishna is of Surinamese-Dutch descent, with his father being of Indo-Surinamese origin and his mother from the Netherlands.

== Career statistics ==
=== Club ===
As of 4 April 2021

Appearances and goals by club, season and competition
Club	Season	Division	League		Cup		Continental		Other		Total	
Club	Season	Division	Apps	Goals	Apps	Goals	Apps	Goals	Apps	Goals	Apps	Goals
Jong Ajax	2013–14	Eerste Divisie	6	2	0	0	0	0	0	0	6	2
Jong Ajax	2014–15	Eerste Divisie	3	1	0	0	0	0	0	0	3	1
Jong Ajax	Total		9	3	0	0	0	0	0	0	9	3
Ajax	2013–14	Eredivisie	8	6	1	2	1	0	0	0	10	8
Ajax	2014–15	Eredivisie	26	5	3	1	8	0	0	0	38	6
Ajax	Total		34	11	4	5	9	9	1	2	48	37
Lazio	2015–16	Serie A	11	2	0	0	4	4	1	0	16	2
Lazio	2016–17	Serie A	5	0	0	0	0	0	0	0	5	0
Lazio	Total		16	2	0	0	4	4	1	0	21	18
Lille (loan)	2016–17	Ligue 1	11	0	2	0	—		—		13	6
ADO Den Haag (loan)	2017–18	Eredivisie	2	0	0	0	—		—		2	0
ADO Den Haag (loan)	2018–19	Eredivisie	34	17	0	0	—		—		34	17
ADO Den Haag (loan)	Total		36	17	0	0	0	0	0	0	36	17
ADO Den Haag	2020–21	Eredivisie	15	6	0	0	—		—		15	6
Career total			113	67	6	1	13	8	2	0	134	82

^{1} Includes UEFA Champions League and UEFA Europa League matches.
^{2} Includes Johan Cruijff Shield and Supercoppa Italiana matches.

== Honours ==
=== Club ===
Ajax

- Eredivisie: 2013–14
- Eusébio Cup: 2014
