= Abdel Malek El Hasnaoui =

Dutch footballer (born 1994)

Personal information
- Date of birth: 9 February 1994 (age 32)
- Place of birth: Amsterdam, Netherlands
- Height: 1.81 m (5 ft 11 in)
- Position: Midfielder

Youth career
- –2002: VVA/Spartaan
- 2002–2013: Ajax

Senior career*
Years	Team	Apps	(Gls)
2013–2015	Ajax	0	(0)
2013–2015	→ Jong Ajax	33	(2)
2015–2016	PEC Zwolle	15	(0)
2017–2018	Jong AZ	11	(1)
2018	Eindhoven	14	(0)
2018	CR Al Hoceima	3	(0)
2019–2020	Sportlust '46	10	(2)
2020–2022	OFC	15	(5)
2022	Al-Nasr		
2023–2024	Ajax Amateurs		
2024–2025	AGB		

International career
2012–2013	Netherlands U19	3	(0)
- * Club domestic league appearances and goals as of 02:13, 4 February 2026 (UTC)

Abdel Malek El Hasnaoui (pronunciation: [ʕæbdɛlˈmælɪk ʔɛlˈħæsnawi]; born 9 February 1994) is a Dutch professional footballer who plays as a midfielder.

== Club career ==
Born in Amsterdam, El Hasnaoui joined the Ajax Academy in 2002. He began his early career as an attacking midfielder but also frequently played as a winger. In the 2011–12 season, El Hasnaoui helped his Ajax A1 youth team win the Nike Eredivisie league title as well as finish runners-up to Inter Milan in the NextGen Series after losing on penalties (5–3) following a 1–1 deadlock after extra time.

El Hasnaoui signed his first professional contract on 31 May 2012, in a two-year deal binding him to the club until 30 June 2014. He played for Jong Ajax in the 2012–13 Beloften Eredivisie season. Jong Ajax were promoted to the Eerste Divisie for the 2013–14 season and El Hasnaoui made his professional debut in a 2–1 league win over Jong Twente on 30 August 2013.

On 2 September 2019 it was confirmed, that El Hasnaoui had joined Dutch Hoofdklasse club Sportlust '46.

On 30 January 2022, El Hasnoui signed with Omani club Al-Nasr. On 22 May 2023, he returned to Ajax where he would compete for the amateur team in the Vierde Divisie. El Hasnaoui joined AGB in 2024.

== International career ==
El Hasnaoui holds both Dutch and Moroccan citizenship and is eligible to represent either country at international level. He received his first Netherlands U-19 cap in a match against Malta on 9 October 2012.

== Career statistics ==
As of match played 19 January 2018

Appearances and goals by club, season and competition
Club	Season	League			KNVB Beker		Other		Total	
Club	Season	Division	Apps	Goals	Apps	Goals	Apps	Goals	Apps	Goals
Jong Ajax	2013–14	Eerste Divisie	26	2	—		—		26	2
Jong Ajax	2014–15	Eerste Divisie	7	0	—		—		7	0
Jong Ajax	Total		33	2	—		0	0	33	2
PEC Zwolle	2015–16	Eredivisie	15	0	1	0	0	0	16	0
Jong AZ	2017–18	Eerste Divisie	11	1	—		—		11	1
FC Eindhoven	2017–18	Eerste Divisie	2	0	0	0	0	0	2	0
Career total			61	3	1	0	0	0	62	3

== Honours ==
=== Club ===
Ajax A1 (under-19)

- Nike Eredivisie: 2011–12
- NextGen Series Runner-up: 2011–12
