= Tol (surname) =

Tol is a Dutch surname. Its origin may be patronymic or occupational (from "tollenaar", a tax or toll collector). It is very common in the town of Volendam in North Holland Notable people with this name include:

- Anthony Tol (1943–2014), Dutch philosopher and archivist
- Dick Tol (1934–1973), Dutch football striker
- Kees Tol (born 1987), Dutch football striker, nephew of Pier
- Leon Tol (born 1987), Dutch football defender
- Nick Tol (born 1989), Dutch football midfielder, son of Pier
- Pier Tol (born 1958), Dutch football forward
- Richard Tol (born 1969), Dutch climate economist
- Sonja Tol (born 1972), Dutch épée fencer

== See also ==
- Tola (name)
- Van Tol, Dutch surname
- Sergey Alexandrovich Tol (1848–1923), Russian count, civilian governor of St. Petersburg 1889–1903
