= Joeri de Kamps =

Dutch footballer (born 1992)

Personal information
- Date of birth: 10 February 1992 (age 34)
- Place of birth: Amsterdam, Netherlands
- Height: 1.76 m (5 ft 9 in)
- Position: Defensive midfielder

Team information
- Current team: Sepsi OSK
- Number: 67

Youth career
- JOS Watergraafsmeer
- –2000: Diemen
- 2000–2013: Ajax

Senior career*
Years	Team	Apps	(Gls)
2013	Jong Ajax	5	(0)
2013–2014	Ajax	0	(0)
2013–2014	→ Heerenveen (loan)	12	(0)
2014–2016	NAC Breda	35	(0)
2016–2022	Slovan Bratislava	130	(4)
2022	→ Sparta Rotterdam (loan)	14	(1)
2022–2023	Lechia Gdańsk	10	(0)
2023–2024	Sirius	13	(0)
2024–2025	Volos	26	(0)
2026–	Sepsi OSK	5	(0)

International career
2010–2011	Netherlands U19	6	(0)
2012	Netherlands U20	1	(0)
2013	Netherlands U21	1	(0)
- * Club domestic league appearances and goals as of 2 August 2026

Joeri de Kamps (born 10 February 1992) is a Dutch professional footballer who plays as a defensive midfielder for Liga I club Sepsi OSK.

== Club career ==
=== Ajax ===
De Kamps was born in Amsterdam, where he joined the youth ranks of his local neighborhood clubs JOS Watergraafsmeer and SV Diemen as a child. From here he was recruited into the Ajax Academy in 2000. Working his way up the echelons of the club, he signed his first professional contract with Ajax in April 2011, signing a two-year contract with Ajax running until the Summer of 2013.

On 22 October 2011, he received his first call up for the first team alongside his teammate Dico Koppers, ahead of the Klassieker match against arch-rivals Feyenoord in the 2011–12 Eredivisie season. Appearing on head coach Frank de Boer's 18-men selection for the fixture due to Ajax first choice defensive midfielder Eyong Enoh being sidelined with an injury. This resulted in Vurnon Anita moving over form the starting left back position to take his place, and Dico Koppers filling in as left back. De Kamps however sat on the bench for the entire match which ended a 1–1 draw in Amsterdam, thus postponing the players first team debut.

Still playing in the Beloften Eredivisie for the reserves team Jong Ajax during the 2012–13 campaign, de Kamps was given the number 42 shirt and was on Frank de Boer's list of registered players for the 2012–13 UEFA Champions League campaign, practicing with the first team in De Lutte during trainingscamp, and playing alongside them in friendly encounters during the pre-season.

On 5 March 2013, de Kamps extended his contract with Ajax which was on the verge of expiration, signing a three-year deal this time, binding him to Ajax until the Summer of 2016. After the promotion of the reserves team Jong Ajax to the Eerste Divisie ahead of the 2013–14 season, de Kamps finally made his professional debut on 5 August 2013 against SC Telstar in the season opener at the Amsterdam Arena which ended as a 2–0 victory for the Amsterdam side.

==== Heerenveen (loan) ====
On 1 September 2013, it was announced in De Telegraaf, that de Kamps would join his teammate Mitchell Dijks for a season long loan spell with SC Heerenveen lasting until 30 June 2014. De Kamps, made a total of 13 appearances for the Frisian club, under manager Marco van Basten during the 2013–14 Eredivisie season.

=== NAC Breda ===
On 6 May 2014, it was announced that de Kamps would transfer to NAC Breda as a free transfer, due to the expiration of his contract in Amsterdam. De Kamps signed a three-year contract with the club from Breda. De Kamps made his official debut for NAC on 9 August 2014, during the first matchday of the Eredivisie, in a home game against Excelsior that ended in 1–1. He was in the starting eleven and was replaced by Joey Suk in the 83rd minute. De Kamps scored on 23 September 2014 in the KNVB Cup match against Spakenburg, which was won 4–3. He was responsible for scoring the 2–1 in the 43rd minute. De Kamps received his twelfth yellow card of the season on 25 April 2015, in the match against Heracles Almelo. In doing so, he equaled Guy Ramos' Eredivisie record from the 2011–12 season. With NAC, he relegated from the Eredivisie after the 2014–15 season. After the relegation, De Kamps barely received playing time during the first half of the season, partly due to a persistent tendon injury. This gave him the opportunity to look for another club from NAC.

=== Slovan Bratislava ===
At the beginning of January 2016, De Kamps moved to Slovak club Slovan Bratislava, where he signed a three-and-a-half-year contract. He made his debut for the club on 27 February 2016, away against league leaders AS Trenčín (2–0 away win). De Kamps was in the starting lineup and was replaced by Granwald Scott after more than an hour of play. He finished the year with Slovan Bratislava in second place in the Slovak Super Liga. De Kamps was the only Dutchman at the club at that time, but this changed in the run-up to the next season, as they signed Lorenzo Burnet, Lesly de Sa, Ruben Ligeon and Mitchell Schet in May and June 2016.

==== Loan to Sparta Rotterdam ====
On 20 January 2022, de Kamps joined Sparta Rotterdam in Eredivisie on loan with an option to buy.

=== Lechia Gdańsk ===
On 30 August 2022, Polish side Lechia Gdańsk announced the signing of de Kamps on a two-year contract with an extension option.

=== IK Sirius ===
After one season with Lechia, De Kamps left the Polish club and joined Swedish IK Sirius on a deal for the rest of 2023.

== International career ==
De Kamps received his first call up for the Dutch national team, when Cor Pot called him up for the Netherlands U-21 squad on 29 February 2012, when he appeared in a friendly encounter against Denmark U-21, ending in a 3−0 victory at home for Jong Oranje.

== Career statistics ==
As of 1 September 2026

Club	Season	League			National Cup (Note: Includes KNVB Beker, Slovak Cup, Polish Cup, Greek Cup, Cupa României)		Continental		Other		Total	
Club	Season	Division	Apps	Goals	Apps	Goals	Apps	Goals	Apps	Goals	Apps	Goals
Jong Ajax	2013–14	Eerste Divisie	5	0	—		—		—		5	0
Heerenveen (loan)	2013–14	Eredivisie	12	0	1	0	—		—		13	0
NAC Breda	2014–15	Eredivisie	29	0	3	1	—		2 (Note: Appearances in Eredivisie promotion/relegation play-offs)	0	34	1
NAC Breda	2015–16	Eerste Divisie	6	0	1	0	—		—		7	0
NAC Breda	Total		35	0	4	1	—		2	0	41	1
Slovan Bratislava	2015–16	Slovak First Football League	13	0	4	0	—		—		17	0
Slovan Bratislava	2016–17	Slovak First Football League	22	4	4	0	3 (Note: Appearances in UEFA Europa League)	0	—		29	4
Slovan Bratislava	2017–18	Slovak First Football League	19	0	4	0	4	1	—		27	1
Slovan Bratislava	2018–19	Slovak First Football League	23	0	1	0	2	0	—		26	0
Slovan Bratislava	2019–20	Slovak First Football League	19	0	6	0	13 (Note: Two appearances in UEFA Champions League, eleven appearances in UEFA Europa League)	0	—		38	0
Slovan Bratislava	2020–21	Slovak First Football League	28	0	6	0	1	0	—		35	0
Slovan Bratislava	2021–22	Slovak First Football League	6	0	3	0	9 (Note: Four appearances in UEFA Champions League, four appearances in UEFA Europa League, one appearance in UEFA Conference League)	0	—		18	0
Slovan Bratislava	Total		130	4	28	0	32	1	—		190	5
Sparta Rotterdam (loan)	2021–22	Eredivisie	14	1	—		—		—		14	1
Lechia Gdańsk	2022–23	Ekstraklasa	10	0	1	0	—		—		11	0
Sirius	2023	Allsvenskan	13	0	0	0	—		—		13	0
Volos	2023–24	Super League Greece	11	0	—		—		—		11	0
Volos	2024–25	Super League Greece	15	0	0	0	—		—		15	0
Volos	Total		26	0	0	0	—		—		26	0
Sepsi OSK	2025–26	Liga II	4	0	—		—		—		4	0
Sepsi OSK	2026–27	Liga I	1	0	1	0	—		—		2	0
Sepsi OSK	Total		5	0	1	0	—		—		6	0
Career total			250	5	35	1	32	1	2	0	319	7

== Honours ==
Slovan Bratislava

- Slovak First Football League: 2018–19, 2019–20, 2020–21
- Slovak Cup: 2016–17, 2017–18, 2019–20, 2020–21

Individual

- Slovak First Football League Team of the Season: 2020-21
