= Sam Hendriks =

Dutch footballer

Personal information
- Date of birth: 25 January 1995 (age 31)
- Place of birth: Doetinchem, Netherlands
- Height: 1.80 m (5 ft 11 in)
- Position: Striker

Youth career
- –2005: VV VIOD
- 2005–2012: De Graafschap

Senior career*
Years	Team	Apps	(Gls)
2012–2013	De Graafschap	1	(0)
2013–2016	Ajax	1	(0)
2013–2016	Jong Ajax	66	(20)
2016–2018	Go Ahead Eagles	60	(24)
2018–2020	OH Leuven	12	(0)
2019	→ Cambuur (loan)	14	(8)
2020	→ Cambuur (loan)	0	(0)
2020–2021	Go Ahead Eagles	35	(8)
2021–2022	Cambuur	6	(0)
2022	→ De Graafschap (loan)	15	(6)
2022–2023	Olympiakos Nicosia	33	(2)
2023–2024	Pyunik	25	(5)
Total		268	(73)

International career
2009–2010	Netherlands U15	2	(2)
2011	Netherlands U16	3	(0)
2013	Netherlands U18	1	(0)
2013	Netherlands U19	1	(0)
2014	Netherlands U20	1	(0)
2015	Netherlands U21	1	(0)
- * Club domestic league appearances and goals as of 6 March 2025

Sam Hendriks (born 25 January 1995) is a Dutch retired footballer who played as a striker.

== Club career ==
=== De Graafschap ===
Born in Doetinchem, Hendriks began his football career with local amateur side VV VIOD, before transferring to De Graafschap in 2005. Hendriks made his debut as an 88th-minute substitute for Anco Jansen against Telstar in the Eerste Divisie on 26 April 2013. Sidelined by a knee injury for the majority of the 2012–13 season, Hendriks only made one appearance for the first team.

=== Ajax ===
On 24 June 2013, Hendriks signed a four-year contract with Ajax. Hendriks made his debut for the reserves team Jong Ajax in a 2–0 Eerste Divisie loss to FC Oss on 16 August 2013. He came on for Marvin Höner in the 70th minute, playing as a striker. On 20 August 2013, Hendriks scored four goals for Jong Ajax in a 15–0 friendly match win over Tweede Klasse side RKSV Nemelaer. He scored his first professional career goal in the 22nd minute of a 1–2 loss to former club De Graafschap in the Eerste Divisie on 11 November 2013.

=== Go Ahead Eagles ===
On 15 June 2016, it was announced that Hendriks had signed a three-year deal with Go Ahead Eagles, leaving Ajax on a free transfer.

=== Return to Cambuur ===
On 15 June 2021, Hendriks returns to SC Cambuur. On 28 January 2022, Hendriks was loaned to De Graafschap for the rest of the season.

=== Olympiakos Nicosia ===
On 26 August 2022, he signed for Cypriot club Olympiakos Nicosia.

=== Pyunik ===
On 13 September 2023, Pyunik announced the singing of Hendriks. After leaving Pyunik due to injury, Hendriks moved to live on Bali and travelled through Asia.

== International career ==
Hendriks made his international debut for the Netherlands national under-15 team in a friendly match against Turkey on 8 December 2009. The match ended in a 4–1 win for the Netherlands. He scored his only goal in his final appearance for the U-15 team against Republic of Ireland in a 2–1 friendly match win. On 4 February 2011, he appeared in all three matches for the U-16 team in the 2011 International Youth Tournament in Portugal, making his debut against the hosts in a 2–0 win, playing in the 4–1 win over Israel two days later, followed by a 1–1 draw with Italy. On 26 March 2013, Hendrik was called up by U-18 coach Remy Reijnierse for the international friendly match against Germany on 26 March 2013. The match ended in a 4–1 victory for the Dutch. On 29 August, Hendriks was selected for the Netherlands U-19 team to face Germany in a friendly match. He made his U-19 debut on 6 September 2013 in a 6–1 loss to the Germans.

== Career statistics ==
As of 17 August 2014

Club statistics
Club	Season	League			KNVB Cup		Other		Total	
Club	Season	Division	Apps	Goals	Apps	Goals	Apps	Goals	Apps	Goals
De Graafschap	2012–13	Eerste Divisie	1	0	0	0	0	0	1	0
Jong Ajax	2013–14	Eerste Divisie	22	5	—		—		22	5
Career total			23	5	0	0	0	0	23	5

== Honours ==
Pyunik

- Armenian Premier League: 2023–24
