= Maurits Schmitz =

Dutch footballer

Personal information
- Full name: Maurits Climma Schmitz
- Date of birth: 31 March 1993 (age 33)
- Place of birth: Nieuwegein, Netherlands
- Height: 1.85 m (6 ft 1 in)
- Position: Goalkeeper

Youth career
- 2002–2013: Ajax

Senior career*
Years	Team	Apps	(Gls)
2013–2014	Jong Ajax	1	(0)
2014	Ajax Zaterdag	15	(0)
2015–2016	Go Ahead Eagles	0	(0)
2016–2017	Spakenburg		

International career
2008	Netherlands U15	3	(0)
2008	Netherlands U16	1	(0)
2009	Netherlands U17	1	(0)
- * Club domestic league appearances and goals

Maurits Schmitz (born 31 March 1993) is a Dutch former professional football player who plays as a goalkeeper.

== Career ==
=== AFC Ajax ===
Maurits Schmitz joined the youth ranks of AFC Ajax in 2002 where he progressed through the various ranks, signing his first professional contract in the summer of 2012. On 8 August 2013 his contract with Ajax was extended for another year, binding him to the club until the summer of 2014. He joined the reserves squad at first, having played for the A1 youth selection the previous season. He made his professional debut in the Dutch Eerste Divisie on 14 October 2013 against Fortuna Sittard, playing the full 90'-minutes in the 3–0 away loss.

In the summer of 2014, Schmitz became the first choice keeper for Ajax Zaterdag (Ajax 3), the newly promoted amateur team of Ajax, competing in the Topklasse, the third tier of professional football in the Netherlands. He made 15 league appearances while keeping two clean sheets. He also made one appearance in the first round of the KNVB Cup in a 4–0 win against De Valk.

=== Go Ahead Eagles ===
On 22 December 2014 it was announced that Schmitz would transfer to Eredivisie side Go Ahead Eagles from Deventer where he would become third choice goalkeeper behind Mickey van der Hart, who was serving a loan spell from Ajax, and second choice keeper Erik Cummins. He made no appearances in one season with the club, having been on the bench as second keeper for one match.

=== SV Spakenburg ===
In March 2016, Schmitz was released from the Eagles with no extension of his contract, leaving him to search for a new club. That same Month it was announced that Schmitz had signed with Dutch Tweede Divisie side SV Spakenburg.

== International career ==
Maurits Schmitz made his international debut playing for the Netherlands U-15 squad on 11 March 2008, in a friendly match against Belgium U-15, which ended in a 4–2 victory for the Dutch. He played in two more friendly fixtures for the under-15 squad, both against Switzerland U-15 which each ended in 0–2 losses at home only two days apart from each other. On 22 April 2008 Maurits Schmitz made his only appearance for the Netherlands U-16 squad in a friendly match against Northern Ireland U-16, playing the full 90'-minutes in the 2–0 home win. On 24 September 2009 Schmitz made his debut and only appearance for the Netherlands U-17 team. He played the entire match in the friendly encounter against France U-17 which the Dutch won with a 2–1 victory.

== Statistics ==
=== Club performance ===
As of 2014-12-22

Club performance			League		Cup		Continental^{1}		Other^{2}		Total	
Season	Club	League	Apps	Goals	Apps	Goals	Apps	Goals	Apps	Goals	Apps	Goals
Netherlands			League		KNVB Cup		Europe		Other		Total	
2013–14	Jong Ajax	Eerste Divisie	1	0	–	–	–	–	–	–	1	0
2014–15	Ajax Zaterdag	Topklasse	15	0	1	0	–	–	–	–	16	0
2014–15	Go Ahead Eagles	Eredivisie	0	0	0	0	–	–	–	–	0	0
2015–16	Go Ahead Eagles	Eerste Divisie	0	0	0	0	–	–	–	–	0	0
2016–17	Spakenburg	Tweede Divisie	0	0	0	0	–	–	–	–	0	0
Total	Netherlands		16	0	1	0	–	–	–	–	17	0
Career total			16	0	1	0	–	–	–	–	17	0

^{1} Includes UEFA Champions League and UEFA Europa League matches.

^{2} Includes Johan Cruijff Shield and Play-off matches.
