= Ajax Hellas Youth Academy =

Ajax Hellas
- Full name: Ajax Hellas Youth Academy
- Founded: 15 March 2011
- Dissolved: 2016
- Ground: Camp Ajax Hellas, Corfu
- Capacity: 500
- Chairman: George Kazianis
- Manager: Eddie van Schaik
- Website: http://www.ajaxhellas.gr/
Home colours	Away colours

Ajax Hellas Youth Academy or Ajax Hellas for short was a football youth academy based in Corfu, Greece, from where the organization managed a total of 15 teams throughout Greece and Cyprus. The academy was established in 2011 by Dutch footballing giants Ajax Amsterdam.

== History ==
On 15 March 2011, the Dutch football club AFC Ajax opened their first youth academies outside of the Netherlands, when the team partnered up with George Kazianis and signing a five-year contract with All-Star Consultancy, to build a total of 15 youth academies throughout Greece and Cyprus. Based on the island of Corfu where the main facility Camp Ajax Hellas was situated, the academy was managed by Eddie van Schaik, who served as head coach and consultant, working to teach the Ajax footballing philosophy at the various training locations.

== Academies ==
Teams and academies

- (Greece) Ajax Aspropyrgou (Aspropyrgos)
- (Greece) Ajax Rethymnou (Rethymno)
- (Greece) Ajax Syrou (Syros)
- (Greece) Ajax Larisas (Larissa)
- (Greece) Ajax Peanias (Paiania)
- (Greece) Ajax Katerinis (Katerini)
- (Greece) Ajax Imathias (Imathia)
- (Greece) Ajax Gianitson (Giannitsa)
- (Greece) Ajax Iliou (Athens)
- (Greece) Ajax Renti (Agios Ioannis Rentis)

Single-academies

- (Greece) (Cyprus) "Themistocles" schools

== Coaches and staff ==
President

- (Greece) George Kazianis

Head coach

- (Netherlands) Eddie van Schaik

Technical Director

- (Netherlands) Arnold Mühren

Coordinator

- (Greece) Lampros Lionas

== Stadia ==
- Stadium at Camp Ajax Hellas, Corfu, Greece

== Notable former players ==
The goal of the Academy was to recruit Greek talents to the Ajax Youth Academy in Amsterdam.

- Dimitri Silvestridis was the first and only player to join the Ajax Youth Academy in Amsterdam via the Ajax Hellas Academy. He played for the B2 squad for one season, before returning to Greece and joining the youth ranks of Panathinaikos F.C.

== See also ==
- Ajax Youth Academy
