= Derwin Martina =

Dutch footballer (born 1994)

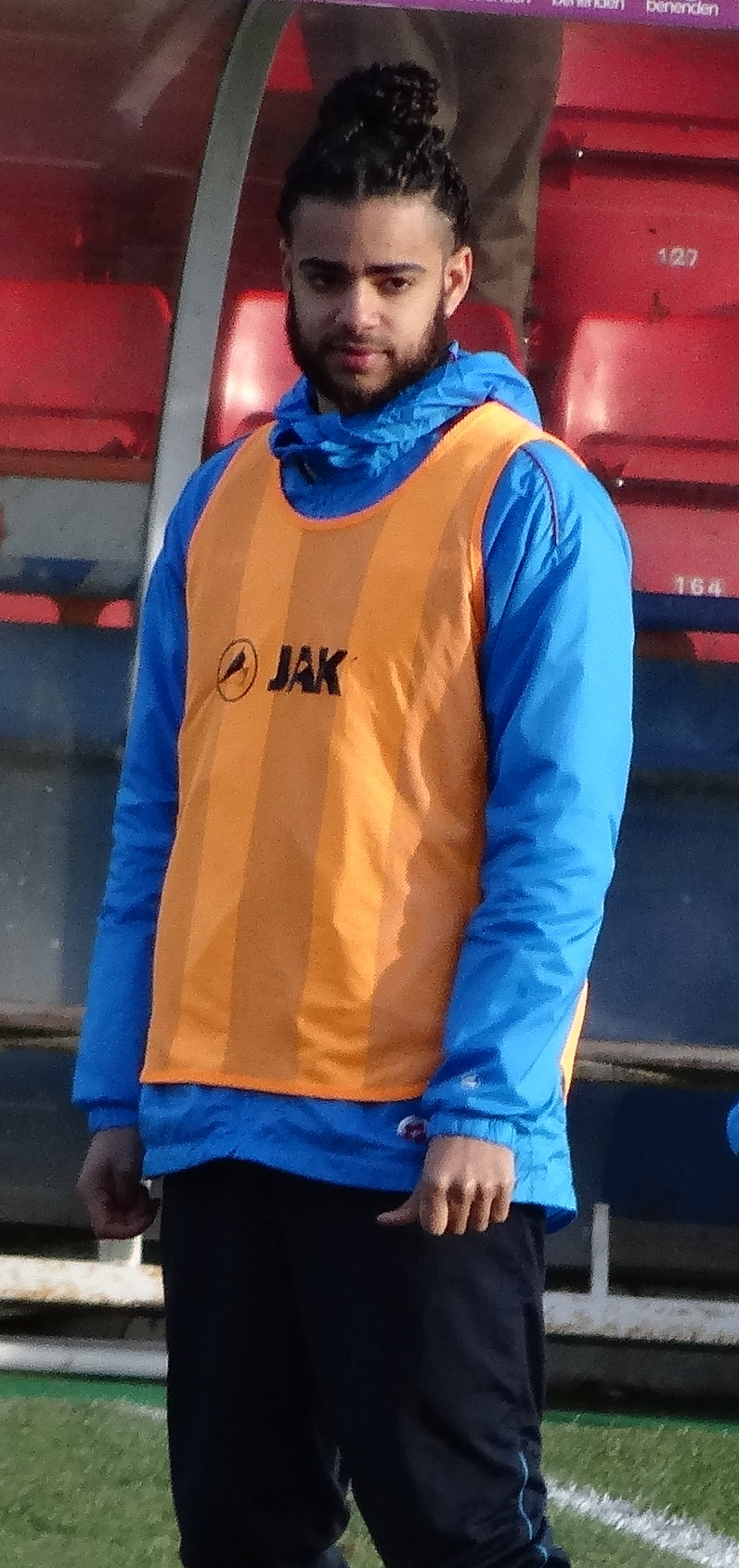
- Martina warming up for York City in 2017

Personal information
- Date of birth: 19 July 1994 (age 32)
- Place of birth: Amsterdam, Netherlands
- Height: 1.78 m (5 ft 10 in)
- Position: Right-back

Youth career
- 2008–2013: Ajax

Senior career*
Years	Team	Apps	(Gls)
2013–2014	Jong Ajax	17	(0)
2014–2016	RKC Waalwijk	16	(1)
2016	Atlantis FC	3	(0)
2017	York City	0	(0)
2017–2018	Achilles '29	25	(1)
2020	VV Noordwijk	1	(0)
2021–2022	OFC Oostzaan	3	(0)

International career
2013	Curaçao U20	2	(0)
- * Club domestic league appearances and goals as of 10:03, 26 October 2022 (UTC)

Derwin Martina (born 19 July 1994) is a professional footballer who plays as a right-back.

== Club career ==
=== Ajax ===
Martina was born in Amsterdam, joining the Ajax Academy in 2008. He began his career in the youth teams of Ajax as a forward, but was moved back to play as a defender later in his career. It was youth trainer Said Ouaali who had opted to move the young forward to a more defensive role, after which comparisons of the young right back were commonly made to Michael Reiziger due to their similar playing style. In July 2013, he signed a one-year professional contract with Ajax.

=== RKC Waalwijk ===
On 25 June 2014, RKC Waalwijk signed Martina from Ajax on a free transfer. Martina signed a two-year contract with an option for an additional season. On 8 August 2014, he made his debut for RKC Waalwijk in an Eerste Divisie match against Roda JC Kerkrade, playing the full 90 minutes in a 3–2 away loss. In October 2014, Martina contracted deep vein thrombosis on a trip to Curaçao to play for the national team. He made no further appearances until after the Winter break as a result. In January 2016, his contract was terminated. Due to injuries, he only played 16 matches for RKC Waalwijk. He had missed the entire beginning of the 2015–16 season due to his injuries.

=== Atlantis FC ===
In the summer of 2016, Martina signed with Kakkonen club Atlantis FC. In September 2016, he was investigated alongside fellow Dutch players Salah Aharar, Irvingly van Eijma and Ayoub Ait Afkir for match-fixing accusations. In December 2016, the players were found innocent, but that the club had been frequently bet on by several groups of match fixers at the same time, raising suspicions of foul play.

=== York City ===
On 3 March 2017, Martina signed for National League club York City on a contract until the end of 2016–17. Immediately after playing in a reserve-team match on 7 March 2017, he was released by the club.

=== Achilles '29 ===
On 15 June 2017, Martina signed for Tweede Divisie club Achilles '29. He left the club in July 2018.

=== VV Noordwijk ===
After being a free agent for 2 years after leaving Achilles '29 he signed for Tweede Divisie club VV Noordwijk on 18 June 2020.

=== OFC Oostzaan ===
On 1 July 2021, he signed for Derde Divisie club OFC Oostzaan. He left the club at the end of the season after they became champion and were promoted to the second division.

== International career ==
On 8 January 2013, Martina was called up by Curaçao national under-20 team coach Hans Schrijver for the 2013 CONCACAF U-20 Championship in Mexico. Martina appeared in two group stage matches against Mexico and El Salvador but failed to help his team advance past the group stage of the tournament. He received his first call ups for the senior team ahead of the second round of the 2014 Caribbean Cup qualifying series against Martinique, Guadeloupe and Saint Vincent and the Grenadines contested in Guadeloupe from 8 to 12 October 2014.

== Personal life ==
It had been reported that he was a brother to fellow footballers Cuco and Javier. However, he confirmed that he is not related to Cuco.

== Career statistics ==
As of match played 28 April 2018

Appearances and goals by club, season and competition
Club	Season	League			National cup		League cup		Other		Total	
Club	Season	Division	Apps	Goals	Apps	Goals	Apps	Goals	Apps	Goals	Apps	Goals
Jong Ajax	2013–14	Eerste Divisie	17	0	—		—		—		17	0
RKC Waalwijk	2014–15	Eerste Divisie	16	1	0	0	—		—		16	1
RKC Waalwijk	2015–16	Eerste Divisie	0	0	0	0	—		—		0	0
RKC Waalwijk	Total		16	1	0	0	—		—		16	1
Atlantis FC	2016	Kakkonen	3	0	—		—		—		3	0
York City	2016–17	National League	0	0	—		—		—		0	0
Achilles '29	2017–18	Tweede Divisie	21	0	2	0	—		—		23	0
Career total			57	1	2	0	0	0	0	0	59	1
