= Van Tol =

Van Tol is a Dutch toponymic surname meaning "from Tol". Many people with this name are descendants of Floris van Tol (fl. 1274), adviser to Floris V, Count of Holland, who was named after the hamlet Tol near Voorburg. People with the surname include:

- Dominicus van Tol (c.1635–1676), Dutch painter
- Gordon Van Tol (1960–2010), Canadian water polo player
- Hans van Tol (1940–2002), better known as Tol Hansse, Dutch singer and trumpetist, son of Jacques
- Herman van Tol, Dutch mixed martial artist
- Jacques van Tol (1897–1969), Dutch lyricist
- Jean-Marc van Tol (born 1967), Dutch cartoonist
- Rik van Tol (Initials: H.J.K. van Tol (Born 1972), Dutch Entrepreneur

== See also ==
- Tol (surname)
