= Freek Thoone =

Dutch footballer

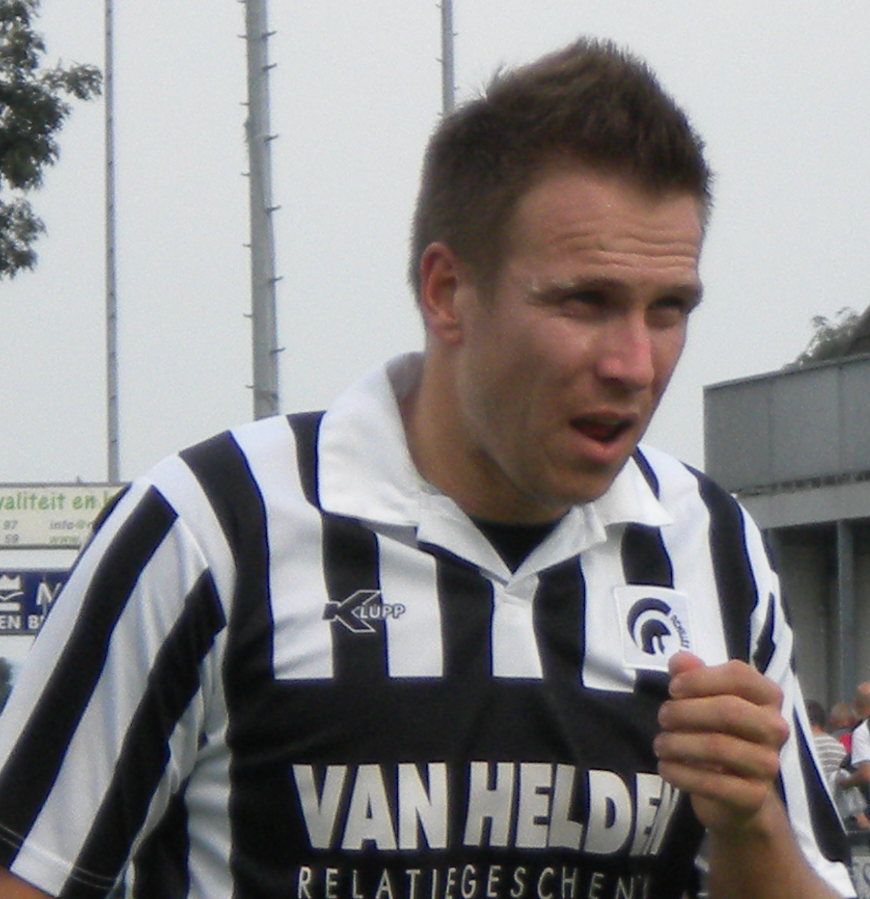

Personal information
- Date of birth: 29 June 1985 (age 41)
- Place of birth: Leunen, Netherlands
- Height: 1.79 m (5 ft 10 1/2 in)
- Position: Forward

Team information
- Current team: AWC Wijchen

Youth career
- SV Leunen

Senior career*
| Years | Team | Apps | (Gls) |
| 2002–2006 | SV Leunen | | |
| 2006–2012 | SV Venray | | |
| 2012–2017 | Achilles '29 | 156 | (43) |
| 2017– | AWC Wijchen | | |
- * Club domestic league appearances and goals as of 27 May 2017

Freek Thoone (born 29 June 1985) is a Dutch football player who plays for AWC Wijchen.

== Club career ==
He made his professional debut in the Eerste Divisie for Achilles '29 on 3 August 2013 in a game against FC Emmen.
