= Cor Geelhuijzen =

Dutch footballer (1929–2020)

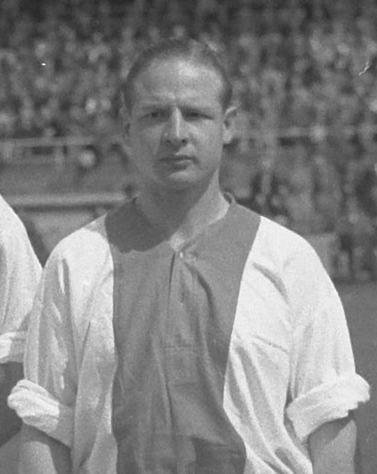
- Geelhuijzen in 1957

Personal information
- Full name: Cornelis Johannes Geelhuijzen
- Date of birth: 4 February 1929
- Place of birth: Amsterdam, Netherlands
- Date of death: 25 November 2020 (aged 91)
- Position: Defender

Youth career
- 1942–1954: Ajax

Senior career*
Years	Team	Apps	(Gls)
1954–1960	Ajax	125	(0)
- * Club domestic league appearances and goals

Cornelis Johannes Geelhuijzen (4 February 1929 – 25 November 2020) was a Dutch footballer who played as a defender for Ajax.

Geelhuijzen later worked as a tailor, trained amateur club De Foresters, and celebrated his 60th wedding anniversary in 2018.

He died on 25 November 2020, aged 91.

== Career statistics ==
Appearances and goals by club, season and competition
Club	Season	League		KNVB Cup		Other		Total	
Club	Season	Apps	Goals	Apps	Goals	Apps	Goals	Apps	Goals
Ajax	1953–54	1	0	—		—		1	0
Ajax	1954–55	26	0	—		—		26	0
Ajax	1955–56	30	0	—		—		30	0
Ajax	1956–57	34	0	2	0	—		36	0
Ajax	1957–58	26	0	—		2 (Note: Appearances in European Cup.)	0	28	0
Ajax	1958–59	0	0	1	0	—		1	0
Ajax	1959–60	8	0	—		—		8	0
Total		125	0	3	0	2	0	130	0

== Sources ==
- Vermeer, Evert; van Hoof, Marcelle (1999). Ajax 100 Jaar Jubileumboek 1900-2000 (in Dutch). Amsterdam: Luitingh-Sijthoff. ISBN 90-245-3497-6.
