= KNVB Reserve Cup =

Dutch football competition

The KNVB Reserve Cup (Dutch: KNVB Beker voor beloften) is a cup competition for the reserve teams of professional football clubs in the Netherlands. The winner qualifies for next year's KNVB Cup; if the cup winner is also the champion in the national competition for reserve teams (Dutch: Eredivisie voor beloften), the cup runner-up also qualifies for the KNVB Cup.

The cup competition was established in 1997. Until then, the teams played in the KNVB District Cup competitions, and competed for the KNVB Amateur Cup. From the 1997-98 season to the 2000-01 season, the reserve teams used the number 2 to distinguish them from the club's main squad. From 2001-02 onwards, the teams use the prefix Jong (Young). In 2012 the Reserve Cup was eliminated. in 2018 the Reserve cup was reinstated.

== Past winners ==
Year	Winner	Runner-up	Result	Note	Next year's KNVB Cup performance
1997–98	Vitesse 2	Sparta 2	2–2	Vitesse won after extra time.	Vitesse 2 and Sparta 2 were eliminated in the group stage of the KNVB Cup 1998-99.
1998–99	ADO Den Haag 2	RKC Waalwijk 2	3–2		
1999–2000	FC Utrecht 2	SC Heerenveen 2	2-0		FC Utrecht 2 was eliminated in the first round of the KNVB Cup 2000–01.
2000–01	PSV 2	FC Twente 2	0-0	PSV won 1–0 after extra time.	PSV 2 were eliminated in the first round of the KNVB Cup 2001–02.
2001–02	Jong Vitesse	Jong Willem II	2–1		Jong Vitesse were eliminated in the first round of the KNVB Cup 2002–03.
2002–03	Jong Ajax	Jong PSV	1–1	Ajax won after a penalty shootout.	Jong Ajax were eliminated in the round of 16 of the KNVB Cup 2003–04.
2003–04	Jong Ajax	Jong Feyenoord	3–2		Jong Ajax were eliminated in the first round of the KNVB Cup 2004–05, Jong Feyenoord were eliminated in the third round.
2004–05	Jong PSV	Jong Vitesse	2–0		Jong PSV won the first round tie of the KNVB Cup 2005–06, but were disqualified for fielding an ineligible player.
2005–06	Jong RKC Waalwijk	Jong AZ	1–0		Jong RKC Waalwijk were eliminated in the second round of the KNVB Cup 2006–07, Jong AZ were eliminated in the round of 16.
2006–07	Jong SC Heerenveen	Jong Stormvogels Telstar	4–0		Jong SC Heerenveen were eliminated in the round of 16 of the KNVB Cup 2007–08, Jong Stormvogels Telstar were eliminated in the second round.
2007–08	Jong PSV	Jong NEC	1–1	Jong PSV won the penalty shootout 2–0.	Jong PSV were eliminated by the PSV senior side in the second round of the 2008–09 KNVB Cup.
2008–09	Jong De Graafschap	Jong SC Heerenveen	4–3		Jong De Graafschap eliminated SC Cambuur in the second round of the 2009–10 KNVB Cup and defeated FC Zwolle after extra time in the third round. In the round of 16, NAC Breda eliminated Jong De Graafschap.
2025-2026	Jong De Graafschap	Jong Willem II	2-1		Game played at De Vijverberg, Doetinchem, attendance 3000.

== See also ==
- KNVB Cup
- Football in the Netherlands
