= Damiën Menzo =

Dutch footballer (born 1993)

Personal information
- Date of birth: 18 October 1993 (age 33)
- Place of birth: Amsterdam, Netherlands
- Height: 1.79 m (5 ft 10 in)
- Position: Winger

Team information
- Current team: De Dijk

Youth career
- FC Volendam

Senior career*
Years	Team	Apps	(Gls)
2012–2014	FC Volendam	34	(4)
2014–2015	AFC	19	(3)
2015–2017	De Dijk	?	(?)
2017–2018	OFC	?	(?)
2018–	De Dijk	14	(3)
- * Club domestic league appearances and goals as of 17 May 2018

Damiën Menzo (born 18 October 1993 in Amsterdam) is a Dutch professional footballer who plays in the Tweede Divisie for ASV De Dijk. He plays as a winger.

His uncle is the former AFC Ajax and Netherlands national football team goalkeeper Stanley Menzo.
