= Stijn de Looijer =

Dutch footballer

Personal information
- Full name: Stijn de Looijer
- Date of birth: 31 March 1992 (age 34)
- Place of birth: Schaijk, Netherlands
- Height: 1.89 m (6 ft 2 in)
- Position: Midfielder

Youth career
- –2002: DAW
- 2002–2010: FC Den Bosch

Senior career*
| Years | Team | Apps | (Gls) |
| 2010–2012 | Den Bosch | 14 | (0) |
| 2012–2014 | NEC | 0 | (0) |
| 2013–2014 | → Den Bosch (loan) | 15 | (1) |
| 2014 | JVC Cuijk | | |
| 2015–2017 | Blauw Geel '38 | | |
- * Club domestic league appearances and goals

Stijn de Looijer (born 31 March 1992) is a Dutch former professional footballer who played as a midfielder. He formerly played for FC Den Bosch and NEC.

== Career ==
De Looijer started his youth career with DAW in Schaijk before moving to the FC Den Bosch youth academy at age 10. He made his professional debut in the starting eleven of FC Den Bosch in an away match against Helmond Sport on 30 September 2011. In the summer of 2012, he was signed by rivals NEC, to the great dismay of the Den Bosch fans. In the 2013–14 season he played for Den Bosch again, this time on a loan deal. In late August 2014, he permanently left NEC and joined Topklasse club JVC Cuijk. When he was injured there at the end of September during a practice session with the second team, he ended his career.

On 28 May 2015, after a year where he focused on finishing his higher education (hbo) in engineering physics, De Looijer joined Blauw Geel '38 while simultaneously attending university to study biomechanical design. He left the club in 2017, to pursue an internship in Iceland as part of his studies.

== Personal life ==
After retiring from football, De Looijer has worked in robotics as an engineer.
