= Wesley Deenen =

Dutch footballer

Personal information
- Full name: Wesley Deenen
- Date of birth: 24 July 1993 (age 33)
- Place of birth: Venray, Netherlands
- Height: 1.77 m (5 ft 9 1/2 in)
- Position: Winger

Youth career
- SV Venray
- NEC

Senior career*
Years	Team	Apps	(Gls)
2012–2013	NEC	0	(0)
2012–2013	→ FC Oss (loan)	9	(0)
2013–2014	FC Oss	23	(1)
2014–2016	Germania Groesbeek		
2016–2018	SV Venray		
- * Club domestic league appearances and goals as of 18 June 2014 (UTC)

Wesley Deenen (born 24 July 1993, in Venray) is a Dutch footballer who plays as a right winger. He played for FC Oss in the Dutch Eerste Divisie.

== Club career ==
Deenen came through the N.E.C. youth system and joined FC Oss on loan in summer 2012. He made his professional debut on 31 August 2012 against Almere City and left Oss after the 2013/14 season.

He left Germania Groesbeek in summer 2016 for fellow amateurs SV Venray.
