= Daniël Breedijk =

Dutch footballer (born 1995)

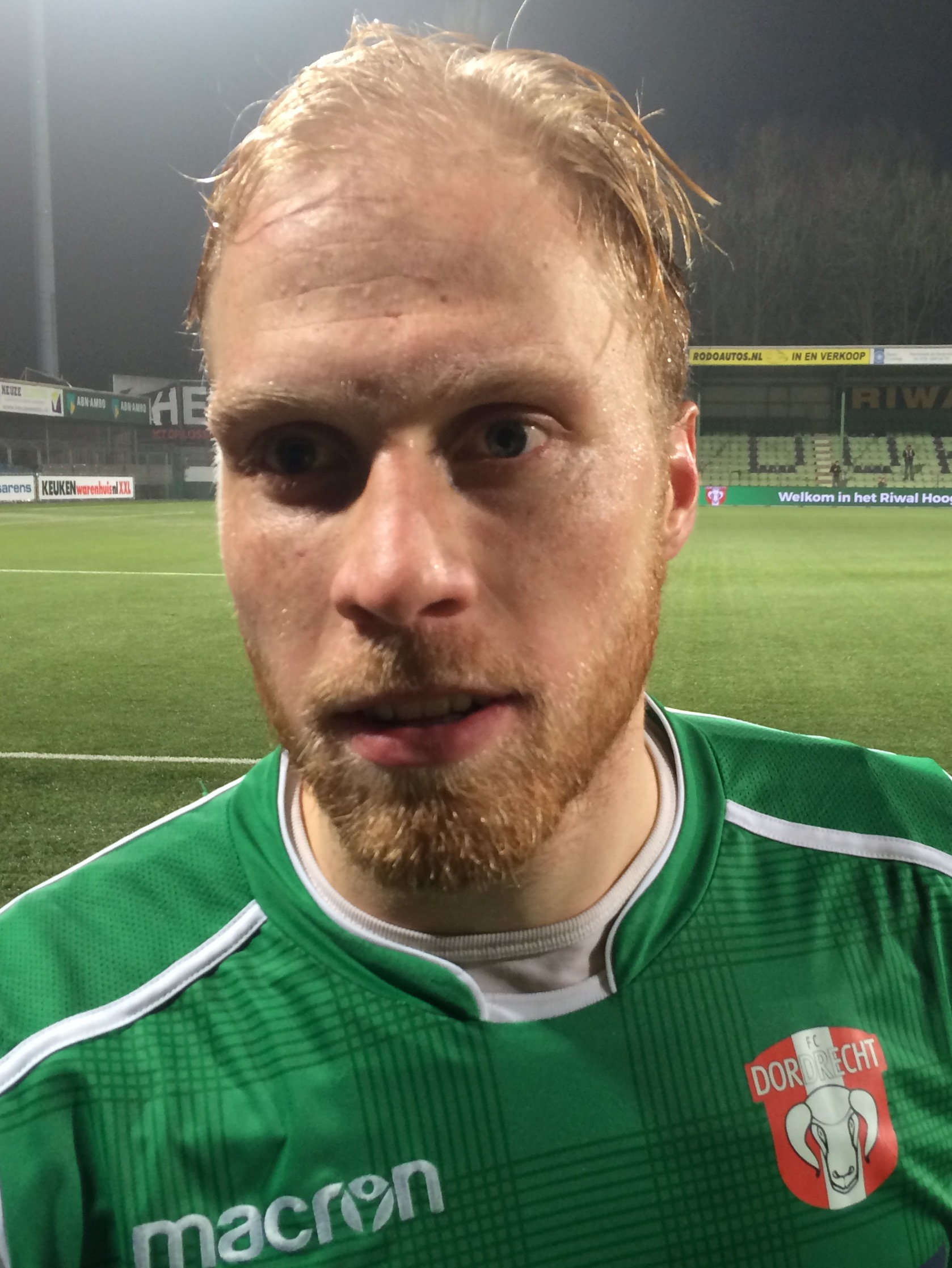

Personal information
- Date of birth: 13 February 1995 (age 31)
- Place of birth: Rotterdam, Netherlands
- Height: 1.87 m (6 ft 2 in)
- Position: Centre-back

Youth career
- BVCB
- Sparta

Senior career*
Years	Team	Apps	(Gls)
2013–2018	Sparta	50	(3)
2016–2018	Jong Sparta	19	(0)
2018–2020	Dordrecht	67	(4)
2020–2022	Almere City	31	(4)
2022–2023	Helmond Sport	0	(0)
Total		167	(11)

International career
2012	Netherlands U17	2	(0)
- * Club domestic league appearances and goals

Daniël Breedijk (born 13 February 1995) is a Dutch retired footballer who played as a centre-back.

== Club career ==
Born in Rotterdam, Breedijk grew up in Bergschenhoek where he joined local side BVCB. He was snapped up by Sparta Rotterdam and later played for FC Dordrecht and Almere City.

On 24 June 2022, Breedijk joined Helmond Sport on a one-year deal with an option for an additional season. He never appeared for Helmond Sport due to a knee injury and retired from playing in January 2023.

== International career ==
Breedijk played 2 games for the Netherlands national under-17 football team

== Honours ==
=== Club ===
Sparta Rotterdam

- Eerste Divisie: 2015-16
