= Gieljan Tissingh =

Dutch footballer

Personal information
- Full name: Gieljan Tissingh
- Date of birth: 19 April 1990 (age 36)
- Place of birth: Nunspeet, Netherlands
- Height: 1.83 m (6 ft 0 in)
- Position: Centre back

Youth career
- vv Nunspeet
- FC Zwolle

Senior career*
Years	Team	Apps	(Gls)
2009–2012	FC Zwolle	11	(0)
2012–2013	AGOVV Apeldoorn	18	(0)
2013	vv Nunspeet		
2013–2014	FC Oss	28	(1)
- * Club domestic league appearances and goals as of 18 June 2014 (UTC)

Gieljan Tissingh (born 19 April 1990 in Nunspeet) is a Dutch professional footballer who plays as a centre back. He is currently without a club after having formerly played for FC Zwolle, AGOVV Apeldoorn and FC Oss.
