= Marvin Höner =

German footballer

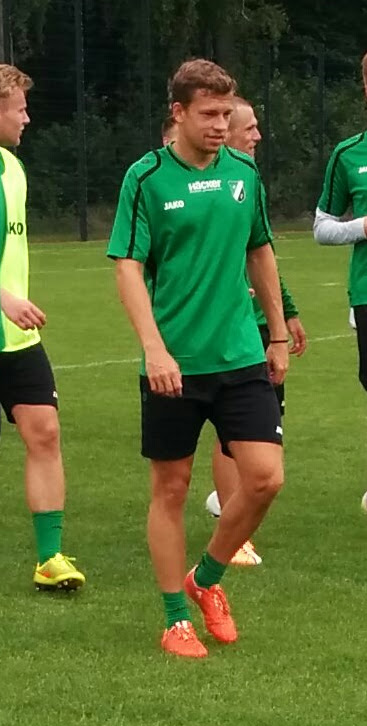
- Höner training with SV Rödinghausen in 2015

Personal information
- Date of birth: 4 May 1994 (age 32)
- Place of birth: Bielefeld, Germany
- Height: 1.78 m (5 ft 10 in)
- Position: Striker

Youth career
- VfL Theesen
- Arminia Bielefeld

Senior career*
Years	Team	Apps	(Gls)
2013–2015	Jong Ajax	7	(0)
2015–2017	SV Rödinghausen	34	(6)
2017–2021	VfL Theesen	55	(68)
2021–2022	Preußen Espelkamp		
2022–2023	VfL Theesen	1	(0)
Total		97+	(74+)

International career
2012	Germany U19	2	(0)
- * Club domestic league appearances and goals

Marvin Höner (born 4 May 1994) is a German former professional footballer who played as a striker.

== Club career ==
=== Arminia Bielefeld ===
Born in Bielefeld, Höner is an academy product of local 2. Bundesliga club Arminia Bielefeld. He played for the club's A-Juniors team in the 2012–13 Under 19 Bundesliga season, scoring ten goals in 12 matches. His performances for his club as well as for the German national under-19 team drew attention from several clubs, including Ajax. He was invited to a trial by Ajax and played for the Ajax A1 team in the annual Copa Amsterdam, scoring once.

=== Ajax ===
On 24 June 2013, Höner signed a two-year contract with Ajax. With a year remaining on his contract with Arminia Bielefeld, an undisclosed transfer fee between the two clubs was agreed. It was later revealed that the fee was €150,000 (an initial €50,000 payment, and an additional €100,000 when Höner breaks into the first team). Arminia Bielefeld was to also receive a further €100,000, should Ajax decide to sell the striker. Höner is the sixth German player to sign for Ajax. (Note: The other German players previously contracted to Ajax were Rolf Leeser (1948–1955), Werner Schaaphok (1959–1965), Horst Blankenburg (1970–1975), Arno Steffenhagen (1973–1976), and Peter Lübeke (1977).)

During the 2013–14 pre-season, Höner made his first appearance as a 63rd-minute substitute for Ajax in a 3–0 friendly match win over De Graafschap on 13 July 2013. On 5 August 2013, he made his professional debut for the reserves team Jong Ajax in a 2–0 Eerste Divisie victory over Telstar.

However, due to injuries, Höner was sidelined for a year and a half during his spell with Ajax.

=== Later career ===
Having spent a trial period with Ajax partner club Ajax Cape Town in South Africa, towards the end of the 2014–15 season. Höner was able to impress but opted to return to Germany, signing with SV Rödinghausen instead.

After leaving SV Rödinghausen Höner joined his childhood club, sixth-division VfL Theesen. Between 2021 and 2022, Höner played for Preußen Espelkamp.

== International career ==
Höner made his debut for the German national under-19 team in a 3–0 friendly match win over France on 14 November 2012. His second appearance came in a 1–0 away loss to Italy on 6 February 2013.

== Career statistics ==
Appearances and goals by club, season and competition
Club	Season	League			Total	
Club	Season	Division	Apps	Goals	Apps	Goals
Jong Ajax	2013–14	Eerste Divisie	4	0	4	0
Jong Ajax	2014–15	Eerste Divisie	3	0	3	0
Jong Ajax	Total		7	0	7	0
SV Rödinghausen	2015–16	Regionalliga West	18	3	18	3
SV Rödinghausen	2016–17	Regionalliga West	16	3	16	3
SV Rödinghausen	Total		34	6	34	6
Career total			41	6	41	6
