= Dennis Janssen =

Dutch footballer (born 1992)

Personal information
- Date of birth: 14 September 1992 (age 34)
- Place of birth: Nijmegen, Netherlands
- Height: 1.75 m (5 ft 9 in)
- Position: Defensive midfielder

Team information
- Current team: Achilles '29

Youth career
- SVO
- NEC

Senior career*
| Years | Team | Apps | (Gls) |
| 2011–2019 | TOP Oss | 205 | (10) |
| 2019–2020 | De Treffers | 12 | (1) |
| 2021–2023 | UDI '19 | 35 | (1) |
| 2023– | Achilles '29 | | |
- * Club domestic league appearances and goals

Dennis Janssen (born 14 September 1992) is a Dutch professional footballer who plays as a defensive midfielder for Achilles '29.
