= Lucas Andersen =

Danish footballer (born 1994)

Personal information
- Full name: Lucas Qvistorff Andersen
- Date of birth: 13 September 1994 (age 32)
- Place of birth: Aalborg, Denmark
- Height: 1.85 m (6 ft 1 in)
- Positions: Attacking midfielder; winger

Team information
- Current team: BG Pathum United
- Number: 10

Youth career
- Aalborg Freja
- AaB

Senior career*
Years	Team	Apps	(Gls)
2011–2012	AaB	40	(3)
2012–2016	Ajax	37	(2)
2013–2016	Jong Ajax	23	(7)
2015–2016	→ Willem II (loan)	34	(9)
2016–2019	Grasshoppers	69	(10)
2018–2019	→ AaB (loan)	23	(10)
2019–2024	AaB	97	(14)
2024–2025	Queens Park Rangers	43	(3)
2026–	BG Pathum United	0	(0)

International career^{‡}
2009–2010	Denmark U16	7	(1)
2010–2011	Denmark U17	21	(2)
2011	Denmark U18	1	(0)
2011–2012	Denmark U19	14	(0)
2012–2017	Denmark U21	29	(6)
2014–2020	Denmark	7	(0)
- * Club domestic league appearances and goals as of 6 April 2025 (UTC) ‡ National team caps and goals as of 18 November 2020

Lucas Qvistorff Andersen (born 13 September 1994) is a Danish professional footballer who plays as a winger for Thai League 1 club BG Pathum United.

== Club career ==
=== AaB ===
Andersen started playing youth football with Aalborg Freja, before moving to Aalborg BK (AaB) at the age of 10. In September 2008, Andersen went on a one-week trial at Liverpool at the age of only 14, without getting offered a contract. He penned his first professional contract with AaB in September 2009.

Andersen made his debut for AaB on 5 March 2011 at the age of 16 years and 174 days, making him the youngest player ever to play for AaB in the top-flight Danish Superliga championship and the second youngest player ever to play in the Danish Superliga. One month later, he extended his contract until 2013. He slowly became a regular part of, as he played 22 league matches for AaB in the 2011/12 season. He broke his toe in November 2011 and was out for the rest of the fall. According to a Danish source, Andersen was followed by Liverpool and Ajax in the January 2012 market. This was later confirmed by his agent.

Andersen was usually employed as a right winger, but was capable of playing on the left, as well as an attacking midfielder/playmaker behind the forwards. He was touted as the most promising player to come through the AaB youth ranks since Jesper Grønkjær, by AaB director of football Lynge Jakobsen A number of foreign clubs wanted to sign him by 2012, but Lynge Jakobsen did not want to sell Andersen at too young an age.

=== Ajax ===
On 31 August 2012, Andersen signed with Ajax for an undisclosed fee, with a view to join the squad of Jong Ajax at first. AaB's good relationship with Ajax, having sold Jesper Grønkjær to Ajax as well, was emphasized by Lynge Jakobsen as a reason for the deal materializing. Andersen made his debut 8 December, coming on as a substitute against FC Groningen.

=== Grasshopper ===
On 4 July 2016, Ajax announced that Andersen had been sold to Grasshopper Club Zürich.

=== Return to AaB ===
After a less successful 2017–18 season at Grasshoppers with limited playing time, Andersen was loaned out to his former club, AaB, for the 2018–19 season. Andersen had strong performances for the club which made AaB buy him out of his contract with Grasshoppers, making the deal permanent from 1 July 2019. Andersen signed a five-year contract. Andersen was named the new captain of AaB after long time veteran Rasmus Würtz ended his playing career.

=== Queens Park Rangers ===
On 2 February 2024 AaB confirmed that they had terminated Andersen's contract by mutual agreement. Three days later, he signed for Championship club Queens Park Rangers, reuniting with former boss Martí Cifuentes.

On 23 June 2025, Queens Park Rangers announced that Andersen would depart the club upon the expiration of his contract at the end of the month.

=== BG Panthum United ===
On 1 April 2026, Andersen joined Thai League 1 club BG Panthum United.

== International career ==
He was a part of the Denmark under-17 squad at the 2011 UEFA European Under-17 Football Championship and the 2011 FIFA U-17 World Cup.

On 8 January 2012, he was called up for the Denmark League XI national football team for their matches in the 2011 King's Cup. With his age of only 17 years and 4 months, he is the youngest player ever to have been a part of the Danish League XI squad.

== Career statistics ==
As of match played on 28 February 2018

Appearances and goals by club, season and competition
Club	Season	League			Cup		Other		Total	
Club	Season	Division	Apps	Goals	Apps	Goals	Apps	Goals	Apps	Goals
AaB	2010–11	Danish Superliga	11	0	0	0	0	0	11	0
AaB	2011–12	Danish Superliga	22	1	0	0	0	0	22	1
AaB	2012–13	Danish Superliga	7	2	0	0	0	0	7	2
AaB	Total		40	3	0	0	0	0	40	3
Ajax	2012–13	Eredivisie	1	0	2	1	0	0	3	1
Ajax	2013–14	Eredivisie	9	0	0	0	5 (Note: Two appearances in UEFA Champions League, Two appearances in UEFA Europa League, One appearance in Johan Cruyff Shield)	0	14	0
Ajax	2014–15	Eredivisie	27	2	2	1	8 (Note: Six appearances in UEFA Champions League, One appearance in UEFA Europa League, One appearance in Johan Cruyff Shield)	1	37	4
Ajax	Total		37	2	4	2	13	1	54	5
Jong Ajax	2013–14	Eerste Divisie	18	6	—				18	6
Jong Ajax	2014–15	Eerste Divisie	2	1	—				2	1
Jong Ajax	2015–16	Eerste Divisie	3	0	—				3	0
Jong Ajax	Total		23	7	—				23	7
Willem II (loan)	2015–16	Eredivisie	30	6	3	1	4 (Note: Appearances in Promotion/relegation play-offs)	3	37	10
Grasshopper	2016–17	Swiss Super League	33	6	2	0	6 (Note: Appearances in UEFA Europa League)	1	41	7
Grasshopper	2017–18	Swiss Super League	20	4	3	0	0	0	23	4
Grasshopper	Total		53	10	5	0	6	1	64	11
AaB	2018–19	Danish Superliga	23	10	4	0	0	0	27	10
AaB	2019–20	Danish Superliga	27	10	3	1	0	0	37	11
AaB	2020–21	Danish Superliga	18	1	1	0	0	0	19	1
AaB	2021-22	Danish Superliga	7	0	0	0	0	0	7	0
AaB	2022-23	Danish Superliga	31	0	6	1	0	0	37	1
AaB	2023–24	Danish 1st Division	14	2	1	0	0	0	16	2
AaB	Total		120	23	17	2	0	0	137	25
Queens Park Rangers	2023–24	EFL Championship	15	1	0	0	0	0	15	1
Career totals			318	28	12	3	23	5	370	62

== Honours ==
=== Club ===
Ajax

- Eredivisie: 2012–13, 2013–14
- Johan Cruijff Shield: 2013
