= Dejan Meleg =

Serbian association footballer

Personal information
- Full name: Dejan Meleg
- Date of birth: 1 October 1994 (age 32)
- Place of birth: Bački Jarak, FR Yugoslavia
- Height: 1.79 m (5 ft 10 in)
- Position: Attacking midfielder

Youth career
- –2012: Vojvodina

Senior career*
Years	Team	Apps	(Gls)
2012–2013	Vojvodina	7	(0)
2013–2015	Ajax	0	(0)
2013–2014	→ Jong Ajax	27	(12)
2014–2015	→ Cambuur (loan)	10	(1)
2015	→ Jong Ajax	3	(0)
2016–2017	Vojvodina	47	(13)
2017–2018	Kayserispor	0	(0)
2018–2020	Red Star Belgrade	5	(0)
2019	→ Levadiakos (loan)	8	(0)
2019	→ Radnički Niš (loan)	21	(0)
2020–2022	Borac Banja Luka	55	(11)
2022–2024	ENPPI	1	(0)
2024	Persipal Palu	8	(0)
2025	Nakhon Ratchasima	7	(0)

International career
2010–2011	Serbia U17	18	(9)
2011–2013	Serbia U19	5	(1)
2016–2017	Serbia U21	3	(0)
Medal record
Gold medal – first place	UEFA Under-19 Championship	2013
- * Club domestic league appearances and goals as of 14 December 2024

Dejan Meleg (Serbian Cyrillic: Дејан Мелег; born 1 October 1994) is a Serbian professional footballer who plays as an attacking midfielder.

== Club career ==
=== Vojvodina ===
Meleg made his professional debut with FK Vojvodina in a 0–3 loss against FK Partizan on 29 September 2012 at the age of 17. He was invited by AFC Ajax to pass medical tests in Amsterdam as a precondition to signing with the Dutch powerhouse; the transfer, however, was up in the air as of 19 December 2012 since FK Vojvodina's president Ratko Butorović had a rift with the Swiss agency which has a certain share in Meleg's professional contract.

=== Ajax ===
On 16 January 2013, Dutch media began reporting an agreement had been reached between AFC Ajax and FK Vojvodina and Meleg signing a contract until 2016. Just a week later, on 23 January 2013, it was finally announced by FK Vojvodina that Meleg signed for AFC Ajax. He made his debut for AFC Ajax on 29 June 2013 in a 2013–14 pre-season friendly encounter against SDC Putten. Meleg scored the opening goal in the 17' minute to help AFC Ajax to a 1–4 victory at the Sportpark Puttereng in Putten.

Starting the 2013/14 season, left footed Dejan Meleg was enlisted with the reserves team Jong Ajax, who were newly promoted to the Dutch Eerste Divisie the second tier of professional football in the Netherlands. He made his debut on 16 August 2013 in a 1–0 loss to MVV Maastricht. On 3 September 2013 he scored both his first and second professional goal in the Netherlands playing for Jong Ajax against Jong PSV in a 4–2 away win.

On 21 December 2015, 6 months before expiration, AFC Ajax and Meleg reached an agreement for mutual termination of contract.

==== Cambuur ====
On 10 July 2014, it was announced that Meleg would be sent on loan to SC Cambuur until the end of the season. He made his Eredivisie debut on 9 August 2014 in a 1–1 draw against FC Twente at home. He made his first appearance in the Dutch Cup on 24 September 2014 in a 4–0 away win against FC Den Bosch. On 6 March 2015 it was announced that Meleg's loan spell was terminated with immediate effect, seeing Meleg return to Amsterdam, having fallen out of favor in Leeuwarden.

=== Return to Vojvodina ===
On 2 January 2016, Dejan re-signed for FK Vojvodina until June 2018.

=== Kayserispor ===
On 28 June 2017, Meleg signed for Turkish side Kayserispor.

=== Red Star Belgrade ===
On 12 June 2018, Meleg signed for Red Star Belgrade on a 3-year deal. However, he was loaned out to Levadiakos and Radnički Niš.

=== Borac Banja Luka ===
In October 2020, he joined FK Borac Banja Luka.

=== ENPPI ===
In September 2022, he transferred to Egyptian club ENPPI SC.

=== Persipal Palu ===
In September 2024, he transferred to Indonesian club Persipal Palu.

== International career ==
Meleg has represented Serbia on various youth levels and currently plays for Serbia U19. He played for the Serbia U19 side that won the 2013 UEFA European Under-19 Championship.

== Honours ==
Serbia U19

- UEFA European Under-19 Football Championship (1): 2013

Borac Banja Luka

- Bosnian Premier League: 2020–21
