= Leon Tol =

Dutch footballer

Personal information
- Date of birth: 14 January 1987 (age 39)
- Place of birth: Volendam, Netherlands
- Height: 1.91 m (6 ft 3 in)
- Position: Centre-back

Youth career
- RKAV Volendam

Senior career*
| Years | Team | Apps | (Gls) |
| 2011–2014 | FC Volendam | 63 | (1) |
| 2014–2016 | Rijnsburgse Boys | 32 | (1) |
| 2016–202? | RKAV Volendam | | |
- * Club domestic league appearances and goals

Leon Tol (born 14 January 1987 in Volendam) is a retired Dutch former professional footballer who played as a centre-back.
