= Beloften Eredivisie =

- Founded: 1992
- Folded: 2016
- Country: Netherlands
- Confederation: UEFA
- Number of clubs: 8
- Level on pyramid: 1
- Relegation to: Beloften Eerste Divisie
- Domestic cup(s): KNVB Reserve Cup; KNVB Reserve Super Cup
- Last champions: Jong FC Utrecht
- Most championships: Jong AFC Ajax (8)

The Beloften Eredivisie (Dutch pronunciation: [bəˈlɔftə(n) ˈeːrədiˌvizi]; "Promised Honor Division") was the highest football league for reserve teams in the Netherlands organized by the Royal Dutch Football Association (KNVB). The league was founded in 1992 as Reserve Teams Eredivisie and this name was in use until the 2000–01 season. The second teams are called beloften teams.

Until the 2009–10 season the league champion, as well as the KNVB Reserve Cup winner, was awarded a ticket for the regular KNVB Cup but the reserve teams were disbanded from the KNVB Cup. A Super Cup was installed instead. There was no promotion and the team finishing at the bottom of the table was relegated to the Beloften Eerste Divisie. The competition was a stand-alone competition and was not incorporated in the Dutch professional or amateur league structure. In recent years there was less interest in the competitions. A lot of teams merged their youth programs and brought joined team into the beloften leagues. The 2012–13 season also saw a big change to the format: the best 3 teams of that season were allowed to promote to the Eerste Divisie. As a result, the reserve teams of PSV Eindhoven, Ajax and FC Twente left the Beloften Eredivisie and played in the aforementioned Eerste Divisie.

The Beloften Eredivisie was dissolved in 2016. The 11 teams that competed in the 2015–16 season were integrated into the league pyramid and assigned to three leagues below the Eredivisie based on points, as indicated in the table below.

	Team	2015–16	2012–15	Youth	Total points	Playing day
1.	Jong FC Utrecht	5.50	1.75	2.50	9.75	Saturday
2.	Jong Vitesse	5.00	2.50	2.00	9.50	Sunday
3.	Jong AZ	4.50	2.00	2.75	9.25	Sunday
4.	Jong Sparta	4.00	1.50	2.25	7.75	Saturday
5.	Jong FC Twente	3.00	2.75	1.75	7.50	Sunday
6.	Jong FC Groningen	3.50	2.25	1.5	7.25	Saturday
7.	Jong Almere City FC	2.50	0.50	1.00	4.00	Saturday
8.	Jong FC Volendam	2.00	0.75	1.25	4.00	Saturday
9.	Jong De Graafschap	1.50	1.25	0.50	3.25	Sunday
10.	Jong FC Den Bosch^{1}	1.00	1.00	0.75	2.75	Saturday
11.	Jong Achilles '29	0.50	0.25	0.25	1.00	Saturday^{2}

^{1} Formerly Brabant United. ^{2} Since the three best clubs were preferred for Saturday, Achilles was assigned to play on Sunday.

Key

Color	Qualification
	Promoted to 2016–17 Eerste Divisie
	To 2016–17 Tweede Divisie
	To 2016–17 Derde Divisie

== Champions ==
- 1992 SC Heerenveen 2
- 1993 Vitesse 2
- 1994 Ajax 2
- 1995 Sparta Rotterdam 2
- 1996 Ajax 2
- 1997 PSV 2
- 1998 Ajax 2
- 1999 De Graafschap 2
- 2000 PSV 2
- 2001 Ajax 2
- 2002 Jong Ajax
- 2003 Jong SC Heerenveen
- 2004 Jong Ajax
- 2005 Jong Ajax
- 2006 Jong AZ
- 2007 Jong SC Heerenveen
- 2008 Jong FC Twente
- 2009 Jong Ajax
- 2010 Jong PSV
- 2011 Jong PSV
- 2012 Jong FC Twente
- 2013 Jong SC Heerenveen
- 2014 Jong Feyenoord/Excelsior
- 2015 Jong Vitesse
- 2016 Jong FC Utrecht
