= Ajax Youth Academy =

Football club in Amsterdam, Netherlands

Ajax Academy
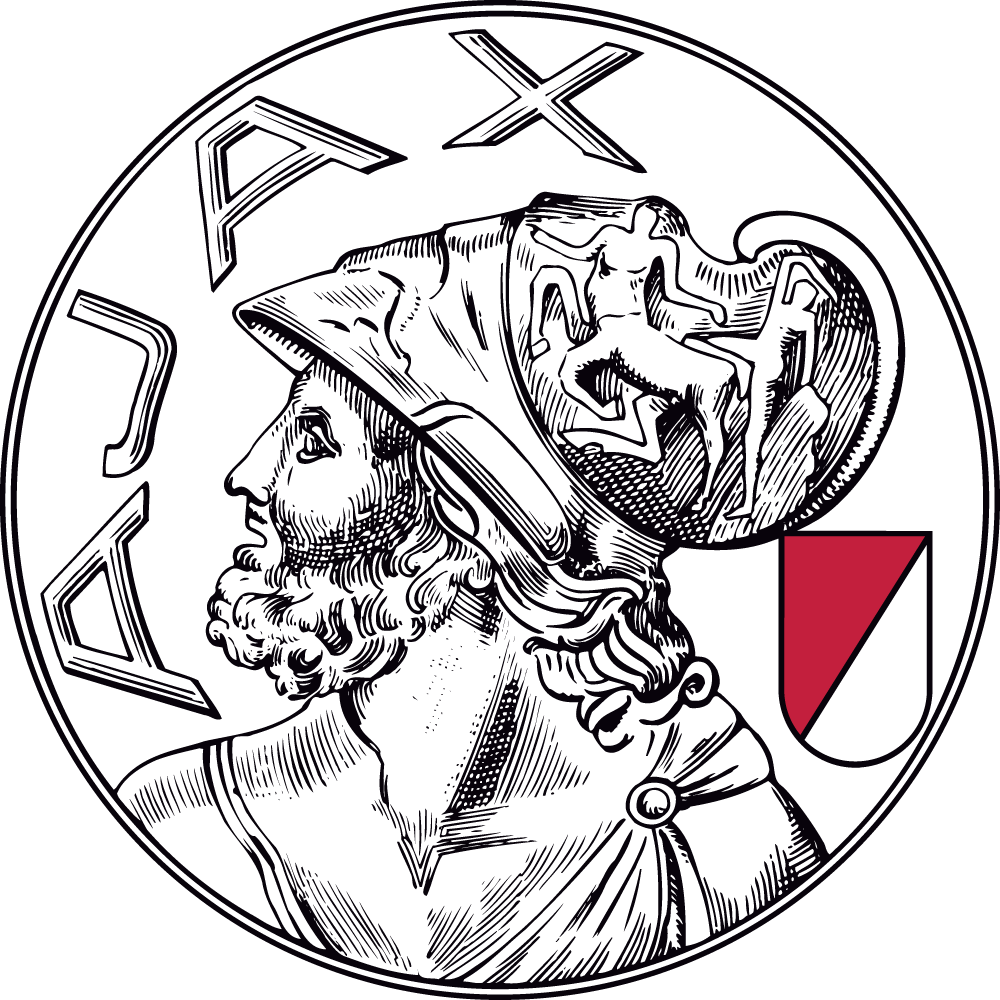
- Full name: Amsterdamsche Football Club Ajax Academy
- Nickname: De Toekomst
- Founded: 14 August 1996
- Ground: De Toekomst
- Capacity: 5,000
- Chairman: Frank Eijken
- Head coach: Saïd Ouaali
- Website: www.ajaxonlineacademy.com
Home colours	Away colours	Third colours

The Ajax Youth Academy (Dutch: Ajax Jeugdopleiding) is a football youth academy based in Amsterdam, Netherlands, from where the organisation manages a total of 13 youth teams (ages 7–18). The academy is the primary youth clinic of Dutch football team Ajax. The club depends heavily on the youth academy as they move promising youngsters from the youth teams to the senior team where they can showcase their talent and develop into stars.

On 11 September 2020, the CIES released their annual rankings of the clubs having trained the most players active in 31 top divisions of UEFA member associations. The Ajax Youth Academy came in second place to the Partizan Academy from Serbia with 77 players footballers trained, while the Serbian side topped the list with 85 footballers trained. In accordance with the UEFA definition, players who were considered have been playing for the club for at least three seasons between 15 and 21 years of age.

== History ==
The Ajax youth system is famous for having produced and still producing many great Dutch internationals like Sjaak Swart, Johan Cruijff, Frank Rijkaard, Dennis Bergkamp, Frank and Ronald de Boer, Edgar Davids, Clarence Seedorf, Patrick Kluivert, Rafael van der Vaart, Wesley Sneijder, John Heitinga, Nigel de Jong, Maarten Stekelenburg and Gregory van der Wiel.

== Notable former players ==
1900-1970s

- (Netherlands) Johan Cruijff
- (Netherlands) Gerrit Fischer
- (Netherlands) Cor Geelhuijzen
- (Netherlands) Eddy Pieters Graafland
- (Netherlands) Bobby Haarms
- (Netherlands) Barry Hulshoff
- (Netherlands) Piet Keizer
- (Netherlands) Wim Kieft
- (Netherlands) Ruud Krol
- (Netherlands) Rinus Michels
- (Netherlands) Ger van Mourik
- (Netherlands) Bennie Muller
- (Netherlands) Anton Pronk
- (Netherlands) Johnny Rep
- (Netherlands) Joop Stoffelen
- (Netherlands) Wim Suurbier
- (Netherlands) Sjaak Swart
- (Netherlands) Simon Tahamata

1980s

- (Netherlands) Marco van Basten
- (Netherlands) John Bosman
- (Netherlands) Frank de Boer
- (Netherlands) Ronald de Boer
- (Netherlands) Fred Grim
- (Netherlands) Frank Rijkaard
- (Netherlands) John van 't Schip
- (Netherlands) Aron Winter
- (Netherlands) Richard Witschge
- (Netherlands) Rob Witschge

1990s

- (Netherlands) Dennis Bergkamp
- (Netherlands) Edgar Davids
- (Netherlands) Patrick Kluivert
- (Netherlands) Edwin van der Sar
- (Netherlands) Clarence Seedorf
- (Netherlands) Mario Melchiot
- (Netherlands) Andy van der Meyde
- (Netherlands) Kiki Musampa
- (United States) John O'Brien
- (Netherlands) Michael Reiziger
- (Ghana) Abubakari Yakubu

2000s

- (Belgium) Toby Alderweireld
- (Belgium) Thomas Vermaelen
- (Belgium) Jan Vertonghen
- (Curaçao) Vurnon Anita
- (Netherlands) Ryan Babel
- (Netherlands) Daley Blind
- (Netherlands) Urby Emanuelson
- (Netherlands) John Heitinga
- (Netherlands) Nigel de Jong
- (Netherlands) Siem de Jong
- (Netherlands) Hedwiges Maduro
- (Armenia) Aras Özbiliz
- (Netherlands) Wesley Sneijder
- (Netherlands) Maarten Stekelenburg
- (Netherlands) Rafael van der Vaart
- (Netherlands) Kenneth Vermeer
- (Netherlands) Gregory van der Wiel

2010s

- (Netherlands) Donny van de Beek
- (Netherlands) Frenkie De Jong
- (Netherlands) Matthijs de Ligt
- (Netherlands) Jurriën Timber
- (Denmark) Christian Eriksen
- (Netherlands) Steven Bergwijn
- (Denmark) Nicolai Boilesen
- (United States) Sergiño Dest
- (Denmark) Viktor Fischer
- (Netherlands) Anwar El Ghazi
- (Netherlands) Ryan Gravenberch
- (Netherlands) Davy Klaassen
- (Netherlands) Justin Kluivert
- (Morocco) Noussair Mazraoui
- (Netherlands) Abdelhak Nouri
- (Netherlands) Ricardo van Rhijn
- (Netherlands) Quinten Timber
- (Netherlands) Joël Veltman

== Ajax Online Academy ==
Central is the style of play (4–3–3, with goalkeeper), training, behavior and house rules.

Ajax has developed the so-called TIPS model, which stands for Technique, Insight, Personality and Speed. For each part there are ten criteria. P and S are generally innate properties, but I and T can always be developed further. Ajax coaching sessions always consists of eight important football ingredients. Together with TIPS, they form the core to the Ajax success philosophy.

1. Coordination training 2. Kicking, Passing and Throw-in 3. Moves to beat an opponent 4. Heading 5. Finishing 6. Position play 7. Position Game play 8. Small sided games

== Teams ==
Youth teams

Level	Team	Age	League	Cup	International
A-juniors	A1	-19	Nike Eredivisie	A-juniors Cup	UEFA Youth League
B-juniors	B1	-17	B-juniors Eredivisie	B-juniors Cup	
C-juniors	C1	-15	C-juniors Eredivisie	C-juniors Cup	—
C-juniors	C2	-15	.C-juniors Eerste Divisie	C-juniors Cup	—
D-pupils	D1	-13	D-pupils Eredivisie	D-pupils Cup	—
D-pupils	D2	-13	.D-pupils Eerste Divisie	D-pupils Cup	—
E-pupils	E1	-11	E-pupils Eredivisie	E-pupils Cup	—
E-pupils	E2	-11	.E-pupils Eerste Divisie	E-pupils Cup	—
F-pupils	F1	-9	F-pupils Eredivisie	F-pupils Cup	—
F-pupils	F2	-9	.F-pupils Eerste Divisie	F-pupils Cup	—

== Board and staff ==
=== Current staff ===
Chairman

- (Netherlands) Frank Eijken

Head coach

- (Netherlands) Frank Peereboom

Assistant managers

- (Netherlands) Yuri Rose
- (Netherlands) Urby Emanuelson

Technical director (upper-level A-C)

- (Netherlands) Saïd Ouaali

Technical director (mid-level A-C)

- (Netherlands) Patrick Ladru

Technical director (lower-level D-F)

- (Netherlands) Michel Hordijk

=== List of technical directors ===
Seasons	upper-level A to C		lower-level D to F
2006–07	Maarten Stekelenburg		Patrick Ladru
2007–08	Maarten Stekelenburg		Patrick Ladru
2008–09			Patrick Ladru
2009–10			Patrick Ladru
2010–11	Edmond Claus		
	upper-level A to C	mid-level A to C	lower-level D to F
2011–12	Wim Jonk	Michel Kreek	Michel Hordijk
2012–13	Wim Jonk	Michel Kreek	Michel Hordijk
2013–14	Wim Jonk	Patrick Ladru	Michel Hordijk

== Facilities ==
=== Sportcomplex De Toekomst ===
Sportcomplex De Toekomst is the training grounds of Ajax, with a capacity of 5,000 it serves as home grounds for the reserves team Jong Ajax, its women's team Ajax Vrouwen, its amateur team Ajax Zaterdag as well as for the full youth system. The entire complex consists of seven fields and a training centre.

=== adidas miCoach Performance Centre ===
Established in 2011, the adidas MiCoach Performance Centre is situated on Sportpark De Toekomst. Built by Poly-Ned, it teaches football innovation and training methods and is used by both the first team, as well as the youth teams. Here, the players are trained in a scientific manner based on motion analytics to enhance speed, distance, dribbling, heading and shooting. On 28 October 2013 the ceiling of the main hall of the facility had collapsed, which the club in turn had to have rebuilt.

== Honours ==
=== National titles ===
- A-junioren Eredivisie : 13

1992–93, 1993–94, 1994–95, 1995–96, 1996–97, 1997–98, 2001–02, 2003–04, 2004–05, 2005–06, 2010–11, 2011–12, 2013–14

- A-junioren Eerste Divisie : 4

2004–05, 2007–08, 2008–09, 2010–11

- B-junioren Eredivisie : 4

2002–03, 2007–08, 2009–10, 2011–12

- B-junioren Eerste Divisie : 1

2006–07

- C-junioren Algeheel landskampioen : 1

2011–12

- C-junioren Eerste Divisie : 2

2008–09, 2011–12

- C 2 kampioen : 2

2009–10, 2011–12

- D-junioren Algeheel landskampioen : 1

2011–12

- D-junioren Eerste Divisie : 7

2001–02, 2002–03, 2003–04, 2006–07, 2007–08, 2010–11, 2011–12

- D 2 District West 1 kampioen : 4

2004–05, 2005–06, 2009–10, 2010–11

- D 3 kampioen : 1

2009–10

- E 1 kampioen : 1

2004–05

- E 2 kampioen : 2

2009–10, 2010–11

- E 3 kampioen : 1

2009–10

- F 1 kampioen : 2

2009–10, 2010–11

=== National cups ===
- A-junioren Cup : 1

2009–10

- B-junioren Cup : 2

2008–09, 2012–13

- D-junioren Cup : 1

2012–13

- F-pupillen District Cup : 1

2009–10

=== Dutch Super Cup ===
- A-junioren Supercup : 4

2005, 2006, 2011, 2014

- B-junioren Supercup : 2

2009, 2012

- C-junioren Supercup : 2

2012, 2014

- D-junioren Supercup : 1

2010

== See also ==
- Ajax Hellas Youth Academy (2011–2016)
