= 2014–15 Jong Ajax season =

Jong Ajax
2014–15 season
- Chairman: Hennie Henrichs
- Manager: Andries Ulderink
- Eerste Divisie: 10th
Home colours	Away colours

During the 2014–15 season Jong Ajax will participate in the Dutch Eerste Divisie, the 2nd tier of professional football in the Netherlands.

== Pre-season ==
The first training for the 2014–15 season was held on 17 June 2014. In preparation for the new season Ajax organized a training stage at Sportpark De Toekomst, Amsterdam, Netherlands. The squad from manager Jaap Stam and Andries Ulderink stayed there from 17 June 2014 to 1 July 2014. During this training stage friendly matches were played against HVV Hollandia, Wilhelmina '08, FC Den Helder, Jong PEC Zwolle, Al Shabab Al Arabi Club and Sivasspor.

== Player statistics ==
Appearances for competitive matches only

No.	Pos	Nat	Player	Total		Eerste Divisie	
No.	Pos	Nat	Player	Apps	Goals	Apps	Goals
	GK	(Netherlands) NED	Norbert Alblas	8	0	7+1	0
	GK	(Netherlands) NED	Xavier Mous	2	0	2	0
	GK	(Netherlands) NED	Indy Groothuizen	4	0	2+2	0
	DF	(Netherlands) NED	Damian van Bruggen	22	3	18+4	3
	DF	(Netherlands) NED	Damon Mirani	2	0	1+1	0
	DF	(Netherlands) NED	Tom Noordhoff	11	0	8+3	0
	DF	(Netherlands) NED	Leeroy Owusu	19	0	18+1	0
	DF	(Netherlands) NED	Terry Lartey Sanniez	6	0	3+3	0
	MF	(Netherlands) NED	Milan Vissie	3	0	1+2	0
	MF	(Netherlands) NED	Danny Bakker	26	1	23+3	1
	MF	(Netherlands) NED	Donny van de Beek	5	0	2+3	0
	MF	(Netherlands) NED	Abdel Malek El Hasnaoui	5	0	2+3	0
	MF	(Turkey) TUR	Sinan Keskin	2	0	0+2	0
	MF	(Netherlands) NED	Django Warmerdam	12	2	11+1	2
	MF	(Netherlands) NED	Fabian Sporkslede	7	2	6+1	2
	FW	(Netherlands) NED	Elton Acolatse	26	6	13+13	6
	FW	(Netherlands) NED	Daoud Bousbiba	0	0	0	0
	FW	(Netherlands) NED	Sam Hendriks	19	3	7+12	3
	FW	(Germany) GER	Marvin Höner	0	0	0	0
First team players who have made appearances for reserve squad:
	GK	(Netherlands) NED	Jasper Cillessen	1	0	1	0
	GK	(Netherlands) NED	Diederik Boer	1	0	1	0
	GK	(Netherlands) NED	Peter Leeuwenburgh	7	0	7	0
	GK	(Cameroon) CMR	André Onana	6	0	6	0
	DF	(Netherlands) NED	Ricardo van Rhijn	1	0	1	0
	DF	(Netherlands) NED	Mike van der Hoorn	6	0	6	0
	DF	(Netherlands) NED	Kenny Tete	19	2	19	2
	DF	(Netherlands) NED	Joël Veltman	3	0	3	0
	DF	(Netherlands) NED	Jaïro Riedewald	7	0	7	0
	MF	(South Africa) RSA	Thulani Serero	1	0	1	0
	MF	(Netherlands) NED	Riechedly Bazoer	14	1	14	1
	MF	(Croatia) CRO	Robert Murić	12	4	11+1	4
	MF	(Denmark) DEN	Lucas Andersen	2	1	2	1
	MF	(Denmark) DEN	Niki Zimling	2	1	2	1
	FW	(Denmark) DEN	Viktor Fischer	2	1	2	1
	FW	(Iceland) ISL	Kolbeinn Sigþórsson	1	0	1	0
	FW	(Netherlands) NED	Ricardo Kishna	3	1	3	1
	FW	(Poland) POL	Arkadiusz Milik	1	0	1	0
	FW	(Netherlands) NED	Richairo Živković	19	16	19	16
	FW	(Netherlands) NED	Queensy Menig	19	10	19	10
Youth players who have made appearances for reserve squad:
	GK	(Netherlands) NED	Stan van Bladeren	1	0	1	0
	DF	(Netherlands) NED	Mauro Savastano	2	0	1+1	0
	MF	(Netherlands) NED	Abdelhak Nouri	1	0	0+1	0
	FW	(Czech Republic) CZE	Václav Černý	1	0	0+1	0
	FW	(Netherlands) NED	Pelle Clement	0	0	0	0
	FW	(Netherlands) NED	Damil Dankerlui	2	0	0+2	0
	FW	(Greece) GRE	James Efmorfidis	0	0	0	0
Players sold or loaned out after the start of the season:
	GK	(Netherlands) NED	Kenneth Vermeer	1	0	1	0
	DF	(Netherlands) NED	Danzell Gravenberch	2	0	0+2	0
	DF	(Netherlands) NED	Stefano Denswil	6	1	6	1
	FW	(Netherlands) NED	Sheraldo Becker	16	4	13+3	4
	DF	(Netherlands) NED	Ruben Ligeon	14	0	14	0
	MF	(Netherlands) NED	Lerin Duarte	8	0	8	0
	DF	(Netherlands) NED	Robert van Koesveld	10	0	9+1	0
	MF	(Netherlands) NED	Ilan Boccara	4	0	3+1	0

As of 2 March 2015

=== Eerste Divisie standings 2013–14 ===
Current standing	Matches played	Wins	Draws	Losses	Points	Goals for	Goals against	Yellow cards (yellow card)	Red cards (red card)
10	32	12	10	10	46	62	57	33	6

==== Points by match day ====
Match day	1	2	3	4	5	6	7	8	9	10	11	12	13	14	15	16	17	18	19	20	21	22	23	24	25	26	27	28	29	30	31	32	33	34	35	36	37	38	Total
Points	3	3	0	0	0	3	0	1	3	1	1	0	3	1	1	3	3	1	3	1	0	3	3	1	1	1	0	3	0	3	0	0	-	-	-	-	-	-	46

==== Total points by match day ====
Match day	1	2	3	4	5	6	7	8	9	10	11	12	13	14	15	16	17	18	19	20	21	22	23	24	25	26	27	28	29	30	31	32	33	34	35	36	37	38	Total
Points	3	6	6	6	6	9	9	10	13	14	15	15	18	19	20	23	26	27	30	31	31	34	37	38	39	40	40	43	43	46	46	46	-	-	-	-	-	-	46

==== Standing by match day ====
Match day	1	2	3	4	5	6	7	8	9	10	11	12	13	14	15	16	17	18	19	20	21	22	23	24	25	26	27	28	29	30	31	32	33	34	35	36	37	38	Standing
Standing	3	1	5	7	12	9	12	11	9	8	10	11	9	11	10	10	9	8	7	7	9	8	8	9	9	10	11	10	10	8	9	10	-	-	-	-	-	-	10

==== Goals by match day ====
Match day	1	2	3	4	5	6	7	8	9	10	11	12	13	14	15	16	17	18	19	20	21	22	23	24	25	26	27	28	29	30	31	32	33	34	35	36	37	38	Total
Goals	3	2	0	2	0	4	0	2	5	2	1	1	4	1	1	4	3	2	3	1	0	4	2	3	4	0	1	3	0	3	0	1	-	-	-	-	-	-	62

=== 2012–13 Team records ===
Description	Competition	Result
Biggest win	(Netherlands) Friendlies	Wilhelmina '08 – Jong Ajax ( 0–9 )
Biggest win	(Netherlands) Eerste Divisie	Jong Ajax - Jong FC Twente ( 5–1 )
Biggest loss	(Netherlands) Friendlies	Jong Ajax – Al Shabab ( 1–3 )
Biggest loss	(Netherlands) Eerste Divisie	Sparta Rotterdam - Jong Ajax ( 6–0 )
Most goals in a match	(Netherlands) Friendlies	Wilhelmina '08 – Jong Ajax ( 0–9 )
Most goals in a match	(Netherlands) Eerste Divisie	Jong Ajax - Jong FC Twente ( 5–1 )

==== Topscorers ====
Friendlies

Nr.	Name	Goal
1.	(Netherlands) Sam Hendriks	11
2.	(Netherlands) Gino van Kessel	7
3.	(Netherlands) Lerin Duarte	4
3.	(Netherlands) Sheraldo Becker	4
3.	(Croatia) Robert Murić	4
6.	(Netherlands) Danny Bakker	3
6.	(Germany) Marvin Höner	3
8.	(Netherlands) Anwar El Ghazi	2
8.	(Netherlands) Damil Dankerlui	2
8.	(Denmark) Niki Zimling	2
8.	(Greece) James Efmorfidis	2
8.	(Netherlands) Django Warmerdam	2
13.	(Netherlands) Robert van Koesveld	1
13.	(Netherlands) Ilan Boccara	1
13.	(Netherlands) Elton Acolatse	1
13.	(Netherlands) Jody Lukoki	1
13.	(Netherlands) Abdel Malek El Hasnaoui	1
13.	(Montenegro) Nikola Vujnović	1
13.	(Netherlands) Leeroy Owusu	1
13.	(Netherlands) Ricardo Kishna	1
13.	(Netherlands) Ricardo van Rhijn	1
13.	(Netherlands) Stefano Denswil	1
13.	(Netherlands) Pelle Clement	1
13.	(Netherlands) Damon Mirani	1
13.	(Netherlands) Queensy Menig	1
13.	(Denmark) Viktor Fischer	1
Own goals	(United Arab Emirates) Unknown (Al Dhafra)	1
Own goals	(Netherlands) Unknown (Wooter Academy)	1
Total		47

Eerste Divisie

Nr.	Name	Goal
1.	(Netherlands) Richairo Zivkovic	18
2.	(Netherlands) Queensy Menig	9
3.	(Netherlands) Elton Acolatse	5
4.	(Netherlands) Sheraldo Becker	4
4.	(Croatia) Robert Murić	4
4.	(Netherlands) Sam Hendriks	4
7.	(Netherlands) Kenny Tete	2
7.	(Netherlands) Damian van Bruggen	2
7.	(Netherlands) Django Warmerdam	2
10.	(Denmark) Lucas Andersen	1
10.	(Netherlands) Ricardo Kishna	1
10.	(Netherlands) Danny Bakker	1
10.	(Netherlands) Stefano Denswil	1
10.	(Netherlands) Riechedly Bazoer	1
10.	(Denmark) Niki Zimling	1
10.	(Netherlands) Jaïro Riedewald	1
10.	(Netherlands) Leeroy Owusu	1
10.	(Netherlands) Milan Vissie	1
10.	(Netherlands) Fabian Sporkslede	1
10.	(Denmark) Viktor Fischer	1
Total		62

== Competitions ==
All times are in CEST

=== Eerste Divisie ===
11 August 2014	Jong Ajax	3 – 0	Telstar	Amsterdam
20:00 CET	Menig 19', 75'; Andersen 77'	Report	Tissoudali (yellow card) 30' van Huizen (yellow card) 54'	Stadium: Sportpark De Toekomst; Attendance: 1,165; Referee: Martin Perez

16 August 2014	Fortuna Sittard	0 – 2	Jong Ajax	Sittard
14:00 CET	Gulpen (yellow card) 33'; Voorn (red card); Janssen (yellow card) 68'; Watson (yellow card) 69' ter Borgh (red card)	Report	Becker 10'; Duarte (yellow card) 23'; Veltman (yellow card) 26'; Bazoer (red card); Zivkovic 55' (pen.); Bakker (yellow card) 71'	Stadium: Offermans Joosten Stadion; Attendance: 3,661; Referee: Ingmar Oostrom

22 August 2014	Jong Ajax	0 – 5	FC Volendam	Amsterdam
20:00 CET	Bakker (yellow card) 8'; Leeuwenburgh (red card); Zivkovic (red card)	Report	Mühren 36', 38'; Schilder 45'; Philips 56'; Veeman 85'	Stadium: Sportpark De Toekomst; Attendance: 400; Referee: Davy Otto

25 August 2014	Achilles '29	3 – 2	Jong Ajax	Groesbeek
20:00 CET	Maletić 17', 86'; Hendriks (yellow card) 90' (goal) 90+3' (yellow card) 90+5' (yellow-red card)	Report	Kishna 53'; Menig 66'; Denswil (yellow card) 82' (red card)	Stadium: Sportpark De Heikant; Attendance: 2,170; Referee: Allard Lindhout

29 August 2014	FC Den Bosch	2 – 0	Jong Ajax	's-Hertogenbosch
20:00 CET	van den Broek 22'; Hofstede (yellow card) 47'; Quekel 52'	Report	Boccara (yellow card) 64'	Stadium: De Vliert; Attendance: 3,028; Referee: Christiaan Bax

15 September 2014	Jong Ajax	4 – 2	Sparta Rotterdam	Amsterdam
20:00 CET	Bakker 4'; Tete (yellow card) 38'; Acolatse 57'; Boccara (yellow card) 65'; Hendriks 83'; Becker 88'	Report	Dogan 64'; Voskamp 66'	Stadium: Sportpark De Toekomst; Attendance: 928; Referee: Patrick Gerritsen

20 September 2014	Roda JC Kerkrade	1 – 0	Jong Ajax	Kerkrade
16:30 CET	Faik 50'; Lagouireh (yellow card) 80'	Report	Noordhoff (yellow card) 73'	Stadium: Parkstad Limburg Stadion; Attendance: 10,963; Referee: Siemen Mulder

26 September 2014	FC Emmen	2 – 2	Jong Ajax	Emmen
20:00 CET	Rozema (yellow card) 31'; Luis Pedro 49' (yellow card) 90+2'; Bannink 83' (pen.)	Report	Tete 33'; Murić 35'	Stadium: Univé Stadion; Attendance: 3,580; Referee: Edwin Boot

3 October 2014	Jong Ajax	5 – 1	Jong FC Twente	Amsterdam
20:00 CET	Zivkovic 15', 81' (pen.); Denswil (yellow card) 18'; Acolatse 63', 71'; Menig 75'	Report	Oosterwijk 32' van der Heyden (yellow card) 80'	Stadium: Sportpark De Toekomst; Attendance: 430; Referee: Karel van den Heuvel

17 October 2014	Helmond Sport	2 – 2	Jong Ajax	Helmond
20:00 CET	Elbers 59' (pen.); Koot (yellow card) 68'; Diouck 83' van de Sande (yellow card) 86' (yellow-red card)	Report	Becker 24'; Zivkovic 66'	Stadium: Lavans Stadion; Attendance: 2,800; Referee: Rob Dieperink

24 October 2014	Jong Ajax	1 – 1	Jong PSV	Amsterdam
20:30 CET		Report		Stadium: Sportpark De Toekomst; Attendance: 759; Referee: Erwin Blank

31 October 2014	FC Eindhoven	2 – 1	Jong Ajax	Eindhoven
20:00 CET	van der Hurk 6'; Sleegers 63'; Durwael (yellow card) 65'; Bourdouxhe (yellow card) 90+1'	Report	Zivkovic 22'	Stadium: Jan Louwers Stadion; Attendance: 2,000; Referee: Christiaan Bax

7 November 2014	FC Oss	1 – 4	Jong Ajax	Oss
20:00 CET	Stuy van den Herik (yellow card) 56'; Opoku 64'; Bakx (yellow card) 67'; Monteiro (yellow card) 72'	Report	Zivkovic 2', 14', 68'; Denswil 57'	Stadium: Frans Heesen Stadion; Attendance: 3,248; Referee: Richard Martens

24 November 2014	Jong Ajax	1 – 1	N.E.C.	Amsterdam
20:00 CET	Menig (yellow card) 65'; Bazoer 71' van Koesveld (yellow card) 74'; Zivkovic (yellow card) 82'; Becker (yellow card) 86'	Report	Santos (yellow card) 81'; Gravenbeek (yellow card) 87' van Eijden 90+4'	Stadium: Sportpark De Toekomst; Attendance: 909; Referee: Rob Dieperink

28 November 2014	Almere City	1 – 1	Jong Ajax	Almere
20:00 CET	Hoefdraad 11'	Report	Menig 35'	Stadium: Mitsubishi Forklift Stadion; Attendance: 2,500; Referee: Siemen Mulder

1 December 2014	Jong Ajax	4 – 0	VVV-Venlo	Amsterdam
20:00 CET	Zivkovic 27' (pen.), 84'; Zimling 58'; Menig 74'	Report		Stadium: Sportpark De Toekomst; Attendance: 372; Referee: Merlijn Gerritsen

8 December 2014	Jong Ajax	3 – 2	RKC Waalwijk	Amsterdam
20:00 CET	Zivkovic 42', 76'; Becker 47'; Warmerdam (yellow card) 56'	Report	Seedorf 82'; Deckers 90+5'	Stadium: Sportpark De Toekomst; Attendance: 265; Referee: Ton Koekoek

12 December 2014	MVV Maastricht	2 – 2	Jong Ajax	Maastricht
20:00 CET	Braken 42'; Knops (yellow card) 44'; Brouwers 59'	Report	van Bruggen 6'; Tete (yellow card) 32' (goal) 72'; Ligeon (yellow card) 45+2'	Stadium: De Geusselt; Attendance: 3,595; Referee: Roel Bensch

19 December 2014	Jong Ajax	3 – 1	De Graafschap	Amsterdam
20:00 CET	Hendriks 12'; Menig 37', 54'; Groothuizen (yellow card) 76'	Report	van Ewijck 77' (pen.) van de Pavert (yellow card) 60' (yellow-red card)	Stadium: Sportpark De Toekomst; Referee: Edwin Boot

16 January 2015	Telstar	1 – 1	Jong Ajax	Velsen
20:00 CET	Al Mubaraki 76'	Report	Acolatse 60'	Stadium: Telstar Stadion; Attendance: 2,763; Referee: Siemen Mulder

25 January 2015	Sparta Rotterdam	6 – 0	Jong Ajax	Rotterdam
12:30 CET	Verhaar 30'; Teijsse 36'; Gladon 44'; Dogan 45+2'; Baio 77'; Mahmudov 81'	Report		Stadium: Het Kasteel; Attendance: 5,499; Referee: Richard Martens

31 January 2015	Jong Ajax	–	FC Den Bosch	Amsterdam
16:30 CET		Report		Stadium: Sportpark De Toekomst

6 February 2015	FC Volendam	3 – 4	Jong Ajax	Volendam
20:00 CET		Report	Murić 9', 25'; Zivkovic 45+1' (pen.); Warmerdam (yellow card) 67' (goal) 87'	Stadium: Kras Stadion; Attendance: 5,011

9 February 2015	Jong Ajax	2 – 1	Achilles '29	Amsterdam
20:00 CET	Zivkovic 33', 73'; Veltman (yellow card) 49'; Zimling (yellow card) 90+2'	Report	Hendriks 8'; Edwards (yellow card) 65'; Thoone (yellow card) 79'	Stadium: De Toekomst; Attendance: 244; Referee: Stijn Berben

16 February 2015	Jong Ajax	3 – 3	Roda JC Kerkrade	Amsterdam
14:00 CET		Report		Stadium: Sportpark De Toekomst

20 February 2015	RKC Waalwijk	4 – 4	Jong Ajax	Waalwijk
20:00 CET		Report		Stadium: Mandemakers Stadion

23 February 2015	Jong Ajax	0 – 0	FC Den Bosch	Amsterdam
16:30 CET		Report		Stadium: Sportpark De Toekomst

23 February 2015	Jong Ajax	1 – 3	MVV Maastricht	Amsterdam
20:00 CET		Report		Stadium: Sportpark De Toekomst

9 March 2015	Jong Ajax	3 – 1	Almere City	Amsterdam
20:00 CET	Murić 7'; Warmerdam 17'; Lartey Sanniez (yellow card) 20'; Hendriks 76' (pen.)	Report	Keller (yellow card) 19'; Oost (yellow card) 42'; Busse (yellow card) 59'; Aslanyan-Mamedov 77'	Stadium: Sportpark De Toekomst; Attendance: 596; Referee: Christiaan Bax

13 March 2015	VVV-Venlo	1 – 0	Jong Ajax	Venlo
20:00 CET	Post (yellow card) 39'; Platje 69'	Report	van Bruggen (yellow card) 84'	Stadium: Het Koel; Attendance: 5,200; Referee: Stijn Berben

16 March 2015	Jong Ajax	3 – 0	Fortuna Sittard	Amsterdam
20:00 CET	van Bruggen 47'; Sporkslede 59'; Menig 87'	Report		Stadium: Sportpark De Toekomst; Attendance: 443; Referee: Jeroen Sanders

21 March 2015	De Graafschap	3 – 0	Jong Ajax	Doetinchem
19:45 CET	Pröpper (yellow card) 4'; Koolhof 17'; Vermeij (yellow card) 49' (goal) 89'; Linssen (yellow card) 55' van Ewijk 79' (pen.)	Report	Sporkslede (yellow card) 77'; Tete (yellow card) 90+2'	Stadium: De Vijverberg; Attendance: 7,565; Referee: Ton Koekoek

3 April 2015	Jong Ajax	1 – 2	FC Eindhoven	Amsterdam
20:00 CET	Fischer 52'	Report	van Hout 48' van den Boomen (yellow card) 55'; Boere 86'	Stadium: Sportpark De Toekomst; Attendance: 679; Referee: Edwin van de Graaf

7 April 2015	Jong PSV	–	Jong Ajax	Eindhoven
20:00 CET		Report		Stadium: Philips Stadion

13 April 2015	Jong Ajax	–	FC Emmen	Amsterdam
20:00 CET		Report		Stadium: De Toekomst

20 April 2015	Jong FC Twente	–	Jong Ajax	Enschede
14:00 CET		Report		Stadium: De Grolsch Veste

24 April 2015	Jong Ajax	–	Helmond Sport	Amsterdam
20:00 CET		Report		Stadium: De Toekomst

1 May 2015	N.E.C.	–	Jong Ajax	Nijmegen
14:00 CET		Report		Stadium: Stadion de Goffert

8 May 2015	Jong Ajax	–	FC Oss	Amsterdam
20:00 CET		Report		Stadium: Sportpark De Toekomst

=== Friendlies ===
1 July 2014	Jong Ajax (Netherlands)	2 – 0	(Netherlands) HVV Hollandia	Amsterdam, Netherlands
19:30	Warmerdam; Hendriks	Report		Stadium: Sportpark De Toekomst

10 July 2014	Wilhelmina '08 (Netherlands)	0 – 9	(Netherlands) Jong Ajax	Weert, Netherlands
18:00		Report	van Kessel 8', 34', 38', 53', 66' van Koesveld 13'; Boccara 32'; Acolatse 72'; Lukoki 90'	Stadium: Sportpark Drakesteyn

17 July 2014	FC Den Helder (Netherlands)	2 – 5	(Netherlands) Jong Ajax	Den Helder, Netherlands
19:30	Beens 15'; Robert 19'	Report	van Kessel 40', 41'; Bakker 45'; El Ghazi 80', 84'	Stadium: Streepjesberg

24 July 2014	Jong Ajax (Netherlands)	Cancelled	(Netherlands) ADO '20	Amsterdam, Netherlands
19:30		Report		Stadium: Sportpark De Toekomst

31 July 2014	Jong Ajax (Netherlands)	0 – 0	(Netherlands) Jong PEC Zwolle	Amsterdam, Netherlands
15:00		Report		Stadium: Sportpark De Toekomst

4 August 2014	Jong Ajax (Netherlands)	1 – 3	(United Arab Emirates) Al Shabab	Amsterdam, Netherlands
14:00	Duarte 67'; Bakker (penalty missed)	Report	Villanueva 22'; Rashid 42', 80'	Stadium: Sportpark De Toekomst

4 August 2014	Jong Utrecht (Netherlands)	Cancelled	(Netherlands) Jong Ajax	Utrecht, Netherlands
19:30		Report		Stadium: Stadion Galgenwaard

6 August 2014	Jong Ajax (Netherlands)	1 – 1	(Turkey) Sivasspor	Amsterdam, Netherlands
14:00	Becker	Report	Ahmet Aras	Stadium: Sportpark De Toekomst

12 August 2014	Jong Ajax (Netherlands)	2 – 1	(United Arab Emirates) Al Dhafra	Apeldoorn, Netherlands
13:40	Bakker 53'	Report	30' (o.g.); 38'	Stadium: Sportpark Kerschoten

5 September 2014	Jong Ajax (Netherlands)	0 – 2	(Netherlands) Jong Utrecht	Apeldoorn, Netherlands
13:00		Report	05'; 47'	Stadium: Sportpark Kerschoten

23 September 2014	Quick Boys (Netherlands)	0 – 4	(Netherlands) Jong Ajax	Katwijk, Netherlands
19:30		Report	El Hasnaoui 20'; Vujnović 46'; Becker 67'; Owusu 75'	Stadium: Sportpark Nieuw-Zuid

10 October 2014	Jong Ajax (Netherlands)	7 – 1	(Netherlands) Wooter Academy	Amsterdam, Netherlands
13:00	Hendriks 10', 57', 71'; Becker 27', 29'; Murić 53'	Report	22' (o.g.); 62'	Stadium: Sportpark De Toekomst

14 October 2014	Jong Ajax (Netherlands)	4 – 0	(Netherlands) Jong AZ	Amsterdam, Netherlands
13:00	Kishna 41' van Rhijn; Denswil 87'; Duarte 90'	Report		Stadium: Sportpark De Toekomst

28 October 2014	TEC (Netherlands)	1 – 6	(Netherlands) Jong Ajax	Tiel, Netherlands
19:30	van Gessel 60'	Report	Hendriks 12', 65', 79', 86'; Murić 43', 89'	Stadium: Sportpark De Lok

14 November 2014	Jong Ajax (Netherlands)	0 – 1	(Netherlands) Heracles Almelo	Amsterdam, Netherlands
13:30		Report	Navrátil 47'	Stadium: Sportpark De Toekomst

18 November 2014	Jong Ajax (Netherlands)	2 – 3	(Netherlands) Sparta Rotterdam	Amsterdam, Netherlands
14:30	Duarte; Zimling	Report		Stadium: Sportpark De Toekomst

2 December 2014	De Zouaven (Netherlands)	0 – 4	(Netherlands) Jong Ajax	Grootebroek, Netherlands
14:00	Duarte; Zimling	Report	Bakker; Hendriks; Dankerlui	Stadium: Sportpark De Kloet

10 January 2015	RKAV Volendam (Netherlands)	2 – 3	(Netherlands) Jong Ajax	Volendam, Netherlands
14:00		Report	Duarte; Hendriks; Dankerlui	Stadium: Sportpark De Kloet

20 January 2015	Jong Ajax (Netherlands)	5 – 1	(Netherlands) Hollandia	Amsterdam, Netherlands
14:00	Zimling; Höner; Efmoridis; Clement	Report		Stadium: adidas MiCoach Performance Centre

31 January 2015	Jong Ajax (Netherlands)	4 – 2	(Netherlands) SDC Putten	Amsterdam, Netherlands
12:00	Warmerdam 5'; Menig 10'; Mirani 52'; Murić 68'	Report	8'; 45'	Stadium: Sportpark De Toekomst

27 March 2015	Borussia Dortmund U23s (Germany)	4 – 3	(Netherlands) Jong Ajax	Dortmund, Germany
12:00		Report	Fischer 12'; Höner 61', 89'

13 May 2015	Jong Ajax (Netherlands)	1 – 2	(Suriname) Suriprofs	Amsterdam, Netherlands
19:00	Hendriks	Report	Kishna; Riedewald	Stadium: Sportpark De Toekomst; Attendance: 3,000
