= 2015–16 AFC Ajax season =

Dutch football club season

Ajax
2015–16 season
- Chairman: Hennie Henrichs
- Manager: Frank de Boer
- Eredivisie: 2nd
- KNVB Cup: Third round
- UEFA Champions League: Third qualifying round
- UEFA Europa League: Group stage
- Top goalscorer: League: Arkadiusz Milik (21); All: Arkadiusz Milik (24)
- Highest home attendance: 51,862 vs PEC Zwolle (3 April 2016)
- Lowest home attendance: 3,750 at Excelsior (20 September 2015)
Home colours	Away colours

The 2015–16 AFC Ajax season saw the club participate in the Eredivisie, the KNVB Cup, the UEFA Champions League and the UEFA Europa League. The first training took place on 6 July 2015 while the traditional AFC Ajax Open Day was held on 20 July.

== Pre-season ==
The first training for the 2015–16 season was held on 6 June 2015. In preparation for the new season, Ajax organized a training stage in Neustift, Austria. The squad, with manager Frank de Boer, remained there from 15 to 24 June. During this training stage, a friendly match was played against Dynamo Moscow, whereupon the club then traveled back to the Netherlands, residing at De Lutte for additional training. The squad stayed there from 30 June to 5 July, when further friendly matches were played against Nordsjælland, Panathinaikos and VfL Wolfsburg. Traveling to France, a further friendly match was played against Saint-Étienne.

== Player statistics ==
Appearances for competitive matches only

No.	Pos	Nat	Player	Total		Eredivisie		UEFA Champions League UEFA Europa League		KNVB Cup 2015 Johan Cruyff Shield	
No.	Pos	Nat	Player	Apps	Goals	Apps	Goals	Apps	Goals	Apps	Goals
1	GK	(Netherlands) NED	Jasper Cillessen	39	0	31	0	8	0	0	0
2	DF	(Netherlands) NED	Ricardo van Rhijn	14	0	12	0	2	0	0	0
3	DF	(Netherlands) NED	Joël Veltman	37	2	32	2	5	0	0	0
4	DF	(Netherlands) NED	Mike van der Hoorn	14	0	13	0	1	0	0	0
6	DF	(Netherlands) NED	Riechedly Bazoer	32	5	28	5	4	0	0	0
7	FW	(Denmark) DEN	Viktor Fischer	34	9	26	7	8	2	0	0
8	MF	(Netherlands) NED	Daley Sinkgraven	20	0	16	0	4	0	0	0
9	FW	(Poland) POL	Arkadiusz Milik	36	22	29	21	7	1	0	0
10	MF	(Netherlands) NED	Davy Klaassen	37	15	29	13	8	2	0	0
11	MF	(Germany) GER	Amin Younes	31	6	25	6	6	0	0	0
17	DF	(Denmark) DEN	Nicolai Boilesen	0	0	0	0	0	0	0	0
19	FW	(Netherlands) NED	Richairo Zivkovic	0	0	0	0	0	0	0	0
20	FW	(Denmark) DEN	Lasse Schöne	30	5	24	4	6	1	0	0
21	FW	(Netherlands) NED	Anwar El Ghazi	33	11	26	11	7	0	0	0
22	DF	(Netherlands) NED	Jaïro Riedewald	29	0	21	0	8	0	0	0
23	DF	(Netherlands) NED	Kenny Tete	27	0	20	0	7	0	0	0
24	GK	(Cameroon) CMR	André Onana	0	0	0	0	0	0	0	0
25	MF	(South Africa) RSA	Thulani Serero	15	1	12	1	3	0	0	0
26	DF	(Netherlands) NED	Nick Viergever	16	0	15	0	1	0	0	0
27	MF	(Serbia) SRB	Nemanja Gudelj	40	5	32	4	8	1	0	0
29	FW	(Netherlands) NED	Sam Hendriks	1	0	1	0	0	0	0	0
30	MF	(Netherlands) NED	Donny van de Beek	10	1	8	0	2	1	0	0
31	FW	(Croatia) CRO	Robert Murić	2	0	2	0	0	0	0	0
32	MF	(Czech Republic) CZE	Václav Černý	5	0	5	0	0	0	0	0
33	GK	(Netherlands) NED	Diederik Boer	1	0	1	0	0	0	0	0
34	MF	(Netherlands) NED	Abdelhak Nouri	0	0	0	0	0	0	0	0
35	MF	(Netherlands) NED	Mitchell Dijks	35	0	28	0	7	0	0	0
36	MF	(Netherlands) NED	Mauro Savastano	0	0	0	0	0	0	0	0
37	FW	(Denmark) DEN	Kasper Dolberg	0	0	0	0	0	0	0	0
38	GK	(Netherlands) NED	Norbert Alblas	0	0	0	0	0	0	0	0
39	DF	(Netherlands) NED	Leeroy Owusu	0	0	0	0	0	0	0	0
40	DF	(Netherlands) NED	Damian van Bruggen	0	0	0	0	0	0	0	0

As of 7 March 2016

=== 2015–16 selection by nationality ===
Nationality	(Netherlands)	(Denmark)	(Serbia)	(Cameroon)	(France)	(Germany)	(Poland)	(South Africa)	(Belgium)	(Croatia)	(Czech Republic)	Total Players
Current squad selection	14	3	1	1	1	1	1	1	-	-	-	24
Youth/reserves squad in AFC Ajax selection	25	1	2	-	-	-	-	-	2	1	1	32
Players out on loan	7	1	-	-	-	-	-	-	-	-	-	8

== Team statistics ==
=== Eredivisie standings 2015–16 ===
Current standing	Matches played	Wins	Draws	Losses	Points	Goals for	Goals against	Yellow cards (yellow card)	Red cards (red card)
2nd	34	25	7	2	82	81	21	3	0

==== Points by match day ====
Match day	1	2	3	4	5	6	7	8	9	10	11	12	13	14	15	16	17	18	19	20	21	22	23	24	25	26	27	28	29	30	31	32	33	34	Total
Points	3	3	3	3	1	3	3	0	3	3	3	1	3	3	3	0	3	3	3	1	1	3	3	3	3	3	1	3	3	3	1	3	3	1	82

==== Total points by match day ====
Match day	1	2	3	4	5	6	7	8	9	10	11	12	13	14	15	16	17	18	19	20	21	22	23	24	25	26	27	28	29	30	31	32	33	34	Total
Points	3	6	9	12	13	16	19	19	22	25	28	29	32	35	38	38	41	44	47	48	49	52	55	58	61	64	65	68	71	74	75	78	81	82	82

==== Standing by match day ====
Match day	1	2	3	4	5	6	7	8	9	10	11	12	13	14	15	16	17	18	19	20	21	22	23	24	25	26	27	28	29	30	31	32	33	34	Standing
Standing	1	1	1	1	1	1	1	1	1	1	1	1	1	1	1	1	1	1	1	1	2	2	2	2	2	2	2	1	1	1	-	-	-	2	2

==== Goals by match day ====
Match day	1	2	3	4	5	6	7	8	9	10	11	12	13	14	15	16	17	18	19	20	21	22	23	24	25	26	27	28	29	30	31	32	33	34	Total
Goals	3	3	2	4	2	2	2	1	2	3	6	1	5	2	5	0	2	1	1	0	2	2	2	3	4	4	2	2	3	1	2	2	4	1	81

=== Statistics for the 2015–16 season ===
- This is an overview of all the statistics for played matches in the 2014–15 season.

	Friendlies	Johan Cruyff Shield	KNVB Cup	UEFA Champions League	UEFA Europa League	Eredivisie	Total
Matches	6 of 6	0 of 0	0 of 1	0 of 2	0 of 0	34 of 34	40 of 43
Win	2 of 6	0 of 0	0 of 1	0 of 2	0 of 0	25 of 34	27 of 43
Draw	2 of 6	0 of 0	0 of 1	0 of 2	0 of 0	7 of 34	9 of 43
Loss	2 of 6	0 of 0	0 of 1	0 of 2	0 of 0	2 of 34	4 of 43
Home	2 of 2	0 of 0	0 of 0	0 of 1	0 of 0	0 of 17	2 of 20
Away	4 of 4	0 of 0	0 of 1	0 of 1	0 of 0	0 of 17	4 of 23
Yellow cards (yellow card)	0	0	0	0	0	0	0
Red cards (red card)	0	0	0	0	0	0	0
2 x yellow in 1 match (yellow card) (yellow-red card)	0	0	0	0	0	0	0
Number of substitutes used (substituted on) (substituted off)	43	0	0	0	0	0	43
Goals for	12	0	0	0	0	62	74
Goals against	8	0	0	0	0	21	29
Balance	+4	0	0	0	0	+22	+26
Clean sheets	1	0	0	0	0	0	1
Penalties for	0	0	0	0	0	0	0
Penalties against	0	0	0	0	0	0	0

=== 2015–16 team records ===
Description	Competition	Result
Biggest win	(Netherlands) Friendly match	Ajax – Umm Salal ( 6–1 )
Biggest win	(Netherlands) KNVB Cup	—
Biggest win	(Europe) UEFA Champions League	—
Biggest win	(Europe) UEFA Europa League	—
Biggest win	(Netherlands) Eredivisie	AZ – Ajax ( 0–3 )
Biggest loss	(Netherlands) Friendly match	Ajax – Nordsjælland ( 1–3 )
Biggest loss	(Netherlands) KNVB Cup	—
Biggest loss	(Europe) UEFA Champions League	Ajax – Rapid Wien ( 2–3 )
Biggest loss	(Europe) UEFA Europa League	—
Biggest loss	(Netherlands) Eredivisie	—
Most goals in a match	(Netherlands) Friendly match	Ajax – Umm Salal ( 6–1 )
Most goals in a match	(Netherlands) KNVB Cup	—
Most goals in a match	(Europe) UEFA Champions League	Ajax – Rapid Wien ( 2–3 )
Most goals in a match	(Europe) UEFA Europa League	—
Most goals in a match	(Netherlands) Eredivisie	AZ – Ajax ( 0–3 )

==== Topscorers ====
Friendlies

Nr.	Name	Goal
1.	(France) Yaya Sanogo	3
2.	(Denmark) Lasse Schöne	2
3.	(Netherlands) Riechedly Bazoer	1
3.	(Netherlands) Danny Bakker	1
3.	(Poland) Arkadiusz Milik	1
3.	(Netherlands) Anwar El Ghazi	1
3.	(Netherlands) Davy Klaassen	1
3.	(Denmark) Lucas Andersen	1
Own goal	(Russia) Maksim Kuzmin (Dynamo Moscow)	1
Total		12

Eredivisie

Nr.	Name	Goal
1.	(Poland) Arkadiusz Milik	21
2.	(Netherlands) Davy Klaassen	12
3.	(Netherlands) Anwar El Ghazi	11
4.	(Denmark) Viktor Fischer	7
5.	(Germany) Amin Younes	6
6.	(Netherlands) Riechedly Bazoer	5
7.	(Serbia) Nemanja Gudelj	4
8.	(Denmark) Lasse Schöne	4
9.	(Netherlands) Joël Veltman	2
10.	(South Africa) Thulani Serero	1
Total		64

KNVB Cup

Nr.	Name	Goal
1.	(Denmark) Viktor Fischer	1
1.	(Netherlands) John Heitinga	1
Total		2

UEFA Champions League

Nr.	Name	Goal
1.	(Netherlands) Davy Klaassen	2
2.	(Poland) Arkadiusz Milik	1
2.	(Serbia) Nemanja Gudelj	1
Total		4

UEFA Europa League

Nr.	Name	Goal
1.	—	-
Total		—

== Placements ==
	Friendlies	KNVB Cup	UEFA Champions League	UEFA Europa League	Eredivisie
Status	6 played, 2 wins, 2 draws, 2 losses	4th Round; Next opponent: De Graafschap	Third qualifying round Last opponent: SK Rapid Wien; Placement for: UEFA Europa League Playoffs	Playoff Round; Next opponent: FK Jablonec	—

== Competitions ==
All times are in CEST

=== Eredivisie ===
==== League table ====
Pos	Team	Pld	W	D	L	GF	GA	GD	Pts	Qualification or relegation
1	PSV Eindhoven (C)	34	26	6	2	88	32	+56	84	Qualification for the Champions League group stage
2	Ajax	34	25	7	2	81	21	+60	82	Qualification for the Champions League third qualifying round
3	Feyenoord	34	19	6	9	62	40	+22	63	Qualification for the Europa League group stage (Note: Feyenoord qualified for the Europa League group stage by winning the 2015–16 KNVB Cup.)
4	AZ	34	18	5	11	70	53	+17	59	Qualification for the Europa League third qualifying round
5	Utrecht	34	15	8	11	57	48	+9	53	Qualification for the European competition play-offs (Note: Four teams played for one spot in the UEFA Europa League third qualifying round.)

Source: Eredivisie, NUsport, Soccerway
Rules for classification: 1) Points; 2) Goal difference; 3) Goals scored; 4) Head-to-head points; 5) Head-to-head goal difference; 6) Head-to-head away goals scored; 7) Play-off (only if deciding champion, European competitions, or relegation); 8) Draw.
(C) Champions

==== Matches ====
9 August 2015 1	AZ	0–3	Ajax	Alkmaar
12:30 CEST	Van Overeem (yellow card) 66'	Report	El Ghazi 14', 38', (yellow card) 33'; Gudelj 40'; Klaassen (yellow card) 69'; Riedewald (yellow card) 90'	Stadium: AFAS Stadion; Attendance: 16,637; Referee: Bas Kuipers

15 August 2015 2	Ajax	3–0	Willem II	Amsterdam
19:45 CEST	Milik 18'; El Ghazi 67', 90+1'	Report		Stadium: Amsterdam Arena; Attendance: 48,494; Referee: Bas Nijhuis

23 August 2015 3	NEC	0–2	Ajax	Nijmegen
	Kane (yellow card) 37'	Report	Milik 48'; Sinkgraven (yellow card) 79'; Van Eijden 86' (o.g.)	Stadium: Goffertstadion; Attendance: 12,321; Referee: Dennis Higler

30 August 2015 4	Ajax	4–0	ADO Den Haag	Amsterdam
Report	El Ghazi 16', 74'; Klaassen 20'; Veltman 58'		Alberg (yellow card) 34'; Beugelsdijk (yellow card) 83'	Stadium: Amsterdam Arena; Attendance: 43,578; Referee: Danny Makkelie

12 September 2015 5	Twente	2–2	Ajax	Enschede
	Ede (yellow card) 16'; Gutiérrez 20'; Ziyech 51' (pen.); Makotjo (yellow card) 62'; Olaitan (yellow card) 71'; Drommel (yellow card) 81'	Report	Viergever (yellow card) 17'; Gudelj (yellow card) 51', (goal) 82' (pen.); El Ghazi (yellow card) 59'; Fischer 65'	Stadium: De Grolsch Veste; Attendance: 29,000; Referee: Pol van Boekel

20 September 2015 6	Excelsior	0–2	Ajax	Rotterdam
	Mattheij (yellow card) 54'; Hasselbaink (yellow card) 60'	Report	El Ghazi 33'; Milik 42'; Riedewald (yellow card) 58'	Stadium: Stadion Woudestein; Attendance: 3,750; Referee: Kevin Blom

26 September 2015 7	Ajax	2–0	Groningen	Amsterdam
	Gudelj 23'; Fischer 80'	Report	Bacuna (yellow card) 85'	Stadium: Amsterdam Arena; Attendance: 45,676; Referee: Richard Liesveld

4 October 2015 8	Ajax	1–2	PSV	Amsterdam
	Younes 10'; Tete (yellow card) 51'; Veltman (yellow card) 65'; Dijks (yellow card) 88'	Report	Pereiro 7', 79', (yellow card) 90'; Bruma (yellow card) 17'; Guardado (yellow card) 29'; Locadia (yellow card) 55'	Stadium: Amsterdam Arena; Attendance: 51,154; Referee: Bas Nijhuis

17 October 2015 9	Heracles	0–2	Ajax	Almelo
	Pelupessy (yellow card) 58'; Te Wierik (yellow card) 62'; Bruns (yellow card) 69'	Report	El Ghazi 14'; Gudelj 22', (yellow card) 74'; Dijks (yellow card) 79'	Stadium: Polman Stadion; Attendance: 12,080; Referee: Kevin Blom

25 October 2015 10	Vitesse	1–3	Ajax	Arnhem
	Nakamba (yellow card) 46'; Qazaishvili 54'; Van der Werff (yellow card) 61'; Leerdam (yellow card) 70'; Ibarra (yellow card) 90+2'	Report	Gudelj (yellow card) 1'; Dijks (yellow card) 39'; Fischer 71'; Bazoer 73'; Schöne 86'	Stadium: GelreDome; Attendance: 21,163; Referee: Richard Liesveld

31 October 2015 11	Ajax	6–0	Roda JC

8 November 2015 12	Feyenoord	1–1	Ajax

21 November 2015 13	Ajax	5–1	Cambuur

29 November 2015 14	PEC Zwolle	0–2	Ajax

5 December 2015 15	Ajax	5–2	Heerenveen

13 December 2015 16	Utrecht	1–0	Ajax

20 December 2015 17	Ajax	2–1	De Graafschap

17 January 2016 18	ADO Den Haag	0–1	Ajax

23 January 2016 19	Ajax	1–0	Vitesse

26 January 2016 20	Ajax	0–0	Heracles

31 January 2016 21	Roda JC	2–2	Ajax

7 February 2016 22	Ajax	2–1	Feyenoord

14 February 2016 23	Groningen	1–2	Ajax

21 February 2016 24	Ajax	3–0	Excelsior

28 February 2016 25	Ajax	4–1	AZ

6 March 2016 26	Willem II	0–4	Ajax

13 March 2016 27	Ajax	2–2	NEC

20 March 2016 28	PSV	0–2	Ajax

3 April 2016 29	Ajax	3–0	PEC Zwolle

9 April 2016 30	Cambuur	0–1	Ajax

17 April 2016 31	Ajax	2–2	Utrecht

20 April 2016 32	Heerenveen	0–2	Ajax

1 May 2016 33	Ajax	4–0	Twente

8 May 2016 34	De Graafschap	1–1	Ajax

=== KNVB Cup ===
23 September 2015 Round 2	Ajax	2–0	De Graafschap	Amsterdam
20:45	Fischer 41'; Heitinga 85'			Stadium: Amsterdam Arena; Attendance: 24,738; Referee: Jochem Kamphuis

28 October 2015 Round 3	Feyenoord	1–0	Ajax	Rotterdam
19:45	Veltman 90+5' (o.g.)			Stadium: De Kuip; Attendance: 47,500; Referee: Pol van Boekel

=== UEFA Champions League ===
==== Third qualifying round ====
29 July 2015 First leg	Rapid Wien (Austria)	2–2	(Netherlands) Ajax	Vienna, Austria
21:05	Petsos (yellow card) 42'; Kainz 48'; Schwab (red card) 59'; Berić 76'	Report	Klaassen 25', 43', (yellow card) 71'; Veltman (yellow card) 76'	Stadium: Ernst-Happel-Stadion; Attendance: 43,200; Referee: William Collum (Scotland)

4 August 2015 Second leg	Ajax (Netherlands)	2–3 (4–5 a agg.)	(Austria) Rapid Wien	Amsterdam, Netherlands
20:15	Milik 52'; Gudelj 75'	Report	Berič 12'; Schaub 39', 77'	Stadium: Amsterdam Arena; Attendance: Ivan Kružliak (Slovakia)

=== UEFA Europa League ===
==== Qualifying rounds ====
===== Play-off round =====
20 August 2015 First leg	Ajax (Netherlands)	1–0	(Czech Republic) FK Jablonec	Amsterdam, Netherlands
19:00 CET	Milik 54' (pen.)	Report		Stadium: Amsterdam Arena; Attendance: 30,898; Referee: Tony Chapron (France)

27 August 2015 Second leg	FK Jablonec (Czech Republic)	0–0 (1–0 agg.)	(Netherlands) Ajax	Jablonec nad Nisou, Czech Republic
18:00 CET		Report		Stadium: Chance Arena; Attendance: 6,040; Referee: Kenn Hansen (Denmark)

==== Group stage ====
Pos	Team	Pld	W	D	L	GF	GA	GD	Pts	Qualification	MOL	FEN	AJX	CEL
1	(Norway) Molde	6	3	2	1	10	7	+3	11	Advance to knockout phase	—	0–2	1–1	3–1
2	(Turkey) Fenerbahçe	6	2	3	1	7	6	+1	9	Advance to knockout phase	1–3	—	1–0	1–1
3	(Netherlands) Ajax	6	1	4	1	6	6	0	7		1–1	0–0	—	2–2
4	(Scotland) Celtic	6	0	3	3	8	12	−4	3		1–2	2–2	1–2	—

Source: Soccerway
Rules for classification: Group stage tiebreakers

==== Matches ====
17 September 2015 1	Ajax (Netherlands)	2–2	(Scotland) Celtic	Amsterdam, Netherlands
19:00 CET	Fischer 25'; Schøne 84'	Report	Bitton 8'; Lustig 42'	Stadium: Amsterdam Arena; Attendance: 47,455; Referee: Luca Banti (Italy)

1 October 2015 2	Molde (Norway)	1–1	(Netherlands) Ajax	Molde, Norway
21:00 CET	Hestad 8'	Report	Fischer 19'	Stadium: Molde Stadion; Attendance: 7,890; Referee: Paweł Raczkowski (Poland)

== Friendlies ==
4 July 2015	Ajax (Netherlands)	2–2	(Russia) Dynamo Moscow	Kematen, Austria
20:00	Kuzmin 19' (o.g.); Bazoer 59'	Report	Kuzmin 30'; M'Vila 83'	Stadium: Sportplatz Kematen

10 July 2015	Ajax (Netherlands)	1–3	(Denmark) Nordsjælland	Hardenberg, Netherlands
16:30	Bakker 81'	Report	Ingvartsen 8'; Moberg Karlsson 17', 66'	Stadium: De Boshoek

10 July 2015	Ajax (Netherlands)	2–0	(Greece) Panathinaikos	Epe, Netherlands
20:00	Milik 33'; El Ghazi 87'	Report		Stadium: De Wachtelenberg

17 July 2015	Ajax (Netherlands)	1–1	(Germany) VfL Wolfsburg	Amsterdam, Netherlands
19:00		Report		Stadium: Amsterdam Arena

22 July 2015	Saint-Étienne (France)	1–0	(Netherlands) Ajax	Valenciennes, France
19:00	Bamba 85'	Report		Stadium: Stade du Hainaut

10 August 2015	Ajax (Netherlands)	6–1	(Qatar) Umm Salal	Amsterdam, Netherlands
19:00	Schöne 2', 13'; Sanogo 6', 17', 35'; Andersen 30'	Report	Sagbo 53'	Stadium: Sportpark De Toekomst

8 October 2015	Ajax (Netherlands)	1–2	(England) Southampton	Amsterdam, Netherlands
19:30	Schöne 60' (pen.)	Report	Seager 19'; Juanmi 60'	Stadium: Sportpark De Toekomst

== Transfers for 2015–16 ==
=== Summer transfer window ===
For a list of all Dutch football transfers in the summer window (1 July 2015 to 31 August 2015) please see List of Dutch football transfers summer 2015.

==== Arrivals ====
- The following players moved to AFC Ajax.

	Name	Position	Transfer type	Previous club	Fee
	Return from loan spell				
Substituted on	(Netherlands) Sheraldo Becker	Forward	30 June 2015	(Netherlands) PEC Zwolle	-
Substituted on	(Netherlands) Lerin Duarte	Midfielder	30 June 2015	(Netherlands) Heerenveen	-
Substituted on	(Netherlands) Mickey van der Hart	Goalkeeper	30 June 2015	(Netherlands) Go Ahead Eagles	-
Substituted on	(Netherlands) Bas Kuipers	Defender	30 June 2015	(Netherlands) Excelsior	-
Substituted on	(Netherlands) Ruben Ligeon	Defender	30 June 2015	(Netherlands) NAC Breda	-
Substituted on	(Netherlands) Lesly de Sa	Forward	30 June 2015	(Netherlands) Go Ahead Eagles	-
	Loan				
Substituted on	(France) Yaya Sanogo	Forward	17 July 2015	(England) Arsenal	-
	Transfer				
Substituted on	(Poland) Arkadiusz Milik	Forward	1 April 2015	(Germany) Bayer Leverkusen	€2,800,000
Substituted on	(Belgium) Francesco Antonucci	Midfielder	5 May 2015	(Belgium) Anderlecht	€500,000
Substituted on	(Serbia) Nemanja Gudelj	Midfielder	6 May 2015	(Netherlands) AZ	€6,000,000
Substituted on	(Serbia) Dragiša Gudelj	Defender	9 May 2015	(Netherlands) NAC Breda	€150,000
Substituted on	(Netherlands) Mitchell Dijks	Defender	19 June 2015	(Netherlands) Willem II	€1,000,000
Substituted on	(Denmark) Kasper Dolberg	Forward	30 June 2015	(Denmark) Silkeborg	€270,000
Substituted on	(Germany) Amin Younes	Midfielder	15 July 2015	(Germany) Borussia Mönchengladbach	€1,500,000
	Free Transfer				
Substituted on	(Netherlands) John Heitinga	Defender	25 June 2015	(Germany) Hertha BSC	-
Substituted on	(Netherlands) Keshone Mettendaf	Midfielder	30 June 2015	(Netherlands) Almere City	-
Substituted on	(Netherlands) Frenkie de Jong	Midfielder	24 August 2015	(Netherlands) Willem II	-

==== Departures ====
- The following players moved from AFC Ajax.

	Name	Position	Transfer type	New club	Fee
	Out on loan				
Substituted off	(Netherlands) Xavier Mous	Goalkeeper	30 June 2015	(Netherlands) Oss	-
Substituted off	(Netherlands) Peter Leeuwenburgh	Goalkeeper	30 June 2015	(Netherlands) Dordrecht	-
Substituted off	(Netherlands) Sheraldo Becker	Forward	30 June 2015	(Netherlands) PEC Zwolle	-
Substituted off	(Netherlands) Ruben Ligeon	Defender	30 June 2015	(Netherlands) Willem II	-
Substituted off	(Netherlands) Lesly de Sa	Forward	30 June 2015	(Netherlands) Willem II	-
Substituted off	(Netherlands) Richairo Zivkovic	Forward	30 June 2015	(Netherlands) Willem II	-
Substituted off	(Netherlands) Queensy Menig	Forward	27 July 2015	(Netherlands) PEC Zwolle	-
Substituted off	(Denmark) Lucas Andersen	Midfielder	24 August 2015	(Netherlands) Willem II	-
	Loan return				
Substituted off	(Denmark) Niki Zimling	Midfielder	30 June 2015	(Germany) Mainz 05	-
	Transfer				
Substituted off	(Iceland) Kolbeinn Sigþórsson	Forward	1 July 2015	(France) Nantes	€3,500,000
Substituted off	(Netherlands) Ricardo Kishna	Forward	27 July 2015	(Italy) Lazio	€4,000,000
	Free Transfer				
Substituted off	(Netherlands) Tom Noordhoff	Defender	29 April 2015	(Netherlands) Telstar	-
Substituted off	(Germany) Marvin Höner	Forward	20 May 2015	(Germany) SV Rödinghausen	-
Substituted off	(Turkey) Sinan Keskin	Forward	20 May 2015	(Netherlands) Utrecht	-
Substituted off	(Netherlands) Joost Meendering	Goalkeeper	28 May 2015	(Netherlands) HVV Hollandia	-
Substituted off	(Netherlands) Melvin Vissers	Midfielder	29 May 2015	(Netherlands) Sparta Rotterdam	-
Substituted off	(Netherlands) Bas Kuipers	Defender	20 June 2015	(Netherlands) Excelsior	-
Substituted off	(Netherlands) Mike Grim	Goalkeeper	23 June 2015	(Netherlands) Almere City	-
Substituted off	(Finland) Niklas Moisander	Defender	30 June 2015	(Italy) Sampdoria	-
Substituted off	(Greece) James Efmorfidis	Midfielder	30 June 2015	(Netherlands) AZ	-
Substituted off	(Netherlands) Shaquill Sno	Defender	30 June 2015	–	-
Substituted off	(Turkey) Samet Bulut	Forward	30 June 2015	(Netherlands) PEC Zwolle	-
Substituted off	(Netherlands) Fabian Sporkslede	Midfielder	16 July 2015	(Italy) Chievo	-
Substituted off	(Netherlands) Donyell Malen	Forward	24 July 2015	(England) Arsenal	-
Substituted off	(Netherlands) Abdel Malek El Hasnaoui	Midfielder	11 August 2015	(Netherlands) PEC Zwolle	-
Substituted off	(Netherlands) Mickey van der Hart	Goalkeeper	14 August 2015	(Netherlands) PEC Zwolle	-

=== Winter transfer window ===
For a list of all Dutch football transfers in the winter window (1 January 2016 to 1 February 2016) please see List of Dutch football transfers winter 2015–16.

==== Arrivals ====
- The following players moved to AFC Ajax.

	Name	Position	Transfer type	New club	Fee
	Return from loan spell				
Substituted on	(Netherlands) Frenkie de Jong	Midfielder	1 January 2016	(Netherlands) Willem II	-
Substituted on	(Netherlands) Peter Leeuwenburgh	Goalkeeper	5 January 2016	(Netherlands) Dordrecht	-
Substituted on	(Netherlands) Richairo Zivkovic	Forward	31 January 2016	(Netherlands) Willem II	-
Substituted on	(Netherlands) Ruben Ligeon	Defender	31 January 2016	(Netherlands) Willem II	-

==== Departures ====
- The following players moved from AFC Ajax.

	Name	Position	Transfer type	New club	Fee
	Out on loan				
Substituted off	(Iceland) Óttar Magnús Karlsson	Forward	2 January 2015	(Netherlands) Sparta Rotterdam	-
Substituted off	(Morocco) Zakaria El Azzouzi	Forward	4 January 2015	(Netherlands) Twente	-
Substituted off	(Netherlands) Lerin Duarte	Midfielder	31 January 2015	(Netherlands) NAC Breda	-
Substituted off	(Netherlands) Ruben Ligeon	Defender	31 January 2016	(Netherlands) Utrecht	-
	Return from loan spell				
Substituted off	(France) Yaya Sanogo	Forward	31 January 2016	(England) Arsenal	-
	Free Transfer				
Substituted off	(Serbia) Dejan Meleg	Forward	3 January 2016	(Serbia) Vojvodina	-
Substituted off	(Netherlands) John Heitinga	Defender	31 January 2016	–	-
