= List of Dutch football transfers winter 2015–16 =

This is a list of transfers in Dutch football for the 2015-2016 winter transfer window. Only moves featuring an Eredivisie side are listed.

The winter transfer window will open on January 1, 2016, and will close on February 2, 2016. Deals may be signed at any given moment in the season, but the actual transfer may only take place during the transfer window. Unattached players may sign at any moment.

Date	Name	Moving from	Moving to	Fee
6 November 2015^{1}	(Norway) Alexander Sørloth	(Norway) Rosenborg BK	(Netherlands) FC Groningen	€550,000
10 November 2015^{1}	(Sweden) Arber Zeneli	(Sweden) IF Elfsborg	(Netherlands) Heerenveen	€1,950,000
4 December 2015	(Finland) Joonas Vanhanen	(Netherlands) Heracles Almelo	Unattached	Contract termination
6 December 2015	(Germany) Benjamin Kirsten	(Netherlands) NEC	Unattached	Contract termination
7 December 2015	(Netherlands) Ron Vlaar	Unattached	(Netherlands) AZ	Free transfer
15 December 2015^{1}	(Japan) Kosuke Ota	(Japan) FC Tokyo	(Netherlands) Vitesse Arnhem	Undisclosed
21 December 2015	(Serbia) Dejan Meleg	(Netherlands) Ajax	(Serbia) FK Vojvodina	Free transfer
31 December 2015	(Sierra Leone) Gibril Sankoh	(Netherlands) Roda JC	(China) Meizhou Hakka	Free transfer
31 December 2015	(Netherlands) Jordy Buijs	(Netherlands) Heerenveen	(Netherlands) Roda JC	Free transfer
3 January 2016	(Netherlands) Mark Diemers	(Netherlands) FC Utrecht	(Netherlands) De Graafschap	Loan
3 January 2016	(Peru) Luiz Humberto da Silva	(Peru) Sporting Cristal	(Netherlands) PSV	Free transfer
4 January 2016	(Australia) Brad Jones	(England) Bradford City	(Netherlands) NEC	Free transfer
5 January 2016	(Belgium) Jordy Vleugels	(Netherlands) Willem II	(Netherlands) FC Dordrecht	Loan
6 January 2016	(Iceland) Kristján Emilsson	(Netherlands) NEC	Retired	Contract termination
6 January 2016	(Poland) Sebastian Steblecki	(Netherlands) SC Cambuur	(Poland) Górnik Zabrze	Undisclosed
7 January 2016	(Turkey) Uğur İnceman	(Turkey) Konyaspor	(Netherlands) Roda JC	Free transfer
7 January 2016	(Sweden) Kristoffer Peterson	(Netherlands) FC Utrecht	(Netherlands) Roda JC	Loan
7 January 2016	(Belgium) Andy Kawaya	(Belgium) Anderlecht	(Netherlands) Willem II	Loan
7 January 2016	(Curaçao) Darryl Lachman	(England) Sheffield Wednesday	(Netherlands) SC Cambuur	Loan
8 January 2016	(Australia) Adam Sarota	(Netherlands) FC Utrecht	(Netherlands) Go Ahead Eagles	Free transfer
8 January 2016	(Netherlands) Joeri de Kamps	(Netherlands) NAC Breda	(Slovakia) Slovan Bratislava	Free transfer
9 January 2016	(Netherlands) Jeffrey Gouweleeuw	(Netherlands) AZ	(Germany) FC Augsburg	€3,000,000
9 January 2016	(Netherlands) Rydell Poepon	(Azerbaijan) Qarabağ FK	(Netherlands) Roda JC	Free transfer
10 January 2016	(Spain) Marcos Gullón	(Cyprus) Apollon Limassol	(Netherlands) Roda JC	Undisclosed
11 January 2016	(Netherlands) Tom Hiariej	(Netherlands) SC Cambuur	(Netherlands) FC Groningen	Loan
12 January 2016	(Morocco) Oussama Tannane	(Netherlands) Heracles	(France) Saint-Étienne	€1,500,000
15 January 2016	(Netherlands) Jordy ter Borgh	(Netherlands) Fortuna Sittard	(Netherlands) Heerenveen	Free transfer
15 January 2016	(Netherlands) Rens van Eijden	(Netherlands) NEC	(Russia) Dynamo Moscow	€500,000
17 January 2016	(Kazakhstan) Georgi Zhukov	(Belgium) Standard Liège	(Netherlands) Roda JC	Loan
19 January 2016	(Denmark) Dario Dumić	(Denmark) Brøndby IF	(Netherlands) NEC	Loan
19 January 2016	(Netherlands) Guus Hupperts	(Netherlands) AZ	(Netherlands) Willem II	Loan
21 January 2016	(Sweden) Mikael Dyrestam	(Norway) Aalesund	(Netherlands) NEC	Free transfer
21 January 2016	(Netherlands) Lex Immers	(Netherlands) Feyenoord	(England) Cardiff City	Loan
21 January 2016	(Belgium) Stijn Wuytens	(Netherlands) Willem II	(Netherlands) AZ	Undisclosed
21 January 2016	(Netherlands) Zakaria El Azzouzi	(Netherlands) Ajax	(Netherlands) FC Twente	Loan
22 January 2016	(Netherlands) Kai Heerings	(Netherlands) SC Cambuur	(Netherlands) Helmond Sport	Loan
23 January 2016	(Morocco) Mounir El Hamdaoui	(Netherlands) AZ	(Qatar) Umm Salal SC	Free transfer
23 January 2016	(Netherlands) Michiel Hemmen	(Sweden) BK Häcken	(Netherlands) Excelsior	Free transfer
24 January 2016	(Slovenia) Martin Milec	(Belgium) Standard Liège	(Netherlands) Roda JC	Loan
25 January 2016	(Sweden) Pär Hansson	(Sweden) Helsingborgs IF	(Netherlands) Feyenoord	Free transfer
25 January 2016	(Australia) Trent Sainsbury	(Netherlands) PEC Zwolle	(China) Jiangsu Suning	€1,000,000
26 January 2016	(Peru) Renato Tapia	(Netherlands) FC Twente	(Netherlands) Feyenoord	€2,400,000
26 January 2016	(Netherlands) Gervane Kastaneer	(Netherlands) ADO Den Haag	(Netherlands) FC Eindhoven	Loan
27 January 2016	(Nigeria) Bartholomew Ogbeche	(Netherlands) SC Cambuur	(Netherlands) Willem II	€300,000
27 January 2016	(Netherlands) Tom Overtoom	(Netherlands) Excelsior	(Netherlands) FC Emmen	Loan
28 January 2016	(Bosnia and Herzegovina) Boban Lazić	(Netherlands) PEC Zwolle	(Netherlands) VVV-Venlo	Loan
28 January 2016	(Netherlands) Rochdi Achenteh	(Netherlands) Vitesse Arnhem	(Netherlands) Willem II	Free transfer
28 January 2016	(Germany) Stefan Thesker	(Germany) Greuther Fürth	(Netherlands) FC Twente	Loan
29 January 2016	(Netherlands) Rai Vloet	(Netherlands) PSV	(Netherlands) SC Cambuur	Loan
29 January 2016	(Netherlands) Tarik Kada	(Netherlands) Heerenveen	(Netherlands) Heracles Almelo	Undisclosed
29 January 2016	(Netherlands) Johan Kappelhof	(Netherlands) FC Groningen	(United States) Chicago Fire	Undisclosed
31 January 2016	(Netherlands) Kevin van Veen	(England) Scunthorpe United	(Netherlands) SC Cambuur	Loan
1 February 2016	(Netherlands) Stijn Spierings	(Netherlands) AZ	(Netherlands) Sparta Rotterdam	Loan
1 February 2016	(Belgium) Nayib Lagouireh	(Netherlands) Roda JC	(Netherlands) Fortuna Sittard	Loan
1 February 2016	(Netherlands) Daryl Werker	(Netherlands) Roda JC	(Netherlands) MVV Maastricht	Loan
1 February 2016	(Turkey) Enes Ünal	(England) Manchester City	(Netherlands) NAC Breda	Loan
1 February 2016	(Netherlands) Mike van Duinen	(Germany) Fortuna Düsseldorf	(Netherlands) Roda JC	Loan
1 February 2016	(Netherlands) Kevin van Diermen	(Netherlands) Excelsior	(Netherlands) NAC Breda	Loan
1 February 2016	(Netherlands) Mitchel Paulissen	(Netherlands) Roda JC	(Netherlands) VVV-Venlo	Loan
1 February 2016	(Netherlands) Ruben Ligeon	(Netherlands) Ajax	(Netherlands) FC Utrecht	Loan
1 February 2016	(Netherlands) Kyle Ebecilio	(Netherlands) FC Twente	(Netherlands) ADO Den Haag	Loan
1 February 2016	(Poland) Oskar Zawada	(Germany) VfL Wolfsburg	(Netherlands) FC Twente	Loan
1 February 2016	(Nigeria) Abiola Dauda	(Netherlands) Vitesse Arnhem	(Scotland) Heart of Midlothian	Loan
1 February 2016	(Netherlands) Lerin Duarte	(Netherlands) Ajax	(Netherlands) NAC Breda	Loan
1 February 2016	(Turkey) Colin Kazim-Richards	(Netherlands) Feyenoord	(Scotland) Celtic	Undisclosed
1 February 2016	(Netherlands) Moussa Sanoh	(Netherlands) PSV	(Netherlands) RKC Waalwijk	Loan
1 February 2016	(Netherlands) Marco van Ginkel	(England) Chelsea	(Netherlands) PSV	Loan

== Notes ==
1. Transfer will take place on January 1, 2016.
