= Milan Vissie =

Dutch footballer (born 1995)

Personal information
- Full name: Milan Vissie
- Date of birth: 1 May 1995 (age 31)
- Place of birth: Hoorn, Netherlands
- Position: Midfielder

Youth career
- Hollandia
- –2012: AZ
- 2012–2014: Ajax

Senior career*
Years	Team	Apps	(Gls)
2014–2016	Jong Ajax	12	(1)
2016–2017	Cambuur U21	8	(1)
2017	Achilles '29 U21	?	(?)
2017–2018	Hollandia	?	(?)
2018–2019	ODIN '59	10	(0)
2019–2023	Hollandia	24	(2)
- * Club domestic league appearances and goals

Milan Vissie (born 1 May 1995) is a Dutch former professional footballer who played as a midfielder.

== Career ==
Vissie signed his first contract with Ajax on 1 July 2014, which kept him part of the club until 30 June 2016. The contract included an option for an extra year, until 30 June 2017. Vissie was added to Jong Ajax squad during the 2014–15 pre-season, with whom he played a few friendlies. On 12 July 2014, Vissie made his unofficial debut for the Ajax first team in a friendly against German club SV Hönnepel-Niedermörmter, replacing Lerin Duarte in the 60th minute. Vissie made his official professional football debut for Jong Ajax in the Eerste Divisie on 12 December 2014 in the away match against MVV, which ended in a 2–2 draw. Vissie came on the pitch for Danny Bakker after the break. Vissie scored his first official goal in professional football on 27 February 2015, in a 1–3 home loss against MVV. In the summer of 2016, his expiring contract was not extended by Ajax, making him a free agent.

Vissie signed with SC Cambuur in late-June 2016, where he would play on amateur level with the under-21 team. On 1 July 2016, he made his unofficial debut for the first team in a friendly against the amateurs of De Trije Doarpen. Vissie came into action for Cambuur in the first half.

After leaving Cambuur for the under-21 team of Achilles '29 in the summer of 2017, Vissie signed with his childhood club HVV Hollandia shortly after on 7 September 2017. The following year he joined ODIN '59, but returned to Hollandia after one season.
