= Indy Groothuizen =

Dutch footballer (born 1996)

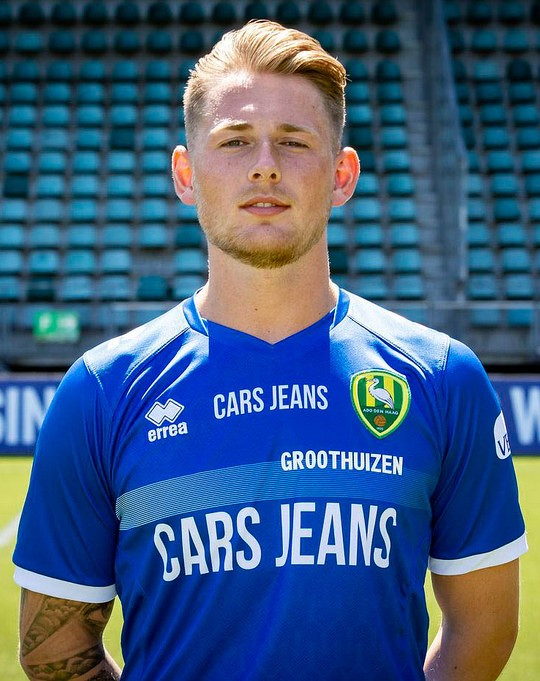
- Indy Groothuizen in 2018

Personal information
- Date of birth: 22 July 1996 (age 30)
- Place of birth: Alkmaar, Netherlands
- Height: 1.90 m (6 ft 3 in)
- Position: Goalkeeper

Youth career
- –2008: AFC '34
- 2008–2015: Ajax

Senior career*
Years	Team	Apps	(Gls)
2015–2017	Ajax	0	(0)
2014–2016	Jong Ajax	14	(0)
2016–2017	→ Nordsjælland (loan)	12	(0)
2017–2019	ADO Den Haag	18	(0)
2019–2021	Vejle	42	(0)
2021–2022	Emmen	0	(0)
2023–2024	AB	7	(0)
2024–2026	Spakenburg	1	(0)

International career
2012–2013	Netherlands U17	10	(0)
2013	Netherlands U18	3	(0)
2015–2016	Netherlands U20	6	(1)
2018	Netherlands U21	2	(0)
- * Club domestic league appearances and goals as of 23 October 2024

Indy Groothuizen (born 22 July 1996) is a Dutch professional footballer who plays as a goalkeeper.

== Club career ==
Groothuizen is a youth exponent from AFC Ajax. He made his professional debut at Jong Ajax on 8 December 2014 in an Eerste Divisie game against RKC Waalwijk. He replaced an injured Norbert Alblas after 88 minutes in a 3–2 home win.

On 31 July 2019, Groothuizen joined Danish 1st Division club Vejle Boldklub on a contract until June 2022. After two years in Denmark, Groothuizen returned to the Netherlands, signing a one-year deal on 14 July 2021 with FC Emmen with an option for one further year.

On 10 January 2023, Groothuizen joined Danish 2nd Division club AB. On January 22, AB confirmed that Groothuizen had left the club. He moved back to the Netherlands once more to play for amateur side Spakenburg, but had his contract terminated after a long-term injury saw him sidelined for over a year.

== International career ==
Groothuizen scored for the Netherlands U-20 in a November 2015 friendly against Czech Republic U-20. He played 10 games for the Netherlands national under-17 football team.

== Career statistics ==
As of match played 21 October 2017

Appearances and goals by club, season and competition
Club	Season	League			National Cup		Other		Total	
Club	Season	Division	Apps	Goals	Apps	Goals	Apps	Goals	Apps	Goals
Jong Ajax	2014–15	Eerste Divisie	4	0	—		—		4	0
Jong Ajax	2015–16	Eerste Divisie	10	0	—		—		10	0
Jong Ajax	Jong Ajax total		14	0	0	0	0	0	14	0
Nordsjælland (loan)	2016–17	Superligaen	12	0	0	0	—		12	0
Den Haag	2017–18	Eredivisie	5	0	0	0	0	0	5	0
Den Haag	2018-19	Eredivisie	11	0	0	0	0	0	11	0
Career total			42	0	0	0	0	0	42	0
