= Ilan Boccara =

Dutch footballer (born 1993)

Personal information
- Date of birth: 14 May 1993 (age 33)
- Place of birth: Boulogne-Billancourt, France
- Height: 1.78 m (5 ft 10 in)
- Position: Midfielder

Youth career
- 1999–2000: ES16
- 2000–2006: Boulogne-Billancourt
- 2006–2010: Paris Saint-Germain

Senior career*
Years	Team	Apps	(Gls)
2010–2012	Paris Saint-Germain II	29	(0)
2012–2015	Ajax	1	(0)
2013–2014	→ Évian (loan)	2	(0)
2013–2014	→ Évian II (loan)	8	(1)
2014–2015	Jong Ajax	4	(0)
2015–2016	Hapoel Kfar Saba	0	(0)
2016	Hapoel Jerusalem	1	(0)
Total		45	(1)

International career
2012	Netherlands U19	4	(0)
2012	Netherlands U20	2	(0)
- * Club domestic league appearances and goals

Ilan Boccara (born 14 May 1993) is a former professional footballer who played as a midfielder. He formerly played for Ajax where he was acquired from the youth ranks of Paris Saint-Germain. Born in France, he represented the Netherlands internationally at youth levels.

== Club career ==
=== Early career ===
Born in Boulogne-Billancourt, a western suburb of Paris to a Dutch mother and a French father, Boccara joined local club ES16 in the 16th arrondissement of Paris at the age of six. After one season, he transferred to Stade Français, to play for Athletic Club de Boulogne-Billancourt for the next five years.

=== Paris Saint-Germain ===
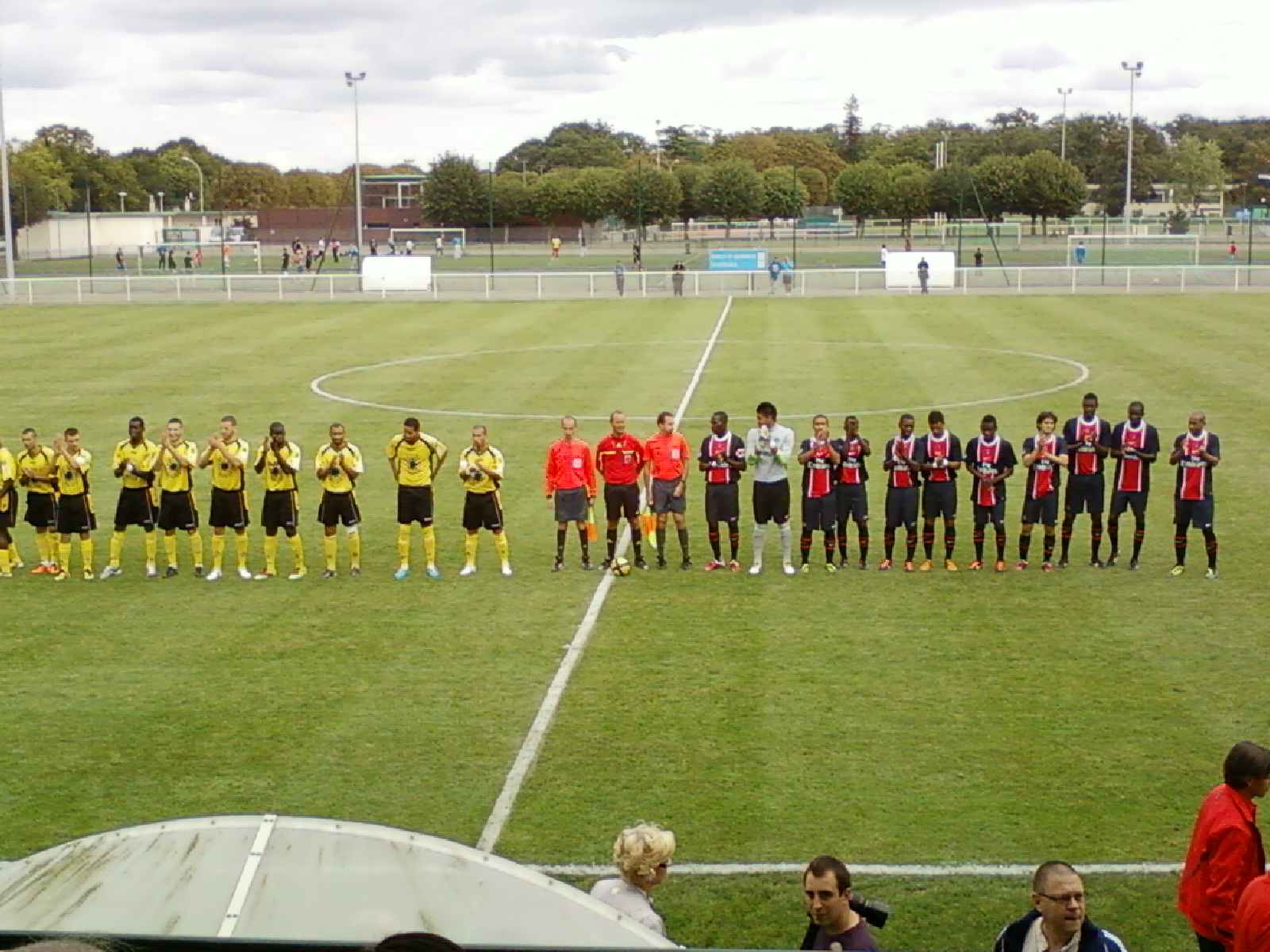
Ilan Boccara (4th from right) with PSG II (2011).

At the age of 13, Boccara was discovered by scouts of Paris Saint-Germain, who recruited him to their academy. After progressing through the youth system, he was promoted to the reserve squad playing in the Championnat de France amateur during the 2010–11 season. He spent most of the season on the bench.

In the 2011–12 season, Boccara played in 28 matches, starting in 26 of them. His performances earned Boccara a call-up to the Netherlands national under-19 team.

In 2011, Paris Saint-Germain was purchased by Qatar Sports Investments, which invested millions bringing in star footballers. Boccara decided on a transfer to Dutch club Ajax for regular game time, moving to his mother's hometown of Amsterdam.

=== Ajax ===
In the Summer of 2012, Boccara signed a three-year contract with Ajax, when the club paid a transfer fee of €500.000 to PSG for the young midfielder. Having started the season with Jong Ajax, Boccara was promoted to the first team in late August 2012, making his Eredivisie debut in the away match against Heerenveen as a substitute for Lasse Schöne in the 77th minute.

==== Loan to Evian ====
On 2 September 2013, it was announced that Boccara would be loaned to Ligue 1 club Evian for the 2013–14 season. Spending the first half of the season with the clubs reserves team, he made his debut for the first team of Evian on 8 March 2014 in a 1–0 away win against EA Guingamp.

=== Return to Ajax ===
Following his loan spell, Boccara returned to Amsterdam where he joined the reserves team Jong Ajax competing in the Eerste Divisie. He made four appearances during the 2014–15 season, playing his final match on 26 September 2014 in a 2–2 draw against FC Emmen. After spending the full 90-minutes on the bench in a 6–0 away loss to Sparta Rotterdam on 25 January 2015, Ajax announced the immediate release of Boccara on 2 March 2015. having only made a single appearance for the first team.

=== Israel and retirement ===
On 25 September 2015, it was announced that Boccara had signed with Israeli Premier League side Hapoel Kfar Saba. He made one appearance for the club. On 3 February 2016, Boccara moved to Hapoel Jerusalem. On 1 April, Boccara made his debut for the club in a 3–2 win over Hapoel Katamon Jerusalem. He came on in the 90th minute as a substitute for Gaëtan Varenne. In the end, this would be his only appearance. His contract expired on 1 July 2016. Boccara subsequently retired from football and became a personal coach in Tel Aviv.

== International career ==
Boccara played for Netherlands at U-19 level. He made third place with Jong Oranje at the Festival International Espoirs 2012 in Toulon, France. He holds dual citizenship and is still eligible to represent either Netherlands or France at senior level, and has expressed his interest in playing for Netherlands.

He played for Team France in Israel at the 2017 Maccabiah Games.

== Personal life ==
Boccara is Jewish, and is the second cousin of chairman of the board of directors at AFC Ajax, Michael Kinsbergen by way of his mother.

== Career statistics ==
Appearances and goals by club, season and competition
Club	Season	League			Cup (Note: Includes Coupe de France, KNVB Cup.)		Europe		Total	
Club	Season	Division	Apps	Goals	Apps	Goals	Apps	Goals	Apps	Goals
Paris Saint-Germain II	2010–11	CFA	1	0	0	0	—		1	0
Paris Saint-Germain II	2011–12	CFA	28	0	0	0	—		28	0
Paris Saint-Germain II	Total		29	0	0	0	—		29	0
Ajax	2012–13	Eredivisie	1	0	0	0	0	0	1	0
Evian (loan)	2013–14	Ligue 1	2	0	1	0	—		3	0
Evian II (loan)	2013–14	CFA 2	8	1	–		—		8	1
Jong Ajax	2014–15	Eerste Divisie	4	0	—		—		4	0
Hapoel Jerusalem	2015–16	Liga Leumit	1	0	0	0	—		1	0
Career total			45	1	1	0	0	0	46	1

== Honours ==
Ajax

- Eredivisie: 2012–13
