= Damon Mirani =

Dutch footballer (born 1996)

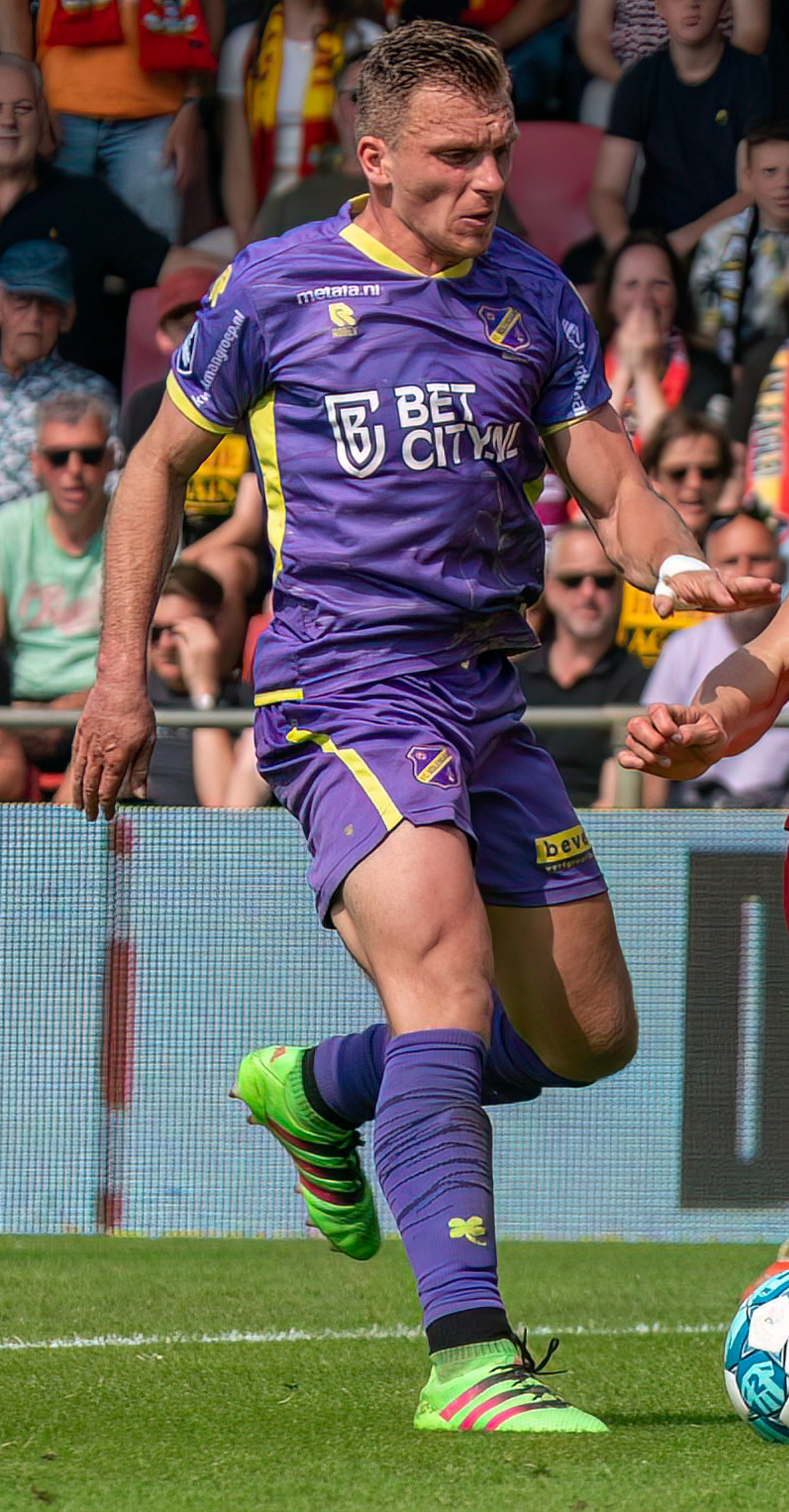
- Mirani with Volendam in 2023

Personal information
- Date of birth: 13 May 1996 (age 30)
- Place of birth: Monnickendam, Netherlands
- Height: 1.83 m (6 ft 0 in)
- Position: Centre-back

Team information
- Current team: Heracles Almelo
- Number: 4

Youth career
- VV Monnickendam
- Volendam
- 2012–2016: Ajax

Senior career*
| Years | Team | Apps | (Gls) |
| 2013–2016 | Jong Ajax | 24 | (0) |
| 2016–2021 | Almere City | 163 | (14) |
| 2021–2024 | Volendam | 103 | (10) |
| 2024– | Heracles Almelo | 79 | (7) |

International career
| 2013 | Netherlands U17 | 6 | (2) |
| 2013 | Netherlands U18 | 2 | (0) |
| 2014–2015 | Netherlands U19 | 6 | (1) |
- * Club domestic league appearances and goals as of 08:54, 28 October 2026 (UTC)

Damon Mirani (born 13 May 1996) is a Dutch professional footballer who plays as a centre-back for Eerste Divisie club Heracles Almelo.

== Club career ==
=== Ajax ===
Mirani began his football career in the under-8 of VV Monnickendam before moving to Volendam. At the end of the 2011–12 season, he was admitted to the Ajax academy. On 15 March 2013, he signed his first professional contract with the club, binding him to the club until 30 June 2016. At the end of the 2012–13 season, Mirani was crowned Talent van De Toekomst (Talent of the Future) while playing for Ajax B1, the under-17 team.

Mirani began the 2013–14 season playing for Ajax A1, the under-19 team. With the unavailability of several players, he made his professional debut for Jong Ajax against Achilles '29 in an Eerste Divisie match on 8 September 2013, coming on for Tom Noordhoff as a half-time substitute. On 28 June 2014, Mirani made his unofficial debut for the Ajax first team in a friendly against SDC Putten which was won 13–1. Mirani replaced Kenny Tete after the break and scored the 7–0 from a corner-kick in the 50th minute.

In March 2016, it was announced that Mirani's expiring contract would not be extended, which meant that he could start looking for a new club. Mirani made a total of 24 appearances for Jong Ajax in three seasons, and failed to make his official first-team debut.

=== Almere City ===
On 31 May 2016, Mirani signed a two-year contract with Eerste Divisie club Almere City. He made his official debut for Almere City on 5 August in an away match against Volendam. The match ended in a 1–1 draw. Mirani quickly grew into a starter at centre-back for Almere. On 7 April 2017, he scored his first professional goal in a 3–2 league loss to VVV-Venlo. He missed the end of the regular season and the playoffs due to an injury.

Mirani remained a starter for the next three seasons, leading Almere City to the promotion playoffs three times without success. In 2018, they came closest but lost the final to De Graafschap. Over five seasons, Mirani played 180 matches for Almere City, scoring 16 goals.

=== Volendam ===
On 15 June 2021, Mirani moved to Volendam on a two-year contract, a club where he already worked part-time as a youth coach. Mirani thus returned to the club he had left at sixteen for an opportunity at Ajax. At Volendam, he reunited with coach Wim Jonk, his former coach in the Ajax youth team. Mirani was appointed captain upon arrival and made an immediate impact by scoring the opening goal in his debut on 6 August 2021, against FC Eindhoven. The match ended in a 2–2 draw. In his first season, Mirani was a starter and played every minute of every match. On 22 April 2022, he helped Volendam secure promotion to the Eredivisie with a 2–1 victory over Den Bosch.

In the 2022–23 season, Mirani continued to play every match in full until the winter break. During the break, coach Wim Jonk named Carel Eiting as the new captain, replacing Mirani. On 14 January 2023, in a match against RKC Waalwijk, Mirani was substituted for the first time in over sixty matches. On 21 April, he scored both goals in a 2–0 win against Cambuur. Despite a loss to Go Ahead Eagles a month later, FC Volendam secured their Eredivisie status.

In March 2024, Volendam announced that Mirani's contract was expiring and that he would decide on his future at the end of the season. In May 2024, Volendam were relegated from the Eredivisie following a defeat against Ajax.

=== Heracles ===
On 5 June 2024, Mirani signed a three-year contract with Heracles Almelo.

== Career statistics ==
As of match played 23 October 2026

Appearances and goals by club, season and competition
| Club | Season | League | | | Cup | | Other | | Total | |
| Club | Season | Division | Apps | Goals | Apps | Goals | Apps | Goals | Apps | Goals |
|---|---|---|---|---|---|---|---|---|---|---|
| Jong Ajax | 2013–14 | Eerste Divisie | 1 | 0 | — | | — | | 1 | 0 |
| Jong Ajax | 2014–15 | Eerste Divisie | 4 | 0 | — | | — | | 4 | 0 |
| Jong Ajax | 2015–16 | Eerste Divisie | 19 | 0 | — | | — | | 19 | 0 |
| Jong Ajax | Total | | 24 | 0 | — | | — | | 24 | 0 |
| Almere City | 2016–17 | Eerste Divisie | 33 | 1 | 2 | 0 | — | | 35 | 1 |
| Almere City | 2017–18 | Eerste Divisie | 31 | 3 | 2 | 0 | 6 (Note: Appearances in the Eerste Divisie promotion play-offs) | 3 | 39 | 6 |
| Almere City | 2018–19 | Eerste Divisie | 32 | 4 | 2 | 0 | 2 | 0 | 36 | 4 |
| Almere City | 2019–20 | Eerste Divisie | 29 | 0 | 1 | 0 | — | | 30 | 0 |
| Almere City | 2020–21 | Eerste Divisie | 38 | 5 | 1 | 0 | 1 | 0 | 40 | 5 |
| Almere City | Total | | 163 | 13 | 8 | 0 | 9 | 0 | 180 | 13 |
| Volendam | 2021–22 | Eerste Divisie | 38 | 4 | 1 | 0 | — | | 39 | 4 |
| Volendam | 2022–23 | Eredivisie | 31 | 3 | 2 | 0 | — | | 33 | 3 |
| Volendam | 2023–24 | Eredivisie | 34 | 3 | 1 | 0 | — | | 35 | 3 |
| Volendam | Total | | 103 | 10 | 4 | 0 | — | | 107 | 10 |
| Heracles Almelo | 2024–25 | Eredivisie | 34 | 2 | 3 | 1 | — | | 37 | 3 |
| Heracles Almelo | 2025–26 | Eredivisie | 33 | 3 | 3 | 0 | — | | 36 | 3 |
| Heracles Almelo | 2026–27 | Eerste Divisie | 12 | 2 | 0 | 0 | — | | 12 | 2 |
| Heracles Almelo | Total | | 79 | 7 | 6 | 1 | — | | 85 | 8 |
| Career total | | | 369 | 30 | 18 | 1 | 9 | 0 | 396 | 31 |

== Honours ==
Individual

- Ajax Talent of the Future: 2012–13
- Eredivisie Team of the Month: April 2023
