= Mattijs Branderhorst =

Dutch footballer (born 1993)

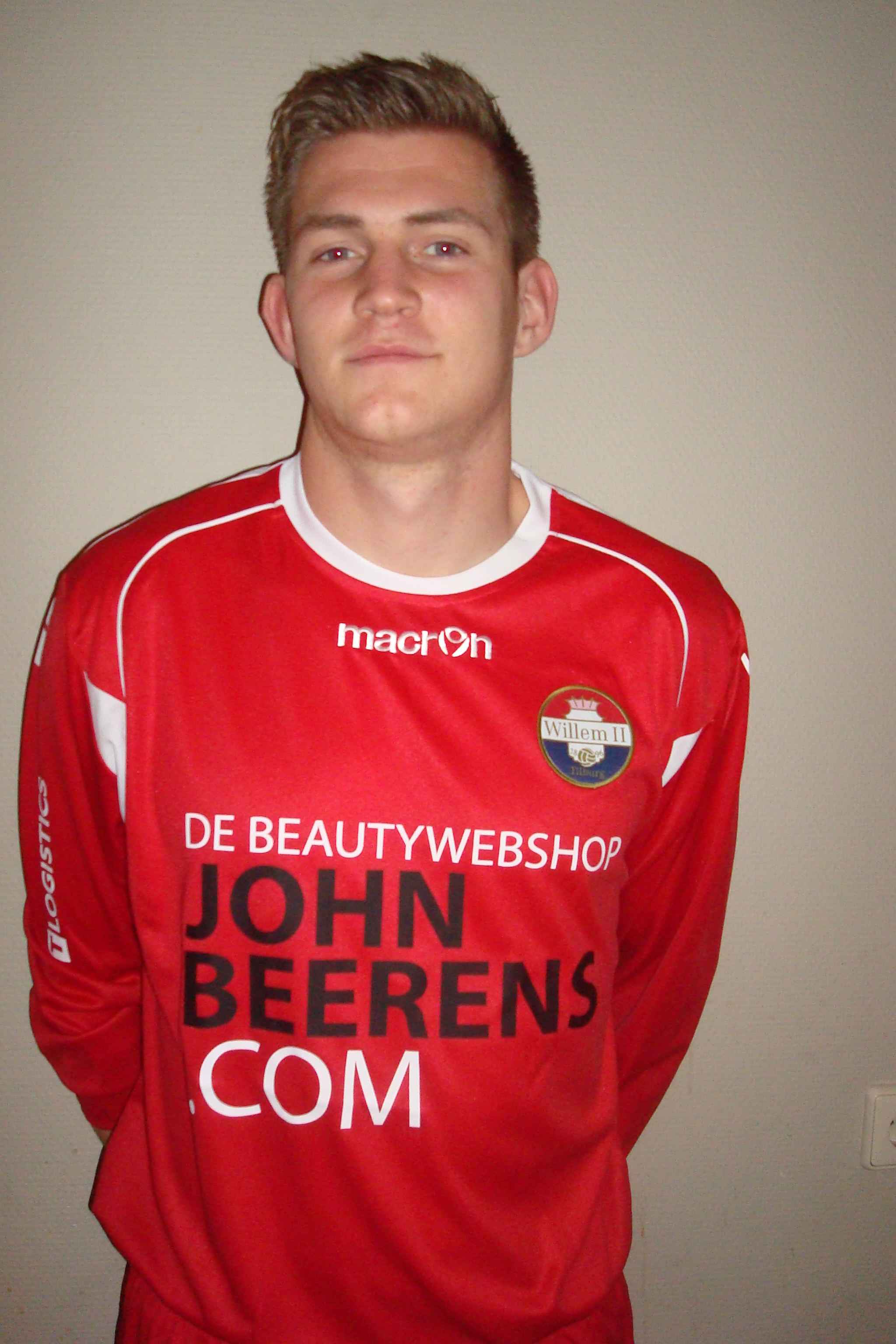
- Branderhorst with Willem II in 2013

Personal information
- Date of birth: 31 December 1993 (age 32)
- Place of birth: Tiel, Netherlands
- Height: 1.92 m (6 ft 4 in)
- Position: Goalkeeper

Team information
- Current team: Fortuna Sittard
- Number: 31

Youth career
- –2009: Theole
- 2009–2015: Willem II

Senior career*
Years	Team	Apps	(Gls)
2015–2019	Willem II	21	(0)
2015–2016	→ MVV (loan)	5	(0)
2019	→ NEC (loan)	16	(0)
2019–2023	NEC	79	(0)
2023–	Jong Utrecht	1	(0)
2023–2025	Utrecht	5	(0)
2024–2025	→ Fortuna Sittard (loan)	28	(0)
2025–	Fortuna Sittard	36	(0)
- * Club domestic league appearances and goals as of 11:01, 17 November 2026 (UTC)

Mattijs Branderhorst (born 31 December 1993) is a Dutch professional footballer who plays as a goalkeeper for Eredivisie club Fortuna Sittard.

== Club career ==
=== Willem II ===
Branderhorst came through the youth ranks at Willem II from his childhood club Theole. On 18 November 2011, he was included in the first-team squad for the first time. In a match against Almere City, manager Jurgen Streppel kept him on the bench for the entire game. In the years that followed, Branderhorst became a regular starter in the reserve team of the Tilburg-based side, which featured players such as Virgil van Dijk and Frenkie de Jong.

Branderhorst was loaned to MVV in 2015. There, he made his professional debut on 13 September 2015 as a substitute for the injured Jo Coppens against NAC Breda.

He made his debut for Willem II on 15 October 2017 in the home match against FC Twente. In the match, he made the start for the injured Timon Wellenreuther.

=== NEC ===
On 28 January 2019, Branderhorst was loaned to NEC for the remainder of the season. On 1 February, he made his debut in the 4–1 home win over Jong FC Utrecht. After the loan ended, NEC brought him to Nijmegen on a permanent deal, with him signing a contract for two seasons.

The second season he was the undisputed starter in goal and played all matches until the competition was shut down due to the COVID-19 pandemic. He started the 2020–21 season as second goalkeeper, behind Norbert Alblas, who had recovered from an injury. He did, however, start the two KNVB Cup matches against Fortuna Sittard and VVV-Venlo. On 26 February 2021, manager Rogier Meijer decided to switch goalkeepers: after a number of unfortunate performances by Alblas, Branderhorst became the starting goalkeeper again. On 23 May, Branderhorst won promotion with NEC to the Eredivisie, by beating NAC Breda 2–1 in the final of the play-offs. He signed a new two-year contract on 22 June 2021.

In his first season with NEC in the Eredivisie, he was the starting goalkeeper after winning the position battle with Danny Vukovic. He immediately managed to keep three clean sheets in the first four games. That season, only Remko Pasveer of Ajax and Lars Unnerstall from Twente had more clean sheets than Branderhorst. Despite his strong performances through the season, NEC brought back Netherlands international goalkeeper Jasper Cillessen, who they signed from Valencia in August 2022, demoting Branderhorst to backup for the 2022–23 season.

=== Utrecht ===
In July 2023, he signed for FC Utrecht.

On 24 July 2024, Branderhorst joined Fortuna Sittard on loan.

== Career statistics ==
As of match played 3 March 2024

Appearances and goals by club, season and competition
Club	Season	League			Cup		Continental		Other		Total	
Club	Season	Division	Apps	Goals	Apps	Goals	Apps	Goals	Apps	Goals	Apps	Goals
Willem II	2015–16	Eredivisie	0	0	0	0	—		—		0	0
Willem II	2016–17	Eredivisie	0	0	0	0	—		—		0	0
Willem II	2017–18	Eredivisie	20	0	4	0	—		—		24	0
Willem II	2018–19	Eredivisie	1	0	2	0	—		—		3	0
Willem II	Total		21	0	6	0	—		—		27	0
MVV (loan)	2015–16	Eerste Divisie	5	0	1	0	—		—		6	0
NEC (loan)	2018–19	Eerste Divisie	16	0	0	0	—		2 (Note: Appearances in the Eredivisie promotion/relegation play-offs)	0	18	0
NEC	2019–20	Eerste Divisie	29	0	1	0	—		—		30	0
NEC	2020–21	Eerste Divisie	14	0	2	0	—		3	0	19	0
NEC	2021–22	Eredivisie	34	0	0	0	—		—		34	0
NEC	2022–23	Eredivisie	2	0	3	0	—		—		5	0
NEC	Total		95	0	6	0	—		5	0	106	0
Utrecht	2023–24	Eredivisie	5	0	2	0	—		0	0	7	0
Career total			126	0	15	0	—		5	0	146	0
