= Abdelhak Nouri =

Dutch footballer (born 1997)

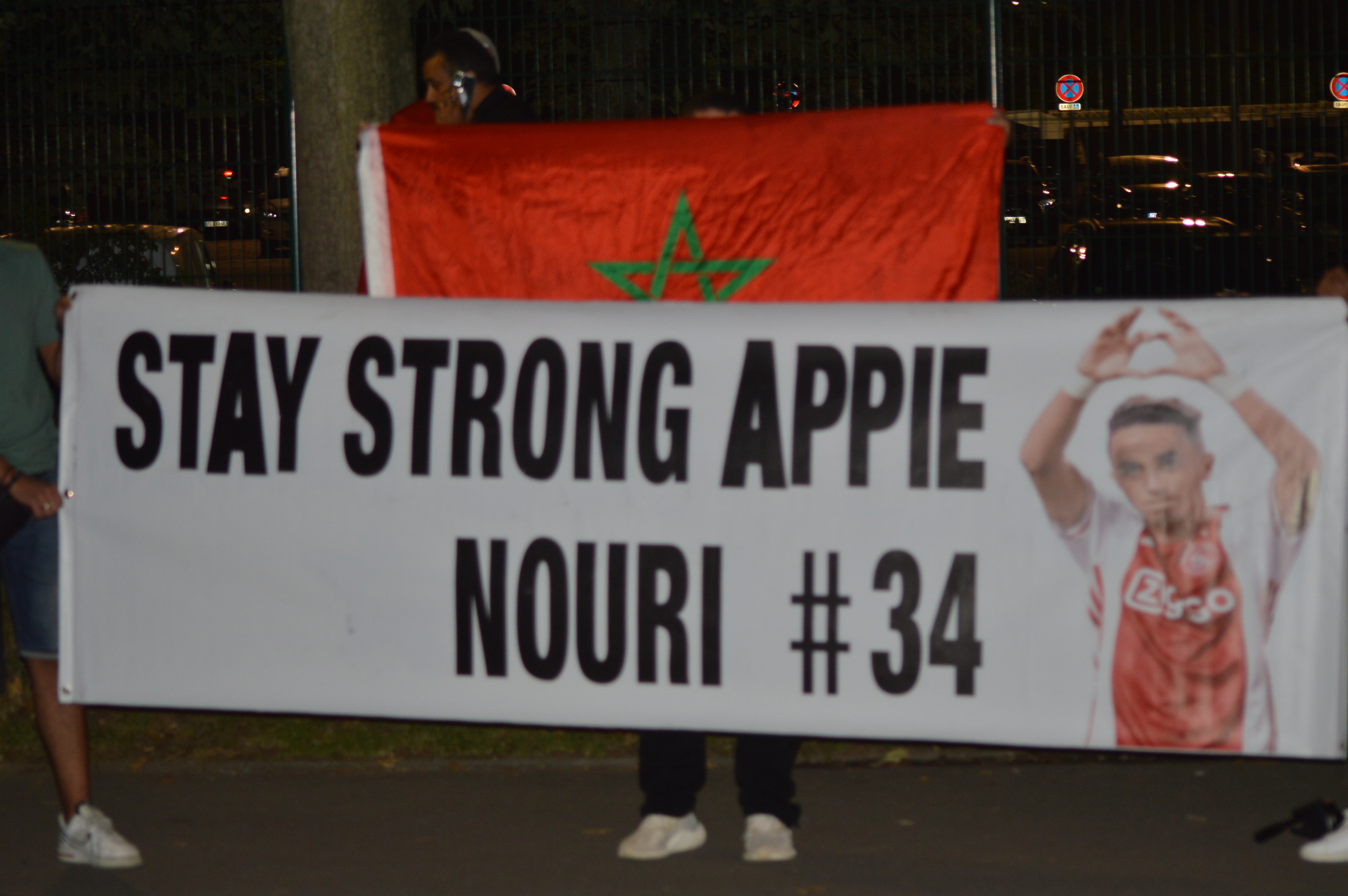
- A banner held up in support of Nouri

Personal information
- Full name: Abdelhak Nouri
- Date of birth: 2 April 1997 (age 29)
- Place of birth: Amsterdam, Netherlands
- Height: 1.67 m (5 ft 6 in)
- Position: Midfielder

Youth career
- 2002–2003: SC Eendracht '82
- 2003–2004: RKSV DCG
- 2004–2015: Ajax

Senior career*
Years	Team	Apps	(Gls)
2015–2017	Jong Ajax	45	(11)
2015–2017	Ajax	9	(0)
Total		54	(11)

International career
2012	Netherlands U15	1	(0)
2012–2013	Netherlands U16	2	(0)
2013–2014	Netherlands U17	12	(5)
2014	Netherlands U18	2	(0)
2014–2016	Netherlands U19	23	(9)
2016	Netherlands U20	5	(0)
2017	Netherlands U21	1	(0)
Medal record
Representing Netherlands
UEFA European Under-17 Championship
Runner-up	Malta 2014	U-17 Team
- * Club domestic league appearances and goals

Abdelhak "Appie" Nouri (born 2 April 1997) is a Dutch former professional footballer who played as a midfielder. He operated primarily as an attacking midfielder, but could also be deployed as a winger.

A youth product of Eredivisie club Ajax, Nouri played two years of senior football with its reserve team and the first team. He also represented the Netherlands at various youth levels.

In July 2017, at age 20, during a pre-season friendly match, Nouri collapsed and suffered a cardiac arrhythmia attack, which left him with severe and permanent brain damage and unable to continue his career as a footballer. He is now mainly bedridden and his family now take extensive care of him.

== Early life ==
Nouri was born in Amsterdam and is of Moroccan descent. A promising youth player, he was named as one of the best 40 youth players in the world by The Guardian in 2014, before he made his professional debut.

== Club career ==
Nouri was a youth exponent from the academy at Ajax, and made his professional debut for the reserve side, Jong Ajax, on 13 March 2015, in an Eerste Divisie game against VVV Venlo, replacing Danny Bakker after 78 minutes in a 1–0 loss.

On 21 September 2016, Nouri made his official first-team debut in a KNVB Cup match against Willem II, and scored a goal. His exploits throughout the season for Jong Ajax saw him being gifted the Player of the Season award for the 2016–17 season, as well as promotion to the first team for the 2017–18 season. He also played three matches in the 2016–17 UEFA Europa League as Ajax finished as runners-up.

== International career ==
Nouri represented Netherlands at multiple youth levels, including playing at the 2014 UEFA European Under-17 Championship and the 2015 UEFA European Under-19 Championship.

== Collapse ==
Jan Mulder talks about Nouri in a broadcast from De Wereld Draait Door, 9 January 2018 (in Dutch)

On 8 July 2017, Nouri collapsed during a friendly match against Werder Bremen, due to cardiac arrhythmia. He was taken to the hospital by a trauma helicopter, and his condition was announced as stable. Five days later, however, Ajax reported that Nouri had suffered severe and permanent brain damage as a direct result of the incident, and was in intensive care. Nouri eventually left intensive care on 25 July 2017, being able to breathe unaided, but not able to play football again. In June 2018, Ajax announced an investigation had found that the medical treatment Nouri received on the field was "inadequate", which prompted a lawsuit from Nouri's family against Ajax through the Royal Dutch Football Association's arbitration panel, who stated a failure to resuscitate him with due haste was responsible for causing his brain damage.

By August 2018, Nouri was no longer in a coma. By September 2019, Nouri was confirmed to still be in hospital. On 27 March 2020, Nouri's family confirmed he had awoken from his coma and returned home to his family, where he will continue to receive treatment. Shortly afterwards, Ajax announced they cancelled Nouri's contract, which was due to automatically renew on 1 July, and that they were in talks with his family about a "future solution" for Nouri. In February 2022, Ajax announced the agreement with Nouri's family included a payment of €7.85 million, that the club would cover all his medical bills, and would retire his number 34 jersey.

In April 2024, Nouri's brother, Abderrahim, stated that he was "awake" but still "isn't his old self."

=== Tributes ===
Following Nouri's retirement, several tributes were conducted in his honour in and outside football. In December 2018, Ajax renamed their "Talent of the Future" award after Nouri, while a number of Nouri's former club and international teammates, including Justin Kluivert, Philippe Sandler, Amin Younes, Donny van de Beek, Kevin Diks, Joël Veltman, Anwar El Ghazi, Steven Bergwijn, Sofyan Amrabat and Chadi Riad adopted Nouri's shirt number (34) at their new clubs. Ajax's 34th league championship was dedicated to Nouri by the players, who celebrated with his father during the trophy presentation in May 2019. On 12 June 2022, a square in Amsterdam Nieuw-West was renamed the "A. Nouri Plein". On 2 July 2026, Ismail Saibari and Bayern Munich announced that he would wear the number 34 shirt following his transfer to the club, in tribute to Nouri.

== Career statistics ==
Appearances and goals by club, season and competition
Club	Season	League			KNVB Cup		Europe		Total	
Club	Season	Division	Apps	Goals	Apps	Goals	Apps	Goals	Apps	Goals
Jong Ajax	2014–15	Eerste Divisie	2	0	—		—		2	0
Jong Ajax	2015–16	Eerste Divisie	17	1	—		—		17	1
Jong Ajax	2016–17	Eerste Divisie	26	10	—		—		26	10
Jong Ajax	Total		45	11	—		—		45	11
Ajax	2016–17	Eredivisie	9	0	3	1	3 (Note: Three appearances in UEFA Europa League)	0	15	1
Ajax	2017–18	Eredivisie	—		—		—		—	
Career total			54	11	3	1	3	0	60	12

== Honours ==
Ajax

- Eredivisie: runner-up 2016–17
- UEFA Europa League: runner-up 2016–17

Netherlands U17

- UEFA European Under-17 Championship: runner-up 2014

Individual

- Best player of AEGON Future Cup: 2014
- UEFA European Under-19 Championship Team of the Tournament: 2016
- Eerste Divisie Player of the Season: 2016–17

== See also ==
- List of people who awoke from a coma
