= Mauro Savastano =

Dutch footballer

Personal information
- Full name: Mauro Alessio Savastano
- Date of birth: 16 April 1997 (age 29)
- Place of birth: Zaandam, Netherlands
- Position: Left-back

Youth career
- ZVV Zaanlandia
- –2007: HFC Haarlem
- 2007–2015: Ajax

Senior career*
Years	Team	Apps	(Gls)
2015–2018	Jong Ajax	34	(0)
2018	→ Go Ahead Eagles (loan)	5	(0)
2018–2020	Jong AZ	45	(1)
2021–2023	Dordrecht	60	(4)
2023–2024	Fremad Amager	19	(0)

International career
2013–2014	Netherlands U17	3	(0)
2014	Netherlands U18	4	(0)
- * Club domestic league appearances and goals as of 23 April 2024

Mauro Alessio Savastano (born 16 April 1997) is a retired Dutch professional footballer who played as a defender.

== Club career ==
Savastano is a youth exponent from Ajax. He made his professional debut for Jong Ajax on 16 March 2015 in an Eerste Divisie game against Fortuna Sittard replacing Terry Lartey Sanniez at half-time in a 3–0 home win.

In July 2021, Savastano signed with Dordrecht after having spent a year as a free agent following his release by Jong AZ in June 2020.

On 19 September 2023, Savastano signed a contract with Danish 2nd Division club Fremad Amager.

On August 12, 2024, Fremad Amager confirmed that 27-year-old Savastano ended his career with immediate effect.

== Personal life ==
Born in the Netherlands, Savastano is of Italian descent.
