= Joost Meendering =

Dutch footballer (born 1997)

Personal information
- Date of birth: 26 June 1997 (age 29)
- Height: 1.85 m (6 ft 1 in)
- Position: Goalkeeper

Team information
- Current team: ODIN '59
- Number: 1

Youth career
- –2007: VV Hollandia T
- 2007–2009: AFC '34
- 2009–2010: FC Volendam
- 2010–2015: Ajax Youth Academy

Senior career*
Years	Team	Apps	(Gls)
2015–2016	HVV Hollandia		
2016–2018	Jong FC Utrecht	10	(0)
2018–2019	Swift		
2019–	ODIN '59	2	(0)

International career
2012	Netherlands U-15	1	(0)
2013	Netherlands U-17	1	(0)
- * Club domestic league appearances and goals as of 00:01, 2 September 2019 (UTC)

Joost Meendering (born 26 June 1997) is a Dutch football player who plays for ODIN '59.

He made his professional debut in the Eerste Divisie for Jong FC Utrecht on 17 February 2017 in a game against Fortuna Sittard.

On 2 March 2019, it was confirmed that Meendering had joined ODIN '59.

RuneScape Career

During his primary school years, Joost Meendering was an avid player of the online game series RuneScape. He spent a great deal of time in the game's virtual world during this period, amassing significant virtual wealth. Additionally, he achieved the maximum level—level 99—in various skills on multiple occasions. Through intensive RuneScape gameplay, Meendering developed his command of the English language in a relatively short time. Constant interaction with English-speaking players, exposure to in-game text, and online communication contributed to this language development. The English language skills he acquired proved valuable later in his career.
