= Sanny Monteiro =

Dutch footballer

Personal information
- Date of birth: 11 December 1989 (age 36)
- Place of birth: Rotterdam, Netherlands
- Height: 1.83 m (6 ft 0 in)
- Position: Right-back

Team information
- Current team: Sportlust '46
- Number: 20

Youth career
- Zwaluwen
- Willem II

Senior career*
Years	Team	Apps	(Gls)
2012–2013	Willem II	1	(0)
2013–2015	FC Oss	35	(1)
2015–2016	Zwaluwen		
2016–2019	Kozakken Boys	97	(9)
2019–2021	IJsselmeervogels	25	(1)
2021–2022	Rijnsburgse Boys	2	(0)
2022	Spakenburg	20	(2)
2022–	Sportlust '46	95	(8)
- * Club domestic league appearances and goals as of 5 August 2025

Sanny Monteiro (born 11 December 1989) is a Dutch professional footballer who plays as a right-back for Derde Divisie club Sportlust '46.
