= Elton Acolatse =

Dutch footballer (born 1995)

Personal information
- Full name: Elton-Ofoi Acolatse
- Date of birth: 25 July 1995 (age 31)
- Place of birth: Amsterdam, Netherlands
- Height: 1.82 m (6 ft 0 in)
- Position: Winger

Team information
- Current team: Al-Hazem
- Number: 7

Youth career
- 2003–2013: Ajax

Senior career*
Years	Team	Apps	(Gls)
2013–2016	Jong Ajax	64	(6)
2016–2017	Westerlo	28	(6)
2017–2018	Club Brugge	0	(0)
2017–2018	→ Sint-Truiden	14	(1)
2018–2020	Sint-Truiden	59	(2)
2020	→ Hapoel Be'er Sheva	10	(0)
2020–2023	Hapoel Be'er Sheva	28	(1)
2021–2022	→ Bursaspor	16	(0)
2023	Ashdod	14	(3)
2023–2026	Diósgyőr	72	(16)
2026	Ferencváros	7	(2)
2026–	Al-Hazem	4	(0)

International career^{‡}
2011–2012	Netherlands U17	13	(1)
2013–2014	Netherlands U19	7	(1)
2014–2015	Netherlands U20	1	(0)
Medal record
Men's football
Representing Netherlands
UEFA European Under-17 Championship
Winner	2012 Slovenia
- * Club domestic league appearances and goals as of 16 October 2026 ‡ National team caps and goals as of 02:18, 16 February 2026

Elton-Ofoi Acolatse (Dutch pronunciation: [ɛl.tɔn oˈfɔi a.koˈlɑt.sə]; bron 25 July 1995) is a Dutch professional footballer who plays as a winger for Saudi Pro League club Al-Hazem FC.

== Club career ==
=== Ajax ===
Born in Amsterdam to Ghanaian parents, Acolatse joined the Ajax Youth Academy in 2003. He played for the under-19 Ajax A1 team during the 2012–13 season. On 27 April 2012, Acolatse signed a three-year contract with Ajax, tying him down to the club until 30 June 2015. He made his professional debut for the reserves team Jong Ajax, starting in a 4–0 away defeat to FC Emmen in Eerste Divisie on 17 January 2014. He was substituted off in the 60th minute for Vincent Vermeij.

=== Westerlo ===
On 21 July 2016, it was announced that Acolatse had signed a three-year contract with Belgian club K.V.C. Westerlo. On 31 July 2016, he made his debut for Westerlo on the first matchday of the season against Standard Liège. The match ended in a 2–2 draw with Acolatse scoring the 1–1 equaliser after 30 minutes.

=== Club Brugge ===
On 5 April 2017, it was announced that Club Brugge had signed Acolatse to a four-year contract, joining the club on a free transfer from KVC Westerlo.

=== Sint-Truiden ===
He only spent one season contracted to Brugge, when he was on loan to Sint-Truiden. He then joined the club permanently.

=== Hapoel Be'er Sheva ===
After two years at Sint-Truiden, Acolatse moved to Hapoel Be'er Sheva of Israel on loan, with an option for the club to buy him. He scored his debut goal against Motherwell in the Europa League third qualifying round. In the 2020–21 Europa League group stage, he scored two goals in the 86th and 88th minutes respectively (including one from the middle of the field) as his side defeated Slavia Prague 3–1.

== Career statistics ==
=== Club ===
As of match played 2 August 2017

Appearances and goals by club, season and competition
Club	Season	League			National cup		Europe		Other		Total	
Club	Season	Division	Apps	Goals	Apps	Goals	Apps	Goals	Apps	Goals	Apps	Goals
Jong Ajax	2013–14	Eerste Divisie	2	0	—		—		—		2	0
Jong Ajax	2014–15	Eerste Divisie	36	5	—		—		—		36	5
Jong Ajax	2015–16	Eerste Divisie	6	0	—		—		—		6	0
Jong Ajax	Total		44	5	—		—		—		44	5
Westerlo	2016–17	Belgian First Division A	28	6	1	0	—		0	0	29	6
Club Brugge	2017–18	Belgian First Division A	0	0	0	0	0	0	0	0	0	0
Career total			72	11	1	0	0	0	0	0	73	11

== Honours ==
Hapoel Beer Sheva

- Israeli State Cup: 2019–20

Netherlands U17

- UEFA European Under-17 Football Championship: 2012

Individual

- Nemzeti Bajnokság I Goal of the Month: September 2025
- Nemzeti Bajnokság I Player of the Month: November 2025
