= Terry Lartey Sanniez =

Dutch footballer (born 1996)

Personal information
- Date of birth: 10 August 1996 (age 30)
- Place of birth: Amsterdam, Netherlands
- Height: 1.74 m (5 ft 9 in)
- Position: Right-back

Team information
- Current team: Grindavík
- Number: 25

Youth career
- 2008–2015: Ajax

Senior career*
Years	Team	Apps	(Gls)
2015–2018	Jong Ajax	81	(0)
2018–2021	NEC	43	(0)
2021–2022	Celje	14	(0)
2022–2023	NEC	9	(0)
2025–	Grindavík	7	(0)

International career
2010–2011	Netherlands U15	5	(0)
2011–2012	Netherlands U16	4	(0)
2012–2013	Netherlands U17	3	(0)
2013	Netherlands U18	3	(0)
2014–2015	Netherlands U19	4	(0)
2015–2016	Netherlands U20	3	(0)
2016	Netherlands U21	1	(0)
- * Club domestic league appearances and goals as of 15 October 2025

Terry Lartey Sanniez (born 10 August 1996) is a Dutch professional footballer who plays as a right-back for Icelandic club Grindavík.

== Club career ==
Lartey Sanniez is a youth product of AFC Ajax. He made his professional debut at Jong Ajax on 25 January 2015 in an Eerste Divisie game against Sparta Rotterdam. He replaced Elton Acolatse after 57 minutes in a 6–0 away defeat.

On 31 August 2021, Lartey Sanniez signed a two-year contract with Slovenian PrvaLiga side Celje.

On 31 August 2022, he signed a one-year deal with NEC. He made his Eredivisie debut on 16 September 2022, replacing Magnus Mattsson in the 76th minute of a 0–0 away draw against FC Utrecht.

== International career ==
Born in the Netherlands, Lartey Sanniez is of Ghanaian descent. Between 2010 and 2016, he was a youth international for the Netherlands and represented the country at all levels from under-15 to under-21.
