= Norbert Alblas =

Dutch professional footballer

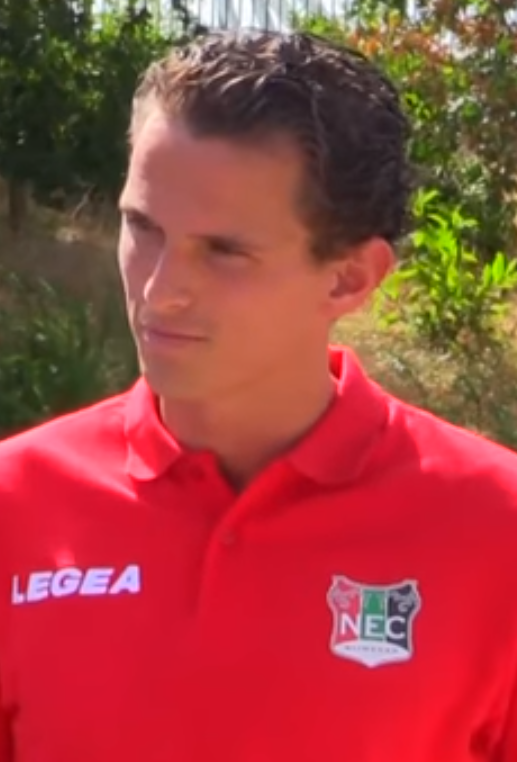
- Alblas in 2018

Personal information
- Date of birth: 12 December 1994 (age 31)
- Place of birth: Amstelveen, Netherlands
- Height: 1.85 m (6 ft 1 in)
- Position: Goalkeeper

Youth career
- –2011: AZ
- 2011–2014: Ajax

Senior career*
Years	Team	Apps	(Gls)
2014–2018	Ajax	0	(0)
2014–2018	Jong Ajax	43	(0)
2018–2021	NEC	27	(0)
2021–2022	TOP Oss	38	(0)
2022–2024	Excelsior	1	(0)
Total		109	(0)

International career
2014	Netherlands U20	1	(0)
- * Club domestic league appearances and goals

Norbert Alblas (born 12 December 1994) is a Dutch former professional footballer who played as a goalkeeper.

== Club career ==
=== Ajax ===
On 8 August 2013, Alblas signed a one-year contract with Ajax, with an option of a one-year extension. He made his professional debut for Jong Ajax in an Eerste Divisie match against Fortuna Sittard on 16 August 2014. On 27 October 2014, a day before the KNVB Cup match against SV Urk, Ajax manager Frank de Boer announced that Alblas was part of the first-team match squad. This was the first time for Alblas that he was included in the first team.

In a match against RKC Waalwijk for Jong Ajax, Alblas was forced off after having torn his anterior cruciate ligament, which meant that he was out for the rest of 2015. Despite his injury, Ajax reached an agreement with Alblas at the end of May 2015 about the extension of his contract. His contract, which ran until 30 June 2015 was extended for one season. After 14 months of injury, he made his comeback in early-February 2016 in a friendly between Jong Ajax and Ajax Amateur which ended in a 3–3 draw. His official return to the pitch came late – mainly because third goalkeeper André Onana was often preferred as the starter for Jong Ajax – on 19 August 2016. On that day, Jong Ajax played a home match against Den Bosch, where Alblas was the team captain. In January 2017 it was announced that goalkeeper Tim Krul, at that time on loan with Ajax, would leave for AZ. As a result, Alblas became third goalkeeper in the first team of Ajax. In the 2017–18 season, Alblas won the Eerste Divisie with Jong Ajax. Afterwards, his contract expired and he left the club.

=== NEC ===
On 7 August 2018, Alblas signed a contract with NEC Nijmegen for two seasons with an option for two more seasons. He made his debut for the club on 31 August in a 1–0 win at home against Dordrecht. On 28 September 2018, Alblas injured his knee in a league match in the Eerste Divisie at home against Go Ahead Eagles and was replaced by Marco van Duin. He resumed practice in January 2019 but suffered a torn cruciate ligament after a week. Alblas did not play again for NEC and when the club did not exercise the option in his contract, his contract was set to expire in mid-2020. On 16 June, he signed a new one-year contract with an option for another season. Alblas started the 2020–21 season as the first goalkeeper, in favor of Mattijs Branderhorst. In the middle of the season, Alblas became second keeper again after some errors. On 23 May 2021, Alblas won promotion with NEC to the Eredivisie, by beating NAC Breda 2–1 in the final of the play-offs.

=== TOP Oss ===
After having played three seasons for NEC, Alblas signed with TOP Oss on 25 June 2021. He made his debut on 6 August, keeping a clean sheet in a 1–0 away win over Excelsior.

=== Excelsior ===
On 31 August 2022, Alblas signed a one-season contract with recently promoted Eredivisie club Excelsior. He was assigned as backup goalkeeper to starter Stijn van Gassel for the 2022–23 season. He made his Excelsior debut on 19 October in a 5–1 victory in the KNVB Cup against MVV Maastricht.

== Career statistics ==
=== Club ===
As of match played 19 October 2022

Appearances and goals by club, season and competition
Club	Season	League			Cup		Other		Total	
Club	Season	Division	Apps	Goals	Apps	Goals	Apps	Goals	Apps	Goals
Jong Ajax	2013–14	Eerste Divisie	0	0	—		—		0	0
Jong Ajax	2014–15	Eerste Divisie	8	0	—		—		8	0
Jong Ajax	2015–16	Eerste Divisie	0	0	—		—		0	0
Jong Ajax	2016–17	Eerste Divisie	22	0	—		—		22	0
Jong Ajax	2017–18	Eerste Divisie	13	0	—		—		13	0
Jong Ajax	Total		43	0	—		—		43	0
NEC	2018–19	Eerste Divisie	5	0	1	0	—		6	0
NEC	2019–20	Eerste Divisie	0	0	0	0	—		0	0
NEC	2020–21	Eerste Divisie	22	0	0	0	0	0	22	0
NEC	Total		27	0	1	0	0	0	28	0
TOP Oss	2021–22	Eerste Divisie	35	0	1	0	—		36	0
TOP Oss	2022–23	Eerste Divisie	3	0	0	0	—		3	0
TOP Oss	Total		38	0	1	0	—		39	0
Excelsior	2022–23	Eredivisie	0	0	1	0	—		1	0
Career total			108	0	3	0	0	0	111	0

== Honours ==
Ajax

- UEFA Europa League runners-up: 2016–17

Jong Ajax

- Eerste Divisie: 2017–18
