= Jordy ter Borgh =

Dutch footballer (born 1994)

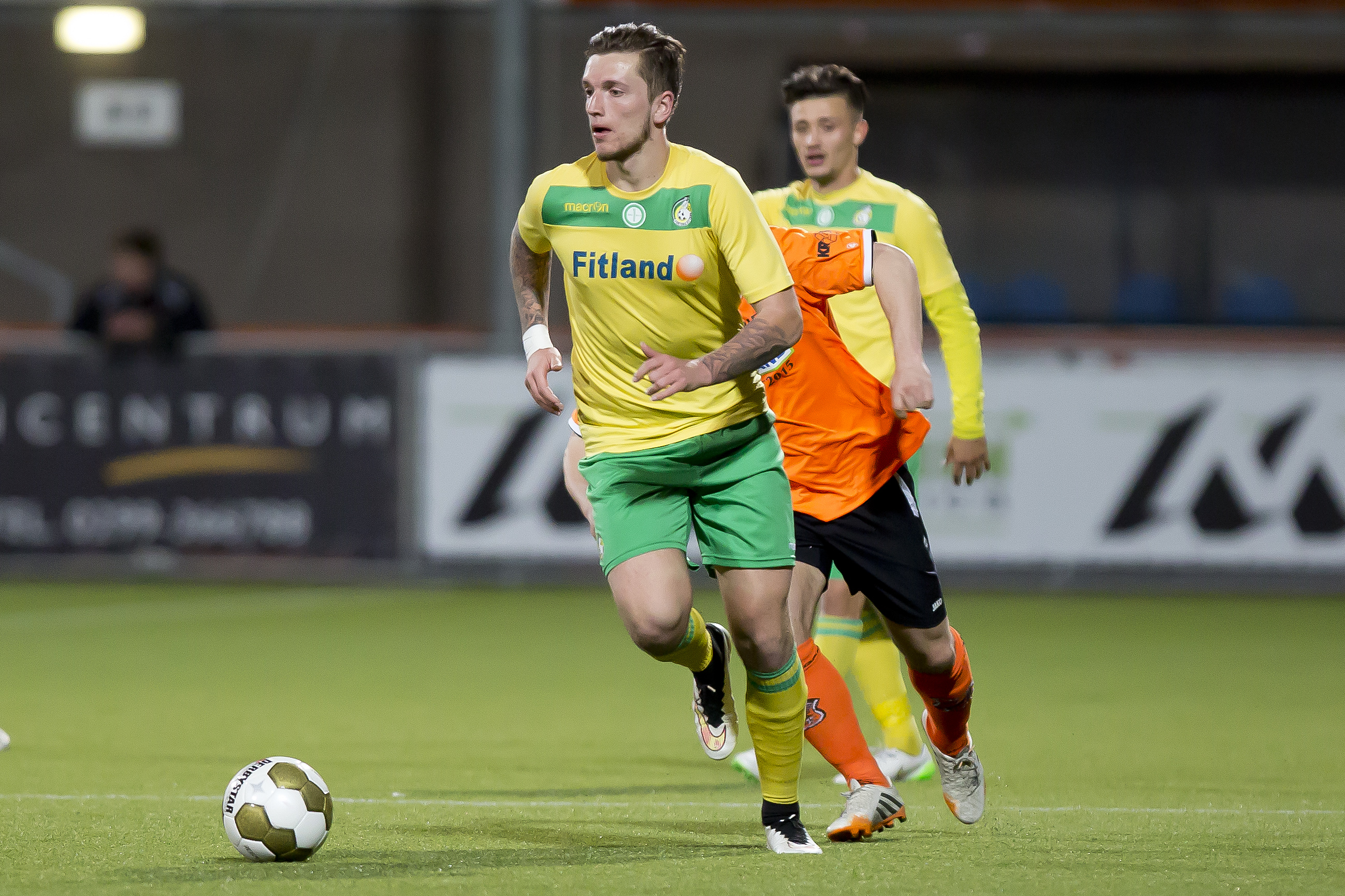

Personal information
- Full name: Jordan René ter Borgh
- Date of birth: 5 May 1994 (age 32)
- Place of birth: Amsterdam, Netherlands
- Height: 1.90 m (6 ft 3 in)
- Position: Midfielder

Youth career
- –2013: FC Omniworld / Almere City

Senior career*
Years	Team	Apps	(Gls)
2013–2014	Almere City	1	(0)
2014–2016	Fortuna Sittard	41	(1)
2016	Heerenveen	0	(0)
2016–2017	Almere City	0	(0)
2017–2020	TOP Oss	1	(0)
2019–2020	→ DOVO (loan)	6	(0)
2020–2024	DHSC		
- * Club domestic league appearances and goals

Jordy ter Borgh (born 5 May 1994 in Amsterdam) is a Dutch retired footballer who played as a midfielder.

== Club career ==
=== Early career ===
Ter Borgh began his football career in the youth ranks of his local club Omniworld. In 2010 the club was renamed Almere City FC. In 2012 ter Borgh was on trial at Ipswich Town FC, an English football club based in Ipswich, who play in the Football League Championship.

=== Almere City FC ===
Ter Borgh made his official debut in 2013/2014 for Almere City FC against FC Oss on Friday the 4 April 2014. Ter Borgh is the first Almere City FC youth player to have successfully made his first-team debut.

=== Fortuna Sittard ===
On Friday 27 June 2014, ter Borgh signed a two-year deal. Ter Borgh was acquired by Fortuna Sittard as a free transfer from Almere City FC. At the beginning of January 2016, Fortuna Sittard announced on their website that the club and ter Borgh would part.

=== TOP Oss ===
Ter Borgh joined TOP Oss in the summer of 2017. After only playing one game for two years, he was loaned out to DOVO on 23 August 2019 for the rest of the season. He was snapped up by DHSC in 2020 and later played for ASC Waterwijk.
