= Nayib Lagouireh =

Belgian footballer (born 1991)

Personal information
- Date of birth: 6 June 1991 (age 35)
- Place of birth: Heusden, Belgium
- Height: 1.71 m (5 ft 7 in)
- Position: Right winger

Team information
- Current team: Sporting Hasselt

Youth career
- Verbroedering Geel
- Feyenoord

Senior career*
Years	Team	Apps	(Gls)
2010–2012	Excelsior	36	(2)
2012–2014	FC Eindhoven	47	(11)
2014–2016	Roda JC Kerkrade	20	(2)
2016	→ Fortuna Sittard (loan)	10	(0)
2017–	Sporting Hasselt	0	(0)

International career
2007	Belgium U16	6	(1)
2007–2008	Belgium U17	13	(2)
2011	Belgium U21	2	(0)
- * Club domestic league appearances and goals as of 28 May 2016

Nayib Lagouireh (born 6 June 1991) is a Belgian footballer who plays as a right winger for Sporting Hasselt. He formerly played for Excelsior, FC Eindhoven, Roda JC Kerkrade and Fortuna Sittard.

== Career ==
Lagouireh left his Belgian youth club Verbroedering Geel to join the Feyenoord Academy in the Netherlands. After playing for Feyenoord's youth teams, he joined Eredivisie club Excelsior. Lagouireh made his professional debut for Excelsior on 7 August 2010. He replaced Tim Vincken in the 74th minute, but couldn't prevent Excelsior losing the season opening away match against De Graafschap (3–0).
