= Tom Noordhoff =

Dutch footballer (born 1995)

Personal information
- Date of birth: 19 July 1995 (age 31)
- Place of birth: Haarlem, Netherlands
- Height: 1.78 m (5 ft 10 in)
- Position: Defensive midfielder

Team information
- Current team: Quick Boys
- Number: 30

Youth career
- VV Schoten
- –2007: Stormvogels Telstar
- 2007–2013: Ajax

Senior career*
Years	Team	Apps	(Gls)
2013–2015	Jong Ajax	17	(1)
2015–2016	Telstar	7	(0)
2016–2017	Jong Almere City	27	(0)
2017–2019	OFC Oostzaan	49	(14)
2019–2023	FC Lisse	81	(5)
2023–2025	Spakenburg	61	(1)
2025–	Quick Boys	42	(3)

International career
2011	Netherlands U17	3	(0)
2013	Netherlands U18	1	(0)
- * Club domestic league appearances and goals as of 10:30, 24 October 2026 (UTC)

Tom Noordhoff (born 19 July 1995) is a Dutch footballer who plays as a defensive midfielder for Tweede Divisie club Quick Boys.

== Club career ==
=== Ajax ===
Noordhoff played youth football for VV Schoten and Stormvogels Telstar before joining Ajax' youth academy in 2007. On 11 May 2012, Noordhoff signed a three-year contract with Ajax, tying him down to the club until 30 June 2015. He made his debut for Jong Ajax in an Eerste Divisie match against Achilles '29 on 8 September 2013. He made a total of 15 appearances playing for the reserves team in the Dutch second division, while unable to break into the first team, his contract was not extended.

=== Telstar ===
On 29 April 2015 it was announced that Noordhoff would return to SC Telstar, the club he had joined Ajax from during his youth years. In April 2016, it was announced that his contract would not be extended.

=== Later career ===
Noordhoff signed with Almere City as his contract expired with Telstar, but he made no appearances for their first team during his sole season at the club.

On 11 April 2017, he signed with OFC Oostzaan competing in the Derde Divisie. There, he had ambitions of reaching the third-tier Tweede Divisie with the club.

Noordhoff signed with FC Lisse on 9 January 2019, joining the club from June 2019.

In November 2022, it was announced that Noordhoff would join Spakenburg at the start of the 2023–24 season. He was part of the team winning the Tweede Divisie in his first season the club.

=== Quick Boys ===
On 7 January 2025, Quick Boys announced Noordhoff as the club's first signing ahead of the 2025–26 season.

== Career statistics ==
As of match played 25 January 2025

Appearances and goals by club, season and competition
Club	Season	League			KNVB Cup		Other		Total	
Club	Season	Division	Apps	Goals	Apps	Goals	Apps	Goals	Apps	Goals
Jong Ajax	2013–14	Eerste Divisie	1	0	—		—		1	0
Jong Ajax	2014–15	Eerste Divisie	16	1	—		—		16	1
Jong Ajax	Total		17	1	—		—		17	1
Telstar	2015–16	Eerste Divisie	6	0	0	0	—		6	0
Jong Almere City	2016–17	Derde Divisie	27	0	—		—		27	0
OFC Oostzaan	2017–18	Derde Divisie	28	5	1	0	—		29	5
OFC Oostzaan	2018–19	Derde Divisie	21	9	1	0	2 (Note: Appearances in promotion/relegation play-offs)	0	24	9
OFC Oostzaan	Total		49	14	2	0	2	0	53	14
Lisse	2019–20	Derde Divisie	20	1	0	0	—		20	1
Lisse	2020–21	Derde Divisie	4	1	1	0	—		5	1
Lisse	2021–22	Derde Divisie	33	1	2	1	—		35	2
Lisse	2022–23	Tweede Divisie	26	2	1	0	—		27	2
Lisse	Total		83	5	4	1	—		87	6
Spakenburg	2023–24	Tweede Divisie	29	0	2	0	—		31	0
Spakenburg	2024–25	Tweede Divisie	32	1	1	0	—		33	1
Spakenburg	Total		61	1	3	0	—		64	1
Quick Boys	2025–26	Tweede Divisie	10	1	0	0	—		10	1
Career total			253	22	9	1	2	0	264	23

== Honours ==
Spakenburg

- Tweede Divisie: 2023–24
