= Danny Bakker (footballer, born 25 January 1995) =

Dutch footballer (born 1995)

Personal information
- Date of birth: 25 January 1995 (age 31)
- Place of birth: Amstelveen, Netherlands
- Height: 1.82 m (6 ft 0 in)
- Position: Midfielder

Team information
- Current team: Lisse
- Number: 7

Youth career
- –2013: Ajax

Senior career*
Years	Team	Apps	(Gls)
2013–2016	Jong Ajax	55	(3)
2016–2018	Cambuur	3	(0)
2017–2018	→ Dordrecht (loan)	21	(0)
2018–2023	VVSB	93	(24)
2023–2024	Katwijk	25	(2)
2024–	Lisse	32	(9)
- * Club domestic league appearances and goals as of 16:22, 28 May 2026 (UTC)

Danny Bakker (born 25 January 1995) is a Dutch footballer who plays as a midfielder for Lisse.

== Club career ==
Bakker is a graduate of Ajax's youth academy. On 11 August 2014, he made his professional debut for Jong Ajax in an Eerste Divisie match against Telstar, replacing Lerin Duarte on 80 minutes. In 2017 he was loaned by Cambuur to Dordrecht.

He joined Lisse in 2024 and extended his stay at the club in 2025.
