= Lerin Duarte =

Dutch footballer (born 1990)

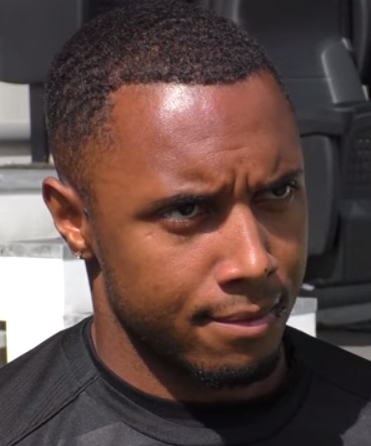
- Duarte in 2018

Personal information
- Full name: Lerin Duarte
- Date of birth: 11 August 1990 (age 36)
- Place of birth: Rotterdam, Netherlands
- Height: 1.69 m (5 ft 7 in)
- Position: Midfielder

Youth career
- –2009: Sparta

Senior career*
Years	Team	Apps	(Gls)
2009–2011	Sparta	42	(6)
2011–2013	Heracles	66	(12)
2013–2016	Ajax	18	(3)
2013–2016	Jong Ajax	11	(0)
2015	→ Heerenveen (loan)	8	(1)
2016	→ NAC (loan)	8	(0)
2016–2019	Heracles	61	(7)
2019–2022	Aris	3	(0)
2023	ASWH	0	(0)
2023	Noordwijk	0	(0)

International career
2005	Netherlands U16	2	(0)
2011–2013	Netherlands U21	10	(1)
- * Club domestic league appearances and goals as of 11 March 2023

Lerin Duarte (born 11 August 1990) is a Dutch former professional footballer who played as a midfielder.

Having come through the youth department of Sparta Rotterdam, he started his senior career at the club, before transferring to Heracles Almelo. He spent two seasons there, before moving to Eredivisie champions Ajax in 2013. Following two loans to SC Heerenveen and NAC Breda, he returned to Heracles Almelo in summer 2016.

== Club career ==
=== Sparta and Heracles ===
Born in Rotterdam, Duarte started in the youth department of Sparta Rotterdam. He continued through the youth academy and made his first senior appearance for the club in the Eredivisie on 1 August 2009, in a 0–2 home defeat to FC Twente. He continued to play in the first team in the 2009–2010 season and finished with 9 appearances. At the end of the season Sparta was relegated to the Eerste Divisie. After playing the following 2010–11 season with the club he joined Heracles Almelo, thereby returning to the Eredivisie.

Duarte agreed a three-year contract, with the option of an extra year, with Eredivisie club Heracles Almelo after passing a medical on 15 June 2011. He made his league debut for the club on 6 August 2011 against RKC Waalwijk coming on as a substitute in the 60th minute.

=== Ajax ===
On 31 August 2013, at the end of the Eredivisie match between Heracles Almelo and ADO Den Haag, it was announced by Jan Smit that Ajax and Heracles Almelo had agreed to terms for the direct transfer of Duarte to the capital city. Duarte joined the Amsterdammers for the sum of €2.5 million from Almelo, signing a four-year contract binding him to his new club until 2017. He was given the number 8 shirt previously worn by Christian Eriksen upon his arrival. Duarte made his debut for Ajax on 14 September 2013 in a 2–1 at home against PEC Zwolle. He made his continental debut at Camp Nou in a 4–0 loss against FC Barcelona, playing the full 90 minutes of the 2013–14 UEFA Champions League Group stage match. On 28 September Duarte scored his first goal for Ajax, in a 6–0 victory at home against Go Ahead Eagles, scoring the fifth goal in the 64th minute of the game.

=== Heerenveen, NAC and Heracles ===
After the move of Daley Sinkgraven to Ajax, Duarte was sent on loan to SC Heerenveen for the rest of the 2014–2015 season In January 2015.

Following his release by Ajax, free agent Duarte returned to former club Heracles Almelo, agreeing a three-year contract with the club.

=== Aris, ASWH and Noordwijk ===
On 2 June 2019, Duarte agreed to join Aris on a three-year contract. On 1 July 2020 in an away match against Panathinaikos, he suffered a serious knee injury.

At the end of January 2023, Duarte signed with the Derde Divisie-side ASWH from Hendrik-Ido-Ambacht. After a lot of training and having sat just one game on the ASWH bench during an official game, he left ASWH. At the beginning of the subsequent season, Duarte joined Tweede Divisie-side VV Noordwijk. He left after not getting playing time, noting the inconvenience of training in the evenings.

== International career ==
Duarte was born in the Netherlands and has Cape Verdean origin, therefore, he is eligible by the Netherlands and Cape Verde. He has represented the Netherlands 10 times at Under-21 level having been called up on 4 September 2011 for the game against Luxembourg in the UEFA Under 21 Championship. Duarte went on to start on the bench before being substituted on in the 76th minute to make his international debut, the game ended in a 4–0 win for the Netherlands.

In May 2013, Duarte was called up for the Dutch senior team for two friendlies, against China and Indonesia, however he stayed on the bench for both matches as an unused substitute.

== Personal life ==
Despite his last name, place of birth and country of descent; Duarte is not related to fellow footballers Laros Duarte and Deroy Duarte.

== Career statistics ==
As of match played 1 July 2020

Appearances and goals by club, season and competition
Club	Season	League			Cup		Continental		Other		Total	
Club	Season	Division	Apps	Goals	Apps	Goals	Apps	Goals	Apps	Goals	Apps	Goals
Sparta Rotterdam	2009–10	Eredivisie	9	0	3	1	—		4	0	16	1
Sparta Rotterdam	2010–11	Eerste Divisie	33	6	1	0	—		—		34	6
Sparta Rotterdam	Total		42	6	4	1	0	0	4	0	50	7
Heracles Almelo	2011–12	Eredivisie	31	4	6	0	—		—		37	4
Heracles Almelo	2012–13	Eredivisie	30	6	4	0	—		—		34	6
Heracles Almelo	2013–14	Eredivisie	5	2	0	0	—		—		5	2
Heracles Almelo	Total		66	12	10	0	0	0	0	0	76	12
Ajax	2013–14	Eredivisie	14	3	3	0	5	0	0	0	22	3
Ajax	2014–15	Eredivisie	4	0	0	0	0	0	0	0	4	0
Ajax	Total		18	3	3	0	5	0	0	0	26	3
Jong Ajax	2013–14	Eerste Divisie	3	0	—		—		—		3	0
Jong Ajax	2014–15	Eerste Divisie	8	0	—		—		—		8	0
Jong Ajax	Total		11	0	—		—		—		11	0
SC Heerenveen (loan)	2014–15	Eredivisie	8	1	0	0	0	0	0	0	8	1
NAC (loan)	2015–16	Eerste Divisie	8	0	0	0	—		4	0	12	0
Heracles Almelo	2016–17	Eredivisie	18	1	3	0	0	0	—		21	1
Heracles Almelo	2017–18	Eredivisie	14	0	1	0	0	0	—		15	0
Heracles Almelo	2018–19	Eredivisie	29	6	1	0	—		—		29	6
Heracles Almelo	Total		61	7	5	0	0	0	0	0	66	7
Aris	2019–20	Super League Greece	3	0	0	0	0	0	—		3	0
Aris	2020–21	Super League Greece	0	0	0	0	—		—		0	0
Aris	2021–22	Super League Greece	0	0	0	0	—		—		0	0
Aris	Total		3	0	0	0	0	0	—		3	0
Career total			217	29	22	1	5	0	8	0	252	29

== Honours ==
=== Club ===
Ajax

- Eredivisie: 2013–14
- Eusébio Cup: 2014
