= 2016–17 AFC Ajax season =

Dutch football club season

Ajax
2016–17 season
- Chairman: Hennie Henrichs
- Manager: Peter Bosz
- Eredivisie: 2nd
- KNVB Cup: Third round
- Champions League: Play-off round
- Europa League: Runners-up
- Top goalscorer: League: Kasper Dolberg (16); All: Kasper Dolberg (22)
- Highest home attendance: 51,998 vs PSV (18 December 2016)
- Lowest home attendance: 45,405 vs Willem II (20 August 2016)
| Home colours | Away colours | Third colours |

During the 2016–17 season, AFC Ajax participated in the Eredivisie, the KNVB Cup, the UEFA Champions League and the UEFA Europa League.The first training took place on 25 June 2016. The traditional AFC Ajax Open Day was held on 29 July 2016.

== Player statistics ==
Appearances for competitive matches only

| No. | Pos | Nat | Player | Total | | Eredivisie | | UEFA Champions League UEFA Europa League | | KNVB Cup | |
| No. | Pos | Nat | Player | Apps | Goals | Apps | Goals | Apps | Goals | Apps | Goals |
|---|---|---|---|---|---|---|---|---|---|---|---|
| 2 | DF | (Netherlands) NED | Kenny Tete | 19 | 1 | 5 | 0 | 8+3 | 1 | 3 | 0 |
| 3 | DF | (Netherlands) NED | Joël Veltman | 44 | 0 | 30 | 0 | 14 | 0 | 0 | 0 |
| 4 | DF | (Netherlands) NED | Jaïro Riedewald | 28 | 1 | 11+5 | 0 | 10+1 | 1 | 1 | 0 |
| 5 | DF | (Colombia) COL | Davinson Sánchez | 45 | 6 | 32 | 6 | 13 | 0 | 0 | 0 |
| 7 | FW | (Brazil) BRA | David Neres | 12 | 3 | 5+3 | 3 | 0+4 | 0 | 0 | 0 |
| 8 | MF | (Netherlands) NED | Daley Sinkgraven | 32 | 1 | 21+3 | 1 | 6+1 | 0 | 1 | 0 |
| 9 | FW | (Burkina Faso) BFA | Bertrand Traoré | 39 | 13 | 22+2 | 9 | 15 | 4 | 0 | 0 |
| 10 | MF | (Netherlands) NED | Davy Klaassen | 50 | 16 | 33 | 14 | 17 | 2 | 0 | 0 |
| 11 | FW | (Germany) GER | Amin Younes | 47 | 8 | 28+1 | 3 | 17 | 5 | 0+1 | 0 |
| 16 | DF | (Germany) GER | Heiko Westermann | 8 | 0 | 1+3 | 0 | 2+1 | 0 | 1 | 0 |
| 17 | FW | (Czech Republic) CZE | Václav Černý | 10 | 1 | 2+3 | 0 | 1+1 | 0 | 2+1 | 1 |
| 19 | FW | (Colombia) COL | Mateo Cassierra | 29 | 4 | 1+16 | 2 | 4+5 | 0 | 3 | 2 |
| 20 | FW | (Denmark) DEN | Lasse Schöne | 43 | 9 | 26+1 | 7 | 11+3 | 1 | 1+1 | 1 |
| 21 | MF | (Netherlands) NED | Frenkie de Jong | 11 | 1 | 1+3 | 1 | 0+4 | 0 | 1+2 | 0 |
| 22 | MF | (Morocco) MAR | Hakim Ziyech | 42 | 10 | 28 | 7 | 11+2 | 2 | 1 | 1 |
| 24 | GK | (Cameroon) CMR | André Onana | 46 | 0 | 32 | 0 | 14 | 0 | 0 | 0 |
| 25 | FW | (Denmark) DEN | Kasper Dolberg | 48 | 22 | 26+3 | 16 | 12+5 | 6 | 1+1 | 0 |
| 26 | DF | (Netherlands) NED | Nick Viergever | 43 | 2 | 27+2 | 2 | 13 | 0 | 1 | 0 |
| 30 | MF | (Netherlands) NED | Donny van de Beek | 31 | 0 | 4+15 | 0 | 5+5 | 0 | 2 | 0 |
| 33 | GK | (Netherlands) NED | Diederik Boer | 4 | 0 | 0 | 0 | 1 | 0 | 3 | 0 |
| 34 | MF | (Netherlands) NED | Abdelhak Nouri | 15 | 1 | 1+8 | 0 | 2+1 | 0 | 2+1 | 1 |
| 36 | DF | (Netherlands) NED | Matthijs de Ligt | 23 | 3 | 6+5 | 2 | 8+1 | 0 | 3 | 1 |
| 40 | DF | (Netherlands) NED | Carel Eiting | 1 | 0 | 0 | 0 | 0 | 0 | 0+1 | 0 |
| 42 | DF | (Netherlands) NED | Deyovaisio Zeefuik | 1 | 0 | 0+1 | 0 | 0 | 0 | 0 | 0 |
| 43 (48) | GK | (Netherlands) NED | Norbert Alblas | 0 | 0 | 0 | 0 | 0 | 0 | 0 | 0 |
| 44 | FW | (Netherlands) NED | Pelle Clement | 4 | 3 | 0+1 | 0 | 0+1 | 0 | 1+1 | 3 |
| 45 | FW | (Netherlands) NED | Justin Kluivert | 20 | 2 | 7+7 | 2 | 2+4 | 0 | 0 | 0 |
Players sold or loaned out after the start of the season:
| 1 | GK | (Netherlands) NED | Jasper Cillessen | 6 | 0 | 2 | 0 | 4 | 0 | 0 | 0 |
| 1 | GK | (Netherlands) NED | Tim Krul | 0 | 0 | 0 | 0 | 0 | 0 | 0 | 0 |
| 6 | MF | (Netherlands) NED | Riechedly Bazoer | 10 | 1 | 3+2 | 0 | 2+1 | 0 | 2 | 1 |
| 7 | FW | (Netherlands) NED | Anwar El Ghazi | 20 | 2 | 7+5 | 0 | 4+2 | 1 | 2 | 1 |
| 27 | MF | (Serbia) SRB | Nemanja Gudelj | 13 | 2 | 5+1 | 2 | 7 | 0 | 0 | 0 |
| 35 | DF | (Netherlands) NED | Mitchell Dijks | 20 | 0 | 8+4 | 0 | 6 | 0 | 2 | 0 |

As of 24 May 2017

== Team statistics ==
=== 2016–17 Eredivisie standings ===
| Current standing | Matches played | Wins | Draws | Losses | Points | Goals for | Goals against | Yellow cards (yellow card) | Red cards (red card) |
|---|---|---|---|---|---|---|---|---|---|
| 2 | 34 | 25 | 6 | 3 | 81 | 79 | 23 | 40 | 2 |

==== Points by match day ====
| Match day | 1 | 2 | 3 | 4 | 5 | 6 | 7 | 8 | 9 | 10 | 11 | 12 | 13 | 14 | 15 | 16 | 17 | 18 | 19 | 20 | 21 | 22 | 23 | 24 | 25 | 26 | 27 | 28 | 29 | 30 | 31 | 32 | 33 | 34 | Total |
|---|---|---|---|---|---|---|---|---|---|---|---|---|---|---|---|---|---|---|---|---|---|---|---|---|---|---|---|---|---|---|---|---|---|---|---|
| Points | 3 | 1 | 0 | 3 | 3 | 3 | 3 | 3 | 3 | 1 | 3 | 1 | 3 | 3 | 3 | 0 | 1 | 3 | 3 | 3 | 3 | 3 | 3 | 3 | 1 | 3 | 1 | 3 | 3 | 3 | 3 | 0 | 3 | 3 | 81 |

==== Total points by match day ====
| Match day | 1 | 2 | 3 | 4 | 5 | 6 | 7 | 8 | 9 | 10 | 11 | 12 | 13 | 14 | 15 | 16 | 17 | 18 | 19 | 20 | 21 | 22 | 23 | 24 | 25 | 26 | 27 | 28 | 29 | 30 | 31 | 32 | 33 | 34 | Total |
|---|---|---|---|---|---|---|---|---|---|---|---|---|---|---|---|---|---|---|---|---|---|---|---|---|---|---|---|---|---|---|---|---|---|---|---|
| Points | 3 | 4 | 4 | 7 | 10 | 13 | 16 | 19 | 22 | 23 | 26 | 27 | 30 | 33 | 36 | 36 | 37 | 40 | 43 | 46 | 49 | 52 | 55 | 58 | 59 | 62 | 63 | 66 | 69 | 72 | 75 | 75 | 78 | 81 | 81 |

==== Standing by match day ====
| Match day | 1 | 2 | 3 | 4 | 5 | 6 | 7 | 8 | 9 | 10 | 11 | 12 | 13 | 14 | 15 | 16 | 17 | 18 | 19 | 20 | 21 | 22 | 23 | 24 | 25 | 26 | 27 | 28 | 29 | 30 | 31 | 32 | 33 | 34 | Standing |
|---|---|---|---|---|---|---|---|---|---|---|---|---|---|---|---|---|---|---|---|---|---|---|---|---|---|---|---|---|---|---|---|---|---|---|---|
| Standing | 4 | 5 | 8 | 4 | 3 | 3 | 2 | 2 | 2 | 2 | 2 | 2 | 2 | 2 | 2 | 2 | 2 | 2 | 2 | 2 | 2 | 2 | 2 | 2 | 2 | 2 | 2 | 2 | 2 | 2 | 2 | 2 | 2 | 2 | 2 |

==== Goals by match day ====
| Match day | 1 | 2 | 3 | 4 | 5 | 6 | 7 | 8 | 9 | 10 | 11 | 12 | 13 | 14 | 15 | 16 | 17 | 18 | 19 | 20 | 21 | 22 | 23 | 24 | 25 | 26 | 27 | 28 | 29 | 30 | 31 | 32 | 33 | 34 | Total |
|---|---|---|---|---|---|---|---|---|---|---|---|---|---|---|---|---|---|---|---|---|---|---|---|---|---|---|---|---|---|---|---|---|---|---|---|
| Goals | 3 | 2 | 1 | 3 | 1 | 2 | 5 | 3 | 2 | 1 | 1 | 2 | 5 | 1 | 2 | 0 | 1 | 3 | 1 | 3 | 2 | 2 | 1 | 4 | 1 | 3 | 1 | 2 | 4 | 5 | 5 | 0 | 4 | 3 | 79 |

==== Topscorers ====
Eredivisie

| Nr. | Name | Goal |
|---|---|---|
| 1. | (Denmark) Kasper Dolberg | 16 |
| 2. | (Netherlands) Davy Klaassen | 14 |
| 3. | (Burkina Faso) Bertrand Traoré | 9 |
| 4. | (Denmark) Lasse Schöne | 7 |
| 4. | (Morocco) Hakim Ziyech | 7 |
| 6. | (Colombia) Davinson Sánchez | 6 |
| 7. | (Brazil) David Neres | 3 |
| 7. | (Germany) Amin Younes | 3 |
| 9. | (Colombia) Mateo Cassierra | 2 |
| 9. | (Netherlands) Matthijs de Ligt | 2 |
| 9. | (Serbia) Nemanja Gudelj | 2 |
| 9. | (Netherlands) Justin Kluivert | 2 |
| 9. | (Netherlands) Nick Viergever | 2 |
| 14. | (Netherlands) Frenkie de Jong | 1 |
| 14. | (Netherlands) Daley Sinkgraven | 1 |
| Own goal | (Denmark) Kevin Conboy (Utrecht) | 1 |
| Own goal | (Poland) Wojciech Golla (NEC) | 1 |
| | Total | 79 |

KNVB Cup

| Nr. | Name | Goal |
|---|---|---|
| 1. | (Netherlands) Pelle Clement | 3 |
| 2. | (Colombia) Mateo Cassierra | 2 |
| 3. | (Netherlands) Riechedly Bazoer | 1 |
| 3. | (Czech Republic) Václav Černý | 1 |
| 3. | (Netherlands) Matthijs de Ligt | 1 |
| 3. | (Netherlands) Anwar El Ghazi | 1 |
| 3. | (Netherlands) Abdelhak Nouri | 1 |
| 3. | (Denmark) Lasse Schöne | 1 |
| 3. | (Morocco) Hakim Ziyech | 1 |
| | Total | 12 |

UEFA Champions League

| Nr. | Name | Goal |
|---|---|---|
| 1. | (Netherlands) Davy Klaassen | 4 |
| 2. | (Denmark) Kasper Dolberg | 1 |
| | Total | 5 |

UEFA Europa League

| Nr. | Name | Goal |
|---|---|---|
| 1. | (Denmark) Kasper Dolberg | 6 |
| 2. | (Burkina Faso) Bertrand Traoré | 4 |
| 2. | (Germany) Amin Younes | 4 |
| 4. | (Netherlands) Davy Klaassen | 2 |
| 4. | (Netherlands) Nick Viergever | 2 |
| 4. | (Morocco) Hakim Ziyech | 2 |
| 4. | (Netherlands) Anwar El Ghazi | 1 |
| 4. | (Netherlands) Jaïro Riedewald | 1 |
| 4. | (Denmark) Lasse Schöne | 1 |
| 4. | (Netherlands) Kenny Tete | 1 |
| | Total | 24 |

== Placements ==
| | Friendlies | KNVB Cup | UEFA Champions League | UEFA Europa League | Eredivisie |
|---|---|---|---|---|---|
| Status | 7 played, 2 wins, 2 draws, 3 losses | Third Round; Last opponent: SC Cambuur | Play-off round Last opponent: FC Rostov | Final; Last opponent: Manchester United | 34 played, 25 wins, 6 draws, 3 loss 2nd |

- Davinson Sánchez was voted Player of the year by the supporters of AFC Ajax.
- Kasper Dolberg was voted Talent of the year by the supporters of AFC Ajax.
- Peter Bosz was nominated for the Rinus Michels Award 2017 in the category: Best Trainer/Coach in Professional Football.
- Kasper Dolberg was voted Danish Talent of the Year: 2017 by the Danish Football Association.
- Matthijs de Ligt, Bertrand Traoré and Amin Younes were selected for the 2017 UEFA Europa League squad of the season by the UEFA Technical Observers.

== Competitions ==
All times are in CEST

=== Eredivisie ===
==== League table ====
| Pos | Team | Pld | W | D | L | GF | GA | GD | Pts | Qualification or relegation |
|---|---|---|---|---|---|---|---|---|---|---|
| 1 | Feyenoord (C) | 34 | 26 | 4 | 4 | 86 | 25 | +61 | 82 | Qualification for the Champions League group stage |
| 2 | Ajax | 34 | 25 | 6 | 3 | 79 | 23 | +56 | 81 | Qualification for the Champions League third qualifying round |
| 3 | PSV Eindhoven | 34 | 22 | 10 | 2 | 68 | 23 | +45 | 76 | Qualification for the Europa League third qualifying round |
| 4 | Utrecht (O) | 34 | 18 | 8 | 8 | 54 | 38 | +16 | 62 | Qualification for the European competition play-offs (Note: Four teams played for a spot in the Europa League second qualifying round.) |
| 5 | Vitesse | 34 | 15 | 6 | 13 | 51 | 40 | +11 | 51 | Qualification for the Europa League group stage (Note: Vitesse qualified for the Europa League group stage by winning the 2016–17 KNVB Cup.) |

Source: NUsport (in Dutch), Soccerway
Rules for classification: 1) Points; 2) Goal difference; 3) Goals scored; 4) Play-off (only for deciding champion and relegation); 5) Head-to-head points; 6) Head-to-head goal difference; 7) Head-to-head away goals scored; 8) Draw. (Note: Criteria 5-8 is only used if deciding Europa League play-off places)
(C) Champions; (O) Play-off winners

==== Matches ====
| 7 August 2016 1 | Sparta Rotterdam | 1–3 | Ajax | Rotterdam |
| 14:30 CEST | Sanusi 8', (yellow card) 86'; Pinteaux (yellow card) 50'; Dumfries (yellow card) 76' | Report | Klaassen 5', (yellow card) 90+3'; Dijks (yellow card) 11'; Sinkgraven 54'; Cassierra 68'; Veltman (yellow card) 17' (yellow-red card) 84'; Westermann (yellow card) 90' | Stadium: Het Kasteel; Attendance: 10,599; Referee: Kevin Blom |

| 13 August 2016 2 | Ajax | 2–2 | Roda JC | Amsterdam |
| 19:45 CEST | Dolberg 8', 44'; Riedewald (yellow card) 90'; Klaassen (yellow card) 90' | Report | Auassar 17'; Gullón (yellow card) 26'; Van Hyfte 90+1'; Ananou (yellow card) 49' (yellow-red card) 90+4' | Stadium: Amsterdam Arena; Attendance: 48,343; Referee: Bas Nijhuis |

| 20 August 2016 3 | Ajax | 1–2 | Willem II | Amsterdam |
| 19:45 CEST | Klaassen 1' | Report | Falkenburg 28'; Sol 31'; Peters (yellow card) 40'; Lachman (yellow card) 62'; Van den Boomen (yellow card) 66' | Stadium: Amsterdam Arena; Attendance: 45,405; Referee: Dennis Higler |

| 28 August 2016 4 | Go Ahead Eagles | 0–3 | Ajax | Deventer |
| 14:30 CEST | Ritzmaier (yellow card) 37'; Maatsen (yellow card) 43' | Report | Sánchez (yellow card) 20'; Klaassen 24', 35' (pen.); Dolberg (yellow card) 25'; Veltman (yellow card) 44'; Onana (yellow card) 45'; Traoré (yellow card) 59'; Gudelj 62' | Stadium: De Adelaarshorst; Attendance: 9,756; Referee: Pol van Boekel |

| 11 September 2016 5 | Ajax | 1–0 | Vitesse | Amsterdam |
| 16:45 CEST | Viergever (yellow card) 27', (goal) 55' | Report | Kruiswijk (yellow card) 44' (yellow-red card) 67' | Stadium: Amsterdam Arena; Attendance: 47,168; Referee: Richard Liesveld |

| 18 September 2016 6 | Heracles | 0–2 | Ajax | Almelo |
| 16:45 CEST | Van Ooijen (yellow card) 79' | Report | Klaassen 66'; Gudelj 76' | Stadium: Polman Stadion; Attendance: 12,032; Referee: Serdar Gözübüyük |

| 24 September 2016 7 | Ajax | 5–1 | PEC Zwolle | Amsterdam |
| 19:45 CEST | Sánchez 8', 38'; Dolberg 55', 64'; Traoré 59' | Report | Brama 4'; Holla (yellow card) 15'; Van Polen (yellow card) 17'; Verdonk (yellow card) 83' | Stadium: Amsterdam Arena; Attendance: 48,088; Referee: Jochem Kamphuis |

| 2 October 2016 8 | Ajax | 3–2 | Utrecht | Amsterdam |
| 12:30 CEST | Klaassen (yellow card) 34'; Leeuwin 47' (o.g.); Schöne 79' (pen.); Ziyech 87' | Report | Conboy 27', (yellow card) 40'; Janssen (yellow card) 37'; Ayoub (yellow card) 51'; Amrabat (yellow card) 69'; Barazite (yellow card) 71'; Haller (yellow card) 75'; Strieder (yellow card) 78'; Van der Maarel 90' | Stadium: Amsterdam Arena; Attendance: 47,243; Referee: Bas Nijhuis |

| 16 October 2016 9 | ADO Den Haag | 0–2 | Ajax | The Hague |
| 16:45 CEST | Jansen (yellow card) 33' | Report | Klaassen 20'; Traoré 52' | Stadium: Kyocera Stadion; Attendance: 13,764; Referee: Kevin Blom |

| 23 October 2016 10 | Feyenoord | 1–1 | Ajax | Rotterdam |
| 14:30 CEST | El Ahmadi (yellow card) 66'; Van der Heijden (yellow card) 78'; Kuyt 85' | Report | Dolberg 55'; Traoré (yellow card) 56'; Veltman (yellow card) 61'; Klaassen (yellow card) 63' | Stadium: De Kuip; Attendance: 47,500; Referee: Björn Kuipers |

| 29 October 2016 11 | Ajax | 1–0 | Excelsior | Amsterdam |
| 20:45 CEST | Ziyech 48'; Schöne (yellow card) 79' | report | Drost (yellow card) 90+1' | Stadium: Amsterdam Arena; Attendance: 47,460; Referee: Danny Makkelie |

| 6 November 2016 12 | AZ | 2–2 | Ajax | Alkmaar |
| 14:30 CEST | Weghorst 13', 79'; Johansson (yellow card) 29'; Rienstra (yellow card) 35'; Luckassen (yellow card) 40' | report | Veltman (yellow card) 45+2'; Sánchez (yellow card) 45+2'; Traoré 47'; Klaassen 62' | Stadium: AFAS Stadion; Attendance: 16,647; Referee: Pol van Boekel |

| 20 November 2016 13 | Ajax | 5–0 | NEC | Amsterdam |
| 14:30 CEST | Dolberg 19', 24', 37'; Traoré 55'; Schöne 57' | report | Von Haacke (yellow card) 37'; Golla (yellow card) 39'; Dyrestam (yellow card) 52' | Stadium: Amsterdam Arena; Attendance: 49,521; Referee: Bas Nijhuis |

| 27 November 2016 14 | Heerenveen | 0–1 | Ajax | Heerenveen |
| 14:30 CEST | Larsson (yellow card) 84'; Van Aken (yellow card) 87' | report | Sinkgraven (yellow card) 22'; Klaassen 71', (yellow card) 83'; Younes (yellow card) 80' | Stadium: Abe Lenstra Stadion; Attendance: 24,500; Referee: Danny Makkelie |

| 4 December 2016 15 | Ajax | 2–0 | Groningen | Amsterdam |
| 16:45 CEST | Sánchez 9'; Sinkgraven (yellow card) 51'; Ziyech 72' (pen.) | report | Bacuna (yellow card) 30'; Rusnák (yellow card) 72'; Reijnen (yellow card) 80' | Stadium: Amsterdam Arena; Attendance: 50,667; Referee: Serdar Gözübüyük |

| 11 December 2016 16 | Twente | 1–0 | Ajax | Enschede |
| 16:45 CEST | Ter Avest (yellow card) 20'; Thesker (yellow card) 68'; Klich (yellow card) 82', (goal) 90+2' (pen.); Ede (yellow card) 89' | report | Dijks (yellow card) 86'; Viergever (yellow card) 80' (yellow-red card) 90+1'; Schöne (yellow card) 90+4' | Stadium: De Grolsch Veste; Attendance: 27,800; Referee: Dennis Higler |

| 18 December 2016 17 | Ajax | 1–1 | PSV | Amsterdam |
| 16:45 CEST | Klaassen 48'; Ziyech (yellow card) 73'; Younres (yellow card) 86' | report | Willems (yellow card) 37'; S. de Jong 80' | Stadium: Amsterdam Arena; Attendance: 51,998; Referee: Pol van Boekel |

| 15 January 2017 18 | PEC Zwolle | 1–3 | Ajax | Zwolle |
| 14:30 CEST | Kvída (yellow card) 32'; Ehizibue (yellow card) 45+1'; Sndler (yellow card) 53'; Brock-Madsen 72' | report | Schöne 54' (pen.); Ziyech 55', 80'; Sinkgraven (yellow card) 66' | Stadium: MAC³PARK Stadion; Attendance: 13,250; Referee: Dennis Higler |

| 22 January 2017 19 | Utrecht | 0–1 | Ajax | Utrecht |
| 12:30 CEST | Janssen (yellow card) 73' | report | Ziyech (yellow card) 49'; Schöne (yellow card) 79', (goal) 83'; Kluivert (yellow card) 90+2' | Stadium: Stadion Galgenwaard; Attendance: 21,009; Referee: Bas Kuipers |

| 29 January 2017 20 | Ajax | 3–0 | ADO Den Haag | Amsterdam |
| 14:30 CEST | Ziyech 11'; Schöne 34'; Dolberg 76' | report | Beugelsdijk (yellow card) 64'; Šetkus (yellow card) 83' | Stadium: Amsterdam Arena; Attendance: 49,552; Referee: Bas Nijhuis |

| 5 February 2017 21 | Roda JC | 0–2 | Ajax | Kerkrade |
| 12:30 CEST | | Report | Klassen 53', (yellow card) 82'; Younes 90+3' | Stadium: Parkstad Limburg Stadion; Attendance: 17,112; Referee: Danny Makkelie |

| 12 February 2017 22 | Ajax | 2–0 | Sparta | Amsterdam |
| 14:30 CEST | Traoré 45'; Dolberg 49' | Report | Mendes da Silva (yellow card) 23'; Breuer (yellow card) 35'; Dumfries (yellow card) 61' | Stadium: Amsterdam Arena; Attendance: 51,075; Referee: Pol van Boekel |

| 19 February 2017 23 | Vitesse | 0–1 | Ajax | Arnhem |
| 14:30 CEST | Diks (yellow card) 54'; Miazga (yellow card) 88' | Report | Klassen 26'; Viergever (yellow card) 36'; Kluivert (yellow card) 67' | Stadium: GelreDome; Attendance: 20,016; Referee: Kevin Blom |

| 26 February 2017 24 | Ajax | 4–1 | Heracles | Amsterdam |
| 16:45 CEST | Dolberg 23'; Onana (yellow card) 54'; De Ligt 56'; Sánchez 60'; Traoré 90' | Report | Armenteros 25', (yellow card) 54'; Pelupessy (yellow card) 40' | Stadium: Amsterdam ArenA; Attendance: 49,544; Referee: Serdar Gözübüyük |

| 5 March 2017 25 | Groningen | 1–1 | Ajax | Groningen |
| 14:30 CEST | Linssen 56'; Memišević (red card) 87' | Report | Klassen 82'; Veltman (yellow card) 86'; Younes (yellow card) 90+6' | Stadium: Euroborg; Attendance: 22,312; Referee: Bas Nijhuis |

| 12 March 2017 26 | Ajax | 3–0 | Twente | Amsterdam |
| 16:45 CEST | Younes 55'; Dolberg 67', 90+1' | Report | Klich (yellow card) 52' | Stadium: Amsterdam Arena; Attendance: 51,583; Referee: Danny Makkelie |

| 19 March 2017 27 | Excelsior | 1–1 | Ajax | Rotterdam |
| 14:30 CEST | Tete 26' (o.g.); Van Duinen (yellow card) 37'; Koolwijk (yellow card) 80'; Fredy (yellow card) 90+2' | Report | Kluivert 32'; Traoré (yellow card) 67'; Viergever (yellow card) 87' | Stadium: Stadion Woudestein; Attendance: 4,400; Referee: Pol van Boekel |

| 2 April 2017 28 | Ajax | 2–1 | Feyenoord | Amsterdam |
| 14:30 CEST | Schöne 1'; Veltman (yellow card) 36'; Neres 36' | Report | El Ahmadi (yellow card) 18'; Berghuis (yellow card) 31'; Tapia (yellow card) 52'; Van der Heijden (yellow card) 74'; Kramer 90+1' | Stadium: Amsterdam Arena; Attendance: 51,181; Referee: Björn Kuipers |

| 5 April 2017 29 | Ajax | 4–1 | AZ | Amsterdam |
| 20:45 CEST | Traoré 16'; Sánchez 72'; Schöne 83' (pen.); Younes 88' | Report | Harps (yellow card) 43'; Weghorst 55'; Van Overeem (yellow card) 60' | Stadium: Amsterdam Arena; Attendance: 51,959; Referee: Dennis Higler |

| 8 April 2017 30 | NEC | 1–5 | Ajax | Nijmegen |
| 19:45 CEST | Kadioglu 54' | Report | Golla 4' (o.g.); Neres 8'; Traoré 32', 60'; Van de Beek (yellow card) 72'; Ziyech 78' | Stadium: Stadion de Goffert; Attendance: 12,500; Referee: Bas Nijhuis |

| 16 April 2017 31 | Ajax | 5–1 | Heerenveen | Amsterdam |
| 16:45 CEST | Viergever 24'; De Ligt 32'; Klaassen 42'; Dolberg 68' (pen.); Neres (yellow card) 64', (goal) 83' | Report | Ghoochannejhad 8'; Thorsby (yellow card) 67' | Stadium: Amsterdam Arena; Attendance: 51,541; Referee: Danny Makkelie |

| 23 April 2017 32 | PSV | 1–0 | Ajax | Eindhoven |
| 16:45 CEST | Locadia 25', (yellow card) 87'; Van Ginkel (yellow card) 38'; Moreno (yellow card) 41'; Pereiro (yellow card) 90+4' | Report | Traoré (yellow card) 43'; Veltman (yellow card) 77'; Kluivert (yellow card) 87' | Stadium: Philips Stadion; Attendance: 35,000; Referee: Kevin Blom |

| 7 May 2017 33 | Ajax | 4–0 | Go Ahead Eagles | Amsterdam |
| 14:30 CEST | Kluivert 24'; Dolberg 29'; F. de Jong 48'; Cassierra 71' | Report | Ritzmaier (red card) 80' | Stadium: Amsterdam Arena; Attendance: 51,206; Referee: Pol van Boekel |

| 14 May 2017 34 | Willem II | 1–3 | Ajax | Tilburg |
| 14:30 CEST | Schuurman 82'; Peters (yellow card) 85' | Report | Dolberg 38'; Sánchez 48'; Klaassen 66' | Stadium: Koning Willem II Stadion; Attendance: 14,500; Referee: Serdar Gözübüyük |

=== KNVB Cup ===
| 21 September 2016 Round 1 | Ajax | 5–0 | Willem II | Amsterdam |
| 20:45 CEST | Bazoer 13'; De Ligt 25'; Westermann (yellow card) 63'; Ziyech 72'; Schöne 82'; Nouri 89' | report | Kali (red card) 58'; Heerkens (yellow card) 75' | Stadium: Amsterdam Arena; Attendance: 33,250; Referee: Danny Makkelie |

| 26 October 2016 Round 2 | Kozakken Boys | 1–6 | Ajax | Werkendam |
| 18:30 CEST | El Azzouti (yellow card) 13'; Mulder (yellow card) 54'; Mendes Moreira (yellow card) 63'; Ignacio 85' | report | Casierra 25', 33'; El Ghazi 29'; Černý 41'; De Ligt (yellow card) 48'; Clement 51', 89' | Stadium: Sportpark De Zwaaier; Attendance: 6,000; Referee: Jeroen Manschot |

| 15 December 2016 Round 3 | SC Cambuur | 2–1 | Ajax | Leeuwarden |
| 18:30 CEST | Barto 20', 39'; Blackson (yellow card) 40'; El Baad (yellow card) 66' | report | Nouri (yellow card) 50'; Clement 67'; Van de Beek (yellow card) 82' | Stadium: Cambuur Stadion; Attendance: 9,203; Referee: Kevin Blom |

=== UEFA Champions League ===
==== Third qualifying round ====
| 26 July 2016 First leg | Ajax (Netherlands) | 1–1 | (Greece) PAOK | Amsterdam, Netherlands |
| 20:45 CEST | Dolberg 58'; Schöne (yellow card) 90+2' | Report | Djalma 27'; Athanasiadis (yellow card) 30'; Glykos (yellow card) 74' | Stadium: Amsterdam Arena; Attendance: 45,640; Referee: Xavier Estrada Fernández (Spain) |

| 3 August 2016 Second leg | PAOK (Greece) | 1–2 (2–3 agg.) | (Netherlands) Ajax | Salonika, Greece |
| 20:45 CEST | Athanasiadis 4'; Leovac (yellow card) 45'; Crespo (yellow card) 56' | Report | Klaassen 45+1' (pen.), 88'; Gudelj (yellow card) 57'; Tete (yellow card) 66'; Riedewald (yellow card) 90+4' | Stadium: Stadio Toumba; Attendance: 24,930; Referee: Anthony Taylor (England) |

==== Play-off round ====
| 16 August 2016 First leg | Ajax (Netherlands) | 1–1 | (Russia) Rostov | Amsterdam, Netherlands |
| 20:45 CEST | Klaassen 38' (pen.), (yellow card) 65'; Veltman (yellow card) 88' | Report | Erokhin (yellow card) 8'; Noboa 13', (yellow card) 90'; Navas (yellow card) 37'; Kudryashov (yellow card) 52'; Ezatolahi (yellow card) 74'; Gațcan (yellow card) 89' | Stadium: Amsterdam Arena; Attendance: 51,463; Referee: Willie Collum (Scotland) |

| 24 August 2016 Second leg | Rostov (Russia) | 4–1 (5–2 agg.) | (Netherlands) Ajax | Rostov-on-Don, Russia |
| 20:45 CEST | Azmoun 34', (yellow card) 39'; Poloz (yellow card) 41', (goal) 66'; Erokhin 52'; Navas (yellow card) 53'; Noboa 60'; Kudrayashov (red card) 83' | Report | Klaassen 84' (pen.); Viergever (yellow card) 87' | Stadium: Olimp-2; Attendance: 15,320; Referee: Milorad Mažić (Serbia) |

=== UEFA Europa League ===
==== Group stage ====
| Pos | Team | Pld | W | D | L | GF | GA | GD | Pts | Qualification |
|---|---|---|---|---|---|---|---|---|---|---|
| 1 | (Netherlands) Ajax | 6 | 4 | 2 | 0 | 11 | 6 | +5 | 14 | Advance to knockout phase |
| 2 | (Spain) Celta Vigo | 6 | 2 | 3 | 1 | 10 | 7 | +3 | 9 | Advance to knockout phase |
| 3 | (Belgium) Standard Liège | 6 | 1 | 4 | 1 | 8 | 6 | +2 | 7 | |
| 4 | (Greece) Panathinaikos | 6 | 0 | 1 | 5 | 3 | 13 | −10 | 1 | |

Source: UEFA
Rules for classification: Group stage tiebreakers

| 15 September 2016 1 | Panathinaikos (Greece) | 1–2 | (Netherlands) Ajax | Athens, Greece |
| 21:05 CEST | Berg 5'; Koutroumpis (yellow card) 35'; Wakaso (yellow card) 61', (red card) 90+1'; Mesto (yellow card) 66'; Zeca (yellow card) 68'; Ivanov (yellow card) 59' (yellow-red card) 69'; Villafanez (yellow card) 71' | report | Traoré 34'; Viergever (yellow card) 42'; Riedewald 67'; Ziyech (yellow card) 55' (yellow-red card) 79'; Veltman (yellow card) 90+1' | Stadium: Leoforos Alexandras Stadium; Attendance: 13,019; Referee: Andre Marriner (England) |

| 29 September 2016 2 | Ajax (Netherlands) | 1–0 | (Belgium) Standard Liège | Amsterdam, Netherlands |
| 19:00 CEST | Dolberg 28'; Sinkgraven (yellow card) 38' | report | Belfodil (yellow card) 43'; Fai (yellow card) 72'; Dompé (yellow card) 78' | Stadium: Amsterdam Arena; Attendance: 31,352; Referee: Paolo Mazzoleni (Italy) |

| 20 October 2016 3 | Celta Vigo (Spain) | 2–2 | (Netherlands) Ajax | Vigo, Spain |
| 19:00 CEST | Fontàs 29'; Planas (yellow card) 80'; Orellana 82' | report | Sánchez (yellow card) 18'; Ziyech 22'; Gudelj (yellow card) 30'; Veltman (yellow card) 31'; Sinkgraven (yellow card) 57'; Younes 71'; Bazoer (yellow card) 90+2' | Stadium: Balaídos; Attendance: 18,397; Referee: Ivan Kružliak (Slovakia) |

| 3 November 2016 4 | Ajax (Netherlands) | 3–2 | (Spain) Celta Vigo | Amsterdam, Netherlands |
| 21:05 CEST | Schöne (yellow card) 12'; Dolberg 41'; Sánchez (yellow card) 59'; Ziyech 67'; Younes 71'; Sinkgraven (yellow card) 76'; Klaassen (yellow card) 90+1' | report | Mallo (yellow card) 38'; Radoja (yellow card) 74'; Guidetti 79', (yellow card) 88'; Aspas 86' | Stadium: Amsterdam Arena; Attendance: 44,545; Referee: Paweł Raczkowski (Poland) |

| 24 November 2016 5 | Ajax (Netherlands) | 2–0 | (Greece) Panathinaikos | Amsterdam, Netherlands |
| 19:00 CEST | Dijks (yellow card) 16'; Schöne 40'; Tete 50' | report | Villafáñez (yellow card) 14'; Wakaso (yellow card) 54' | Stadium: Amsterdam Arena; Attendance: 41,011; Referee: Aleksei Eskov (Russia) |

| 8 December 2016 6 | Standard Liège (Belgium) | 1–1 | (Netherlands) Ajax | Liège, Belgium |
| 21:05 CEST | Fiore (yellow card) 51'; Trebel (yellow card) 78'; Raman 85' | report | El Ghazi 27'; Tete (yellow card) 42'; Boer (yellow card) 59'; De Light (yellow card) 81' | Stadium: Stade Maurice Dufrasne; Attendance: 20,344; Referee: Bobby Madden (Scotland) |

==== Round of 32 ====
| 16 February 2017 First leg | Legia Warsaw (Poland) | 0–0 | (Netherlands) Ajax | Warsaw, Poland |
| 21:05 CEST | Broź (yellow card) 63'; Radović (yellow card) 70' | Report | Tete (yellow card) 71' (yellow-red card) 84'; Klaassen (yellow card) 84' | Stadium: Polish Army Stadium; Attendance: 28,742; Referee: David Fernández Borbalán (Spain) |

| 23 February 2017 Second leg | Ajax (Netherlands) | 1–0 (1–0 agg.) | (Poland) Legia Warsaw | Amsterdam, Netherlands |
| 19:00 CEST | Viergever 49'; Sánchez (yellow card) 71'; Traoré (yellow card) 75'; Veltman (yellow card) 86'; Onana (yellow card) 90+4' | Report | | Stadium: Amsterdam Arena; Attendance: 52,285; Referee: Anthony Taylor (England) |

==== Round of 16 ====
| 9 March 2017 First leg | Copenhagen (Denmark) | 2–1 | (Netherlands) Ajax | Copenhagen, Denmark |
| 19:00 CEST | Falk 1'; Jørgensen (yellow card) 21'; Cornelius 60' | Report | Dolberg 32'; Viergever (yellow card) 65'; Tete (yellow card) 71'; Schöne (yellow card) 77'; Klaassen (yellow card) 88' | Stadium: Telia Parken; Attendance: 31,189; Referee: Artur Soares Dias (Portugal) |

| 16 March 2017 Second leg | Ajax (Netherlands) | 2–0 (3–2 agg.) | (Denmark) Copenhagen | Amsterdam, Netherlands |
| 21:05 CEST | Traoré 23'; Sánchez (yellow card) 34'; Dolberg 45+2' (pen.); Younes (yellow card) 48'; Schöne (yellow card) 78'; Onana (yellow card) 90+4' | Report | Greguš (yellow card) 19'; Matíc (yellow card) 31'; Verbič (yellow card) 66'; Johansson (yellow card) 80'; Santander (yellow card) 87' | Stadium: Amsterdam Arena; Attendance: 52,270; Referee: Ivan Kružliak (Slovakia) |

==== Quarter-finals ====
| 13 April 2017 First leg | Ajax (Netherlands) | 2–0 | (Germany) Schalke 04 | Amsterdam, Netherlands |
| 21:05 CEST | Klaassen 23' (pen.), 52', (yellow card) 48'; Neres (yellow card) 89' | Report | Kehrer (yellow card) 87'; Stambouli (yellow card) 88' | Stadium: Amsterdam Arena; Attendance: 52,384; Referee: Sergei Karasev (Russia) |

| 20 April 2017 Second leg | Schalke 04 (Germany) | 3–2 (a.e.t.) (3–4 agg.) | (Netherlands) Ajax | Gelsenkirchen, Germany |
| 21:05 CEST | Goretzka 53'; Burgstaller 56' (yellow card) 60'; Kolašinac (yellow card) 68'; Nastasić (yellow card) 86'; Caligiuri 101' | Report | Veltman (yellow card) 72' (yellow-red card) 80'; Viergever (yellow card) 90', (goal) 111'; Ziyech (yellow card) 90+5'; Younes 120' | Stadium: Veltins-Arena; Attendance: 53,701; Referee: Ovidiu Hațegan (Romania) |

==== Semi-final ====
| 3 May 2017 First leg | Ajax (Netherlands) | 4–1 | (France) Lyon | Amsterdam, Netherlands |
| 18:45 CEST | Traoré 25', 71', (yellow card) 62'; De Ligt (yellow card) 30'; Dolberg 34'; Younes 49' | Report | Gonalons (yellow card) 41'; Valbuena 66' | Stadium: Amsterdam Arena; Attendance: 52,141; Referee: Gianluca Rocchi (Italy) |

| 11 May 2017 Second leg | Lyon (France) | 3–1 (4−5 agg.) | (Netherlands) Ajax | Lyon, France |
| 21:05 CEST | Morel (yellow card) 18'; Tolisso (yellow card) 20'; Lacazette 45' (pen.), 45+1'; Diakhaby (yellow card) 49'; Nkoulou (yellow card) 61'; Fekir (yellow card) 62'; Ghezzal 81' | Report | Dolberg 25'; Veltman (yellow card) 49'; Klaassen (yellow card) 50'; Viergever (yellow card) 68' (yellow-red card) 84' | Stadium: Parc Olympique Lyonnais, Décines-Charpieu; Attendance: 53,810; Referee: Szymon Marciniak (Poland) |

==== Final ====
| 24 May 2017 Final | Ajax (Netherlands) | 0–2 | (England) Manchester United | Solna, Sweden |
| 20:45 UTC+2 | Veltman (yellow card) 58'; Younes (yellow card) 64'; Riedewald (yellow card) 78' | Report | Pogba 18'; Mkhitaryan (yellow card) 31' (goal) 48'; Fellaini (yellow card) 52'; Mata (yellow card) 78' | Stadium: Friends Arena; Attendance: 46,961; Referee: Damir Skomina (Slovenia) |

=== Friendlies ===
| 9 July 2016 | Ajax (Netherlands) | 3–4 | (Austria) FC Liefering | Hippach, Austria |
| 16:00 CEST | El Ghazi 68', 69'; Van de Beek 79' | Report | Hwang 15'; Oberlin 23'; Grabovac 75'; Berisha 90' | Stadium: Lindenstadion; Referee: Christoph Hofer |

| 12 July 2016 | Amsterdamsche FC (Netherlands) | 2–2 | (Netherlands) Ajax | Amsterdam, Netherlands |
| 19:00 CEST | Bosma 31'; Jesse 57' | Report | Schöne 55'; Murić 79' | Stadium: Sportpark Goed Genoeg |

| 16 July 2016 | Ajax (Netherlands) | 0–2 | (Belgium) Gent | Amsterdam, Netherlands |
| 15:00 CEST | | Report | Coulibaly 13'; Riedewald 46' (o.g.) | Stadium: Sportpark De Toekomst |

| 16 July 2016 | Ajax (Netherlands) | 1–2 | (Russia) Krylia Sovetov Samara | Amsterdam, Netherlands |
| 18:00 CEST | Cassierra 10' | Report | Rodić 6'; Tkache 69' | Stadium: Sportpark De Toekomst |

| 20 July 2016 | Béziers (France) | 0–2 | (Netherlands) Ajax | Béziers, France |
| 15:00 CEST | | Report | Sinkgraven 58'; Zivkovic 69' | Stadium: Stade de la Méditerranée |

| 20 July 2016 | Marseille (France) | 2–2 | (Netherlands) Ajax | Béziers, France |
| 20:00 CEST | Sarr 60' (pen.); Alessandrini 63' | Report | Cassierra 7'; Dolberg 86' | Stadium: Stade de la Méditerranée |

| 6 October 2016 | Ajax (Netherlands) | 2–1 | (Netherlands) NEC | Amsterdam, Netherlands |
| | Mazraoui 26'; El Idrissi 48' | Report | Grot 48' | Stadium: Sportpark De Toekomst |

| 10 November 2016 | Ajax (Netherlands) | 2–0 | (Netherlands) Achilles '29 | Amsterdam, Netherlands |
| | Cassierra 2', 13' | Report | | Stadium: Sportpark De Toekomst |

| 7 January 2017 | Ajax (Netherlands) | 1–3 | (Netherlands) Excelsior | Ferreiras, Portugal |
| | Dijks 70' | Report | Hasselbaink 11'; Hadouir 78'; Mattheij 82' | Stadium: Estádio da Nora |

| 7 January 2017 | Ajax (Netherlands) | 5–1 | (Germany) RB Leipzig | Ferreiras, Portugal |
| | Younes 22', 39', 46'; Dolberg 37'; El Ghazi 81' | Report | Selke 74' | Stadium: Estádio da Nora |

== Transfers for 2016–17 ==
=== Summer transfer window ===
For a list of all Dutch football transfers in the summer window (1 July 2016 to 31 August 2016) please see List of Dutch football transfers summer 2016.

==== Arrivals ====
- The following players moved to AFC Ajax.

| | Name | Position | Transfer type | Previous club | Fee |
| | Return from loan spell | | | | |
|---|---|---|---|---|---|
| Substituted on | (Netherlands) Lerin Duarte | Midfielder | 30 June 2016 | (Netherlands) NAC Breda | - |
| Substituted on | (Netherlands) Ruben Ligeon | Defender | 30 June 2016 | (Netherlands) FC Utrecht | - |
| Substituted on | (Morocco) Zakaria El Azzouzi | Forward | 30 June 2016 | (Netherlands) FC Twente | - |
| Substituted on | (Iceland) Óttar Magnús Karlsson | Defender | 30 June 2016 | (Netherlands) Sparta Rotterdam | - |
| Substituted on | (Denmark) Lucas Andersen | Forward | 30 June 2016 | (Netherlands) Willem II | - |
| Substituted on | (Netherlands) Queensy Menig | Forward | 30 June 2016 | (Netherlands) PEC Zwolle | - |
| Substituted on | (Netherlands) Sheraldo Becker | Forward | 30 June 2016 | (Netherlands) PEC Zwolle | - |
| Substituted on | (Netherlands) Lesly de Sa | Forward | 30 June 2016 | (Netherlands) Willem II | - |
| Substituted on | (Netherlands) Xavier Mous | Goalkeeper | 30 June 2016 | (Netherlands) Oss | - |
| | Loan | | | | |
| Substituted on | (Netherlands) Tim Krul | Goalkeeper | 25 August 2016 | (England) Newcastle United | - |
| Substituted on | (Burkina Faso) Bertrand Traoré | Forward | 12 August 2016 | (England) Chelsea | €2,000,000 |
| | Transfer | | | | |
| Substituted on | (Morocco) Hakim Ziyech | Midfielder | 30 August 2016 | (Netherlands) Twente | €11,000,000 |
| Substituted on | (Colombia) Davinson Sánchez | Defender | 21 June 2016 | (Colombia) Atlético Nacional | €5,000,000 |
| Substituted on | (Colombia) Mateo Casierra | Forward | 17 June 2016 | (Colombia) Deportivo Cali | €5,000,000 |
| | Free Transfer | | | | |
| Substituted on | (Germany) Heiko Westermann | Defender | 14 July 2016 | (Spain) Real Betis | - |
| Substituted on | (Netherlands) Boy Kemper | Defender | 11 May 2016 | (Netherlands) Volendam | - |
| Substituted on | (Netherlands) Danilho Doekhi | Defender | 2 May 2016 | (Netherlands) Excelsior | - |
| Substituted on | (Netherlands) Pascal Struijk | Defender | 19 April 2016 | (Netherlands) ADO Den Haag | - |
| Substituted on | (Netherlands) Abdallah Aberkane | Defender | 11 April 2016 | (Netherlands) ADO Den Haag | - |

==== Departures ====
- The following players moved from AFC Ajax.

| | Name | Position | Transfer type | New club | Fee |
| | Out on loan | | | | |
|---|---|---|---|---|---|
| Substituted off | (Croatia) Robert Murić | Forward | 20 August 2016 | (Italy) Pescara | - |
| Substituted off | (Netherlands) Richairo Zivkovic | Forward | 30 June 2016 | (Netherlands) Utrecht | - |
| Substituted off | (Netherlands) Indy Groothuizen | Goalkeeper | 30 June 2016 | (Denmark) Nordsjælland | - |
| Substituted off | (Netherlands) Django Warmerdam | Defender | 30 June 2016 | (Netherlands) PEC Zwolle | - |
| Substituted off | (Netherlands) Leeroy Owusu | Defender | 30 June 2016 | (Netherlands) Excelsior | - |
| Substituted off | (Netherlands) Queensy Menig | Forward | 30 June 2016 | (Netherlands) PEC Zwolle | - |
| Substituted off | (Morocco) Zakaria El Azzouzi | Forward | 30 June 2016 | (Netherlands) Sparta Rotterdam | - |
| | Transfer | | | | |
| Substituted off | (Netherlands) Jasper Cillessen | Goalkeeper | 25 August 2016 | (Spain) Barcelona | €13,000,000 + €2,000,000 variables |
| Substituted off | (Netherlands) Sheraldo Becker | Forward | 21 August 2016 | (Netherlands) ADO Den Haag | €200,000 |
| Substituted off | (Poland) Arkadiusz Milik | Forward | 2 August 2016 | (Italy) Napoli | €32,000,000 |
| Substituted off | (Netherlands) Ricardo van Rhijn | Defender | 18 July 2016 | (Belgium) Club Brugge | €1,800,000 |
| Substituted off | (Netherlands) Mike van der Hoorn | Defender | 5 July 2016 | (England) Swansea City | €2,500,000 |
| Substituted off | (Denmark) Lucas Andersen | Forward | 5 July 2016 | (Switzerland) Grasshopper | €1,500,000 |
| Substituted off | (Denmark) Viktor Fischer | Forward | 26 May 2016 | (England) Middlesbrough | €5,000,000 |
| | Free Transfer | | | | |
| Substituted off | (Netherlands) Danny Bakker | Midfielder | 5 September 2016 | (Netherlands) Cambuur | - |
| Substituted off | (Netherlands) Lerin Duarte | Midfielder | 11 August 2016 | (Netherlands) Heracles Almelo | - |
| Substituted off | (Netherlands) Elton Acolatse | Forward | 21 July 2016 | (Belgium) Westerlo | - |
| Substituted off | (Netherlands) Lesly de Sa | Forward | 1 July 2016 | (Slovakia) Slovan Bratislava | - |
| Substituted off | (Denmark) Nicolai Boilesen | Defender | 1 July 2016 | (Denmark) Copenhagen | - |
| Substituted off | (Netherlands) Milan Vissie | Midfielder | 1 July 2016 | (Netherlands) Cambuur | - |
| Substituted off | (Netherlands) Aschraf El Mahdioui | Midfielder | 1 July 2016 | (Netherlands) ADO Den Haag | - |
| Substituted off | (Netherlands) Philippe Sandler | Forward | 17 June 2016 | (Netherlands) PEC Zwolle | - |
| Substituted off | (Netherlands) Sam Hendriks | Forward | 15 June 2016 | (Netherlands) Go Ahead Eagles | - |
| Substituted off | (Netherlands) Ruben Ligeon | Defender | 9 June 2016 | (Slovakia) Slovan Bratislava | - |
| Substituted off | (Netherlands) Damon Mirani | Defender | 31 May 2016 | (Netherlands) Almere City | - |
| Substituted off | (Netherlands) Xavier Mous | Goalkeeper | 19 May 2016 | (Netherlands) Oss | - |
| Substituted off | (Netherlands) Jordy Bruijn | Midfielder | 13 May 2016 | (Netherlands) Heerenveen | - |
| Substituted off | (Iceland) Óttar Magnús Karlsson | Forward | 22 April 2016 | (Iceland) Víkingur Reykjavík | - |
| Substituted off | (Netherlands) Damian van Bruggen | Defender | 19 April 2016 | (Netherlands) PSV | - |
| Substituted off | (Netherlands) Juan Familia-Castillo | Midfielder | 1 July 2016 | (England) Chelsea | - |
| Substituted off | (Netherlands) Millen Baars | Forward | 1 July 2016 | (England) Manchester United | - |

=== Winter transfer window ===
For a list of all Dutch football transfers in the winter window (1 January 2017 to 1 February 2017) please see List of Dutch football transfers winter 2016–17.

==== Arrivals ====
- The following players moved to AFC Ajax.

| | Name | Position | Transfer type | Previous club | Fee |
| | Transfer | | | | |
|---|---|---|---|---|---|
| Substituted on | (Australia) Sebastian Pasquali | Midfielder | 1 January 2017 | (Australia) Melbourne Victory | ? |
| Substituted on | (Brazil) David Neres | Forward | 31 January 2017 | (Brazil) São Paulo | €12,000,000 + €3,000,000 variables |
| | Free Transfer | | | | |
| Substituted on | (Poland) Mateusz Górski | Goalkeeper | 24 January 2017 | (Poland) Śląsk Wrocław | - |

==== Departures ====
- The following players moved from AFC Ajax.

| | Name | Position | Transfer type | New club | Fee |
| | Out on loan | | | | |
|---|---|---|---|---|---|
| Substituted off | (Netherlands) Mitchell Dijks | Defender | 30 January 2017 | (England) Norwich City | - |
| | Return from loan spell | | | | |
| Substituted off | (Netherlands) Tim Krul | Goalkeeper | 31 January 2017 | (England) Newcastle United | - |
| | Transfer | | | | |
| Substituted off | (Netherlands) Riechedly Bazoer | Midfielder | 1 January 2017 | (Germany) VfL Wolfsburg | €12,000,000 |
| Substituted off | (Serbia) Nemanja Gudelj | Midfielder | 5 January 2017 | (China) Tianjin TEDA | €5,500,000 |
| Substituted off | (Belgium) Francesco Antonucci | Midfielder | 7 January 2017 | (France) Monaco | €2,500,000 |
| Substituted off | (Netherlands) Anwar El Ghazi | Forward | 31 January 2017 | (France) Lille | €8,500,000 |
| | Free Transfer | | | | |
| Substituted off | (Netherlands) Adham El Idrissi | Midfielder | 16 January 2017 | (Netherlands) Roda JC | - |
