= 2019–20 Manchester United F.C. season =

English football club season

Manchester United
2019–20 season
- Co-chairmen: Joel and Avram Glazer
- Manager: Ole Gunnar Solskjær
- Stadium: Old Trafford
- Premier League: 3rd
- FA Cup: Semi-finals
- EFL Cup: Semi-finals
- UEFA Europa League: Semi-finals
- Top goalscorer: League: Anthony Martial; Marcus Rashford (17 goals each); All: Anthony Martial (23)
- Highest home attendance: 73,737 (v. Liverpool, 20 October 2019)
- Lowest home attendance: 50,783 (v. Astana, 19 September 2019)
- Average home league attendance: 73,393
Home colours	Away colours	Third colours

The 2019–20 season was Manchester United's 28th season in the Premier League and their 45th consecutive season in the top flight of English football. The club participated in the Premier League, finishing third, and reached the semi-finals of the FA Cup, the EFL Cup and the UEFA Europa League. The defeat in the Europa League made this United's first hat-trick of trophyless seasons since 1989.

This was United's first full season under manager Ole Gunnar Solskjær, who took permanent charge in March 2019. It was also their first season since 2008–09 and 2013–14 without club captain Antonio Valencia and Ander Herrera, who both left the club at the end of the previous season. Solskjær named Ashley Young as Valencia's successor as club captain. Upon Young's departure for Inter Milan in January 2020, he was replaced as club captain by Harry Maguire.

After being no higher than fifth place in the league since their sixth match in September 2019, United moved up to third place with a draw at home to West Ham United in the penultimate match of the season; they confirmed their third-place finish and a spot in the 2020–21 UEFA Champions League with a 2–0 victory at Leicester City on the final day of the season on 26 July, their 14th consecutive league game without defeat. The season featured a three-month hiatus from March to June 2020 after the outbreak of the global COVID-19 pandemic.

== Pre-season and friendlies ==
=== Pre-season ===
United preceded their 2019–20 campaign with a pre-season tour, with matches in Australia, Singapore, China, Norway and Wales. The first two matches were played at the Perth Stadium in Perth, Australia; the first was a 2–0 win over local side Perth Glory, with goals from Marcus Rashford and James Garner, followed by a meeting with historic rivals Leeds United, which the Red Devils won 4–0 thanks to goals from Rashford, Phil Jones, Anthony Martial, as well as a maiden senior goal for Mason Greenwood.

United also took part in the 2019 International Champions Cup. They began with a match against Internazionale in Singapore on 20 July, in which Greenwood scored the only goal to give United a 1–0 win, followed by a match against Tottenham Hotspur in Shanghai five days later, winning 2–1 thanks to goals from Martial and Angel Gomes. They then travelled to Norway to play an additional friendly against Kristiansund BK, the hometown club of Norwegian manager Ole Gunnar Solskjær, winning it 1–0 through an injury-time penalty by Juan Mata. Their final game in the International Champions Cup and final pre-season game saw them play against Milan in Cardiff on 3 August, winning 5–4 in a penalty shoot-out after the match ended in a 2–2 draw, with goals from Rashford and Jesse Lingard; Wales international Daniel James scored the winning penalty.

Date	Opponents	H / A	Result F–A	Scorers	Attendance
13 July 2019	Perth Glory	N	2–0	Rashford 60', Garner 85'	50,206
17 July 2019	Leeds United	N	4–0	Greenwood 7', Rashford 27', Jones 51', Martial 69' (pen.)	55,274
20 July 2019	Internazionale	N	1–0	Greenwood 76'	52,897
25 July 2019	Tottenham Hotspur	N	2–1	Martial 21', Gomes 80'	
30 July 2019	Kristiansund	N	1–0	Mata 90+2' (pen.)	
3 August 2019	Milan	N	2–2 (5–4p)	Rashford 14', Lingard 72'	65,892

=== Mid-season ===
As a result of the COVID-19 pandemic in the United Kingdom, Premier League football was suspended on 13 March 2020; following the announcement in early June that the league would be resuming in mid-June, United first played an intra-squad friendly match at Old Trafford, before arranging another friendly against Stoke City for 9 June; however, this match was cancelled after Stoke manager Michael O'Neill tested positive for COVID-19. United did eventually return to action on 12 June, playing two matches against West Bromwich Albion behind closed doors at Old Trafford; West Brom won the first match 2–1, but United won the second 3–1.

Date	Opponents	H / A	Result F–A	Scorers	Attendance
12 June 2020	West Bromwich Albion	H	1–2	Fernandes (pen.)	0
12 June 2020	West Bromwich Albion	H	3–1	Pereira (2), Chong	0

== Premier League ==
=== Matches ===
The Premier League fixtures were announced on 13 June 2019. Manchester United began their season at home to Chelsea on 11 August; a goal in each half from Marcus Rashford, in addition to goals from Anthony Martial and debutant Daniel James, gave United a 4–0 win. United were held to a 1–1 draw by Wolverhampton Wanderers in their next game; Martial opened the scoring with his 50th goal for the club before Rúben Neves equalised with a long-range strike, only for Paul Pogba to miss from the penalty spot midway through the second half. United suffered their first defeat of the season on 24 August, losing 2–1 at home to Crystal Palace. After Jordan Ayew put the Eagles 1–0 up against the run of play with just over half an hour gone, it took until the final minute of normal time for Daniel James to find the equaliser; however, Patrick van Aanholt's injury-time strike gave Palace their first league win over United since May 1991 and their first league win at Old Trafford since December 1989. James continued his goalscoring form in United's final game before the international break away to Southampton, opening the scoring after 10 minutes. Jannik Vestergaard equalised for the home side just before the hour mark, but although Kevin Danso was sent off with 17 minutes to go, United were unable to make their numerical advantage count and the match finished as a 1–1 draw.

United returned to action after the international break with a home game against Leicester City. Marcus Rashford scored the only goal of the game from the penalty spot to give United their first win since the opening day of the season. United's next match, away to West Ham United, ended in a 2–0 defeat, with a goal each from Andriy Yarmolenko and Aaron Cresswell. United then played Arsenal at home; Scott McTominay opened the scoring with his first senior goal at Old Trafford, but Pierre-Emerick Aubameyang was awarded the equaliser after the video assistant referee (VAR) overruled the assistant referee's original decision that he was offside. United's final match before the second international break of the season was away to Newcastle United, who won 1–0 thanks to a goal from Matty Longstaff on his senior debut.

United returned to action after the second international break with a home game against arch-rivals Liverpool. Marcus Rashford opened the scoring after a VAR check, as Victor Lindelöf was ruled not to have fouled Divock Origi. The VAR was used again to check a goal scored by Sadio Mané, which appeared to have come off his arm, and was eventually ruled out for handball. Liverpool did manage to find an equaliser through substitute Adam Lallana in the 85th minute to secure a vital point for both teams. The result meant that United ended Liverpool's winning streak at 18 games. On 27 October 2019, Scott McTominay netted United's recordbreaking 2,000th Premier League goal in a 3–1 victory against Norwich City at Carrow Road. Rashford had a penalty saved by Tim Krul a few minutes later, but scored on United's next attack to put them 2–0 up with less than half an hour played. United were awarded a second penalty for a handball by Todd Cantwell, but despite a change of taker, Krul was able to make another save from Martial. Like Rashford, Martial made amends later by scoring United's third goal. Onel Hernández scored a consolation goal for Norwich City in the 88th minute.

To begin November, United made the trip to Bournemouth, where former United striker Joshua King scored on the stroke of half-time to give Bournemouth a 1–0 win. The result dropped United down to 10th position in the league table and gave Bournemouth their first win since September 2019. United's next home match before the third international break of the season was against Brighton & Hove Albion, where goals from Andreas Pereira (his first of the season), Scott McTominay and Marcus Rashford helped United to a 3–1 win. The second goal was initially given as an own goal by Davy Pröpper, but was later awarded to McTominay. United drew against Sheffield United in a game which saw Brandon Williams scoring his first senior goal and Mason Greenwood scoring his first Premier League goal, and Aston Villa, in which Victor Lindelöf scored his first goal of the season, On 4 December, United beat Tottenham Hotspur 2–1 through a Marcus Rashford brace. Three days later, they faced last season's champions Manchester City in the Manchester derby at the Etihad Stadium. Twenty minutes into the first half, United were awarded a penalty, which Rashford converted; five minutes later, Anthony Martial made the scoreline 2–0. Despite a goal for City by Nicolás Otamendi late into the second half, United emerged victorious. A draw against Everton was followed by defeat at Watford. Victories against Newcastle United and Burnley brought the club's decade to a close.

The 2020s was started with a defeat at Arsenal on New Year's Day. Ten days later, United recorded their first win of the decade with a 4–0 demolition of Norwich City; Rashford scored twice, Martial and Greenwood scored once each. On the following three league matches the club failed to score, the first two ended in 2–0 defeats; matches against the runaway league leaders Liverpool and a revenge by Burnley, which turned out to be their last defeat of the season, were followed by a goalless draw against Wolverhampton Wanderers. After the newly introduced winter break, United got full 3 points at Chelsea, extending their undefeated run against the West London club to six matches. Watford was the next victim, falling three goals to nil at Old Trafford. The newly recruited Portuguese midfielder Bruno Fernandes scored the first goal from the spot, his first goal for the club. The fixture against Everton was again ended in a 1–1 draw with David de Gea making an error leading up to the home side's goal before Fernandes' equaliser, his first open play goal for United. The next week, United won 2–0 against Manchester City thanks to a goal by Anthony Martial and a last minute 40-yard volley from Scott McTominay, both of which were the result of goalkeeping errors from City keeper Ederson. The victory completed their first league double over their city rivals since the 2009–10 season.

Due to the COVID-19 pandemic, Premier League matches were suspended on 13 March, initially only until 3 April 2020. The suspension was made indefinite on 5 April 2020. On 28 May, it was announced that the Premier League would return behind closed doors on 17 June.

The return of the league on 19 June saw United draw 1–1 at Tottenham Hotspur; Fernandes equalised with a penalty kick after Steven Bergwijn's opening goal. In a 3–0 home win against Sheffield United on 24 June, Martial scored his first senior hat-trick, as well as United's first league hat-trick since Robin van Persie did so on 22 April 2013. On 30 June, after the opening goal by Greenwood, Fernandes scored his first brace for United in a 3–0 win against Brighton & Hove Albion. Both players found the net again in the match against Bournemouth; Fernandes scored one after Greenwood made his first league brace. Martial and Rashford scored one each as United won 5–2. On 9 July, both Fernandes and Greenwood scored again, with Paul Pogba adding his first goal of the season in a 3–0 win at Aston Villa. The win made United the first team in Premier League history to win four consecutive games by three goals or more, and the first to do so in the top flight since Liverpool in October 1987. United went behind early in their match against Southampton on 13 July, before Rashford and Martial put them into the lead with two quick goals midway through the first half; however, Michael Obafemi scored a 96th-minute equaliser and the match finished 2–2, denying United an opportunity to jump to third in the table. Away to Crystal Palace, Rashford scored and then assisted Martial's goal as United won 2–0 at Selhurst Park. In this match, defender Timothy Fosu-Mensah made his first start since May 2017. In the penultimate match of the season against West Ham, United went 1–0 down to a Michail Antonio penalty on the stroke of half-time, but Mason Greenwood's equaliser early in the second half salvaged a 1–1 draw that moved United back into the top four for the first time since September 2019. A third-place finish was confirmed on the final day of the season, as a penalty from Bruno Fernandes – the 14th United had been awarded in the league that season (a Premier League record) – and a 98th-minute goal from Jesse Lingard – his first in the league since 22 December 2018 – secured a 2–0 victory away to Leicester City, meaning United finished the season unbeaten in their final 14 matches and qualified for the 2020–21 UEFA Champions League.

Date	Opponents	H / A	Result F–A	Scorers	Attendance	League position
11 August 2019	Chelsea	H	4–0	Rashford (2) 18' (pen.), 67', Martial 65', James 81'	73,620	2nd
19 August 2019	Wolverhampton Wanderers	A	1–1	Martial 27'	31,314	4th
24 August 2019	Crystal Palace	H	1–2	James 89'	73,454	5th
31 August 2019	Southampton	A	1–1	James 10'	30,499	7th
14 September 2019	Leicester City	H	1–0	Rashford 8' (pen.)	73,689	4th
22 September 2019	West Ham United	A	0–2		59,936	8th
30 September 2019	Arsenal	H	1–1	McTominay 45'	73,201	10th
6 October 2019	Newcastle United	A	0–1		51,198	12th
20 October 2019	Liverpool	H	1–1	Rashford 36'	73,737	14th
27 October 2019	Norwich City	A	3–1	McTominay 21', Rashford 30', Martial 73'	27,108	7th
2 November 2019	Bournemouth	A	0–1		10,669	10th
10 November 2019	Brighton & Hove Albion	H	3–1	Pereira 17', McTominay 19', Rashford 66'	73,556	7th
24 November 2019	Sheffield United	A	3–3	Williams 72', Greenwood 77', Rashford 79'	32,024	9th
1 December 2019	Aston Villa	H	2–2	Heaton 42' (o.g.), Lindelöf 64'	73,381	9th
4 December 2019	Tottenham Hotspur	H	2–1	Rashford (2) 7', 49' (pen.)	73,252	6th
7 December 2019	Manchester City	A	2–1	Rashford 23' (pen.), Martial 29'	54,403	5th
15 December 2019	Everton	H	1–1	Greenwood 77'	73,328	6th
22 December 2019	Watford	A	0–2		21,488	8th
26 December 2019	Newcastle United	H	4–1	Martial (2) 24', 51', Greenwood 36', Rashford 41'	73,206	8th
28 December 2019	Burnley	A	2–0	Martial 44', Rashford 90+5'	21,924	5th
1 January 2020	Arsenal	A	0–2		60,328	5th
11 January 2020	Norwich City	H	4–0	Rashford (2) 27', 52' (pen.), Martial 54', Greenwood 76'	73,271	5th
19 January 2020	Liverpool	A	0–2		52,916	5th
22 January 2020	Burnley	H	0–2		73,198	5th
1 February 2020	Wolverhampton Wanderers	H	0–0		73,363	7th
17 February 2020	Chelsea	A	2–0	Martial 45', Maguire 66'	40,504	7th
23 February 2020	Watford	H	3–0	Fernandes 42' (pen.), Martial 58', Greenwood 75'	73,347	5th
1 March 2020	Everton	A	1–1	Fernandes 31'	39,374	5th
8 March 2020	Manchester City	H	2–0	Martial 30', McTominay 90+6'	73,288	5th
19 June 2020	Tottenham Hotspur	A	1–1	Fernandes 81' (pen.)	0	5th
24 June 2020	Sheffield United	H	3–0	Martial (3) 7', 44', 74'	0	5th
30 June 2020	Brighton & Hove Albion	A	3–0	Greenwood 16', Fernandes (2) 29', 50'	0	5th
4 July 2020	Bournemouth	H	5–2	Greenwood (2) 29', 54', Rashford 35' (pen.), Martial 45'+2, Fernandes 59'	0	5th
9 July 2020	Aston Villa	A	3–0	Fernandes 27' (pen.), Greenwood 45'+5, Pogba 58'	0	5th
13 July 2020	Southampton	H	2–2	Rashford 20', Martial 23'	0	5th
16 July 2020	Crystal Palace	A	2–0	Rashford 45'+1, Martial 78'	0	5th
22 July 2020	West Ham United	H	1–1	Greenwood 51'	0	3rd
26 July 2020	Leicester City	A	2–0	Fernandes 71' (pen.), Lingard 90'+8	0	3rd

=== League table ===
Pos	Team	Pld	W	D	L	GF	GA	GD	Pts	Qualification or relegation
1	Liverpool (C)	38	32	3	3	85	33	+52	99	Qualification for the Champions League group stage
2	Manchester City	38	26	3	9	102	35	+67	81	Qualification for the Champions League group stage
3	Manchester United	38	18	12	8	66	36	+30	66	Qualification for the Champions League group stage
4	Chelsea	38	20	6	12	69	54	+15	66	Qualification for the Champions League group stage
5	Leicester City	38	18	8	12	67	41	+26	62	Qualification for the Europa League group stage

Source: Premier League
Rules for classification: 1) Points; 2) Goal difference; 3) Goals scored; 4) If the champions, relegated teams or qualified teams for UEFA competitions cannot be determined by rules 1 to 3, rules 4.1 to 4.3 are applied – 4.1) Points gained in head to head record between such teams; 4.2) Away goals scored in head to head record between such teams; 4.3) Play-offs
(C) Champions

== FA Cup ==
As a Premier League side, Manchester United entered the 2019–20 FA Cup in the Third Round Proper. The draw gave United an away tie at fellow Premier League side Wolverhampton Wanderers. The match was played on 4 January 2020 and finished goalless, requiring a replay later that month. The Fourth Round draw took place on 5 January, with United – were they to beat Wolves in their replay – drawn away to either Watford or Tranmere Rovers. The replay was played on 15 January and saw Juan Mata score the only goal of the game to put United through. Playing at Prenton Park against Tranmere, who had eliminated Watford just three days prior, United won 6–0; Harry Maguire and Diogo Dalot both scored their first goals for the club. In the fifth round, United came up against Derby County and former striker Wayne Rooney. In a 3–0 win at Pride Park, Odion Ighalo scored his first brace for United following Luke Shaw's first goal of the season.

After a three-month delay due to the COVID-19 pandemic, the quarter-final tie against Norwich City was played on 27 June 2020. Ighalo opened the scoring before an equaliser from Todd Cantwell. Deep into extra time, Maguire scored to send United to the semi-finals, where they were drawn against Chelsea. Having played against Chelsea in the EFL Cup earlier in the season, it was the first time in seven years that United had faced the same opponents in both domestic cup competitions in one season; the last time was also against Chelsea in 2012–13. However, the FA Cup results on both occasions were same; United succumbed to Chelsea. They suffered their first defeat to the West London club since the 2018 FA Cup Final, as well as ending their 19-game unbeaten run in all competitions.

Date	Round	Opponents	H / A	Result F–A	Scorers	Attendance
4 January 2020	Round 3	Wolverhampton Wanderers	A	0–0		31,381
15 January 2020	Round 3 Replay	Wolverhampton Wanderers	H	1–0	Mata 67'	67,025
26 January 2020	Round 4	Tranmere Rovers	A	6–0	Maguire 10', Dalot 13', Lingard 16', Jones 41', Martial 45', Greenwood 56' (pen.)	13,779
5 March 2020	Round 5	Derby County	A	3–0	Shaw 33', Ighalo (2) 41', 70'	31,379
27 June 2020 (Note: On 13 March 2020, it was unanimously agreed between the Football Association, the Premier League and the English Football League to suspend professional football in England, until at least 4 April before later extension to 30 April 2020 due to the COVID-19 pandemic in the United Kingdom. The match was originally scheduled to play on 22 March 2020.)	Quarter-finals	Norwich City	A	2–1 (a.e.t.)	Ighalo 51', Maguire 118'	0
19 July 2020	Semi-finals	Chelsea	N	1–3	Fernandes 85' (pen.)	0

== EFL Cup ==
As one of the seven English sides competing in UEFA competitions in 2019–20, Manchester United entered the 2019–20 EFL Cup in the third round. The draw for the third round took place on 28 August 2019, and saw United given a home tie against League One side Rochdale. It was only the second time they had met in a competitive, first-team match; their only other meeting was in the third round of the 1985–86 FA Cup, when Manchester United won 2–0. The match was played on 25 September, with Mason Greenwood opening the scoring in the 68th minute; however, 16-year-old Luke Matheson equalised for Rochdale eight minutes later. The match finished at 1–1 after 90 minutes and went straight to penalties; Sergio Romero saved Rochdale's second penalty from Jimmy Keohane, while all Manchester United's kicks were successful, culminating with Daniel James scoring the winning penalty.

In the fourth round, Manchester United were drawn away to Chelsea; it was the sixth time they had met in the competition, most recently in 2012–13, when Chelsea won 5–4 after extra time. Marcus Rashford scored twice to record a 2–1 win, securing their passage to the fifth round and extending their unbeaten run against Chelsea in all competitions to five matches; their last loss to Chelsea was in the 2018 FA Cup Final.

United won their fifth round match against the last surviving non-Premier League club, Colchester United, with goals from Marcus Rashford, Anthony Martial, and an own goal. They were drawn to play local rivals Manchester City in the two-legged semi-final in January. City's 3–1 win in the first leg at Old Trafford was enough to send them to their third successive EFL Cup final, as United were only able to manage a 1–0 win in the second leg at the City of Manchester Stadium.

Date	Round	Opponents	H / A	Result F–A	Scorers	Attendance
25 September 2019	Round 3	Rochdale	H	1–1 (5–3p)	Greenwood 68'	58,314
30 October 2019	Round 4	Chelsea	A	2–1	Rashford (2) 25' (pen.), 73'	38,645
18 December 2019	Quarter-finals	Colchester United	H	3–0	Rashford 51', Jackson 56' (o.g.), Martial 61'	57,559
7 January 2020	Semi-finals; First leg	Manchester City	H	1–3	Rashford 70'	69,023
29 January 2020	Semi-finals; Second leg	Manchester City	A	1–0	Matić 35'	51,000

== UEFA Europa League ==
=== Group stage ===
Having finished sixth in the 2018–19 Premier League, Manchester United entered the 2019–20 UEFA Europa League in the group stage. It was the club's first Europa League campaign since winning the competition in 2016–17, and their fourth in nine years, having also played in the knockout phase in 2011–12 and 2015–16. The draw for the group stage took place in Monaco on 30 August 2019; United were drawn into Group L with Kazakhstani side Astana, Serbian club Partizan, and AZ of the Netherlands. Astana were United's – and any English club's – first ever Kazakhstani opponents, and it would also be the first time they had played against AZ; their only previous meeting with Partizan came in the semi-finals of the 1965–66 European Cup, losing 2–0 in Belgrade before a 1–0 win at Old Trafford a week later.

United began their Europa League campaign with a 1–0 win over Astana at Old Trafford on 19 September; Mason Greenwood scored the only goal of the game, the first of his professional career, cutting inside off the right wing to shoot through the legs of goalkeeper Nenad Erić and become Manchester United's youngest goalscorer in European football. United's second match, a goalless draw away to AZ, was played at Cars Jeans Stadion in The Hague as the roof had collapsed at AZ's AFAS Stadion. They then made the trip to Belgrade on 24 October, and came away with a 1–0 win thanks to an Anthony Martial penalty.

Martial was on the scoresheet again in the reverse fixture at Old Trafford on 7 November, his goal coming between efforts from Greenwood and Rashford. The 3–0 win meant United could no longer be caught by third-placed Partizan in the group standings, confirming their qualification for the knockout phase. United fielded a team with an average age of 22 years and 26 days in a 2–1 away defeat to the already-eliminated Astana. The match saw three debutants starting and another three coming on as substitutes. Jesse Lingard captained the side for the first time in his career and scored the opening goal – his first of the season – in the 10th minute; however, a goal from Dmitri Shomko and an own goal by Di'Shon Bernard gave Astana the win. United sealed top spot in the group with a 4–0 victory at home to the already-qualified AZ. Greenwood scored the second and fourth goals, and the others were scored by Ashley Young and Juan Mata, who each scored their first goals of the season; it was Young's first European goal since February 2012, which was scored in the Europa League against another Dutch side, Ajax. It was also United's biggest European victory since the 4–0 Europa League win against yet another Dutch club Feyenoord in November 2016, when they went on to win the tournament.

Date	Opponents	H / A	Result F–A	Scorers	Attendance	Group position
19 September 2019	Astana	H	1–0	Greenwood 73'	50,783	1st
3 October 2019	AZ	A	0–0		13,863	2nd
24 October 2019	Partizan	A	1–0	Martial 43' (pen.)	25,627	1st
7 November 2019	Partizan	H	3–0	Greenwood 22', Martial 33', Rashford 49'	62,955	1st
28 November 2019	Astana	A	1–2	Lingard 10'	28,949	1st
12 December 2019	AZ	H	4–0	Young 53', Greenwood (2) 58', 64', Mata 62' (pen.)	65,773	1st

Pos	Team	Pld	W	D	L	GF	GA	GD	Pts	Qualification
1	(England) Manchester United	6	4	1	1	10	2	+8	13	Advance to knockout phase
2	(Netherlands) AZ	6	2	3	1	15	8	+7	9	Advance to knockout phase
3	(Serbia) Partizan	6	2	2	2	10	10	0	8	
4	(Kazakhstan) Astana	6	1	0	5	4	19	−15	3	

Source: UEFA
Rules for classification: Group stage tiebreakers

=== Knockout phase ===
Having qualified for the knockout phase as group winners, Manchester United were seeded for the round of 32 draw and paired with Belgian side Club Brugge, who had dropped down from the Champions League; it was their first meeting since the 2015–16 UEFA Champions League play-offs, when Manchester United won 7–1 on aggregate. After a 1–1 draw at Jan Breydel Stadium that saw Anthony Martial cancel out Emmanuel Dennis's opener, United won the return leg 5–0 to win 6–1 on aggregate; Odion Ighalo scored his first goal for the club, Fred scored his first goals of the season, and Scott McTominay scored his first European goal. The round of 16 draw took place on 28 February, with United paired with Austrian club LASK. United won the first leg 5–0. Due to the COVID-19 pandemic, the second leg was played nearly five months later, on 5 August; United went 1–0 down early in the second half, but Jesse Lingard equalised shortly afterwards, before Anthony Martial secured a 2–1 win with three minutes left. That gave United a 7–1 win on aggregate and a place in the quarter-finals.

As a further result of the pandemic, the quarter-finals, semi-finals and final of the competition were moved to four venues in the German state of North Rhine-Westphalia, with all matches to be played behind closed doors. The draw for the entire final stage was also performed at the same time on 10 July. The draw paired Manchester United with Danish side Copenhagen in the quarter-finals, and the match was goalless through the initial 90 minutes, before ultimately being decided by a Bruno Fernandes penalty five minutes into extra time. In the semi-finals, they would play against the winners of the match between Wolverhampton Wanderers and Sevilla, played the next day; Sevilla also won 1–0, setting up the semi-final to be played in Cologne on 16 August. United lost 2–1 despite taking the lead through a Bruno Fernandes penalty in the ninth minute.

Date	Round	Opponents	H / A	Result F–A	Scorers	Attendance
20 February 2020	Round of 32; First leg	Club Brugge	A	1–1	Martial 36'	27,006
27 February 2020	Round of 32; Second leg	Club Brugge	H	5–0	Fernandes 27' (pen.), Ighalo 34', McTominay 41', Fred (2) 82', 90+3'	70,397
12 March 2020	Round of 16; First leg	LASK	A	5–0	Ighalo 28', James 58', Mata 82', Greenwood 90+2', Pereira 90+3'	0 (Note: The match between LASK and Manchester United in Linz was played behind closed doors due to the COVID-19 pandemic in Austria.)
5 August 2020 (Note: All of the round of 16 second leg matches, originally scheduled to be played on 19 March 2020, were postponed to 5–6 August 2020 due to the COVID-19 pandemic in Europe.)	Round of 16; Second leg	LASK	H	2–1	Lingard 57', Martial 88'	0
10 August 2020	Quarter-finals	Copenhagen	N	1–0 (a.e.t.)	Fernandes 95' (pen.)	0
16 August 2020	Semi-finals	Sevilla	N	1–2	Fernandes 9' (pen.)	0

== Squad statistics ==
No.	Pos.	Name	League		FA Cup		League Cup		Europe		Total		Discipline	
No.	Pos.	Name	Apps	Goals	Apps	Goals	Apps	Goals	Apps	Goals	Apps	Goals	Yellow card	Red card
1	GK	(Spain) David de Gea	38	0	1	0	2	0	2	0	43	0	2	0
2	DF	(Sweden) Victor Lindelöf	35	1	5	0	3	0	3(1)	0	46(1)	1	6	0
3	DF	(Ivory Coast) Eric Bailly	1(3)	0	3	0	0	0	4	0	8(3)	0	2	0
4	DF	(England) Phil Jones	2	0	1	1	2	0	2(1)	0	7(1)	1	2	0
5	DF	(England) Harry Maguire (c) (Note: Following the transfer of Ashley Young to Inter Milan on 17 January 2020)	38	1	5	2	3	0	9	0	55	3	9	0
6	MF	(France) Paul Pogba	13(3)	1	0(2)	0	1	0	2(1)	0	16(6)	1	2	0
7	FW	(Chile) Alexis Sánchez	0	0	0	0	0	0	0	0	0	0	0	0
8	MF	(Spain) Juan Mata	8(11)	0	4	1	1(2)	0	8(3)	2	21(16)	3	1	0
9	FW	(France) Anthony Martial	31(1)	17	2(3)	1	2(2)	1	6(1)	4	41(7)	23	1	0
10	FW	(England) Marcus Rashford	31	17	1(3)	0	3	4	4(2)	1	39(5)	22	4	0
12	DF	(England) Chris Smalling	0	0	0	0	0	0	0	0	0	0	0	0
13	GK	(England) Lee Grant	0	0	0	0	0	0	1	0	1	0	0	0
14	MF	(England) Jesse Lingard	9(13)	1	3(1)	1	4(1)	0	4(5)	2	20(20)	4	5	0
15	MF	(Brazil) Andreas Pereira	18(7)	1	2(2)	0	3(2)	0	2(4)	1	25(15)	2	4	0
16	DF	(Argentina) Marcos Rojo	1(2)	0	0	0	2	0	4	0	7(2)	0	1	0
17	MF	(Brazil) Fred	23(6)	0	4(2)	0	4	0	8(1)	2	39(9)	2	12	0
18	DF	(England) Ashley Young (c) (Note: Until transfer to Inter Milan on 17 January 2020)	10(2)	0	1	0	1(1)	0	2(1)	1	14(4)	1	8	0
18	MF	(Portugal) Bruno Fernandes	14	8	3	1	—		4(1)	3	21(1)	12	3	0
20	DF	(Portugal) Diogo Dalot	1(3)	0	3(1)	1	0	0	3	0	7(4)	1	1	0
21	MF	(Wales) Daniel James	26(7)	3	3	0	2(2)	0	4(2)	1	35(11)	4	4	0
22	GK	(Argentina) Sergio Romero	0	0	5	0	3	0	9	0	17	0	0	0
23	DF	(England) Luke Shaw	20(4)	0	3	1	2	0	4	0	29(4)	1	8	0
24	DF	(Netherlands) Timothy Fosu-Mensah	2(1)	0	0(1)	0	0	0	1(1)	0	3(3)	0	1	0
25	FW	(Nigeria) Odion Ighalo	0(11)	0	2(1)	3	—		3(2)	2	5(14)	5	0	0
26	FW	(England) Mason Greenwood	12(19)	10	3(2)	1	4	1	7(2)	5	26(23)	17	0	0
28	MF	(England) Angel Gomes	0(2)	0	0	0	0(1)	0	3	0	3(3)	0	0	0
29	DF	(England) Aaron Wan-Bissaka	34(1)	0	2	0	4	0	5	0	45(1)	0	8	0
30	GK	(England) Nathan Bishop	0	0	0	0	—		0	0	0	0	0	0
31	MF	(Serbia) Nemanja Matić	18(3)	0	4(1)	0	2(1)	1	4(1)	0	28(6)	1	4	1
35	DF	(England) Demetri Mitchell	0	0	0	0	0	0	0	0	0	0	0	0
36	DF	(Italy) Matteo Darmian	0	0	0	0	0	0	0	0	0	0	0	0
37	MF	(England) James Garner	0(1)	0	0	0	0(1)	0	3(1)	0	3(3)	0	0	0
38	DF	(England) Axel Tuanzebe	2(3)	0	0	0	2	0	3	0	7(3)	0	0	0
39	MF	(Scotland) Scott McTominay	20(7)	4	2	0	1	0	5(2)	1	28(9)	5	4	0
40	GK	(Portugal) Joel Castro Pereira	0	0	0	0	0	0	0	0	0	0	0	0
41	DF	(England) Ethan Laird	0	0	0	0	0	0	1(1)	0	1(1)	0	1	0
44	FW	(Netherlands) Tahith Chong	0(3)	0	1(1)	0	1	0	2(4)	0	4(8)	0	0	0
47	MF	(Spain) Arnau Puigmal	0	0	0	0	0	0	0	0	0	0	0	0
49	FW	(England) D'Mani Mellor	0	0	0	0	0	0	0(1)	0	0(1)	0	0	0
51	GK	(Czech Republic) Matěj Kovář	0	0	0	0	0	0	0	0	0	0	0	0
52	DF	(England) Max Taylor	0	0	0	0	0	0	0	0	0	0	0	0
53	DF	(England) Brandon Williams	11(6)	1	3(3)	0	3(2)	0	8	0	25(11)	1	9	0
54	MF	(Northern Ireland) Ethan Galbraith	0	0	0	0	0	0	0(1)	0	0(1)	0	0	0
58	DF	(England) Di'Shon Bernard	0	0	0	0	0	0	1	0	1	0	0	0
59	FW	(Belgium) Largie Ramazani	0	0	0	0	0	0	0(1)	0	0(1)	0	0	0
63	MF	(Wales) Dylan Levitt	0	0	0	0	0	0	1	0	1	0	1	0
71	DF	(England) Teden Mengi	0	0	0	0	0	0	0(1)	0	0(1)	0	0	0
Own goals			—	1	—	0	—	1	—	0	—	2	—	—

Statistics accurate as of 16 August 2020.

== Transfers ==
=== In ===
Date	Pos.	Name	From	Fee	Ref.
12 June 2019	MF	(Wales) Daniel James	(Wales) Swansea City	Undisclosed (Note: Fee reported as £15 million)	
29 June 2019	DF	(England) Aaron Wan-Bissaka	(England) Crystal Palace	Undisclosed (Note: Fee reported as £45 million, rising to £50 million in add-ons.)	
5 August 2019	DF	(England) Harry Maguire	(England) Leicester City	Undisclosed (Note: Fee reported as £80 million)	
30 January 2020	MF	(Portugal) Bruno Fernandes	(Portugal) Sporting CP	Undisclosed (Note: Fee reported as £47 million, rising to £67.7 million in add-ons.)	
31 January 2020	GK	(England) Nathan Bishop	(England) Southend United	Undisclosed	

=== Out ===
Date	Pos.	Name	To	Fee	Ref.
30 June 2019	MF	(Spain) Ander Herrera	Released (Note: Joined Paris Saint-Germain on 4 July 2019)		
30 June 2019	DF	(Ecuador) Antonio Valencia	(Ecuador) LDU Quito	Free	
30 June 2019	DF	(Wales) Regan Poole	Milton Keynes Dons	Free	
30 June 2019	FW	(England) Zak Dearnley	Released (Note: Joined New Mills on 19 November 2019)		
30 June 2019	MF	(England) Tom Sang	Released (Note: Joined Cardiff City on 13 August 2019)		
30 June 2019	MF	(England) Callum Whelan	Watford	Free	
30 June 2019	MF	(England) Matty Willock	Gillingham	Free	
30 June 2019	FW	(England) James Wilson	(Scotland) Aberdeen	Free	
30 June 2019	DF	(United States) Matthew Olosunde	Rotherham United	Free	
30 June 2019	DF	(England) Tyrell Warren	Released (Note: Joined Salford City on 1 September 2019)		
30 June 2019	MF	(Antigua and Barbuda) DJ Buffonge	(Italy) Spezia	Free	
30 June 2019	MF	(England) Callum Gribbin	Released (Note: Joined Sheffield United on 19 September 2019)		
30 June 2019	FW	(Netherlands) Millen Baars	Released (Note: Joined AZ Alkmaar on 13 February 2020)		
30 June 2019	FW	(England) Joshua Bohui	(Netherlands) NAC Breda	Free	
30 June 2019	GK	(England) James Thompson	Released		
27 July 2019	FW	(Switzerland) Nishan Burkart	(Germany) Freiburg	Undisclosed	
8 August 2019	FW	(Belgium) Romelu Lukaku	(Italy) Inter Milan	Undisclosed (Note: Fee reported as £74 million)	
2 September 2019	DF	(Italy) Matteo Darmian	(Italy) Parma	Undisclosed (Note: Fee reported as £3.6 million)	
2 September 2019	DF	(Republic of Ireland) Lee O'Connor	(Scotland) Celtic	Undisclosed	
17 January 2020	DF	(England) Ashley Young	(Italy) Inter Milan	Undisclosed (Note: Fee reported as £1.28 million)	

=== Loan in ===
Date from	Date to	Pos.	Name	From	Ref
1 February 2020	27 January 2021 (Note: Originally until 31 May 2020; loan extended on 1 June 2020.)	FW	(Nigeria) Odion Ighalo	(China) Shanghai Shenhua	

=== Loan out ===
Date from	Date to	Pos.	Name	To	Ref.
8 July 2019	30 June 2020	GK	(Republic of Ireland) Kieran O'Hara	(England) Burton Albion	
8 July 2019	31 July 2020 (Note: Originally until 30 June 2020; loan extended on 29 June 2020.)	GK	(England) Dean Henderson	(England) Sheffield United	
5 August 2019	5 January 2020	GK	(Slovakia) Alex Fojtíček	(England) Stalybridge Celtic	
9 August 2019	30 September 2019	GK	(England) Jacob Carney	(England) Stocksbridge Park Steels	
12 August 2019	24 January 2020	DF	(England) George Tanner	(England) Morecambe	
13 August 2019	31 December 2019	MF	(England) Aidan Barlow	(Norway) Tromsø	
13 August 2019	30 June 2020	GK	(Portugal) Joel Castro Pereira	(Scotland) Hearts	
16 August 2019	3 January 2020	MF	(Scotland) Ethan Hamilton	(England) Southend United	
29 August 2019	2 August 2020 (Note: Originally until 30 June 2020; loan extended on 2 August 2020.)	FW	(Chile) Alexis Sánchez	(Italy) Inter Milan	
30 August 2019	2 August 2020	DF	(England) Chris Smalling	(Italy) Roma	
2 September 2019	9 January 2020	DF	(England) Cameron Borthwick-Jackson	(England) Tranmere Rovers	
2 December 2019	30 June 2020	GK	(England) Jacob Carney	(England) Stocksbridge Park Steels	
6 January 2020	30 June 2020	MF	(Scotland) Ethan Hamilton	(England) Bolton Wanderers	
10 January 2020	30 June 2020	GK	(Slovakia) Alex Fojtíček	(England) Stalybridge Celtic	
10 January 2020	30 June 2020	DF	(England) Max Taylor	(England) Stalybridge Celtic	
24 January 2020	30 June 2020	DF	(England) Cameron Borthwick-Jackson	(England) Oldham Athletic	
24 January 2020	30 June 2020	DF	(England) George Tanner	(England) Salford City	
30 January 2020	30 June 2020	DF	(Argentina) Marcos Rojo	(Argentina) Estudiantes LP	
