= Rick Hemmink =

Dutch footballer

Personal information
- Date of birth: 14 February 1993 (age 33)
- Place of birth: Vriezenveen, Netherlands
- Height: 1.84 m (6 ft 1/2 in)
- Position: Attacking midfielder

Team information
- Current team: VV Voorwaarts

Youth career
- VV Voorwaarts
- Twente

Senior career*
Years	Team	Apps	(Gls)
2013–2014	Jong Twente	5	(0)
2014–2016	Heracles	0	(0)
2016–2017	Achilles '29	14	(1)
2017–2022	HHC	117	(33)
2022–2025	Excelsior '31	64	(9)
2025–	Voorwaarts		
Total		200	(43)
- * Club domestic league appearances and goals as of 15 January 2026

Rick Hemmink (born 14 February 1993) is a Dutch footballer who plays as a midfielder for VV Voorwaarts from Westerhaar.

== Club career ==
He made his professional debut in the Eerste Divisie for Jong Twente on 30 November 2013 in a game against Sparta Rotterdam. Injuries cut short his professional career and he joined HHC while working at his father's farm. With former Achilles '29 teammate Coen Gortemaker he also started his own sneaker brand.

He was snapped up by Excelsior '31 in summer 2022.
