= Daley Sinkgraven =

Dutch footballer (born 1995)

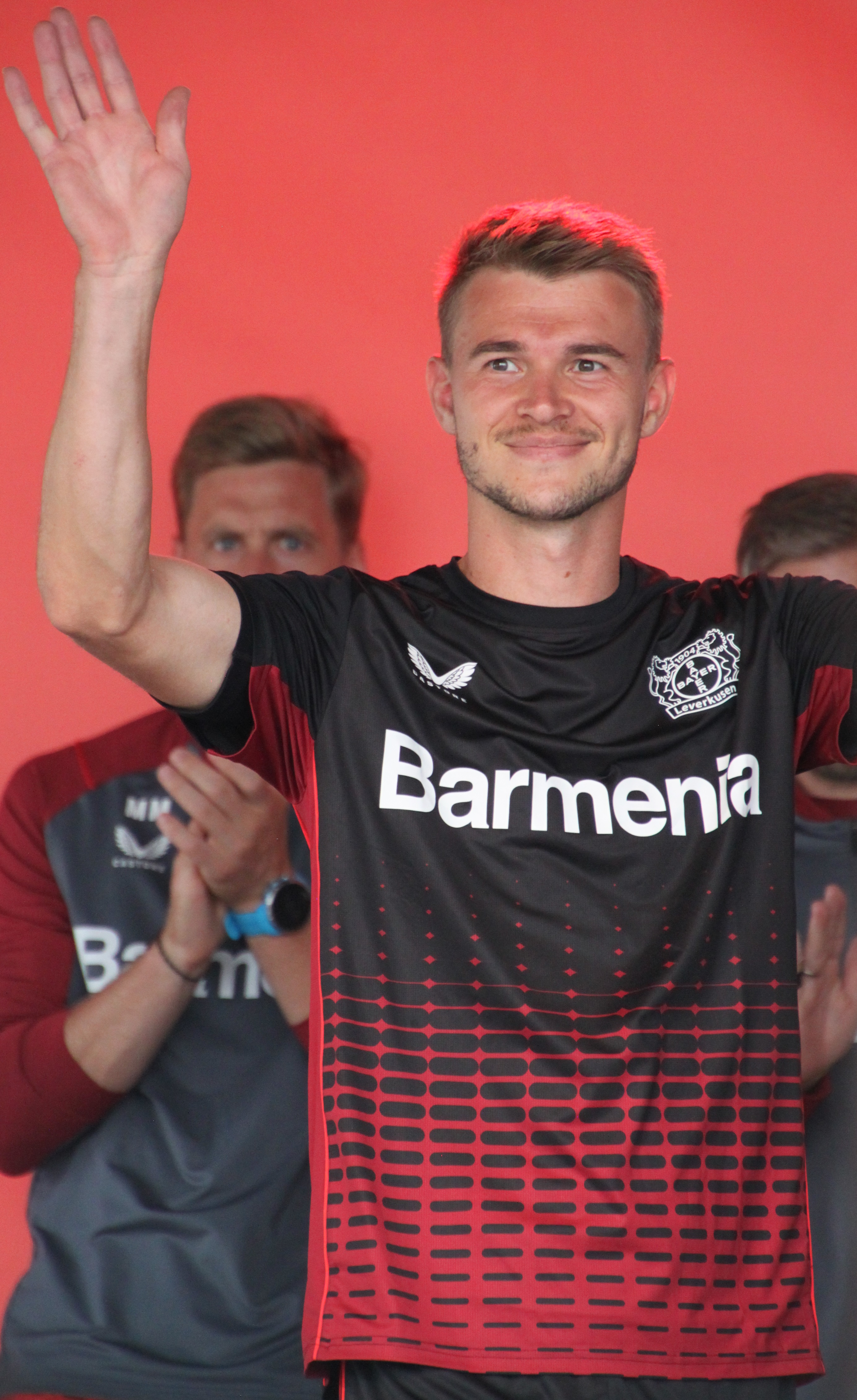
- Sinkgraven with Bayer Leverkusen in 2022

Personal information
- Date of birth: 4 July 1995 (age 31)
- Place of birth: Assen, Netherlands
- Height: 1.79 m (5 ft 10 in)
- Positions: Left-back; midfielder

Team information
- Current team: Fortuna Sittard
- Number: 24

Youth career
- 2002–2008: MVV Alcides
- 2008–2013: Heerenveen

Senior career*
Years	Team	Apps	(Gls)
2013–2015	Heerenveen	35	(4)
2015–2019	Ajax	63	(1)
2015–2019	Jong Ajax	9	(1)
2019–2023	Bayer Leverkusen	59	(0)
2023–2025	Las Palmas	12	(0)
2025–2026	Fortuna Sittard	2	(0)
2026–	Fortuna Sittard	1	(0)

International career
2012	Netherlands U17	3	(0)
2012	Netherlands U18	2	(0)
2014	Netherlands U19	1	(0)
2014–2015	Netherlands U21	5	(0)
- * Club domestic league appearances and goals as of 10 October 2026

Daley Sinkgraven (born 4 July 1995) is a Dutch professional footballer who plays as a left-back for Eredivisie club Fortuna Sittard.

== Club career ==
=== Heerenveen ===
Sinkgraven started playing football with MVV Alcides from his hometown Meppel. He ended up in the youth academy of SC Heerenveen. Sinkgraven had a breakthrough season in 2013–14 playing 17 games while starting five of them. He made his debut in the 2–2 draw against Roda JC Kerkrade on 18 January 2014 by replacing Hakim Ziyech. On 28 March 2014, he extended his contract until the summer of 2017. On 22 November 2014, he scored an own goal in a 4–1 away loss to Ajax. Sinkgraven's great performances for Heerenveen caught the eye of many giant English clubs. Chelsea, Liverpool and Manchester United were all very interested in buying the teenage Sinkgraven.

=== Ajax ===
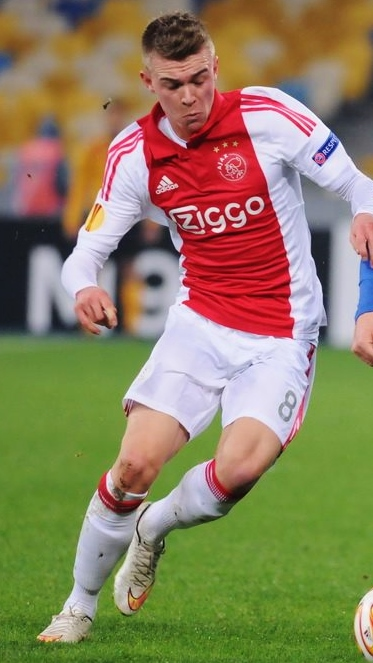
Sinkgraven playing for Ajax in 2015

On 30 January 2015, after excellent performances for SC Heerenveen, it was announced that Sinkgraven had joined Ajax for a fee of €7 million at the age of 19 years old, making him the club's most expensive acquisition since Miralem Sulejmani, who had also made the transfer to Ajax from Heerenveen. He signed a five-and-a-half-year contract with the club and was given the number 8 shirt previously worn by Lerin Duarte, who was sent on a six-month loan spell to Heerenveen in return. He made his debut for the first team of Ajax in the starting lineup on 5 February 2015 in a 1–0 home loss to AZ.

Sinkgraven helped guide Ajax to the final of the 2016–17 Europa League where they lost to Manchester United. Sinkgraven was also a part of the Ajax team that won the Dutch Eredivisie title and the Dutch KNVB Cup during the 2018–19 season. In that same season, Sinkgraven also helped Ajax reach the semi-finals of the Champions League where they lost to Tottenham, after knocking out Real Madrid and Juventus in the previous rounds. Sinkgraven was hampered by injuries for a lot of the time, while at Ajax. In his four and a half years at Ajax, he missed 101 games through injury and he was out injured for a total of 738 days.

=== Bayer Leverkusen ===
On 17 June 2019, Sinkgraven signed for Bayer Leverkusen on a four-year contract, to rejoin his former Ajax coach Peter Bosz. On 22 May 2023, Leverkusen announced that it would not be renewing Sinkgraven's contract, making the player a free agent at the end of the season.

=== Las Palmas ===
On 11 July 2023, recently promoted La Liga side Las Palmas announced the signing of Sinkgraven on a two-year contract. On 2 February 2025, after rarely playing, he terminated his contract with the club by mutual consent.

=== Fortuna Sittard ===
On 3 February 2025, Sinkgraven returned to the Netherlands and signed a one-and-a-half-year contract with Fortuna Sittard. He suffered a knee injury and ended up playing only 2 league games for Fortuna before his contract expired.

After spending the first 7 games of the 2026–27 season as a free agent, on 9 October 2026 Sinkgraven signed a new contract with Fortuna Sittard until the end of the season.

== International career ==
Sinkgraven has been capped at various youth levels, notably representing the Dutch U21, U19 teams. He has received call-ups for the senior national team but has not been capped as of July 2021.

== Personal life ==
Sinkgraven is the son of Dutch football coach Harry Sinkgraven.

== Career statistics ==
=== Club ===
As of match played 8 August 2025.

Club	Season	League			Cup		Continental (Note: Includes UEFA Champions League and UEFA Europa League matches)		Other (Note: Includes Johan Cruyff Shield and Eredivisie play-off matches)		Total	
Club	Season	Division	Apps	Goals	Apps	Goals	Apps	Goals	Apps	Goals	Apps	Goals
Heerenveen	2013–14	Eredivisie	15	0	0	0	—		2	0	17	0
Heerenveen	2014–15	Eredivisie	20	4	1	0	—		—		21	4
Heerenveen	Total		35	4	1	0	0	0	2	0	38	4
Ajax	2014–15	Eredivisie	10	0	0	0	4	0	—		14	0
Ajax	2015–16	Eredivisie	16	0	2	0	6	0	—		24	0
Ajax	2016–17	Eredivisie	24	1	1	0	7	0	—		32	1
Ajax	2017–18	Eredivisie	4	0	1	0	0	0	—		5	0
Ajax	2018–19	Eredivisie	9	0	0	0	2	0	—		11	0
Ajax	Total		63	1	4	0	19	0	0	0	86	1
Jong Ajax	2015–16	Eerste Divisie	5	1	—		—		—		5	1
Jong Ajax	2017–18	Eerste Divisie	4	0	—		—		—		4	0
Jong Ajax	Total		9	1	0	0	0	0	0	0	9	1
Bayer Leverkusen	2019–20	Bundesliga	13	0	2	0	6	0	—		21	0
Bayer Leverkusen	2020–21	Bundesliga	22	0	1	0	4	0	—		27	0
Bayer Leverkusen	2021–22	Bundesliga	12	0	2	0	4	0	—		18	0
Bayer Leverkusen	2022–23	Bundesliga	12	0	0	0	0	0	—		12	0
Bayer Leverkusen	Total		59	0	5	0	14	0	0	0	78	0
Las Palmas	2023–24	La Liga	10	0	2	0	—		—		12	0
Las Palmas	2024–25	La Liga	2	0	1	0	—		—		3	0
Las Palmas	Total		12	0	3	0	—		—		15	0
Fortuna Sittard	2024–25	Eredivisie	2	0	0	0	—		—		2	0
Career total			180	6	13	0	33	0	2	0	228	6

== Honours ==
=== Club ===
Ajax

- Eredivisie: 2018–19
- KNVB Cup: 2018–19
- UEFA Europa League runner-up: 2016–17
