= List of Dutch football transfers summer 2016 =

This is a list of transfers in Dutch football for the 2016 Summer transfer window. Only confirmed moves featuring an Eredivisie side are listed.

The summer transfer window will open on July 1, 2016, and will close on August 31, 2016. Deals may be signed at any given moment in the season, but the actual transfer may only take place during the transfer window. Unattached players may sign at any moment.

Date	Name	Moving from	Moving to	Fee
4 February 2016^{1}	(Morocco) Youness Mokhtar	(Saudi Arabia) Al-Nassr	(Netherlands) PEC Zwolle	Free transfer
12 February 2016^{1}	(Denmark) Dario Dumić	(Denmark) Brøndby IF	(Netherlands) NEC	Free transfer
23 March 2016^{1}	(Netherlands) Daryl van Mieghem	(Netherlands) Excelsior	(Netherlands) Heracles Almelo	Free transfer
4 April 2016^{1}	(Netherlands) Rens van Eijden	(Netherlands) NEC	(Netherlands) AZ	Free transfer
5 April 2016^{1}	(Netherlands) Stijn Spierings	(Netherlands) AZ	(Netherlands) Sparta Rotterdam	Free transfer
5 May 2016^{1}	(Australia) Craig Goodwin	(Australia) Adelaide United	(Netherlands) Sparta Rotterdam	Free transfer
8 May 2016	(Netherlands) Rick Kruys	(Netherlands) Excelsior	Unattached	Retired
12 May 2016^{1}	(Netherlands) Lex Immers	(Netherlands) Feyenoord	(Wales) Cardiff City	Undisclosed
12 May 2016^{1}	(Netherlands) Navarone Foor	(Netherlands) NEC	(Netherlands) Vitesse	Free transfer
13 May 2016^{1}	(Netherlands) Jordy Bruijn	(Netherlands) Ajax	(Netherlands) Heerenveen	Free transfer
17 May 2016^{1}	(Netherlands) Michael de Leeuw	(Netherlands) FC Groningen	(United States) Chicago Fire	Free transfer
17 May 2016^{1}	(Netherlands) Roel Brouwers	(Germany) Borussia Mönchengladbach	(Netherlands) Roda JC	Free transfer
19 May 2016^{1}	(Netherlands) Jeffry Fortes	(Netherlands) FC Dordrecht	(Netherlands) Excelsior	Free transfer
21 May 2016^{1}	(Netherlands) Anass Achahbar	(Netherlands) Feyenoord	(Netherlands) PEC Zwolle	€300,000
21 May 2016^{1}	(Netherlands) Zakaria El Azzouzi	(Netherlands) Ajax	(Netherlands) Sparta Rotterdam	Loan
23 May 2016^{1}	(Netherlands) Brandley Kuwas	(Netherlands) Excelsior	(Netherlands) Heracles Almelo	Free transfer
23 May 2016^{1}	(Netherlands) Calvin Verdonk	(Netherlands) Feyenoord	(Netherlands) PEC Zwolle	Loan
25 May 2016	(Netherlands) Bas Sibum	(Netherlands) Heracles Almelo	Unattached	Retired
25 May 2016	(Netherlands) Coen Gortemaker	(Netherlands) Heracles Almelo	(Netherlands) Achilles '29	Free transfer
25 May 2016	(Netherlands) Daan Bovenberg	(Netherlands) Excelsior	Unattached	Retired
25 May 2016^{1}	(Sweden) Rasmus Lindgren	(Netherlands) FC Groningen	(Sweden) BK Häcken	Free transfer
26 May 2016^{1}	(Netherlands) Robin Pröpper	(Netherlands) De Graafschap	(Netherlands) Heracles Almelo	Free transfer
26 May 2016^{1}	(Netherlands) Ryan Koolwijk	(Slovakia) AS Trenčín	(Netherlands) Excelsior	Free transfer
27 May 2016^{1}	(Denmark) Viktor Fischer	(Netherlands) Ajax	(England) Middlesbrough	€5,000,000
27 May 2016^{1}	(Netherlands) Ted van de Pavert	(Netherlands) De Graafschap	(Netherlands) PEC Zwolle	Free transfer
28 May 2016^{1}	(Netherlands) Lesly de Sa	(Netherlands) Ajax	(Slovakia) Slovan Bratislava	Free transfer
29 May 2016^{1}	(Netherlands) Bart Vriends	(Netherlands) Go Ahead Eagles	(Netherlands) Sparta Rotterdam	Free transfer
30 May 2016^{1}	(Netherlands) Lorenzo Burnet	(Netherlands) FC Groningen	(Slovakia) Slovan Bratislava	Free transfer
30 May 2016^{1}	(Netherlands) Mats Seuntjens	(Netherlands) NAC Breda	(Netherlands) AZ	Free transfer
1 June 2016^{1}	(Netherlands) Tom van Weert	(Netherlands) Excelsior	(Netherlands) FC Groningen	Free transfer
2 June 2016^{1}	(Spain) Iván Calero	(England) Derby County	(Netherlands) Sparta Rotterdam	Free transfer
3 June 2016^{1}	(Netherlands) Robert Braber	(Netherlands) Willem II	(Netherlands) Helmond Sport	Free transfer
6 June 2016^{1}	(Netherlands) Ruud Boymans	(Netherlands) FC Utrecht	(United Arab Emirates) Al-Shabab	Undisclosed
7 June 2016^{1}	(Norway) Ruben Yttergård Jenssen	(Germany) FC Kaiserslautern	(Netherlands) FC Groningen	Free transfer
7 June 2016^{1}	(France) Florian Pinteaux	(France) Châteauroux	(Netherlands) Sparta Rotterdam	Undisclosed
9 June 2016^{1}	(Belgium) Timothy Derijck	(Netherlands) ADO Den Haag	(Belgium) Zulte Waregem	Free transfer
9 June 2016^{1}	(Brazil) Nathan	(England) Chelsea	(Netherlands) Vitesse	Loan
9 June 2016^{1}	(Netherlands) Ruben Ligeon	(Netherlands) Ajax	(Slovakia) Slovan Bratislava	Free transfer
9 June 2016^{1}	(Paraguay) Celso Ortiz	(Netherlands) AZ	(Mexico) Monterrey	Undisclosed
10 June 2016^{1}	(Ecuador) Renato Ibarra	(Netherlands) Vitesse	(Mexico) América	€1,800,000
10 June 2016^{1}	(Netherlands) Kevin Brands	(Netherlands) NAC Breda	(Netherlands) Go Ahead Eagles	Free transfer
13 June 2016^{1}	(Netherlands) Joey Suk	(Netherlands) NAC Breda	(Netherlands) Go Ahead Eagles	Free transfer
14 June 2016^{1}	(Netherlands) Sander Fischer	(Netherlands) Excelsior	(Netherlands) Go Ahead Eagles	Free transfer
15 June 2016^{1}	(Netherlands) Adil Auassar	(Netherlands) Excelsior	(Netherlands) Roda JC	Free transfer
16 June 2016^{1}	(Netherlands) Mikhail Rosheuvel	(Netherlands) SC Cambuur	(Netherlands) Roda JC	Free transfer
17 June 2016^{1}	(Colombia) Mateo Cassierra	(Colombia) Deportivo Cali	(Netherlands) Ajax	€5,500,000
17 June 2016^{1}	(Slovenia) Martin Milec	(Belgium) Standard Liège	(Netherlands) Roda JC	Loan
17 June 2016^{1}	(Germany) Frederic Ananou	(Germany) FC Köln	(Netherlands) Roda JC	Free transfer
17 June 2016^{1}	(Denmark) Nicolai Jørgensen	(Denmark) FC Copenhagen	(Netherlands) Feyenoord	€3,500,000
18 June 2016^{1}	(Denmark) Martin Hansen	(Netherlands) ADO Den Haag	(Germany) FC Ingolstadt 04	€950,000
19 June 2016^{1}	(Netherlands) Thom Haye	(Netherlands) AZ	(Netherlands) Willem II	Free transfer
21 June 2016^{1}	(Colombia) Davinson Sánchez	(Colombia) Atlético Nacional	(Netherlands) Ajax	€5,000,000
21 June 2016^{1}	(Netherlands) Robin Buwalda	(Netherlands) ADO Den Haag	(Netherlands) NEC	Free transfer
21 June 2016^{1}	(Netherlands) Wouter van der Steen	(Netherlands) Helmond Sport	(Netherlands) Heerenveen	Free transfer
21 June 2016^{1}	(Netherlands) Bart van Hintum	(Netherlands) PEC Zwolle	(Turkey) Gaziantepspor	Free transfer
21 June 2016^{1}	(Netherlands) Gino Bosz	(Netherlands) Heracles Almelo	(Netherlands) SC Cambuur	Free transfer
21 June 2016^{1}	(Estonia) Henrik Ojamaa	(Austria) Wacker Innsbruck	(Netherlands) Go Ahead Eagles	Free transfer
22 June 2016^{1}	(Iran) Reza Ghoochannejhad	(England) Charlton Athletic	(Netherlands) Heerenveen	Free transfer
22 June 2016^{1}	(Belgium) Robbie Haemhouts	(Netherlands) Willem II	(Netherlands) NAC Breda	Free transfer
23 June 2016^{1}	(Germany) Dani Schahin	(Germany) Mainz 05	(Netherlands) Roda JC	Undisclosed
23 June 2016^{1}	(Netherlands) Christian Kum	(Netherlands) FC Utrecht	(Netherlands) Roda JC	Free transfer
24 June 2016^{1}	(England) Lewis Baker	(England) Chelsea	(Netherlands) Vitesse	Loan
24 June 2016^{1}	(Netherlands) Rydell Poepon	(Netherlands) Roda JC	(Turkey) Boluspor	Free transfer
24 June 2016^{1}	(Netherlands) Giovanni Korte	(Netherlands) ADO Den Haag	(Netherlands) NAC Breda	Free transfer
24 June 2016^{1}	(Netherlands) Segun Owobowale	(Netherlands) ADO Den Haag	(Netherlands) NEC	Free transfer
26 June 2016^{1}	(Netherlands) Jeffrey Bruma	(Netherlands) PSV	(Germany) VfL Wolfsburg	€11,500,000
26 June 2016^{1}	(Belgium) Maecky Ngombo	(Netherlands) Roda JC	(Germany) Fortuna Düsseldorf	Free transfer
27 June 2016^{1}	(Netherlands) Tom Overtoom	(Netherlands) Excelsior	(Netherlands) Almere City	Free transfer
27 June 2016^{1}	(Netherlands) Johan Voskamp	(Netherlands) Sparta Rotterdam	(Netherlands) RKC Waalwijk	Free transfer
28 June 2016^{1}	(Belgium) Bart Biemans	(Netherlands) Roda JC	(Netherlands) FC Den Bosch	Free transfer
28 June 2016^{1}	(Netherlands) Boban Lazić	(Netherlands) PEC Zwolle	(Netherlands) FC Oss	Free transfer
29 June 2016^{1}	(Netherlands) Joey van den Berg	(Netherlands) Heerenveen	(England) Reading	Free transfer
29 June 2016^{1}	(Netherlands) Jeff Stans	(Netherlands) Excelsior	(Netherlands) NAC Breda	Free transfer
30 June 2016^{1}	(Netherlands) Ashraf El Mahdioui	(Netherlands) Ajax	(Netherlands) ADO Den Haag	Free transfer
30 June 2016^{1}	(Curaçao) Rigino Cicilia	(Netherlands) Roda JC	(England) Port Vale	Free transfer
30 June 2016^{1}	(Germany) Julian von Haacke	(Germany) Werder Bremen	(Netherlands) NEC	€50,000
1 July 2016	(Netherlands) David Mendes da Silva	(Greece) Panathinaikos	(Netherlands) Sparta Rotterdam	Free transfer
2 July 2016	(Australia) Tomi Juric	(Netherlands) Roda JC	(Switzerland) FC Luzern	Free transfer
3 July 2016	(Finland) Thomas Lam	(Netherlands) PEC Zwolle	(England) Nottingham Forest	Free transfer
4 July 2016	(Belgium) Martijn Monteyne	(Netherlands) Roda JC	(Belgium) Roeselare	Free transfer
5 July 2016	(Argentina) José San Román	(Argentina) Huracán	(Netherlands) ADO Den Haag	Free transfer
5 July 2016	(Denmark) Lucas Andersen	(Netherlands) Ajax	(Switzerland) Grasshoppers	€1,500,000
6 July 2016	(Netherlands) Mike van der Hoorn	(Netherlands) Ajax	(Wales) Swansea City	€2,500,000
6 July 2016	(Netherlands) Wout Weghorst	(Netherlands) Heracles Almelo	(Netherlands) AZ	€1,500,000
6 July 2016	(Chile) Felipe Gutiérrez	(Netherlands) FC Twente	(Spain) Real Betis	€3,500,000
6 July 2016	(Netherlands) Kevin Diks	(Netherlands) Vitesse	(Italy) Fiorentina	€3,000,000
7 July 2016	(Iceland) Hjörtur Hermannsson	(Netherlands) PSV	(Denmark) Brøndby IF	€300,000
8 July 2016	(Australia) Brad Jones	(Netherlands) NEC	(Netherlands) Feyenoord	Free transfer
8 July 2016	(Netherlands) Piet Velthuizen	(Netherlands) Vitesse	(Israel) Hapoel Haifa	Free transfer
8 July 2016	(Netherlands) Terell Ondaan	(Netherlands) Willem II	(Netherlands) Excelsior	Free transfer
8 July 2016	(Denmark) David Boysen	(Denmark) Brøndby IF	(Netherlands) Roda JC	€300,000
11 July 2016	(Netherlands) Anouar Hadouir	(Morocco) Moghreb Tétouan	(Netherlands) Excelsior	Free transfer
11 July 2016	(Germany) Daniel Schwaab	(Germany) VfB Stuttgart	(Netherlands) PSV	Free transfer
12 July 2016	(Cyprus) Nestoras Mytidis	(Cyprus) AEK Larnaca	(Netherlands) Roda JC	Undisclosed
12 July 2016	(Belgium) Dylan Seys	(Belgium) Club Brugge	(Netherlands) FC Twente	Loan
12 July 2016	(Netherlands) Vincent Janssen	(Netherlands) AZ	(England) Tottenham Hotspur	€22,100,000
12 July 2016	(Netherlands) Jerson Cabral	(Netherlands) FC Twente	(France) SC Bastia	Free transfer
12 July 2016	(Germany) Reagy Ofosu	(Austria) SV Grödig	(Netherlands) NEC	Free transfer
12 July 2016	(Venezuela) Christian Santos	(Netherlands) NEC	(Spain) Deportivo Alavés	Free transfer
13 July 2016	(Nigeria) Abdul Ajagun	(Greece) Panathinaikos	(Netherlands) Roda JC	Loan
14 July 2016	(Germany) Stefan Thesker	(Germany) Greuther Fürth	(Netherlands) FC Twente	Free transfer
14 July 2016	(Germany) Heiko Westermann	(Spain) Real Betis	(Netherlands) Ajax	Free transfer
14 July 2016	(Germany) Thomas Meißner	(Germany) MSV Duisburg	(Netherlands) ADO Den Haag	Free transfer
14 July 2016	(Morocco) Hachim Mastour	(Italy) AC Milan	(Netherlands) PEC Zwolle	Loan
15 July 2016	(Iceland) Hannes Thór Halldórsson	(Netherlands) NEC	(Denmark) Randers FC	Undisclosed
15 July 2016	(Belgium) Yves De Winter	(Belgium) Sint-Truiden	(Netherlands) Roda JC	Free transfer
15 July 2016	(Netherlands) Hidde Jurjus	(Netherlands) De Graafschap	(Netherlands) PSV	€500,000
15 July 2016	(Nigeria) Fred Friday	(Norway) Lillestrøm	(Netherlands) AZ	€1,500,000
16 July 2016	(Netherlands) Nick van der Velden	(Netherlands) Willem II	(Scotland) Dundee United	Free transfer
18 July 2016	(Germany) Michael Heinloth	(Germany) SC Paderborn	(Netherlands) NEC	Free transfer
19 July 2016	(Australia) Stefan Mauk	(Australia) Adelaide United	(Netherlands) NEC	€275,000
19 July 2016	(Poland) Filip Bednarek	(Netherlands) FC Utrecht	(Netherlands) De Graafschap	Free transfer
19 July 2016	(Netherlands) Jordy Buijs	(Netherlands) Roda JC	(Romania) Pandurii Târgu Jiu	Free transfer
20 July 2016	(Angola) Fredy Ribeiro	(Angola) Recreativo do Libolo	(Netherlands) Excelsior	Undisclosed
20 July 2016	(Netherlands) Ricardo van Rhijn	(Netherlands) Ajax	(Belgium) Club Brugge	€1,800,000
21 July 2016	(Lithuania) Ernestas Šetkus	(Turkey) Sivasspor	(Netherlands) ADO Den Haag	Free transfer
21 July 2016	(Poland) Kamil Miazek	(Netherlands) Feyenoord	(Poland) Chojniczanka Chojnice	Free transfer
21 July 2016	(Ghana) Yaw Yeboah	(England) Manchester City	(Netherlands) FC Twente	Loan
22 July 2016	(Netherlands) Michiel Hemmen	(Netherlands) Excelsior	(Netherlands) SC Cambuur	Free transfer
22 July 2016	(Belgium) Anthony Limbombe	(Netherlands) NEC	(Belgium) Club Brugge	€2,500,000
23 July 2016	(Turkey) Enes Ünal	(England) Manchester City	(Netherlands) FC Twente	Loan
25 July 2016	(Netherlands) Stijn Schaars	(Netherlands) PSV	(Netherlands) Heerenveen	Free transfer
25 July 2016	(Ghana) Quincy Owusu-Abeyie	Unattached	(Netherlands) NEC	Free transfer
27 July 2016	(Denmark) Michael Tørnes	(Denmark) Odense BK	(Netherlands) Vitesse	Free transfer
27 July 2016	(Denmark) Thomas Kristensen	(Netherlands) ADO Den Haag	(Australia) Brisbane Roar	Free transfer
27 July 2016	(Italy) Nicolò Pozzebon	(Italy) Juventus	(Netherlands) FC Groningen	Loan
28 July 2016	(France) Kévin Mayi	(France) Gazélec Ajaccio	(Netherlands) NEC	€150,000
28 July 2016	(Germany) Tom Trybull	(Germany) Greuther Fürth	(Netherlands) ADO Den Haag	Free transfer
28 July 2016	(Denmark) David Jensen	(Denmark) FC Nordsjælland	(Netherlands) FC Utrecht	Undisclosed
28 July 2016	(Netherlands) Ricky van Wolfswinkel	(England) Norwich City	(Netherlands) Vitesse	€600,000
30 July 2016	(Slovenia) Dejan Trajkovski	(Slovenia) Domžale	(Netherlands) FC Twente	Loan
1 August 2016	(Netherlands) Vito Wormgoor	(Netherlands) ADO Den Haag	(Norway) Aalesunds FK	Free transfer
1 August 2016	(Netherlands) Steven Berghuis	(England) Watford	(Netherlands) Feyenoord	Loan
1 August 2016	(Poland) Arkadiusz Milik	(Netherlands) Ajax	(Italy) Napoli	€32,000,000
1 August 2016	(Bosnia and Herzegovina) Samir Memišević	(Bosnia and Herzegovina) Radnik Bijeljina	(Netherlands) FC Groningen	Undisclosed
2 August 2016	(Netherlands) Vincent Vermeij	(Netherlands) De Graafschap	(Netherlands) Heracles Almelo	€500,000
3 August 2016	(Netherlands) Timo Letschert	(Netherlands) FC Utrecht	(Italy) Sassuolo	€3,500,000
3 August 2016	(France) Joris Delle	(France) Lens	(Netherlands) NEC	Free transfer
4 August 2016	(Brazil) Arghus	(Portugal) Sporting Braga	(Netherlands) Excelsior	Loan
5 August 2016	(Netherlands) Indy Groothuizen	(Netherlands) Ajax	(Denmark) FC Nordsjælland	Loan
6 August 2016	(Netherlands) Guus Hupperts	(Netherlands) AZ	(Belgium) SC Lokeren	Undisclosed
15 August 2016	(Netherlands) Menno Koch	(Netherlands) PSV	(Netherlands) FC Utrecht	Loan
16 August 2016	(Norway) Torgeir Børven	(Netherlands) FC Twente	(Norway) SK Brann	Loan
16 August 2016	(Netherlands) Richairo Zivkovic	(Netherlands) Ajax	(Netherlands) FC Utrecht	Loan
16 August 2016	(Netherlands) Lerin Duarte	(Netherlands) Ajax	(Netherlands) Heracles Almelo	Free transfer
17 August 2016	(Netherlands) Joey Sleegers	(Netherlands) NEC	(Netherlands) VVV-Venlo	Loan
17 August 2016	(Netherlands) Pele van Anholt	(Netherlands) Heerenveen	(Netherlands) Willem II	Free transfer
17 August 2016	(Netherlands) Edson Braafheid	(Italy) Lazio	(Netherlands) FC Utrecht	Free transfer
18 August 2016	(Netherlands) Bart Ramselaar	(Netherlands) FC Utrecht	(Netherlands) PSV	€6,000,000
18 August 2016	(Australia) Jason Davidson	(England) Huddersfield Town	(Netherlands) FC Groningen	Loan
19 August 2016	(Curaçao) Darryl Lachman	(England) Sheffield Wednesday	(Netherlands) Willem II	Free transfer
20 August 2016	(Austria) Marcel Ritzmaier	(Netherlands) PSV	(Netherlands) Go Ahead Eagles	Loan
20 August 2016	(Croatia) Robert Murić	(Netherlands) Ajax	(Italy) Pescara	Loan
21 August 2016	(Netherlands) Sheraldo Becker	(Netherlands) Ajax	(Netherlands) ADO Den Haag	€200,000
22 August 2016	(Netherlands) Siem de Jong	(England) Newcastle United	(Netherlands) PSV	Loan
24 August 2016	(Netherlands) Tim Krul	(England) Newcastle United	(Netherlands) Ajax	Loan
24 August 2016	(Slovenia) Luka Zahović	(Netherlands) Heerenveen	(Slovenia) NK Maribor	Loan
24 August 2016	(Wales) Simon Church	(England) Milton Keynes Dons	(Netherlands) Roda JC	Undisclosed
25 August 2016	(Netherlands) Jasper Cillessen	(Netherlands) Ajax	(Spain) FC Barcelona	€13,000,000
25 August 2016	(Denmark) Nicolai Boilesen	(Netherlands) Ajax	(Denmark) FC Copenhagen	Free transfer
25 August 2016	(Kosovo) Bersant Celina	(England) Manchester City	(Netherlands) FC Twente	Loan
26 August 2016	(Netherlands) Frank van der Struijk	(Netherlands) Willem II	(Scotland) Dundee United	Free transfer
26 August 2016	(Ukraine) Oleksandr Zinchenko	(England) Manchester City	(Netherlands) PSV	Loan
26 August 2016	(Poland) Mateusz Klich	(Germany) 1. FC Kaiserslautern	(Netherlands) FC Twente	Free transfer
26 August 2016	(Netherlands) Paul Gladon	(Netherlands) Heracles Almelo	(England) Wolverhampton Wanderers	€2,000,000
26 August 2016	(Nigeria) Taiwo Awoniyi	(England) Liverpool	(Netherlands) NEC	Loan
29 August 2016	(Sweden) Samuel Armenteros	(Azerbaijan) Qarabağ	(Netherlands) Heracles Almelo	Free transfer
30 August 2016	(Georgia (country)) Valeri Qazaishvili	(Netherlands) Vitesse	(Poland) Legia Warszawa	Loan
30 August 2016	(Kosovo) Sinan Bytyqi	(England) Manchester City	(Netherlands) Go Ahead Eagles	Loan
30 August 2016	(Netherlands) Rai Vloet	(Netherlands) PSV	(Netherlands) FC Eindhoven	Loan
30 August 2016	(Netherlands) Hicham Faik	(Netherlands) Roda JC	(Netherlands) Excelsior	Free transfer
30 August 2016	(Morocco) Adnane Tighadouini	(Spain) Málaga	(Netherlands) Vitesse	Loan
30 August 2016	(Morocco) Hakim Ziyech	(Netherlands) FC Twente	(Netherlands) Ajax	€11,000,000
30 August 2016	(Belgium) Jordy Croux	(Netherlands) MVV Maastricht	(Netherlands) Willem II	€100,000
31 August 2016	(Netherlands) Cihat Çelik	(Netherlands) NEC	(Netherlands) FC Oss	Free transfer
31 August 2016	(Netherlands) Youri Loen	(Netherlands) Sparta Rotterdam	(Netherlands) FC Emmen	Free transfer
31 August 2016	(Belgium) Sébastien Locigno	(Belgium) KV Oostende	(Netherlands) Go Ahead Eagles	Loan
31 August 2016	(Netherlands) Mike van Duinen	(Germany) Fortuna Düsseldorf	(Netherlands) Excelsior	Free transfer
31 August 2016	(Netherlands) Robin van der Meer	(Netherlands) Go Ahead Eagles	(Netherlands) FC Utrecht	Undisclosed
31 August 2016	(Germany) André Fomitschow	(Germany) 1. FC Kaiserslautern	(Netherlands) NEC	Free transfer
31 August 2016	(Austria) Fabian Gmeiner	(Germany) VfB Stuttgart	(Netherlands) NEC	Free transfer
31 August 2016	(Morocco) Iliass Bel Hassani	(Netherlands) Heracles Almelo	(Netherlands) AZ	Undisclosed
31 August 2016	(England) Shay Facey	(England) Manchester City	(Netherlands) Heerenveen	Loan
31 August 2016	(Netherlands) Adam Maher	(Netherlands) PSV	(Turkey) Osmanlıspor	Loan
31 August 2016	(Guinea) Mathias Pogba	(Scotland) Partick Thistle	(Netherlands) Sparta Rotterdam	Free transfer
31 August 2016	(Denmark) Nicolai Brock-Madsen	(England) Birmingham City	(Netherlands) PEC Zwolle	Loan
31 August 2016	(United States) Matt Miazga	(England) Chelsea	(Netherlands) Vitesse	Loan
31 August 2016^{2}	(Norway) Markus Henriksen	(Netherlands) AZ	(England) Hull City	Loan

== Notes ==
1. Transfer will take place on 1 July 2016.
2. Will permanently sign with Hull in January 2017.
