= Coen Gortemaker =

Dutch footballer

Personal information
- Full name: Coen Christian Gortemaker
- Date of birth: 29 January 1994 (age 32)
- Place of birth: Enschede, Netherlands
- Height: 1.85 m (6 ft 1 in)
- Position: Left back

Youth career
- –2004: Sparta Enschede
- 2004–2012: Twente

Senior career*
Years	Team	Apps	(Gls)
2012–2014	Twente	0	(0)
2014–2016	Heracles	0	(0)
2016–2017	Achilles '29	5	(0)
2017–2018	HHC	1	(0)
2018–2019	Sportlust Glanerbrug		
Total		6	(0)
- * Club domestic league appearances and goals

Coen Christian Gortemaker (born 29 January 1994) is a Dutch retired footballer who played as a left back. He played for FC Twente, Heracles Almelo, Achilles '29, and HHC Hardenberg.

== Career ==
Gortemaker was born in Enschede. He made his debut for FC Twente on 12 July 2012 in Europa League away against UE Santa Coloma. He joined Heracles in summer 2014 and moved to Achilles '29 in 2016.

He retired from football in February 2018. With former Achilles '29 and HHC teammate Rick Hemmink he started his own sneaker brand.
