= Millen Baars =

Dutch footballer (born 2000)

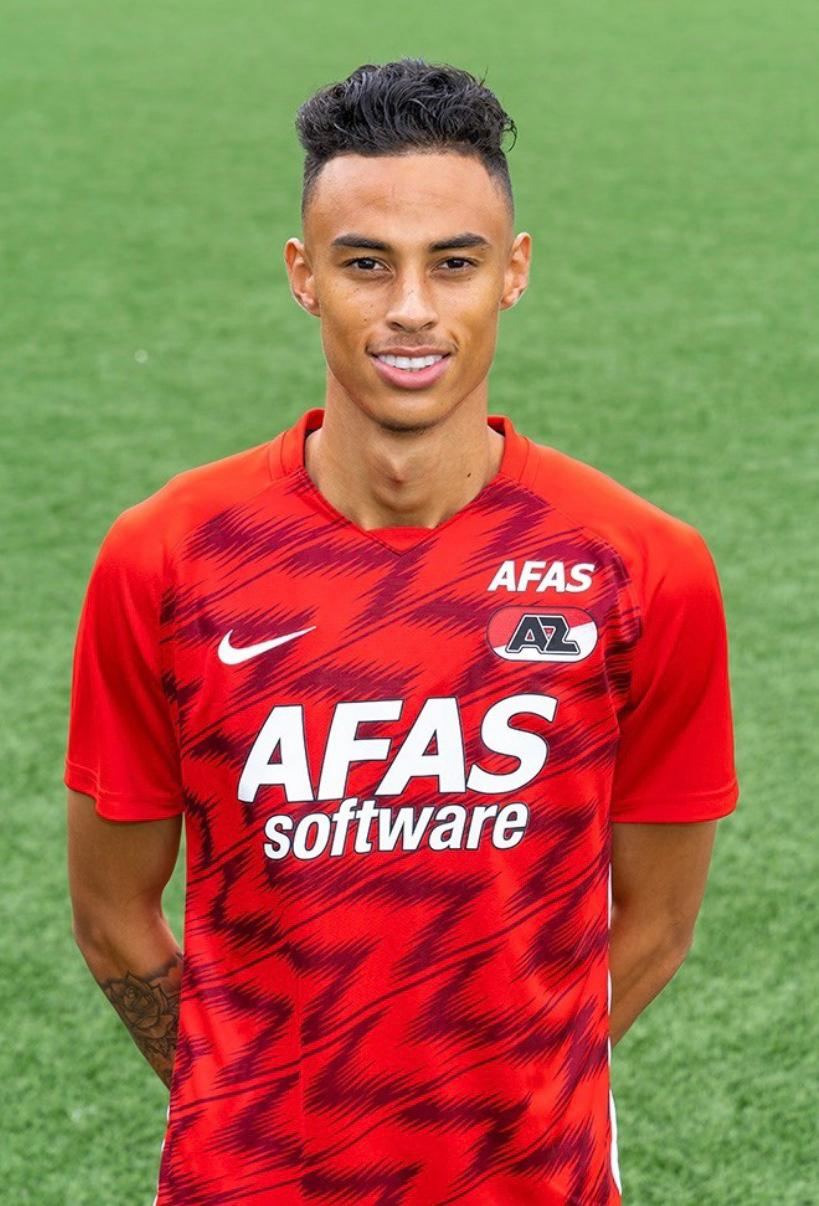
- Baars at AZ Alkmaar

Personal information
- Date of birth: 30 May 2000 (age 26)
- Place of birth: Beverwijk, the Netherlands
- Height: 1.86 m (6 ft 1 in)
- Position: Forward

Youth career
- –2008: De Kennemers
- 2008–2016: Ajax
- 2016–2019: Manchester United
- 2020: AZ Alkmaar

Senior career*
Years	Team	Apps	(Gls)
2020–2021	Jong AZ	14	(0)

International career
2018	Netherlands U19	2	(0)
- * Club domestic league appearances and goals

Millen Baars (born 30 May 2000) is a Dutch former footballer who played as a forward.

== Club career ==
Born in Beverwijk, Baars began his career with De Kennemers, before moving to professional club Ajax. After eight years with the club, and being named captain of the youth side by coach Gery Vink, he abruptly left the club, with a statement released saying that Baars' "strong character did not match the wishes of the senior coaches."

Following his release, he was approached by a number of English Premier League sides, but having been invited to watch their first team match against Fenerbahçe, he decided on joining Manchester United, rejecting an approach from Chelsea in the process. Having signed in October 2016, outside of a transfer window, he was unable to feature for the club's youth teams as he could not be registered until January 2017. He was released by the club at the end of the 2018–19 season.

Following his release, he returned to the Netherlands and in February 2020 he began training with AZ Alkmaar. Following impressive performances, he earned a professional contract in May 2020—a two-year deal. In December 2020, despite the poor form of Jong AZ in the Eerste Divisie, Baars stated that he did not regret the move, and that he was playing "a lot of matches in a good competition."

Having been without a club for over a year, he trialled unsuccessfully with Polish club Legia Warsaw's reserve team in 2023.

== International career ==
Born in the Netherlands, Baars is of Surinamese descent. He is a youth international for the Netherlands.

== Career statistics ==
=== Club ===
Appearances and goals by club, season and competition
Club	Season	League			Cup		Other		Total	
Club	Season	Division	Apps	Goals	Apps	Goals	Apps	Goals	Apps	Goals
Jong AZ	2020–21	Eerste Divisie	14	0	–		0	0	14	0
Career total			14	0	0	0	0	0	14	0
