= 2013–14 AFC Ajax season =

Dutch football club season

Ajax
2013–14 season
- Chairman: Hennie Henrichs
- Manager: Frank de Boer
- Eredivisie: 1st
- KNVB Cup: Runners-up
- Champions League: Group stage
- Europa League: Round of 32
- Johan Cruyff Shield: Winners
- Top goalscorer: League: Davy Klaassen; Kolbeinn Sigþórsson (10 each); All: Lasse Schöne (14 goals)
Home colours	Away colours	Third colours

The 2013–14 AFC Ajax season saw the club participate in the Eredivisie, the KNVB Cup and the UEFA Champions League. The first training took place on 24 June 2012, and the traditional AFC Ajax Open Day was held on 25 July, followed by a testimonial match on 3 July for retired former Ajax forward Sjaak Swart (also known as "Mr. Ajax") for his 75th birthday.

The 2013–14 season marked the Jupiler League debut of Ajax's reserve squad Jong Ajax. Previously playing in the Beloften Eredivisie (a separate league for reserve teams, not included in the Dutch professional or amateur league structure), players were allowed to move around freely between the reserve team and the first team during the course of the season. This will no longer be the case as Jong Ajax will register and field a separate squad from that of Ajax first team whose home matches will be played at Sportpark De Toekomst while playing in the Eerste Divisie, except for the occasional match in the Amsterdam Arena. The only period in which players will be able to move between squads will be during the transfer windows. Furthermore, the team is not eligible for promotion to the Eredivisie. Jong Ajax are joined in the Eerste Divisie by Jong Twente and Jong PSV, reserve teams who have also moved from the Beloften Eredivisie to the Eerste Divisie.

== Pre-season ==
The first training for the 2013–14 season was held on 24 June 2013. In preparation for the new season Ajax organized a training stage in De Lutte, Netherlands. The squad from manager Frank de Boer stayed there from 15 to 24 June. During this training stage, friendly matches were played against SDC Putten. The club then traveled to Stubaital, Austria, for additional training. The squad stayed there from 1 to 9 July. A further friendly match was played against Dynamo Dresden in Germany. Returning to the Netherlands, further friendly matches were scheduled against RKC Waalwijk and De Graafschap on the same day, as well as Osasuna and Werder Bremen on the same day, a few days later.

== Player statistics ==
Appearances for competitive matches only

No.	Pos	Nat	Player	Total		Eredivisie		UEFA Champions League UEFA Europa League		KNVB Cup 2013 Johan Cruyff Shield	
No.	Pos	Nat	Player	Apps	Goals	Apps	Goals	Apps	Goals	Apps	Goals
1	GK	(Netherlands) NED	Kenneth Vermeer	16	0	10	0	1	0	5	0
2	DF	(Netherlands) NED	Ricardo van Rhijn	45	3	31+1	2	8	0	4+1	1
4	DF	(Finland) FIN	Niklas Moisander	33	1	22+1	1	5	0	5	0
5	MF	(Denmark) DEN	Christian Poulsen	42	1	14+14	1	5+3	0	2+4	0
6	DF	(Netherlands) NED	Mike van der Hoorn	9	0	2+1	0	1+4	0	1	0
7	FW	(Denmark) DEN	Viktor Fischer	35	7	19+5	3	5+1	0	4+1	4
8	MF	(Netherlands) NED	Lerin Duarte	22	3	6+8	3	4+1	0	2+1	0
9	FW	(Iceland) ISL	Kolbeinn Sigþórsson	42	12	20+10	10	6+1	0	3+2	2
10	FW	(Netherlands) NED	Siem de Jong	27	9	16+2	7	6	0	3	2
11	FW	(Spain) ESP	Bojan	32	5	17+7	4	3+1	0	4	1
12	DF	(Netherlands) NED	Joël Veltman	34	1	24+1	1	4	0	4+1	0
15	DF	(Denmark) DEN	Nicolai Boilesen	28	1	17+3	1	3+1	0	3+1	0
16	FW	(Denmark) DEN	Lucas Andersen	16	1	4+5	0	1+3	0	2+1	1
17	DF	(Netherlands) NED	Daley Blind	43	1	28	1	8	0	7	0
18	FW	(Netherlands) NED	Davy Klaassen	36	11	23+3	10	5	1	5	0
19	FW	(Sweden) SWE	Tobias Sana	4	0	2+2	0	0	0	0	0
20	MF	(Denmark) DEN	Lasse Schöne	40	13	25+4	8	3+3	2	5	3
22	GK	(Netherlands) NED	Jasper Cillessen	33	0	24+1	0	7	0	1	0
24	DF	(Netherlands) NED	Stefano Denswil	28	2	15+2	1	6+1	1	3+1	0
25	MF	(South Africa) RSA	Thulani Serero	40	5	25+4	3	4+1	1	4+2	1
27	DF	(Netherlands) NED	Ruben Ligeon	8	0	4+1	0	0	0	3	0
30	GK	(Netherlands) NED	Mickey van der Hart	1	0	0	0	0	0	1	0
31	FW	(Germany) GER	Marvin Höner	0	0	0	0	0	0	0	0
32	DF	(Netherlands) NED	Riechedly Bazoer	0	0	0	0	0	0	0	0
33	FW	(Serbia) SRB	Dejan Meleg	0	0	0	0	0	0	0	0
34	FW	(Netherlands) NED	Lesley de Sa	18	1	5+7	1	2+1	0	1+2	0
36	DF	(Netherlands) NED	Kenny Tete	0	0	0	0	0	0	0	0
37	MF	(Netherlands) NED	Fabian Sporkslede	0	0	0	0	0	0	0	0
38	MF	(Slovakia) SVK	Stanislav Lobotka	0	0	0	0	0	0	0	0
39	FW	(Netherlands) NED	Sam Hendriks	0	0	0	0	0	0	0	0
40	GK	(Netherlands) NED	Peter Leeuwenburgh	0	0	0	0	0	0	0	0
42	DF	(Netherlands) NED	Jaïro Riedewald	6	2	3+2	2	0+1	0	0	0
43	FW	(Netherlands) NED	Ricardo Kishna	10	1	5+3	1	0+1	0	0+1	0
44	DF	(Netherlands) NED	Kenny Tete	0	0	0	0	0	0	0	0
45	FW	(Netherlands) NED	Sheraldo Becker	0	0	0	0	0	0	0	0
Players sold or loaned out after the start of the season:
3	DF	(Belgium) BEL	Toby Alderweireld	5	0	4	0	0	0	1	0
8	FW	(Denmark) DEN	Christian Eriksen	5	2	4	2	0	0	1	0
21	FW	(Netherlands) NED	Derk Boerrigter	0	0	0	0	0	0	0	0
23	FW	(Netherlands) NED	Danny Hoesen	19	6	4+10	2	1+1	1	3	3
26	DF	(Netherlands) NED	Dico Koppers	0	0	0	0	0	0	0	0
26	MF	(Cameroon) CMR	Eyong Enoh	0	0	0	0	0	0	0	0
35	DF	(Netherlands) NED	Sven Nieuwpoort	0	0	0	0	0	0	0	0
42	FW	(Netherlands) NED	Joeri de Kamps	0	0	0	0	0	0	0	0
43	MF	(Netherlands) NED	Ilan Boccara	0	0	0	0	0	0	0	0
55	FW	(Netherlands) NED	Jody Lukoki	0	0	0	0	0	0	0	0
56	FW	(Netherlands) NED	Gino van Kessel	0	0	0	0	0	0	0	0
57	FW	(Bosnia and Herzegovina) BIH	Boban Lazić	0	0	0	0	0	0	0	0
64	DF	(Netherlands) NED	Danzell Gravenberch	0	0	0	0	0	0	0	0
65	FW	(Netherlands) NED	Geoffrey Castillion	0	0	0	0	0	0	0	0
67	FW	(Nigeria) NGR	Moses Simon	0	0	0	0	0	0	0	0

Updated 11 January 2014

=== 2013–14 selection by nationality ===
Nationality	(Netherlands)	(Denmark)	(Finland)	(Iceland)	(South Africa)	(Spain)	(Sweden)	(China)	(Germany)	(Serbia)	(Slovakia)	(Cameroon)	Total Players
Current squad selection	14	5	1	1	1	1	1	-	-	-	-	-	24
Youth/reserves squad in AFC Ajax selection	18	-	-	-	-	-	-	1	1	1	1	-	22
Players out on loan	9	-	-	-	-	-	-	-	-	-	-	1	10

== Team statistics ==
=== Eredivisie standings 2013–14 ===
Current standing	Matches played	Wins	Draws	Losses	Points	Goals for	Goals against	Yellow cards (yellow card)	Red cards (red card)
1	34	20	11	3	71	69	28	31	1

==== Points by match day ====
Match day	1	2	3	4	5	6	7	8	9	10	11	12	13	14	15	16	17	18	19	20	21	22	23	24	25	26	27	28	29	30	31	32	33	34	Total
Points	3	0	3	1	1	3	0	3	3	1	1	0	3	3	3	3	3	3	3	3	1	3	1	3	3	3	1	1	3	3	1	3	1	1	71

==== Total points by match day ====
Match day	1	2	3	4	5	6	7	8	9	10	11	12	13	14	15	16	17	18	19	20	21	22	23	24	25	26	27	28	29	30	31	32	33	34	Total
Points	3	3	6	7	8	11	11	14	17	18	19	19	22	25	28	31	34	37	40	43	44	47	48	51	54	57	58	59	62	65	66	69	70	71	71

==== Standing by match day ====
Match day	1	2	3	4	5	6	7	8	9	10	11	12	13	14	15	16	17	18	19	20	21	22	23	24	25	26	27	28	29	30	31	32	33	34	Standing
Standing	2	8	3	4	4	3	7	4	4	4	2	6	3	2	2	2	2	1	1	1	1	1	1	1	1	1	1	1	1	1	1	1	1	1	1

==== Goals by match day ====
Match day	1	2	3	4	5	6	7	8	9	10	11	12	13	14	15	16	17	18	19	20	21	22	23	24	25	26	27	28	29	30	31	32	33	34	Total
Goals	3	2	2	3	1	2	0	6	3	1	0	0	3	3	4	4	2	2	1	1	1	2	1	3	4	2	1	0	3	2	1	3	1	2	69

=== Statistics for the 2013–14 season ===
- This is an overview of all the statistics for played matches in the 2012–13 season.

	Friendlies	Johan Cruyff Shield	KNVB Cup	UEFA Champions League	UEFA Europa League	Eredivisie	Total
Matches	8 of 8	1 of 1	6 of 6	6 of 6	2 of 2	34 of 34	57 of 57
Win	7 of 8	1 of 1	5 of 6	2 of 6	0 of 2	20 of 34	35 of 57
Draw	0 of 8	0 of 1	0 of 6	2 of 6	0 of 2	11 of 34	12 of 57
Loss	1 of 8	0 of 1	1 of 6	2 of 6	2 of 2	3 of 34	9 of 57
Home	1 of 1	1 of 1	3 of 6	3 of 3	1 of 1	17 of 17	25 of 27
Away	7 of 7	0 of 0	3 of 6	3 of 3	1 of 1	17 of 17	29 of 31
Yellow cards (yellow card)	4	0	6	10	5	31	48
Red cards (red card)	0	0	0	1	0	1	2
2 x yellow in 1 match (yellow card) (yellow-red card)	0	0	1	0	0	0	1
Number of substitutes used (substituted on) (substituted off)	51	3	18	18	6	96	190
Goals for	23	3	16	5	1	69	114
Goals against	7	2	9	8	6	28	60
Balance	+17	+1	+7	-3	-5	+41	+54
Clean sheets	3	0	2	2	0	15	22
Penalties for	0	0	0	0	0	4	4
Penalties against	0	0	0	3	1	1	5

=== 2013–14 Team records ===
Description	Competition	Result
Biggest win	(Netherlands) Friendly match	RKC Waalwijk – Ajax ( 1–5 )
Biggest win	(Netherlands) Johan Cruyff Shield	AZ – Ajax ( 2–3 )
Biggest win	(Netherlands) KNVB Cup	Ajax – ASWH ( 4–1 )
Biggest win	(Europe) UEFA Champions League	Ajax – Barcelona ( 2–1 )
Biggest win	(Europe) UEFA Europa League	—
Biggest win	(Netherlands) Eredivisie	Ajax – Go Ahead Eagles ( 6–0 )
Biggest loss	(Turkey) Friendly match	Galatasaray – Ajax ( 2–1 )
Biggest loss	(Netherlands) Johan Cruyff Shield	—
Biggest loss	(Netherlands) KNVB Cup	PEC Zwolle – Ajax ( 5–1 )
Biggest loss	(Europe) UEFA Champions League	Barcelona – Ajax ( 4–0 )
Biggest loss	(Europe) UEFA Europa League	Ajax – Red Bull Salzburg ( 0–3 )
Biggest loss	(Netherlands) Eredivisie	PSV – Ajax ( 4–0 )
Most goals in a match	(Netherlands) Friendly match	RKC Waalwijk – Ajax ( 1–5 )
Most goals in a match	(Netherlands) Johan Cruyff Shield	AZ – Ajax ( 2–3 )
Most goals in a match	(Netherlands) KNVB Cup	Ajax – Volendam ( 4–2 )
Most goals in a match	(Europe) UEFA Champions League	Barcelona – Ajax ( 4–0 )
Most goals in a match	(Europe) UEFA Europa League	Ajax – Red Bull Salzburg ( 0–3 )
Most goals in a match	(Netherlands) Eredivisie	Ajax – Go Ahead Eagles ( 6–0 )

==== Top scorers ====
Friendlies

Nr.	Name	Goal
1.	(Denmark) Christian Eriksen	3
1.	(Netherlands) Derk Boerrigter	3
3.	(Netherlands) Davy Klaassen	2
3.	(Netherlands) Mike van der Hoorn	2
4.	(Serbia) Dejan Meleg	1
4.	(Denmark) Nicolai Boilesen	1
4.	(Netherlands) Jody Lukoki	1
4.	(Netherlands) Danny Hoesen	1
4.	(Netherlands) Ruben Ligeon	1
4.	(Bosnia and Herzegovina) Boban Lazić	1
4.	(Iceland) Kolbeinn Sigþórsson	1
4.	(Denmark) Viktor Fischer	1
4.	(Nigeria) Moses Simon	1
4.	(Netherlands) Daley Blind	1
4.	(Spain) Bojan	1
4.	(Sweden) Tobias Sana	1
4.	(South Africa) Thulani Serero	1
4.	(Denmark) Lucas Andersen	1
4.	(Netherlands) Lerin Duarte	1
4.	(Netherlands) Stefano Denswil	1
Total		26

Johan Cruyff Shield

Nr.	Name	Goal
1.	(Iceland) Kolbeinn Sigþórsson	1
1.	(Netherlands) Siem de Jong	1
Own goals	(Netherlands) Jeffrey Gouweleeuw (AZ)	1
Total		3

Eredivisie

Nr.	Name	Goal
1.	(Iceland) Kolbeinn Sigþórsson	10
1.	(Netherlands) Davy Klaassen	10
3.	(Denmark) Lasse Schöne	8
4.	(Netherlands) Siem de Jong	7
5.	(Spain) Bojan	4
6.	(Denmark) Viktor Fischer	3
6.	(South Africa) Thulani Serero	3
6.	(Netherlands) Lerin Duarte	3
9.	(Netherlands) Ricardo van Rhijn	2
9.	(Denmark) Christian Eriksen	2
9.	(Netherlands) Danny Hoesen	2
9.	(Netherlands) Jaïro Riedewald	2
9.	(Netherlands) Joël Veltman	2
14.	(Finland) Niklas Moisander	1
14.	(Netherlands) Lesley de Sa	1
14.	(Denmark) Nicolai Boilesen	1
14.	(Netherlands) Daley Blind	1
14.	(Netherlands) Ricardo Kishna	1
14.	(Netherlands) Stefano Denswil	1
14.	(Denmark) Christian Poulsen	1
Own goals	(Netherlands) Maikel van der Werff (PEC Zwolle)	1
Own goals	(Netherlands) Jop van der Linden (Go Ahead Eagles)	1
Own goals	(Netherlands) Jeffrey Leiwakabessy (NEC)	1
Total		69

KNVB Cup

Nr.	Name	Goal
1.	(Denmark) Viktor Fischer	4
2.	(Denmark) Lasse Schöne	3
2.	(Netherlands) Danny Hoesen	3
4.	(Denmark) Lucas Andersen	1
4.	(Netherlands) Siem de Jong	1
4.	(Iceland) Kolbeinn Sigþórsson	1
4.	(Spain) Bojan	1
4.	(South Africa) Thulani Serero	1
4.	(Netherlands) Ricardo van Rhijn	1
Total		16

UEFA Champions League

Nr.	Name	Goal
1.	(Denmark) Lasse Schöne	2
2.	(Netherlands) Stefano Denswil	1
2.	(South Africa) Thulani Serero	1
2.	(Netherlands) Danny Hoesen	1
Total		5

UEFA Europa League

Nr.	Name	Goal
1.	(Netherlands) Davy Klaassen	1
Total		1

Antalya Cup

Nr.	Name	Goal
1.	(Netherlands) Mike van der Hoorn	2
Total		2

== Placements ==
	Friendlies	Antalya Cup	Johan Cruyff Shield	KNVB Cup	UEFA Champions League	UEFA Europa League	Eredivisie
Status	7 played, 7 wins, 1 draw, 0 losses	4th place	Winners; Last opponent: AZ	Runners-up; Last opponent: PEC Zwolle	3rd Place in Group H Placement for: UEFA Europa League	Round of 32; Last opponent: Red Bull Salzburg	Champions; 71 points in 34 matches 33rd title

- Lasse Schöne is voted Player of the year by the supporters of AFC Ajax.
- Davy Klaassen is voted Talent of the year by the supporters of AFC Ajax.
- Frank de Boer is winner of the Rinus Michels Award 2014 in the category: Best Trainer/Coach in Professional Football.
- Niklas Moisander is voted Finnish Footballer of the Year: 2013 by the Football Association of Finland.
- Davy Klaassen is voted Hilversum Sportsman of the Year: 2013 by the Municipality of Hilversum.
- Davy Klaassen is voted Dutch Football Talent of the Year: 2014 by De Telegraaf and Voetbal International.
- Jasper Cillessen is winner of the Gillette Player of the year 2014 by Voetbal International.
- AFC Ajax wins Football Shirt of the Year: 2013–14 away shirt by Adidas.
- Daley Blind wins the Golden boots award.

== Competitions ==
All times are in CEST

=== Johan Cruyff Shield ===
27 July 2013	AZ	2–3 (a.e.t.)	Ajax	Amsterdam
20:45 CET	Guðmundsson 51'; Jóhannsson 67'	Report	Gouweleeuw 69' (o.g.); Sigþórsson 75'; De Jong 103'	Stadium: Amsterdam Arena; Referee: Richard Liesveld

=== Eredivisie ===
==== League table ====
Pos	Team	Pld	W	D	L	GF	GA	GD	Pts	Qualification or relegation
1	Ajax (C)	34	20	11	3	69	28	+41	71	Qualification for the Champions League group stage
2	Feyenoord	34	20	7	7	76	40	+36	67	Qualification for the Champions League third qualifying round
3	Twente	34	17	12	5	72	37	+35	63	Qualification for the Europa League play-off round
4	PSV	34	18	5	11	60	45	+15	59	Qualification for the Europa League third qualifying round
5	Heerenveen	34	16	9	9	72	51	+21	57	Qualification for the European competition play-offs

Source: Eredivisie
Rules for classification: 1) points; 2) goal difference; 3) number of goals scored
(C) Champions

==== Matches ====
2 August 2013 1	Ajax	3–0	Roda JC	Amsterdam
20:00 CEST	Van Rhijn 9', (yellow card) 27'; De Jong 31'; Blind (yellow card) 68'; Fischer 83'	Report	Pluim (penalty missed); Van Peppen (yellow card) 73'	Stadium: Amsterdam Arena; Attendance: 51,445; Referee: Danny Makkelie

11 August 2013 2	AZ	3–2	Ajax	Alkmaar
14:30 CEST	Beerens 45'; Johansson (yellow card) 53'; Viergever (yellow card) 63'; Jóhannsson 66' (pen.); Elm 74'	Report	Eriksen 21'; Bojan (yellow card) 41'; De Jong 59'; Van Rhijn (red card) 65'	Stadium: AFAS Stadion; Attendance: 16,000; Referee: Bas Nijhuis

18 August 2013 3	Ajax	2–1	Feyenoord	Amsterdam
12:30 CEST	Eriksen (yellow card) 9'; Sigþórsson 31' (pen.), 37'	Report	Pellè 6'; Vormer (yellow card) 30'; Mulder (yellow card) 31'; Immers (yellow card) 32'; Vilhena (yellow card) 90+2'	Stadium: Amsterdam Arena; Attendance: 52,581; Referee: Björn Kuipers

23 August 2013 4	Heerenveen	3–3	Ajax	Heerenveen
20:00 CEST	Finnbogason 23', 32'; Ziyech (yellow card) 35'; Eikrem 44'; Slagveer (yellow card) 58'; De Roon (yellow card) 70'	Report	Moisander 13'; Sigþórsson 17'; Van Rhijn (yellow card) 36'; Boilesen (yellow card) 62'; Eriksen 65'	Stadium: Abe Lenstra Stadion; Attendance: 25,205; Referee: Pieter Vink

1 September 2013 5	Groningen	1–1	Ajax	Groningen
18:30 CEST	Zeefuik 76'; Chery (yellow card) 79'; Van der Velden (yellow card) 90+3'	Report	Schöne 18'; Fischer (yellow card) 84'; Boilesen (yellow card) 90+3'	Stadium: Euroborg; Attendance: 20,000; Referee: Serdar Gözübüyük

14 September 2013 6	Ajax	2–1	PEC Zwolle	Amsterdam
18:45 CEST	Boilesen (yellow card) 56'; Serero 72'; Van der Werff 76' (o.g.)	Report	Van Polen (yellow card) 56'; Nijland (yellow card) 58'; Gravenbeek 89'	Stadium: Amsterdam Arena; Attendance: 51,488; Referee: Reinold Wiedemeijer

22 September 2013 7	PSV	4–0	Ajax	Eindhoven
16:30 CEST	Matavž 53'; Willems 61'; Hiljemark 64'; Park 68'	Report	De Jong (yellow card) 67'	Stadium: Philips Stadion; Attendance: 33,300; Referee: Bas Nijhuis

28 September 2013 8	Ajax	6–0	Go Ahead Eagles	Amsterdam
	Van der Linden 48' (o.g.); De Sa 50'; Sigþórsson 52', 53'; Duarte 64'; De Jong 69'	Report	Falkenburg (yellow card) 10'; Turuc (yellow card) 59'; Schenk (yellow card) 68'	Stadium: Amsterdam Arena; Attendance: 48,587; Referee: Tom van Sichem

6 October 2013 9	Ajax	3–0	Utrecht	Amsterdam
12:30 CEST	Serero 45'; Klaassen 59'; Hoesen 90+1'	Report	Mårtensson (yellow card) 26'; Ayoub (yellow card) 17'	Stadium: Amsterdam Arena; Attendance: 49,294; Referee: Kevin Blom

19 October 2013 10	Twente	1–1	Ajax	Enschede
20:45 CEST	Castaignos 22'; Bengtsson (yellow card) 90'	Report	Serero (yellow card) 71'; Sigþórsson 81'	Stadium: De Grolsch Veste; Attendance: 30,000; Referee: Pieter Vink

26 October 2013 11	Ajax	0–0	RKC Waalwijk	Amsterdam
20:45 CEST	Denswil (yellow card) 72'	Report	Duits (yellow card) 46'; Beauguel (yellow card) 87'	Stadium: Amsterdam Arena; Attendance: 48,256; Referee: Eric Braamhaar

2 November 2013 12	Ajax	0–1	Vitesse	Amsterdam
19:45 CEST	Poulsen (yellow card) 63'; Blind (yellow card) 73'	Report	Vejinović (yellow card) 55'; Pröpper (yellow card) 78'; Kakuta (yellow card) 89'; Qazaishvili 90'	Stadium: Amsterdam Arena; Attendance: 51,377; Referee: Bas Nijhuis

10 November 2013 13	NEC	0–3	Ajax	Nijmegen
14:30 CEST	Higdon (yellow card) 58'; Leiwakabessy (yellow card) 66'; Sutter (yellow card) 90'	Report	De Jong 26', 72'; Boilesen 28'	Stadium: Stadion de Goffert; Attendance: 12,000; Referee: Björn Kuipers

23 November 2013 14	Ajax	3–0	Heracles	Amsterdam
20:45 CET	Hoesen 2'; Fischer 56'; Klaassen 79'	Report	Linssen (yellow card) 44'; Bruns (yellow card) 52'; Rienstra (yellow card) 80'	Stadium: Amsterdam Arena; Attendance: 49,747; Referee: Pol van Boekel

1 December 2013 15	ADO Den Haag	0–4	Ajax	The Hague
	Zuiverloon (yellow card) 12'; Kramer (yellow card) 20'; Beugelsdijk (yellow card) 54'	Report	Klaassen 10'; Fischer 34'; Van Rhijn (yellow card) 33', (goal) 68'; Blind (yellow card) 49'; Schöne (yellow card) 61'; Bojan 90'	Stadium: Kyocera Stadion; Attendance: 13,236; Referee: Reinold Wiedemeijer

7 December 2013 16	Ajax	4–0	NAC Breda	Amsterdam
18:45 CET	Klaassen 34', 45+1', 64'; Bojan 68', (yellow card) 74'	Report	Kwakman (yellow card) 30'; De Roover (yellow card) 36'; Van der Weg (yellow card) 60'; Suk (yellow card) 88' (red card)	Stadium: Amsterdam Arena; Attendance: 50,189; Referee: Danny Makkelie

15 December 2013 17	Cambuur	1–2	Ajax	Leeuwarden
12:30	Ritzmaier (yellow card) 17' (yellow-red card) 90+1'; Hemmen 82'	Report	Schöne 40'; Klaassen 90+2'	Stadium: Cambuur Stadion; Attendance: 10,000; Referee: Pieter Vink

22 December 2013 18	Roda JC	1–2	Ajax	Kerkrade
12:30	Dijkhuizen 34', (yellow card) 45'; Van Peppen (yellow card) 70'	Report	Riedewald 88', 90+2', (yellow card) 90+3'	Stadium: Parkstad Limburg Stadion; Attendance: 18,058; Referee: Bas Nijhuis

19 January 2014 19	Ajax	1–0	PSV	Amsterdam
	Sigþórsson 64'	Report		Stadium: Amsterdam Arena; Attendance: 51,396; Referee: Björn Kuipers

26 January 2014 20	Go Ahead Eagles	0–1	Ajax	Deventer
14:30	Kolder (yellow card) 62'; Schmidt (yellow card) 90+1'	Report	Klaassen (yellow card) 51'; Schöne 74'	Stadium: De Adelaarshorst; Attendance: 7,938; Referee: Reinold Wiedemeijer

2 February 2014 21	Utrecht	1–1	Ajax	Utrecht
12:30	De Ridder 33'	Report	Van Rhijn (yellow card) 16'; Blind 25'	Stadium: Stadion Galgenwaard; Attendance: 19,245; Referee: Richard Liesveld

6 February 2014 22	Ajax	2–1	Groningen	Amsterdam
20:45	Schöne 28' (pen.); Sigþórsson 83'	Report	Kappelhof (yellow card) 20'; De Leeuw (yellow card) 33'; Kostić 41'; Wijnaldum (yellow card) 48'	Stadium: Amsterdam Arena; Attendance: 50,638; Referee: Serdar Gözübüyük

9 February 2014 23	PEC Zwolle	1–1	Ajax	Zwolle
14:30	Fernandez 36'	Report	Klaassen 7'	Stadium: IJsseldelta Stadion; Attendance: 12,500; Referee: Eric Braamhaar

16 February 2014 24	Ajax	3–0	Heerenveen	Amsterdam
16:30	Schöne 12' (pen.), 18' (pen.), 82'; Serero (yellow card) 20'; Van Rhijn (yellow card) 48'	Report	Van den Berg (yellow card) 12'; De Roon (yellow card) 20'; Ziyech (yellow card) 34'; Van Aken (yellow card) 86'	Stadium: Amsterdam Arena; Attendance: 51,396; Referee: Pol van Boekel

23 February 2014 25	Ajax	4–0	AZ	Amsterdam
14:30	De Jong 4'; De Sa (yellow card) 26'; Duarte 54', 74'; Kishna 61'	Report	Ortiz (yellow card) 40'; Elm (yellow card) 84'	Stadium: Amsterdam Arena; Attendance: 51,404; Referee: Pieter Vink

2 March 2014 26	Feyenoord	1–2	Ajax	Rotterdam
14:30	Pellè 30'; Classie (yellow card) 50'; Te Vrede (yellow card) 76'	Report	Sigþórsson 45'; Veltman 72', (yellow card) 89'	Stadium: De Kuip; Attendance: 48,000; Referee: Bjorn Kuipers

9 March 2014 27	Ajax	1–1	Cambuur	Amsterdam
16:30	De Jong 2'	Report	Ritzmaier (yellow card) 41'; Barto 53', (yellow card) 90+3'; Leeuwin (yellow card) 79'; Lukoki (yellow card) 90+4'	Stadium: Amsterdam Arena; Attendance: 52,345; Referee: Danny Makkelie

16 March 2014 28	NAC Breda	0–0	Ajax	Breda
14:30	Kwakman (yellow card) 57'; Hooi (yellow card) 64'; Swerts (yellow card) 71'	Report	Serero (yellow card) 45'; Veltman (yellow card) 60'	Stadium: Rat Verlegh Stadion; Attendance: 18,500; Referee: Richard Liesveld

30 March 2014 29	Ajax	3–0	Twente	Amsterdam
14:30	Denswil 29'; Schöne 58'; Bojan 65'	Report		Stadium: Amsterdam Arena; Attendance: 51,117; Referee: Pieter Vink

2 April 2014 30	RKC Waalwijk	0–2	Ajax	Waalwijk
18:45		Report	Veltman 14'; Klaassen 28'	Stadium: Mandemakers Stadion; Attendance: 7,508; Referee: Eric Braamhaar

6 April 2014 31	Vitesse	1–1	Ajax	Arnhem
	Traoré 25'; Kashia (yellow card) 83'; Piazon (yellow card) 89'	Report	Blind (yellow card) 40'; Sigþórsson 47'; Duarte (yellow card) 71'; Van Rhijn (yellow card) 89'	Stadium: GelreDome; Attendance: 25,500; Referee: Björn Kuipers

13 April 2014 32	Ajax	3–2	ADO Den Haag	Amsterdam
16:30	Poulsen 35', (yellow card) 41'; Klaassen 69'; Serero 79'	Report	Meijers (yellow card) 31'; Denswil 36' (o.g.); Beugelsdijk (yellow card) 43', (goal) 90+1'; Van Duinen (yellow card) 90+1'	Stadium: Amsterdam Arena; Attendance: 52,671; Referee: Richard Liesveld

27 April 2014 33	Heracles	1–1	Ajax	Almelo
14:30	Cziommer 22'	Report	Schöne 13'	Stadium: Polman Stadion; Attendance: 8,500; Referee: Pieter Vink

3 May 2014 34	Ajax	2–2	NEC	Amsterdam
18:30	Leiwakabessy 9' (o.g.); Bojan 83'	Report	Jahanbakhsh 74', 88', (yellow card) 88'	Stadium: Amsterdam Arena; Attendance: 51,473; Referee: Kevin Blom

=== KNVB Cup ===
25 September 2013 Second round	Ajax	4–2 (a.e.t.)	Volendam	Amsterdam
20:45 CEST	Andersen 27'; Schöne 97', 115', (yellow card) 82'; Hoesen 112'	Report	Mühren 67', 94'; Coster (yellow card) 80'	Stadium: Amsterdam Arena; Attendance: 27,715; Referee: Ed Janssen

29 October 2013 Third round	Ajax	4–1	ASWH	Amsterdam
19:45 CEST	Fischer 20'; Hoesen 42'; De Jong 45'; Sigþórsson 72'	Report	Van Dommelen 28'; Van Muyen (yellow card) 30'; Van de Werp (yellow card) 35'; Van Stokkom (yellow card) 52'	Stadium: Amsterdam Arena; Attendance: 17,861

19 December 2013 Fourth round	IJsselmeervogels	0–3	Ajax	Bunschoten
	Tol (yellow card) 23'; Van de Laar (yellow card) 61'	Report	Fischer 4', 63'; Hoesen 9'	Stadium: Sportpark De Westmaat; Attendance: 7,500; Referee: Tom van Sichem

22 January 2014 Quarter-finals	Ajax	3–1	Feyenoord	Amsterdam
20:45 CEST	Fischer 34'; Bojan 68'; Serero 90+2'	Report	Boëtius 7'	Stadium: Amsterdam Arena; Attendance: 50,340; Referee: Kevin Blom

27 March 2014 Semi-finals	AZ	0–1	Ajax	Alkmaar
20:45 CEST	Johansson (yellow card) 39' (yellow-red card) 47'	Report	Van Rhijn (yellow card) 7'; Veltman (yellow card) 32' (yellow-red card) 33'; Moisander (yellow card) 33'; Schöne 48'; De Sa (yellow card) 71'	Stadium: AFAS Stadoin; Attendance: 16,321; Referee: Pol van Boekel

20 April 2014 Final	PEC Zwolle	5–1	Ajax	Rotterdam
18:00 CEST	Thomas 8', 12'; Fernandez 22', 34'; Van Polen (yellow card) 24', (goal) 50'	Report	Van Rhijn 3'; Blind (yellow card) 24'	Stadium: De Kuip; Attendance: 42,500; Referee: Bas Nijhuis

- The final match between PEC Zwolle and Ajax was interrupted for 30 minutes as a consequence of the Vuurwerkincident.

=== UEFA Champions League ===
==== Group stage ====
Pos	Team	Pld	W	D	L	GF	GA	GD	Pts	Qualification	BAR	MIL	AJX	CEL
1	(Spain) Barcelona	6	4	1	1	16	5	+11	13	Advance to knockout phase	—	3–1	4–0	6–1
2	(Italy) Milan	6	2	3	1	8	5	+3	9	Advance to knockout phase	1–1	—	0–0	2–0
3	(Netherlands) Ajax	6	2	2	2	5	8	−3	8	Transfer to Europa League	2–1	1–1	—	1–0
4	(Scotland) Celtic	6	1	0	5	3	14	−11	3		0–1	0–3	2–1	—

Source: UEFA

18 September 2013 1	Barcelona (Spain)	4–0	(Netherlands) Ajax	Barcelona, Spain
20:45 CEST	Messi 21', 55', 75'; Piqué 69'	Report	Moisander (yellow card) 26'; Denswil (yellow card) 85'	Stadium: Camp Nou; Attendance: 79,412; Referee: Svein Oddvar Moen (Norway)

1 October 2013 2	Ajax (Netherlands)	1–1	(Italy) Milan	Amsterdam, Netherlands
20:45 CEST	Denswil 90'; Van der Hoorn (yellow card) 90+3'	Report	Constant (yellow card) 42'; Balotelli (yellow card) 60', (goal) 90+4' (pen.)	Stadium: Amsterdam Arena; Attendance: 51,692; Referee: Jonas Eriksson (Sweden)

22 October 2013 3	Celtic (Scotland)	2–1	(Netherlands) Ajax	Glasgow, Scotland
20:45 CEST	Van Dijk (yellow card) 44'; Forrest 45' (pen.); Kayal 54'; Biton (red card) 88'	Report	Veltman (yellow card) 44'; Poulsen (yellow card) 44'; Schöne 90+4'	Stadium: Celtic Park; Attendance: 58,719; Referee: Ivan Bebek (Croatia)

6 November 2013 4	Ajax (Netherlands)	1–0	(Scotland) Celtic	Amsterdam, Netherlands
20:45 CET	Klaassen (yellow card) 41'; Schöne 51'; Denswil (yellow card) 68'	Report	Samaras (yellow card) 19'; Izaguirre (yellow card) 43'	Stadium: Amsterdam Arena; Attendance: 59,908; Referee: Deniz Aytekin (Germany)

26 November 2013 5	Ajax (Netherlands)	2–1	(Spain) Barcelona	Amsterdam, Netherlands
20:45 CET	Schöne (yellow card) 8'; Serero 19'; Hoesen 42'; Veltman (red card) 48'; Van Rhijn (yellow card) 59'	Report	Piqué (yellow card) 31'; Fàbregas (yellow card) 39'; Xavi 49' (pen.); Iniesta (yellow card) 52'; Neymar (yellow card) 53'	Stadium: Amsterdam Arena; Attendance: 53,000; Referee: Pavel Královec (Czech Republic

11 December 2013 6	Milan (Italy)	0–0	(Netherlands) Ajax	Milan, Italy
20:45 CET	Montolivo (red card) 22'; Balotelli (yellow card) 71'; De Jong (yellow card) 83'; De Sciglio (yellow card) 89'; Muntari (yellow card) 90+5'	Report	Blind (yellow card) 63'	Stadium: San Siro; Attendance: 61,744; Referee: Howard Webb (England)

=== UEFA Europa League ===
==== Knockout phase ====
===== Round of 32 =====
20 February 2014 First leg	Ajax (Netherlands)	0–3	(Austria) Red Bull Salzburg	Amsterdam, Netherlands
20:00 CET	Veltman (yellow card) 13'; De Jong (yellow card) 27'; Blind (yellow card) 77'	Report	Soriano 14' (pen.), 35'; Leitgeb (yellow card) 19'; Mané 21'; Hinteregger (yellow card) 42'	Stadium: Amsterdam Arena; Attendance: 51,240; Referee: Clément Turpin (France)

27 February 2014 Second leg	Red Bull Salzburg (Austria)	3–1 (6–1 agg.)	(Netherlands) Ajax	Salzburg, Austria
18:00 CET	Ramalho (yellow card) 43'; Van der Hoorn 56' (o.g.); Mané 66'; Soriano 77'	Report	Poulsen (yellow card) 27'; Denswil (yellow card) 49'; Klaassen 82'	Stadium: Red Bull Arena; Attendance: 25,000; Referee: Paolo Tagliavento (Italy)

=== Antalya Cup ===
10 January 2014	Galatasaray (Turkey)	2–1	(Netherlands) Ajax	Antalya, Turkey
19:30		Report		Stadium: Akdeniz University Stadium

11 January 2014	Trabzonspor (Turkey)	1–1 (4–3 p)	(Netherlands) Ajax	Antalya, Turkey
17:30		Report		Stadium: Akdeniz University Stadium
	Penalties

Final standings
Team	Pld	W	D	L	GF	GA	GD	Pts
(Scotland) Celtic	1	1	0	0	3	1	+2	3
(Turkey) Galatasaray	1	1	0	0	2	1	+1	3
(Turkey) Trabzonspor	2	1	0	1	2	4	−2	3
(Netherlands) Ajax	2	0	0	2	2	3	−1	0

== Friendlies ==
29 June 2013	SDC Putten (Netherlands)	1–4	(Netherlands) Ajax	Putten, Netherlands
14:30	Van Schoor 29'	Report	Meleg 17'; Klaassen 33'; Boilesen 45'; Lukoki 77'	Stadium: Sportpark Putter Eng

6 July 2013	Dynamo Dresden (Germany)	0–3	(Netherlands) Ajax	Dresden, Germany
16:00	Susac (yellow card) 3'	Report	Eriksen 3', 22'; Hoesen 48'; Sporkslede (yellow card) 67'	Stadium: Glücksgas Stadium

13 July 2013	RKC Waalwijk (Netherlands)	1–5	(Netherlands) Ajax	Waalwijk, Netherlands
16:00	Braber 19'	Report	Boerrigter 17', 21', 28'; Ligeon 33'; Lazić 88'	Stadium: Mandemakers Stadion

13 July 2013	De Graafschap (Netherlands)	0–3	(Netherlands) Ajax	Doetinchem, Netherlands
20:00		Report	Sigþórsson 49'; Fischer 61'; Simon 64'	Stadium: De Vijverberg

19 July 2013	Ajax (Netherlands)	1–0	(Spain) Osasuna	Emmen, Netherlands
14:30	Klaassen 6'	Report		Stadium: Univé Stadion

19 July 2013	Werder Bremen (Germany)	2–3	(Netherlands) Ajax	Meppen, Germany
20:15	Akpala 84'; Petersen 90'	Report	Blind 38'; Bojan 43'; Eriksen 88'	Stadium: MEP-Arena

28 July 2013	Ajax (Netherlands)	3–1	(Netherlands) Willem II	Amsterdam, Netherlands
10:00	Van der Hoorn 22'; Sana 37'; Serero 77'	Report	Wuytens 71'	Stadium: Sportpark De Toekomst

11 May 2014	Persija (Indonesia)	0–3	(Netherlands) Ajax	Jakarta, Indonesia
13:30		Report	Andersen 14'; Van der Hoorn 17'; Duarte 71'	Stadium: Gelora Bung Karno Stadium

14 May 2014	Persib (Indonesia)	1–1	(Netherlands) Ajax	Bandung, Indonesia
20:00	Konaté 45'	Report	Denswil 17'	Stadium: Jalak Harupat Soreang Stadium

== Transfers for 2013–14 ==
=== Summer transfer window ===
For a list of all Dutch football transfers in the summer window (1 July 2013 to 31 August 2013) please see List of Dutch football transfers summer 2013.

==== Arrivals ====
- The following players moved to AFC Ajax.

	Name	Position	Transfer type	Previous club	Fee
	Return from loan spell				
Substituted on	(Cameroon) Eyong Enoh	Midfielder	30 June 2013	(England) Fulham	-
Substituted on	(Netherlands) Gino van Kessel	Forward	30 June 2013	(Netherlands) Almere City	-
Substituted on	(Netherlands) Dico Koppers	Defender	30 June 2013	(Netherlands) ADO Den Haag	-
Substituted on	(Netherlands) Sven Nieuwpoort	Defender	30 June 2013	(Netherlands) Almere City	-
	Loan				
Substituted on	(Slovakia) Stanislav Lobotka	Midfielder	30 June 2013	(Slovakia) AS Trenčín	-
Substituted on	(Spain) Bojan	Forward	5 July 2013	(Spain) Barcelona	-
	Transfer				
Substituted on	(Netherlands) Sam Hendriks	Forward	24 June 2013	(Netherlands) De Graafschap	€150,000
Substituted on	(Germany) Marvin Höner	Forward	25 June 2013	(Germany) Arminia Bielefeld	€150,000
Substituted on	(Netherlands) Mike van der Hoorn	Defender	5 July 2013	(Netherlands) Utrecht	€3,800,000
Substituted on	(Netherlands) Lerin Duarte	Midfielder	31 August 2013	(Netherlands) Heracles	€2,500,000
	Free Transfer				
Substituted on	(Angola) Azor Matusiwa	Forward	9 February 2013	(Netherlands) Almere City	-
Substituted on	(Netherlands) Joe van der Sar	Goalkeeper	10 April 2013	(Netherlands) VV Noordwijk	-
Substituted on	(Netherlands) Anwar El Ghazi	Forward	15 April 2013	(Netherlands) Sparta Rotterdam	-
Substituted on	(Belgium) Nathan Leyder	Defender	15 April 2013	(Belgium) Zulte-Waregem	-
Substituted on	(Iceland) Óttar Magnús Karlsson	Forward	27 April 2013	(Iceland) Víkingur	-
Substituted on	(Nigeria) Moses Simon	Forward	10 May 2013	(Nigeria) GBS Academy	-
Substituted on	(Denmark) Markus Bay	Midfielder	11 May 2013	(Denmark) Brøndby	-
Substituted on	(Netherlands) Jan Vermolen	Goalkeeper	22 May 2013	(Netherlands) Twente	-
Substituted on	(China) Wang Chengkuai	Midfielder	2 October 2013	(China) Dalian Shide	-

==== Departures ====
- The following players moved from AFC Ajax.

	Name	Position	Transfer type	New club	Fee
	Out on loan				
Substituted off	(Netherlands) Mitchell Dijks	Defender	22 May 2013	(Netherlands) Heerenveen	-
Substituted off	(Netherlands) Gino van Kessel	Forward	14 July 2013	(Slovakia) AS Trenčín	-
Substituted off	(Netherlands) Jody Lukoki	Forward	2 August 2013	(Netherlands) Cambuur	-
Substituted off	(Netherlands) Sven Nieuwpoort	Defender	29 August 2013	(Netherlands) Almere City	-
Substituted off	(Netherlands) Joeri de Kamps	Midfielder	1 September 2013	(Netherlands) Heerenveen	-
Substituted off	(Netherlands) Ilan Boccara	Midfielder	2 September 2013	(France) Evian	-
	Loan return				
Substituted off	(Spain) Isaac Cuenca	Midfielder	30 June 2013	(Spain) Barcelona	-
	Transfer				
Substituted off	(Netherlands) Dico Koppers	Defender	23 July 2013	(Netherlands) Twente	€800,000
Substituted off	(Netherlands) Derk Boerrigter	Forward	30 July 2013	(Scotland) Celtic	€3,500,000
Substituted off	(Denmark) Christian Eriksen	Midfielder	30 August 2013	(England) Tottenham Hotspur	€13,500,000
Substituted off	(Belgium) Toby Alderweireld	Defender	31 August 2013	(Spain) Atlético Madrid	€7,000,000
	Free Transfer				
Substituted off	(Serbia) Miralem Sulejmani	Forward	15 February 2013	(Portugal) Benfica	-
Substituted off	(Cyprus) Iosif Papamelodias	Defender	13 May 2013	(Netherlands) Utrecht	-
Substituted off	(Netherlands) Stan Bijl	Goalkeeper	25 May 2013	(Netherlands) NEC	-
Substituted off	(Netherlands) Roly Bonevacia	Midfielder	1 June 2013	(Netherlands) Roda JC	-
Substituted off	(Netherlands) Ryan Babel	Forward	5 June 2013	(Turkey) Kasımpaşa	-
Substituted off	(Netherlands) Chiel Kramer	Goalkeeper	6 June 2013	(Netherlands) Heerenveen	-
Substituted off	(Netherlands) Mike Busse	Defender	6 June 2013	(Netherlands) Almere City	-
Substituted off	(Netherlands) Xandro Schenk	Defender	14 June 2013	(Netherlands) Go Ahead Eagles	-
Substituted off	(Finland) Henri Toivomäki	Defender	17 July 2013	(Finland) Lahti	-
Substituted off	(Nigeria) Moses Simon	Forward	25 July 2013	(Slovakia) AS Trenčín	-

=== Winter transfer window ===
For a list of all Dutch football transfers in the winter window (1 January 2014 to 1 February 2014) please see List of Dutch football transfers winter 2013–14.

==== Arrivals ====
- The following players moved to AFC Ajax.

	Name	Position	Transfer type	Previous club	Fee
	Loan return				
Substituted on	(Netherlands) Gino van Kessel	Forward	1 December 2013	(Slovakia) AS Trenčín	-

==== Departures ====
- The following players moved from AFC Ajax.

	Name	Position	Transfer type	New club	Fee
	Out on loan				
Substituted off	(Cameroon) Eyong Enoh	Midfielder	11 January 2013	(Turkey) Antalyaspor	-
Substituted off	(Netherlands) Geoffrey Castillion	Forward	17 January 2013	(Netherlands) NEC	-
Substituted off	(Netherlands) Danzell Gravenberch	Defender	17 January 2013	(Netherlands) NEC	-
Substituted off	(Netherlands) Gino van Kessel	Forward	18 January 2013	(Slovakia) AS Trenčín	-
Substituted off	(Netherlands) Danny Hoesen	Forward	30 January 2013	(Greece) PAOK	-
	Free Transfer				
Substituted off	(Bosnia and Herzegovina) Boban Lazić	Forward	31 January 2014	(Greece) Olympiacos	-
Substituted off	(Switzerland) Stefan Marinković	Defender	31 January 2014	(Finland) Inter Turku	-
Substituted off	(Netherlands) Vincent Vermeij	Forward	31 January 2014	(Netherlands) De Graafschap	-
