= List of Dutch football transfers summer 2013 =

This is a list of transfers in Dutch football for the 2013 Summer transfer window. Only moves featuring an Eredivisie side are listed.

The summer transfer window will open on July 1, 2013, and will close on September 2. Deals may be signed at any given moment in the season, but the actual transfer may only take place during the transfer window. Unattached players may sign at any moment.

Date	Name	Moving from	Moving to	Fee
30 December 2012^{1}	(Netherlands) Roly Bonevacia	(Netherlands) Ajax	(Netherlands) Roda JC Kerkrade	Free
31 December 2012^{1}	(Iceland) Victor Pálsson	(United States) New York Red Bulls	(Netherlands) NEC Nijmegen	Free
5 January 2013^{1}	(Italy) Graziano Pellè	(Italy) Parma	(Netherlands) Feyenoord	€3,000,000
15 February 2013^{1}	(Serbia) Filip Đuričić	(Netherlands) SC Heerenveen	(Portugal) Benfica	€6,000,000
21 March 2013^{1}	(Hungary) Gábor Babos	(Netherlands) NEC Nijmegen	(Netherlands) NAC Breda	Free
23 March 2013^{1}	(Netherlands) Ferry de Regt	(Netherlands) VVV-Venlo	(Netherlands) Helmond Sport	Free
9 April 2013^{1}	(Netherlands) Jeffrey Sarpong	Unattached	(Netherlands) NAC Breda	Free
18 April 2013^{1}	(Australia) Eli Babalj	(Australia) Melbourne Heart	(Netherlands) AZ Alkmaar	Undisclosed
24 April 2013^{1}	(Netherlands) Kyle Ebecilio	(England) Arsenal	(Netherlands) FC Twente	Free
5 May 2013^{1}	(Netherlands) Stanley Elbers	(Netherlands) ADO Den Haag	(Netherlands) Helmond Sport	Free
10 May 2013^{1}	(South Africa) Kamohelo Mokotjo	(Netherlands) Feyenoord	(Netherlands) PEC Zwolle	Free
13 May 2013^{1}	(Netherlands) Stef Nijland	(Netherlands) PSV Eindhoven	(Netherlands) PEC Zwolle	Free
15 May 2013^{1}	(Germany) Christoph Hemlein	(Germany) VfB Stuttgart	(Netherlands) NEC Nijmegen	Free
16 May 2013^{1}	(Netherlands) Furhgill Zeldenrust	(Netherlands) RKC Waalwijk	(Netherlands) FC Den Bosch	Loan
16 May 2013^{1}	(Netherlands) Damiano Schet	(Netherlands) Rijnsburgse Boys	(Netherlands) PEC Zwolle	Free
16 May 2013^{1}	(Czech Republic) Jaroslav Navratil	(Czech Republic) Viktoria Žižkov	(Netherlands) Heracles Almelo	Free
21 May 2013^{1}	(France) Teddy Chevalier	(Netherlands) RKC Waalwijk	(Belgium) KV Kortrijk	Free
24 May 2013^{1}	(Netherlands) Stijn de Looijer	(Netherlands) NEC Nijmegen	(Netherlands) FC Den Bosch	Loan
24 May 2013^{1}	(Netherlands) Melvin de Leeuw	(Netherlands) SC Cambuur	(Scotland) Ross County	Free
24 May 2013^{1}	(Netherlands) Jeffrey Gouweleeuw	(Netherlands) SC Heerenveen	(Netherlands) AZ Alkmaar	€1,500,000
26 May 2013^{1}	(Netherlands) Dennis Gentenaar	(Netherlands) Almere City FC	(Netherlands) NEC Nijmegen	Free
27 May 2013^{1}	(Brazil) Everton Ramos da Silva	(Netherlands) Heracles Almelo	(Saudi Arabia) Al Nassr FC	Free
27 May 2013^{1}	(Netherlands) Mark Janssen	(Netherlands) RKC Waalwijk	(Netherlands) Helmond Sport	Loan
27 May 2013^{1}	(Belgium) Kenny Steppe	(Netherlands) SC Heerenveen	(Belgium) Waasland-Beveren	Free
27 May 2013^{1}	(Netherlands) Danny Wintjens	(Netherlands) PEC Zwolle	(Netherlands) VVV-Venlo	Free
27 May 2013^{1}	(Iran) Alireza Jahanbakhsh	(Iran) Damash	(Netherlands) NEC Nijmegen	Undisclosed
28 May 2013^{1}	(Netherlands) Sonny Stevens	(Netherlands) FC Volendam	(Netherlands) FC Twente	Undisclosed
28 May 2013^{1}	(Belgium) Jimmy Hempte	(Netherlands) Roda JC Kerkrade	(Belgium) Oostende	Free
29 May 2013^{1}	(Netherlands) Michiel Kramer	(Netherlands) FC Volendam	(Netherlands) ADO Den Haag	Free
29 May 2013^{1}	(Netherlands) Wouter de Vogel	(Netherlands) ADO Den Haag	(Netherlands) FC Den Bosch	Free
29 May 2013^{1}	(Netherlands) Ard van Peppen	(Netherlands) RKC Waalwijk	(Netherlands) Roda JC Kerkrade	Free
30 May 2013^{1}	(Finland) Tim Sparv	(Netherlands) FC Groningen	(Germany) SpVgg Greuther Fürth	Free
31 May 2013^{1}	(Cape Verde) Guy Ramos	(Netherlands) RKC Waalwijk	(Netherlands) Roda JC Kerkrade	Free
31 May 2013^{1}	(Netherlands) Jeroen Drost	(Netherlands) RKC Waalwijk	(Netherlands) NAC Breda	Free
31 May 2013^{1}	(Netherlands) Mitch Apau	Unattached	(Netherlands) RKC Waalwijk	Free
3 June 2013^{1}	(Denmark) Dennis Rommedahl	(Denmark) Brøndby IF	(Netherlands) RKC Waalwijk	Free
3 June 2013^{1}	(Netherlands) Lars Lambooij	Unattached	(Netherlands) Go Ahead Eagles	Free
3 June 2013^{1}	(Netherlands) Joeri Schroyen	(Netherlands) Fortuna Sittard	(Netherlands) Go Ahead Eagles	Free
4 June 2013^{1}	(Netherlands) Mitchell Dijks	(Netherlands) Ajax	(Netherlands) SC Heerenveen	Loan
3 June 2013^{1}	(Netherlands) Henk Dijkhuizen	(Netherlands) Sparta Rotterdam	(Netherlands) Roda JC Kerkrade	Free
3 June 2013^{1}	(Netherlands) Ruud Swinkels	Unattached	(Netherlands) SC Cambuur	Free
4 June 2013^{1}	(Sweden) Emir Bajrami	(Netherlands) FC Twente	(Greece) Panathinaikos	Free
4 June 2013^{1}	(Netherlands) Kevin Wattamaleo	(Netherlands) NEC Nijmegen	(Netherlands) FC Volendam	Free
5 June 2013^{1}	(Ghana) Nana Akwasi Asare	(Netherlands) FC Utrecht	(Belgium) Gent	Undisclosed
5 June 2013^{1}	(Belgium) Kevin Begois	(Netherlands) FC Den Bosch	(Netherlands) PEC Zwolle	Free
5 June 2013^{1}	(Netherlands) Ryan Babel	(Netherlands) Ajax	(Turkey) Kasımpaşa Spor Kulübü	Free
6 June 2013^{1}	(Netherlands) Chiel Kramer	(Netherlands) Ajax	(Netherlands) SC Heerenveen	Free
7 June 2013^{1}	(Netherlands) Marc Höcher	(Netherlands) Willem II	(Netherlands) Roda JC Kerkrade	Free
7 June 2013^{1}	(Netherlands) Roderick Gielisse	(Netherlands) ADO Den Haag	(Netherlands) Sparta Rotterdam	Free
8 June 2013^{1}	(Netherlands) Jeff Stans	(Netherlands) RKC Waalwijk	(Netherlands) SBV Excelsior	Free
9 June 2013^{1}	(Serbia) Nemanja Gudelj	(Netherlands) NAC Breda	(Netherlands) AZ Alkmaar	€3,000,000
10 June 2013^{1}	(Netherlands) Doke Schmidt	(Netherlands) SC Heerenveen	(Netherlands) Go Ahead Eagles	Loan
11 June 2013^{1}	(Netherlands) Jeffrey Rijsdijk	(Netherlands) FC Dordrecht	(Netherlands) Go Ahead Eagles	Undisclosed
11 June 2013^{1}	(Netherlands) Leonard Nienhuis	(Netherlands) FC Groningen	(Netherlands) SC Cambuur	Free
11 June 2013^{1}	(Serbia) Miralem Sulejmani	(Netherlands) Ajax	(Portugal) Benfica	Free
12 June 2013^{1}	(Netherlands) Robbie Wielaert	(Netherlands) Roda JC Kerkrade	(Australia) Melbourne Heart	Free
13 June 2013^{1}	(France) Rémy Amieux	(Netherlands) NEC Nijmegen	(Netherlands) RKC Waalwijk	Free
13 June 2013^{1}	(Belgium) Jan Wuytens	(Netherlands) FC Utrecht	(Netherlands) AZ Alkmaar	Free
13 June 2013^{1}	(Netherlands) Leandro Bacuna	(Netherlands) FC Groningen	(England) Aston Villa	€1,000,000
14 June 2013^{1}	(Germany) Tobias Haitz	(Germany) Bayer Leverkusen II	(Netherlands) NEC Nijmegen	Free
14 June 2013^{1}	(Netherlands) Xandro Schenk	(Netherlands) Ajax	(Netherlands) Go Ahead Eagles	Free
14 June 2013^{1}	(Indonesia) Joey Suk	(Belgium) Beerschot AC	(Netherlands) NAC Breda	Free
14 June 2013^{1}	(Netherlands) Freek Heerkens	(Netherlands) Go Ahead Eagles	(Netherlands) Willem II	Free
14 June 2013^{1}	(Netherlands) Jasper Heusinkveld	(Netherlands) Go Ahead Eagles	(Netherlands) De Graafschap	Free
14 June 2013^{1}	(Netherlands) Harm Zeinstra	(Netherlands) FC Emmen	(Netherlands) SC Cambuur	Non-contract
14 June 2013^{1}	(Netherlands) Malcolm Esajas	(Netherlands) MVV Maastricht	(Netherlands) ADO Den Haag	Free
18 June 2013^{1}	(Netherlands) Jeremain Lens	(Netherlands) PSV Eindhoven	(Ukraine) FC Dynamo Kyiv	€9,000,000
19 June 2013^{1}	(Netherlands) Cendrino Misidjan	(Netherlands) Go Ahead Eagles	(Netherlands) Sparta Rotterdam	Free
20 June 2013^{1}	(Netherlands) Virgil van Dijk	(Netherlands) FC Groningen	(Scotland) Celtic	€3,000,000
20 June 2013^{1}	(Syria) Sanharib Malki	(Netherlands) Roda JC Kerkrade	(Turkey) Kasımpaşa Spor Kulübü	€1,500,000
21 June 2013^{1}	(Netherlands) Danny van den Meiracker	(Netherlands) NEC Nijmegen	(Netherlands) FC Oss	Free
21 June 2013^{1}	(Netherlands) Ramon Leeuwin	(Netherlands) ADO Den Haag	(Netherlands) SC Cambuur	Free
21 June 2013^{1}	(Netherlands) Ricky van Haaren	(Netherlands) VVV-Venlo	(Netherlands) ADO Den Haag	Undisclosed
21 June 2013^{1}	(Morocco) Ali Messaoud	(Netherlands) AZ Alkmaar	(Netherlands) Willem II	Free
23 June 2013^{1}	(Netherlands) Nick van der Velden	(Netherlands) NEC Nijmegen	(Netherlands) FC Groningen	Free
23 June 2013^{1}	(Netherlands) Paco van Moorsel	(Netherlands) FC Groningen	(Netherlands) SC Cambuur	Loan
24 June 2013^{1}	(Netherlands) Yanic Wildschut	(Netherlands) VVV-Venlo	(Netherlands) SC Heerenveen	€700,000
24 June 2013^{1}	(Norway) Magnus Wolff Eikrem	(Norway) Molde FK	(Netherlands) SC Heerenveen	€1,200,000
24 June 2013^{1}	(Belgium) Dries Mertens	(Netherlands) PSV Eindhoven	(Italy) Napoli	€9,700,000
25 June 2013^{1}	(Netherlands) Mats van Huijgevoort	(Netherlands) Feyenoord	(Netherlands) Willem II	Loan
25 June 2013^{1}	(Poland) Mateusz Klich	(Germany) VfL Wolfsburg	(Netherlands) PEC Zwolle	€200,000
26 June 2013^{1}	(Netherlands) Ruud Boymans	(Netherlands) AZ Alkmaar	(Netherlands) Willem II	Loan
27 June 2013^{1}	(Belgium) Sepp De Roover	(Belgium) Lokeren	(Netherlands) NAC Breda	Undisclosed
27 June 2013^{1}	(Morocco) Anouar Kali	(Netherlands) FC Utrecht	(Netherlands) Roda JC Kerkrade	Free
27 June 2013^{1}	(Netherlands) Florian Jozefzoon	(Netherlands) RKC Waalwijk	(Netherlands) PSV Eindhoven	Undisclosed
27 June 2013^{1}	(Netherlands) Jeffrey Bruma	(England) Chelsea	(Netherlands) PSV Eindhoven	€3,000,000
27 June 2013^{1}	(Netherlands) Mawouna Amevor	(Netherlands) FC Dordrecht	(Netherlands) Go Ahead Eagles	Undisclosed
27 June 2013^{1}	(Netherlands) Arsenio Valpoort	(Netherlands) SC Heerenveen	(Hungary) Ferencvárosi TC	Free
27 June 2013^{1}	(Netherlands) Furkan Alakmak	(Netherlands) RKC Waalwijk	(Turkey) Göztepe Izmir	Free
27 June 2013^{1}	(Belgium) Seydina Diarra	(Belgium) Anderlecht	(Netherlands) NEC Nijmegen	Free
28 June 2013^{1}	(Netherlands) Giliano Wijnaldum	(Netherlands) AZ Alkmaar	(Netherlands) FC Groningen	Free
28 June 2013^{1}	(Brazil) Eric Botteghin	(Netherlands) NAC Breda	(Netherlands) FC Groningen	€650,000
28 June 2013^{1}	(Netherlands) Marko Vejinović	(Netherlands) Heracles Almelo	(Netherlands) Vitesse Arnhem	Free
28 June 2013^{1}	(Netherlands) Bart van Brakel	(Netherlands) FC Den Bosch	(Netherlands) SC Cambuur	Free
28 June 2013^{1}	(Netherlands) Erik Pieters	(Netherlands) PSV Eindhoven	(England) Stoke City	€3,600,000
29 June 2013^{1}	(Netherlands) Charlton Vicento	(Netherlands) ADO Den Haag	(Greece) PAS Giannina	Free
29 June 2013^{1}	(Netherlands) Bryan Linssen	(Netherlands) VVV Venlo	(Netherlands) Heracles Almelo	Undisclosed
30 June 2013^{1}	(Netherlands) Adam Maher	(Netherlands) AZ Alkmaar	(Netherlands) PSV Eindhoven	€8,000,000
30 June 2013^{1}	(Netherlands) Danny Verbeek	(Belgium) Standard Liège	(Netherlands) NAC Breda	Loan
1 July 2013	(Netherlands) Melvin Platje	(Netherlands) NEC Nijmegen	(Azerbaijan) PFC Neftchi Baku	€200,000
2 July 2013	(Netherlands) Rick ten Voorde	(Netherlands) NEC Nijmegen	(Germany) SC Paderborn 07	Undisclosed
2 July 2013	(Netherlands) Kelvin Leerdam	(Netherlands) Feyenoord	(Netherlands) Vitesse Arnhem	Free
2 July 2013	(Netherlands) Norair Mamedov	(Netherlands) PEC Zwolle	(Netherlands) Willem II	Free
3 July 2013	(Netherlands) Daryl van Mieghem	(Netherlands) Heracles Almelo	(Netherlands) SC Telstar	Free
4 July 2013	(Netherlands) Marco van Ginkel	(Netherlands) Vitesse Arnhem	(England) Chelsea	€9,400,000
5 July 2013	(Belgium) Gill Swerts	(Denmark) SønderjyskE	(Netherlands) NAC Breda	Free
5 July 2013	(Netherlands) Rydell Poepon	(Netherlands) ADO Den Haag	(Netherlands) NAC Breda	Loan
5 July 2013	(Netherlands) Khalid Sinouh	(Netherlands) NEC Nijmegen	(Netherlands) Sparta Rotterdam	Free
5 July 2013	(Netherlands) Romeo Castelen	(Russia) FC Volga Nizhny Novgorod	(Netherlands) RKC Waalwijk	Free
5 July 2013	(France) Jean-David Beauguel	Unattached	(Netherlands) RKC Waalwijk	Free
5 July 2013	(Netherlands) Leroy George	(Netherlands) NEC Nijmegen	(Azerbaijan) Qarabağ FK	Free
5 July 2013	(Netherlands) Mike van der Hoorn	(Netherlands) FC Utrecht	(Netherlands) Ajax	Undisclosed
6 July 2013	(Spain) Bojan Krkic	(Spain) Barcelona	(Netherlands) Ajax	Loan
6 July 2013	(Netherlands) Ninos Gouriye	(Netherlands) Heracles Almelo	(Netherlands) ADO Den Haag	Undisclosed
6 July 2013	(Netherlands) Frank Demouge	(England) AFC Bournemouth	(Netherlands) Roda JC Kerkrade	Free
7 July 2013	(Netherlands) Patrick van Aanholt	(England) Chelsea	(Netherlands) Vitesse Arnhem	Loan
7 July 2013	(Netherlands) Jens Janse	(Netherlands) NAC Breda	(Spain) Córdoba CF	Free
7 July 2013	(Netherlands) Mikhail Rosheuvel	(Netherlands) AZ Alkmaar	(Netherlands) Heracles Almelo	Loan
8 July 2013	(Portugal) Daniel Fernandes	(Netherlands) FC Twente	(Greece) OFI	Loan
8 July 2013	(England) Michael Higdon	(Scotland) Motherwell FC	(Netherlands) NEC Nijmegen	Free
8 July 2013	(Netherlands) Karim Rekik	(England) Manchester City	(Netherlands) PSV Eindhoven	Loan
9 July 2013	(United States) Jozy Altidore	(Netherlands) AZ Alkmaar	(England) Sunderland	€10,000,000
10 July 2013	(Luxembourg) Aurélien Joachim	(Luxembourg) F91 Dudelange	(Netherlands) RKC Waalwijk	Free
10 July 2013	(Netherlands) Frank Olijve	(Netherlands) PEC Zwolle	(Netherlands) FC Emmen	Free
11 July 2013	(Netherlands) Kees Luijckx	(Netherlands) NAC Breda	(Netherlands) Roda JC Kerkrade	Free
12 July 2013	(Netherlands) Kees Kwakman	(Netherlands) FC Groningen	(Netherlands) NAC Breda	Free
12 July 2013	(Ivory Coast) Wilfried Bony	(Netherlands) Vitesse Arnhem	(England) Swansea City	€14,000,000
13 July 2013	(Netherlands) Leroy Fer	(Netherlands) FC Twente	(England) Norwich City	€5,500,000
13 July 2013	(Netherlands) Stijn Schaars	Sporting Clube de Portugal	(Netherlands) PSV Eindhoven	€800,000
13 July 2013	(Colombia) Santiago Arias	Sporting Clube de Portugal	(Netherlands) PSV Eindhoven	€800,000
14 July 2013	(Netherlands) Norichio Nieveld	(Netherlands) PEC Zwolle	(Netherlands) FC Eindhoven	Free
15 July 2013	(Netherlands) Guyon Fernandez	(Netherlands) Feyenoord	(Netherlands) PEC Zwolle	Loan
16 July 2013	(Netherlands) Oussama Tannane	(Netherlands) SC Heerenveen	(Netherlands) Heracles Almelo	Free
16 July 2013	(Netherlands) Mitchell Schet	(Netherlands) FC Groningen	(Netherlands) ADO Den Haag	Undisclosed
16 July 2013	(Denmark) Oliver Feldballe	(Denmark) Randers FC	(Netherlands) SC Cambuur	Free
16 July 2013	(Netherlands) Kevin Strootman	(Netherlands) PSV Eindhoven	(Italy) AS Roma	€17,000,000
17 July 2013	(Netherlands) Marlon Pereira	(Bulgaria) Botev Plovdiv	(Netherlands) SC Cambuur	Free
17 July 2013	(Netherlands) Douglas	(Netherlands) FC Twente	(Russia) Dinamo Moscow	Free
17 July 2013	(Finland) Aleksei Kangaskolkka	(Sweden) Jönköpings Södra IF	(Netherlands) Heracles Almelo	Free
18 July 2013	(Netherlands) Boy Waterman	(Netherlands) PSV Eindhoven	(Turkey) Karabükspor	Free
19 July 2013	(Belgium) Timothy Derijck	(Netherlands) PSV Eindhoven	(Netherlands) FC Utrecht	Loan
22 July 2013	(Netherlands) Jerson Cabral	(Netherlands) FC Twente	(Netherlands) ADO Den Haag	Loan
23 July 2013	(Hungary) Krisztian Adorjan	(England) Liverpool	(Netherlands) FC Groningen	Loan
23 July 2013	(Netherlands) William Troost-Ekong	(England) Tottenham Hotspur	(Netherlands) FC Groningen	Free
23 July 2013	(Netherlands) Tjaronn Chery	(Netherlands) ADO Den Haag	(Netherlands) FC Groningen	Loan
23 July 2013	(Netherlands) Tim Bakens	(Netherlands) SC Cambuur	(Netherlands) De Graafschap	Free
24 July 2013	(Romania) Catalin Tira	(Italy) Lazio Roma	(Netherlands) ADO Den Haag	Free
24 July 2013	(Netherlands) Dico Koppers	(Netherlands) Ajax	(Netherlands) FC Twente	€800,000
24 July 2013	(Hungary) Boldizsár Bodor	(Belgium) Beerschot AC	(Netherlands) NAC Breda	Free
24 July 2013	(Turkey) Nadir Çiftçi	(Netherlands) NAC Breda	(Scotland) Dundee United	Free
26 July 2013	(Belgium) Nacer Chadli	(Netherlands) FC Twente	(England) Tottenham Hotspur	€8,130,000
26 July 2013	(Netherlands) Joey Godee	(Belgium) Cercle Brugge	(Netherlands) Go Ahead Eagles	Loan
26 July 2013	(Netherlands) Erik Cummins	(Netherlands) FC Utrecht	(Netherlands) Go Ahead Eagles	Free
28 July 2013	(Netherlands) Cuco Martina	(Netherlands) RKC Waalwijk	(Netherlands) FC Twente	€350,000
30 July 2013	(Netherlands) Derk Boerrigter	(Netherlands) Ajax	(Scotland) Celtic	€3,500,000
30 July 2013	(Netherlands) Lion Kaak	(Netherlands) Go Ahead Eagles	(Spain) Valencia Mestalla	Free
30 July 2013	(Netherlands) Eloy Room	(Netherlands) Vitesse Arnhem	(Netherlands) Go Ahead Eagles	Loan
30 July 2013	(Czech Republic) Jan Šeda	(Czech Republic) FK Mladá Boleslav	(Netherlands) RKC Waalwijk	Loan
30 July 2013	(Canada) Atiba Hutchinson	(Netherlands) PSV Eindhoven	(Turkey) Besiktas Istanbul	Free
31 July 2013	(Ghana) Matthew Amoah	(Netherlands) SC Heerenveen	(Netherlands) Heracles Almelo	Free
1 August 2013	(Belgium) Steve De Ridder	(England) Southampton	(Netherlands) FC Utrecht	Free
1 August 2013	(Belgium) Jonas Ivens	(Netherlands) FC Groningen	(Netherlands) RKC Waalwijk	Loan
2 August 2013	(Netherlands) Jody Lukoki	(Netherlands) Ajax	(Netherlands) SC Cambuur	Loan
2 August 2013	(Sweden) Denni Avdic	(Germany) SV Werder Bremen	(Netherlands) AZ Alkmaar	€250,000
5 August 2013	(Netherlands) Kaj Ramsteijn	(Netherlands) Feyenoord	(Netherlands) Sparta Rotterdam	Loan
5 August 2013	(Belgium) Kenny Van Hoevelen	(Belgium) KV Mechelen	(Netherlands) RKC Waalwijk	Loan
7 August 2013	(Netherlands) Edwin Gyasi	(Netherlands) FC Twente	(Netherlands) Heracles Almelo	Undisclosed
8 August 2013	(Chile) Cristián Cuevas	(England) Chelsea	(Netherlands) Vitesse Arnhem	Loan
8 August 2013	(Netherlands) Yoëll van Nieff	(Netherlands) FC Groningen	(Netherlands) FC Dordrecht	Loan
8 August 2013	(South Korea) Park Ji-sung	(England) Queens Park Rangers	(Netherlands) PSV Eindhoven	Loan
9 August 2013	(Brazil) Lucas Piazón	(England) Chelsea	(Netherlands) Vitesse Arnhem	Loan
15 August 2013	(Netherlands) Erik Falkenburg	(Netherlands) AZ Alkmaar	(Netherlands) Go Ahead Eagles	Loan
15 August 2013	(Sweden) Samuel Armenteros	(Belgium) RSC Anderlecht	(Netherlands) Feyenoord	Loan
15 August 2013	(Netherlands) Gianni Zuiverloon	(Spain) Real Mallorca	(Netherlands) ADO Den Haag	Free
19 August 2013	(Belgium) Stefano Marzo	Unattached	(Netherlands) SC Heerenveen	Free
20 August 2013	(Bosnia and Herzegovina) Adnan Secerovic	(Netherlands) Roda JC	(Netherlands) MVV	Loan
21 August 2013	(Norway) Marcus Pedersen	(Netherlands) Vitesse Arnhem	(England) Barnsley	Loan
22 August 2013	(Denmark) Mathias Gehrt	(Denmark) Brondby IF	(Netherlands) ADO Den Haag	Undisclosed
22 August 2013	(Netherlands) Anass Achahbar	(Netherlands) Feyenoord	(Germany) Arminia Bielefeld	Loan
23 August 2013	(Netherlands) Willem Janssen	(Netherlands) FC Twente	(Netherlands) FC Utrecht	Loan
23 August 2013	(Netherlands) Leon de Kogel	(Netherlands) FC Utrecht	(Netherlands) VVV Venlo	Loan
28 August 2013	(Croatia) Stipe Perica	(England) Chelsea	(Netherlands) NAC Breda	Loan
29 August 2013	(Denmark) Christian Eriksen	(Netherlands) Ajax	(England) Tottenham Hotspur	€10,000,000
30 August 2013	(Nigeria) Uche Nwofor	(Netherlands) VVV Venlo	(Netherlands) SC Heerenveen	Loan
31 August 2013	(Belgium) Toby Alderweireld	(Netherlands) Ajax	(Spain) Atlético Madrid	€7,000,000
31 August 2013	(Netherlands) Lerin Duarte	(Netherlands) Heracles Almelo	(Netherlands) Ajax	Undisclosed
1 September 2013	(Ghana) Christian Atsu	(England) Chelsea	(Netherlands) Vitesse Arnhem	Loan
1 September 2013	(Netherlands) Youness Mokhtar	(Netherlands) PEC Zwolle	(Netherlands) FC Twente	Undisclosed
1 September 2013	(Portugal) Francisco Júnior	(England) Everton	(Netherlands) Vitesse Arnhem	Loan
1 September 2013	(Netherlands) Glynor Plet	(Netherlands) FC Twente	Unattached	Released
2 September 2013	(Netherlands) Joshua John	(Netherlands) FC Twente	(Denmark) FC Nordsjælland	€600,000
2 September 2013	(Germany) Simon Cziommer	Unattached	(Netherlands) Heracles Almelo	Free
2 September 2013	(Slovakia) Samuel Štefánik	(Slovakia) AS Trenčín	(Netherlands) NEC Nijmegen	Undisclosed
2 September 2013	(Austria) Jakob Jantscher	(Austria) Sturm Graz	(Netherlands) NEC Nijmegen	Undisclosed
2 September 2013	(Belgium) Marnick Vermijl	(England) Manchester United	(Netherlands) NEC Nijmegen	Loan
2 September 2013	(Belgium) Sven Kums	(Netherlands) SC Heerenveen	(Belgium) Zulte Waregem	Undisclosed
2 September 2013	(Belgium) Leroy Labylle	(Netherlands) MVV Maastricht	(Netherlands) PEC Zwolle	Undisclosed
2 September 2013	(Netherlands) Joeri de Kamps	(Netherlands) Ajax	(Netherlands) SC Heerenveen	Loan
2 September 2013	(Netherlands) Matthew Steenvoorden	(Netherlands) Feyenoord	(Netherlands) FC Dordrecht	Loan
2 September 2013	(England) Sam Hutchinson	(England) Chelsea	(Netherlands) Vitesse Arnhem	Loan
2 September 2013	(Netherlands) Lucas Woudenberg	(Netherlands) Feyenoord	(Netherlands) Excelsior Rotterdam	Loan
2 September 2013	(Netherlands) Roland Alberg	(Turkey) Elazigspor	(Netherlands) ADO Den Haag	Undisclosed
2 September 2013	(Ivory Coast) Wilfried Kanon	(Romania) Corona Brasov	(Netherlands) ADO Den Haag	Undisclosed
2 September 2013	(Netherlands) Ilias Bel Hassani	(Netherlands) Sparta Rotterdam	(Netherlands) Heracles Almelo	Undisclosed

== Notes ==
1. Transfer will take place on 1 July 2013.
