= Adil Auassar =

Dutch footballer

Personal information
- Date of birth: 6 October 1986 (age 40)
- Place of birth: Dordrecht, Netherlands
- Height: 1.87 m (6 ft 2 in)
- Positions: Centre back; defensive midfielder

Youth career
- Groote Lindt
- Sparta
- Dordrecht

Senior career*
Years	Team	Apps	(Gls)
2005–2007	Dordrecht	45	(3)
2007–2010	VVV-Venlo	69	(5)
2010–2012	Feyenoord	3	(0)
2011–2012	→ RKC (loan)	19	(1)
2012–2013	De Graafschap	25	(2)
2013–2016	Excelsior	98	(9)
2016–2018	Roda JC	58	(4)
2018–2023	Sparta	149	(7)
Total		466	(31)
- * Club domestic league appearances and goals

Adil Auassar (born 6 October 1986) is a Dutch former professional footballer.

== Early life ==
Auassar was born in Dordrecht, South Holland, the Netherlands. He grew up in Zwijndrecht, South Holland, and has two older brothers and one younger sister.

== Club career ==
=== Youth career ===
Auassar started his youth career at local Zwijndrecht club Groote Lindt. At the age of 14, Auassar switched to Sparta Rotterdam's amateur side. He played for Sparta Rotterdam for three seasons, after which FC Dordrecht offered the young player a professional contract.

=== FC Dordrecht (2005–2007) ===
Auassar made his professional debut after the winter break of the season 2005–06. On 13 January 2006, he replaced Bart van Muyen in the 90th minute of the Eerste Divisie away match against FC Volendam (1–1). Auassar quickly became a first team regular and played a total of 11 matches in his first season. Auassar scored his first professional goal in his second season. On 1 September 2006, Auassar scored one goal in the away win against Fortuna Sittard (0–4). Auassar played a total of 30 matches in his second season, scoring three goals. He played an important role in FC Dordrecht's promotion playoffs qualification, but the club was knocked out by RKC Waalwijk after a third decider match. Auassar's good performance didn't pass by unnoticed. Eerste Divisie champions VVV-Venlo picked up the midfielder in the beginning of the season 2007–08 to play on the highest level.

=== VVV-Venlo (2007–2010) ===
Auassar made his Eredivisie debut on 15 September 2007, in the lost away match against De Graafschap (3–2). VVV-Venlo relegated in its first season, but promoted again in the follow-up season.

=== Feyenoord (2010–2012) ===
On 5 March 2010, Feyenoord announced the arrival of Auassar on a free transfer. In 2011, he was loaned to the Dutch Eredivisie club RKC Waalwijk.

After a spell at De Graafschap, he moved to Excelsior. In summer 2016, Auassar signed a 3-year contract with Roda JC.

=== Sparta Rotterdam ===
In July 2018, he moved to Sparta Rotterdam on a 2-year deal.

Auassar announced his retirement from playing football professionally in 2023.
