= Hidde Jurjus =

Dutch footballer (born 1994)

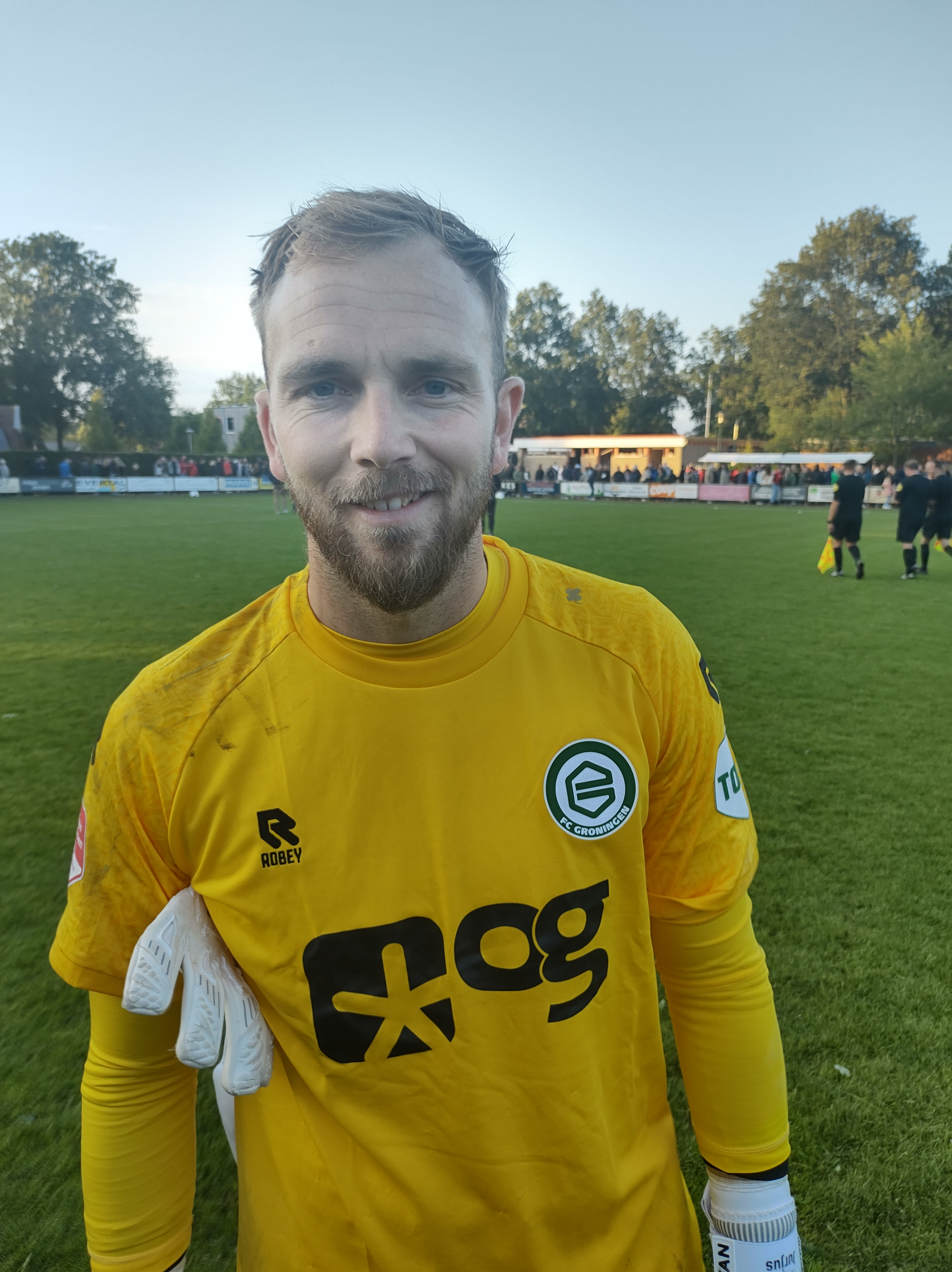
- Jurjus with Groningen in 2023

Personal information
- Date of birth: 9 February 1994 (age 32)
- Place of birth: Lichtenvoorde, Netherlands
- Height: 1.87 m (6 ft 2 in)
- Position: Goalkeeper

Team information
- Current team: Volendam
- Number: 1

Youth career
- 1999-2002: Longa '30
- 2002-2013: De Graafschap

Senior career*
Years	Team	Apps	(Gls)
2013–2016	De Graafschap	61	(0)
2016–2020	PSV	0	(0)
2016–2017	Jong PSV	17	(0)
2017–2018	→ Roda JC (loan)	34	(0)
2018–2020	→ De Graafschap (loan)	51	(0)
2020–2021	KFC Uerdingen 05	24	(0)
2021–2023	De Graafschap	75	(0)
2023–2026	Groningen	37	(0)
2026–	Volendam	0	(0)

International career^{‡}
2016	Netherlands U21	2	(0)
- * Club domestic league appearances and goals as of 19 May 2026 ‡ National team caps and goals as of 15 November 2016

Hidde Jurjus (born 9 February 1994) is a Dutch professional footballer who plays as a goalkeeper for Eerste Divisie club Volendam.

== Club career ==
=== Early life ===
After playing local side Longa '30, Hidde Jurjus joined the youth academy of De Graafschap in 2002, aged eight. From there he climbed through the ranks of the youth academy and was chosen as the 4th goalkeeper of the senior squad in the 2013–2014 season.

=== De Graafschap ===
The following season (2014–2015), manager Jan Vreman named Jurjus first goalkeeper, and he made his senior debut on 8 August 2014 against FC Emmen in the Jupiler League. After the first half, he got injured, and he was subbed off for Jasper Heusinkveld. On 28 October 2014 he recovered from his back injury and played his second game for De Graafschap. During the season, he would establish himself as the 1st goalkeeper and they ended on the 6th position in the Eerste Divisie. The 6th position means that they qualified for a spot in the 2014–15 Eredivisie#Promotion/relegation play-offs. Jurjus and De Graafschap won against Almere City, Go Ahead Eagles and FC Volendam, which means that they were officially promoted to the Eredivisie.

On 11 August 2015 Jurjus made his Eredivisie debut against SC Heerenveen. During the season he stays the first choice goalkeeper and he kept all 34 competition matches.

=== PSV ===
In the summer of 2016 PSV signed Jurjus from De Graafschap, and they came to a five-year agreement. PSV paid €500,000 for him. In PSV, he competes against Jeroen Zoet and Remko Pasveer for a position as first goalkeeper. In the 2016–2017 season he initially started as the 3rd choice goalkeeper. He plays half of the games in the Eerste Divisie with Jong PSV. At the end of the season Roda JC wanted to loan Jurjus from PSV, as their first goalkeeper Benjamin van Leer moved to Ajax.

=== Roda JC (loan) ===
During the 2017–2018 season, Jurjus was sent out on a loan with Roda JC. In this season he played all 34 league matches and with Roda JC he even reached the quarterfinals of the KNVB Beker. At the end of the season they ended on the 16th position, which means that they have to play in the relegation play-offs. Over two games, they lost against Almere City FC, which meant that they were officially relegated to the Eerste Divisie. After his loan spell at Roda JC, he returned to PSV.

=== De Graafschap (loan) ===
In the 2018 season, De Graafschap loaned Jurjus for one season. During the winter break, he injured his hamstring, which resulted in an early season end for Jurjus. He ended the season with 22 appearances, and de Graafschap got relegated as well.

Although most people won't call his first season as a loan player a success, De Graafschap expressed their wish to extend Jurjus' loan for another season. The following season, he played all matches. With 10 clean sheets, he helped De Graafschap secure the second place in the Eerste Divisie.

=== KFC Uerdingen 05 ===
On 27 August 2020, he signed a two-year contract with the German club KFC Uerdingen 05.

=== Back to De Graafschap ===
Jurjus returned to De Graafschap on 4 June 2021, signing a two-year contract with his childhood club.

=== Groningen ===
In June 2023, Jurjus signed for recently relegated Eerste Divisie club Groningen on a two-year contract with the option for a further year.

=== Volendam ===
In July 2026, Jurjus committed to Volendam for three seasons.

== Career statistics ==
As of match played 18 May 2025

Appearances and goals by club, season and competition
Club	Season	League			National cup		Other		Total	
Club	Season	Division	Apps	Goals	Apps	Goals	Apps	Goals	Apps	Goals
De Graafschap	2014–15	Eerste Divisie	27	0	2	0	6 (Note: Appearances in Eerste Divisie promotion play offs.)	0	35	0
De Graafschap	2015–16	Eredivisie	34	0	1	0	4	0	39	0
De Graafschap	Total		61	0	3	0	10	0	74	0
PSV Eindhoven	2016–17	Eredivisie	0	0	0	0	0	0	0	0
Jong PSV	2016–17	Eerste Divisie	17	0	0	0	0	0	17	0
Roda JC Kerkrade (on loan)	2017–18	Eredivisie	34	0	4	0	2 (Note: Appearances in Eerste Divisie promotion play offs.)	0	40	0
De Graafschap (on loan)	2018–19	Eredivisie	22	0	0	0	—		22	0
De Graafschap (on loan)	2019–20	Eerste Divisie	29	0	1	0	—		30	0
De Graafschap (on loan)	Total		102	0	5	0	2	0	107	0
KFC Uerdingen 05	2020–21	3. Liga	24	0	0	0	—		24	0
De Graafschap	2021–22	Eerste Divisie	38	0	1	0	2 (Note: Appearances in Eerste Divisie promotion play offs.)	0	41	0
De Graafschap	2022–23	Eerste Divisie	37	0	3	0	—		40	0
De Graafschap	Total		75	0	4	0	2	0	81	0
FC Groningen	2023–24	Eerste Divisie	28	0	5	0	—		33	0
FC Groningen	2024–25	Eredivisie	2	0	2	0	—		4	0
FC Groningen	Total		30	0	7	0	—		37	0
Career total			292	0	19	0	14	0	323	0
