= Davy Klaassen =

Dutch footballer (born 1993)

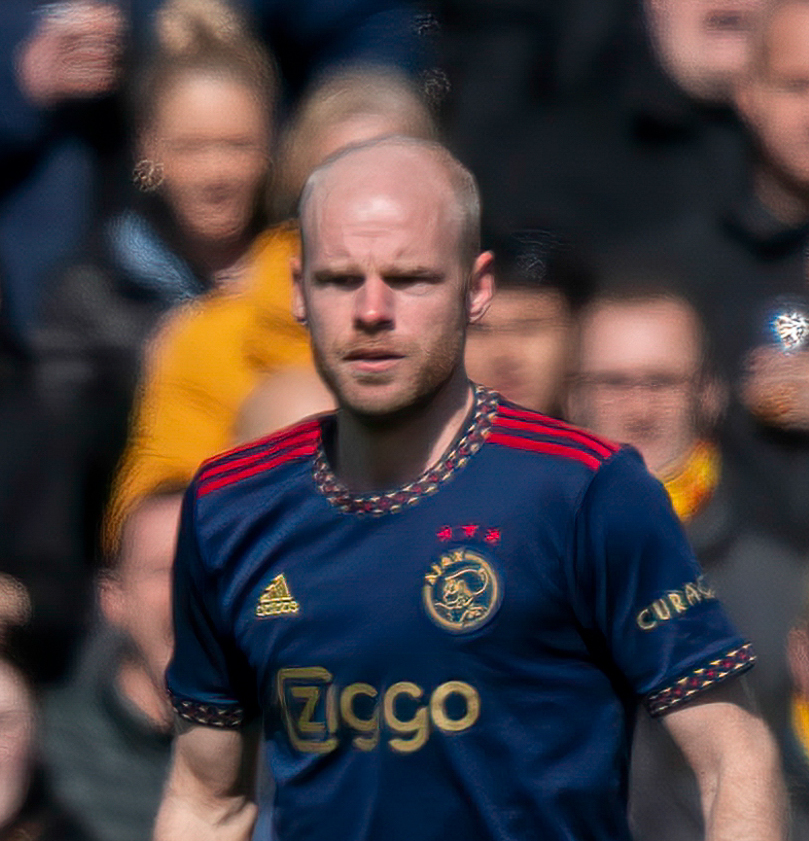
- Klaassen playing for Ajax in 2023

Personal information
- Full name: Davy Klaassen
- Date of birth: 21 February 1993 (age 33)
- Place of birth: Hilversum, Netherlands
- Height: 1.81 m (5 ft 11 in)
- Position: Midfielder

Team information
- Current team: Ajax
- Number: 18

Youth career
- 1999–2003: HVV de Zebra's
- 2003–2004: HSV Wasmeer
- 2004–2012: Ajax

Senior career*
Years	Team	Apps	(Gls)
2011–2017	Ajax	126	(44)
2013	Jong Ajax	6	(1)
2017–2018	Everton	7	(0)
2018–2020	Werder Bremen	69	(12)
2020–2023	Ajax	95	(30)
2023–2024	Inter Milan	13	(0)
2024–	Ajax	72	(16)

International career
2008–2009	Netherlands U16	5	(4)
2009–2010	Netherlands U17	11	(1)
2010–2011	Netherlands U19	9	(2)
2013	Netherlands U21	4	(0)
2014–2023	Netherlands	41	(10)
- * Club domestic league appearances and goals as of 18:44, 25 October 2026 (UTC)

Davy Klaassen (born 21 February 1993) is a Dutch professional footballer who plays as a midfielder for and captains Eredivisie club Ajax.

== Club career ==
=== Early career ===
Klaassen began his football career in the youth ranks of local amateur side HVV de Zebra's, where he played until 2003, when he transferred to HSV Wasmeer. A year later he was recruited into the famed Ajax Youth Academy. While playing for the Ajax A1 youth squad in 2011–12, Klaassen helped his side to win the Nike Eredivisie league title, as well as finishing as runners-up to Inter Milan in the NextGen Series (the Champions League equivalent for under-19 teams) after losing on penalties (5–3) following a 1–1 deadlock after extra time.

=== Ajax ===
Klaassen made his debut for the first team in the UEFA Champions League group stage away draw (0–0) against Olympique Lyonnais on 22 November 2011 replacing Lorenzo Ebecilio in the 85th minute. While still competing in the A-Juniors Nike Eredivisie league competing for the Ajax A1 under-19 squad, he made his Eredivisie debut on 27 November as a substitute against NEC and scored only 42 seconds after having been subbed on. He made his debut in the starting XI of the Ajax first team on 11 December 2011, due to starting center midfielder Theo Janssen catching the flu. Klaassen played the entire match, which ended in a 0–1 away win for Ajax against RKC Waalwijk.

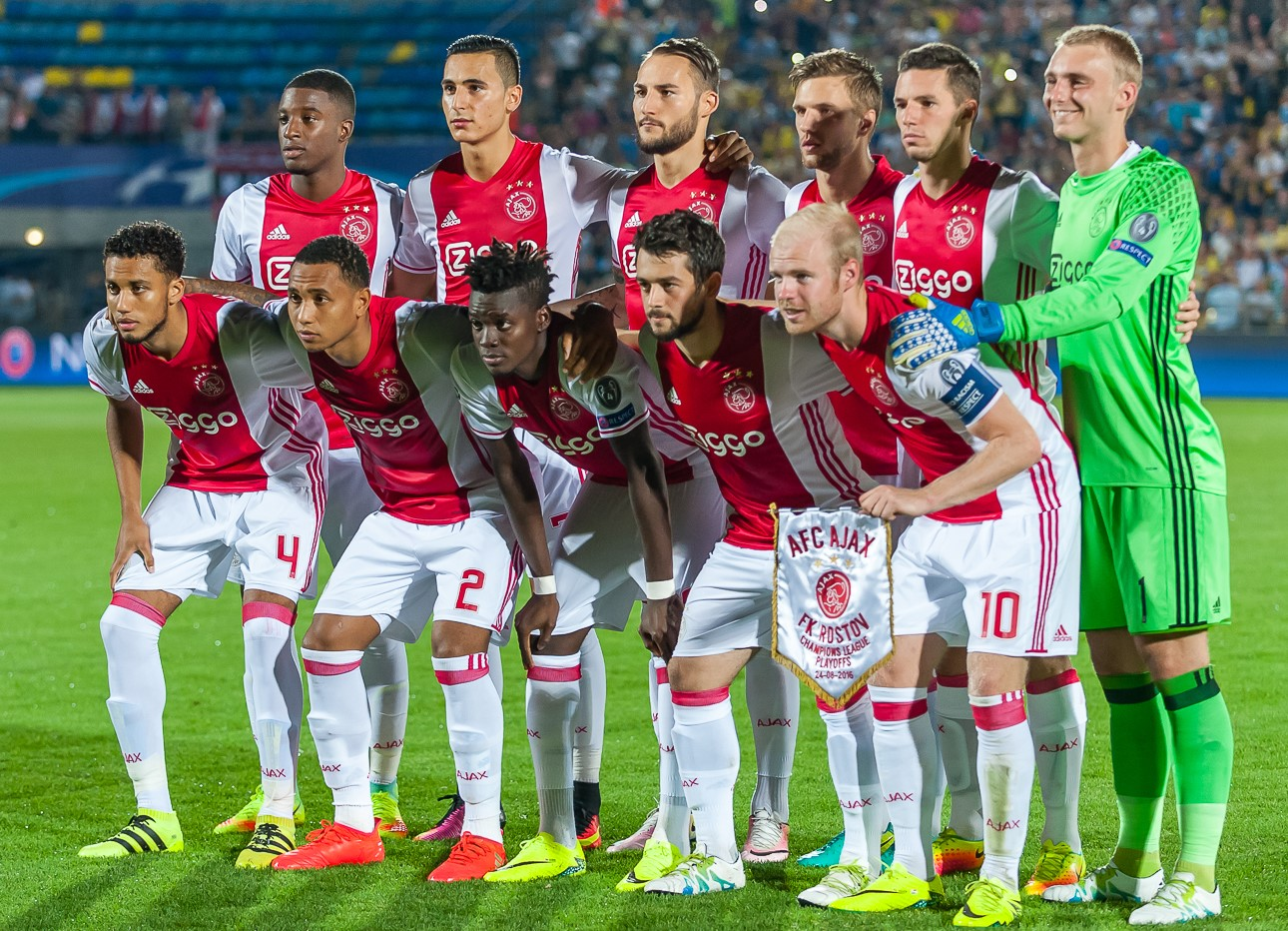
Klaassen (bottom row, far right) captaining Ajax in 2016

On 5 August 2013, Klaassen made his debut in the Eerste Divisie in a 2–0 win against Telstar while playing for the newly promoted reserves team Jong Ajax, in what would be the first match ever in the 2nd tier of professional football for the reserves. He scored his first goal for Jong Ajax on 20 September 2013 in a 1–2 away victory against FC Eindhoven. On 6 October 2013, while playing for the Ajax first team, he scored his side's second goal in the 59th minute in a 3–0 home win against Utrecht. On 7 December 2013, Klaassen scored his first hat-trick while playing for the senior team, in a 4–0 victory at home over NAC Breda, taking home the match ball and earning himself the Man of the Match award. Following the departure of Ajax captain Siem de Jong, Klaassen switched to the vacant number 10 shirt for the upcoming season.

For the 2015–16 season, Klaassen was named Ajax' captain, replacing the departed Niklas Moisander.

=== Everton ===
On 15 June 2017, Klaassen signed for Premier League side Everton on a five-year deal worth £23.6 million. He was handed the number 20 jersey at his new club for the 2017–18 season. He made his first official appearance for Everton in a 1–0 win over MFK Ružomberok in the UEFA Europa League third qualifying round first leg. Klaassen made his league debut for Everton on 12 August 2017, when his club beat Stoke City 1–0 at Goodison Park.

Klaassen endured a difficult season with the club, falling out of favor with both Sam Allardyce and Marco Silva after Ronald Koeman was fired in October 2017. Between late September 2017 and early March 2018, he failed to make a Premier League appearance. At the end of the January transfer window, Klaassen neared a loan move to Napoli, although the move would never materialize. Allardyce claimed the deal collapsed as a result of an image rights dispute between the player and the Italian club, although Klaassen would later reject this statement. Ahead of his summer move to Werder Bremen, Klaassen expressed his desire to prove his worth for the following season. Klaassen stated that he struggled to adapt to the different style of play in the Premier League, hence his struggles with the club.

=== Werder Bremen ===
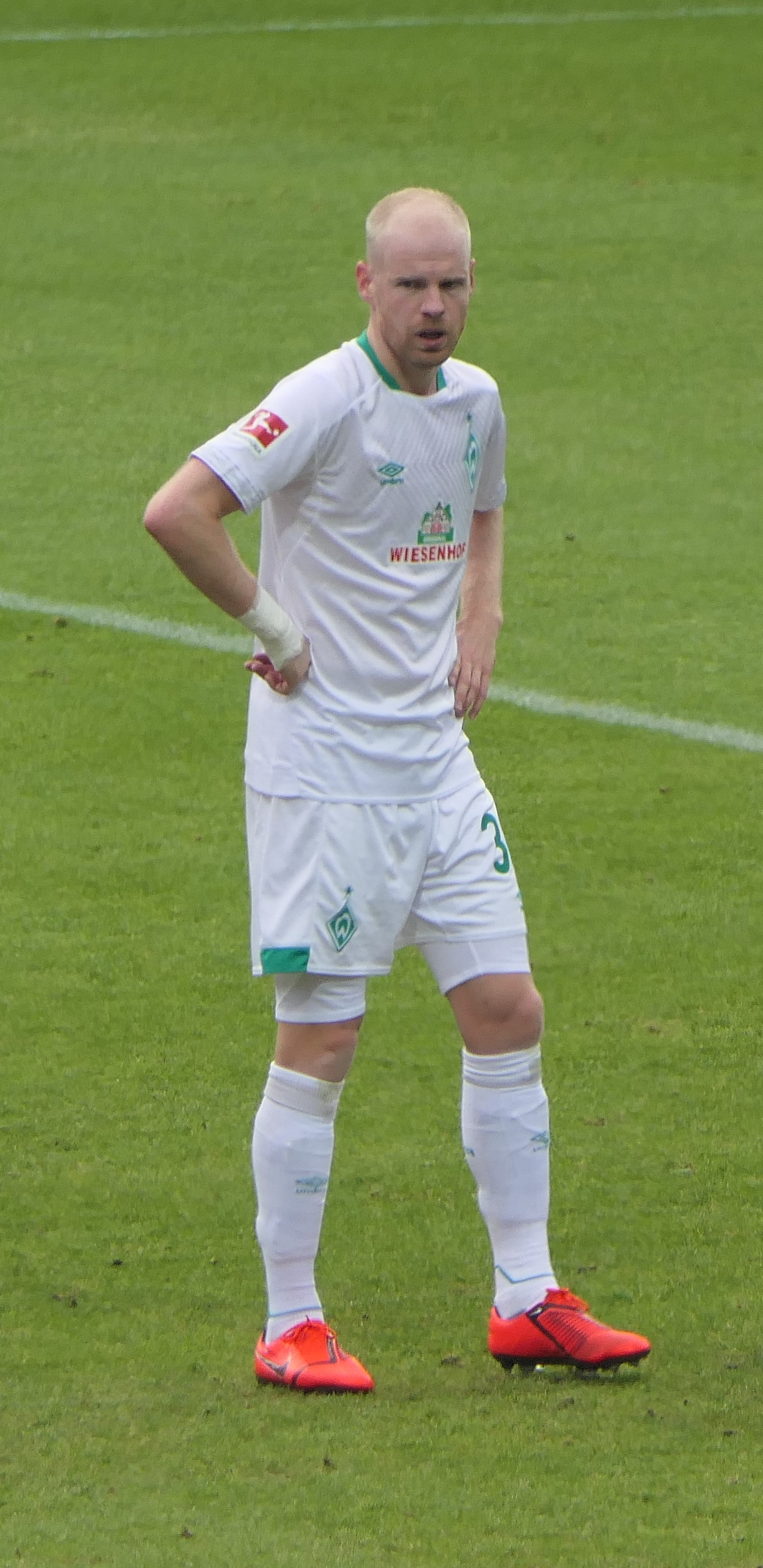
Klaassen with Werder Bremen in 2019

On 27 July 2018, Klaassen joined Werder Bremen on a four-year deal while the transfer fee paid to Everton was reported as €13.5 million (£12 million). He quickly established himself as a key player for the club, making 38 appearances and scoring 7 goals in his first season. His performances earned him the vice-captaincy for the 2019–20 season. In the relegation play-off that season, Klaassen played an important role in helping Werder Bremen secure their Bundesliga status by captaining the team in a 2–2 draw with Heidenheim. Following this, Klaassen returned to Ajax in October 2020.

=== Return to Ajax ===
On 5 October 2020, Klaassen rejoined Ajax on a contract until 30 June 2024, with a transfer fee which could rise to €14 million. He quickly re-established himself as a vital part of the Ajax midfield, helping them to secure the Eredivisie title in both the 2020–21 and 2021–22 seasons.

On 5 April 2023, during a Dutch cup semifinal away against Feyenoord, Klaassen suffered a head injury when he was struck by an object thrown from the stands. The incident caused a 30-minute delay and he was substituted shortly after the resumption, gesturing that he was suffering from dizziness.

=== Inter Milan ===
On 1 September 2023, Klaassen signed as a free agent for Italian club Inter Milan, on a two-year contract. Although still under contract with Ajax for one more year, the Dutch side amicably decided to mutually end the contract, out of respect for his career, and to easily facilitate his transfer to Inter. During his time with the Nerazzurri, Klaassen made 18 appearances in all competitions, contributing to the team's victory in the 2023–24 Serie A, their 20th title. He left the club at the end of the season.

=== Third stint at Ajax ===
On 17 September 2024, Klaassen rejoined Ajax on a one-year contract. On 16 February 2025, he scored his 100th official goal for Ajax in a 4–0 win over Heracles Almelo.

He made his 400th appearance for the club in their 3–1 victory over Shelbourne in the third qualifying round of the UEFA Conference League on 6 August 2026.

== International career ==
=== Youth ===
Klaassen made his debut for the Dutch national team at youth levels, debuting for the Netherlands U-16 team on 28 October 2008 in the 10th edition of the Tournoi Val de Marne '08 in the 3–0 victory over Italy U-16, while scoring the second goal for the Netherlands in his first international encounter. Klaassen scored in his second appearance for the Netherlands U-16 in the same tournament as well in 0–1 win over France U-16. In total Klaassen made 5 appearances for the Netherlands U-16 while scoring 4 goals. Scoring two more goals in friendly encounters against Ukraine U-16 and Ireland U-16 as well. On 22 September 2009, Klaassen made his first appearance for the Netherlands U17 team in a friendly encounter against France U17 which ended in a 1–0 loss for the Dutch. On 3 March 2010, he scored his first goal for the under-17 side in his 8th appearance, a friendly match against Greece U17. He also played a major role in the Netherlands qualifying campaign ahead of the 2010 UEFA European Under-17 Football Championship as well as playing in the 2009 edition of La Manga Cup. On 2 September 2010, Klaassen made his debut for the Netherlands U19 team in a friendly match against Germany U19 which ended in a 2–2 draw. In his 7th appearance for the under-19 side he scored both his first and second goal on 10 November 2011 in a qualification match ahead of the 2012 UEFA European Under-19 Championship against Moldova U19 with the Netherlands failing to qualify for the final tournament in Estonia.

Due to injuries sustained by Ruben Ligeon, Yassin Ayoub and Jürgen Locadia for the Netherlands U21 selection, Klaassen received his first call-up for Jong Oranje the under-21 selection of the Netherlands as a replacement along with Thomas Bruns and Timo Letschert for the 2015 UEFA European Under-21 Football Championship qualification match against Georgia U21, as well as the friendly match against Austria U21 four days later. He made his debut for the under-21 side on 10 October 2013 in that qualification match helping the Dutch to defeat Georgia 6–0 in which he replaced Luc Castaignos in the 81st minute of the match.

=== Senior ===
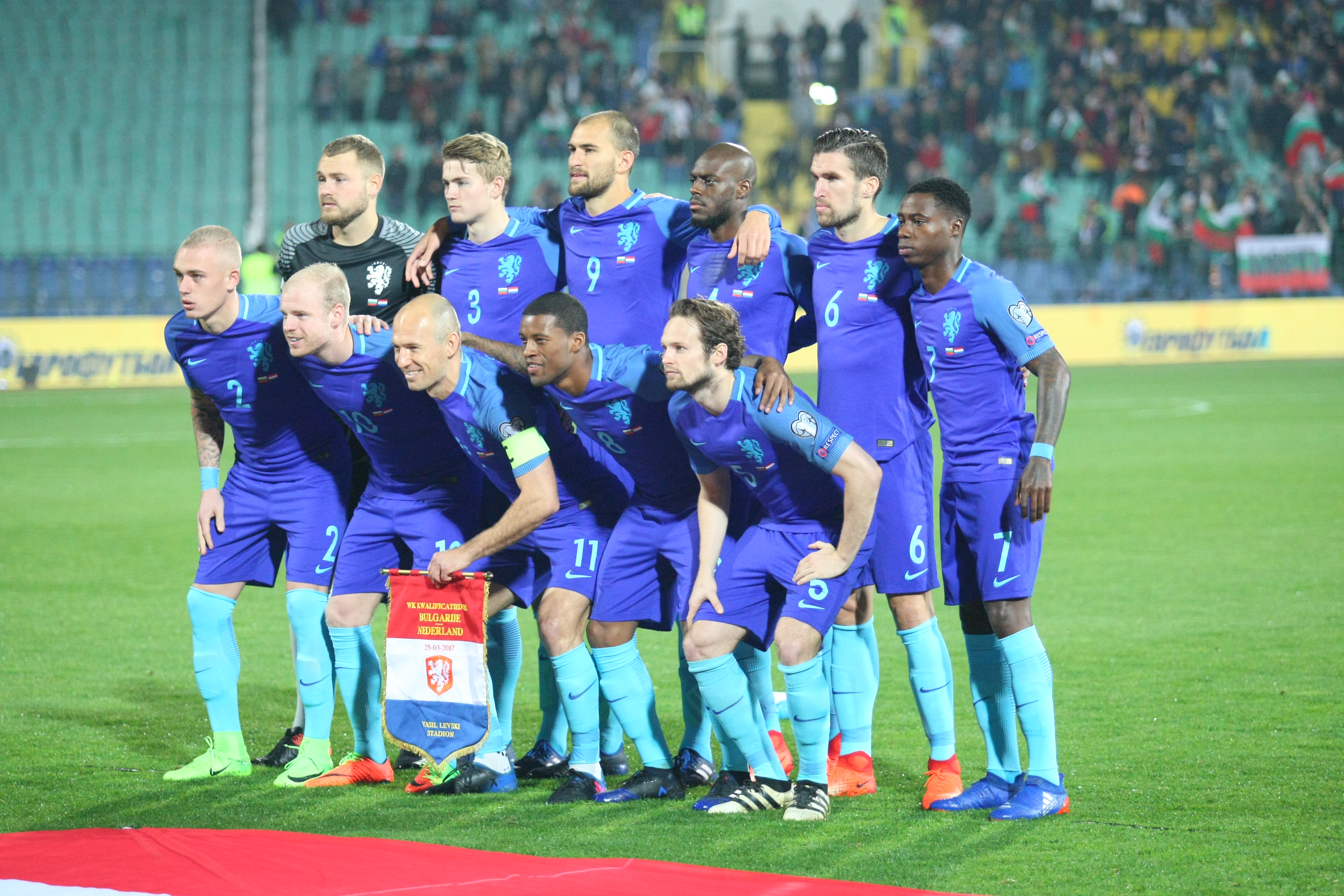
Klaassen (second from left, bottom row) with the Netherlands in 2017

On 5 March 2014, Klaassen made his debut for the Netherlands first team under head coach Louis van Gaal at the Stade de France in Paris, in a friendly match against France ahead of the 2014 FIFA World Cup. He was substituted on in the 72nd minute for Wesley Sneijder, as the Netherlands lost the match 2–0. While making his debut for the Netherlands, Klaassen became the 100th player to make his debut for the Dutch national team while playing his club football at Ajax.

On 31 March 2015, Klaassen scored his first international goal in a 2–0 win over Spain in a friendly match.

In November 2020, Klaassen was recalled to the Netherlands squad for the first time in over three years. He appeared as a second-half substitute in a friendly draw with Spain, before starting in UEFA Nations League fixtures against Bosnia & Herzegovina and Poland.

In June 2021, Klaassen was included in the Netherlands' squad for UEFA Euro 2020 but did not make an appearance in the tournament.

In November 2022, Klaassen was named in the Netherlands' squad for the 2022 FIFA World Cup. He scored in the team's opening match, a 2–0 win over Senegal. He was named Player of the Match in the team's final group match against Qatar.

== Style of play ==
Klaassen's nickname is "kaasstengel" ("cheese straw") due to his physical appearance. Another nickname is "Mister 1-0" due to him often scoring the first goal of a match. On the signing of the former Ajax captain, then-Everton manager Ronald Koeman was quoted saying Klaassen was a leader on the pitch. Koeman further described Klaassen's as a player that “is hardworking, likes to press and, of course, will give us more creativity and goals".

== Career statistics ==
=== Club ===
As of match played 25 October 2026

Appearances and goals by club, season and competition
Club	Season	League			National cup (Note: Includes KNVB Cup, DFB-Pokal, Coppa Italia)		League cup (Note: Includes EFL Cup)		Europe		Other		Total	
Club	Season	Division	Apps	Goals	Apps	Goals	Apps	Goals	Apps	Goals	Apps	Goals	Apps	Goals
Ajax	2011–12	Eredivisie	4	1	0	0	—		3 (Note: Two appearances in UEFA Champions League, one appearance in UEFA Europa League)	0	0	0	7	1
Ajax	2012–13	Eredivisie	2	0	0	0	—		0	0	1 (Note: Appearance in Johan Cruyff Shield)	0	3	0
Ajax	2013–14	Eredivisie	26	10	5	0	—		5 (Note: Three appearances and one goal in UEFA Champions League, two appearances in UEFA Europa League)	1	0	0	36	11
Ajax	2014–15	Eredivisie	30	6	3	0	—		10 (Note: Six appearances and two goals in UEFA Champions League, four appearances in UEFA Europa League)	2	1	0	44	8
Ajax	2015–16	Eredivisie	31	13	0	0	—		10 (Note: Two appearances and two goals in UEFA Champions League, eight appearances in UEFA Europa League)	2	0	0	41	15
Ajax	2016–17	Eredivisie	33	14	0	0	—		17 (Note: Four appearances and four goals in UEFA Champions League, thirteen appearances and two goals in UEFA Europa League)	6	0	0	50	20
Ajax	Total		126	44	8	0	—		45	11	2	0	181	55
Jong Ajax	2013–14	Eerste Divisie	6	1	—		—		—		—		6	1
Everton	2017–18	Premier League	7	0	0	0	1	0	8 (Note: Appearances in UEFA Europa League)	0	—		16	0
Werder Bremen	2018–19	Bundesliga	33	5	5	2	—		—		—		38	7
Werder Bremen	2019–20	Bundesliga	33	7	4	2	—		—		2 (Note: Appearances in Bundesliga relegation play-offs)	0	39	9
Werder Bremen	2020–21	Bundesliga	3	0	1	0	—		—		—		4	0
Werder Bremen	Total		69	12	10	4	—		—		2	0	81	16
Ajax	2020–21	Eredivisie	29	12	5	1	—		12 (Note: Six appearances in UEFA Champions League, six appearances and three goals in UEFA Europa League)	3	—		46	16
Ajax	2021–22	Eredivisie	31	9	5	1	—		7 (Note: Appearances in UEFA Champions League)	1	1	0	44	11
Ajax	2022–23	Eredivisie	33	8	5	1	—		7 (Note: Five appearances and one goal in UEFA Champions League, two appearances in UEFA Europa League)	1	1	0	46	10
Ajax	2023–24	Eredivisie	2	1	—		—		2	0	—		4	1
Ajax	Total		95	30	15	3	—		28	5	2	0	140	38
Inter Milan	2023–24	Serie A	13	0	1	0	—		4	0	0	0	18	0
Ajax	2024–25	Eredivisie	31	8	1	0	—		3	0	—		35	8
Ajax	2025–26	Eredivisie	31	8	2	0	—		8	0	2 (Note: Appearances in Eredivisie European play-offs)	2	41	8
Ajax	2026–27	Eredivisie	10	3	0	0	—		7 (Note: Appearances in UEFA Conference League)	5	—		17	8
Ajax	Total		72	16	3	0	—		18	5	2	2	89	21
Career total			386	103	37	7	1	0	103	21	8	2	534	133

=== International ===
Appearances and goals by national team and year
National team	Year	Apps	Goals
Netherlands	2014	1	0
Netherlands	2015	3	1
Netherlands	2016	7	2
Netherlands	2017	5	1
Netherlands	2020	3	0
Netherlands	2021	12	4
Netherlands	2022	8	2
Netherlands	2023	2	0
Total		41	10

Scores and results list the Netherlands' goal tally first, score column indicates score after each Klaassen goal.

List of international goals scored by Davy Klaassen
No.	Date	Venue	Opponent	Score	Result	Competition
1	31 March 2015	Amsterdam Arena, Amsterdam, Netherlands	Spain	2–0	2–0	Friendly
2	7 October 2016	De Kuip, Rotterdam, Netherlands	Belarus	3–1	4–1	2018 FIFA World Cup qualification
3	9 November 2016	Amsterdam Arena, Amsterdam, Netherlands	Belgium	1–0	1–1	Friendly
4	4 June 2017	De Kuip, Rotterdam, Netherlands	Ivory Coast	4–0	5–0	Friendly
5	24 March 2021	Atatürk Olympic Stadium, Istanbul, Turkey	Turkey	1–3	2–4	2022 FIFA World Cup qualification
6	1 September 2021	Ullevaal Stadion, Oslo, Norway	Norway	1–1	1–1	2022 FIFA World Cup qualification
7	7 September 2021	Johan Cruyff Arena, Amsterdam, Netherlands	Turkey	1–0	6–1	2022 FIFA World Cup qualification
8	8 October 2021	Daugava Stadium, Riga, Latvia	Latvia	1–0	1–0	2022 FIFA World Cup qualification
9	11 June 2022	De Kuip, Rotterdam, Netherlands	Poland	1–2	2–2	2022–23 UEFA Nations League A
10	21 November 2022	Al Thumama Stadium, Doha, Qatar	Senegal	2–0	2–0	2022 FIFA World Cup

== Honours ==
Ajax

- Eredivisie: 2011–12, 2012–13, 2013–14, 2020–21, 2021–22
- KNVB Cup: 2020–21; runner-up: 2013-14, 2021–22, 2022–23
- Johan Cruyff Shield: 2013
- UEFA Europa League runner-up: 2016–17

Inter Milan

- Serie A: 2023–24
- Supercoppa Italiana: 2023

Individual

- AEGON Future Cup Best player: 2010
- Ajax Talent of the Future (Sjaak Swart Award): 2010–11
- Hilversum Sportsman of the Year: 2013
- Ajax Talent of the Year (Marco van Basten Award): 2013–14
- Johan Cruyff Award: 2014
- AFC Ajax Club of 100: 2015
- Dutch Footballer of the Year: 2016
- Eredivisie Player of the Month: November 2020, April 2022
