= Nathan Leyder =

Belgian footballer

Personal information
- Full name: Nathan Leyder
- Date of birth: 14 April 1997 (age 29)
- Place of birth: Namur, Belgium
- Height: 1.80 m (5 ft 11 in)
- Position: Defender

Team information
- Current team: White Star Lauwe

Youth career
- 2001–2002: R. Haut-Fays Sport
- 2002–2006: Excelsior Moeskroen
- 2006–2008: KV Kortrijk
- 2008–2010: Excelsior Moeskroen
- 2010–2013: Club Brugge
- 2013: Zulte Waregem
- 2013–2017: AFC Ajax

Senior career*
| Years | Team | Apps | (Gls) |
| 2017 | Jong Ajax | 1 | (0) |
| 2017–2018 | VW Hamme | 8 | (0) |
| 2018–2019 | RE Acren-Lessines | | |
| 2019– | White Star Lauwe | | |

International career
| 2013–2014 | Belgium U17 | 5 | (0) |
- * Club domestic league appearances and goals as of 22 January 2018

Nathan Leyder (born 14 April 1997) is a Belgian footballer who plays as defender for White Star Lauwe.
