= List of Dutch football transfers winter 2013–14 =

This is a list of transfers in Dutch football for the 2013-14 Winter transfer window. Only moves featuring an Eredivisie side are listed.

The summer transfer window will open on January 1, 2014, and will close on January 31. Deals may be signed at any given moment in the season, but the actual transfer may only take place during the transfer window. Unattached players may sign at any moment.

Date	Name	Moving from	Moving to	Fee
2 January 2014	(Burkina Faso) Bertrand Traoré	(England) Chelsea FC	(Netherlands) Vitesse Arnhem	Loan
2 January 2014	(England) Sam Hutchinson	(Netherlands) Vitesse Arnhem	(England) Chelsea FC	End of Loan
2 January 2014	(France) Gaël Kakuta	(Netherlands) Vitesse Arnhem	(England) Chelsea FC	End of Loan
3 January 2014	(Netherlands) Youri Loen	(Netherlands) NEC	(Netherlands) FC Dordrecht	Loan
3 January 2014	(Ivory Coast) Sekou Cissé	(Netherlands) Feyenoord	(Belgium) Genk	Free
3 January 2014	(Netherlands) Adnane Tighadouini	(Netherlands) Vitesse Arnhem	(Netherlands) NAC Breda	Undisclosed
3 January 2014	(Netherlands) Alex Schalk	(Netherlands) NAC Breda	(Netherlands) PSV	Loan
3 January 2014	(Hungary) Szabolcs Varga	(Hungary) MTK Budapest	(Netherlands) sc Heerenveen	Undisclosed
6 January 2014	(Serbia) Uroš Đurđević	(Serbia) FK Rad	(Netherlands) Vitesse Arnhem	Undisclosed
7 January 2014	(Netherlands) Michel Breuer	(Netherlands) NEC Nijmegen	(Netherlands) Sparta Rotterdam	Loan
8 January 2014	(Norway) Magnus Wolff Eikrem	(Netherlands) SC Heerenveen	(Wales) Cardiff City	Undisclosed
9 January 2014	(Morocco) Zakaria Labyad	Sporting Clube de Portugal	(Netherlands) Vitesse Arnhem	Loan
9 January 2014	(Netherlands) Elvis Manu	(Netherlands) Feyenoord	(Netherlands) Cambuur Leeuwarden	Loan
11 January 2014	(Cameroon) Eyong Enoh	(Netherlands) Ajax	(Turkey) Antalyaspor	€600.000
12 January 2014	(Costa Rica) Bryan Ruiz	(England) Fulham FC	(Netherlands) PSV	Loan
13 January 2014	(Sweden) Emil Johansson	(Netherlands) FC Groningen	(Norway) Sandnes Ulf	Undisclosed
13 January 2014	(Belgium) Maarten Martens	(Netherlands) AZ Alkmaar	(Greece) PAOK FC	Undisclosed
15 January 2014	(Netherlands) Rochdi Achenteh	(Netherlands) PEC Zwolle	(Netherlands) Vitesse Arnhem	Undisclosed
16 January 2014	(Netherlands) Berry Powel	Unattached	(Netherlands) Heracles Almelo	Free agent
16 January 2014	(Netherlands) Jordy van Deelen	(Netherlands) Feyenoord	(Netherlands) FC Dordrecht	Loan
17 January 2014	(Netherlands) Geoffrey Castillion	(Netherlands) Ajax	(Netherlands) NEC Nijmegen	Loan
17 January 2014	(Netherlands) Danzell Gravenberch	(Netherlands) Ajax	(Netherlands) NEC Nijmegen	Loan
17 January 2014	(Bulgaria) Stanislav Manolev	(Netherlands) PSV	Unattached	Free agent
20 January 2014	(Sweden) Ola Toivonen	(Netherlands) PSV	(France) Stade Rennes	€2,500,000
20 January 2014	(United States) Juan Agudelo	(England) Stoke City	(Netherlands) FC Utrecht	Loan
21 January 2014	(Netherlands) Joeri Schroyen	(Netherlands) Go Ahead Eagles	(Netherlands) VVV-Venlo	Loan
21 January 2014	(Netherlands) Daniël de Ridder	Unattached	(Netherlands) RKC Waalwijk	Free Agent
21 January 2014	(Netherlands) Felitciano Zschusschen	(Netherlands) FC Twente	(Netherlands) FC Dordrecht	Loan
21 January 2014	(Nigeria) Bartholomew Ogbeche	Unattached	(Netherlands) Cambuur Leeuwarden	Free Agent
21 January 2014	(Philippines) Paul Mulders	Unattached	(Netherlands) Cambuur Leeuwarden	Free Agent
23 January 2014	(Netherlands) Jurjan Wouda	(Netherlands) FC Emmen	(Netherlands) RKC Waalwijk	Undisclosed
26 January 2014	(Netherlands) Oebele Schokker	(Netherlands) Cambuur Leeuwarden	(Netherlands) FC Emmen	Loan
27 January 2014	(Netherlands) Anthony Lurling	(Netherlands) NAC Breda	(Netherlands) SC Heerenveen	Undisclosed
27 January 2014	(Netherlands) Brahim Darri	(Netherlands) Vitesse Arnhem	(Netherlands) De Graafschap	Loan
