= Jasper Heusinkveld =

Dutch footballer

Personal information
- Date of birth: 24 December 1988 (age 37)
- Place of birth: Doetinchem, Netherlands
- Height: 1.85 m (6 ft 1 in)
- Position: Goalkeeper

Youth career
- SC Varsseveld
- De Graafschap

Senior career*
Years	Team	Apps	(Gls)
2009–2013	Go Ahead Eagles	4	(0)
2013–2017	De Graafschap	21	(0)
2017–2018	DFS		
- * Club domestic league appearances and goals as of 21 May 2017

Jasper Heusinkveld (born 24 December 1988) is a Dutch retired footballer who played as a goalkeeper.

Raised in Varsseveld, he has played for Go Ahead Eagles and De Graafschap in the Dutch Eerste Divisie and later for Hoofdklasse side SV DFS, whom he left in 2018.
