= Henk Dijkhuizen =

Dutch footballer (born 1992)

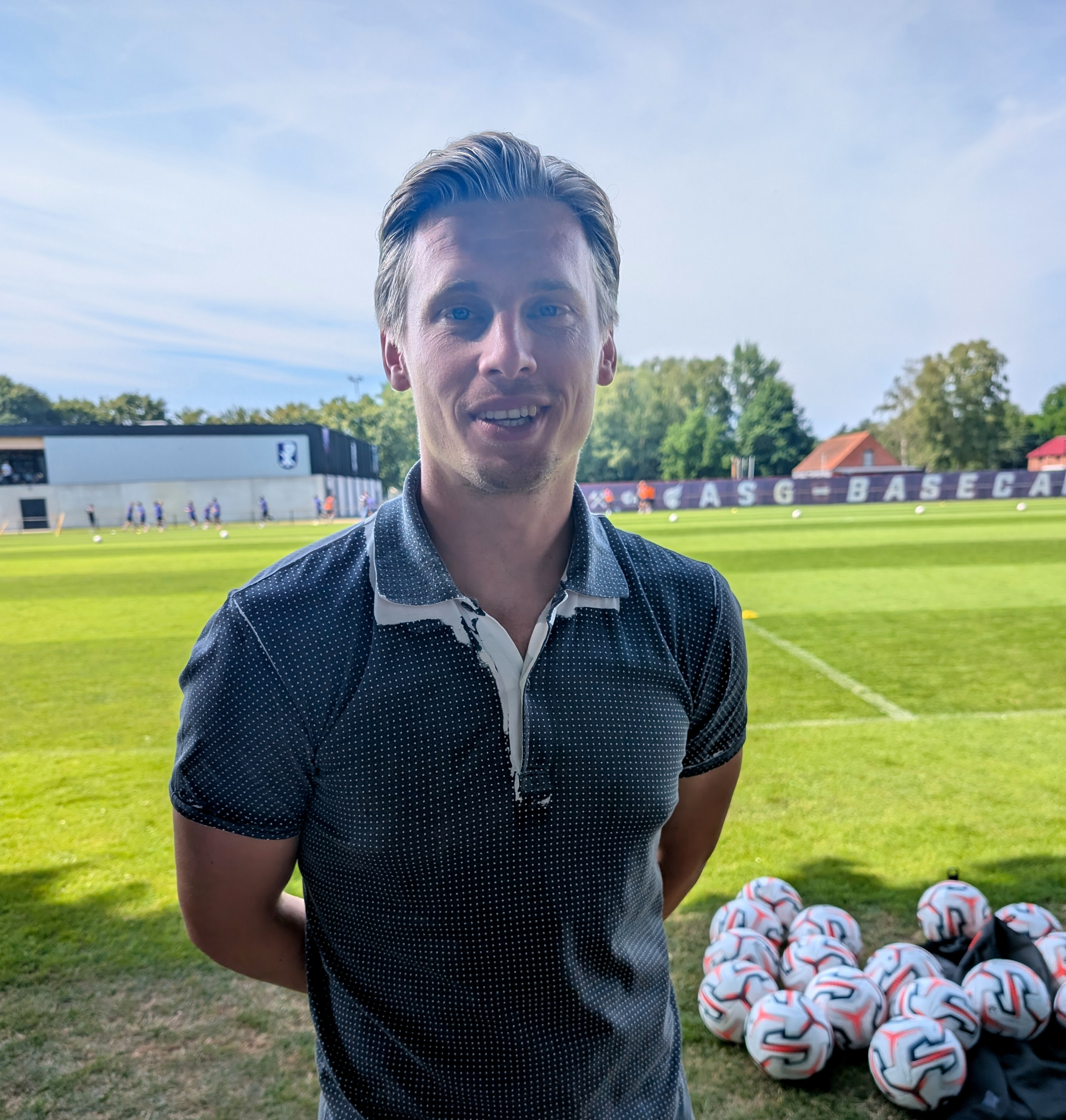

Personal information
- Date of birth: 9 June 1992 (age 34)
- Place of birth: The Hague, Netherlands
- Height: 1.75 m (5 ft 9 in)
- Position: Right-back

Team information
- Current team: Patro Eisden (assistant coach)

Youth career
- SVV Scheveningen
- Feyenoord
- Sparta

Senior career*
Years	Team	Apps	(Gls)
2010–2013	Sparta	46	(0)
2013–2019	Roda JC	122	(9)
2020	TOP Oss	8	(0)
2020–2025	Patro Eisden	104	(1)

International career
2013	Netherlands U21	2	(0)

Managerial career
- 2025–: Patro Eisden (assistant)
- * Club domestic league appearances and goals

Henk Dijkhuizen (born 9 June 1992) is a Dutch professional football coach and a former right-back who is an assistant coach for Belgian Challenger Pro League club Patro Eisden.

== Club career ==
Hailing from seaside resort Scheveningen, Dijkhuizen joined Eredivisie side Roda JC from second-tier Sparta in summer 2013. Despite being out for the whole 2016–17 season with a knee injury, the Kerkrade club extended his contract with another two years.

On 4 January 2020, Dijkhuizen joined TOP Oss on a contract for the rest of the season. In September 2020, he signed with Belgian club Patro Eisden.

== International career ==
Dijkhuizen received his first call-up for the Netherlands national under-21 football team in 2013.
