= Bart van Muyen =

Dutch footballer

Personal information
- Full name: Bart van Muyen
- Date of birth: 19 December 1982 (age 43)
- Place of birth: Rotterdam, Netherlands
- Height: 1.88 m (6 ft 2 in)
- Position: Defender

Youth career
- VV Zwijndrecht
- Sparta Rotterdam
- FC Dordrecht

Senior career*
Years	Team	Apps	(Gls)
2003–2011	FC Dordrecht	233	(9)
2011–2013	FC Oss	33	(2)
2013–2014	ASWH		
2014–2017	VV Spijkenisse		
2017–2019	ZVV Pelikaan		
- * Club domestic league appearances and goals as of 26 November 2022

Bart van Muyen (born 19 December 1982 in Rotterdam) is a former Dutch professional footballer who played during his career as a defender for FC Dordrecht and FC Oss in the Dutch Eerste Divisie.
