= Ard van Peppen =

Dutch footballer

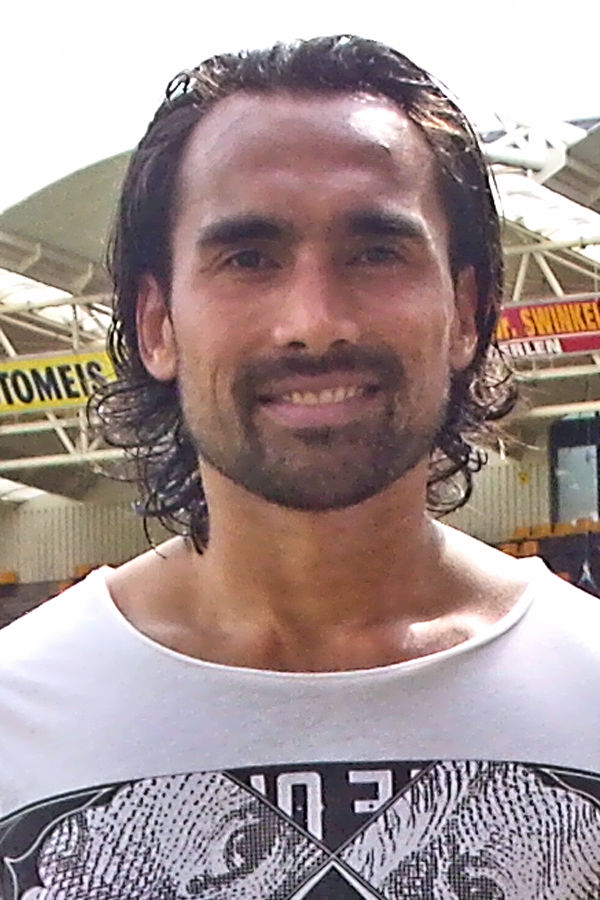

Personal information
- Full name: Ard van Peppen
- Date of birth: 26 June 1985 (age 41)
- Place of birth: Delft, Netherlands
- Height: 1.82 m (5 ft 11 1/2 in)
- Position: Left back

Youth career
- VV Longa 33
- Vitesse Delft
- Sparta Rotterdam
- Almere City

Senior career*
Years	Team	Apps	(Gls)
2004–2006	Jong Feyenoord	0	(0)
2005–2006	→ Excelsior (loan)	19	(0)
2006–2008	De Graafschap	39	(2)
2008	→ Excelsior (loan)	8	(0)
2008–2010	Excelsior	72	(1)
2010–2013	RKC Waalwijk	94	(5)
2013–2018	Roda JC	137	(2)
Total		369	(10)
- * Club domestic league appearances and goals

Ard van Peppen (born 26 June 1985) is a Dutch former professional footballer who played as a left back.

As a player he has won promotion from Eerste Divisie to the Eredivisie on three occasions.

He is Indonesian descent from his mother.

== Career ==
Born in Delft, Van Peppen started his professional career for Feyenoord, but was soon loaned out to feeder club SBV Excelsior. During his loan spell he gained promotion to the Eredivisie with Excelsior during the 2005/6 after winning the Dutch second division.

In 2006, he signed with De Graafschap. He made his debut for the club in a 0-1 lost home match against Go Ahead Eagles and again gained promotion to the Eredivisie after winning the Dutch second division during the 2006/7 season. He played for De Graafschap in the Eredivisie after promotion during 2007.

He returned on loan to Excelsior in 2008 before joining Excelsior on a permanent deal after his loan spell. Excelsior qualified for the promotion playoffs during the 2008/09 season however were knocked out by RKC Waalwijk, however he again gained promotion from the Eerste Divisie for the 3rd time, when Excelsior beat Sparta Rotterdam in the Playoff final during the 2010/11 season.

In 2010, he was transferred to RKC Waalwijk, who were just relegated to the Dutch second division.

After three years Van Peppen left RKC Waalwijk on a free transfer and he signed a three-year contract with Eredivisie side Roda JC Kerkrade. When his contract was not extended there, he was a free agent again. In April 2019, Van Peppen announced that he had officially retired.

== Honours ==
Excelsior

- Eerste Divisie: 2005–06
- Eerste Divisie playoffs: 2010–11

De Graafschap

- Eerste Divisie: 2006–07

RKC Waalwijk:

- Eerste Divisie: 2010–11
