= 2021 KNVB Cup final =

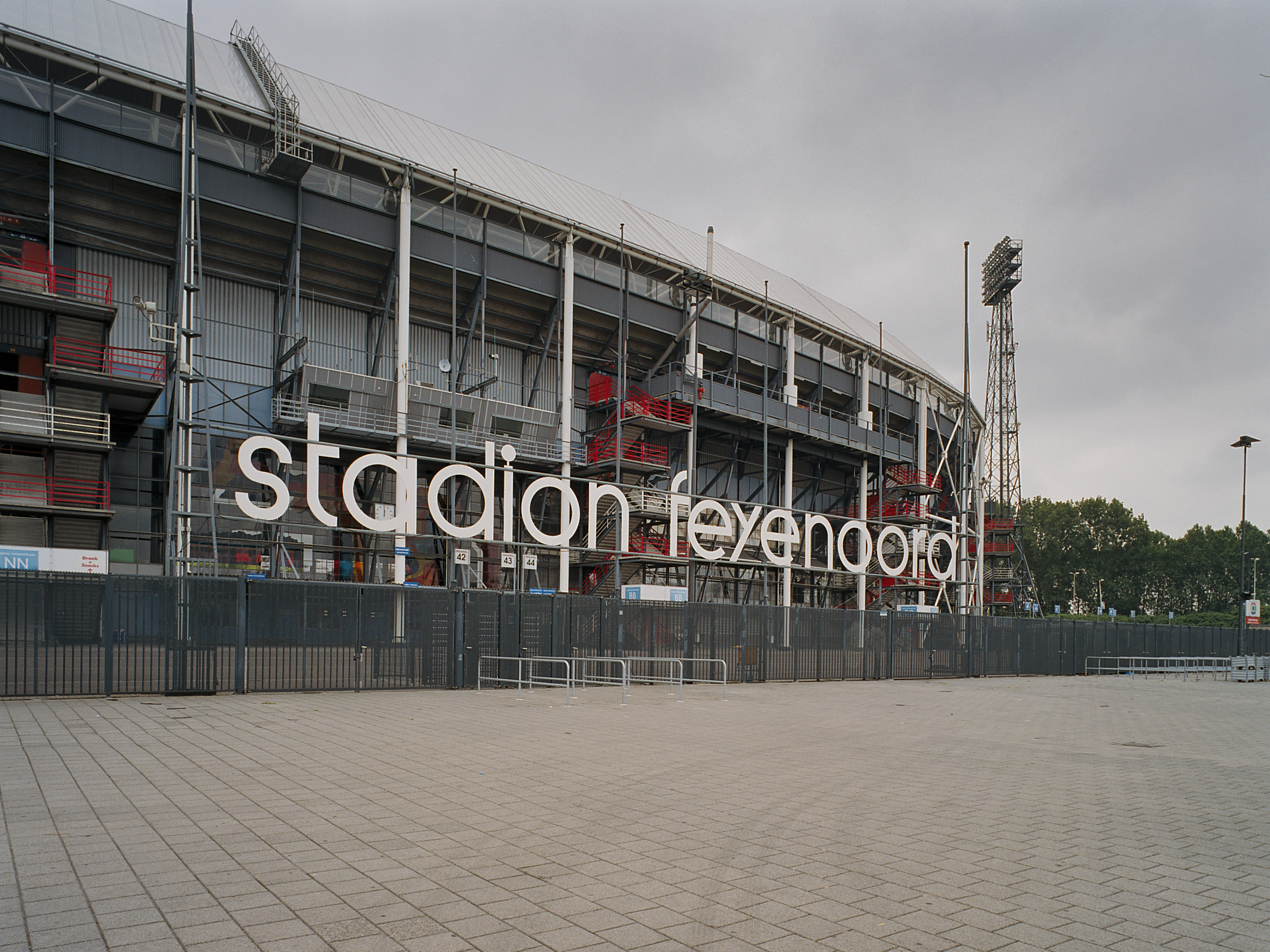
- De Kuip in Rotterdam hosted the final.
- Event: 2020–21 KNVB Cup
Ajax	Vitesse
2	1
- Date: 18 April 2021
- Venue: De Kuip, Rotterdam
- Referee: Björn Kuipers
- Attendance: 0 (Note: The match was played behind closed doors due to the COVID-19 pandemic in the Netherlands.)

The 2021 KNVB Cup final was a football match between Eredivisie clubs Ajax and Vitesse, that took place on 18 April 2021 at De Kuip, Rotterdam. It was the final match of the 2020–21 KNVB Cup, the 103rd season of the annual Dutch national football cup competition.

Ajax won the match 2–1 for a record twentieth title. As winners, they will compete in the 2021 Johan Cruyff Shield and earned a spot in the 2021–22 UEFA Europa League play-off round if they do not qualify for the 2021–22 UEFA Champions League.

It was announced in March 2021 that there would be no fans at the match due to the COVID-19 pandemic.

== Route to the final ==
Ajax		Round	Vitesse	
Opponent	Result		Opponent	Result
Bye		First round	Bye	
FC Utrecht	5–4 (H)	Second round	Willem II	2–0 (A)
AZ	1–0 (A)	Round of 16	ADO Den Haag	2–1 (H)
PSV Eindhoven	2–1 (H)	Quarter-finals	SBV Excelsior	1–0 (A)
SC Heerenveen	3–0 (A)	Semi-finals	VVV-Venlo	2–0 (H)

== Match ==
18 April 2021
18:00 UTC+02:00

Ajax	2–1	Vitesse
Gravenberch 23'; Neres 90+1'	Report	Openda 30'

De Kuip, Rotterdam
Attendance: 0
Referee: Björn Kuipers

Ajax	Vitesse

GK	1	(Netherlands) Maarten Stekelenburg
RB	15	(Netherlands) Devyne Rensch		(substituted off) 75'
CB	2	(Netherlands) Jurriën Timber
CB	21	(Argentina) Lisandro Martínez
LB	31	(Argentina) Nicolás Tagliafico	(yellow card) 90+5'
CM	4	(Mexico) Edson Álvarez
CM	6	(Netherlands) Davy Klaassen		(substituted off) 87'
CM	8	(Netherlands) Ryan Gravenberch
RF	39	(Brazil) Antony		(substituted off) 87'
CF	22	(Ivory Coast) Sébastien Haller
LF	10	(Serbia) Dušan Tadić (c)
Substitutes:
GK	16	(Netherlands) Kjell Scherpen
GK	33	(Croatia) Dominik Kotarski
DF	3	(Netherlands) Perr Schuurs		(substituted on) 75'
DF	5	(Netherlands) Sean Klaiber
DF	12	(Morocco) Noussair Mazraoui
MF	18	(Netherlands) Jurgen Ekkelenkamp		(substituted on) 87'
MF	19	(Morocco) Zakaria Labyad
MF	20	(Ghana) Mohammed Kudus
FW	7	(Brazil) David Neres		(substituted on) 87'
FW	9	(Morocco) Oussama Idrissi
FW	23	(Burkina Faso) Lassina Traoré
FW	30	(Netherlands) Brian Brobbey
Manager:
(Netherlands) Erik ten Hag

GK	22	(Netherlands) Remko Pasveer (c)
CB	3	(Netherlands) Danilho Doekhi
CB	10	(Netherlands) Riechedly Bazoer
CB	6	(Denmark) Jacob Rasmussen	(red card) 86'
RWB	2	(Israel) Eli Dasa		(substituted off) 46'
LWB	32	(Germany) Maximilian Wittek	(yellow card) 74'	(substituted off) 89'
RM	8	(Norway) Sondre Tronstad
CM	14	(Morocco) Oussama Tannane	(yellow card) 63'	(substituted off) 89'
LM	21	(Slovakia) Matúš Bero	(yellow card) 90+3'
CF	7	(Belgium) Loïs Openda		(substituted off) 65'
CF	11	(Albania) Armando Broja
Substitutes:
GK	23	(Netherlands) Bilal Bayazit
GK	24	(Netherlands) Jeroen Houwen
DF	16	(Croatia) Alois Oroz		(substituted on) 46'
DF	18	(Czech Republic) Tomáš Hájek		(substituted on) 89'
DF	39	(Netherlands) Enzo Cornelisse
DF	42	(Netherlands) Million Manhoef
MF	20	(Netherlands) Thomas Bruns
MF	27	(Germany) Idrissa Touré	(yellow card) 72'	(substituted on) 65'
MF	40	(Netherlands) Daan Huisman
FW	9	(Algeria) Oussama Darfalou		(substituted on) 89'
FW	17	(Nigeria) Hilary Gong
FW	19	(England) Noah Ohio
Manager:
(Germany) Thomas Letsch

Assistant referees:
Sander van Roekel
Erwin Zeinstra
Fourth official:
Allard Lindhout
Video assistant referee:
Pol van Boekel
Assistant video assistant referee:
Joost van Zuilen

Match rules

- 90 minutes.
- 30 minutes of extra time if necessary.
- Penalty shoot-out if scores still level.
- Maximum of twelve named substitutes.
- Maximum of five substitutions, with a sixth allowed in extra time. (Note: Each team was only given three opportunities to make substitutions, with a fourth opportunity in extra time, excluding substitutions made at half-time, before the start of extra time and at half-time in extra time.)
