= 2020–21 SBV Vitesse season =

SBV Vitesse
2020–21 season
- Owner: Valeriy Oyf
- Chairman: Yevgeny Merkel
- Head coach: Thomas Letsch
- Stadium: GelreDome
- Eredivisie: 4th
- KNVB Cup: Runners-up
- Top goalscorer: League: Armando Broja; Loïs Openda (10 each); All: Loïs Openda (13 goals)
Home colours	Away colours	Third colours
- All statistics correct as of 16 May 2021.

The 2020–21 season was the 128th season in existence of SBV Vitesse and the club's 31st consecutive season in the top flight of Dutch football. In addition to the domestic league, Vitesse participated in this season's edition of the KNVB Cup. The season covered the period from 1 July 2020 to 30 June 2021.

== Players ==
=== First-team squad ===
As of 1 February 2021

Note: Flags indicate national team as defined under FIFA eligibility rules; some limited exceptions apply. Players may hold more than one non-FIFA nationality.

No.	Pos.	Nation	Player
2	DF	ISR	Eli Dasa
3	DF	NED	Danilho Doekhi
6	DF	DEN	Jacob Rasmussen (on loan from Fiorentina)
7	FW	BEL	Loïs Openda (on loan from Club Brugge)
8	MF	NOR	Sondre Tronstad
9	FW	ALG	Oussama Darfalou
10	MF	NED	Riechedly Bazoer
11	FW	ALB	Armando Broja (on loan from Chelsea)
14	MF	MAR	Oussama Tannane
16	DF	CRO	Alois Oroz
17	FW	NGR	Hilary Gong
18	DF	CZE	Tomáš Hájek
19	FW	NED	Noah Ohio (on loan from RB Leipzig)
20	MF	NED	Thomas Bruns

No.	Pos.	Nation	Player
21	MF	SVK	Matúš Bero
22	GK	NED	Remko Pasveer (captain)
23	GK	NED	Bilal Bayazit
24	GK	NED	Jeroen Houwen
27	MF	GER	Idrissa Touré (on loan from Juventus)
32	DF	GER	Maximilian Wittek
36	MF	NED	Patrick Vroegh
39	DF	NED	Enzo Cornelisse
40	MF	NED	Daan Huisman
41	DF	NED	Brend Leeflang
42	DF	NED	Million Manhoef
43	FW	NED	Roy Kuijpers
44	FW	NED	Enrico Hernández

=== Players out on loan ===
Note: Flags indicate national team as defined under FIFA eligibility rules; some limited exceptions apply. Players may hold more than one non-FIFA nationality.

No. / Pos. / Nation / Player; — / FW / NED / Thomas Buitink (on loan to PEC Zwolle until 30 June 2021)	No. / Pos. / Nation / Player

== Pre-season and friendlies ==
Win Draw Loss

15 August 2020 Friendly	PSV	1–1	Vitesse	Eindhoven, Netherlands
18:45 CEST (UTC+2)	Dumfries (yellow card) 35'; Gakpo 52'		Doekhi 6'; Bero (yellow card) 56'; Oukili (yellow card) 86'	Stadium: Philips Stadion

22 August 2020 Friendly	ADO Den Haag	2–2	Vitesse	The Hague, Netherlands
20:00 CEST (UTC+2)				Stadium: Cars Jeans Stadion

28 August 2020 Friendly	Vitesse	2–2	Fortuna Düsseldorf	Arnhem, Netherlands
18:00 CEST (UTC+2)	Tannane 31'; Bero 68'	Report	Darfalou 26' (o.g.); Hoffmann 45'	Stadium: GelreDome

14 September 2020 Friendly	FC Utrecht	1–2	Vitesse	Utrecht, Netherlands
14:00 CEST (UTC+2)	De Keijzer (yellow card); Nasser 90'		Manhoef 67'; Broja 78'	Stadium: Sportcomplex Zoudenbalch; Attendance: 0

== Competitions ==
=== Overview ===
Competition	First match	Last match	Starting round	Final position	Record							
Competition	First match	Last match	Starting round	Final position	Pld	W	D	L	GF	GA	GD	Win %
Eredivisie	13 September 2020	16 May 2021	Matchday 1	4th	34	18	7	9	52	38	+14	52.94
KNVB Cup	2 December 2020	18 April 2021	First round	Runners-up	5	4	0	1	8	3	+5	80.00
Total					39	22	7	10	60	41	+19	56.41

Last updated: 16 May 2021
Source: Soccerway

=== Eredivisie ===
==== League table ====
Pos	Team	Pld	W	D	L	GF	GA	GD	Pts	Qualification or relegation
2	PSV Eindhoven	34	21	9	4	74	35	+39	72	Qualification for the Champions League second qualifying round
3	AZ	34	21	8	5	75	41	+34	71	Qualification for the Europa League play-off round
4	Vitesse	34	18	7	9	52	38	+14	61	Qualification for the Europa Conference League third qualifying round
5	Feyenoord (O)	34	16	11	7	64	36	+28	59	Qualification for the European competition play-offs (Note: Winner of play-off will qualify to Europa Conference League second qualifying round.)
6	Utrecht	34	13	14	7	52	41	+11	53	Qualification for the European competition play-offs

Source: Eredivisie, Soccerway
Rules for classification: Season in progress: 1) Most points won; 2) Less points lost; 3) Goal difference; 4) Goals scored; 5) Alphabetical order; End of season: 1) Points; 2) Goal difference; 3) Goals scored; 4) Head-to-head points; 5) Head-to-head goal difference; 6) Head-to-head away goals scored; 7) Play-off if relevant for deciding champion, relegation or participating in a European league, otherwise by draw. 8) Penalty shoot-out (only after a play-off)
(O) Play-off winners

==== Results summary ====
Overall								Home						Away					
Pld	W	D	L	GF	GA	GD	Pts	W	D	L	GF	GA	GD	W	D	L	GF	GA	GD
34	18	7	9	52	38	+14	61	11	4	2	26	12	+14	7	3	7	26	26	0

Last updated: 16 May 2021.
Source: Eredivisie

==== Results by round ====
Round	1	2	3	4	5	6	7	8	9	10	11	12	13	14	15	16	17	18	19	20	21	22	23	24	25	26	27	28	29	30	31	32	33	34
Ground	A	H	A	H	A	H	A	H	A	H	A	H	H	A	A	H	A	H	A	H	A	H	A	H	H	A	H	A	H	A	H	A	A	H
Result	W	W	L	W	W	W	W	W	D	W	L	D	W	L	W	W	W	W	L	D	L	L	L	W	W	W	D	W	D	D	W	L	D	L
Position	8	4	6	4	3	2	2	2	2	2	2	4	3	4	3	3	2	2	3	3	3	4	5	4	4	4	4	4	4	4	4	4	4	4

Updated to match(es) played on 16 May 2021. Source: Eredivisie
A = Away; H = Home; W = Win; D = Draw; L = Loss

==== Matches ====
The league fixtures were announced on 24 July 2020.

13 September 2020 1	RKC Waalwijk	0–1	Vitesse	Waalwijk
16:45 CEST (UTC+2)	Sow (yellow card) 87'	Report	Darfalou 45+2'; Buitink (yellow card) 89'	Stadium: Mandemakers Stadion; Attendance: 1,967; Referee: Edwin van de Graaf

19 September 2020 2	Vitesse	2–0	Sparta Rotterdam	Arnhem
18:45 CEST (UTC+2)	Tannane 27'; Darfalou (yellow card) 44'; Hájek (yellow card) 53'; Broja 82'	Report	Harroui (yellow card) 6'; Heylen (yellow card) 20' (yellow-red card) 42'; Pinto (yellow card) 54'	Stadium: GelreDome; Attendance: 4,914; Referee: Björn Kuipers

26 September 2020 3	Ajax	2–1	Vitesse	Amsterdam
21:00 CEST (UTC+2)	Schuurs (yellow card) 10'; Promes 21'; Álvarez (red card) 44'; Blind (yellow card) 45+1'; Antony 70'; Tagliafico (yellow card) 89'	Report	Bruns (yellow card) 35'; Hájek (yellow card) 45+3'; Bazoer 56'; Wittek (yellow card) 81'; Tannane (yellow card) 82'	Stadium: Johan Cruyff Arena; Attendance: 12,176; Referee: Pol van Boekel

3 October 2020 4	Vitesse	3–0	Heracles Almelo	Arnhem
16:30 CEST (UTC+2)	Openda 34'; Darfalou 37'; Tannane 63'	Report		Stadium: GelreDome; Attendance: 0 Referee: Martin van den Kerkhof

18 October 2020 5	ADO Den Haag	0–2	Vitesse	The Hague
14:30 CEST (UTC+2)		Report	Broja 32', 71'; Tannane (red card) 45'	Stadium: Cars Jeans Stadion; Attendance: 0 Referee: Richard Martens

25 October 2020 6	Vitesse	2–1	PSV	Arnhem
14:30 CET (UTC+1)	Rasmussen 9'; Openda 54'; Tronstad (yellow card) 64'; Buitink (yellow card) 80'; Dasa (yellow card) 84'	Report	Boscagli 50'	Stadium: GelreDome; Attendance: 0 Referee: Bas Nijhuis

31 October 2020 7	Willem II	1–3	Vitesse	Tilburg
21:00 CET (UTC+1)	Nunnely 25'	Report	Openda 57'; Broja 63'; Vroegh 85'	Stadium: Koning Willem II Stadion; Attendance: 0 Referee: Marc Nagtegaal

8 November 2020 8	Vitesse	3–1	FC Emmen	Arnhem
14:30 CET (UTC+1)	Tannane 9', 26'; Bazoer (red card) 29'; Openda 44'	Report	Wiedwald (yellow card) 8'; Tibbling (yellow card) 20'; Veendorp (yellow card) 43'; de Leeuw 58'; Carty (yellow card) 79'; van Rhijn (yellow card) 88'	Stadium: GelreDome; Attendance: 0 Referee: Jeroen Manschot

21 November 2020 9	FC Groningen	1–1	Vitesse	Groningen
20:00 CET (UTC+1)	Joosten 29'; Van Hintum (yellow card) 54'; Dammers (yellow card) 55'	Report	Bero (yellow card) 33'; Openda 45'	Stadium: Hitachi Capital Mobility Stadion; Attendance: 0 Referee: Björn Kuipers

29 November 2020 10	Vitesse	2–0	Fortuna Sittard	Arnhem
12:15 CET (UTC+1)	Darfalou 72'; Broja 83'	Report	Janssen (yellow card) 67'; Jach (yellow card) 82'; Rienstra (yellow card) 90+2'	Stadium: GelreDome; Attendance: 0 Referee: Jochem Kamphuis

5 December 2020 11	PEC Zwolle	2–1	Vitesse	Zwolle
21:00 CET (UTC+1)	Drost 65', (yellow card) 77'; Van Duinen 76' (pen.); Reijnders (yellow card) 90'	Report	Darfalou 7'; Touré (red card) 65'; Bero (yellow card) 74'; Bazoer (yellow card) 90+3'	Stadium: MAC³PARK Stadion; Attendance: 0 Referee: Dennis Higler

13 December 2020 12	Vitesse	1–1	SC Heerenveen	Arnhem
12:15 CET (UTC+1)	Darfalou 39'; Wittek (yellow card) 68'; Bazoer (yellow card) 87'	Report	Floranus 54', (yellow card) 90+1'; Woudenberg (yellow card) 58'	Stadium: GelreDome; Attendance: 0 Referee: Allard Lindhout

20 December 2020 13	Vitesse	1–0	Feyenoord	Arnhem
12:15 CET (UTC+1)	Darfalou 40', (yellow card) 53'; Tannane (yellow card) 32'; Rasmussen (yellow card) 73'; Touré (yellow card) 86'	Report	Nieuwkoop (yellow card) 58'	Stadium: GelreDome; Attendance: 0 Referee: Pol van Boekel

23 December 2020 14	AZ Alkmaar	3–1	Vitesse	Alkmaar
16:30 CET (UTC+1)	Karlsson 5'; Boadu 40'; Druijf 75'	Report	Openda 46'	Stadium: AFAS Stadion; Attendance: 0 Referee: Bas Nijhuis

9 January 2021 15	Heracles Almelo	0–2	Vitesse	Almelo
20:00 CET (UTC+1)		Report	Bero 38', 83'	Stadium: Erve Asito; Attendance: 0 Referee: Danny Makkelie

12 January 2021 16	Vitesse	1–0	FC Utrecht	Arnhem
18:45 CET (UTC+1)	Doekhi 26'; Bruns (yellow card) 83'	Report	Van der Maarel (yellow card) 15'	Stadium: GelreDome; Attendance: 0 Referee: Edwin van de Graaf

16 January 2021 17	FC Emmen	1–4	Vitesse	Emmen
16:30 CET (UTC+1)	De Leeuw 58'; Veendorp (yellow card) 79'; Bakker (yellow card) 85'; Vlak (yellow card) 87'	Report	Buitink 2'; Tannane 9'; Broja 49'; Bazoer (yellow card) 57'; Bruns (yellow card) 64'; Wittek (yellow card) 72'; Vroegh 90+3'	Stadium: De Oude Meerdijk; Attendance: 0 Referee: Jochem Kamphuis

23 January 2021 18	Vitesse	1–0	FC Groningen	Arnhem
18:45 CET (UTC+1)	Bazoer 36'; Tannane (yellow card) 73'; Vroegh (yellow card) 79'	Report	El Messaoudi (yellow card) 45'; Da Cruz (yellow card) 58'	Stadium: GelreDome; Attendance: 0 Referee: Björn Kuipers

27 January 2021 19	VVV-Venlo	4–1	Vitesse	Venlo
20:00 CET (UTC+1)	Giakoumakis 16', 28', 43', 79'	Report	Broja 60', (yellow card) 62'	Stadium: De Koel; Attendance: 0 Referee: Allard Lindhout

30 January 2021 20	Vitesse	1–1	RKC Waalwijk	Arnhem
21:00 CET (UTC+1)	Bero (yellow card) 59'; Bazoer 71'	Report	Van der Venne (yellow card) 13', (goal) 75'; Anita (yellow card) 33'	Stadium: GelreDome; Attendance: 0 Referee: Richard Martens

6 February 2021 21	SC Heerenveen	1–0	Vitesse	Heerenveen
21:00 CET (UTC+1)	J. Veerman (penalty missed) 30'; H. Veerman 83'	Report	Tronstad (yellow card) 73'	Stadium: Abe Lenstra Stadion; Attendance: 0 Referee: Bas Nijhuis

14 February 2021 22	Vitesse	0–2	FC Twente	Arnhem
16:45 CET (UTC+1)	Tronstad (yellow card) 40'	Report	Menig 16'; Bosch (yellow card) 56'; Van Leeuwen 90+4'	Stadium: GelreDome; Attendance: 0 Referee: Sander van der Eijk

21 February 2021 23	PSV	3–1	Vitesse	Eindhoven
16:45 CET (UTC+1)	Gutiérrez (yellow card) 38'; Malen 66'; Sangaré (yellow card) 74'; Götze 86', 88'	Report	Broja 4'	Stadium: Philips Stadion; Attendance: 0 Referee: Björn Kuipers

27 February 2021 24	Vitesse	4–1	VVV-Venlo	Arnhem
20:00 CET (UTC+1)	Openda 3'; Bazoer 57'; Tronstad 75'; Broja 82'	Report	Giakoumakis 19' (pen.)	Stadium: GelreDome; Attendance: 0 Referee: Erwin Blank

7 March 2021 25	Vitesse	2–1	AZ	Arnhem
16:45 CET (UTC+1)	Bero (yellow card) 12'; Tannane (yellow card) 12'; Openda 31'; Rasmussen 72'; Cornelisse (red card) 79'; Dasa (yellow card) 90+3'	Report	De Wit (yellow card) 19'; Karlsson 81'	Stadium: GelreDome; Attendance: 0 Referee: Pol van Boekel

14 March 2021 26	FC Utrecht	1–3	Vitesse	Utrecht
14:30 CET (UTC+1)	Kerk 41'; Maher (yellow card) 48'; Mahi (yellow card) 51'; Oelschlägel (yellow card) 54'; Janssen (yellow card) 79'	Report	Wittek (yellow card) 17', (goal) 57'; Bazoer (yellow card) 23' (yellow-red card) 82'; Darfalou 44', 54' (pen.); Openda (yellow card) 51'; Huisman (yellow card) 88'; Bruns (yellow card) 90+5'	Stadium: Stadion Galgenwaard; Attendance: 0 Referee: Jochem Kamphuis

21 March 2021 27	Vitesse	0–0	Willem II	Arnhem
14:30 CET (UTC+1)	Rasmussen (yellow card) 20'; Tannane (yellow card) 54'	Report	Spieringhs (yellow card) 24'	Stadium: GelreDome; Attendance: 0 Referee: Danny Makkelie

3 April 2021 28	FC Twente	1–2	Vitesse	Enschede
20:00 CEST (UTC+2)	Đumić (yellow card) 4'; Danilo 20' (pen.); Roemeratoe (yellow card) 88'	Report	Tannane 44' (pen.), 90+5' (pen.); Broja (yellow card) 88'	Stadium: De Grolsch Veste; Attendance: 0 Referee: Pol van Boekel

9 April 2021 29	Vitesse	0–0	ADO Den Haag	Arnhem
20:00 CEST (UTC+2)	Tannane (yellow card) 23'; Tronstad (yellow card) 38'	Report	Besuijen (yellow card) 20'; Vejinović (yellow card) 35'; Philipp (yellow card) 57'; Pinas (yellow card) 60'; Zuiverloon (yellow card) 65'; Kemper (yellow card) 90'	Stadium: GelreDome; Attendance: 0 Referee: Jochem Kamphuis

25 April 2021 30	Feyenoord	0–0	Vitesse	Rotterdam
16:45 CEST (UTC+2)	Toornstra (yellow card) 26'; Berghuis (red card) 75'; Malacia (yellow card) 90+1'	Report	Hájek (yellow card) 3'; Wittek (yellow card) 43'; Bazoer (yellow card) 44'; Tronstad (yellow card) 45+1'	Stadium: De Kuip; Attendance: 6,500; Referee: Dennis Higler

1 May 2021 31	Vitesse	2–1	PEC Zwolle	Arnhem
20:00 CEST (UTC+2)	Broja 27'; Manhoef (yellow card) 42'; Bero (yellow card) 62'; Doekhi (yellow card) 69'; Touré 90+2'	Report	Drost 54'	Stadium: GelreDome; Attendance: 0 Referee: Joey Kooij

7 May 2021 32	Sparta Rotterdam	3–0	Vitesse	Rotterdam
20:00 CEST (UTC+2)	Smeets 36'; Thy 77'; Emegha 80'	Report		Stadium: Het Kasteel; Attendance: 0 Referee: Bas Nijhuis

13 May 2021 33	Fortuna Sittard	3–3	Vitesse	Sittard
14:30 CEST (UTC+2)	Rienstra 1'; Flemming 41', 54'; Rota (yellow card) 67'	Report	Tronstad 25'; Bazoer 30', (yellow card) 64'; Openda 90+4'	Stadium: Fortuna Sittard Stadion; Attendance: 0 Referee: Marc Nagtegaal

16 May 2021 34	Vitesse	1–3	Ajax	Arnhem
14:30 CEST (UTC+2)	Hájek (yellow card) 23'; Openda 44'	Report	Haller 12'; Antony (yellow card) 25', (goal) 43'; Martínez 75'; Neres (yellow card) 84'	Stadium: GelreDome; Attendance: 0 Referee: Serdar Gözübüyük

=== KNVB Cup ===
2 December 2020 First round	HHC Hardenberg	Bye	Vitesse	Hardenberg
19:45 CET (UTC+1)				Stadium: Sportpark De Boshoek

17 December 2020 Second round	Willem II	0–2	Vitesse	Tilburg
21:00 CET (UTC+1)	Holmén (yellow card) 41'; Schippers (yellow card) 84'	Report	Manhoef 20'; Buitink 63'	Stadium: Koning Willem II Stadion; Attendance: 0 Referee: Sander van der Eijk

19 January 2021 Round of 16	Vitesse	2–1	ADO Den Haag	Arnhem
18:45 CET (UTC+1)	Openda 25'; Bero 71'	Report	Castillo (yellow card) 54'; Ćatić 81'	Stadium: GelreDome; Attendance: 0 Referee: Dennis Higler

9 February 2021 Quarter-finals	Excelsior	0–1	Vitesse	Rotterdam
20:00 CET (UTC+1)		Report	Bazoer (yellow card) 20'; Openda 90+1'	Stadium: Van Donge & De Roo Stadion; Attendance: 0 Referee: Dennis Higler

2 March 2021 Semi-finals	Vitesse	2–0	VVV-Venlo	Arnhem
21:00 CET (UTC+1)	Tannane (yellow card) 63', (goal) 84'; Broja 75'	Report	Giakoumakis (yellow card) 26'	Stadium: GelreDome; Attendance: 0 Referee: Allard Lindhout

18 April 2021 Final	Ajax	2–1	Vitesse	Rotterdam
18:00 CEST (UTC+2)	Gravenberch 23'; Neres 90+1'; Tagliafico (yellow card) 90+5'	Report	Openda 30'; Tannane (yellow card) 63'; Touré (yellow card) 72'; Wittek (yellow card) 74'; Rasmussen (red card) 86'; Bero (yellow card) 90+3'	Stadium: De Kuip; Attendance: 0 Referee: Björn Kuipers
