= 2019–20 SBV Vitesse season =

SBV Vitesse
2019–20 season
- Owner: Valeriy Oyf
- Chairman: Yevgeny Merkel
- Head coach: Leonid Slutsky
- Stadium: GelreDome
- Eredivisie: 7th
- KNVB Cup: Quarter-finals
- Top goalscorer: League: Bryan Linssen (14); All: Bryan Linssen (14)
Home colours	Away colours	Third colours

The 2019–20 season was SBV Vitesse's 127th season in existence and the club's 30th consecutive season in the top flight of Dutch football. In addition to the domestic league, SBV Vitesse participated in this season's edition of the KNVB Cup. The season covered the period from 1 July 2019 to 30 June 2020.

== Players ==
=== Current squad ===
As of 3 February 2020

Note: Flags indicate national team as defined under FIFA eligibility rules; some limited exceptions apply. Players may hold more than one non-FIFA nationality.

No.	Pos.	Nation	Player
1	GK	GRE	Kostas Lamprou
2	DF	NED	Julian Lelieveld
3	DF	NED	Armando Obispo (on loan from PSV)
5	DF	ENG	Max Clark
7	FW	NED	Jay-Roy Grot (on loan from Leeds)
8	MF	NOR	Sondre Tronstad
9	FW	SLO	Tim Matavž (vice captain)
10	MF	NED	Riechedly Bazoer
11	MF	NED	Bryan Linssen (captain)
14	MF	MAR	Oussama Tannane
15	FW	NOR	Filip Delaveris
16	FW	NED	Roy Beerens
17	DF	ISR	Eli Dasa
18	DF	CZE	Tomáš Hájek

No.	Pos.	Nation	Player
19	FW	NGR	Hilary Gong
20	FW	MLI	Nouha Dicko (on loan from Hull City)
21	MF	SVK	Matúš Bero
22	GK	NED	Remko Pasveer
27	FW	BEL	Charly Musonda (on loan from Chelsea)
28	DF	NED	Joshua Brenet (on loan from 1899 Hoffenheim)
29	FW	NED	Thomas Buitink
30	DF	NED	Danilho Doekhi
32	DF	NED	Özgür Aktas
36	MF	NED	Patrick Vroegh
37	MF	NED	Yassin Oukili
38	MF	NED	Richie Musaba
40	GK	NED	Bilal Bayazit

=== Players out on loan ===
Note: Flags indicate national team as defined under FIFA eligibility rules; some limited exceptions apply. Players may hold more than one non-FIFA nationality.

No.	Pos.	Nation	Player
—	GK	NED	Jeroen Houwen (on loan at Go Ahead Eagles until 30 June 2020)
—	DF	NED	Khalid Karami (on loan at Sparta Rotterdam until 30 June 2020)

No.	Pos.	Nation	Player
—	MF	NED	Thomas Bruns (on loan at VVV-Venlo until 30 June 2020)
—	FW	ALG	Oussama Darfalou (on loan at VVV-Venlo until 30 June 2020)

== Pre-season and friendlies ==
Win Draw Loss

20 July 2019 Friendly	Darmstadt 98	0–1	Vitesse	Darmstadt, Germany
14:00 CEST (UTC+2)	Đumić (yellow card) 79'	Report	Matavž 25'; Obispo (yellow card) 43'; Vroegh (yellow card) 50'	Stadium: Merck-Stadion am Böllenfalltor

24 July 2019 Friendly	Vitesse	1–1	Sivasspor	Driel, Netherlands
18:00 CEST (UTC+2)	Matavž 14'	Report	Koné 39'	Stadium: RKSV Driel; Attendance: 1,064

28 July 2019 Friendly	Bayer Leverkusen	1–1	Vitesse	Cologne, Germany
18:00 CEST (UTC+2)		Report		Stadium: Jugendfussball-Zentrum Kurtekotten Platz 2

11 January 2020 Friendly	Vitesse	1–3	MSV Duisburg	Albufeira, Portugal
16:00 CET (UTC+1)	Bazoer 49'	Report	Daschner 75'; Engin 76' (pen.); Slišković 81'	Stadium: Amendoeira Resort; Attendance: 100

== Competitions ==
Win Draw Loss

=== Overview ===
Competition	First match	Last match	Starting round	Final position	Record							
Competition	First match	Last match	Starting round	Final position	Pld	W	D	L	GF	GA	GD	Win %
Eredivisie	3 August 2019	7 March 2020	Matchday 1	7th	26	12	5	9	45	35	+10	46.15
KNVB Cup	29 October 2019	12 February 2020	First round	Quarter-finals	4	3	0	1	8	3	+5	75.00
Total					30	15	5	10	53	38	+15	50.00

Last updated: 7 March 2020
Source: Soccerway

=== Eredivisie ===
==== League table ====
Pos	Team	Pld	W	D	L	GF	GA	GD	Pts	Qualification or relegation
5	Willem II	26	13	5	8	37	34	+3	44	Qualification for the Europa League second qualifying round
6	FC Utrecht	25	12	5	8	50	34	+16	41	
7	Vitesse	26	12	5	9	45	35	+10	41	
8	Heracles Almelo	26	10	6	10	40	34	+6	36	
9	FC Groningen	26	10	5	11	27	26	+1	35	

Source: eredivisie.nl
Rules for classification: Season in progress: 1) Most points won; 2) Less points lost; 3) Goal difference; 4) Goals scored; 5) Alphabetical order; End of season: 1) Points; 2) Goal difference; 3) Goals scored; 4) Head-to-head points; 5) Head-to-head goal difference; 6) Head-to-head away goals scored; 7) Play-off if relevant for deciding champion, relegation or participating in a European league, otherwise by draw. 8) Penalty shoot-out (only after a play-off)

==== Results summary ====
Overall								Home						Away					
Pld	W	D	L	GF	GA	GD	Pts	W	D	L	GF	GA	GD	W	D	L	GF	GA	GD
26	12	5	9	45	35	+10	41	7	3	3	24	15	+9	5	2	6	21	20	+1

Last updated: 7 March 2020.
Source: Eredivisie

==== Results by round ====
Round	1	2	3	4	5	6	7	8	9	10	11	12	13	14	15	16	17	18	19	20	21	22	23	24	25	26	27	28	29	30	31	32	33	34
Ground	H	A	H	A	H	A	H	A	H	A	H	A	H	A	A	H	A	H	A	H	A	A	H	H	A	H	A	H	A	H	A	H	H	A
Result	D	W	W	D	W	L	W	W	W	W	L	L	L	L	L	D	W	W	W	D	D	L	W	L	L	W	C	C	C	C	C	C	C	C
Position	10	8	3	5	3	5	4	4	4	3	4	5	5	5	9	9	8	6	6	6	6	6	6	6	7	7	7	7	7	7	7	7	7	7

Updated to match(es) played on 7 March 2020. Source: Eredivisie
A = Away; H = Home; W = Win; D = Draw; L = Loss

==== Matches ====
The Eredivisie schedule was announced on 14 June 2019. The 2019–20 season was abandoned on 24 April 2020, due to the coronavirus pandemic in the Netherlands.

3 August 2019 1	Vitesse	2–2	Ajax	Arnhem
18:30 CEST (UTC+2)	Bero 13', (yellow card) 23'; Bazoer 55', (yellow card) 82' (yellow-red card) 85'	Report	Van de Beek 30'; Veltman (yellow card) 71'; Tagliafico (yellow card) 73'; Blind (yellow card) 74'; Tadić 75'	Stadium: GelreDome; Attendance: 18,100; Referee: Bas Nijhuis

10 August 2019 2	Willem II	0–2	Vitesse	Tilburg
20:45 CEST (UTC+2)		Report		Stadium: Koning Willem II Stadion; Attendance: 12,825; Referee: Edwin van de Graaf

16 August 2019 3	Vitesse	3–0	PEC Zwolle	Arnhem
20:45 CEST (UTC+2)				Stadium: GelreDome

24 August 2019 4	Heracles Almelo	1–1	Vitesse	Almelo
20:45 CEST (UTC+2)				Stadium: Erve Asito

1 September 2019 5	Vitesse	2–1	AZ	Arnhem
16:45 CEST (UTC+2)	Matavž 45+1'; Bero 90+6' (pen.)	Report	Koopmeiners 33' (pen.)	Stadium: GelreDome; Attendance: 13,290; Referee: Dennis Higler

14 September 2019 6	PSV	5–0	Vitesse	Eindhoven
20:45 CEST (UTC+2)	Malen 18', 36', 46', 83', 89'	Report	Bazoer (yellow card) 73'	Stadium: Philips Stadion; Attendance: 33,300; Referee: Pol van Boekel

21 September 2019 7	SBV Vitesse	4–2	Fortuna Sittard	Arnhem
20:45 CEST (UTC+2)		Report		Stadium: GelreDome; Attendance: 20,800; Referee: Joey Kooij

29 September 2019 8	RKC Waalwijk	1–2	Vitesse	Waalwijk
20:45 CEST (UTC+2)				Stadium: Mandemakers Stadion

5 October 2019 9	Vitesse	2–1	Utrecht	Arnhem
19:45 CEST (UTC+2)		Report		Stadium: GelreDome

19 October 2019 10	VVV-Venlo	0–4	Vitesse	Venlo
20:45 CEST (UTC+2)				Stadium: De Koel

26 October 2019 11	Vitesse	0–2	ADO Den Haag	Arnhem
19:45 CEST (UTC+2)		Report		Stadium: GelreDome; Attendance: 12,663; Referee: Jeroen Manschot

3 November 2019 12	Emmen	2–1	Vitesse	Emmen
19:45 CET (UTC+1)				Stadium: De Oude Meerdijk

8 November 2019 13	Vitesse	1–2	Groningen	Arnhem
19:45 CET (UTC+1)				Stadium: GelreDome

24 November 2019 14	Sparta Rotterdam	2–0	Vitesse	Rotterdam
19:45 CET (UTC+1)				Stadium: Sparta Stadion

29 November 2019 15	SC Heerenveen	3–2	Vitesse	Heerenveen
20:15 CET (UTC+1)				Stadium: Abe Lenstra Stadion

8 December 2019 16	Vitesse	0–0	Feyenoord	Arnhem
12:15 CET (UTC+1)				Stadium: GelreDome; Attendance: 16,455; Referee: Pol van Boekel

14 December 2019 17	Twente	0–3	Vitesse	Enschede
20:45 CET (UTC+1)		Report	Linssen 51', 72'; Dicko 61'	Stadium: De Grolsch Veste; Attendance: 26,500; Referee: Allard Lindhout

22 December 2019 18	Vitesse	3–0	VVV-Venlo	Arnhem
19:45 CET (UTC+1)				Stadium: GelreDome

18 January 2020 19	Fortuna Sittard	1–3	Vitesse	Sittard
18:30 CET (UTC+1)	Smeets (yellow card) 26'; Dammers (yellow card) 32'; Ciss 72'	Report	Bero (yellow card) 14'; Tannane 26'; Matavž 39', 64'; Lelieveld (yellow card) 89'	Stadium: Fortuna Sittard Stadion; Attendance: 8,238; Referee: Sander van der Eijk

26 January 2020 20	Vitesse	1–1	Emmen	Arnhem
18:30 CET (UTC+1)				Stadium: GelreDome

1 February 2020 21	ADO Den Haag	0–0	Vitesse	The Hague
18:30 CET (UTC+1)		Report		Stadium: Cars Jeans Stadion; Attendance: 12,387; Referee: Joey Kooij

8 February 2020 22	Groningen	1–0	Vitesse	Groningen
18:30 CET (UTC+1)				Stadium: Euroborg

16 February 2020 23	Vitesse	4–2	SC Heerenveen	Arnhem
18:30 CET (UTC+1)				Stadium: GelreDome

23 February 2020 24	Vitesse	1–2	PSV	Arnhem
14:30 CET (UTC+1)	Obispo (yellow card) 36'; Matavž 50'	Report	Lammers 59' (pen.); Gakpo 63'	Stadium: GelreDome; Attendance: 15,509; Referee: Danny Makkelie

29 February 2020 25	PEC Zwolle	4–3	Vitesse	Zwolle
18:30 CET (UTC+1)				Stadium: MAC³PARK Stadion

7 March 2020 26	Vitesse	1–0	Twente	Arnhem
19:45 CET (UTC+1)	Tronstad (yellow card) 8'; Bazoer (yellow card) 11'; Grot 70'; Linssen (yellow card) 81'	Report	Selahi (yellow card) 48'; Bijen (yellow card) 71'; Menig (yellow card) 79'	Stadium: GelreDome; Attendance: 14,210; Referee: Richard Martens

14 March 2020 27	Utrecht	Cancelled	Vitesse	Utrecht
20:45 CET (UTC+1)				Stadium: Stadion Galgenwaard
Note: Match was initially scheduled for 14 March, but cancelled due to the COVID-19 pandemic in the Netherlands.

21 March 2020 28	Vitesse	Cancelled	Willem II	Arnhem
19:45 CET (UTC+1)				Stadium: GelreDome
Note: Match was initially scheduled for 21 March, but cancelled due to the COVID-19 pandemic in the Netherlands.

4 April 2020 29	AZ	Cancelled	Vitesse	Alkmaar
20:45 CEST (UTC+2)				Stadium: AFAS Stadion
Note: Match was initially scheduled for 4 April, but cancelled due to the COVID-19 pandemic in the Netherlands.

11 April 2020 30	Vitesse	Cancelled	RKC Waalwijk	Arnhem
18:30 CEST (UTC+2)				Stadium: GelreDome
Note: Match was initially scheduled for 11 April 2020, but cancelled due to the COVID-19 pandemic in the Netherlands.

23 April 2020 31	Ajax	Cancelled	Vitesse	Amsterdam
18:30 CEST (UTC+2)				Stadium: Johan Cruyff Arena
Note: Match was initially scheduled for 23 April 2020, but cancelled due to the COVID-19 pandemic in the Netherlands.

26 April 2020 32	Vitesse	Cancelled	Sparta Rotterdam	Arnhem
18:30 CEST (UTC+2)				Stadium: GelreDome
Note: Match was initially scheduled for 26 April 2020, but cancelled due to the COVID-19 pandemic in the Netherlands.

3 May 2020 33	Vitesse	Cancelled	Heracles Almelo	Arnhem
18:30 CEST (UTC+2)				Stadium: GelreDome
Note: Match was initially scheduled for 3 May 2020, but cancelled due to the COVID-19 pandemic in the Netherlands.

10 May 2020 34	Feyenoord	Cancelled	Vitesse	Rotterdam
14:30 CEST (UTC+2)				Stadium: De Kuip
Note: Match was initially scheduled for 10 May, but cancelled due to the COVID-19 pandemic in the Netherlands.

=== KNVB Cup ===
29 October 2019 First round	Vitesse	2–0	De Graafschap	Arnhem
18:30 CET (UTC+1)	Darfalou 3'; Dicko 68'	Report		Stadium: GelreDome; Referee: Allard Lindhout

17 December 2019 Second round	Vitesse	4–0	ODIN '59	Arnhem
19:45 CET (UTC+1)	Buitink 24'; Darfalou 28'; Vroeg 30'; Hájek 42'	Report		Stadium: GelreDome; Referee: Clay Ruperti

22 January 2020 Round of 16	Heracles Almelo	0–2	Vitesse	Almelo
18:30 CET (UTC+1)		Report	Tannane 11'; Matavž 60'	Stadium: Polman Stadion; Referee: Jochem Kamphuis

12 February 2020 Quarter-finals	Vitesse	0–3	Ajax	Arnhem
20:45 CET (UTC+1)	Matavž (yellow card) 22' (yellow-red card) 83'; Linssen (yellow card) 90'	Report	Babel (yellow card) 22', (goal) 32'; Van de Beek (yellow card) 39'; Eiting (yellow card) 69'; Gravenberch 76'; Tadić 85' (pen.)	Stadium: GelreDome; Attendance: 18,389; Referee: Bas Nijhuis
