= Enzo Cornelisse =

Dutch footballer (born 2002)

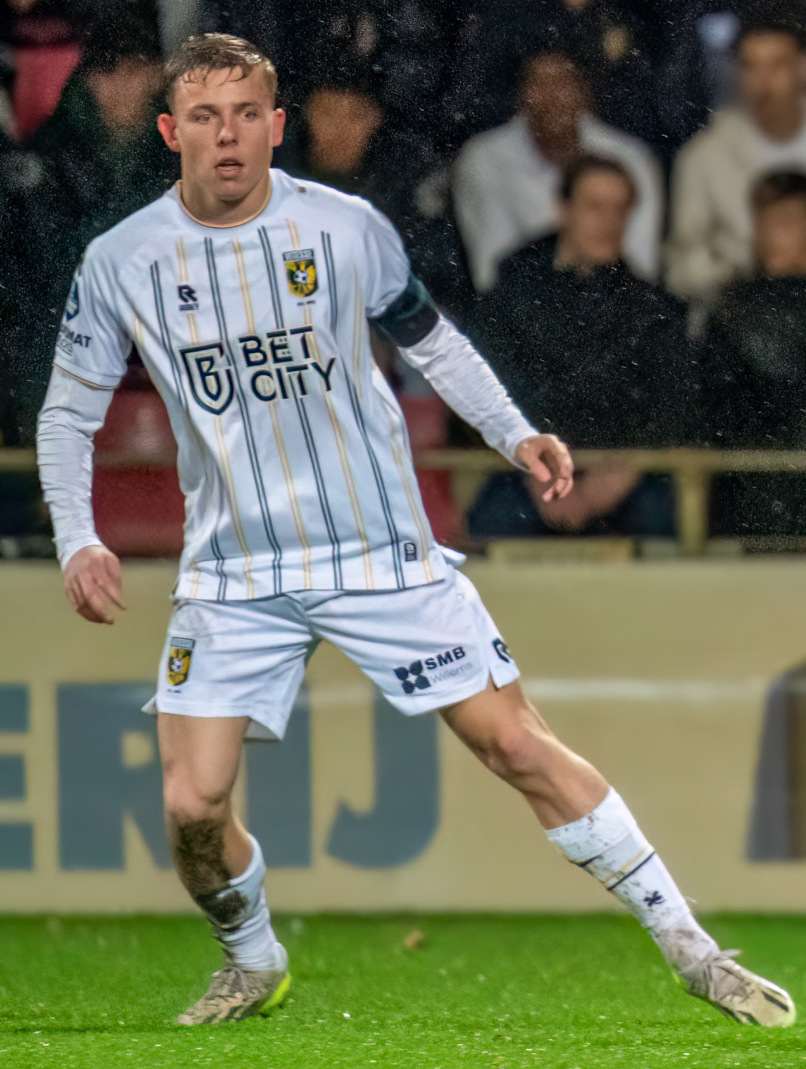
- Cornelisse with Vitesse in 2023

Personal information
- Date of birth: 29 June 2002 (age 24)
- Place of birth: Arnhem, Netherlands
- Height: 1.78 m (5 ft 10 in)
- Positions: Centre-back; defensive midfielder

Team information
- Current team: Almere City
- Number: 6

Youth career
- –2011: ESA Rijkerswoerd
- 2011–2020: Vitesse

Senior career*
Years	Team	Apps	(Gls)
2020–2025	Vitesse	103	(2)
2025–	Almere City	31	(1)
- * Club domestic league appearances and goals as of 25 April 2026

Enzo Cornelisse (born 29 June 2002) is a Dutch professional footballer who plays as a centre-back or defensive midfielder for Eerste Divisie club Almere City.

== Career ==
Born in Arnhem, the Netherlands, Cornelisse started playing football at ESA Rijkerswoerd and later developed his football skills at Vitesse, where he signed his first professional contract on 26 June 2020, at the age of 17. After training with the senior squad during the pre-season, Cornelisse was promoted to the first team in August 2020. He made his professional debut in the Eredivisie on 3 October 2020, as a substitute for Thomas Bruns during a 3–0 victory against Heracles Almelo.

On 30 June 2021, Vitesse extended Cornelisse's contract by three years, securing his services until June 2024. In his early professional career, Cornelisse often served as a substitute, facing significant competition for a starting spot from players such as Danilho Doekhi, Jacob Rasmussen, and Riechedly Bazoer. Despite limited playing time, particularly during the 2021–22 season, and his expressed interest in leaving the club in January 2022, Vitesse opted to retain him, citing his potential value in the event of a departure by one of their regular starters.

Cornelisse started more regularly for Vitesse in the 2023–24 season, thriving in a defensive midfield role under head coach Phillip Cocu. Vitesse suffered relegation at the end of the season after being deducted eighteen points for failing to comply with the Royal Dutch Football Association (KNVB)'s license requirements amid continuous financial troubles.

Cornelisse followed Vitesse down the Eerste Divisie and established himself as a starter at centre-back as the club's financial struggles continued.

On 28 May 2025, Cornelisse signed a three-season contract with Almere City.

== Personal life ==
Cornelisse is the son of Tim Cornelisse, and the nephew of Yuri Cornelisse who were both professional footballers.

== Career statistics ==
As of match played 13 December 2024

Appearances and goals by club, season and competition
Club	Season	League			National cup		Other		Total	
Club	Season	Division	Apps	Goals	Apps	Goals	Apps	Goals	Apps	Goals
Vitesse	2020–21	Eredivisie	6	0	0	0	—		6	0
Vitesse	2021–22	Eredivisie	13	0	1	0	2 (Note: Appearances in Eredivisie play-offs)	0	16	0
Vitesse	2022–23	Eredivisie	20	0	1	0	—		21	0
Vitesse	2023–24	Eredivisie	27	0	4	0	—		31	0
Vitesse	2024–25	Eerste Divisie	19	0	1	0	—		20	0
Career total			85	0	7	0	2	0	94	0
