= Remko Pasveer =

Dutch footballer (born 1983)

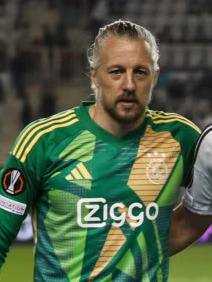
- Pasveer lining up for Ajax in 2024

Personal information
- Full name: Remko Jurian Pasveer
- Date of birth: 8 November 1983 (age 43)
- Place of birth: Enschede, Netherlands
- Height: 1.88 m (6 ft 2 in)
- Position: Goalkeeper

Team information
- Current team: Twente
- Number: 22

Youth career
- SC Enschede
- –2003: Twente

Senior career*
Years	Team	Apps	(Gls)
2003–2006	Twente	14	(0)
2006–2014	Heracles Almelo	134	(0)
2008–2010	→ Go Ahead Eagles (loan)	74	(0)
2014–2017	PSV	5	(0)
2017–2021	Vitesse	92	(0)
2021–2026	Ajax	63	(0)
2026	Heracles Almelo	11	(0)
2026–	Twente	0	(0)

International career
2022	Netherlands	2	(0)
Medal record
Men's football
Representing Netherlands
UEFA European Under-21 Championship
Winner	2006
- * Club domestic league appearances and goals as of 21 May 2026

Remko Jurian Pasveer (born 8 November 1983) is a Dutch professional footballer who plays as a goalkeeper for Eredivisie club Twente.

== Club career ==
=== Twente ===
Pasveer started playing football at local SC Enschede. He then moved to FC Twente, where he was reserve goalkeeper from 2003 to 2006, behind Cees Paauwe and Sander Boschker.

=== Heracles Almelo ===
In the summer of 2006, he left for Heracles Almelo, where he initially again had a role as backup goalkeeper, now behind Martin Pieckenhagen. In the 2008–09 and 2009–10 seasons, Pasveer was sent on loan to Go Ahead Eagles, who at the time played in the second-tier Eerste Divisie. After a difficult start, he grew into a fan favourite in Deventer. For the 2010–11 season, Pasveer returned to Heracles, this time to in the role as starting goalkeeper. He remained as starter for four years, after which he decided not to sign a contract extension.

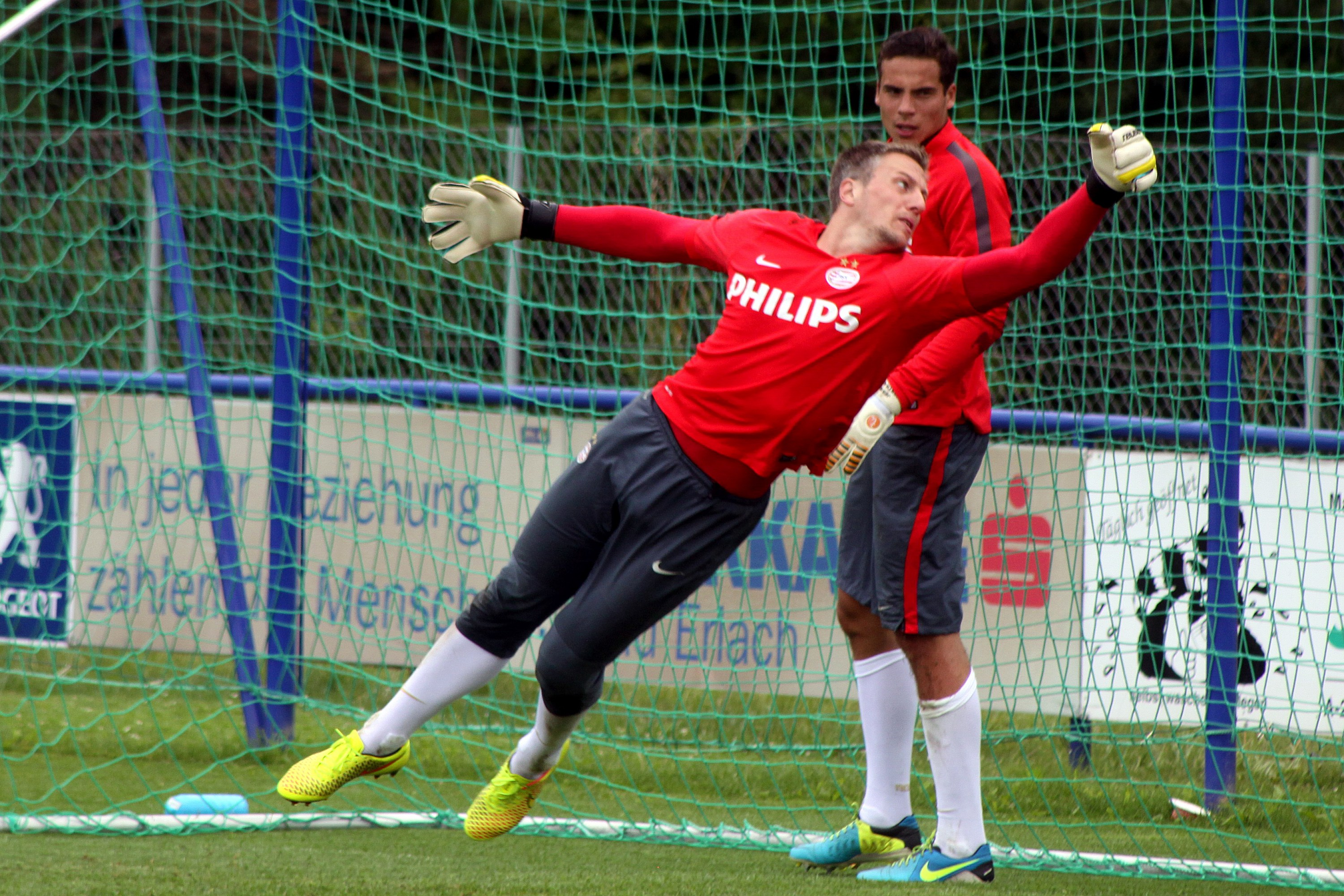
Remko Pasveer during PSV's teamcamp in Bad Erlach, Austria, July 2014

=== PSV ===
In the summer of 2014, Pasveer signed a three-year contract with PSV, where he had to compete with first goalkeeper Jeroen Zoet. He made his official debut for the Eindhoven-based club on 21 August 2014, during the first of two legs against Belarusian club Shakhtyor Soligorsk in the final qualifying round for the 2014–15 UEFA Europa League. Pasveer played the entire match, which his club won 1–0 at home. He played several more times that season in both KNVB Cup and Europa League matches. A week after PSV secured the Eredivisie title, Pasveer also made his league debut for the club in matchday 32 against Excelsior. PSV triggered an option in his contract in May 2015 and thus committed him to the club until mid-2018. Pasveer won the national title with PSV for the second time in a row on 8 May 2016. The club started the last matchday of the season with as many points as rivals Ajax, but with a goal difference of –6. PSV then won 1–3 at PEC Zwolle that day, while Ajax drew 1–1 at De Graafschap. He did not make a league appearance that season, but only played in the cup tournament. Pasveer made his UEFA Champions League debut on 1 November 2016. Due to an injury from Zoet, he a made a start in the 1–2 lost group match at home against Bayern Munich. Pasveer made three league appearances during the 2016–17 season. Zoet, who was the starter that season, only conceded 23 goals in 31 appearances. With that, PSV had the statistically best defense in the Eredivisie that year, alongside the Ajax defense. The Eindhoven team finished third that season.

=== Vitesse ===
Pasveer signed with Vitesse in July 2017. He made his debut on 5 August 2017 during the lost game for the Johan Cruyff Shield against Feyenoord. His first year under head coach Leonid Slutsky was difficult, but eventually he grew into a starter and team captain. In the 2019–20 season, he was voted "Player of the Year" by Vitesse fans.

=== Ajax ===
On 23 April 2021, it was announced that Pasveer had signed a two-year contract with Ajax, joining the club on a free transfer from 1 July. He made his debut for the club on 7 August in a 4–0 loss to PSV in the Johan Cruyff Shield. Due to suspensions and injuries for goalkeepers André Onana and Maarten Stekelenburg, Pasveer stayed on as the starter in goal. On 19 October 2021 Pasveer earned a record as the first goalkeeper to stop three direct shots on goal from Norwegian striker Erling Haaland in a UEFA Champions League match. Pasveer went on to keep a clean sheet against Borussia Dortmund as the match ended a 4–0 win for Ajax. Four days later, Pasveer kept a clean-sheet once more, in a regular season match, as Ajax defeated his former club, and rivals PSV Eindhoven 5–0 at home. He conceded only two goals in the domestic league prior to matchday 12, played on 7 November 2021. This proved to be a record, as no goalkeeper in the Eredivisie had conceded so few goals during the first twelve games before. This yielded an impressive average of one goal against every four matches, both at national and international level.

During the 2024–25 Europa League qualifying phase, he managed to save five shots and score one during the penalty shootouts against Panathinaikos which ended in a 13–12 victory following a 1–1 draw on aggregate.

=== Return to Heracles Almelo ===
After losing the first-choice goalkeeping spot to Vítězslav Jaroš in the first half of the 2025–26 season with Ajax, on 29 January 2026, Pasveer returned to Heracles Almelo on a short-term deal until the end of the season to help with the club's relegation battle.

=== Return to Twente ===
On 2 July 2026, Pasveer returned to Twente on a free transfer, while also being appointed to work as a goalkeeping coach.

== International career ==
Pasveer was part of the Netherlands squad that won the 2006 UEFA European Under-21 Championship in Portugal.

Pasveer was named in the final Netherlands squad for the 2022 FIFA World Cup.

On 22 September 2022, Pasveer made his debut for the Netherlands as a starter against Poland in a 2022–23 UEFA Nations League match. At age 38, he was the second oldest player to ever debut for the Dutch national team, after Sander Boschker in 2010 (aged 39).

== Career statistics ==
=== Club ===
As of match played 17 December 2025

Appearances and goals by club, season and competition
Club	Season	League			KNVB Cup		Europe		Other		Total	
Club	Season	Division	Apps	Goals	Apps	Goals	Apps	Goals	Apps	Goals	Apps	Goals
Twente	2003–04	Eredivisie	4	0	0	0	—		—		4	0
Twente	2004–05	Eredivisie	2	0	0	0	—		—		2	0
Twente	2005–06	Eredivisie	8	0	0	0	—		—		8	0
Twente	Total		14	0	0	0	—		—		14	0
Go Ahead Eagles (loan)	2008–09	Eerste Divisie	38	0	1	0	—		—		39	0
Go Ahead Eagles (loan)	2009–10	Eerste Divisie	36	0	5	0	—		4 (Note: Appearances in Eerste Divisie promotion play-offs)	0	45	0
Go Ahead Eagles (loan)	Total		74	0	6	0	—		4	0	84	0
Heracles Almelo	2010–11	Eredivisie	34	0	2	0	—		2 (Note: Appearances in Eredivisie European play-offs)	0	38	0
Heracles Almelo	2011–12	Eredivisie	34	0	5	0	—		—		39	0
Heracles Almelo	2012–13	Eredivisie	33	0	4	0	—		—		37	0
Heracles Almelo	2013–14	Eredivisie	33	0	3	0	—		—		36	0
Heracles Almelo	Total		134	0	14	0	—		2	0	150	0
PSV	2014–15	Eredivisie	2	0	3	0	3 (Note: Appearances in UEFA Europa League)	0	—		8	0
PSV	2015–16	Eredivisie	0	0	4	0	0	0	0	0	4	0
PSV	2016–17	Eredivisie	3	0	2	0	1 (Note: Appearance(s) in UEFA Champions League)	0	0	0	6	0
PSV	Total		5	0	9	0	4	0	0	0	18	0
Vitesse	2017–18	Eredivisie	26	0	1	0	6	0	1 (Note: Appearance in Johan Cruyff Shield)	0	34	0
Vitesse	2018–19	Eredivisie	7	0	2	0	0	0	4 (Note: Appearances in Eredivisie Europa League play-offs)	0	13	0
Vitesse	2019–20	Eredivisie	26	0	2	0	—		—		28	0
Vitesse	2020–21	Eredivisie	33	0	2	0	—		—		35	0
Vitesse	Total		92	0	7	0	6	0	5	0	110	0
Ajax	2021–22	Eredivisie	20	0	1	0	6	0	1	0	28	0
Ajax	2022–23	Eredivisie	15	0	1	0	6	0	0	0	22	0
Ajax	2023–24	Eredivisie	0	0	0	0	0	0	—		0	0
Ajax	2024–25	Eredivisie	24	0	2	0	17	0	—		43	0
Ajax	2025–26	Eredivisie	4	0	1	0	2	0	—		7	0
Ajax	Total		63	0	5	0	31	0	1	0	100	0
Career total			382	0	41	0	41	0	15	0	476	0

=== International ===
Appearances and goals by national team and year
National team	Year	Apps	Goals
Netherlands	2022	2	0
Total		2	0

== Honours ==
Heracles Almelo

- KNVB Cup runner-up: 2011–12

PSV

- Eredivisie: 2014–15, 2015–16
- Johan Cruyff Shield: 2016, 2017

Ajax

- Eredivisie: 2021–22

Netherlands U21

- UEFA European Under-21 Championship: 2006

Individual

- Vitesse Player of the Year: 2019–20
- Eredivisie Team of the Month: November 2024
