= Matúš Bero =

Slovak international footballer

Personal information
- Date of birth: 6 September 1995 (age 31)
- Place of birth: Ilava, Slovakia
- Height: 1.81 m (5 ft 11 in)
- Position: Midfielder

Team information
- Current team: Ferencváros
- Number: 22

Youth career
- 2005–2014: AS Trenčín

Senior career*
Years	Team	Apps	(Gls)
2013–2016	AS Trenčín	77	(23)
2016–2018	Trabzonspor	38	(3)
2018–2023	Vitesse	143	(20)
2023–2026	VfL Bochum	76	(6)
2026–	Ferencváros	3	(1)

International career^{‡}
2011–2012	Slovakia U17	3	(0)
2012	Slovakia U18	1	(0)
2013–2014	Slovakia U19	4	(6)
2015	Slovakia U20	1	(0)
2015–2017	Slovakia U21	12	(2)
2016–	Slovakia	51	(1)
- * Club domestic league appearances and goals as of 10 November 2026 ‡ National team caps and goals as of 15 November 2026

Matúš Bero (born 6 September 1995) is a Slovak professional footballer who plays as a midfielder for Nemzeti Bajnokság I club Ferencvárosi TC and the Slovakia national team.

== Club career ==
=== AS Trenčín ===
Bero began his professional career at AS Trenčín, where he went through all the youth categories, playing as a defender. Bero debuted for the senior side on 21 July 2013 in the Corgoň Liga match against Spartak Trnava, where his club lost 1-2.

During the 2014–15 Slovak First Football League, Bero won the Slovak Football Cup with AS Trenčín in the final against FK Senica, where the match was decided in a penalty shootout. He also became the champion of the Fortuna Liga and celebrated winning a double.

In the 2015–16 Slovak First Football League, Bero scored his first hat-trick on 27 September 2015 against MFK Skalica, where Trenčín won 3-0. Near the end of the season, he defended the double with his team.

=== Trabzonspor ===
At the beginning of the 2016–17 Süper Lig, Bero transferred to Trabzonspor for 2.5 million Euros.

=== Vitesse ===
On 3 July 2018, Bero agreed to join Eredivisie club Vitesse on a four-year contract. On 18 November 2021, he extended his contract at the club until 2023 with an option for another year.

=== VfL Bochum ===
On 27 June 2023, Bero signed a three-year contract with Bundesliga team VfL Bochum. After just seven minutes during the match against Borussia Mönchengladbach on 30 September, in which Bochum lost 1-3, he suffered from a knee injury that would rule him out for several weeks. On 20 January 2024, Bero made a comeback with his first goal in a 1–0 league victory against VfB Stuttgart.

=== Ferencváros ===
On 1 September, he was signed by Nemzeti Bajnokság I club Ferencvárosi TC.

== International career ==
Having represented various Slovak youth teams, Bero debuted for the senior side in a 3–1 friendly victory over Georgia on 27 May 2016. He was omitted from the final 26-man squad for the rescheduled UEFA Euro 2020.

During the 2022 FIFA World Cup qualification against Croatia, Bero replaced Marek Hamšík after the latter announced his international retirement, which ended in a 2-2 draw. On 13 June 2022, Bero scored his first international goal during a 2022–23 UEFA Nations League C match against Kazakhstan, ending in a 1–2 loss to the Slovaks.

== Personal life ==
On 10 January 2022, Bero and his partner, Klaudia Fraňová, were announced to expect a child. Their daughter, Matea Tanya, was born on 16 May 2022.

== Career statistics ==
=== Club ===
As of match played 17 May 2026

Appearances and goals by club, season and competition
Club	Season	League			Cup		Europe		Other		Total	
Club	Season	Division	Apps	Goals	Apps	Goals	Apps	Goals	Apps	Goals	Apps	Goals
Trenčín	2013–14	Fortuna Liga	26	3	0	0	1 (Note: Appearance(s) in UEFA Europa League)	0	—		27	3
Trenčín	2014–15	Fortuna Liga	18	5	5	0	—		—		23	5
Trenčín	2015–16	Fortuna Liga	30	15	5	1	2 (Note: Appearance(s) in UEFA Champions League)	1	—		37	17
Trenčín	2016–17	Fortuna Liga	3	0	0	0	4	1	—		7	1
Trenčín	Total		77	23	10	1	7	2	—		94	26
Trabzonspor	2016–17	Süper Lig	23	2	2	0	—		—		25	2
Trabzonspor	2017–18	Süper Lig	15	1	4	0	—		—		19	1
Trabzonspor	Total		38	3	6	0	—		—		44	3
Vitesse	2018–19	Eredivisie	30	9	3	1	3	0	1 (Note: Appearance(s) in Eredivisie European play-offs)	0	37	10
Vitesse	2019–20	Eredivisie	22	3	4	0	—		—		26	3
Vitesse	2020–21	Eredivisie	27	2	4	1	—		—		31	3
Vitesse	2021–22	Eredivisie	31	1	2	0	12 (Note: Appearances in UEFA Europa Conference League)	4	—		45	5
Vitesse	2022–23	Eredivisie	31	5	1	0	—		—		32	5
Vitesse	Total		143	20	14	1	15	4	1	0	173	25
VfL Bochum	2023–24	Bundesliga	24	1	1	0	—		2 (Note: Appearances in Relegation Playoffs)	0	27	1
VfL Bochum	2024–25	Bundesliga	30	5	1	0	—		—		31	5
VfL Bochum	2025–26	2. Bundesliga	22	0	1	0	—		—		23	0
VfL Bochum	Total		76	6	3	0	—		2	0	86	6
Ferencváros	2026–27	Nemzeti Bajnokság I	0	0	0	0	0	0	—		0	0
Career total			332	52	31	3	22	6	3	0	390	62

=== International ===
As of match played 13 November 2026

Appearances and goals by national team and year
National team	Year	Apps	Goals
Slovakia	2016	3	0
Slovakia	2017	2	0
Slovakia	2018	3	0
Slovakia	2019	3	0
Slovakia	2020	2	0
Slovakia	2021	4	0
Slovakia	2022	8	1
Slovakia	2023	4	0
Slovakia	2024	7	0
Slovakia	2025	10	0
Slovakia	2026	5	0
Total		51	1

As of match played 30 June 2024
Scores and results list Slovakia's goal tally first, score column indicates score after each Bero goal.

List of international goals scored by Matúš Bero
No.	Date	Venue	Cap	Opponent	Score	Result	Competition
1	13 June 2022	Astana Arena, Nur-Sultan, Kazakhstan	21	Kazakhstan	1–2	1–2	2022–23 UEFA Nations League C

== Honours ==
AS Trenčín

- Fortuna Liga: 2014–15, 2015–16
- Slovnaft Cup: 2014–15, 2015–16

Individual

- Fortuna Liga Young Player of the Year 2014–15
- Peter Dubovský Award: 2015
