= Armando Broja =

Albanian footballer (born 2001)

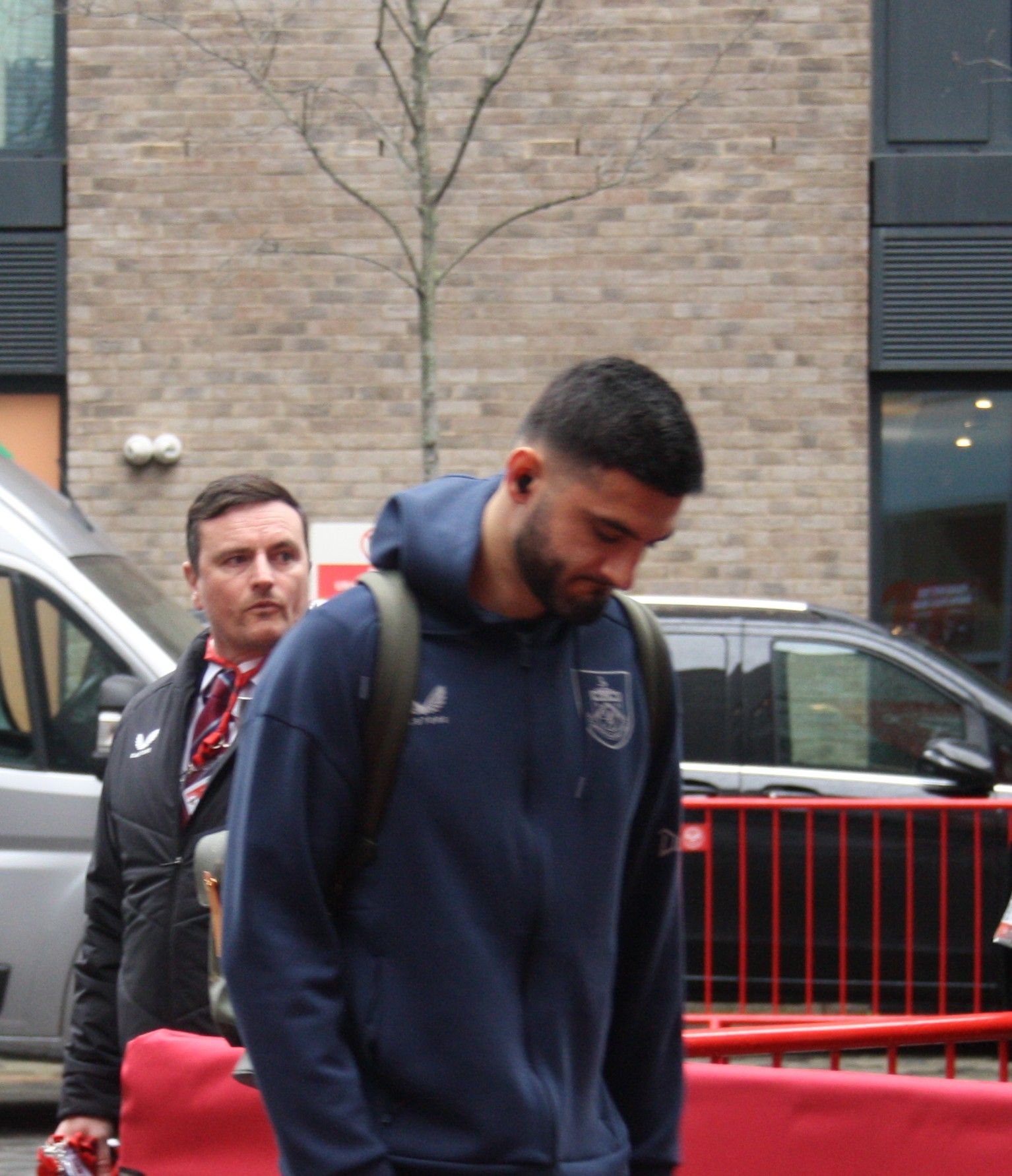
- Broja with Burnley in 2025

Personal information
- Full name: Armando Broja
- Date of birth: 10 September 2001 (age 25)
- Place of birth: Slough, England
- Height: 1.91 m (6 ft 3 in)
- Position: Striker

Team information
- Current team: Burnley
- Number: 27

Youth career
- 2006–2007: Burnham Juniors
- 2007–2009: Tottenham Hotspur
- 2009–2020: Chelsea

Senior career*
Years	Team	Apps	(Gls)
2020–2025	Chelsea	26	(2)
2020–2021	→ Vitesse (loan)	30	(10)
2021–2022	→ Southampton (loan)	32	(6)
2024	→ Fulham (loan)	8	(0)
2024–2025	→ Everton (loan)	10	(0)
2025–	Burnley	33	(1)

International career^{‡}
2019	Albania U19	7	(6)
2019–2021	Albania U21	6	(4)
2020–	Albania	37	(6)
- * Club domestic league appearances and goals as of 09:12, 27 October 2026 (UTC) ‡ National team caps and goals as of 6 June 2026

Armando Broja (Albanian pronunciation: [aɾˈmando bɾɔja]; born 10 September 2001) is a professional footballer who plays as a striker for EFL Championship club Burnley. Born in England, he plays for the Albania national team.

== Club career ==
=== Early career ===
Broja was born in Slough, England to Albanian parents from Koplik, Malësi e Madhe District. He began his football career with Burnham Juniors, then had trials with Reading and Fulham, before signing with Tottenham Hotspur and joining their under-8 selection.

=== Chelsea ===
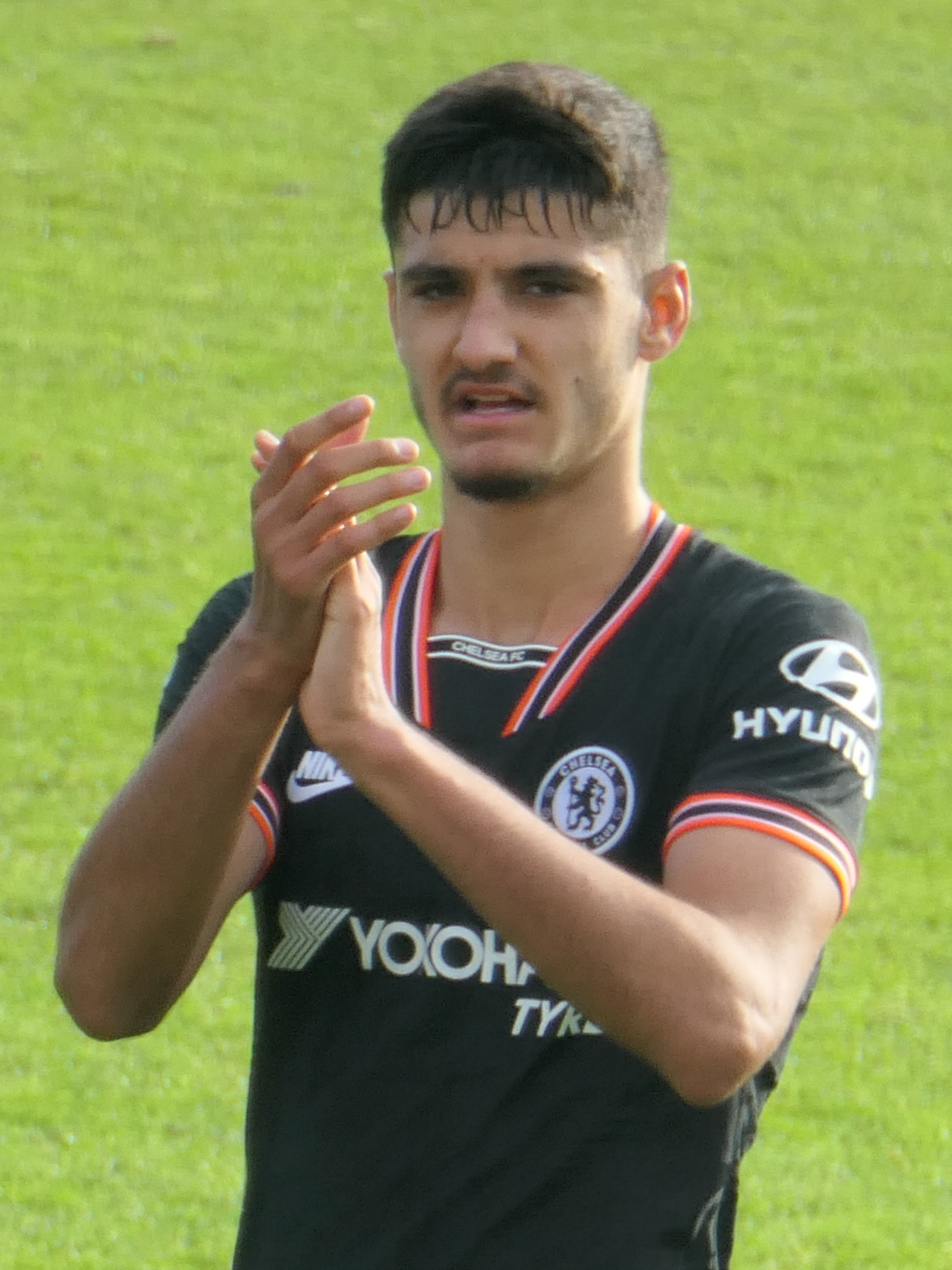
Broja with Chelsea in 2019

After a two-year stint at Tottenham, Broja transferred to Chelsea and joined their academy in 2009. With the under-18 side, he won the domestic treble of U18 Premier League, U18 Premier League Cup and FA Youth Cup in 2017–18. He also won the Premier League 2 with the under-23s in 2019–20, scoring three goals in ten appearances.

On 26 February 2020, Broja signed his first professional contract with the club after agreeing to a two-year deal. On 8 March, he made his professional debut in a 4–0 Premier League win against Everton after coming on as a substitute in the 86th minute in place of Olivier Giroud.

==== 2020–21 season: Loan to Vitesse ====
On 21 August 2020, Broja signed for Vitesse on a season-long loan. On 19 September, he scored his first ever league goal in a 2–0 win over Sparta Rotterdam. Broja finished his loan spell at Vitesse as their joint-top scorer in the Eredivisie for the 2020–21 season, netting ten goals.

==== 2021–22 season: Loan to Southampton ====
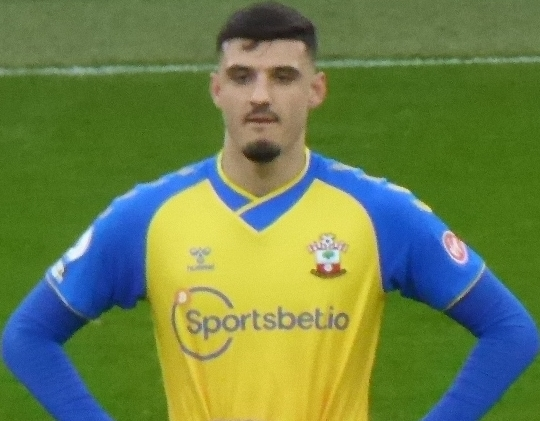
Broja with Southampton in 2022

On 18 July 2021, Broja signed a new five-year contract with Chelsea. On 10 August 2021, he was loaned to fellow Premier League club Southampton for the 2021–22 season.

On his debut on 25 August, he scored two goals in an 8–0 win over League Two side Newport County in the second round of the EFL Cup. On 16 October, Broja scored his first league goal for The Saints in a 1–0 win against Leeds United, and became the first Albanian player to score in the Premier League.

==== 2022–23 season ====
On 2 September 2022, Broja signed a new long-term contract with Chelsea until 2028. He scored his first goal for the club on 8 October 2022 against Wolverhampton Wanderers, helping Chelsea seal a 3–0 win. In December 2022, he was ruled out for the rest of the season after suffering a knee injury in a friendly game against Aston Villa during the international break for the 2022 FIFA World Cup.

==== 2023–24 season: Loan to Fulham ====
After scoring two goals in 19 games across all competitions for Chelsea in the first half of the season, Broja was sent on loan to fellow Premier League side Fulham on 1 February 2024, signing a contract until the end of the season. He made his debut on 3 February, coming on as a 74th-minute substitute for Rodrigo Muniz in a 2–2 away draw to Burnley in the Premier League.

==== 2024–25 season: Loan to Everton ====
On 30 August 2024, shortly before the transfer window closed, Broja signed for fellow Premier League side Everton on a season-long loan with an option to make the transfer permanent.

=== Burnley ===
On 8 August 2025, Broja joined fellow Premier League club Burnley signing a five-year contract in a deal worth around £20 million. He made his league debut on 14 September 2025, against Liverpool, coming on as a substitute in the 89th minute of a 1–0 home defeat, decided by a stoppage-time penalty from Mohamed Salah in the 95th minute.

On 20 December 2025, Broja scored his first goal for Burnley against Bournemouth in the 90th minute, heading past Đorđe Petrović to secure a 1–1 draw. In January 2026, Broja was included in the Premier League "Team of the Week" following his assist against Newcastle United. In Burnley's 1–0 loss to Manchester City on 23 April 2026, Broja played briefly in the closing minutes and was congratulated by Pep Guardiola after the match, as Burnley were relegated to the Championship.

On 16 August 2026, Broja returned to competitive action after a lengthy absence, coming on as a 76th-minute substitute against West Ham United in Burnley's opening Championship match of the season, with the team trailing 2–0; his pass led to a penalty converted by Zian Flemming, who later scored the stoppage-time equaliser to complete Burnley's comeback.

== International career ==
Broja was eligible to play for England through his place of birth, and for Albania through his Albanian parents. In early 2019, he declined an invitation by the England national under-21 team as his desire was to play only for Albania.

Broja received his first call-up for the Albania U19 in early 2019, debuting in friendlies against North Macedonia, scoring twice, before adding three goals against Kosovo. Later that year, he played in the Euro 2020 qualifiers, scoring against Belgium and receiving a red card against Iceland.

On 9 June 2019, aged 17 years and 9 months, Broja debuted for the under-21 side against Wales, scoring twice in a 2–1 win, and scored again three days later in a 3–1 victory. He later played in the 2021 and 2023 UEFA Euro U21 qualification campaigns, and on 4 June 2021 captained the side and scored in a 3–0 away win against Andorra.

=== Senior ===
In September 2020, Broja received his first senior call-up from coach Edoardo Reja for Albania's 2020–21 UEFA Nations League C matches against Belarus and Lithuania. On 7 September 2020 he made his debut in a 1–0 home loss against Lithuania. In the following month, he started both of Albania's matches, which ended in goalless draws.

After his transfer to Southampton for the 2021–22 Premier League season, Broja opened his scoring account for the national team by netting in three consecutive matches during September–October 2021. On 5 September 2021, Broja scored his first senior goal in the 2022 World Cup qualification match against Hungary, helping his team to a 1–0 victory. It was Albania's first ever win against Hungary.

Three days later, in the next qualifying match against San Marino, Broja came on as a half-time substitute and contributed significantly by scoring once and providing two assists in a 5–0 victory. On 9 October 2021, Broja came on as a second-half substitute and scored the decisive goal in the 80th minute of a 1–0 victory over Hungary. Albania ultimately finished third in the group, two points behind Poland, and did not qualify for the play-offs.

On 10 June 2022, Broja scored from the penalty spot at the end of the first half in a 2022–23 UEFA Nations League B match against Israel, though Albania went on to lose 2–1 after conceding twice in the second half.

Broja missed the entire Euro 2024 qualifying campaign after suffering a serious injury while at Chelsea in December 2022, which sidelined him for 11 months and left him unavailable for coach Sylvinho. He recovered in time for the finals and was included in Albania's 26-man squad for the tournament in Germany. Ahead of the tournament, on 3 June 2024, Broja scored in the 31st minute of a 3–0 warm-up victory over Liechtenstein. During the finals in Euro 2024 Group B, he featured in Albania's defeats to Italy (1–2) and Spain (0–1). Albania finished bottom of the group with a single point and were eliminated from the tournament.

In August 2024, Broja suffered an Achilles tendon injury which sidelined him for the rest of the year, preventing him from featuring in the 2024–25 UEFA Nations League B. In his absence, Albania finished bottom of their group and were relegated to League C.

Broja returned to action in the 2026 World Cup qualifications, quickly establishing himself as a starter on the right wing and in March 2025, he provided an assist in a 3–0 win over Andorra.

== Career statistics ==
=== Club ===
As of match played 24 October 2026

Appearances and goals by club, season and competition
Club	Season	League			National cup (Note: Includes KNVB Cup, FA Cup)		League cup (Note: Includes EFL Cup)		Europe		Other		Total	
Club	Season	Division	Apps	Goals	Apps	Goals	Apps	Goals	Apps	Goals	Apps	Goals	Apps	Goals
Chelsea U23	2019–20	—			—		—		—		3 (Note: Appearances in EFL Trophy)	0	3	0
Chelsea	2019–20	Premier League	1	0	—		—		0	0	—		1	0
Chelsea	2022–23	Premier League	12	1	0	0	1	0	5 (Note: Appearances in UEFA Champions League)	0	—		18	1
Chelsea	2023–24	Premier League	13	1	2	1	4	0	—		—		19	2
Chelsea	Total		26	2	2	1	5	0	5	0	—		38	3
Vitesse (loan)	2020–21	Eredivisie	30	10	4	1	—		—		—		34	11
Southampton (loan)	2021–22	Premier League	32	6	4	1	2	2	—		—		38	9
Fulham (loan)	2023–24	Premier League	8	0	—		—		—		—		8	0
Everton (loan)	2024–25	Premier League	10	0	1	0	0	0	—		—		11	0
Burnley	2025–26	Premier League	24	1	0	0	2	0	—		—		26	1
Burnley	2026–27	Championship	9	0	0	0	1	0	—		—		10	0
Burnley	Total		33	1	0	0	3	0	—		—		36	1
Career total			140	19	11	3	10	2	5	0	3	0	168	24

=== International ===
As of match played 6 June 2026

Appearances and goals by national team and year
National team	Year	Apps	Goals
Albania	2020	3	0
Albania	2021	7	3
Albania	2022	7	1
Albania	2024	6	1
Albania	2025	10	1
Albania	2026	4	0
Total		37	6

Scores and results list Albania's goal tally first, score column indicates score after each Broja goal.

List of international goals scored by Armando Broja
No.	Date	Venue	Cap	Opponent	Score	Result	Competition
1	5 September 2021	Elbasan Arena, Elbasan, Albania	7	Hungary	1–0	1–0	2022 FIFA World Cup qualification
2	8 September 2021	Elbasan Arena, Elbasan, Albania	8	San Marino	3–0	5–0	2022 FIFA World Cup qualification
3	9 October 2021	Puskás Aréna, Budapest, Hungary	9	Hungary	1–0	1–0	2022 FIFA World Cup qualification
4	10 June 2022	Arena Kombëtare, Tirana, Albania	13	Israel	1–0	1–2	2022–23 UEFA Nations League B
5	3 June 2024	Haladás Sportkomplexum, Szombathely, Hungary	20	Liechtenstein	1–0	3–0	Friendly
6	14 October 2025	Arena Kombëtare, Tirana, Albania	31	Jordan	2–1	4–2	Friendly

== Honours ==
Chelsea U18

- Professional Development League: 2017–18

== See also ==
- List of Albania international footballers born outside Albania
