= Million Manhoef =

Dutch footballer (born 2002)

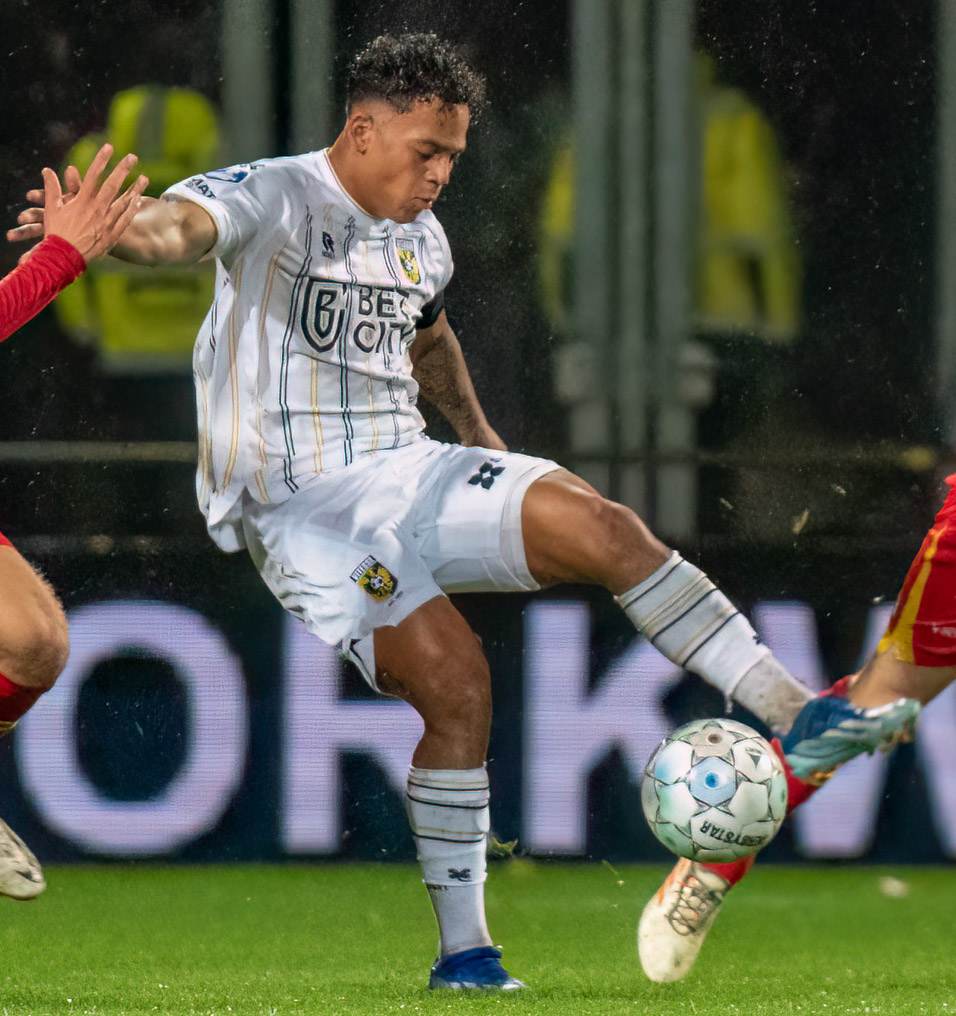
- Manhoef playing for Vitesse against Go Ahead Eagles in 2023

Personal information
- Full name: Million Eljoenai Levinio Manhoef
- Date of birth: 3 January 2002 (age 24)
- Place of birth: Beemster, Netherlands
- Height: 1.72 m (5 ft 8 in)
- Position: Winger

Team information
- Current team: Stoke City
- Number: 42

Youth career
- 2006–2010: VPV Purmersteijn
- 2010–2011: AVV Zeeburgia
- 2011–2016: Amsterdamsche FC
- 2016–2020: Vitesse

Senior career*
Years	Team	Apps	(Gls)
2020–2024	Vitesse	77	(15)
2024–	Stoke City	100	(16)

International career
2018	Netherlands U16	4	(1)
2019	Netherlands U17	4	(0)
2023–2025	Netherlands U21	12	(4)
- * Club domestic league appearances and goals as of 17:53, 7 November 2026 (UTC)

Million Eljoenai Levinio Manhoef (born 3 January 2002) is a Dutch professional footballer who plays as a winger for EFL Championship club Stoke City.

== Club career ==
=== Vitesse ===
Born in Beemster, Manhoef played youth football with VPV Purmersteijn, AVV Zeeburgia and Amsterdamsche FC before joining Vitesse at age 15. He joined the first team in the 2020–21, making his Eredivisie debut in a 2–1 defeat away at Ajax. He scored twice in 20 appearances in the 2021–22 as Vitesse reached the European play-offs but lost to AZ Alkmaar. During the 2022–23, Manhoef became one of Vitesse's key players, scoring nine goals in 34 appearances and earning the player-of-the-year award. In the 2023–24, Vitesse faced a financial crisis. With the team at the bottom of the league, Manhoef was linked with a move to England.

=== Stoke City ===
Manhoef joined English Championship club Stoke City on 1 February 2024 on a three-and-a-half-year contract for an undisclosed fee. He debuted on 10 February 2024 in a 3–1 defeat at Blackburn Rovers. As the team battled relegation towards the end of the 2023–24, Manhoef scored important goals against Plymouth Argyle and West Bromwich Albion. He also scored twice on the final day of the season in a 4–0 win against Bristol City, helping Stoke finish in 17th place. Manhoef was a regular in the 2024–25 season, making 38 appearances, scoring seven goals as Stoke avoided relegation on the final day.

Manhoef began the 2025–26 season well, scoring twice against Sheffield Wednesday in a 3–0 victory. Stoke were in play-off contention for the first half of the campaign but a poor second half saw the team drop down to table and finish in 17th, Manhoef scoring seven goals in 48 appearances.

== International career ==
Manhoef has represented the Netherlands at the youth level.

== Personal life ==
He is the son of retired Surinamese-born Dutch mixed martial artist and kickboxer fighter Melvin Manhoef. Manhoef initially followed in his father's footsteps by taking up kickboxing at a young age before focusing on football. Manhoef is of Surinamese and Indonesian descent.

== Career statistics ==
As of match played 7 November 2026

Appearances and goals by club, season and competition
Club	Season	League			National cup (Note: Includes FA Cup and KNVB Cup)		League cup (Note: Includes EFL Cup)		Other		Total	
Club	Season	Division	Apps	Goals	Apps	Goals	Apps	Goals	Apps	Goals	Apps	Goals
Vitesse	2020–21	Eredivisie	11	0	2	1	—		—		13	1
Vitesse	2021–22	Eredivisie	15	2	1	0	—		4 (Note: Appearances in UEFA Europa Conference League)	0	20	2
Vitesse	2022–23	Eredivisie	33	9	1	0	—		—		34	9
Vitesse	2023–24	Eredivisie	18	4	3	0	—		—		21	4
Vitesse	Total		77	15	7	1	—		4	0	88	16
Stoke City	2023–24	Championship	14	4	0	0	0	0	—		14	4
Stoke City	2024–25	Championship	34	5	0	0	4	2	—		38	7
Stoke City	2025–26	Championship	45	7	2	0	1	0	—		48	7
Stoke City	2026–27	Championship	7	0	0	0	2	0	—		9	0
Stoke City	Total		100	16	2	0	7	2	—		109	18
Career total			177	31	9	1	7	2	4	0	197	34

== Honours ==
Individual

- Eredivisie Team of the Month: May 2023
