= Idrissa Touré =

German footballer (born 1998)

Personal information
- Date of birth: 29 April 1998 (age 28)
- Place of birth: Berlin, Germany
- Height: 1.88 m (6 ft 2 in)
- Position: Midfielder

Team information
- Current team: Monza
- Number: 27

Youth career
- 2014–2015: Tennis Borussia Berlin
- 2015: RB Leipzig

Senior career*
Years	Team	Apps	(Gls)
2015–2017	RB Leipzig	1	(0)
2015–2017	RB Leipzig II	1	(0)
2017	Schalke 04 II	10	(0)
2017–2019	Werder Bremen II	35	(2)
2018–2019	→ Juventus U23 (loan)	34	(2)
2019–2021	Juventus	0	(0)
2019–2020	→ Juventus U23 (res.)	25	(1)
2020–2021	→ Vitesse (loan)	20	(1)
2021–2026	Pisa	145	(13)
2026–	Monza	0	(0)

International career
2015–2016	Germany U18	9	(0)
2016	Germany U19	3	(1)
- * Club domestic league appearances and goals as of 25 May 2026

Idrissa Touré (born 29 April 1998) is a German professional footballer who plays as a midfielder for Serie A club Monza. At international level, he represented Germany at under-18 and under-19 levels.

== Club career ==
=== Youth ===
Touré played for Tennis Borussia Berlin before moving to RB Leipzig in 2015.

=== RB Leipzig II ===
Touré extended his contract with RB Leipzig on 16 February 2016 until 2019. He made his debut for RB Leipzig in a 2–1 win against TSV 1860 München on 13 March 2016. In October 2016, he, together with teammate Vitaly Janelt, was ousted from the club's academy following an incident on a national team trip.

=== Schalke 04 II ===
In January 2017, he moved to FC Schalke 04 where he played for the reserve team.

=== Werder Bremen II ===
In summer 2017, Touré signed with Werder Bremen II. In his first season with the team he made 35 appearances scoring two goals and making two assists. In May 2018 his performances earned him his first professional contract.

=== Juventus U23 ===
In August 2018, Touré joined Juventus U23 on loan for the 2018–19 season. Juventus secured an option to sign him permanently. At the end of the season, Juventus decided to redeem the buying option and paid €1 million for the player.

On 3 September 2020, he joined Eredivisie club Vitesse on loan from Juventus.

=== Pisa ===
Touré joined Serie B club Pisa permanently in July 2021, having agreed a contract until 2025.

=== Monza ===
On 21 August 2026, Touré joined Serie A club Monza, having agreed on a contract until 2028.

== International career ==
Touré was the captain of Germany U18 national team, playing 9 times. For the U19 team, he made 3 appearances scoring 1 goal.

== Personal life ==
Touré was born in Berlin to Guinean parents and has four siblings.

== Career statistics ==
As of match played 7 November 2025

Appearances and goals by club, season and competition
Club	Season	League			National cup (Note: Includes DFB-Pokal, Coppa Italia Serie C, and KNVB Cup)		Other		Total	
Club	Season	Division	Apps	Goals	Apps	Goals	Apps	Goals	Apps	Goals
RB Leipzig	2015–16	2. Bundesliga	1	0	0	0	—		1	0
RB Leipzig II	2015–16	Regionalliga	1	0	—		—		1	0
Schalke 04 II	2016–17	Regionalliga	10	0	—		—		10	0
Werder Bremen II	2017–18	3. Liga	35	2	—		—		35	2
Juventus U23 (loan)	2018–19	Serie C	34	2	—		—		34	2
Juventus U23	2019–20	Serie C	25	1	2	0	2 (Note: Appearance(s) in Serie C promotion play-offs)	0	29	1
Vitesse (loan)	2020–21	Eredivisie	20	1	0	0	—		20	1
Pisa	2021–22	Serie B	32	3	1	0	1 (Note: Appearance(s) in Serie B promotion play-offs)	0	34	3
Pisa	2022–23	Serie B	29	3	1	0	—		30	3
Pisa	2023–24	Serie B	19	0	1	0	—		20	0
Pisa	2024–25	Serie B	33	6	2	0	—		35	6
Pisa	2025–26	Serie A	9	1	2	0	—		11	1
Pisa	Total		122	13	7	0	1	0	130	13
Career total			248	19	9	0	3	0	260	19

== Honours ==
Juventus U23

- Coppa Italia Serie C: 2019–20
