= Riechedly Bazoer =

Curaçaoan footballer (born 1996)

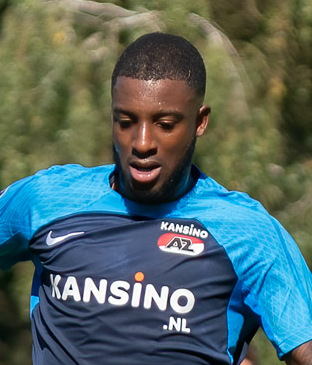
- Bazoer playing for AZ in 2023

Personal information
- Full name: Riechedly Guillermo Bazoer
- Date of birth: 12 October 1996 (age 30)
- Place of birth: Utrecht, Netherlands
- Height: 1.84 m (6 ft 0 in)
- Positions: Centre-back; defensive midfielder

Youth career
- 2005–2006: USV Elinkwijk
- 2006–2012: PSV
- 2012–2013: Ajax

Senior career*
Years	Team	Apps	(Gls)
2013–2017	Ajax	51	(6)
2013–2014	→ Jong Ajax	34	(1)
2017–2019	VfL Wolfsburg	25	(0)
2018	→ Porto B (loan)	2	(0)
2018–2019	Porto	0	(0)
2019	→ Utrecht (loan)	12	(3)
2019–2022	Vitesse	77	(9)
2022–2024	AZ	47	(0)
2024–2026	Konyaspor	40	(2)

International career^{‡}
2011	Netherlands U15	2	(0)
2011–2012	Netherlands U16	4	(0)
2012	Netherlands U17	13	(1)
2013–2015	Netherlands U19	10	(1)
2015–2017	Netherlands U21	7	(2)
2015–2016	Netherlands	6	(0)
2025–	Curaçao	6	(0)
- * Club domestic league appearances and goals as of 21:16, 17 May 2026 (UTC) ‡ National team caps and goals as of 14 June 2026

Riechedly Guillermo Bazoer (born 12 October 1996) is a professional footballer who plays as a centre-back or defensive midfielder. Born in the Netherlands, he represents the Curaçao national team.

== Club career ==
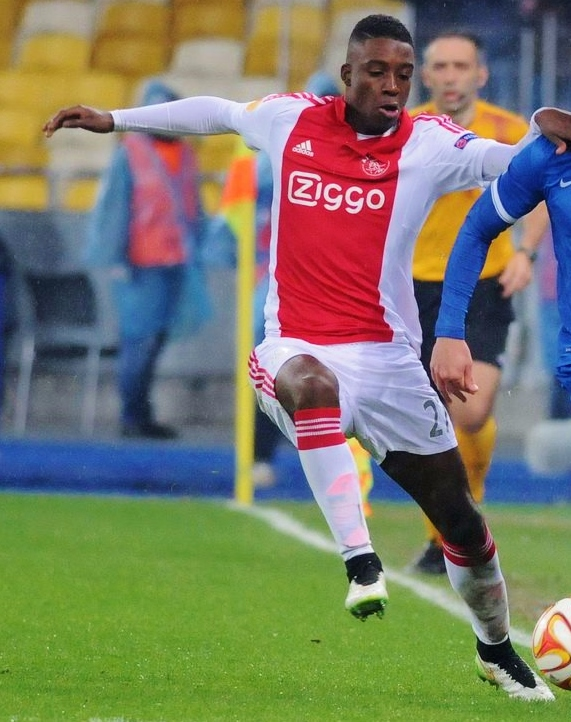
Bazoer playing for Ajax

=== Ajax ===
Bazoer joined Ajax on a free from rival Eredivisie club PSV on 16 November 2012. He had been linked with a move to the Premier League with Arsenal, Chelsea, Manchester City and Newcastle United being mentioned, but opted to sign with Ajax instead. No transfer fee was necessary, as the young defender was under age. However it was declared by the KNVB that Bazoer would not be eligible for the first team of Ajax until after his 16th birthday. Unable to make his debut in the 2012–13 season for the first team due to the KNVB ruling, he played for Jong Ajax in the Beloften Eredivisie, as well as participating in the 2013 Copa Amsterdam with Ajax A1.

On 29 June 2013, he made his debut for Ajax during a pre-season friendly against SDC Putten. Bazoer came on as a second-half substitute, with the match ending in a 4–1 win in favour of Ajax. Bazoer made his professional debut in the Eerste Divisie for Jong Ajax, in the team's season opener against Telstar on 5 August 2013, a match they won 2–0 in the team's first ever match in the second division of Dutch football. On 4 September 2013 it was announced that Bazoer was amongst the 22 players who were registered by Frank de Boer for Ajax's 2013–14 UEFA Champions League campaign. On 15 February 2015, Bazoer scored his first goal for Ajax in a 4–2 win over FC Twente. On 19 February 2015, Bazoer made his full European debut in a 1–0 win over Legia Warsaw in the Europa League.

=== VfL Wolfsburg ===
On 14 December 2016, VfL Wolfsburg announced that Bazoer had signed a contract with the Lower Saxony club through 30 June 2021. The transfer went through in the following Winter Transfer period. The reported transfer fee was 12 million euro. He made his VfL Wolfsburg debut in the Bundesliga game versus TSG Hoffenheim on 12 February 2017.

==== Porto (loan) ====
On 31 August 2018, Bazoer was loaned to Primeira Liga side Porto on one-year loan. Bazoer did not feature in any league games for Porto due to injuries and lack of discipline which made him play with B team.

==== Utrecht (loan) ====
On 7 January 2019, he joined Utrecht on loan until the end of the season.

=== Vitesse ===
On 12 July 2019, he joined Vitesse on a permanent transfer from VfL Wolfsburg for an undisclosed amount. He signed a three-year deal. Bazoer made his debut for Vitesse on 3 August 2019 against former club Ajax. In the match, he scored a goal to put Vitesse ahead 2–1 before being sent off for two yellow cards as they were held to a 2–2 draw. On 24 October 2019, Bazoer was left out of the Vitesse squad until further notice due to his attitude.

Under head coach Thomas Letsch, Bazoer would grow into a key player. The German manager of Vitesse positioned Bazoer in the position of centre-back, after advice by assistant coach Joseph Oosting. As Vitesse finished 4th in the league table in the 2020–21 season, Bazoer was voted "Player of the Season" by Dutch football magazine Voetbal International.

=== AZ Alkmaar ===
On 1 August 2022, Bazoer joined AZ on a free transfer, signing a three-year contract.

=== Konyaspor ===
On 11 September 2024, Bazoer signed a two-year contract with Konyaspor in Turkey.

== International career ==
=== Youth ===
Bazoer has represented the Netherlands at various youth levels. He participated in the 2012 UEFA European Under-17 Championship, helping to contribute to the Netherlands' second consecutive continental title in that age group by defeating Germany 5–4 on penalties in the final, after extra time following a 1–1 deadlock.

On 4 January 2013, the Curaçao Football Federation expressed an interest in calling up Bazoer to represent the Curaçao U-20 team for the 2013 CONCACAF U-20 Championship in Mexico. Bazoer was eligible due to his age and heritage, and this would not have conflicted with his decision to play for the Netherlands given the player's age but the offer was turned down by his agents, and Bazoer remained in Amsterdam.

=== Senior ===
==== Netherlands ====
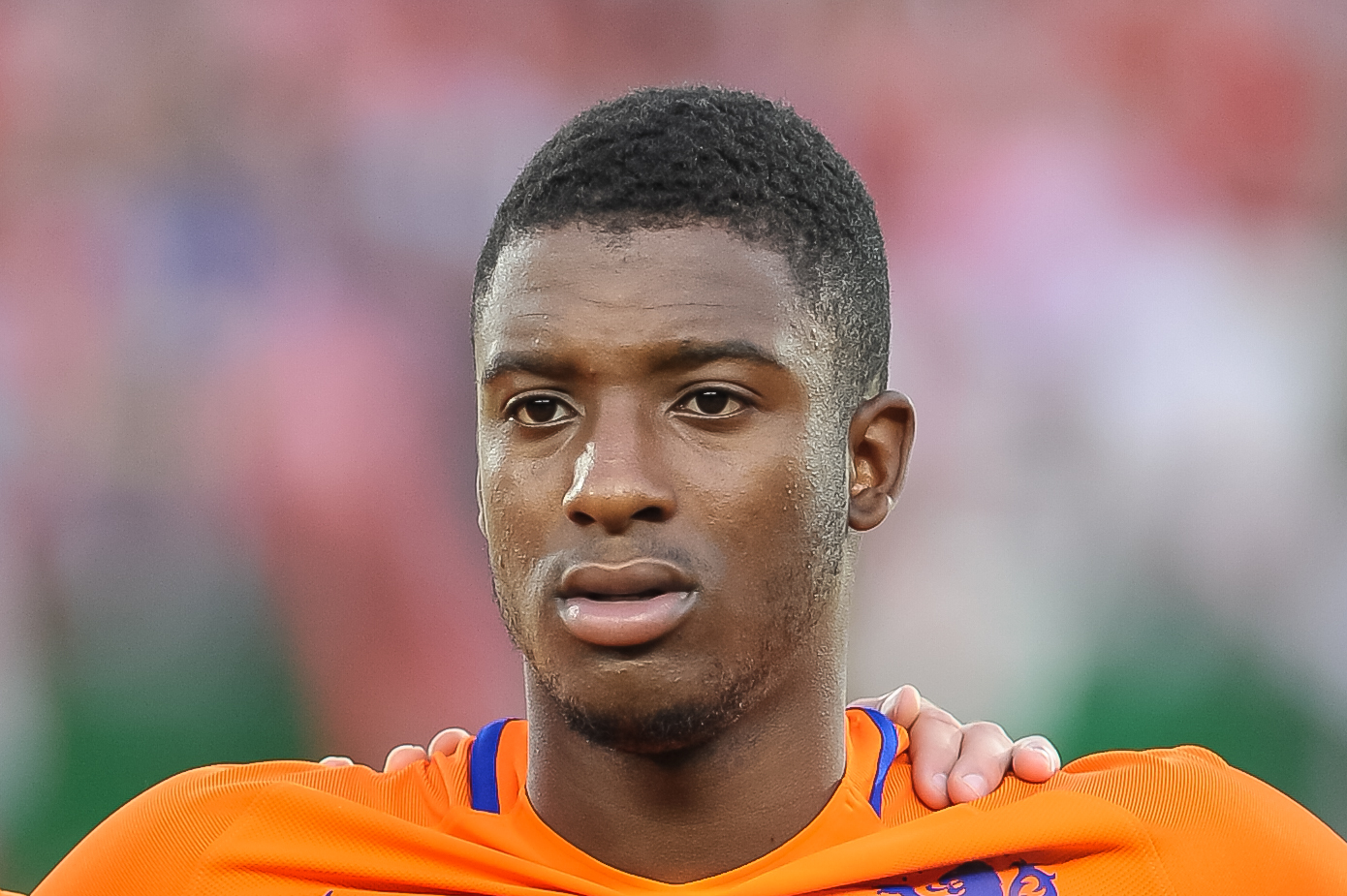
Bazoer with the Netherlands in 2016

Bazoer received his first call up to the senior Netherlands team in October 2015 to replace the injured Davy Klaassen, and again on 6 November 2015 for friendlies against Wales and Germany. He made his senior debut as a late substitute against Wales on 13 November 2015. He was called up to the preliminary squad for the Curaçao national team for the 2021 CONCACAF Gold Cup.

On 29 August 2025, Bazoer's request to change sports citizenship from Dutch to Curaçaoan was approved by FIFA.

==== Curaçao ====
Bazoer made his senior Curaçao debut on 5 September 2025 in a 2026 World Cup qualifier match against Trinidad and Tobago ending a 0–0 draw.

On 18 May 2026, he was named by head coach Dick Advocaat in the 26-man squad for the 2026 FIFA World Cup, marking the country's first-ever appearance at the tournament.

== Career statistics ==
As of match played 17 May 2026

Appearances and goals by club, season and competition
Club	Season	League			National cup		Continental		Other		Total	
Club	Season	Division	Apps	Goals	Apps	Goals	Apps	Goals	Apps	Goals	Apps	Goals
Jong Ajax	2013–14	Eerste Divisie	21	0	—		—		—		21	0
Jong Ajax	2014–15	Eerste Divisie	13	1	—		—		—		13	1
Jong Ajax	Total		34	1	—		—		—		34	1
Ajax	2014–15	Eredivisie	17	1	1	0	4 (Note: Appearances in UEFA Europa League)	1	0	0	22	2
Ajax	2015–16	Eredivisie	29	5	2	0	8 (Note: Two appearances in UEFA Champions League, six appearances in UEFA Europa League)	0	—		39	5
Ajax	2016–17	Eredivisie	5	0	2	1	3 (Note: Two appearances in UEFA Champions League, one appearance in UEFA Europa League)	0	—		10	1
Ajax	Total		51	6	5	1	15	1	0	0	71	8
Wolfsburg	2016–17	Bundesliga	12	0	1	0	—		0	0	13	0
Wolfsburg	2017–18	Bundesliga	13	0	1	0	—		0	0	14	0
Wolfsburg	Total		25	0	2	0	—		0	0	27	0
Porto B (loan)	2018–19	LigaPro	2	0	—		—		—		2	0
Porto (loan)	2018–19	Primeira Liga	0	0	1	0	1 (Note: Appearance in UEFA Champions League)	0	1 (Note: Appearance in Taça da Liga)	1	3	1
Utrecht (loan)	2018–19	Eredivisie	12	3	0	0	—		2 (Note: Appearances in 2019 Eredivisie European play-offs)	0	14	3
Vitesse	2019–20	Eredivisie	22	3	3	0	—		—		25	3
Vitesse	2020–21	Eredivisie	29	5	5	0	—		—		34	5
Vitesse	2021–22	Eredivisie	26	1	3	0	12 (Note: Appearances in UEFA Europa Conference League)	0	4 (Note: Appearances in 2022 Eredivisie European play-offs)	1	45	2
Vitesse	Total		77	9	11	0	12	0	4	1	104	10
AZ	2022–23	Eredivisie	16	0	1	0	8	0	—		25	0
AZ	2023–24	Eredivisie	30	0	3	0	9	0	—		42	0
AZ	2024–25	Eredivisie	1	0	0	0	0	0	—		1	0
AZ	Total		47	0	4	0	17	0	—		68	0
Konyaspor	2024–25	Süper Lig	25	2	3	0	—		—		28	2
Konyaspor	2025–26	Süper Lig	15	0	2	0	—		—		17	0
Konyaspor	Total		40	2	5	0	—		—		45	2
Career total			288	21	28	1	45	1	7	2	368	25

=== International ===
As of match played 14 June 2026

Appearances and goals by national team and year
National team	Year	Apps	Goals
Netherlands	2015	1	0
Netherlands	2016	5	0
Netherlands	Total	6	0
Curaçao	2025	2	0
Curaçao	2026	4	0
Curaçao	Total	6	0
Career total		12	0

== Honours ==
Netherlands U17

- UEFA European Under-17 Championship: 2012

Individual

- Ajax Talent of the Year: 2016.
- Eredivisie Team of the Month: November 2021, September 2023.
- Voetbal International Player of the Season, 2020–21 season.
