= Jacob Rasmussen =

Danish footballer (born 1997)

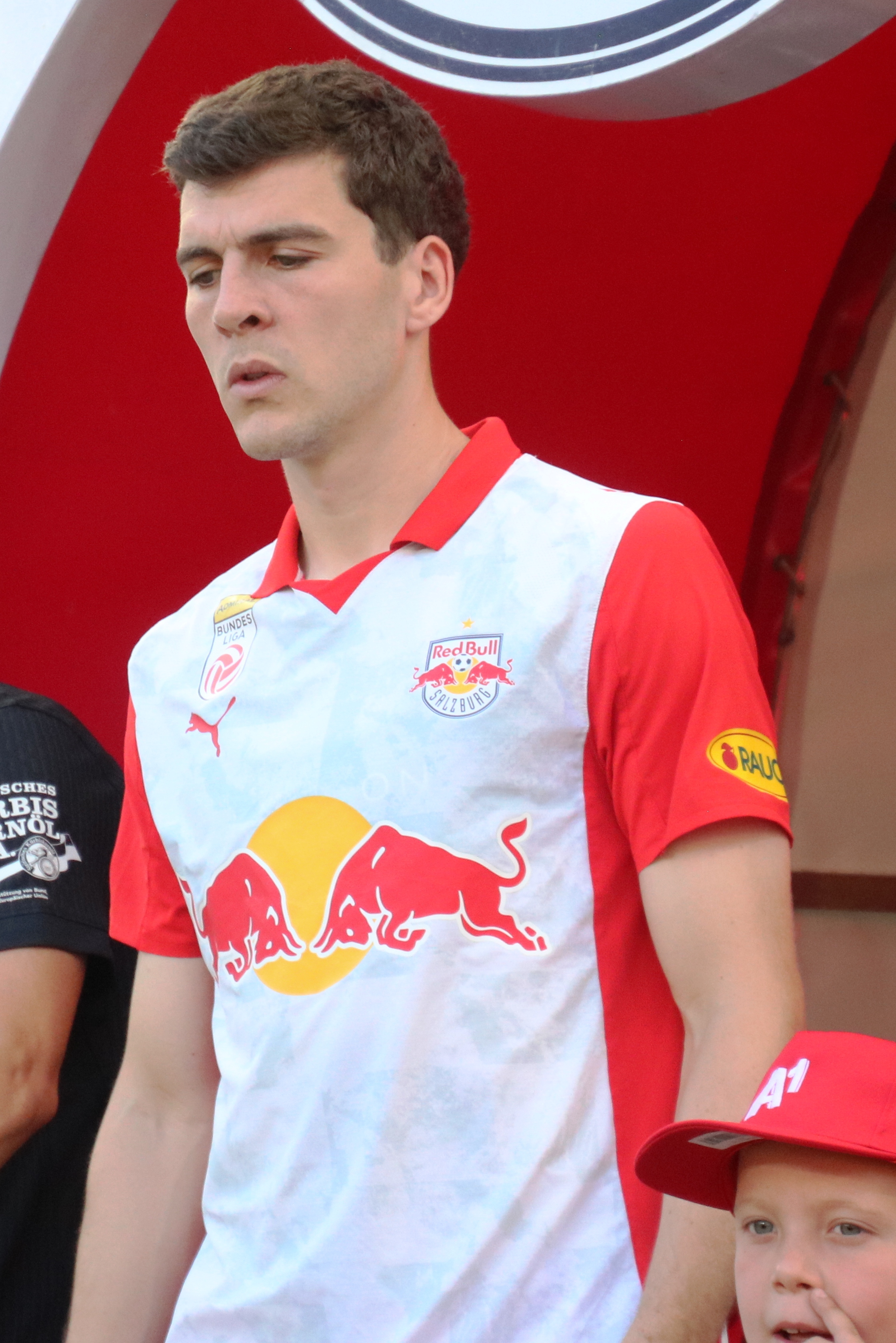
- Rasmussen with Red Bull Salzburg in 2025

Personal information
- Full name: Jacob Vandsø Ryfeldt Rasmussen
- Date of birth: 28 May 1997 (age 29)
- Place of birth: Odense, Denmark
- Height: 1.93 m (6 ft 4 in)
- Position: Centre-back

Team information
- Current team: 1. FC Kaiserslautern
- Number: 14

Youth career
- 2002–2013: Næsby
- 2013–2014: OB
- 2014–2016: Schalke 04
- 2016–2017: FC St. Pauli

Senior career*
| Years | Team | Apps | (Gls) |
| 2016–2017 | FC St. Pauli II | 17 | (1) |
| 2017–2018 | Rosenborg | 20 | (0) |
| 2018–2019 | Empoli | 10 | (0) |
| 2019–2023 | Fiorentina | 0 | (0) |
| 2019 | → Empoli (loan) | 4 | (0) |
| 2020 | → Erzgebirge Aue (loan) | 14 | (0) |
| 2020–2022 | → Vitesse (loan) | 55 | (2) |
| 2022–2023 | → Feyenoord (loan) | 10 | (1) |
| 2023–2025 | Brøndby | 57 | (1) |
| 2025–2026 | Red Bull Salzburg | 16 | (0) |
| 2026– | 1. FC Kaiserslautern | 18 | (1) |

International career
| 2012–2013 | Denmark U16 | 9 | (0) |
| 2013–2014 | Denmark U17 | 11 | (0) |
| 2014 | Denmark U18 | 1 | (0) |
| 2015–2016 | Denmark U19 | 10 | (1) |
| 2016–2017 | Denmark U20 | 4 | (0) |
| 2017–2019 | Denmark U21 | 17 | (0) |
- * Club domestic league appearances and goals as of 10:07, 14 October 2026 (UTC)

Jacob Vandsø Ryfeldt Rasmussen (born 28 May 1997) is a Danish professional footballer who plays as a centre-back for German 2. Bundesliga club 1. FC Kaiserslautern.

== Club career ==
=== Early career ===
Born in Odense, Rasmussen began his youth career at age five for Næsby Boldklub before moving to the youth academy of Superliga club Odense Boldklub (OB) in 2013. He signed with the Schalke 04 academy in September 2014.

=== FC St. Pauli II ===
After spending two seasons in the academy he signed for FC St. Pauli in June 2016. He became part of the reserve team, competing in Regionalliga. On 31 July he made his debut for the side, starting in the 3–1 win over 1. FC Germania Egestorf/Langreder. In the return game against Egestorf/Langreder on 26 November, he scored his first goal for the team and thereby contributed to the 3–3 away draw.

He was part of the first-team squad twice, but only sat on the bench for matches against SV Sandhausen and VfL Bochum.

=== Rosenborg ===
On 6 January 2017, Rasmussen signed for Eliteserien club Rosenborg. He made his debut 29 March 2017 starting against Brann in the 2017 Mesterfinalen. On 5 April he made his debut in Eliteserien, starting in the 3–0 victory at Sandefjord.

=== Empoli ===
On 5 July 2018, Empoli announced that they had signed Rasmussen on a four-year contract. He made his debut on 12 August in the Coppa Italia tie against Cittadella, which was lost 3–0. Seven days later he also made his debut in Serie A, in the 2–0 win over Cagliari.

=== Fiorentina ===
On 31 January 2019, Rasmussen joined Fiorentina. He was sent directly to his former club Empoli on loan for the remainder of the 2018–19 season.

==== Erzgebirge Aue (loan) ====
On 12 January 2020, he joined 2. Bundesliga club Erzgebirge Aue on loan for the rest of the 2019–20 season. He made his debut on 31 January in a 0–0 draw against league leaders Arminia Bielefeld.

==== Vitesse (loan) ====
On 21 July 2020, Rasmussen was loaned to Dutch Eredivisie club Vitesse for the 2020–21 season, with the option of extending the loan for another season. During the season, Vitesse reached the final of the KNVB Cup, but lost 2–1 to Ajax. Rasmussen was sent off in the cup final. A month later, the option in his loan deal was triggered, and his deal was extended by another season.

On 4 November 2021, Rasmussen scored a goal and an own goal in the span of four minutes in the UEFA Europa Conference League match against Tottenham Hotspur, coached by Antonio Conte in his debut as manager of the club. The match ended in a 3–2 loss for the Dutch side.

==== Feyenoord (loan) ====
On 30 July 2022, Rasmussen returned to the Netherlands and joined Feyenoord on a season-long loan with an option to buy. He made his competitive debut for the club on the first matchday of the 2022–23 season, starting at centre-back against his former club Vitesse in a 5–2 victory. On 27 August, he scored his first goal for the club, slotting home the third goal in the club's 4–0 win over FC Emmen.

=== Brøndby ===
On 14 July 2023, it was announced that Fiorentina and Brøndby had reached an agreement for the transfer of Rasmussen for an undisclosed fee, reported to be €3 million. He signed a four-year contract, and was assigned the number 4 shirt. He made his debut for the club on 6 August, starting in a 3–1 league loss to Nordsjælland. On 3 September, he scored his first goal for Brøndby, easily tapping the ball in from close range to kickstart a 3–1 victory over Randers.

On 13 September 2024, Rasmussen was named as Kevin Mensah's replacement as club captain.

=== Red Bull Salzburg ===
On 9 June 2025, Rasmussen joined Austrian Bundesliga club Red Bull Salzburg from Brøndby, signing a two-year contract. He described himself as "hungry for success and titles" and stated that he aimed to "deliver from day one," as he was reunited with his manager at Vitesse, Thomas Letsch. Assigned the number 2 shirt, he made his competitive debut nine days later in a 2–1 victory over Pachuca at the FIFA Club World Cup, a match played at TQL Stadium in Cincinnati which was delayed for more than an hour due to a thunderstorm. He started all three of Salzburg's group-stage matches, although the club did not progress beyond the first round.

Rasmussen made his league debut on 2 August in a 2–2 draw away to newly promoted SV Ried on the opening day of the 2025–26 season. Ten days later he scored his first goal for Salzburg, heading his side into the lead in a 3–2 home defeat to Club Brugge in the UEFA Champions League third qualifying round. Local media noted a misplaced pass from Rasmussen in the build-up to Brugge's equaliser, as Salzburg were eliminated 4–2 on aggregate.

=== Kaiserslautern ===
On 30 January 2026, Rasmussen signed with 1. FC Kaiserslautern in German 2. Bundesliga.

== Career statistics ==
As of match played 9 October 2026

Appearances and goals by club, season and competition
| Club | Season | League | | | National cup (Note: Includes Norwegian Football Cup, Coppa Italia, KNVB Cup, Danish Cup, Austrian Cup, DFB-Pokal) | | Europe | | Other (Note: Includes Mesterfinalen) | | Total | |
| Club | Season | Division | Apps | Goals | Apps | Goals | Apps | Goals | Apps | Goals | Apps | Goals |
|---|---|---|---|---|---|---|---|---|---|---|---|---|
| FC St. Pauli II | 2016–17 | Regionalliga Nord | 17 | 1 | — | | — | | — | | 17 | 1 |
| Rosenborg | 2017 | Eliteserien | 10 | 0 | 2 | 0 | 5 (Note: Appearances in UEFA Europa League) | 0 | 1 | 0 | 18 | 0 |
| Rosenborg | 2018 | Eliteserien | 10 | 0 | 4 | 0 | 0 | 0 | 1 | 0 | 15 | 0 |
| Rosenborg | Total | | 20 | 0 | 6 | 0 | 5 | 0 | 2 | 0 | 33 | 0 |
| Empoli | 2018–19 | Serie A | 14 | 0 | 1 | 0 | — | | — | | 15 | 0 |
| Erzgebirge Aue (loan) | 2019–20 | 2. Bundesliga | 14 | 0 | 0 | 0 | — | | — | | 14 | 0 |
| Vitesse (loan) | 2020–21 | Eredivisie | 28 | 2 | 5 | 0 | — | | — | | 33 | 2 |
| Vitesse (loan) | 2021–22 | Eredivisie | 27 | 0 | 2 | 0 | 10 (Note: Appearances in UEFA Conference League) | 1 | 0 | 0 | 39 | 1 |
| Vitesse (loan) | Total | | 55 | 2 | 7 | 0 | 10 | 1 | 0 | 0 | 72 | 3 |
| Feyenoord (loan) | 2022–23 | Eredivisie | 10 | 1 | 1 | 0 | 1 | 0 | — | | 12 | 1 |
| Brøndby | 2023–24 | Danish Superliga | 29 | 1 | 4 | 0 | — | | — | | 33 | 1 |
| Brøndby | 2024–25 | Danish Superliga | 28 | 0 | 6 | 0 | 3 | 0 | — | | 39 | 0 |
| Brøndby | Total | | 57 | 1 | 10 | 0 | 3 | 0 | — | | 70 | 1 |
| Red Bull Salzburg | 2024–25 | Austrian Bundesliga | — | | — | | — | | 3 (Note: Appearances in FIFA Club World Cup) | 0 | 3 | 0 |
| Red Bull Salzburg | 2025–26 | Austrian Bundesliga | 16 | 0 | 3 | 0 | 10 (Note: Four appearances and one goal in UEFA Champions League, six appearances in UEFA Europa League) | 1 | — | | 29 | 1 |
| Red Bull Salzburg | Total | | 16 | 0 | 3 | 0 | 10 | 1 | 3 | 0 | 32 | 1 |
| 1. FC Kaiserslautern | 2025–26 | 2. Bundesliga | 12 | 1 | 0 | 0 | — | | — | | 12 | 1 |
| 1. FC Kaiserslautern | 2026–27 | 2. Bundesliga | 6 | 0 | 1 | 0 | — | | — | | 7 | 0 |
| 1. FC Kaiserslautern | Total | | 18 | 1 | 1 | 0 | — | | — | | 19 | 1 |
| Career total | | | 221 | 6 | 29 | 0 | 29 | 2 | 5 | 0 | 284 | 8 |

== Honours ==
Rosenborg

- Eliteserien: 2017, 2018
- Mesterfinalen: 2017, 2018

Feyenoord

- Eredivisie: 2022–23

Individual

- Superliga Team of the Month: September 2023, October 2023
