= Sondre Tronstad =

Norwegian footballer (born 1995)

Personal information
- Full name: Sondre Bjorvand Tronstad
- Date of birth: 26 August 1995 (age 31)
- Place of birth: Kristiansand, Norway
- Height: 1.74 m (5 ft 9 in)
- Position: Midfielder

Team information
- Current team: Brann
- Number: 8

Youth career
- Tveit
- –2012: Start

Senior career*
Years	Team	Apps	(Gls)
2012–2013	Start	21	(1)
2014–2016	Huddersfield Town	0	(0)
2016–2020	Haugesund	110	(4)
2020–2023	Vitesse	89	(7)
2023–2026	Blackburn Rovers	103	(2)
2026–	Brann	0	(0)

International career^{‡}
2011	Norway U16	2	(0)
2012	Norway U17	12	(0)
2013	Norway U18	6	(0)
2020	Norway	1	(0)
- * Club domestic league appearances and goals as of 24 February 2026 (UTC) ‡ National team caps and goals as of 18 November 2020

Sondre Bjorvand Tronstad (born 26 August 1995) is a Norwegian professional footballer who plays for Eliteserien side Brann as a midfielder. He previously played for Start and Haugesund in Norway and for Dutch club SBV Vitesse. Tronstad has represented his country both at youth and senior level.

== Club career ==
=== Early career ===
Tronstad played for Tveit IL before he joined Start. In November 2009, he was on a trial with Manchester United together with his countrymen Herman Stengel and Mats Møller Dæhli.

=== IK Start ===
Tronstad made his first-team debut for Start in the First Division in 2012, and made his debut in Tippeligaen the following season. He has been compared to the former Start-player and Norway international, Fredrik Strømstad.

=== Huddersfield Town ===
On 21 January 2014, Sondre joined Huddersfield Town on a 2 1/2-year deal.

=== FK Haugesund ===
On 14 January 2016, after leaving Huddersfield, Tronstad signed for a Norwegian side FK Haugesund on a 3-year deal.

=== Vitesse ===
On 24 January 2020, Tronstad joined Vitesse on a 3 1/2-year deal. On 1 February 2020 he made his Eredivisie debut against ADO Den Haag as a 75th minute substitute for Navarone Foor. On 18 April 2021 he played the whole match against AFC Ajax in the KNVB Cup final, which Vitesse lost 2–1.

=== Blackburn Rovers ===
On 15 June 2023, it was announced that Tronstad would join Blackburn Rovers upon the expiration of his contract, signing a three-year deal. He made his Championship debut on 5 August, starting in a 2–1 home win over West Bromwich Albion. On 7 December 2024, in the absence of Lewis Travis, Tronstad was named captain for the match against Hull City by manager John Eustace. On 18 April 2025, Tronstad scored his first league goals for the club, netting a brace in a 4–1 home victory over Millwall. On 26 April 2025, Tronstad was named player of the year, winning 31% of the supporters' vote, becoming the first Norwegian player to win the award.

On 29 December 2025, Tronstad made his 100th appearance for the club in a 0–0 draw away to Sheffield Wednesday.

On 24 February 2026, Tronstad was substituted at half-time during a 2–1 defeat to Bristol City after suffering a knock. He did not feature in the following match away to Derby County. On 4 March 2026, the club confirmed that Tronstad would miss the remainder of the 2025–26 season after undergoing a full ACL reconstruction.

On 19 May, Blackburn Rovers confirmed that Tronstad would depart the club upon the expiration of his contract. In an interview with the Lancashire Telegraph, Tronstad revealed that his wife had been struggling with homesickness and, with the couple raising a young daughter was a main factor in returning to Norway.

=== SK Brann ===
On 12 August 2026, Tronstad returned to Norway, joining Eliteserien club SK Brann on a contract until 2028.

== International career ==
Tronstad has played for Norwegian youth teams from under-16 to under-18 level. On 18 November 2020 he made his debut for the senior team against Austria in the Nations League.

== Career statistics ==
=== Club ===
As of match played 24 February 2026

Appearances and goals by club, season and competition
Club	Season	League			National cup (Note: Includes KNVB Cup, Norwegian Football Cup, FA Cup)		League cup (Note: Includes EFL Cup)		Continental		Total	
Club	Season	Division	Apps	Goals	Apps	Goals	Apps	Goals	Apps	Goals	Apps	Goals
Start	2012	Adeccoligaen	12	0	4	0	—		—		16	0
Start	2013	Tippeligaen	9	1	1	0	—		—		10	1
Start	Total		21	1	5	0	—		—		26	1
Haugesund	2016	Tippeligaen	23	2	3	0	—		—		26	2
Haugesund	2017	Eliteserien	29	0	4	0	—		4 (Note: Appearances in UEFA Europa League)	1	37	1
Haugesund	2018	Eliteserien	29	1	4	0	—		—		33	1
Haugesund	2019	Eliteserien	29	1	5	1	—		6	0	40	2
Haugesund	Total		110	4	16	1	—		10	1	136	6
Vitesse	2019–20	Eredivisie	6	0	1	0	—		—		7	0
Vitesse	2020–21	Eredivisie	23	2	3	0	—		—		26	2
Vitesse	2021–22	Eredivisie	36	4	0	0	—		14 (Note: Appearances in UEFA Europa Conference League)	1	50	5
Vitesse	2022–23	Eredivisie	28	2	0	0	—		0	0	28	2
Vitesse	Total		93	8	4	0	—		14	1	111	9
Blackburn Rovers	2023–24	Championship	36	0	2	1	3	0	0	0	41	1
Blackburn Rovers	2024–25	Championship	38	2	1	0	1	0	0	0	40	2
Blackburn Rovers	2025–26	Championship	29	0	0	0	1	0	—		30	0
Blackburn Rovers	Total		103	2	3	1	5	0	—		111	3
Brann	2026	Eliteserien	0	0	0	0	—		—		0	0
Career total			327	15	28	2	5	0	24	2	384	19

=== International ===
As of match played 18 November 2020

Appearances and goals by national team and year
National team	Year	Apps	Goals
Norway	2020	1	0
Total		1	0
