= Patrick Vroegh =

Dutch footballer (born 1999)

Personal information
- Date of birth: 29 November 1999 (age 26)
- Place of birth: Herwijnen, Netherlands
- Height: 1.75 m (5 ft 9 in)
- Position: Midfielder

Team information
- Current team: Sparta Nijkerk
- Number: 8

Youth career
- –2015: Willem II
- 2015–2018: Vitesse

Senior career*
Years	Team	Apps	(Gls)
2016–2019	Jong Vitesse	36	(1)
2019–2022	Vitesse	45	(2)
2022–2025	RKC Waalwijk	23	(0)
2025–	Sparta Nijkerk	13	(3)
- * Club domestic league appearances and goals as of 29 November 2025

Patrick Vroegh (born 29 November 1999) is a Dutch professional footballer who plays as a midfielder for Derde Divisie club Sparta Nijkerk.

== Club career ==
Vroegh made his Eredivisie debut for Vitesse on 19 October 2019 in a game against VVV.

In the summer of 2022, Vroegh signed a three-year contract with RKC Waalwijk.
