= Danilho Doekhi =

Dutch footballer (born 1998)

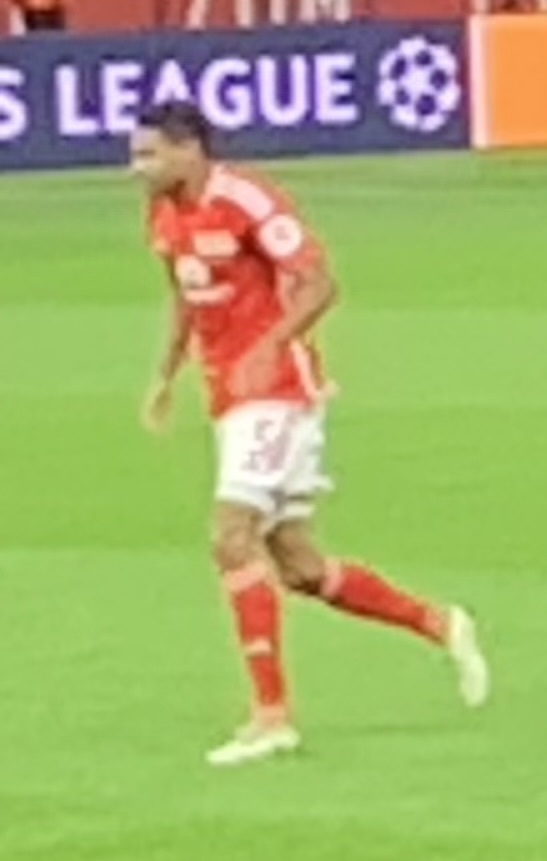
- Doekhi with Union Berlin in 2023

Personal information
- Full name: Danilho Raimundo Doekhi
- Date of birth: 30 June 1998 (age 28)
- Place of birth: Rotterdam, Netherlands
- Height: 1.90 m (6 ft 3 in)
- Position: Centre-back

Team information
- Current team: Lazio
- Number: 5

Youth career
- 2004–2006: Xerxes
- 2006–2016: Excelsior

Senior career*
| Years | Team | Apps | (Gls) |
| 2016 | Excelsior | 19 | (1) |
| 2016–2018 | Jong Ajax | 48 | (2) |
| 2018 | Jong Vitesse | 10 | (0) |
| 2018–2022 | Vitesse | 111 | (4) |
| 2022–2026 | Union Berlin | 117 | (13) |
| 2026– | Lazio | 4 | (0) |

International career^{‡}
| 2015 | Netherlands U18 | 6 | (0) |
| 2016 | Netherlands U19 | 1 | (0) |
| 2018 | Netherlands U20 | 2 | (0) |
| 2019–2020 | Netherlands U21 | 4 | (0) |
- * Club domestic league appearances and goals as of 11 October 2026 ‡ National team caps and goals as of 20 January 2021

Danilho Raimundo Doekhi (born 30 June 1998) is a Dutch professional footballer who plays as a centre-back for Serie A club Lazio.

== Club career ==
Doekhi was transferred to the AFC Ajax youth program in July 2016, but is a product of the Excelsior youth system. He made his Eredivisie debut with the latter on 6 March 2016 in a game against AZ. He replaced Stanley Elbers in the 81st minute, in a 2–0 away loss.

Doekhi made his Eerste Divisie-debut for Jong Ajax on 17 February 2017, coming on as an injury-time substitute for Léon Bergsma in the 95th minute against Achilles '29, with the game ending in a 3–2 away win.

Doekhi's first league start for Jong Ajax came in the first game of the new season, a 2–1 away win against SC Cambuur. It was followed up with two further starts against Fortuna Sittard and Jong PSV, before alternating between the bench and the starting line-up for much of September and October. After coming on as a sub against Go Ahead Eagles, Doekhi then entered a period of consistent starts for Jong Ajax, making 16 out of a possible 17 appearances in the starting line-up, lasting the full 90 minutes in 14 of them.

On 4 July 2018, Doekhi agreed to join fellow Eredivisie side, Vitesse on a four-year deal. On 12 January 2021, he netted his first goal for the club in a 1–0 victory over FC Utrecht.

On 16 May 2022, Doekhi signed with German club Union Berlin. Later that year, on 30 October, he scored his first goal in a 2–1 Bundesliga victory over Borussia Mönchengladbach. On 20 September 2023, he made his UEFA Champions League debut in a 1–0 away defeat against Real Madrid.

On 14 July 2026, Doekhi signed a three-year contract with Lazio in Italy.

== International career ==
Doekhi represented the Netherlands at youth international level. He later initiated a change of international allegiance to Suriname, but the Surinamese Football Association's application in October 2024 was rejected by FIFA, prompting an appeal to the Court of Arbitration for Sport.

== Personal life ==
Born during the 1998 FIFA World Cup match between Argentina and England, his parents named him Raimundo after Brazilian International footballer Raimundo Souza Vieira de Oliveira. He is the nephew of former Dutch international football player Winston Bogarde and is of mixed Dutch and Surinamese descent.

== Career statistics ==
As of match played 11 October 2026

Appearances and goals by club, season and competition
| Club | Season | League | | | National cup (Note: Includes KNVB Cup, DFB-Pokal, Coppa Italia) | | Europe | | Other | | Total | |
| Club | Season | Division | Apps | Goals | Apps | Goals | Apps | Goals | Apps | Goals | Apps | Goals |
|---|---|---|---|---|---|---|---|---|---|---|---|---|
| Excelsior | 2015–16 | Eredivisie | 1 | 0 | 0 | 0 | — | | — | | 1 | 0 |
| Jong Ajax | 2016–17 | Eerste Divisie | 2 | 0 | — | | — | | — | | 2 | 0 |
| Jong Ajax | 2017–18 | Eerste Divisie | 33 | 0 | — | | — | | — | | 33 | 0 |
| Jong Ajax | Total | | 35 | 0 | — | | — | | — | | 35 | 0 |
| Vitesse | 2018–19 | Tweede Divisie | 1 | 0 | — | | — | | — | | 1 | 0 |
| Vitesse | 2018–19 | Eredivisie | 20 | 0 | 3 | 0 | 0 | 0 | 4 (Note: Appearances in Eredivisie European play-offs) | 0 | 27 | 0 |
| Vitesse | 2019–20 | Eredivisie | 26 | 0 | 4 | 0 | — | | — | | 30 | 0 |
| Vitesse | 2020–21 | Eredivisie | 32 | 1 | 5 | 0 | — | | — | | 37 | 1 |
| Vitesse | 2021–22 | Eredivisie | 33 | 3 | 2 | 0 | 11 (Note: Appearances in UEFA Europa Conference League) | 1 | — | | 46 | 4 |
| Vitesse | Total | | 111 | 4 | 14 | 0 | 11 | 1 | 4 | 0 | 140 | 5 |
| Union Berlin | 2022–23 | Bundesliga | 25 | 5 | 3 | 0 | 8 (Note: Appearances in UEFA Europa League) | 1 | — | | 36 | 6 |
| Union Berlin | 2023–24 | Bundesliga | 24 | 2 | 1 | 0 | 3 (Note: Appearances in UEFA Champions League) | 0 | — | | 28 | 2 |
| Union Berlin | 2024–25 | Bundesliga | 34 | 1 | 2 | 0 | — | | — | | 36 | 1 |
| Union Berlin | 2025–26 | Bundesliga | 34 | 5 | 3 | 2 | — | | — | | 37 | 7 |
| Union Berlin | Total | | 117 | 13 | 9 | 2 | 11 | 1 | — | | 137 | 16 |
| Lazio | 2026–27 | Serie A | 4 | 0 | 1 | 0 | — | | 0 | 0 | 5 | 0 |
| Career total | | | 269 | 17 | 24 | 2 | 22 | 2 | 4 | 0 | 319 | 21 |

== Honours ==
Jong Ajax

- Eerste Divisie: 2017–18
