= Oussama Tannane =

Moroccan professional footballer (born 1994)

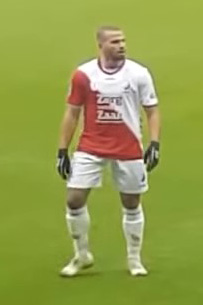
- Tannane playing for FC Utrecht in 2018

Personal information
- Date of birth: 23 March 1994 (age 32)
- Place of birth: Tétouan, Morocco
- Height: 1.77 m (5 ft 10 in)
- Position: Winger

Youth career
- Zeeburgia
- Ajax
- FC Utrecht
- PSV
- SC Heerenveen

Senior career*
Years	Team	Apps	(Gls)
2012–2013	SC Heerenveen	8	(0)
2013–2016	Heracles Almelo	53	(16)
2016–2019	Saint-Étienne	33	(3)
2017–2018	→ Las Palmas (loan)	10	(0)
2018–2019	→ Utrecht (loan)	15	(1)
2019–2021	Vitesse	50	(12)
2022	Göztepe	5	(0)
2022–2023	NEC	25	(6)
2023–2026	Umm Salal	48	(17)

International career^{‡}
2015	Netherlands U21	2	(0)
2016–2017	Morocco	11	(2)
2025–	Morocco A'	4	(1)
Medal record
Men's football
Representing Morocco
FIFA Arab Cup
Winner	2025 Qatar	Team
- * Club domestic league appearances and goals as of 05:27, 31 December 2025 (UTC) ‡ National team caps and goals as of 10 October 2017 (UTC)

Oussama Tannane (Arabic: أسامة طنان; born 23 March 1994) is a professional footballer who plays as a winger. A youth international for the Netherlands, he plays for the Morocco national team.

== Club career ==
=== Heerenveen ===
Tannane made his Eredivisie league debut for SC Heerenveen during the 2012–13 season. At the end of the season, he was released and signed with Heracles Almelo.

=== Heracles Almelo ===
On 22 August 2015, Tannane scored four goals in one half during Heracles' 6–1 win away to SC Cambuur-Leeuwarden.

=== Saint-Étienne ===
Tannane signed with Ligue 1 side AS Saint-Étienne in January 2016. In his first game with Saint-Étienne, he scored and gave assists twice, contributing greatly to his club's 4–1 victory against Ligue 1 club Bordeaux.

==== Las Palmas (loan) ====
On 1 September 2017, Tannane joined La Liga club UD Las Palmas on a season-long loan deal, which includes a buyout option. He returned after only two months, later claiming he did not know that Las Palmas is located on an island and that he should never have joined them.

==== Utrecht (loan) ====
In August 2018, Tannane again left Saint-Étienne on loan, joining Eredivisie club FC Utrecht.

=== Vitesse ===
On 12 July 2019, Tannane signed a three-year contract at Eredivisie club Vitesse. He made his debut for his new club in Vitesse's first game of the 2019–20 Eredivisie season, a 2–2 draw with Ajax. On 29 September 2019, Tannane scored his first goal for Vitesse, a late game-winning penalty in a 2–1 away victory against Eredivisie strugglers RKC Waalwijk.

Tannane started the 2020–21 season in fine form, scoring a long-range free kick in a 2–0 win against Sparta Rotterdam in Vitesse's first home game of the campaign. On 18 October 2020, Tannane was sent off by referee Richard Martens in the first half of an Eredivisie match against ADO Den Haag, after receiving two yellow cards in quick succession for dissent. In his first match back after suspension, Tannane netted a brace in a 3–1 win against Emmen to keep Vitesse level on points with Ajax at the summit of the table.

In January 2022 it was announced Vitesse terminated his contract.

=== Göztepe ===
On 8 January 2022, Tannane signed with Göztepe in Turkey.

=== NEC ===
On 21 June 2022, Tannane returned to the Netherlands and signed a two-year contract with former club Vitesse's local rivals NEC. Four minutes into his debut and first game back in the Eredivisie, Tannane let fly from the halfway line, beating the outstretched hands of Twente keeper Lars Unnerstall but narrowly missing the goal, instantly winning him over to the NEC faithful.

=== Umm Salal ===
On 22 June 2023, Tannane signed for Qatar Stars League club Umm Salal on a two-year deal.

== International career ==
Tannane was born in Morocco, but moved to Netherlands at a young age. He represented the Netherlands U21s. In March 2016, he was called up to the Morocco national football team for 2017 Africa Cup of Nations qualification matches against Cape Verde, and made his debut on 26 March in a 1–0 win.

He was part of Morocco's A' squad at the 2025 FIFA Arab Cup, where he scored the first goal from his own half in a 3–2 win after extra time over Jordan in the final.

== Career statistics ==
=== Club ===
As of match played 9 December 2023

Club	Season	League			National Cup		League Cup		Other		Total	
Club	Season	Division	Apps	Goals	Apps	Goals	Apps	Goals	Apps	Goals	Apps	Goals
Heerenveen	2012–13	Eredivisie	8	0	1	0	—		3 (Note: Appearances in the Europa League)	0	12	0
Heracles	2013–14	Eredivisie	23	4	1	0	—		—		24	4
Heracles	2014–15	Eredivisie	19	5	3	5	—		—		22	10
Heracles	2015–16	Eredivisie	11	7	2	2	—		—		13	9
Heracles	Total		53	16	6	7	—		—		59	23
Saint-Étienne	2015–16	Ligue 1	10	2	1	1	0	0	2	0	13	3
Saint-Étienne	2016–17	Ligue 1	17	1	0	0	1	0	10	1	28	2
Saint-Étienne	2017–18	Ligue 1	6	0	0	0	0	0	—		6	0
Saint-Étienne	Total		33	3	1	1	1	0	12	1	47	5
Las Palmas	2017–18	La Liga	10	0	1	0	—		—		11	0
Utrecht	2018–19	Eredivisie	8	0	2	0	—		—		10	0
Vitesse	2019–20	Eredivisie	17	5	3	1	—		—		20	6
Vitesse	2020–21	Eredivisie	29	7	5	1	—		—		34	8
Vitesse	2021–22	Eredivisie	4	0	0	0	—		3 (Note: Appearances in the UEFA Europa Conference League)	0	7	1
Vitesse	Total		50	12	8	2	—		3	1	61	15
Göztepe	2021–22	Süper Lig	5	0	0	0	—		0	0	5	0
NEC	2022–23	Eredivisie	25	6	3	1	—		0	0	28	7
Umm Salal	2023–24	QSL	11	4	0	0	—		0	0	11	4
Career total			203	41	22	11	1	0	18	2	244	54

=== International ===
As of match played 10 October 2017

Appearances and goals by national team and year
National team	Year	Apps	Goals
Morocco	2016	6	0
Morocco	2017	3	2
Total		9	2

=== International goals ===
No	Date	Venue	Opponent	Score	Result	Competition
1.	10 October 2017	Tissot Arena, Biel/Bienne, Switzerland	South Korea	1–0	3–1	Friendly
2.	10 October 2017	Tissot Arena, Biel/Bienne, Switzerland	South Korea	2–0	3–1	Friendly

== Honours ==
Umm Salal

- QSL Cup: 2023–24

Morocco A'

- FIFA Arab Cup: 2025
