= Tomáš Hájek =

Czech footballer (born 1991)

Personal information
- Date of birth: 1 December 1991 (age 34)
- Place of birth: Zlín, Czechoslovakia
- Height: 1.86 m (6 ft 1 in)
- Position: Centre-back

Youth career
- Fastav Zlín

Senior career*
Years	Team	Apps	(Gls)
2011–2017	Fastav Zlín	126	(3)
2013	→ Hradec Králové (loan)	6	(0)
2017–2019	Viktoria Plzeň	24	(1)
2019	→ Mladá Boleslav (loan)	13	(0)
2019–2023	Vitesse	43	(0)
2023	Panserraikos	1	(0)
- * Club domestic league appearances and goals as of 17 July 2023

Tomáš Hájek (born 1 December 1991) is a Czech professional footballer who plays as a centre-back.

== Career ==
Hájek made his career league debut for FC Fastav Zlín on 3 June 2011 in a 2–0 away loss at SK Kladno.

On 12 July 2019, SBV Vitesse announced that they had signed Hájek on a three-year contract. Hájek left Vitesse in June 2023.

On 2 August 2023, Hájek joined Panserraikos in Greece on a one-year contract.
