= 2021–22 UEFA Europa Conference League group stage =

International football competition

The 2021–22 UEFA Europa Conference League group stage began on 14 September 2021 and ended on 9 December 2021. A total of 32 teams competed in the group stage to decide 16 of the 24 places in the knockout phase of the 2021–22 UEFA Europa Conference League.

Alashkert, Bodø/Glimt, Flora, Kairat, Lincoln Red Imps, Mura, Randers and Union Berlin made their debut appearances in a UEFA competition group stage. Alashkert, Flora and Lincoln Red Imps were the first teams from Armenia, Estonia and Gibraltar, respectively, to play in a UEFA competition group stage.

== Draw ==
The draw for the group stage was held on 27 August 2021, 13:30 CEST (14:30 TRT), in Istanbul, Turkey. The 32 teams were drawn into eight groups of four. For the draw, the teams were seeded into four pots, each of eight teams, based on their 2021 UEFA club coefficients. Teams from the same association, and due to political reasons, teams from Azerbaijan and Armenia, shall not be drawn into the same group. Prior to the draw, UEFA formed pairings of teams from the same association, including those playing in the Europa League group stage (one pairing for associations with two or three teams, two pairings for associations with four or five teams), based on television audiences, where one team was drawn into Groups A–D and another team was drawn into Groups E–H, so that the two teams would have different kick-off times. The following pairings were announced by UEFA after the group stage teams were confirmed (the second team in a pairing marked by UEL played in the Europa League group stage):

1. (Czech Republic) Slavia Prague and Jablonec
2. (Denmark) Copenhagen and Randers
3. (Netherlands) AZ and Vitesse
4. (Greece) PAOK and Olympiacos (UEL)
5. (France) Rennes and Monaco (UEL)
6. (Israel) Maccabi Tel Aviv and Maccabi Haifa
7. (Serbia) Partizan and Red Star Belgrade (UEL)
8. (Cyprus) Omonia and Anorthosis Famagusta
11. (Netherlands) Feyenoord and PSV Eindhoven (UEL)
12. (Bulgaria) CSKA Sofia and Ludogorets Razgrad (UEL)

On each matchday, one set of four groups played their matches on 18:45 CET/CEST, while the other set of four groups played their matches on 21:00 CET/CEST, with the two sets of groups alternating between each matchday. The fixtures were decided after the draw, using a computer draw not shown to public. Each team did not play more than two home matches or two away matches in a row, and did play one home match and one away match on the first and last matchdays (Regulations Article 15.02).

== Teams ==
Below were the participating teams (with their 2021 UEFA club coefficients), grouped by their seeding pot. They included:

- 22 winners of the play-off round (5 from Champions Path, 17 from Main Path)
- 10 losers of the Europa League play-off round

Key to colours
Group winners advanced directly to round of 16
Group runners-up advanced to knockout round play-offs

Pot 1
Team	Notes	Coeff.
(Italy) Roma		90.000
(England) Tottenham Hotspur		88.000
(Switzerland) Basel		49.000
(Czech Republic) Slavia Prague		43.500
(Denmark) Copenhagen		43.500
(Belgium) Gent		26.500
(Netherlands) AZ		21.500
(Austria) LASK		21.000

Pot 2
Team	Notes	Coeff.
(Netherlands) Feyenoord		21.000
(Azerbaijan) Qarabağ		21.000
(Israel) Maccabi Tel Aviv		20.500
(Greece) PAOK		20.000
(France) Rennes		19.000
(Serbia) Partizan		18.000
(Romania) CFR Cluj		16.500
(Ukraine) Zorya Luhansk		15.000

Pot 3
Team	Notes	Coeff.
(Germany) Union Berlin		14.714
(Bulgaria) CSKA Sofia		8.000
(Netherlands) Vitesse		7.840
(Slovakia) Slovan Bratislava		7.500
(Czech Republic) Jablonec		7.000
(Armenia) Alashkert		6.500
(Estonia) Flora		6.250
(Kazakhstan) Kairat		6.000

Pot 4
Team	Notes	Coeff.
(Gibraltar) Lincoln Red Imps		5.750
(Denmark) Randers		5.575
(Cyprus) Omonia		5.550
(Cyprus) Anorthosis Famagusta		5.550
(Finland) HJK		5.500
(Israel) Maccabi Haifa		4.875
(Norway) Bodø/Glimt		4.200
(Slovenia) Mura		3.000

Notes

1. ^{ECL-CP} Winners of play-off round (Champions Path).
2. ^{ECL-MP} Winners of play-off round (Main Path).
3. ^{EL-PO} Losers of Europa League play-off round

== Format ==
In each group, teams played against each other home-and-away in a round-robin format. The winners of each group advanced to the round of 16, while the runners-up advanced to the knockout round play-offs. The third-placed and fourth-placed teams were eliminated from European competitions for the season.

=== Tiebreakers ===
Teams were ranked according to points (3 points for a win, 1 point for a draw, 0 points for a loss). If two or more teams were tied on points, the following tiebreaking criteria were applied, in the order given, to determine the rankings (see Article 16 Equality of points – group stage, Regulations of the UEFA Europa Conference League):

1. Points in head-to-head matches among the tied teams;
2. Goal difference in head-to-head matches among the tied teams;
3. Goals scored in head-to-head matches among the tied teams;
4. If more than two teams were tied, and after applying all head-to-head criteria above, a subset of teams were still tied, all head-to-head criteria above were reapplied exclusively to this subset of teams;
5. Goal difference in all group matches;
6. Goals scored in all group matches;
7. Away goals scored in all group matches;
8. Wins in all group matches;
9. Away wins in all group matches;
10. Disciplinary points (direct red card = 3 points; double yellow card = 3 points; single yellow card = 1 point);
11. UEFA club coefficient.

Due to the abolition of the away goals rule, head-to-head away goals were no longer applied as a tiebreaker starting from this season. However, total away goals were still applied as a tiebreaker.

== Groups ==
The fixtures were announced on 28 August 2021, the day after the draw. The matches were played on 14 and 16 September, 30 September, 21 October, 4 November, 25 November, and 9 December 2021 (one home match of Maccabi Haifa and Maccabi Tel Aviv was played on a Tuesday, due to Yom Kippur, which lasted from sunset 15 September to nightfall 16 September). The scheduled kick-off times were 16:30, 18:45 and 21:00 CET/CEST (all three of Kairat's home matches were played at 16:30 CET/CEST due to the time difference of Kazakhstan, and the matches rescheduled for Tuesdays were also played at 16:30 CET/CEST to avoid conflicts with Champions League matches).

Times were CET/CEST, (Note: CEST (UTC+2) for dates up to 30 October 2021 (matchdays 1–3), and CET (UTC+1) for dates thereafter (matchdays 4–6).) as listed by UEFA (local times, if different, are in parentheses).

=== Group A ===
Pos	Team	Pld	W	D	L	GF	GA	GD	Pts	Qualification	LASK	MTA	HJK	ALA
1	(Austria) LASK	6	5	1	0	12	1	+11	16	Advance to round of 16	—	1–1	3–0	2–0
2	(Israel) Maccabi Tel Aviv	6	3	2	1	14	4	+10	11	Advance to knockout round play-offs	0–1	—	3–0	4–1
3	(Finland) HJK	6	2	0	4	5	15	−10	6		0–2	0–5	—	1–0
4	(Armenia) Alashkert	6	0	1	5	4	15	−11	1		0–3	1–1	2–4	—

Source: UEFA
Rules for classification: Group stage tiebreakers
14 September 2021 (Note: The home matches of Maccabi Tel Aviv and Maccabi Haifa on matchday 1 were played on Tuesday instead of Thursday due to Yom Kippur from sunset 15 September to nightfall 16 September.)
16:30 (17:30 UTC+3)

Maccabi Tel Aviv (Israel)	4–1	(Armenia) Alashkert
Perica 13'; Kanichowsky 32'; Biton 45+3' (pen.); Hozez 72'	Report	Embaló 17'

Bloomfield Stadium, Tel Aviv
Attendance: 6,934
Referee: Espen Eskås (Norway)
16 September 2021
21:00 (22:00 UTC+3)

HJK (Finland)	0–2	(Austria) LASK
	Report	Marešić 17'; Monschein 89'

Bolt Arena, Helsinki
Attendance: 3,612
Referee: Kirill Levnikov (Russia)

30 September 2021
18:45

LASK (Austria)	1–1	(Israel) Maccabi Tel Aviv
Horvath 10'	Report	Shamir 88'

Wörthersee Stadion, Klagenfurt (Note: LASK played their home matches at Wörthersee Stadion, Klagenfurt, instead of their regular stadium Linzer Stadion, Linz, due to renovation.)
Attendance: 1,000
Referee: Mykola Balakin (Ukraine)
30 September 2021
18:45 (20:45 UTC+4)

Alashkert (Armenia)	2–4	(Finland) HJK
Embaló 24'; Glišić 90+3'	Report	Ri. Riski 8'; Valenčič 57'; Ro. Riski 63'; Olusanya 90+4'

Vazgen Sargsyan Republican Stadium, Yerevan (Note: Alashkert played their home matches at Vazgen Sargsyan Republican Stadium, Yerevan, instead of their regular stadium Alashkert Stadium, Yerevan, which did not meet UEFA requirements.)
Attendance: 2,000
Referee: Horațiu Feșnic (Romania)

21 October 2021
16:30 (17:30 UTC+3)

HJK (Finland)	0–5	(Israel) Maccabi Tel Aviv
	Report	Kanichowsky 28', 60'; Perica 49' (pen.); Saborit 87' (pen.); Shamir 90+4'

Bolt Arena, Helsinki
Attendance: 4,883
Referee: Pavel Orel (Czech Republic)
21 October 2021
18:45 (20:45 UTC+4)

Alashkert (Armenia)	0–3	(Austria) LASK
	Report	Hong 35'; Goiginger 68'; Michorl 90+2'

Vazgen Sargsyan Republican Stadium, Yerevan
Attendance: 1,500
Referee: Jens Maae (Denmark)

4 November 2021
18:45

LASK (Austria)	2–0	(Armenia) Alashkert
Nakamura 12', 87'	Report

Wörthersee Stadion, Klagenfurt
Attendance: 400
Referee: Mohammed Al-Hakim (Sweden)
4 November 2021
18:45 (19:45 UTC+2)

Maccabi Tel Aviv (Israel)	3–0	(Finland) HJK
Kuwas 22'; Lingman 65' (o.g.); Hozez 90+3'	Report

Bloomfield Stadium, Tel Aviv
Attendance: 8,029
Referee: Rade Obrenovič (Slovenia)

25 November 2021
18:45 (19:45 UTC+2)

HJK (Finland)	1–0	(Armenia) Alashkert
Tanaka 48'	Report

Bolt Arena, Helsinki
Attendance: 4,424
Referee: Bram Van Driessche (Belgium)
25 November 2021
21:00 (22:00 UTC+2)

Maccabi Tel Aviv (Israel)	0–1	(Austria) LASK
	Report	Horvath 89'

Bloomfield Stadium, Tel Aviv
Attendance: 12,203
Referee: Jérôme Brisard (France)

9 December 2021
18:45 (21:45 UTC+4)

Alashkert (Armenia)	1–1	(Israel) Maccabi Tel Aviv
Boljević 78'	Report	Almog 90'

Vazgen Sargsyan Republican Stadium, Yerevan
Attendance: 700
Referee: Gergő Bogár (Hungary)
9 December 2021
18:45

LASK (Austria)	3–0	(Finland) HJK
Balić 41'; Nakamura 63'; Gruber 81'	Report

Wörthersee Stadion, Klagenfurt
Attendance: 0 (Note: Due to the COVID-19 pandemic in Europe, the match was played behind closed doors.)
Referee: Igor Pajač (Croatia)

=== Group B ===
Pos	Team	Pld	W	D	L	GF	GA	GD	Pts	Qualification	GNT	PAR	ANO	FLO
1	(Belgium) Gent	6	4	1	1	6	2	+4	13	Advance to round of 16	—	1–1	2–0	1–0
2	(Serbia) Partizan	6	2	2	2	6	4	+2	8	Advance to knockout round play-offs	0–1	—	1–1	2–0
3	(Cyprus) Anorthosis Famagusta	6	1	3	2	6	9	−3	6		1–0	0–2	—	2–2
4	(Estonia) Flora	6	1	2	3	5	8	−3	5		0–1	1–0	2–2	—

Source: UEFA
Rules for classification: Group stage tiebreakers
16 September 2021
18:45 (19:45 UTC+3)

Flora (Estonia)	0–1	(Belgium) Gent
	Report	Lemajić 54'

Lilleküla Stadium, Tallinn
Attendance: 2,666
Referee: Trustin Farrugia Cann (Malta)
16 September 2021
21:00 (22:00 UTC+3)

Anorthosis Famagusta (Cyprus)	0–2	(Serbia) Partizan
	Report	Menig 42'; Gomes 68'

GSP Stadium, Nicosia (Note: Anorthosis Famagusta played their home matches at GSP Stadium, Nicosia, instead of their regular stadium Antonis Papadopoulos Stadium, Larnaca, which did not meet UEFA requirements.)
Attendance: 5,000
Referee: Peter Kjærsgaard-Andersen (Denmark)

30 September 2021
18:45

Gent (Belgium)	2–0	(Cyprus) Anorthosis Famagusta
Correa 28' (o.g.); Kums 81'	Report

Ghelamco Arena, Ghent
Attendance: 10,209
Referee: Filip Glova (Slovakia)
30 September 2021
18:45

Partizan (Serbia)	2–0	(Estonia) Flora
Marković 20', 42'	Report

Partizan Stadium, Belgrade
Attendance: 4,845
Referee: Julian Weinberger (Austria)

21 October 2021
18:45 (19:45 UTC+3)

Anorthosis Famagusta (Cyprus)	2–2	(Estonia) Flora
Deletić 25'; Popović 28'	Report	Sappinen 38', 80'

GSP Stadium, Nicosia
Attendance: 4,322
Referee: István Vad (Hungary)
21 October 2021
21:00

Partizan (Serbia)	0–1	(Belgium) Gent
	Report	Kums 59'

Partizan Stadium, Belgrade
Attendance: 8,943
Referee: Bobby Madden (Scotland)

4 November 2021
16:30 (17:30 UTC+2)

Flora (Estonia)	2–2	(Cyprus) Anorthosis Famagusta
Sappinen 55'; Zenjov 58'	Report	Christofi 29'; Popović 33'

Lilleküla Stadium, Tallinn
Attendance: 2,023
Referee: Kári á Høvdanum (Faroe Islands)
4 November 2021
18:45

Gent (Belgium)	1–1	(Serbia) Partizan
Tissoudali 80'	Report	Urošević 66'

Ghelamco Arena, Ghent
Attendance: 10,595
Referee: Chris Kavanagh (England)

25 November 2021
16:30 (17:30 UTC+2)

Flora (Estonia)	1–0	(Serbia) Partizan
Miller 44'	Report

Lilleküla Stadium, Tallinn
Attendance: 1,503
Referee: Rob Harvey (Republic of Ireland)
25 November 2021
21:00 (22:00 UTC+2)

Anorthosis Famagusta (Cyprus)	1–0	(Belgium) Gent
Christodoulopoulos 27'	Report

GSP Stadium, Nicosia
Attendance: 2,573
Referee: Urs Schnyder (Switzerland)

9 December 2021
18:45

Partizan (Serbia)	1–1	(Cyprus) Anorthosis Famagusta
Milovanović 20'	Report	Christodoulopoulos 33' (pen.)

Partizan Stadium, Belgrade
Attendance: 4,493
Referee: Giorgi Kruashvili (Georgia)
9 December 2021
18:45

Gent (Belgium)	1–0	(Estonia) Flora
Bruno 51'	Report

Ghelamco Arena, Ghent
Attendance: 7,421
Referee: Kaspar Sjöberg (Sweden)

=== Group C ===
Pos	Team	Pld	W	D	L	GF	GA	GD	Pts	Qualification	ROM	BOD	ZOR	CSS
1	(Italy) Roma	6	4	1	1	18	11	+7	13	Advance to round of 16	—	2–2	4–0	5–1
2	(Norway) Bodø/Glimt	6	3	3	0	14	5	+9	12	Advance to knockout round play-offs	6–1	—	3–1	2–0
3	(Ukraine) Zorya Luhansk	6	2	1	3	5	11	−6	7		0–3	1–1	—	2–0
4	(Bulgaria) CSKA Sofia	6	0	1	5	3	13	−10	1		2–3	0–0	0–1	—

Source: UEFA
Rules for classification: Group stage tiebreakers
16 September 2021
21:00

Roma (Italy)	5–1	(Bulgaria) CSKA Sofia
Pellegrini 25', 62'; El Shaarawy 38'; Mancini 82'; Abraham 84'	Report	Carey 10'

Stadio Olimpico, Rome
Attendance: 29,876
Referee: Glenn Nyberg (Sweden)
16 September 2021
21:00

Bodø/Glimt (Norway)	3–1	(Ukraine) Zorya Luhansk
Saltnes 48'; Solbakken 49'; Pellegrino 60'	Report	Hromov 90+1'

Aspmyra Stadion, Bodø
Attendance: 2,703
Referee: Dennis Higler (Netherlands)

30 September 2021
18:45 (19:45 UTC+3)

Zorya Luhansk (Ukraine)	0–3	(Italy) Roma
	Report	El Shaarawy 7'; Smalling 66'; Abraham 68'

Slavutych-Arena, Zaporizhzhia (Note: Zorya Luhansk played their home matches at Slavutych-Arena, Zaporizhzhia, instead of their regular stadium Avanhard Stadium, Luhansk, due to the war conditions in Eastern Ukraine.)
Attendance: 7,622
Referee: Luís Godinho (Portugal)
30 September 2021
18:45 (19:45 UTC+3)

CSKA Sofia (Bulgaria)	0–0	(Norway) Bodø/Glimt
	Report

Vasil Levski National Stadium, Sofia (Note: CSKA Sofia played their home matches at Vasil Levski National Stadium, Sofia, instead of their regular stadium Stadion Balgarska Armia, Sofia, which did not meet UEFA requirements.)
Attendance: 7,291
Referee: Aleksandrs Anufrijevs (Latvia)

21 October 2021
18:45

Bodø/Glimt (Norway)	6–1	(Italy) Roma
Botheim 8', 52'; Berg 20'; Solbakken 71', 80'; Pellegrino 78'	Report	Pérez 28'

Aspmyra Stadion, Bodø
Attendance: 5,652
Referee: Ali Palabıyık (Turkey)
21 October 2021
21:00 (22:00 UTC+3)

CSKA Sofia (Bulgaria)	0–1	(Ukraine) Zorya Luhansk
	Report	Sayyadmanesh 65'

Vasil Levski National Stadium, Sofia
Attendance: 3,158
Referee: Manuel Schüttengruber (Austria)

4 November 2021
18:45 (19:45 UTC+2)

Zorya Luhansk (Ukraine)	2–0	(Bulgaria) CSKA Sofia
Zahedi 87'; Sayyadmanesh 90+5'	Report

Slavutych-Arena, Zaporizhzhia
Attendance: 1,122
Referee: Petri Viljanen (Finland)
4 November 2021
21:00

Roma (Italy)	2–2	(Norway) Bodø/Glimt
El Shaarawy 54'; Ibañez 84'	Report	Solbakken 45+1'; Botheim 65'

Stadio Olimpico, Rome
Attendance: 41,031
Referee: Anastasios Papapetrou (Greece)

25 November 2021
21:00

Bodø/Glimt (Norway)	2–0	(Bulgaria) CSKA Sofia
Brunstad Fet 25'; Botheim 85'	Report

Aspmyra Stadion, Bodø
Attendance: 5,339
Referee: Yigal Frid (Israel)
25 November 2021
21:00

Roma (Italy)	4–0	(Ukraine) Zorya Luhansk
Pérez 15'; Zaniolo 33'; Abraham 46', 75'	Report

Stadio Olimpico, Rome
Attendance: 24,000
Referee: István Kovács (Romania)

9 December 2021
18:45 (19:45 UTC+2)

Zorya Luhansk (Ukraine)	1–1	(Norway) Bodø/Glimt
Nazaryna 18'	Report	Vernydub 68' (o.g.)

Slavutych-Arena, Zaporizhzhia
Attendance: 1,134
Referee: Krzysztof Jakubik (Poland)
9 December 2021
18:45 (19:45 UTC+2)

CSKA Sofia (Bulgaria)	2–3	(Italy) Roma
Čataković 75'; Wildschut 90+3'	Report	Abraham 15', 53'; Mayoral 34'

Vasil Levski National Stadium, Sofia
Attendance: 4,640
Referee: Nick Walsh (Scotland)

=== Group D ===
Pos	Team	Pld	W	D	L	GF	GA	GD	Pts	Qualification	AZ	RAN	JAB	CLJ
1	(Netherlands) AZ	6	4	2	0	8	3	+5	14	Advance to round of 16	—	1–0	1–0	2–0
2	(Denmark) Randers	6	1	4	1	9	9	0	7	Advance to knockout round play-offs	2–2	—	2–2	2–1
3	(Czech Republic) Jablonec	6	1	3	2	6	8	−2	6		1–1	2–2	—	1–0
4	(Romania) CFR Cluj	6	1	1	4	4	7	−3	4		0–1	1–1	2–0	—

Source: UEFA
Rules for classification: Group stage tiebreakers
16 September 2021
21:00

Jablonec (Czech Republic)	1–0	(Romania) CFR Cluj
Pilař 51' (pen.)	Report

Stadion Střelnice, Jablonec nad Nisou
Attendance: 2,470
Referee: Enea Jorgji (Albania)
16 September 2021
21:00

Randers (Denmark)	2–2	(Netherlands) AZ
Piesinger 27'; Graves 68'	Report	Clasie 24'; Pavlidis 34'

Randers Stadium, Randers
Attendance: 3,365
Referee: Duje Strukan (Croatia)

30 September 2021
18:45

AZ (Netherlands)	1–0	(Czech Republic) Jablonec
Guðmundsson 53'	Report

AFAS Stadion, Alkmaar
Attendance: 9,071
Referee: Rade Obrenovič (Slovenia)
30 September 2021
18:45 (19:45 UTC+3)

CFR Cluj (Romania)	1–1	(Denmark) Randers
Petrila 68'	Report	Kamara 41'

Stadionul Dr. Constantin Rădulescu, Cluj-Napoca
Attendance: 3,825
Referee: Davide Massa (Italy)

21 October 2021
21:00

Jablonec (Czech Republic)	2–2	(Denmark) Randers
Čvančara 35', 53'	Report	Odey 36', 90' (pen.)

Stadion Střelnice, Jablonec nad Nisou
Attendance: 3,678
Referee: Aliyar Aghayev (Azerbaijan)
21 October 2021
21:00 (22:00 UTC+3)

CFR Cluj (Romania)	0–1	(Netherlands) AZ
	Report	Karlsson 18'

Stadionul Dr. Constantin Rădulescu, Cluj-Napoca
Attendance: 3,628
Referee: Halis Özkahya (Turkey)

4 November 2021
18:45

AZ (Netherlands)	2–0	(Romania) CFR Cluj
Guðmundsson 5'; Pavlidis 86'	Report

AFAS Stadion, Alkmaar
Attendance: 10,554
Referee: Alain Durieux (Luxembourg)
4 November 2021
18:45

Randers (Denmark)	2–2	(Czech Republic) Jablonec
Hammershøy-Mistrati 46'; Kubista 53' (o.g.)	Report	Čvančara 73'; Kratochvíl 83'

Randers Stadium, Randers
Attendance: 4,071
Referee: Orel Grinfeld (Israel)

25 November 2021
21:00

Jablonec (Czech Republic)	1–1	(Netherlands) AZ
Kratochvíl 7'	Report	Evjen 44'

Stadion Střelnice, Jablonec nad Nisou
Attendance: 2,650
Referee: Manuel Schüttengruber (Austria)
25 November 2021
21:00

Randers (Denmark)	2–1	(Romania) CFR Cluj
Kamara 68'; Piesinger 76'	Report	Deac 72'

Randers Stadium, Randers
Attendance: 4,309
Referee: Don Robertson (Scotland)

9 December 2021
18:45

AZ (Netherlands)	1–0	(Denmark) Randers
Oosting 87'	Report

AFAS Stadion, Alkmaar
Attendance: 0
Referee: Trustin Farrugia Cann (Malta)
9 December 2021
18:45 (19:45 UTC+2)

CFR Cluj (Romania)	2–0	(Czech Republic) Jablonec
Debeljuh 45', 82'	Report

Stadionul Dr. Constantin Rădulescu, Cluj-Napoca
Attendance: 2,400
Referee: Harm Osmers (Germany)

=== Group E ===
Pos	Team	Pld	W	D	L	GF	GA	GD	Pts	Qualification	FEY	SLA	UNI	MHA
1	(Netherlands) Feyenoord	6	4	2	0	11	6	+5	14	Advance to round of 16	—	2–1	3–1	2–1
2	(Czech Republic) Slavia Prague	6	2	2	2	8	7	+1	8	Advance to knockout round play-offs	2–2	—	3–1	1–0
3	(Germany) Union Berlin	6	2	1	3	8	9	−1	7		1–2	1–1	—	3–0
4	(Israel) Maccabi Haifa	6	1	1	4	2	7	−5	4		0–0	1–0	0–1	—

Source: UEFA
Rules for classification: Group stage tiebreakers
14 September 2021
16:30 (17:30 UTC+3)

Maccabi Haifa (Israel)	0–0	(Netherlands) Feyenoord
	Report

Sammy Ofer Stadium, Haifa
Attendance: 15,850
Referee: Fabio Maresca (Italy)
16 September 2021
18:45

Slavia Prague (Czech Republic)	3–1	(Germany) Union Berlin
Bah 18'; Kuchta 84'; Schranz 88'	Report	Behrens 70'

Sinobo Stadium, Prague
Attendance: 15,286
Referee: Fábio Veríssimo (Portugal)

30 September 2021
21:00

Feyenoord (Netherlands)	2–1	(Czech Republic) Slavia Prague
Kökçü 14'; Linssen 24'	Report	Holeš 63'

De Kuip, Rotterdam
Attendance: 38,505
Referee: Radu Petrescu (Romania)
30 September 2021
21:00

Union Berlin (Germany)	3–0	(Israel) Maccabi Haifa
Voglsammer 33'; Behrens 48'; Awoniyi 76'	Report

Olympiastadion, Berlin (Note: Union Berlin played their home matches at Olympiastadion, Berlin, instead of their regular stadium Stadion An der Alten Försterei, Berlin, which did not meet UEFA requirements.)
Attendance: 23,342
Referee: Nick Walsh (Scotland)

21 October 2021
18:45 (19:45 UTC+3)

Maccabi Haifa (Israel)	1–0	(Czech Republic) Slavia Prague
Donyoh 24'	Report

Sammy Ofer Stadium, Haifa
Attendance: 10,000
Referee: Ádám Farkas (Hungary)
21 October 2021
18:45

Feyenoord (Netherlands)	3–1	(Germany) Union Berlin
Jahanbakhsh 11'; Linssen 29'; Sinisterra 76'	Report	Awoniyi 35'

De Kuip, Rotterdam
Attendance: 36,100
Referee: Giorgi Kruashvili (Georgia)

4 November 2021
21:00

Slavia Prague (Czech Republic)	1–0	(Israel) Maccabi Haifa
Kuchta 49'	Report

Sinobo Stadium, Prague
Attendance: 13,646
Referee: Kai Erik Steen (Norway)
4 November 2021
21:00

Union Berlin (Germany)	1–2	(Netherlands) Feyenoord
Trimmel 41'	Report	Sinisterra 15'; Dessers 72'

Olympiastadion, Berlin
Attendance: 30,000
Referee: Daniel Stefański (Poland)

25 November 2021
18:45 (19:45 UTC+2)

Maccabi Haifa (Israel)	0–1	(Germany) Union Berlin
	Report	Ryerson 66'

Sammy Ofer Stadium, Haifa
Attendance: 22,150
Referee: Michal Ocenáš (Slovakia)
25 November 2021
18:45

Slavia Prague (Czech Republic)	2–2	(Netherlands) Feyenoord
Olayinka 12'; Kuchta 66'	Report	Dessers 31', 90+3'

Sinobo Stadium, Prague
Attendance: 14,562
Referee: Mattias Gestranius (Finland)

9 December 2021
21:00

Feyenoord (Netherlands)	2–1	(Israel) Maccabi Haifa
Dessers 38'; Nelson 65'	Report	David 90+1'

De Kuip, Rotterdam
Attendance: 0
Referee: Mykola Balakin (Ukraine)
9 December 2021
21:00

Union Berlin (Germany)	1–1	(Czech Republic) Slavia Prague
Kruse 64'	Report	Schranz 50'

Olympiastadion, Berlin
Attendance: 4,380
Referee: Rade Obrenović (Slovenia)

=== Group F ===
Pos	Team	Pld	W	D	L	GF	GA	GD	Pts	Qualification	COP	PAO	SLO	LIN
1	(Denmark) Copenhagen	6	5	0	1	15	5	+10	15	Advance to round of 16	—	1–2	2–0	3–1
2	(Greece) PAOK	6	3	2	1	8	4	+4	11	Advance to knockout round play-offs	1–2	—	1–1	2–0
3	(Slovakia) Slovan Bratislava	6	2	2	2	8	7	+1	8		1–3	0–0	—	2–0
4	(Gibraltar) Lincoln Red Imps	6	0	0	6	2	17	−15	0		0–4	0–2	1–4	—

Source: UEFA
Rules for classification: Group stage tiebreakers
16 September 2021
18:45

Slovan Bratislava (Slovakia)	1–3	(Denmark) Copenhagen
Henty 21'	Report	Wind 18', 68' (pen.); Stage 41'

Tehelné pole, Bratislava
Attendance: 9,833
Referee: Michael Fabbri (Italy)
16 September 2021
18:45

Lincoln Red Imps (Gibraltar)	0–2	(Greece) PAOK
	Report	Akpom 45+2'; Mitriță 56'

Victoria Stadium, Gibraltar
Attendance: 668
Referee: Rob Harvey (Republic of Ireland)

30 September 2021
21:00

Copenhagen (Denmark)	3–1	(Gibraltar) Lincoln Red Imps
R. Chipolina 4' (o.g.); Wind 45+1' (pen.); Stage 52'	Report	Rosa 33'

Parken Stadium, Copenhagen
Attendance: 13,418
Referee: Kateryna Monzul (Ukraine)
30 September 2021
21:00 (22:00 UTC+3)

PAOK (Greece)	1–1	(Slovakia) Slovan Bratislava
Akpom 9'	Report	Green 15'

Toumba Stadium, Thessaloniki
Attendance: 7,537
Referee: João Pinheiro (Portugal)

21 October 2021
18:45

Copenhagen (Denmark)	1–2	(Greece) PAOK
Biel 80'	Report	Sidcley 19'; A. Živković 38'

Parken Stadium, Copenhagen
Attendance: 19,552
Referee: Erik Lambrechts (Belgium)
21 October 2021
21:00

Slovan Bratislava (Slovakia)	2–0	(Gibraltar) Lincoln Red Imps
Green 46'; Henty 84'	Report

Tehelné pole, Bratislava
Attendance: 6,108
Referee: Vilhjamur Thórarinsson (Iceland)

4 November 2021
18:45

Lincoln Red Imps (Gibraltar)	1–4	(Slovakia) Slovan Bratislava
R. Chipolina 45+3'	Report	Green 17', 25'; Čavrić 67'; Mráz 71'

Victoria Stadium, Gibraltar
Attendance: 553
Referee: Kristoffer Karlsson (Sweden)
4 November 2021
21:00 (22:00 UTC+2)

PAOK (Greece)	1–2	(Denmark) Copenhagen
A. Živković 8'	Report	Ankersen 34'; Biel 50'

Toumba Stadium, Thessaloniki
Attendance: 11,166
Referee: Paweł Raczkowski (Poland)

25 November 2021
18:45

Slovan Bratislava (Slovakia)	0–0	(Greece) PAOK
	Report

Tehelné pole, Bratislava
Attendance: 200
Referee: Dennis Higler (Netherlands)
25 November 2021
18:45

Lincoln Red Imps (Gibraltar)	0–4	(Denmark) Copenhagen
	Report	Jóhannesson 5'; Lerager 7'; Bøving 63'; Højlund 73'

Victoria Stadium, Gibraltar
Attendance: 1,008
Referee: Helgi Mikael Jónasson (Iceland)

9 December 2021
21:00 (22:00 UTC+2)

PAOK (Greece)	2–0	(Gibraltar) Lincoln Red Imps
A. Živković 17'; Schwab 55'	Report

Toumba Stadium, Thessaloniki
Attendance: 4,648
Referee: Rohit Saggi (Norway)
9 December 2021
21:00

Copenhagen (Denmark)	2–0	(Slovakia) Slovan Bratislava
Wind 30'; Højlund 53'	Report

Parken Stadium, Copenhagen
Attendance: 13,021
Referee: István Vad (Hungary)

=== Group G ===
Pos	Team	Pld	W	D	L	GF	GA	GD	Pts	Qualification	REN	VIT	TOT	MUR
1	(France) Rennes	6	4	2	0	13	7	+6	14	Advance to round of 16	—	3–3	2–2	1–0
2	(Netherlands) Vitesse	6	3	1	2	12	9	+3	10	Advance to knockout round play-offs	1–2	—	1–0	3–1
3	(England) Tottenham Hotspur	6	2	1	3	11	11	0	7		0–3 (Note: The Tottenham Hotspur v Rennes match was awarded as a 3–0 win to Rennes due to numerous positive COVID-19 tests in the Tottenham Hotspur squad.)	3–2	—	5–1
4	(Slovenia) Mura	6	1	0	5	5	14	−9	3		1–2	0–2	2–1	—

Source: UEFA
Rules for classification: Group stage tiebreakers
Notes:
16 September 2021
18:45

Rennes (France)	2–2	(England) Tottenham Hotspur
Tait 23'; Laborde 72'	Report	Badé 11' (o.g.); Højbjerg 76'

Roazhon Park, Rennes
Attendance: 22,000
Referee: Halis Özkahya (Turkey)
16 September 2021
18:45

Mura (Slovenia)	0–2	(Netherlands) Vitesse
	Report	Tronstad 30'; Doekhi 69'

Ljudski vrt, Maribor (Note: Mura played their home matches at Ljudski vrt, Maribor, instead of their regular stadium Fazanerija City Stadium, Murska Sobota, which did not meet UEFA requirements.)
Attendance: 3,300
Referee: Mohammed Al-Hakim (Sweden)

30 September 2021
21:00 (20:00 UTC+1)

Tottenham Hotspur (England)	5–1	(Slovenia) Mura
Alli 4' (pen.); Lo Celso 8'; Kane 68', 76', 87'	Report	Kous 53'

Tottenham Hotspur Stadium, London
Attendance: 25,121
Referee: Yigal Frid (Israel)
30 September 2021
21:00

Vitesse (Netherlands)	1–2	(France) Rennes
Wittek 30'	Report	Guirassy 54' (pen.); Kamaldeen 70'

GelreDome, Arnhem
Attendance: 14,571
Referee: Kevin Clancy (Scotland)

21 October 2021
18:45

Mura (Slovenia)	1–2	(France) Rennes
Lotrič 20'	Report	Guirassy 17' (pen.); Laborde 41'

Ljudski vrt, Maribor
Attendance: 3,500
Referee: Volen Chinkov (Bulgaria)
21 October 2021
18:45

Vitesse (Netherlands)	1–0	(England) Tottenham Hotspur
Wittek 78'	Report

GelreDome, Arnhem
Attendance: 23,931
Referee: Harm Osmers (Germany)

4 November 2021
21:00

Rennes (France)	1–0	(Slovenia) Mura
Badé 76'	Report

Roazhon Park, Rennes
Attendance: 23,115
Referee: Juri Frischer (Estonia)
4 November 2021
21:00 (20:00 UTC+0)

Tottenham Hotspur (England)	3–2	(Netherlands) Vitesse
Son Heung-min 15'; Lucas 22'; Rasmussen 28' (o.g.)	Report	Rasmussen 32'; Bero 39'

Tottenham Hotspur Stadium, London
Attendance: 36,312
Referee: Marco Di Bello (Italy)

25 November 2021
18:45

Rennes (France)	3–3	(Netherlands) Vitesse
Laborde 9', 39', 69'	Report	Huisman 43'; Buitink 75'; Openda 90'

Roazhon Park, Rennes
Attendance: 23,081
Referee: Espen Eskås (Norway)
25 November 2021
18:45

Mura (Slovenia)	2–1	(England) Tottenham Hotspur
Horvat 11'; Maroša 90+4'	Report	Kane 72'

Ljudski vrt, Maribor
Attendance: 6,100
Referee: Antonio Emanuel Carvalho Nobre (Portugal)

9 December 2021
21:00 (20:00 UTC+1)

Tottenham Hotspur (England)	0–3 Awarded (Note: The Tottenham Hotspur v Rennes match did not take place due to numerous positive COVID-19 tests in the Tottenham Hotspur squad. On 20 December 2021, UEFA awarded a 3–0 win to Rennes.)	(France) Rennes
	Report

Tottenham Hotspur Stadium, London
Referee: Horațiu Feșnic (Romania)
9 December 2021
21:00

Vitesse (Netherlands)	3–1	(Slovenia) Mura
Buitink 4'; Openda 35'; Huisman 40'	Report	Maroša 82'

GelreDome, Arnhem
Attendance: 0
Referee: Filip Glova (Slovakia)

=== Group H ===
Pos	Team	Pld	W	D	L	GF	GA	GD	Pts	Qualification	BAS	QAR	OMO	KAI
1	(Switzerland) Basel	6	4	2	0	14	6	+8	14	Advance to round of 16	—	3–0	3–1	4–2
2	(Azerbaijan) Qarabağ	6	3	2	1	10	8	+2	11	Advance to knockout round play-offs	0–0	—	2–2	2–1
3	(Cyprus) Omonia	6	0	4	2	5	10	−5	4		1–1	1–4	—	0–0
4	(Kazakhstan) Kairat	6	0	2	4	6	11	−5	2		2–3	1–2	0–0	—

Source: UEFA
Rules for classification: Group stage tiebreakers
16 September 2021
16:30 (20:30 UTC+6)

Kairat (Kazakhstan)	0–0	(Cyprus) Omonia
	Report

Central Stadium, Almaty
Attendance: 7,038
Referee: Serhiy Boiko (Ukraine)
16 September 2021
18:45 (20:45 UTC+4)

Qarabağ (Azerbaijan)	0–0	(Switzerland) Basel
	Report

Olympic Stadium, Baku (Note: Qarabağ played their first home match at Olympic Stadium, Baku, and played the other two home matches at Tofiq Bahramov Republican Stadium, Baku, instead of their regular stadium Azersun Arena, Baku, which did not meet UEFA requirements.)
Attendance: 17,586
Referee: Erik Lambrechts (Belgium)

30 September 2021
21:00

Basel (Switzerland)	4–2	(Kazakhstan) Kairat
Cabral 15'; Lang 21', 40'; Ndoye 49'	Report	Kanté 65'; Alves 69' (pen.)

St. Jakob-Park, Basel
Attendance: 8,712
Referee: Stuart Attwell (England)
30 September 2021
21:00 (22:00 UTC+3)

Omonia (Cyprus)	1–4	(Azerbaijan) Qarabağ
Lecjaks 40'	Report	Kady 52', 90+4'; Sheydaev 73'; Medvedev 79' (pen.)

GSP Stadium, Nicosia
Attendance: 8,345
Referee: Bobby Madden (Scotland)

21 October 2021
18:45 (20:45 UTC+4)

Qarabağ (Azerbaijan)	2–1	(Kazakhstan) Kairat
Sheydayev 79'; A. Huseynov 90+1'	Report	Kanté 19' (pen.)

Tofiq Bahramov Republican Stadium, Baku
Attendance: 17,252
Referee: Yevhen Aranovskyi (Ukraine)
21 October 2021
21:00

Basel (Switzerland)	3–1	(Cyprus) Omonia
Millar 19'; Cabral 41' (pen.); Zhegrova 88'	Report	Gómez 27' (pen.)

St. Jakob-Park, Basel
Attendance: 10,056
Referee: Stéphanie Frappart (France)

4 November 2021
16:30 (21:30 UTC+6)

Kairat (Kazakhstan)	1–2	(Azerbaijan) Qarabağ
Kanté 68'	Report	Wadji 58'; Zoubir 72'

Central Stadium, Almaty
Attendance: 2,638
Referee: Dumitri Muntean (Moldova)
4 November 2021
18:45 (19:45 UTC+2)

Omonia (Cyprus)	1–1	(Switzerland) Basel
Kakoullis 17'	Report	Millar 57'

GSP Stadium, Nicosia
Attendance: 4,597
Referee: Vitali Meshkov (Russia)

25 November 2021
16:30 (21:30 UTC+6)

Kairat (Kazakhstan)	2–3	(Switzerland) Basel
Vágner Love 23'; Hovhannisyan 56'	Report	Cabral 45' (pen.); Zhegrova 69'; Kasami 73'

Central Stadium, Almaty
Attendance: 4,159
Referee: Goga Kikacheishvili (Georgia)
25 November 2021
18:45 (21:45 UTC+4)

Qarabağ (Azerbaijan)	2–2	(Cyprus) Omonia
Psaltis 49' (o.g.); Andrade 88'	Report	Ďuriš 43' (pen.); Gómez 90'

Tofiq Bahramov Republican Stadium, Baku
Attendance: 17,231
Referee: Morten Krogh (Denmark)

9 December 2021
21:00

Basel (Switzerland)	3–0	(Azerbaijan) Qarabağ
Cabral 33', 74'; Kasami 62'	Report

St. Jakob-Park, Basel
Attendance: 10,059
Referee: Fran Jović (Croatia)
9 December 2021
21:00 (22:00 UTC+2)

Omonia (Cyprus)	0–0	(Kazakhstan) Kairat
	Report

GSP Stadium, Nicosia
Attendance: 3,239
Referee: Genc Nuza (Kosovo)
