= 2021–22 SBV Vitesse season =

SBV Vitesse
2021–22 season
- Owner: Valeriy Oyf
- Chairman: Yevgeny Merkel
- Head coach: Thomas Letsch
- Stadium: GelreDome
- Eredivisie: 6th
- KNVB Cup: Quarter-finals
- UEFA Europa Conference League: Round of 16
- Top goalscorer: League: Loïs Openda (21); All: Loïs Openda (27)
- Biggest win: 2–1 (vs. Dundalk (a), 12 August 2021) (vs. Anderlecht (h), 26 August 2021)
- Biggest defeat: 0–3 (vs. Willem II (h), 22 August 2021)
Home colours	Away colours	Third colours

The 2021–22 season was the 129th season in the existence of SBV Vitesse and the club's 32nd consecutive season in the top flight of Dutch football. In addition to the domestic league, Vitesse participated in this season's editions of the KNVB Cup and the inaugural UEFA Europa Conference League.

== Players ==
=== First-team squad ===
As of 13 January 2022

Note: Flags indicate national team as defined under FIFA eligibility rules; some limited exceptions apply. Players may hold more than one non-FIFA nationality.

No.	Pos.	Nation	Player
1	GK	GER	Markus Schubert
2	DF	ISR	Eli Dasa
3	DF	NED	Danilho Doekhi (captain)
6	DF	DEN	Jacob Rasmussen (on loan from Fiorentina)
7	FW	BEL	Loïs Openda (on loan from Club Brugge)
8	MF	NOR	Sondre Tronstad
9	FW	AUT	Adrian Grbić (on loan from FC Lorient)
10	MF	NED	Riechedly Bazoer
11	FW	DEN	Nikolai Baden Frederiksen
16	DF	CRO	Alois Oroz
18	DF	CZE	Tomáš Hájek
20	MF	FRA	Yann Gboho (on loan from Stade Rennais)
21	MF	SVK	Matúš Bero (vice-captain)

No.	Pos.	Nation	Player
22	MF	KOS	Toni Domgjoni
23	GK	NED	Eric Verstappen
24	GK	NED	Jeroen Houwen
27	DF	FRA	Romaric Yapi
29	FW	NED	Thomas Buitink
32	DF	GER	Maximilian Wittek
33	GK	NED	Daan Reiziger
36	MF	NED	Patrick Vroegh
39	DF	NED	Enzo Cornelisse
40	MF	NED	Daan Huisman
42	DF	NED	Million Manhoef
44	FW	ESA	Enrico Hernández
52	FW	NED	Gyan de Regt

=== Players out on loan ===
Note: Flags indicate national team as defined under FIFA eligibility rules; some limited exceptions apply. Players may hold more than one non-FIFA nationality.

No.	Pos.	Nation	Player
9	FW	ALG	Oussama Darfalou (at PEC Zwolle until 30 June 2022)

== Transfers ==
=== In ===
Pos.	Name	From	Fee	Ref.
FW	(Netherlands) Thomas Buitink	(Netherlands) PEC Zwolle	End of loan	
MF	(France) Yann Gboho	(France) Stade Rennais	Loan	
FW	(Denmark) Nikolai Frederiksen	(Italy) Juventus		
GK	(Germany) Markus Schubert	(Germany) Schalke 04	Free transfer	
DEF	(France) Romaric Yapi	(England) Brighton & Hove Albion	Free transfer	
MF	(Switzerland) Toni Domgjoni	(Switzerland) FC Zürich	Free transfer	
GK	(Netherlands) Daan Reiziger	(Netherlands) Jong Ajax	Free transfer	
FW	(Switzerland) Julian Von Moos	(Switzerland) FC Basel	Loan	
FW	(Austria) Adrian Grbić	(France) Lorient	Loan	
FW	(Netherlands) Simon van Duivenbooden	(Netherlands) PSV	Loan	

=== Out ===
Pos.	Name	To	Fee	Ref.
FW	(Netherlands) Noah Ohio	(Germany) RB Leipzig	Loan return	
MF	(Germany) Idrissa Touré	(Italy) Juventus	Loan return	
FW	(Albania) Armando Broja	(England) Chelsea	Loan return	
GK	(Netherlands) Remko Pasveer	(Netherlands) Ajax	Free transfer	
GK	(Netherlands) Bilal Bayazit	(Turkey) Kayserispor	Free transfer	
MF	(Netherlands) Thomas Bruns	(Turkey) Adanaspor	Free transfer	
FW	(El Salvador) Enrico Hernández	(Netherlands) FC Eindhoven	Loan	

== Pre-season and friendlies ==
Win Draw Loss Fixtures

30 June 2021 Friendly	Vitesse	1–3	AEK Athens	Burgh-Haamstede
18:00 EEST (UTC+3)	Oroz 36'	Report	Bakakis 17'; Albanis 37'; Macheras 83'	Stadium: Sportpark Van Zuijen

6 July 2021 Friendly	Vitesse	0–5	Nordsjælland	Netherlands
15:00 CEST (UTC+2)			2'; 42'; 82'; 84'; 86'
Note: three halves of 40 minutes.

13 July 2021 Friendly	Vitesse	2–1	OFI	Netherlands
18:00 CEST (UTC+2)

16 July 2021 Friendly	Schalke 04	3–2	Vitesse	Gelsenkirchen, Germany
18:00 CEST (UTC+2)	Terodde 53', 65'; Idrizi 83'		Manhoef 73'; Oroz 88'	Stadium: Parkstadion; Attendance: 1,000

23 July 2021 Friendly	Go Ahead Eagles	1–1	Vitesse	Netherlands
19:00 CEST (UTC+2)

24 July 2021 Friendly	Vitesse	0–1	Lommel	Arnhem, Netherlands
19:00 CEST (UTC+2)				Stadium: GelreDome

29 July 2021 Friendly	VfL Bochum	1–2	Vitesse	Germany
16:30 CEST (UTC+2)

== Competitions ==
=== Overall record ===
Competition	First match	Last match	Starting round	Final position	Record							
Competition	First match	Last match	Starting round	Final position	Pld	W	D	L	GF	GA	GD	Win %
Eredivisie	15 August 2021	15 May 2022	Matchday 1	6th	34	15	6	13	42	51	−9	44.12
Eredivisie Play-offs	19 May 2022	29 May 2022	Semi-finals	Runners-up	4	2	0	2	7	10	−3	50.00
KNVB Cup	15 December 2021	9 February 2022	Second round	Quarter-finals	3	2	0	1	4	6	−2	66.67
Europa Conference League	19 August 2021	17 March 2022	Third qualifying round	Round of 16	14	6	4	4	25	20	+5	42.86
Total					55	25	10	20	78	87	−9	45.45

Last updated: 29 May 2022
Source: Soccerway

=== Eredivisie ===
==== League table ====
Pos	Team	Pld	W	D	L	GF	GA	GD	Pts	Qualification or relegation
4	Twente	34	20	8	6	55	37	+18	68	Qualification for the Europa Conference League third qualifying round
5	AZ (O)	34	18	7	9	64	44	+20	61	Qualification for the European competition play-offs
6	Vitesse	34	15	6	13	42	51	−9	51	Qualification for the European competition play-offs
7	Utrecht	34	12	11	11	51	46	+5	47	Qualification for the European competition play-offs
8	Heerenveen	34	11	8	15	37	50	−13	41	Qualification for the European competition play-offs

Source: Eredivisie
Rules for classification: Season in progress: 1) Most points won; 2) Less points lost; 3) Goal difference; 4) Goals scored; 5) Alphabetical order; End of season: 1) Points; 2) Goal difference; 3) Goals scored; 4) Head-to-head points; 5) Head-to-head goal difference; 6) Head-to-head away goals scored; 7) Play-off if relevant for deciding champion, relegation or participating in a European league, otherwise by draw. 8) Penalty shoot-out (only after a play-off)
(O) Play-off winners

==== Results summary ====
Overall								Home						Away					
Pld	W	D	L	GF	GA	GD	Pts	W	D	L	GF	GA	GD	W	D	L	GF	GA	GD
34	15	6	13	42	51	−9	51	6	3	8	20	29	−9	9	3	5	22	22	0

Source: Eredivisie

==== Results by round ====
Round	1	2	3	4	5	6	7	8	9	10	11	12	13	14	15	16	17	18	19	20	21	22	23	24	25	26	27	28	29	30	31	32	33	34
Ground	A	H	A	A	H	A	H	H	A	H	A	H	A	H	A	H	A	H	A	H	A	H	A	H	H	A	H	A	H	A	A	H	A	H
Result	W	L	L	W	L	W	D	W	W	L	W	W	L	D	W	W	D	W	W	L	L	L	D	W	L	D	L	L	W	L	W	L	W	D
Position	9	11	14	10	12	9	9	8	6	6	5	5	5	6	5	4	5	4	4	6	6	6	6	6	7	6	6	7	6	6	6	6	6	6

Source: Eredivisie
A = Away; H = Home; W = Win; D = Draw; L = Loss

==== Matches ====
The league fixtures were announced on 11 June 2021.

15 August 2021 1	PEC Zwolle	0–1	Vitesse	Zwolle
14:30 CEST (UTC+2)		Report	Frederiksen 20'; Bero (yellow card) 31'; Buitink (yellow card) 72'	Stadium: MAC³PARK Stadion; Referee: Richard Martens

22 August 2021 2	Vitesse	0–3	Willem II	Arnhem
16:45 CEST (UTC+2)	Oroz (yellow card) 24'; Bero (yellow card) 55'; Tannane (yellow card) 65'; Wittek (yellow card) 78'	Report	Wriedt 18'; Jenssen (yellow card) 28'; Nunnely 36'; Kabangu (yellow card) 71'; Spieringhs 82'	Stadium: GelreDome; Attendance: 11,329; Referee: Allard Lindhout

29 August 2021 3	Ajax	5–0	Vitesse	Amsterdam
14:30 CEST (UTC+2)	Antony 5'; Álvarez 31'; Gravenberch 43'; Hájek 60' (o.g.); Klaassen 67'	Report	Bazoer (yellow card) 41'; Oroz (yellow card) 85'	Stadium: Johan Cruyff Arena; Attendance: 36,816; Referee: Danny Makkelie

12 September 2021 4	RKC Waalwijk	1–2	Vitesse	Waalwijk
16:45 CEST (UTC+2)	Bakari 27'	Report	Doekhi 8'; Gboho 54'	Stadium: Mandemakers Stadion; Attendance: 4,989; Referee: Jochem Kamphuis

19 September 2021 5	Vitesse	1–4	FC Twente	Arnhem
16:45 CEST (UTC+2)		Report		Stadium: GelreDome; Attendance: 13,808; Referee: Pol van Boekel

22 September 2021 6	FC Groningen	0–1	Vitesse	Groningen
20:00 CEST (UTC+2)		Report	Gboho 45+3'	Stadium: Euroborg; Attendance: 14,963; Referee: Allard Lindhout

25 September 2021 7	Vitesse	1–1	Fortuna Sittard	Arnhem
18:45 CEST (UTC+2)		Report		Stadium: GelreDome; Attendance: 11,631; Referee: Ingmar Oostrom

3 October 2021 8	Vitesse	2–1	Feyenoord	Arnhem
16:45 CEST (UTC+2)	Openda 6', 46'	Report	Til 29'	Stadium: GelreDome; Attendance: 14,328; Referee: Serdar Gözübüyük

17 October 2021 9	N.E.C.	0–1	Vitesse	Nijmegen
14:30 CEST (UTC+2)		Report		Stadium: Goffertstadion; Attendance: 12,500; Referee: Allard Lindhout

24 October 2021 10	Vitesse	1–2	Go Ahead Eagles	Arnhem
14:30 CEST (UTC+2)		Report		Stadium: GelreDome; Attendance: 12,783; Referee: Dennis Higler

30 October 2021 11	SC Heerenveen	1–2	Vitesse	Heerenveen
20:00 CEST (UTC+2)		Report		Stadium: Abe Lenstra Stadion; Attendance: 17,187; Referee: Martin van den Kerkhof

7 November 2021 12	Vitesse	2–1	FC Utrecht	Arnhem
16:45 CET (UTC+1)	Frederiksen 7'; Bazoer 45+2'	Report	Janssen (yellow card) 64'; Zagre 77'; Maher (yellow card) 90+1'; Mallahi (yellow card) 90+9'	Stadium: GelreDome; Attendance: 15,867; Referee: Jochem Kamphuis

20 November 2021 13	PSV	2–0	Vitesse	Eindhoven
16:30 CET (UTC+1)	Sangaré 19'; Bruma 30'	Report	Openda (yellow card) 25'; Wittek (yellow card) 45'	Stadium: Philips Stadion; Attendance: 0 Referee: Bas Nijhuis

28 November 2021 14	Vitesse	0–0	AZ	Arnhem
20:00 CET (UTC+1)		Report		Stadium: GelreDome; Attendance: 0 Referee: Danny Makkelie

4 December 2021 15	SC Cambuur	1–6	Vitesse	Leeuwarden
18:45 CET (UTC+1)	Tol 41'	Report	Tronstad 26', 49'; Openda 30', 64'; Buitink 36'; Frederiksen 79'	Stadium: Cambuur Stadion; Attendance: 0 Referee: Serdar Gözübüyük

12 December 2021 16	Vitesse	2–1	Heracles Almelo	Arnhem
14:30 CET (UTC+1)		Report		Stadium: GelreDome; Attendance: 0 Referee: Jeroen Manschot

18 December 2021 17	Sparta Rotterdam	2–2	Vitesse	Rotterdam
18:45 CET (UTC+1)	Mijnans 70', 90+3'	Report	Frederiksen 16', 37'	Stadium: Het Kasteel; Attendance: 0 Referee: Bas Nijhuis

21 December 2021 18	Vitesse	1–0	PEC Zwolle	Arnhem
18:45 CET (UTC+1)	Openda 47'	Report		Stadium: GelreDome; Attendance: 0 Referee: Pol van Boekel

15 January 2022 19	Feyenoord	0–1	Vitesse	Rotterdam
20:00 CET (UTC+1)		Report	Openda 69'	Stadium: De Kuip; Attendance: 0 Referee: Allard Lindhout

22 January 2022 20	Vitesse	1–3	FC Groningen	Arnhem
18:45 CET (UTC+1)		Report		Stadium: GelreDome; Attendance: 0 Referee: Dennis Higler

5 February 2022 21	FC Twente	3–0	Vitesse	Enschede
21:00 CET (UTC+1)		Report		Stadium: De Grolsch Veste; Attendance: 0 Referee: Danny Makkelie

12 February 2022 22	Vitesse	0–5	PSV	Arnhem
20:00 CET (UTC+1)	Bazoer (yellow card) 38'; Oroz (yellow card) 67'	Report	Zahavi 4'; Mauro Júnior 24'; Gakpo 28'; Carlos Vinícius 62'; Dōan 88'	Stadium: GelreDome; Attendance: 9,177; Referee: Serdar Gözübüyük

20 February 2022 23	FC Utrecht	1–1	Vitesse	Utrecht
16:45 CET (UTC+1)	Sylla 14', (yellow card) 62'; Van de Streek (yellow card) 42'; Maher (yellow card) 72'	Report	Tronstad (yellow card) 59'; Wittek (yellow card) 64'; Grbic (red card) 65'; Doekhi 90+2'	Stadium: Galgenwaard; Attendance: 16,886; Referee: Allard Lindhout

27 February 2022 24	Vitesse	4–1	NEC	Arnhem
12:15 CET (UTC+1)	Doekhi 54'; Oroz 56', 80'; Buitink 90+5'	Report	Duelund 49'	Stadium: GelreDome; Attendance: 13,877; Referee: Danny Makkelie

13 March 2022 26	Heracles Almelo	0–0	Vitesse	Almelo
14:30 CET (UTC+1)		Report		Stadium: Erve Asito; Attendance: 7,035; Referee: Jochem Kamphuis

20 March 2022 27	Vitesse	1–2	RKC Waalwijk	Arnhem
16:45 CET (UTC+1)		Report		Stadium: GelreDome; Attendance: 13,625; Referee: Joey Kooij

2 April 2022 28	AZ	3–1	Vitesse	Alkmaar
15:00 CEST (UTC+2)	Pavlidis 32'; Rasmussen 56' (o.g.); Karlsson 83' (pen.)	Report	Tronstad 63'	Stadium: AFAS Stadion; Attendance: 17,406; Referee: Jeroen Manschot

10 April 2022 29	Vitesse	1–0	SC Cambuur	Arnhem
14:30 CEST (UTC+2)	Openda 42'	Report		Stadium: GelreDome; Attendance: 14,970; Referee: Edwin van de Graaf

19 April 2022 25	Vitesse	0–1	Sparta Rotterdam	Arnhem
18:45 CEST (UTC+2)		Report	Dalmau 5'	Stadium: GelreDome; Attendance: 9,771; Referee: Bas Nijhuis

24 April 2022 30	Willem II	1–0	Vitesse	Tilburg
12:30 CEST (UTC+2)		Report		Stadium: Koning Willem II Stadion; Attendance: 14,500; Referee: Serdar Gözübüyük

1 May 2022 31	Go Ahead Eagles	1–2	Vitesse	Deventer
14:30 CEST (UTC+2)		Report		Stadium: De Adelaarshorst; Attendance: 9,814; Referee: Jeroen Manschot

8 May 2022 32	Vitesse	1–2	SC Heerenveen	Arnhem
14:30 CEST (UTC+2)		Report		Stadium: GelreDome; Attendance: 14,710; Referee: Richard Martens

11 May 2022 33	Fortuna Sittard	1–2	Vitesse	Sittard
20:00 CEST (UTC+2)	Gladon 44' (pen.)	Report	Manhoef 45+1'; Openda 63'	Stadium: Fortuna Sittard Stadion; Attendance: 10,883; Referee: Pol van Boekel

15 May 2022 34	Vitesse	2–2	Ajax	Arnhem
14:30 CEST (UTC+2)	Openda 52', 56'	Report	Brobbey 15'; Álvarez (yellow card) 24', (goal) 87'; Blind (yellow card) 73'; Klaassen (yellow card) 76'	Stadium: GelreDome; Attendance: 18,920; Referee: Bas Nijhuis

==== European competition play-offs ====
19 May 2022 Semi-finals First leg	FC Utrecht	3–1	Vitesse	Utrecht
21:00 CEST (UTC+2)	Janssen 3'; Van de Streek 21', (yellow card) 53'; Van der Kust (yellow card) 51'; Gustafson 81' (pen.)	Report	Buitink (yellow card) 51'; Tronstad (yellow card) 60'; Doekhi (yellow card) 74'; Vroegh 85'; Openda (yellow card) 90+2'	Stadium: Stadion Galgenwaard; Attendance: 17,524; Referee: Dennis Higler

22 May 2022 Semi-finals Second leg	Vitesse	3–0 (a.e.t.) (4–3 agg.)	FC Utrecht	Arnhem
18:00 CEST (UTC+2)	Manhoef 39'; Domgjoni (yellow card) 44'; Tronstad 52'; Frederiksen 93', (yellow card) 120+1' (yellow-red card) 120+3'; Hájek (yellow card) 112'; Houwen (yellow card) 117'	Report	Van der Maarel (yellow card) 105+1'	Stadium: GelreDome; Attendance: 13,675; Referee: Allard Lindhout

26 May 2022 Final First leg	Vitesse	2–1	AZ	Arnhem
20:00 CEST (UTC+2)	Buitink 22'; Openda 86'	Report	Clasie 59'	Stadium: GelreDome; Attendance: 17,547; Referee: Pol van Boekel

29 May 2022 Final Second leg	AZ	6–1 (7–3 agg.)	Vitesse	Alkmaar
14:30 CEST (UTC+2)	Pavlidis 3'; Reijnders 13', 52'; De Wit 41'; Karlsson 75', 89'	Report	Bazoer 78'	Stadium: AFAS Stadion; Attendance: 15,222; Referee: Bas Nijhuis

=== KNVB Cup ===
15 December 2021 Second round	Vitesse	2–1	Sparta Rotterdam	Arnhem
19:00 CET(UTC+1)	Baden Frederiksen 42', 80'	Report	Van Crooij 33' (pen.)	Stadium: GelreDome; Referee: Rob Dieperink

18 January 2022 Round of 16	Vitesse	2–0	DVS '33	Arnhem
20:00 CET(UTC+1)	Huisman 22'; Openda 57'	Report		Stadium: GelreDome; Referee: Clay Ruperti

9 February 2022 Quarter-finals	Ajax	5–0	Vitesse	Amsterdam
19:00 CET (UTC+1)	Antony 17', 62'; Haller 30', 46'; Tadić 51'	Report	Wittek (yellow card) 53'	Stadium: Johan Cruyff Arena; Attendance: 15,403; Referee: Bas Nijhuis

=== UEFA Europa Conference League ===
==== Third qualifying round ====
The draw for the third qualifying round was held on 19 July 2021.

5 August 2021 First leg	Vitesse (Netherlands)	2–2	(Republic of Ireland) Dundalk	Arnhem, Netherlands
19:00 CEST (UTC+2)	Bero 20', (yellow card) 79'; Openda 89', (red card) 90'	Report	McEleney (yellow card) 36', (goal) 65', 76'; Abibi (yellow card) 85'; Stanton (yellow card) 90'	Stadium: GelreDome; Referee: Anastasios Papapetrou (Greece)

12 August 2021 Second leg	Dundalk (Republic of Ireland)	1–2 (3–4 agg.)	(Netherlands) Vitesse	Dublin, Ireland
20:00 CEST (UTC+2)	Hoban 71' (pen.), (yellow card) 90+4'; Kelly (yellow card) 78'; McMillan (yellow card) 90+1'; Jurkovskis (yellow card) 90+4'	Report	Bero 28'; Gboho 38'; Tronstad (yellow card) 70'; Manhoef (yellow card) 76'; Von Moos (yellow card) 83'; Oroz (yellow card) 86'; Bazoer (yellow card) 90+4'; Darfalou (yellow card) 90+4'	Stadium: Tallaght Stadium; Referee: Alain Durieux (Luxembourg)
Note: Dundalk played their home match at Tallaght Stadium in Dublin, instead of their regular stadium Oriel Park, Dundalk, which did not meet UEFA requirements.

==== Play-off round ====
The draw for the play-off round was held on 2 August 2021.

19 August 2021 First leg	Anderlecht (Belgium)	3–3	(Netherlands) Vitesse	Anderlecht, Belgium
20:00 CEST (UTC+2)	Raman 10', 32'; Cullen (yellow card) 43'; Verschaeren 90'; Refaelov (penalty missed) 90+4; Thelin (yellow card) 90+7'	Report	Bazoer (yellow card) 24'; Dasa 31', (yellow card) 76'; Bero (yellow card) 36'; Frederiksen 46'; Schubert (yellow card) 66'; Tannane 72', (yellow card) 73'; Darfalou (yellow card) 85'; Wittek (yellow card) 88'; Buitink (yellow card) 89'	Stadium: Constant Vanden Stock Stadium; Referee: Duje Strukan (Croatia)

26 August 2021 Second leg	Vitesse (Netherlands)	2–1 (5–4 agg.)	(Belgium) Anderlecht	Arnhem, Netherlands
19:00 CEST (UTC+2)	Wittek 4', 49'; Bazoer (yellow card) 8'; Schubert (yellow card) 66'; Hajek (yellow card) 71'; Buitink (yellow card) 90+2'	Report	Hoedt (yellow card) 9'; Olsson (yellow card) 29'; Amuzu (yellow card) 66'; Refaelov 80'	Stadium: GelreDome; Referee: Bartosz Frankowski (Poland)

==== Group stage ====
The draw for the group stage was held on 27 August 2021.

Pos	Team	Pld	W	D	L	GF	GA	GD	Pts	Qualification	REN	VIT	TOT	MUR
1	(France) Rennes	6	4	2	0	13	7	+6	14	Advance to round of 16	—	3–3	2–2	1–0
2	(Netherlands) Vitesse	6	3	1	2	12	9	+3	10	Advance to knockout round play-offs	1–2	—	1–0	3–1
3	(England) Tottenham Hotspur	6	2	1	3	11	11	0	7		0–3 (Note: The Tottenham Hotspur v Rennes match was awarded as a 3–0 win to Rennes due to numerous positive COVID-19 tests in the Tottenham Hotspur squad.)	3–2	—	5–1
4	(Slovenia) Mura	6	1	0	5	5	14	−9	3		1–2	0–2	2–1	—

Source: UEFA
Rules for classification: Group stage tiebreakers
Notes:

16 September 2021 1	Mura (Slovenia)	0–2	(Netherlands) Vitesse	Maribor, Slovenia
18:45 CEST (UTC+2)		Report	Tronstad 30'; Doekhi 69'	Stadium: Ljudski vrt Attendance: 3,300; Referee: Mohammed Al-Hakim (Sweden)

30 September 2021 2	Vitesse (Netherlands)	1–2	(France) Rennes	Arnhem, Netherlands
21:00 CEST (UTC+2)	Wittek 30'; Tronstad (yellow card) 47'; Hájek (yellow card) 61'; Openda (yellow card) 68'; Bero (yellow card) 90+2'	Report	Santamaria (yellow card) 9'; Traoré (yellow card) 35'; Bourigeaud (yellow card) 45+1'; Guirassy 54' (pen.); Badé (yellow card) 56' (yellow-red card) 73'; Kamaldeen 70'; Assignon (yellow card) 90+2'	Stadium: GelreDome; Attendance: 14,571; Referee: Kevin Clancy (Scotland)

21 October 2021 3	Vitesse (Netherlands)	1–0	(England) Tottenham Hotspur	Arnhem, Netherlands
18:45 CEST (UTC+2)	Bero (yellow card) 13'; Wittek 78', (yellow card) 81'; Buitink (yellow card) 90'	Report	Bergwijn (yellow card) 41'; Sánchez (yellow card) 72'; Scarlett (yellow card) 74'; Winks (yellow card) 80'	Stadium: GelreDome; Attendance: 23,931; Referee: Harm Osmers (Germany)

4 November 2021 4	Tottenham Hotspur (England)	3–2	(Netherlands) Vitesse	Tottenham, England
20:00 GMT (UTC±0)	Son 15'; Lucas 22'; Rasmussen 28' (o.g.); Romero (yellow card) 37' (yellow-red card) 59'	Report	Rasmussen 32'; Bero 39'; Buitink (yellow card) 63'; Doekhi (yellow card) 76' (yellow-red card) 81'; Bazoer (yellow card) 80'; Schubert (red card) 85'	Stadium: Tottenham Hotspur Stadium; Attendance: 36,312; Referee: Marco Di Bello (Italy)

25 November 2021 5	Rennes (France)	3–3	(Netherlands) Vitesse	Rennes, France
18:45 CET (UTC+1)	Laborde 9', 39', 69'; Omari (yellow card) 82'; Kamaldeen (yellow card) 88'	Report	Rasmussen (yellow card) 34'; Openda (yellow card) 40', (goal) 90'; Huisman 43'; Wittek (yellow card) 68'; Buitink 75'; Bazoer (yellow card) 90'	Stadium: Roazhon Park; Attendance: 23,081; Referee: Espen Eskås (Norway)

9 December 2021 6	Vitesse (Netherlands)	3–1	(Slovenia) Mura	Arnhem, Netherlands
21:00 CET (UTC+1)	Buitink 4'; Openda 35'; Huisman 40'	Report	Maroša 82'	Stadium: GelreDome; Referee: Filip Glova (Slovakia)

==== Knockout round play-offs ====
The draw for the knockout round play-offs was held on 13 December 2021.

17 February 2022 First leg	Rapid Wien (Austria)	2–1	(Netherlands) Vitesse	Vienna, Austria
18:45 CET (UTC+1)	Druijf 1'; Grüll 16'	Report	Openda 74'	Stadium: Allianz Stadion; Attendance: 10,700; Referee: Donatas Rumšas (Lithuania)

24 February 2022 Second leg	Vitesse (Netherlands)	2–0 (3–2 agg.)	(Austria) Rapid Wien	Arnhem, Netherlands
21:00 CET (UTC+1)	Grbic 3'; Bero 19'	Report		Stadium: GelreDome; Attendance: 13,517; Referee: Jakob Kehlet (Denmark)

==== Round of 16 ====
The draw for the round of 16 was held on 25 February 2022.

10 March 2022 First leg	Vitesse (Netherlands)	0–1	(Italy) Roma	Arnhem, Netherlands
18:45 CET (UTC+1)	Oroz (yellow card) 33'	Report	Viña (yellow card) 7'; Oliveira 45+1', (yellow card) 70' (yellow-red card) 79'; Mancini (yellow card) 86'	Stadium: GelreDome; Attendance: 24,022; Referee: Paweł Raczkowski (Poland)

17 March 2022 Second leg	Roma (Italy)	1–1 (2–1 agg.)	(Netherlands) Vitesse	Rome, Italy
21:00 CET (UTC+1)	Ibañez (yellow card) 18'; Zaniolo (yellow card) 72'; El Shaarawy (yellow card) 89'; Abraham 90+1'	Report	Grbić (yellow card) 42'; Rasmussen (yellow card) 58'; Wittek 62'	Stadium: Stadio Olimpico; Referee: Radu Petrescu (Romania)
