= 2022–23 SBV Vitesse season =

SBV Vitesse
2022–23 season
- Owner: Valeriy Oyf
- Chairman: Henk Parren
- Head coach: Thomas Letsch (until 19 September); Phillip Cocu (from 26 September)
- Stadium: GelreDome
- Eredivisie: 10th
- KNVB Cup: First round
- Top goalscorer: League: Million Manhoef (9); All: Million Manhoef (9)
Home colours	Away colours	Third colours

The 2022–23 season was the 130th in the history of SBV Vitesse and their 33rd consecutive season in the top flight. The club participated in Eredivisie and the KNVB Cup.

== Players ==
As of 15 February 2023

Note: Flags indicate national team as defined under FIFA eligibility rules; some limited exceptions apply. Players may hold more than one non-FIFA nationality.

No.	Pos.	Nation	Player
1	GK	GER	Markus Schubert
2	DF	HAI	Carlens Arcus
3	DF	NED	Ryan Flamingo (on loan from Sassuolo)
6	DF	CRO	Alois Oroz
8	MF	NOR	Sondre Tronstad
9	FW	NED	Mohamed Sankoh (on loan from VfB Stuttgart)
10	MF	CRO	Gabriel Vidović (on loan from Bayern Munich)
13	DF	NED	Enzo Cornelisse
14	FW	POL	Bartosz Białek (on loan from VfL Wolfsburg)
15	MF	NED	Marco van Ginkel
16	GK	NED	Kjell Scherpen (on loan from Brighton & Hove Albion)
17	MF	POL	Kacper Kozłowski (on loan from Brighton & Hove Albion)
18	DF	CZE	Tomáš Hájek
19	MF	NED	Davy Pröpper

No.	Pos.	Nation	Player
20	DF	NED	Melle Meulensteen
21	MF	SVK	Matúš Bero (captain)
22	MF	KOS	Toni Domgjoni
24	GK	NED	Jeroen Houwen
25	FW	NED	Gyan de Regt
26	MF	NED	Miliano Jonathans
27	DF	FRA	Romaric Yapi
29	DF	FRA	Nicolas Isimat-Mirin
32	DF	GER	Maximilian Wittek
33	GK	NED	Daan Reiziger
35	DF	NED	Mitchell Dijks
42	DF	NED	Million Manhoef
53	FW	NED	Simon van Duivenbooden
60	GK	NED	Nigel van Haveren

=== Players out on loan ===
Note: Flags indicate national team as defined under FIFA eligibility rules; some limited exceptions apply. Players may hold more than one non-FIFA nationality.

No.	Pos.	Nation	Player
—	MF	NED	Daan Huisman (on loan to VVV-Venlo)
—	FW	DEN	Nikolai Baden Frederiksen (on loan to Ferencváros)

No.	Pos.	Nation	Player
—	FW	NED	Thomas Buitink (on loan to Fortuna Sittard)

== Transfers ==
=== In ===
No.	Pos	Player	Transferred from	Fee	Date	Source
2	DF	(Haiti) Carlens Arcus	(France) AJ Auxerre		1 July 2022	
20	DF	(Netherlands) Melle Meulensteen	(Netherlands) RKC Waalwijk		1 July 2022	
9	FW	(Netherlands) Mohamed Sankoh	(Germany) VfB Stuttgart	Loan	22 July 2022	
14	FW	(Poland) Bartosz Białek	(Germany) VfL Wolfsburg	Loan	29 August 2022	

== Pre-season and friendlies ==
Win Draw Loss Fixtures

8 July 2022 Friendly	Vitesse	0–0	Westerlo	Arnhem
17:00 CEST (UTC+2)		Report		Stadium: Nationaal Sport Centrum Papendal

12 July 2022 Friendly	Vitesse	1–0	Maccabi Haifa	Swolgen
18:00 CEST (UTC+2)	Bero 56' (pen.)			Stadium: Sportpark Sporting Swolgen Tienray

17 July 2022 Friendly	Oostende	2–0	Vitesse	Ostend, Belgium
15:00 CEST (UTC+2)	D'Haese 76'; Sakamoto 80'			Stadium: Diaz Arena

22 July 2022 Friendly	VVV-Venlo	2–2	Vitesse	Horst
15:00 CEST (UTC+2)	Venema 55'; De Boer 76'		Frederiksen 16'; Wittek 74'	Stadium: Sportpark Ter Horst

26 July 2022 Friendly	Vitesse	1–2	OFI	Overbetuwe
19:00 CEST (UTC+2)	Frederiksen 74'	Report	Neira (red card); Tsilianidis 48'; Dioussé 52'	Stadium: RKSV Driel Stadion

30 July 2022 Friendly	Vitesse	1–2	Atromitos	Arnhem
18:30 CEST (UTC+2)	Ferro 79'		Klonaridis 10'; Tzavidas 15'	Stadium: GelreDome

9 December 2022 Friendly	Strasbourg	Cancelled	Vitesse	Portugal
15:30 WET (UTC±0)

15 December 2022 Friendly	Vitesse	Cancelled	Excelsior	Portugal
15:00 WET (UTC±0)

16 December 2022 Friendly	MSV Duisburg	2–1	Vitesse	Duisburg
14:00	Girth 29'; Stoppelkamp 58'		Białek 38'	Stadium: Westender Straße; Attendance: 0

22 December 2022 Friendly	Sparta Rotterdam	1–0	Vitesse	Rotterdam
13:00 CET (UTC+1)				Stadium: Sparta Stadion Het Kasteel

== Competitions ==
=== Overall record ===
Competition	First match	Last match	Starting round	Final position	Record							
Competition	First match	Last match	Starting round	Final position	Pld	W	D	L	GF	GA	GD	Win %
Eredivisie	6 August 2022	28 May 2023	Matchday 1	10th	34	10	10	14	45	50	−5	29.41
KNVB Cup	19 October 2022		First round	First round	1	0	1	0	2	2	+0	0.00
Total					35	10	11	14	47	52	−5	28.57

Source: Soccerway

=== Eredivisie ===
==== League table ====
Pos	Team	Pld	W	D	L	GF	GA	GD	Pts	Qualification or relegation
8	Heerenveen	34	12	10	12	44	50	−6	46	Qualification to European competition play-offs
9	RKC Waalwijk	34	11	8	15	50	64	−14	41	
10	Vitesse	34	10	10	14	45	50	−5	40	
11	Go Ahead Eagles	34	10	10	14	46	56	−10	40	
12	NEC	34	8	15	11	42	45	−3	39	

Source: Eredivisie
Rules for classification: Season in progress: 1) Most points won; 2) Less points lost; 3) Goal difference; 4) Goals scored; 5) Alphabetical order; End of season: 1) Points; 2) Goal difference; 3) Goals scored; 4) Head-to-head points; 5) Head-to-head goal difference; 6) Head-to-head away goals scored; 7) Play-off if relevant for deciding champion, relegation or participating in a European league, otherwise by draw. 8) Penalty shoot-out (only after a play-off)

==== Results summary ====
Overall								Home						Away					
Pld	W	D	L	GF	GA	GD	Pts	W	D	L	GF	GA	GD	W	D	L	GF	GA	GD
34	10	10	14	45	50	−5	40	5	6	6	24	25	−1	5	4	8	21	25	−4

Source: Eredivisie

==== Results by round ====
Round	1	2	3	4	5	6	7	8	9	10	11	12	13	14	15	16	17	18	19	20	21	22	23	24	25	26	27	28	29	30	31	32	33	34
Ground	H	A	H	H	A	A	H	A	H	A	H	A	H	A	A	H	A	H	A	A	H	A	H	H	A	H	A	H	A	H	A	H	H	A
Result	L	L	L	D	W	L	D	L	L	W	W	D	L	D	D	D	L	D	W	D	W	L	L	L	L	D	L	W	W	D	L	W	W	W
Position	17	17	18	16	14	14	14	16	16	15	13	13	15	13	14	14	14	14	13	13	12	13	13	13	13	14	14	13	13	13	13	13	10	10

Source: Eredivisie
A = Away; H = Home; W = Win; D = Draw; L = Loss

==== Matches ====
The league fixtures were announced on 17 June 2022.

7 August 2022 1	Vitesse	2–5	Feyenoord	Arnhem
14:30 CEST(UTC+2)	Manhoef 19'; Tronstad (yellow card) 36'; Ferro (yellow card) 40'; Baden Frederiksen 56'	Report	Wålemark 31'; Danilo 41', 66'; Szymański (yellow card) 45+1'; Dilrosun 61'; Geertruida 69'	Stadium: GelreDome; Attendance: 14,416; Referee: Jochem Kamphuis

12 August 2022 2	Excelsior	3–1	Vitesse	Rotterdam
14:30 CEST(UTC+2)	Kharchouch 14', 20'; Goudmijn 76'	Report	Frederiksen 29'; Tronstad (red card) 90+7'	Stadium: Stadion Woudestein; Attendance: 4.234; Referee: Alex Bos

20 August 2022 3	Vitesse	0–4	SC Heerenveen	Arnhem
16:30 CEST(UTC+2)	Domgjoni (yellow card) 36'; Wittek (yellow card) 43'; Bero (yellow card) 86'	Report	van Hooijdonk 5', 72', 77'; Tahiri (yellow card) 36'; A. Sarr 45+3'; Thom Haye (yellow card) 69'	Stadium: GelreDome; Attendance: 10.899; Referee: Joey Kooij

27 August 2022 4	Vitesse	2–2	RKC Waalwijk	Arnhem
18:45 CEST(UTC+2)	Bero 61' (pen.); Flamingo 71'; Yapi (yellow card) 73'	Report	Jozefzoon 35'; Oukili (yellow card) 45'; Bel Hassani 50'	Stadium: GelreDome; Attendance: 10,598; Referee: Pol van Boekel

4 September 2022 5	Groningen	0–1	Vitesse	Groningen
16:45 CEST (UTC+2)	Valente (yellow card) 79'	Report	Bero 77'; Flamingo (yellow card) 82'; Arcus (yellow card) 90+1'	Stadium: Euroborg; Attendance: 18,014; Referee: Serdar Gözübüyük

11 September 2022 6	Utrecht	1–0	Vitesse	Utrecht
12:15	Dost 84'			Stadium: Stadion Galgenwaard; Referee: Bas Nijhuis

17 September 2022 7	Vitesse	1–1	Volendam	Arnhem
18:45	Białek 48'		Mühren 21'	Stadium: GelreDome; Referee: Erwin Blank

1 October 2022 8	Twente	3–0	Vitesse	Enschede
21:00	Brenet 37'; Misidjan 74'; Smal 90+3'			Stadium: De Grolsch Veste; Referee: Danny Makkelie

9 October 2022 9	Vitesse	1–2	Fortuna Sittard	Arnhem
20:00				Stadium: GelreDome; Referee: Jeroen Manschot

15 October 2022 10	Cambuur	0–3	Vitesse	Leeuwarden
21:00				Stadium: Cambuur Stadion; Referee: Laurens Gerrets

22 October 2022 11	Vitesse	2–1	Emmen	Arnhem
				Stadium: GelreDome

5 November 2022 13	Vitesse	0–4	Sparta Rotterdam	Arnhem
				Stadium: GelreDome

9 November 2022 12	Ajax	2–2	Vitesse	Amsterdam

13 November 2022 14	Go Ahead Eagles	2–2	Vitesse	Deventer

7 January 2023 15	AZ	1–1	Vitesse	Alkmaar

15 January 2023 16	Vitesse	0–0	NEC	Arnhem
				Stadium: GelreDome

21 January 2023 17	PSV	1–0	Vitesse	Eindhoven

25 January 2023 18	Vitesse	2–2	Twente	Arnhem
				Stadium: GelreDome

28 January 2023 19	Heerenveen	1–3	Vitesse	Heerenveen

4 February 2023 20	Emmen	2–2	Vitesse	Emmen

12 February 2023 21	Vitesse	2–0	Utrecht	Arnhem
				Stadium: GelreDome

18 February 2023 22	Volendam	2–0	Vitesse	Volendam

26 February 2023 23	Vitesse	1–2	Ajax	Arnhem
				Stadium: GelreDome

3 March 2023 24	Vitesse	0–1	AZ	Arnhem
				Stadium: GelreDome

11 March 2023 25	Sparta Rotterdam	3–1	Vitesse	Rotterdam

19 March 2023 26	Vitesse	1–1	PSV	Arnhem
				Stadium: GelreDome

1 April 2023 27	RKC Waalwijk	1–0	Vitesse	Waalwijk

8 April 2023 28	Vitesse	2–0	Go Ahead Eagles	Arnhem
				Stadium: GelreDome

16 April 2023 29	NEC	1–4	Vitesse	Nijmegen

22 April 2023 30	Vitesse	0–0	Excelsior	Arnhem
				Stadium: GelreDome

7 May 2023 31	Fortuna Sittard	2–0	Vitesse	Sittard

14 May 2023 32	Vitesse	2–0	Cambuur	Arnhem
				Stadium: GelreDome

21 May 2023 33	Vitesse	6–0	Groningen	Arnhem
				Stadium: GelreDome

28 May 2023 34	Feyenoord	0–1	Vitesse	Rotterdam

=== KNVB Cup ===
19 October 2022	Kozakken Boys	2–2 (a.e.t.) (5–4 p)	Vitesse	Werkendam
20:00 CEST	Hutten 45+2'; Van Zundert 82'	Report	14' Białek; 67' Kozłowski	Stadium: De Zwaaier
	Penalties
	Lommers (penalty scored); Altintas (penalty scored); Van Ingen (penalty scored); Stout (penalty scored); Ramsteijn (penalty scored)		(penalty scored) Kozlowski; (penalty scored) Tronstad; (penalty scored) Białek; (penalty missed) Meulensteen; (penalty scored) Baden Frederiksen
