= Daan Reiziger =

Dutch footballer (born 2001)

Personal information
- Date of birth: 18 June 2001 (age 25)
- Place of birth: Groningen, Netherlands
- Height: 1.84 m (6 ft 0 in)
- Position: Goalkeeper

Team information
- Current team: Telstar
- Number: 20

Youth career
- 2006–2012: Be Quick 1887
- 2012–2016: FC Groningen
- 2016–2019: Ajax

Senior career*
Years	Team	Apps	(Gls)
2019–2021	Jong Ajax	9	(0)
2021–2023	Vitesse	8	(0)
2023–2025	Cambuur	3	(0)
2025–	Telstar	2	(0)

International career
2017	Netherlands U16	4	(0)
2017–2018	Netherlands U17	2	(0)
2018	Netherlands U18	4	(0)
2018–2019	Netherlands U19	1	(0)
- * Club domestic league appearances and goals as of 18:21, 13 February 2026 (UTC)

Daan Reiziger (born 18 June 2001) is a Dutch professional footballer who plays as a goalkeeper for Eredivisie club Telstar.

== Club career ==
=== Ajax ===
Born in Groningen, Reiziger began his youth career at local club Be Quick 1887, before moving to the youth academy of FC Groningen in 2012. In 2016, Reiziger moved to Ajax. He signed a three-year contract extension with the club in December 2017. He was part of the under-17 team in the 2016–17 and 2017–18 seasons, before being promoted to the under-19 team. On 26 January 2019, Reiziger scored the 1–1 equaliser in a U19 Cup match against NAC.

On 3 March 2020, Reiziger was brought on by head coach Johnny Heitinga as a 90th-minute substitute for the penalty shootout in a UEFA Youth League round of 16 match against Atlético Madrid. He saved three of the penalties he faced as Ajax won 6–5, with Reiziger scoring on the deciding penalty kick.

Reiziger played his first professional game for Jong Ajax on 19 March 2021, as a starter in a 4–3 win over MVV.

He made an appearance on the bench for the senior team, but was an unused substitute in a 3–1 win over VVV-Venlo on 13 May 2021.

=== Vitesse ===
On 20 May 2021, it was announced that Reiziger would sign with Eredivisie club Vitesse on a three-year contract.

He made his debut on 4 September 2022, replacing the injured Kjell Scherpen in Vitesse's starting lineup against FC Groningen, and keeping a clean sheet in a 1–0 away win.

=== Cambuur ===
On 1 September 2023, Reiziger signed a two-year contract with Cambuur. He made his competitive debut for the club on 22 September, starting in place of the injured Yanick van Osch in a 3–2 defeat to Jong Utrecht in the Eerste Divisie.

While also appearing for the club's reserve side, Jong Cambuur, Reiziger scored a notable goal during a cup match against Dordrecht in January 2025. With Cambuur trailing late in the match, he joined an attacking phase and scored from outside the penalty area to equalise. Despite the goal, Jong Cambuur were eliminated after a penalty shoot-out.

=== Telstar ===
On 15 July 2025, Reiziger signed a two-year contract, with an option for a further year, with newly promoted Eredivisie club Telstar.

== International career ==
Reiziger has represented Netherlands at youth international levels from under-16 to under-19.

== Career statistics ==
As of match played 8 February 2026

Appearances and goals by club, season and competition
Club	Season	League			Cup		Other		Total	
Club	Season	Division	Apps	Goals	Apps	Goals	Apps	Goals	Apps	Goals
Jong Ajax	2020–21	Eerste Divisie	9	0	—		—		9	0
Vitesse	2021–22	Eredivisie	0	0	0	0	—		0	0
Vitesse	2022–23	Eredivisie	8	0	1	0	—		9	0
Vitesse	Total		8	0	1	0	—		9	0
Cambuur	2023–24	Eerste Divisie	2	0	0	0	—		2	0
Cambuur	2024–25	Eerste Divisie	1	0	2	0	—		3	0
Cambuur	Total		3	0	2	0	—		5	0
Telstar	2025–26	Eredivisie	2	0	1	0	—		3	0
Career total			22	0	4	0	0	0	26	0
