= Markus Schubert =

German association football player

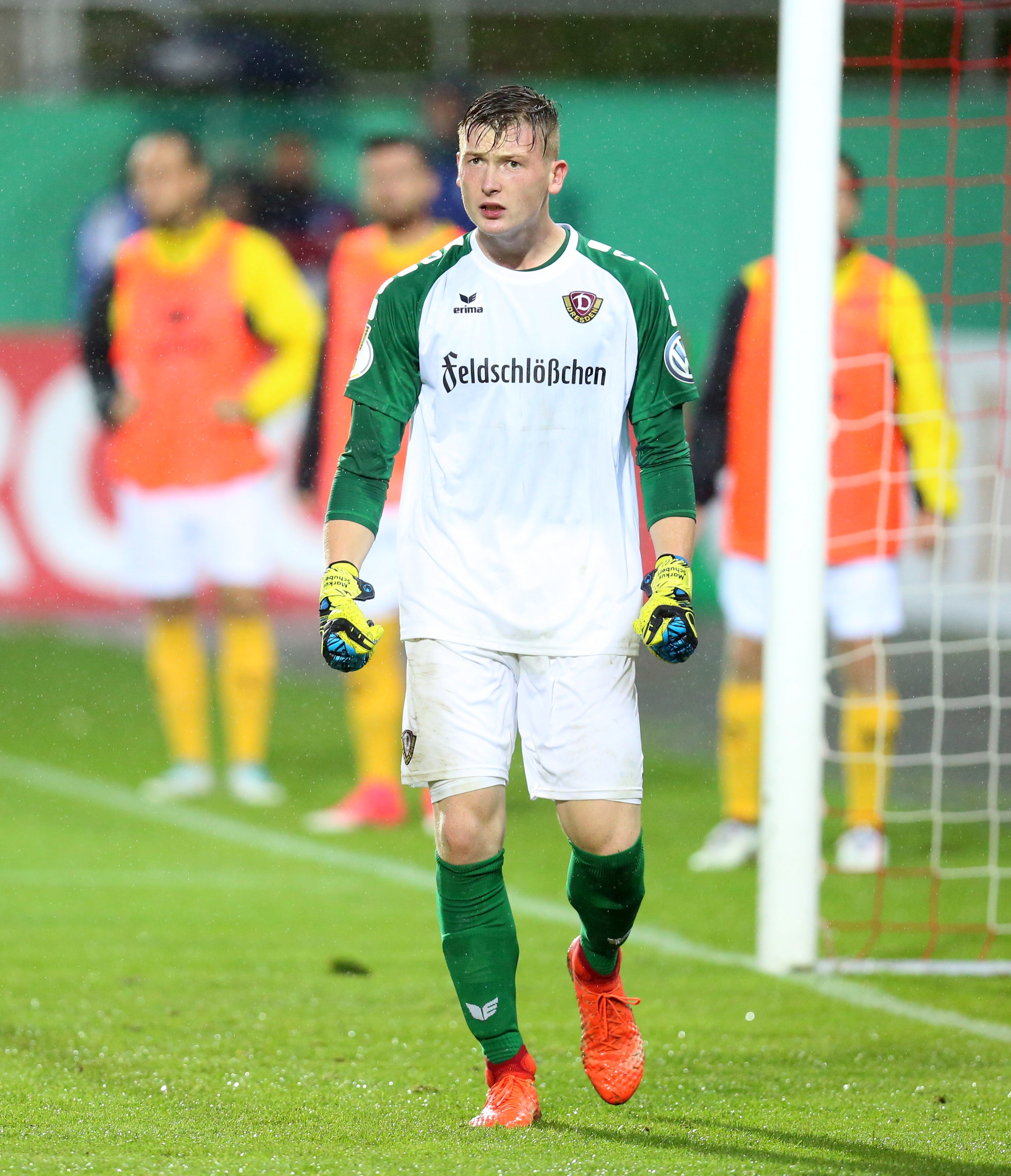
- Schubert with Dynamo Dresden in 2017

Personal information
- Date of birth: 12 June 1998 (age 28)
- Place of birth: Freiberg, Germany
- Height: 1.87 m (6 ft 2 in)
- Position: Goalkeeper

Team information
- Current team: SC Paderborn
- Number: 30

Youth career
- 2004–2008: SV Lok Nossen
- 2008–2011: Riesaer SC
- 2011–2017: Dynamo Dresden

Senior career*
Years	Team	Apps	(Gls)
2015–2019	Dynamo Dresden	41	(0)
2019–2021	Schalke 04	9	(0)
2020	Schalke 04 II	2	(0)
2020–2021	→ Eintracht Frankfurt (loan)	0	(0)
2021–2024	Vitesse	21	(0)
2024–	SC Paderborn	12	(0)

International career
2015	Germany U17	2	(0)
2015–2016	Germany U18	4	(0)
2016–2017	Germany U19	7	(0)
2017–2019	Germany U20	5	(0)
2018–2021	Germany U21	6	(0)
Medal record
Representing Germany
UEFA European Under-21 Championship
Winner	2021
Runner-up	2019
- * Club domestic league appearances and goals as of 23 May 2025

Markus Schubert (born 12 June 1998) is a German professional footballer who plays as a goalkeeper for Bundesliga club SC Paderborn.

== Club career ==
=== Dynamo Dresden ===
Starting in 2015–16, Schubert joined the main Dynamo Dresden squad, becoming the youngest active player in the club's history after debuting in a game against Preußen Münster on 28 November 2015. He was made Dresden's main goalkeeper in 2018–19, appearing full-time in all league matches except for the last three. The decision to not field Schubert in those matches was made by then-coach Cristian Fiel in an effort to "protect" him from hostile behaviour directed at him by supporters, following the announcement of his departure from the club.

=== Schalke 04 ===
On 5 July 2019, Schubert joined Schalke 04 on a four-year contract.

On 15 December 2019, he made his Bundesliga debut in a 1–0 home win against Eintracht Frankfurt when he came on for Amine Harit in the 69th minute after goalkeeper Alexander Nübel received a red card. Following a string of poor performances by Nübel, who had already announced his move to Bayern Munich, he was permanently replaced by Schubert, who spent the rest of the season as Schalke's main goalkeeper. Prior to the 2020–2021 season, he was demoted to substitute keeper, with coach David Wagner electing to field Ralf Fährmann instead, who had previously been out on a loan.

On 30 September 2020, he joined Eintracht Frankfurt on a year-long loan. Schalke, in turn, loaned Frederik Rønnow from Frankfurt, who took Schubert's place and went on to become the club's primary goalkeeper for the season.

=== Vitesse ===
On 14 July 2021, Schubert signed for three years with Vitesse.

=== Paderborn ===
On 27 May 2024, Schubert signed with 2. Bundesliga club SC Paderborn for the 2024–25 season.

== International career ==
Schubert has represented Germany at every age group from under-17 to under-21.

== Career statistics ==
=== Club ===
As of match played 28 October 2026

Appearances and goals by club, season and competition
Club	Season	League			Cup		Europe		Other		Total	
Club	Season	Division	Apps	Goals	Apps	Goals	Apps	Goals	Apps	Goals	Apps	Goals
Dynamo Dresden	2015–16	3. Liga	1	0	0	0	—		—		1	0
Dynamo Dresden	2016–17	2. Bundesliga	0	0	0	0	—		—		0	0
Dynamo Dresden	2017–18	2. Bundesliga	9	0	1	0	—		—		10	0
Dynamo Dresden	2018–19	2. Bundesliga	31	0	1	0	—		—		32	0
Dynamo Dresden	Total		41	0	2	0	—		—		43	0
Schalke 04	2019–20	Bundesliga	9	0	1	0	—		—		10	0
Eintracht Frankfurt (loan)	2020–21	Bundesliga	0	0	0	0	—		—		0	0
Vitesse	2021–22	Eredivisie	21	0	0	0	8	0	—		29	0
Vitesse	2022–23	Eredivisie	0	0	0	0	—		—		0	0
Vitesse	2023–24	Eredivisie	0	0	4	0	—		—		4	0
Vitesse	Total		21	0	4	0	8	0	—		33	0
SC Paderborn	2024–25	2. Bundesliga	12	0	2	0	—		—		14	0
SC Paderborn	2025–26	2. Bundesliga	0	0	2	0	—		0	0	2	0
SC Paderborn	2026–27	Bundesliga	0	0	2	0	—		—		2	0
SC Paderborn	Total		12	0	6	0	—		0	0	18	0
Career total			83	0	13	0	8	0	0	0	104	0

== Honours ==
Germany U21

- UEFA European Under-21 Championship: 2021; runner-up: 2019
