= Dominik Oroz =

Croatian footballer (born 2000)

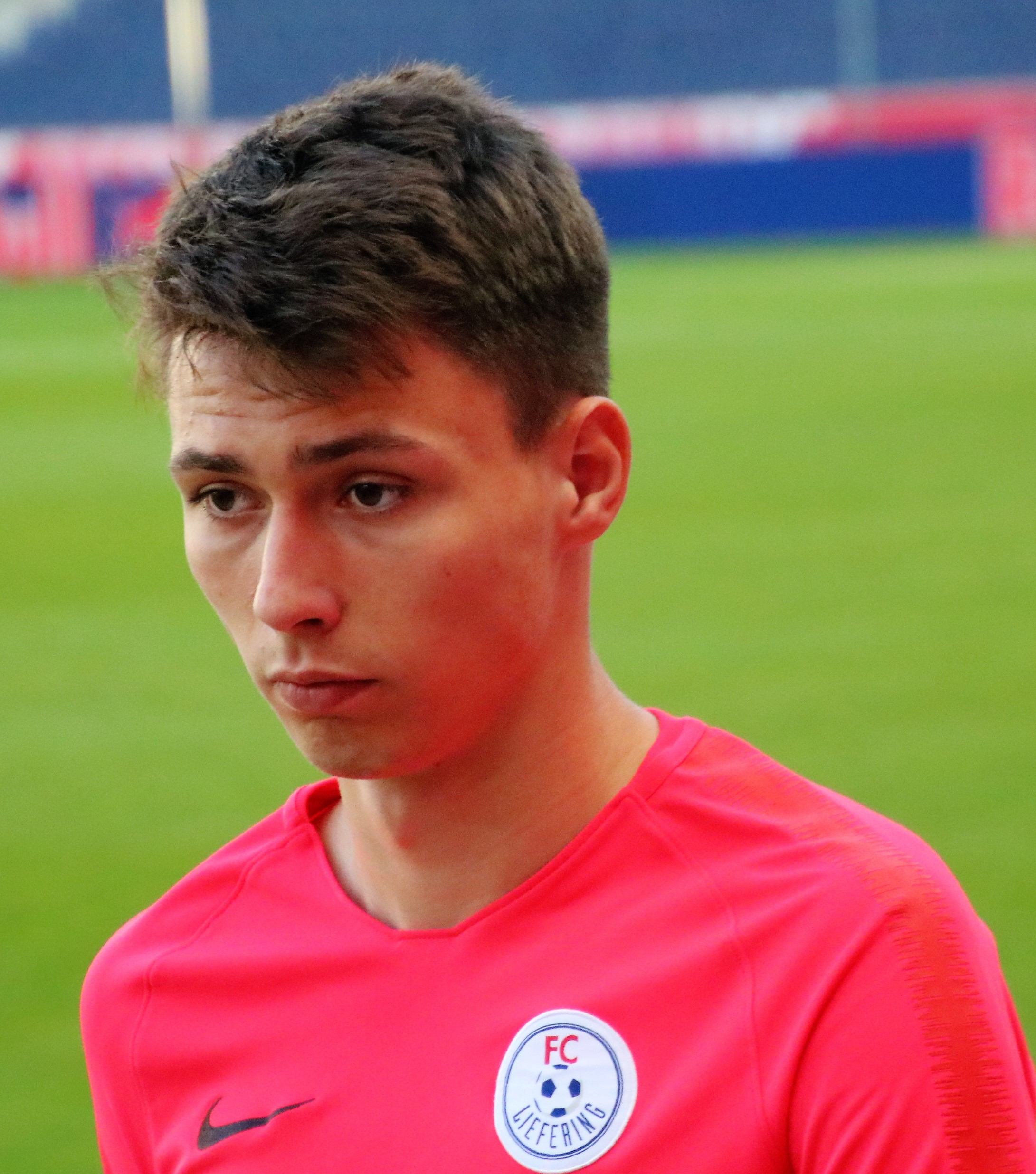
- Oroz with FC Liefering in 2019

Personal information
- Full name: Alois Dominik Oroz
- Date of birth: 29 October 2000 (age 26)
- Place of birth: Vienna, Austria
- Height: 1.92 m (6 ft 4 in)
- Position: Centre-back

Team information
- Current team: Krylia Sovetov Samara
- Number: 5

Youth career
- 2006–2007: Wiener Sport-Club
- 2007–2013: Austria Wien
- 2013–2017: First Vienna
- 2017–2020: Red Bull Salzburg

Senior career*
Years	Team	Apps	(Gls)
2017	First Vienna II	10	(3)
2017	First Vienna	2	(0)
2018–2021	Liefering	48	(3)
2021–2024	Vitesse	71	(5)
2022	→ Sturm Graz (loan)	2	(0)
2022	→ Sturm Graz II (loan)	7	(0)
2024–	Krylia Sovetov Samara	46	(5)

International career
2018	Croatia U18	2	(0)
2018–2019	Croatia U19	6	(0)
2021	Croatia U20	2	(0)
- * Club domestic league appearances and goals as of 20 November 2026

Alois Dominik Oroz (born 29 October 2000) is a professional footballer who plays as a centre-back for Russian club Krylia Sovetov Samara. Born in Austria, he represented Croatia internationally on junior levels.

== Club career ==
In 2006, Oroz began his career at Wiener Sport-Club, before moving to Austria Wien in 2007. In 2015, he moved to the youth team of First Vienna FC. In February 2017 he made his debut for First Vienna II versus Nussdorfer AC in the fifth league. In 2017 he made his first match for First Vienna in the third league as he came on in the 77th minute for Mehmet Sütcü versus SC-ESV Parndorf 1919.

In the 2017–18 season he moved to FC Red Bull Salzburg where he played in the academy team. In the 2018–19 season he played for FC Liefering where he debuted in February 2018 versus SV Horn.

In January 2021 he left Liefering and went to the Dutch football club Vitesse.

On 6 July 2022, Oroz returned to Austria and joined Sturm Graz on a season-long loan with an option to buy. On 2 December 2022, the loan was terminated early.

On 24 August 2024, Oroz signed a three-year contract with Russian Premier League club Krylia Sovetov Samara. On his league debut for Krylia Sovetov on 23 September 2024 against Akhmat Grozny, Oroz scored an added-time equalizer in a 1–1 draw.

== International career ==
Oroz has represented Croatia in the U18 and U19 national team.

== Career statistics ==
As of match played 20 November 2026

Appearances and goals by club, season and competition
Club	Season	League			Cup		Europe		Total	
Club	Season	Division	Apps	Goals	Apps	Goals	Apps	Goals	Apps	Goals
First Vienna	2016–17	Austrian Regionalliga East	2	0	—		—		2	0
Liefering	2018–19	2. Liga	12	0	—		—		12	0
Liefering	2019–20	2. Liga	23	0	—		—		23	0
Liefering	2020–21	2. Liga	13	3	—		—		13	3
Liefering	Total		48	3	—		—		48	3
Vitesse	2020–21	Eredivisie	7	1	0	0	—		7	1
Vitesse	2021–22	Eredivisie	21	3	3	0	11 (Note: Appearances in UEFA Conference League)	0	35	3
Vitesse	2022–23	Eredivisie	16	1	0	0	—		16	1
Vitesse	2023–24	Eredivisie	27	1	4	1	—		31	2
Vitesse	Total		71	6	7	1	11	0	89	7
Sturm Graz (loan)	2022–23	Austrian Bundesliga	2	0	1	0	2 (Note: Appearances in UEFA Europa League)	0	5	0
Sturm Graz II (loan)	2022–23	2. Liga	7	0	—		—		7	0
Krylya Sovetov Samara	2024–25	Russian Premier League	14	4	1	0	—		15	4
Krylya Sovetov Samara	2025–26	Russian Premier League	20	0	4	0	—		24	0
Krylya Sovetov Samara	2026–27	Russian Premier League	12	1	5	0	—		17	1
Krylya Sovetov Samara	Total		46	5	10	0	0	0	56	5
Career total			176	14	18	1	13	0	207	15

== Honours ==
Sturm Graz

- Austrian Cup: 2022–23
