= Romaric Yapi =

French footballer (born 2000)

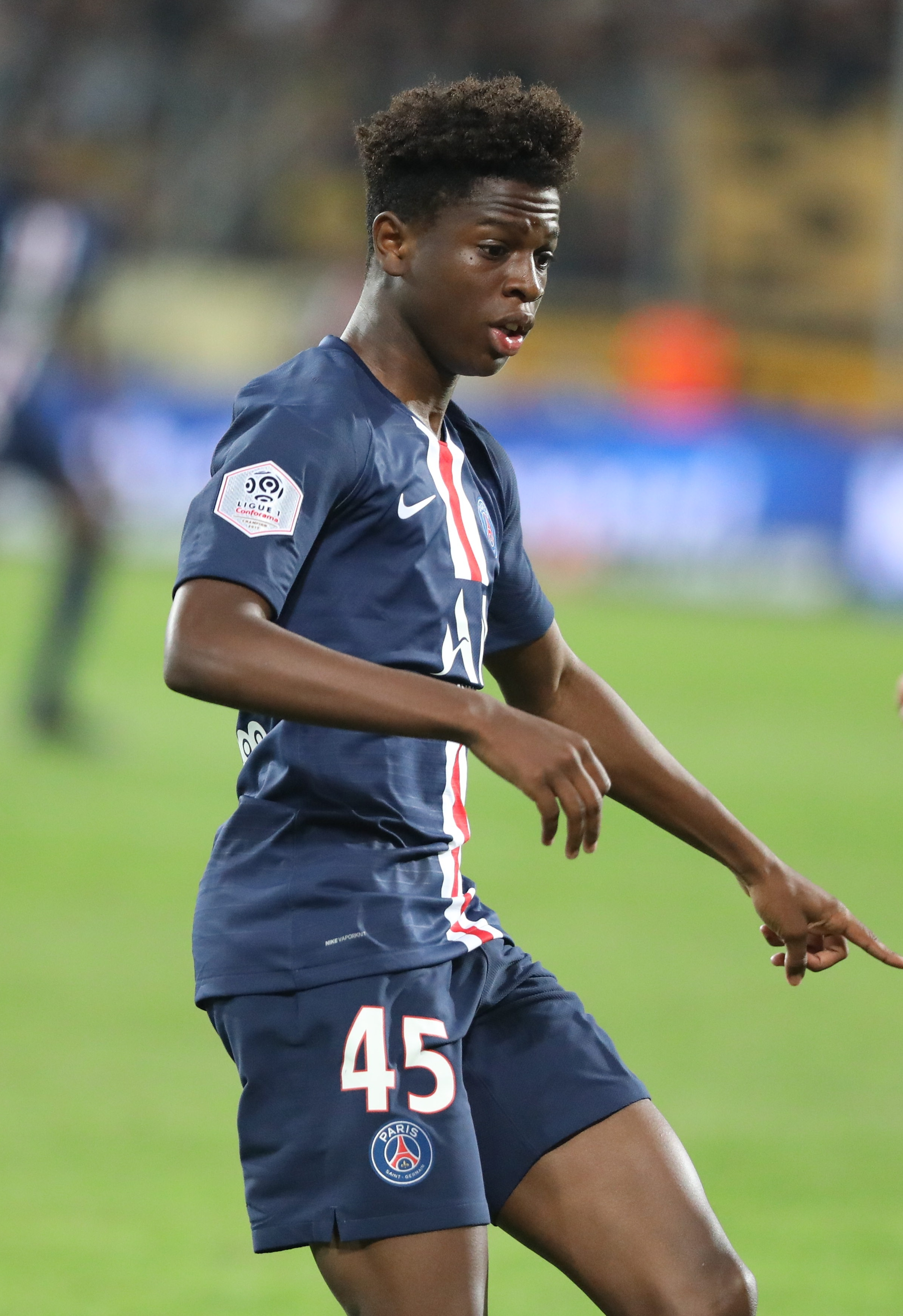
- Yapi with Paris Saint-Germain in 2019

Personal information
- Full name: Romaric Yapi
- Date of birth: 13 July 2000 (age 26)
- Place of birth: Évry, France
- Height: 1.81 m (5 ft 11 in)
- Position: Right back

Team information
- Current team: Lahti
- Number: 27

Youth career
- –2019: Paris Saint-Germain

Senior career*
Years	Team	Apps	(Gls)
2018–2019	Paris Saint-Germain B	3	(0)
2019–2021	Brighton & Hove Albion	0	(0)
2021–2023	Vitesse	27	(0)
2023–2024	Bastia	12	(0)
2024–2025	DAC Dunajská Streda	30	(2)
2026–	Lahti	23	(0)
- * Club domestic league appearances and goals as of 13 November 2026

Romaric Yapi (born 13 July 2000) is a French professional footballer who plays as a defender for Veikkausliiga club Lahti.

== Career ==
=== Paris Saint-Germain ===
Yapi is a product of the Paris Saint-Germain Academy. He played in Thiago Motta's U19 team in his last year at the Parisian club before joining the academy of Brighton & Hove Albion in England. Yapi never made a professional appearance for Paris Saint-Germain, but participated in a friendly match against Dynamo Dresden on 17 July 2019.

=== Brighton & Hove Albion ===
On 25 September 2019, Yapi made his professional debut for Brighton & Hove Albion in a 3–1 home defeat against Aston Villa in the EFL Cup in what ultimately was his only appearance for the senior side.

=== Vitesse ===
Yapi signed for Eredivisie side Vitesse on 11 July 2021 after two years in England. He made his debut on 15 August in the opening game of the 2021–22 season, coming on as an 86th-minute substitute to help close out the game in a 1–0 away victory at PEC Zwolle. He made his first start and home debut a week later in a 3–0 loss against Willem II.

=== Bastia ===
On 1 September 2023, Yapi signed a three-year contract with Bastia in Ligue 2.

=== DAC Dunajská Streda ===
On 2 February 2024, Yapi joined DAC Dunajská Streda in Slovakia on a two-and-a-half-year contract.

== Personal life ==
Yapi was born in Niamey in the South region of Niger. He is of Ivorian origin.

== Career statistics ==
As of 13 November 2026

Appearances and goals by club, season and competition
Club	Season	League			Domestic Cup		League Cup		Europe		Other		Total	
Club	Season	Division	Apps	Goals	Apps	Goals	Apps	Goals	Apps	Goals	Apps	Goals	Apps	Goals
Paris Saint-Germain B	2017–18	Championnat National 2	2	0	—		—		—		—		2	0
Paris Saint-Germain B	2018–19	Championnat National 2	1	0	—		—		—		—		1	0
Paris Saint-Germain B	Total		3	0	0	0	0	0	0	0	0	0	3	0
Brighton & Hove Albion	2019–20	Premier League	0	0	0	0	1	0	—		—		1	0
Brighton & Hove Albion U23	2019–20	—			—		—		—		3 (Note: Appearance(s) in the EFL Trophy)	0	3	0
Brighton & Hove Albion U23	2020–21	—			—		—		—		1	0	1	0
Brighton & Hove Albion U23	Total		—		—		—		—		4	0	4	0
Vitesse	2021–22	Eredivisie	11	0	2	0	—		3 (Note: Appearances in UEFA Europa Conference League)	0	3 (Note: Appearances in Dutch UEFA Europa League play-offs)	0	15	0
Vitesse	2022–23	Eredivisie	16	0	0	0	—		—		—		15	0
Vitesse	Total		27	0	2	0	0	0	3	0	3	0	35	0
Bastia	2023–24	Ligue 2	16	0	0	0	—		—		—		15	0
DAC Dunajská Streda	2023–24	Slovak First Football League	8	1	1	0	—		—		—		9	1
DAC Dunajská Streda	2024–25	Slovak First Football League	22	1	4	0	—		2 (Note: Appearances in UEFA Conference League)	0	2 (Note: Appearances in Slovak Europe Playoff)	0	30	1
DAC Dunajská Streda	Total		30	2	5	0	0	0	2	0	2	0	39	2
Lahti	2026	Veikkausliiga	23	0	3	0	4	0	—		—		30	0
Career total			83	2	10	0	5	0	5	0	9	0	112	2
