= Adrian Grbić =

Austrian footballer

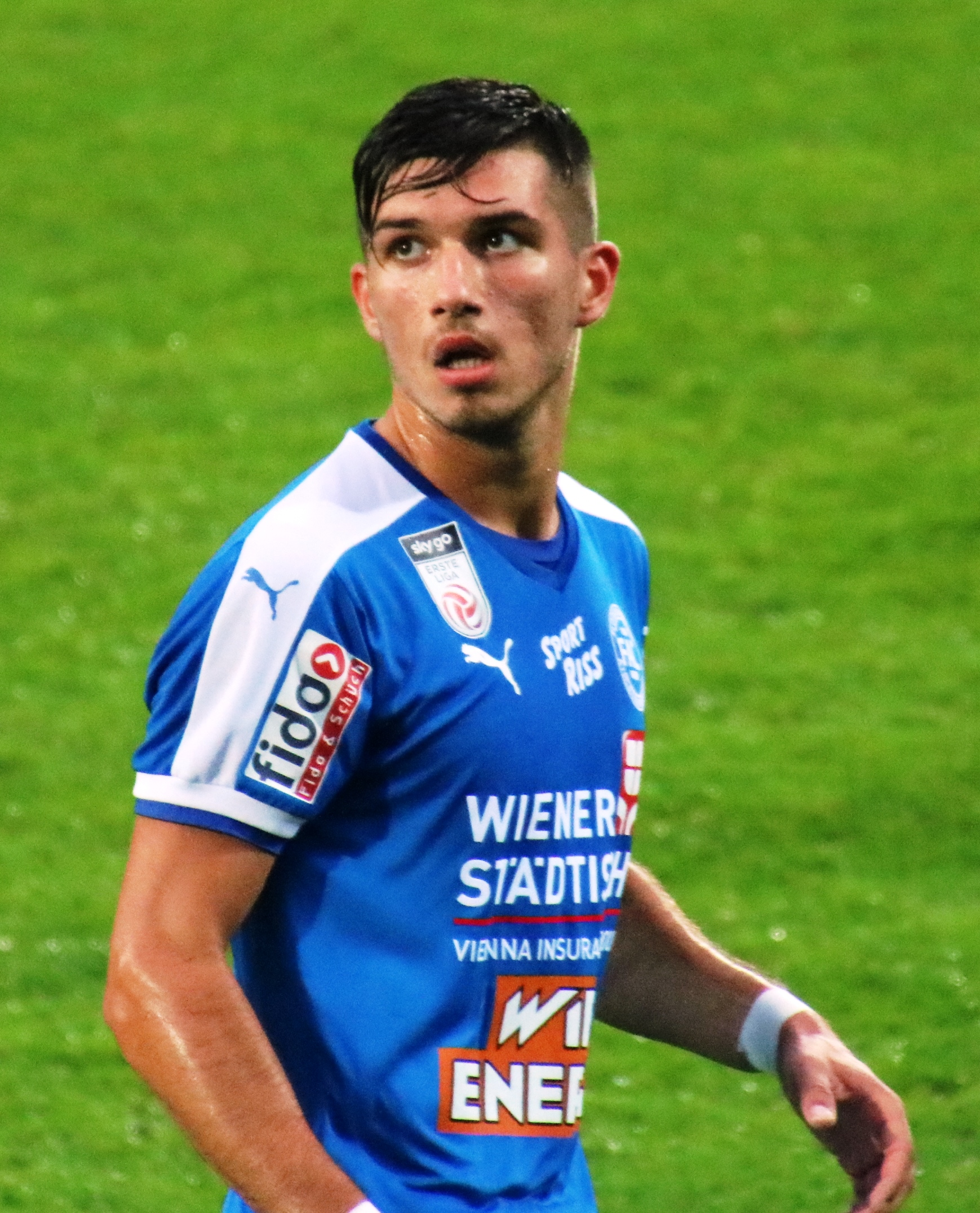
- Grbić with Floridsdorfer AC in 2016

Personal information
- Date of birth: 4 August 1996 (age 30)
- Place of birth: Vienna, Austria
- Height: 1.88 m (6 ft 2 in)
- Position: Forward

Team information
- Current team: Luzern
- Number: 9

Youth career
- 2002–2004: SC Wiener Viktoria
- 2004–2012: Rapid Wien
- 2012–2015: VfB Stuttgart

Senior career*
Years	Team	Apps	(Gls)
2015–2016	VfB Stuttgart II	15	(0)
2016–2017	Floridsdorfer AC	27	(5)
2017–2019	SCR Altach	42	(11)
2019–2020	Clermont	26	(17)
2020–2024	Lorient	52	(5)
2022	→ Vitesse (loan)	16	(0)
2023	→ Valenciennes (loan)	14	(9)
2024	→ Luzern (loan)	14	(4)
2024–	Luzern	57	(15)

International career
2011	Austria U16	3	(0)
2012–2013	Austria U17	25	(10)
2014	Austria U18	3	(2)
2014–2015	Austria U19	9	(0)
2017–2019	Austria U21	19	(5)
2020–2021	Austria	9	(4)
- * Club domestic league appearances and goals as of 26 May 2026

Adrian Grbić (born 4 August 1996) is an Austrian professional footballer who plays as a forward for Swiss Super League club Luzern.

== Club career ==
On 8 July 2020, Grbić signed a five-year contract with Ligue 1 club Lorient. The deal was reportedly worth around €10 million. He scored a goal from a penalty on his debut with Lorient in a 3–1 victory against Strasbourg on 23 August 2020. On 11 January 2022, Grbić signed for Dutch club Vitesse on loan until the end of the 2021–22 season. On 31 January 2023, Grbić was loaned to Valenciennes in Ligue 2 for the rest of the season.

On 6 February 2024, Grbić moved on loan to Luzern in Switzerland, with an option to buy. On 31 August 2024, Grbić returned to Luzern signing a three-year contract.

== International career ==
Grbić was born in Austria and is of Croatian descent. On 4 September 2020, he debuted for the Austria national football team in a 2020–21 UEFA Nations League match against Norway.

== Career statistics ==
As of match played 31 March 2021

Appearances and goals by national team and year
National team	Year	Apps	Goals
Austria	2020	7	4
Austria	2021	2	0
Total		9	4

Scores and results list Austria's goal tally first, score column indicates score after each Grbić goal.

List of international goals scored by Adrian Grbić
No.	Date	Venue	Opponent	Score	Result	Competition
1	7 October 2020	Wörthersee Stadion, Klagenfurt, Austria	Greece	1–1	2–1	Friendly
2	11 November 2020	Stade Josy Barthel, Luxembourg, Luxembourg	Luxembourg	2–0	3–0	Friendly
3	15 November 2020	Ernst-Happel-Stadion, Vienna, Austria	Northern Ireland	2–1	2–1	2020–21 UEFA Nations League B
4	18 November 2020	Ernst-Happel-Stadion, Vienna, Austria	Norway	1–1	1–1	2020–21 UEFA Nations League B
