= Maximilian Wittek =

German footballer

Personal information
- Date of birth: 21 August 1995 (age 31)
- Place of birth: Freising, Germany
- Height: 1.70 m (5 ft 7 in)
- Positions: Left-back; left wing-back

Team information
- Current team: VfL Bochum
- Number: 32

Youth career
- –2013: 1860 Munich

Senior career*
Years	Team	Apps	(Gls)
2013–2015	1860 Munich II	7	(0)
2014–2017	1860 Munich	72	(1)
2017–2020	Greuther Fürth	84	(5)
2020–2023	Vitesse	89	(4)
2023–	VfL Bochum	86	(3)

International career^{‡}
2014–2016	Germany U20	15	(0)
- * Club domestic league appearances and goals as of 28 August 2026 ‡ National team caps and goals as of 07:11, 20 August 2020 (UTC)

Maximilian Wittek (born 21 August 1995) is a German professional footballer who plays as a left-back or left wing-back for 2. Bundesliga club VfL Bochum.

== Club career ==
Wittek is a youth exponent from 1860 Munich. He made his 2. Bundesliga debut on 10 August 2014 against RB Leipzig in a 3–0 home defeat. He played the first half, before being substituted for Marin Tomasov at half-time. Wittek scored his first professional goal on 13 December 2014 in 3–2 defeat against Karlsruhe.

In June 2017, Wittek joined SpVgg Greuther Fürth signing a three-year contract.

On 14 August 2023, Wittek moved to VfL Bochum on a three-year contract.

== International career ==
On 9 October 2014, Wittek made his debut for Germany U20 in a 0–1 home defeat against England.

== Career statistics ==
As of 28 August 2026

Appearances and goals by club, season and competition
Club	Season	League			DFB-Pokal		Europe		Other (Note: Includes other competitive competitions, including the DFL-Supercup, UEFA Super Cup, FIFA Club World Cup and Relegation Playoffs.)		Total	
Club	Season	Division	Apps	Goals	Apps	Goals	Apps	Goals	Apps	Goals	Apps	Goals
1860 Munich II	2013–14	Regionalliga Bayern	2	0	—		—		—		2	0
1860 Munich II	2014–15	Regionalliga Bayern	5	0	—		—		—		5	0
1860 Munich II	Total		7	0	0	0	0	0	0	0	7	0
1860 Munich	2014–15	2. Bundesliga	20	1	0	0	—		2	0	22	1
1860 Munich	2015–16	2. Bundesliga	27	0	3	0	—		—		30	0
1860 Munich	2016–17	2. Bundesliga	25	0	3	0	—		1	0	29	0
1860 Munich	Total		72	1	6	0	0	0	3	0	81	1
Greuther Fürth	2017–18	2. Bundesliga	33	4	2	0	—		—		35	4
Greuther Fürth	2018–19	2. Bundesliga	23	0	1	0	—		—		24	0
Greuther Fürth	2019–20	2. Bundesliga	28	1	1	0	—		—		29	1
Greuther Fürth	Total		84	5	4	0	0	0	0	0	88	5
Vitesse	2020–21	Eredivisie	32	1	5	0	—		—		37	1
Vitesse	2021–22	Eredivisie	25	0	3	0	14 (Note: Appearances in UEFA Europa Conference League)	5	—		42	5
Vitesse	2022–23	Eredivisie	31	3	0	0	—		—		31	3
Vitesse	2023–24	Eredivisie	1	0	0	0	—		—		1	0
Vitesse	Total		89	4	8	0	14	5	0	0	111	9
Bochum	2023–24	Bundesliga	21	3	2	0	—		2 (Note: Appearances in Bundesliga Relegation Playoffs)	0	25	3
Bochum	2024–25	Bundesliga	33	0	1	0	—		—		34	0
Bochum	2025–26	2. Bundesliga	30	0	3	0	—		—		33	0
Bochum	2026–27	2. Bundesliga	3	0	1	0	—		—		4	0
Bochum	Total		87	3	7	0	—		2	0	96	3
Career total			339	13	25	0	14	5	5	0	383	18
