= Daan Huisman =

Dutch footballer (born 2002)

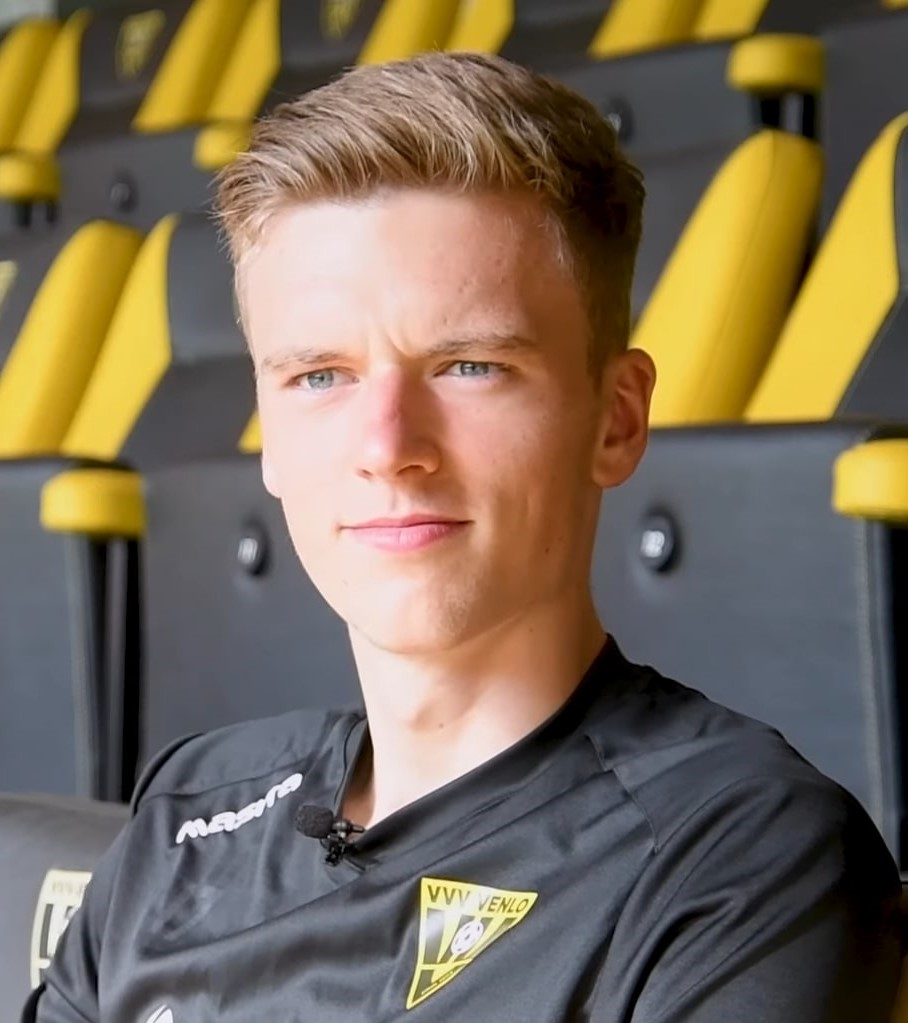
- Huisman in 2022

Personal information
- Full name: Daan Leonard Theodoor Huisman
- Date of birth: 26 July 2002 (age 24)
- Place of birth: Arnhem, Netherlands
- Height: 1.89 m (6 ft 2 in)
- Position: Midfielder

Team information
- Current team: Volendam
- Number: 8

Youth career
- 2006–2013: RKHVV
- 2013–2020: Vitesse

Senior career*
Years	Team	Apps	(Gls)
2020–2024	Vitesse	46	(0)
2022–2023	→ VVV (loan)	32	(4)
2023	→ Haugesund (loan)	10	(1)
2024–2026	Eindhoven	72	(6)
2026–	Volendam	0	(0)

International career^{‡}
2018	Netherlands U16	1	(0)
2019	Netherlands U17	2	(0)
- * Club domestic league appearances and goals as of 28 April 2026 ‡ National team caps and goals as of 22 November 2020

Daan Leonard Theodoor Huisman (born 26 July 2002) is a Dutch professional footballer who plays as a midfielder for Eerste Divisie club Volendam.

== Club career ==
Raised in Huissen, Huisman played youth football for local club RKHVV and Vitesse, where coach Edward Sturing promoted him to the first team during training camp in Portugal during the 2020–21 winter break. In the summer of 2020, Huisman signed his first professional contract with Vitesse until 2022.

Huisman made his professional debut on 19 September 2020 in a 2–0 home win over Sparta Rotterdam in the Eredivisie, replacing Loïs Openda in injury time. On 22 December 2020, his contract with Vitesse was extended until 2023.

On 25 November 2021, Huisman made his first start in a European game, also scoring his first professional goal in a 3–3 away draw at Rennes in the UEFA Europa Conference League group stage.

Huisman joined VVV-Venlo on a season-long loan on 31 August 2022. On 9 September 2022, Huisman scored his first ever league goal in a 5–3 away loss to Heracles Almelo in the Eerste Divisie. He returned to Vitesse at the end of the season, after scoring five goals in 37 appearances for VVV.

On 31 August 2023, Huisman signed a one-year contract with Haugesund in Norway. On 11 December 2023, Vitesse announced that Haugesund did not exercise the purchase option and Huisman would return to Vitesse.

On 10 August 2024, Huisman signed a two-season contract with Eindhoven.

== International career ==
Huisman is a youth international for the Netherlands. Having made his international debut at under-16 level, he was called up to the Netherlands under-17 squad for the first time in September 2018, but only made his debut for the team in a 1–1 friendly draw against Spain, replacing Dirk Proper in the 75th minute.

== Career statistics ==
As of match played 7 November 2025

Appearances and goals by club, season and competition
Club	Season	League			KNVB Cup		Europe		Other		Total	
Club	Season	Division	Apps	Goals	Apps	Goals	Apps	Goals	Apps	Goals	Apps	Goals
Vitesse	2020–21	Eredivisie	20	0	3	0	—		—		23	0
Vitesse	2021–22	Eredivisie	23	0	2	1	5 (Note: Appearances in the UEFA Europa Conference League)	2	4 (Note: Appearances in the Eredivisie European play-offs)	0	34	3
Vitesse	2022–23	Eredivisie	2	0	0	0	—		—		2	0
Vitesse	2023–24	Eredivisie	1	0	0	0	—		—		1	0
Vitesse	Total		46	0	5	1	5	2	4	0	60	3
VVV-Venlo (loan)	2022–23	Eerste Divisie	32	4	1	1	—		4 (Note: Appearances in Eredivisie promotion/relegation playoffs)	0	37	5
Haugesund (loan)	2023	Eliteserien	10	1	0	0	—		—		10	1
Eindhoven	2024–25	Eerste Divisie	35	2	2	2	—		—		37	4
Eindhoven	2025–26	Eerste Divisie	15	0	1	0	—		—		16	0
Eindhoven	Total		50	2	3	2	—		—		53	4
Career total			138	7	9	4	5	2	8	0	160	13
