= Thomas Buitink =

Dutch footballer (born 2000)

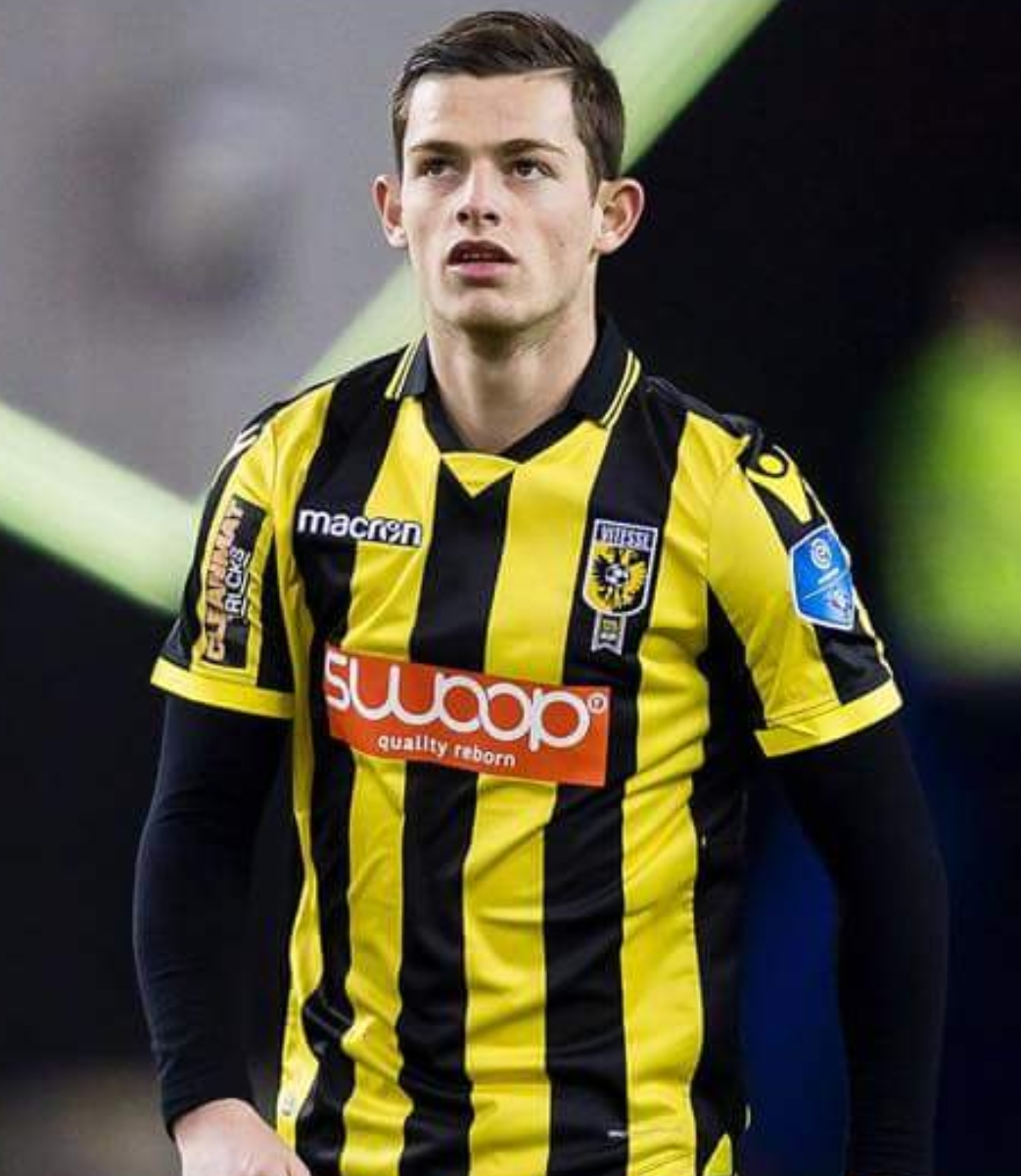
- Buitink with Vitesse in February 2018

Personal information
- Date of birth: 14 June 2000 (age 26)
- Place of birth: Nijkerk, Netherlands
- Height: 1.74 m (5 ft 9 in)
- Position: Forward

Team information
- Current team: Sparta Nijkerk

Youth career
- Veensche Boys
- 2010–2015: Vitesse

Senior career*
Years	Team	Apps	(Gls)
2015–2020	Jong Vitesse	41	(15)
2018–2024	Vitesse	101	(11)
2021	→ PEC Zwolle (loan)	9	(2)
2023	→ Fortuna Sittard (loan)	13	(0)
2024–2026	PEC Zwolle	21	(0)
2026–	Sparta Nijkerk	0	(0)

International career
2014–2015	Netherlands U15	7	(3)
2015–2016	Netherlands U16	14	(2)
2016–2017	Netherlands U17	15	(6)
2017–2018	Netherlands U18	2	(1)
2018	Netherlands U19	1	(0)
2019	Netherlands U20	6	(1)
2022	Netherlands U21	1	(0)
- * Club domestic league appearances and goals as of 21 May 2026

Thomas Buitink (born 14 June 2000) is a Dutch footballer who plays as a forward for Derde Divisie club Sparta Nijkerk.

== Club career ==
=== Vitesse ===
Buitink first joined Vitesse in 2010, from local side Veensche Boys. He made his first-team debut during Vitesse's 3–1 home victory against Feyenoord on 11 February 2018, replacing Luc Castaignos in the 80th minute.

On 31 October 2018, Buitink scored his first goal in professional football. In the last minute of a KNVB Cup match against Heracles Almelo, he decided the 0–2 result. His first goal in the Eredivisie followed on 2 March 2019. On that day, manager Leonid Slutsky allowed him to come on for Mohammed Dauda against NAC Breda after thirty-three minutes, as NAC were leading 0–1 after a goal by Giovanni Korte. Buitink scored the equaliser nine minutes after the break and Vitesse ultimately won 4–1 thanks to goals from Maikel van der Werff, Alexander Büttner and Matúš Bero. Buitink was allowed to start in for the first time in an Eredivisie match against ADO Den Haag on 30 March 2019. ADO managed to score three goals in total via Sheraldo Becker and Lex Immers twice, but Buitink saved a 3–3 draw with a hat-trick.

==== PEC Zwolle (loan) ====
In January 2021, he sent on a six-month loan to PEC Zwolle. Four days after his move, he was allowed to start against Heracles Almelo. That team went into halftime with a lead thanks to goals from Lucas Schoofs and Delano Burgzorg. Five minutes after the break, Buitink assisted Virgil Misidjan's goal. Coach John Stegeman substituted Buitink in favour of Reza Ghoochannejhad, who would eventually take care of the 2–2, which also turned out to be the final score.

==== Fortuna Sittard (loan) ====
For the second half of the 2022–23 season, Buitink was sent on loan to Fortuna Sittard. He made his Fortuna debut on 7 January 2023, coming on as a half-time substitute for Umaro Embaló in a 2–0 home loss to Go Ahead Eagles.

=== Return to PEC Zwolle ===
On 5 July 2024, Buitink returned to PEC Zwolle on a three-year contract.

His only goal in his second PEC Zwolle period came on 29 October 2024 in a cup match away at NEC Nijmegen, arch rivals of his former youth club Vitesse. His scored penalty led to three yellow cards (for Buitink, but also for teammate Kaj de Rooij and NEC defender Iván Márquez), after he provocated the NEC supporters with his celebration.

On 16 June 2026, Buitink announced his retirement from professional football, aged 26. His contract with PEC Zwolle was terminated.

=== Sparta Nijkerk ===
A few hours after the announcement of his retirement, amateur side Sparta Nijkerk announced the signing of Buitink. The length of his contract with the Derde Divisie side from his birthplace was not published.

== Career statistics ==
As of match played 17 May 2026

Appearances and goals by club, season and competition
Club	Season	League			KNVB Cup		Europe		Other		Total	
Club	Season	Division	Apps	Goals	Apps	Goals	Apps	Goals	Apps	Goals	Apps	Goals
Jong Vitesse	2016–17	Tweede Divisie	7	2	—		—		—		7	2
Jong Vitesse	2017–18	Derde Divisie	16	6	—		—		—		16	6
Jong Vitesse	2018–19	Tweede Divisie	9	3	—		—		—		9	3
Jong Vitesse	2019–20	Beloften Eredivisie	9	4	—		—		—		9	4
Jong Vitesse	Total		41	15	—		—		—		41	15
Vitesse	2017–18	Eredivisie	4	0	0	0	0	0	0	0	4	0
Vitesse	2018–19	Eredivisie	17	7	2	1	0	0	4 (Note: Appearances in Eredivisie European play-offs)	0	23	8
Vitesse	2019–20	Eredivisie	17	0	3	1	—		—		20	1
Vitesse	2020–21	Eredivisie	14	1	2	1	—		—		16	2
Vitesse	2021–22	Eredivisie	28	2	3	0	9 (Note: Appearances in the UEFA Europa Conference League)	2	4	1	44	5
Vitesse	2022–23	Eredivisie	8	0	0	0	—		—		8	0
Vitesse	2023–24	Eredivisie	13	1	1	0	—		—		14	1
Vitesse	Total		101	11	11	3	9	2	8	1	129	17
PEC Zwolle (loan)	2020–21	Eredivisie	9	2	—		—		—		9	2
Fortuna Sittard (loan)	2022–23	Eredivisie	13	0	—		—		—		13	0
PEC Zwolle	2024–25	Eredivisie	13	0	1	1	—		—		14	1
PEC Zwolle	2025–26	Eredivisie	8	0	2	0	—		—		10	0
PEC Zwolle	Total		21	0	3	1	—		—		24	1
Career total			185	28	14	4	9	2	8	1	216	35

== Honours ==
Jong Vitesse

- Derde Divisie – Sunday: 2017–18
