= Trustin Farrugia Cann =

Maltese football referee and sports administrator (born 1985)

- Born: 29 December 1985 (age 40)
| Years | | Role |
| 2001–2025 | | Referee |

International
| Years | League | Role |
| 2016–2025 | UEFA | FIFA referee |

Trustin Farrugia Cann (born 29 December 1985) is a Maltese football referee and sports administrator. A FIFA-listed referee for a decade, he officiated in UEFA Europa League and UEFA Europa Conference League group stages as well as FIFA World Cup and UEFA European Championship qualifiers. In October 2025 he retired from refereeing and was elected MFA Vice-President.

== Refereeing career ==
Farrugia Cann began refereeing in Malta in the early 2000s and progressed through domestic divisions to the Maltese Premier League. He first obtained a place on the FIFA International List for 2016, following nominations announced in December 2015.

Across his international career he handled UEFA club competition matches and senior internationals; the MFA notes group-stage appointments in the Europa League and Europa Conference League, and qualifiers for the World Cup and European Championship. In July 2025 he was assigned to a UEFA Europa Conference League first qualifying round tie (FK Partizani v Nõmme Kalju) in Tirana. Earlier, in March 2022, he officiated a UEFA Youth League Round of 16 match between Žilina and Salzburg.

He announced his retirement from active refereeing in October 2025 after 24 years in refereeing, 10 of which on the FIFA International List.

== Administration and other roles ==
An engineer by profession, Farrugia Cann briefly served as CEO of Infrastructure Malta in 2022 before resigning after around 40 days, citing incompatibility with international refereeing travel and commitments.

Within Maltese refereeing, he also served as President of the Malta Football Referees Association (MFRA). In October 2025 he was elected Vice-President of the Malta FA by acclamation at the Association’s General Assembly.

== Honours and recognition ==
- MFPA Referee of the Year: 2020
