= Nikolai Baden =

Danish footballer (born 2000)

Personal information
- Full name: Nikolai Baden Frederiksen
- Date of birth: 18 May 2000 (age 26)
- Place of birth: Odense, Denmark
- Height: 1.80 m (5 ft 11 in)
- Position: Forward

Team information
- Current team: WSG Tirol
- Number: 8

Youth career
- Næsby
- 2015–2017: Nordsjælland
- 2018–2020: Juventus

Senior career*
Years	Team	Apps	(Gls)
2017–2018	Nordsjælland	11	(3)
2018–2021	Juventus	0	(0)
2019–2020	→ Juventus U23 (res.)	9	(0)
2020	→ Fortuna Sittard (loan)	2	(0)
2020–2021	→ WSG Tirol (loan)	31	(18)
2021–2024	Vitesse	40	(10)
2023	→ Ferencváros (loan)	6	(0)
2023–2024	→ Austria Lustenau (loan)	10	(0)
2024–2025	Lyngby	8	(0)
2024	→ IFK Göteborg (loan)	3	(0)
2025–	WSG Tirol	25	(9)

International career
2015–2016	Denmark U16	7	(1)
2016–2017	Denmark U17	9	(6)
2017–2018	Denmark U18	5	(2)
2018–2019	Denmark U19	6	(2)
2021	Denmark U20	2	(0)
2021	Denmark U21	5	(0)
- * Club domestic league appearances and goals as of 10 June 2026

Nikolai Baden Frederiksen (born 18 May 2000) is a Danish professional footballer who plays as a forward for Austrian Bundesliga club WSG Tirol.

== Youth career ==
Baden started playing football at Næsby BK, and joined FC Nordsjælland in the summer 2015. At the age of 14, Baden was on a trial at Liverpool. He played a friendly game for their U16 squad against Wigan Athletic, which they won 2–1.

== Club career ==
=== FC Nordsjælland ===
In the summer 2017, Baden signed a 3-year youth contract with the club and began training with the first team squad. He also went on a training camp with the team in the summer 2017 at the Netherlands.

Baden's first senior experience was on 30 July 2017, where he sat on the bench for the whole game against AaB. He got his debut for FC Nordsjælland on 14 October 2017 against Randers FC. Baden started on the bench, but replaced Viktor Tranberg in the 84th minute. Two minutes later, Baden scored the winning goal at the age of only 17 and FCN won the game 3–2.

=== Juventus ===
On 18 August 2018, it was announced that Baden had signed a four-year deal with Juventus. He started playing for the Primavera squad. Baden was bought for a price about 11,3 millioner danish krone.

Baden mainly played for Juventus' Primavera team in his first season. He got his debut for Juventus U23 in the Serie C in April 2019. After 9 appearances in Serie C, Baden was loaned out to Dutch club Fortuna Sittard on 31 January 2020 for the rest of the season. On 25 August, he was sent out on loan to Austrian club WSG Tirol for the 2020–21 season.

=== Vitesse ===
On 14 July 2021, he signed a three-year contract, with an additional extension option, with the Dutch club Vitesse. Baden scored in his first official game for the club against PEC Zwolle in the Eredivisie on 15 August 2021.

On transfer deadline day, 31 January 2023, Baden joined Hungarian club Ferencváros on a one-year loan deal - until 15 January 2024 - with an option to buy.

=== Ferencváros ===
On 1 February 2023, he was signed by Nemzeti Bajnokság I club, Ferencváros.

On 5 May 2023, he won the 2022–23 Nemzeti Bajnokság I with Ferencváros, after Kecskemét lost 1–0 to Honvéd at the Bozsik Aréna on the 30th matchday.

=== Austria Lustenau ===
On 1 September 2023, Baden Frederiksen moved on a new loan to Austria Lustenau in Austria, with an option to buy.

=== Lyngby ===
On 2 February 2024, Baden Frederiksen signed a contract with Lyngby until the summer of 2027.

By August 2024, Baden had played just two minutes over two games since his move to Lyngby in the winter of 2024 - and not because he was injured. On August 23, 2024, Baden was therefore loaned out to Swedish Allsvenskan club IFK Göteborg for the rest of the year with a built-in option to buy. On November 14, 2024, Göteborg, who only managed to play 140 minutes, confirmed his return to Lyngby and that the Swedish club would not exercise the purchase option.

On 1 September 2025, Lyngby confirmed the termination of the contract after mutual agreement.

=== WSG Tirol ===
On 2 October 2025, Baden Frederiksen returned to Austrian Bundesliga side WSG Tirol for his second stint at the club.
