= Simon van Duivenbooden =

South African footballer (born 2002)

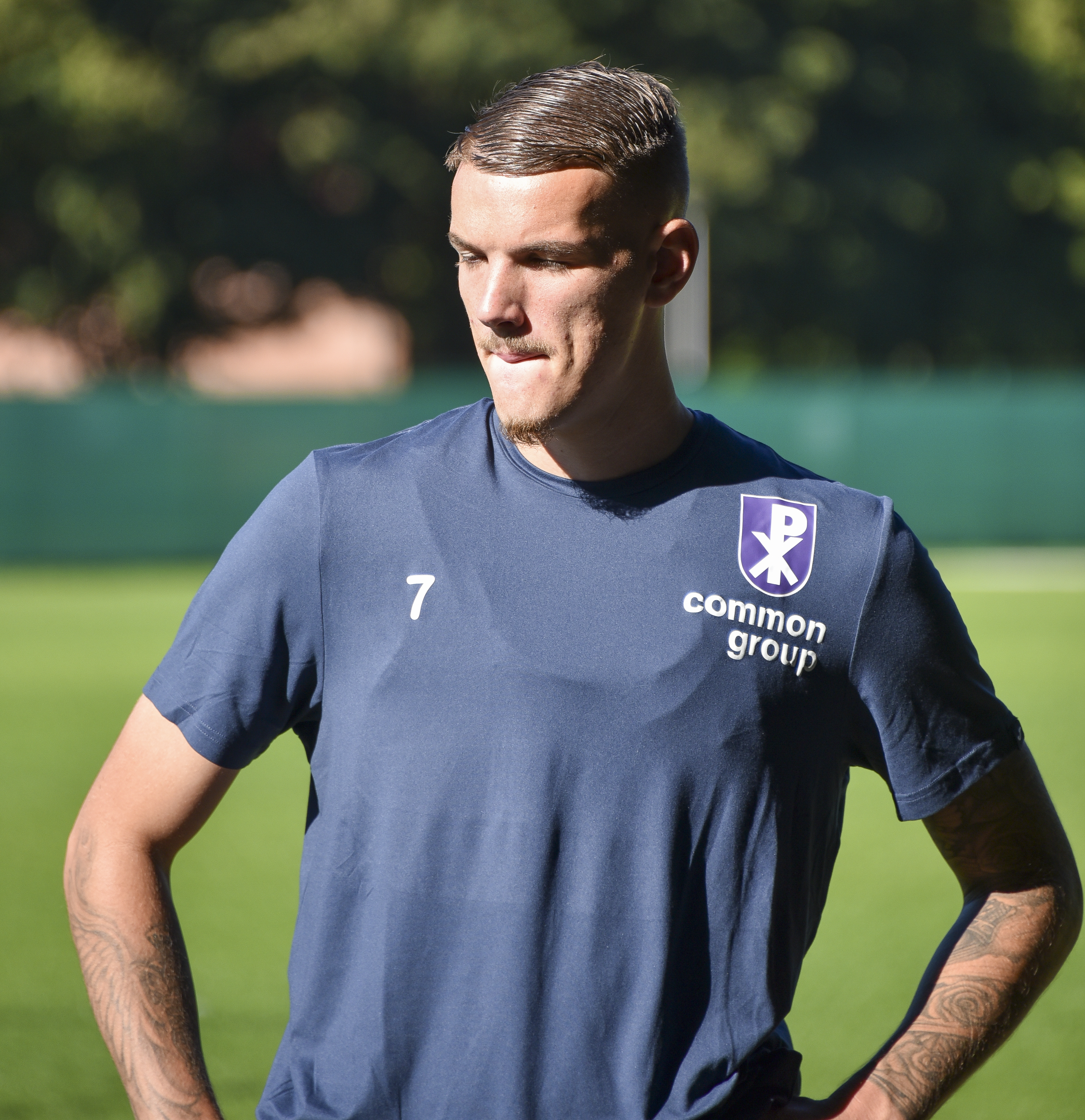
- Simon van Duivenbooden

Personal information
- Date of birth: 11 May 2002 (age 24)
- Place of birth: Uithoorn, Netherlands
- Height: 1.90 m (6 ft 3 in)
- Position: Forward

Team information
- Current team: Glacis United
- Number: 9

Youth career
- Legmeervogels
- 2014–2017: Alphense Boys
- 2017–2019: Vitesse
- 2019–2021: PSV
- 2021–2022: Vitesse

Senior career*
Years	Team	Apps	(Gls)
2022–2025	Vitesse	27	(1)
2025	Cape Town City	3	(0)
2026	VPS	3	(0)
2026–	Glacis United	10	(10)
- * Club domestic league appearances and goals as of 21 November 2026

Simon van Duivenbooden (born 11 May 2002) is a Dutch-born South African professional footballer who plays as a forward for Glacis United.

== Club career ==
Van Duivenbooden is a youth product of Legmeervogels, Alphense Boys, Vitesse, and PSV successively. He returned to Vitesse, signing a contract on 20 May 2021. He made his professional debut with Vitesse in a 3–1 Eredivisie loss to AZ, coming on as a sub in the 81st minute. Van Duivenbooden scored his professional first goal against Go Ahead Eagles on 13 November 2022. On 19 January 2023, Van Duivenbooden extended his contract with Vitesse until 2025.

On 4 September 2023, Van Duivenbooden joined Patro Eisden in Belgium on loan. Eight days later, he returned to Vitesse for personal reasons, leading to the cancellation of his loan deal.

=== Cape Town City ===
On 8 August 2025, Van Duivenbooden signed with recently relegated National First Division club Cape Town City.

In 2026 he joined Finnish side VPS Vaasa. He joined Glacis United that summer, scoring on his debut against Europa.

== Personal life ==
Van Duivenbooden was born in the Netherlands and is of South African descent, holding dual citizenship.
