= List of Dutch football transfers winter 2018–19 =

This is a list of Dutch football transfers for the 2018–19 winter transfer window by club. Only transfers of clubs in the Eredivisie are included.

== Eredivisie ==
Note: Flags indicate national team as has been defined under FIFA eligibility rules. Players may hold more than one non-FIFA nationality.

=== ADO Den Haag ===
In:

No.	Pos.	Nation	Player

Out:

No.	Pos.	Nation	Player
15	DF	NED	Bas Kuipers (to (Romania) Viitorul Constanța)
20	DF	NED	Nick Kuipers (on loan to Emmen)

=== Ajax ===
In:

No.	Pos.	Nation	Player
16	DF	ARG	Lisandro Magallán (from (Argentina) Boca Juniors)
28	GK	POR	Bruno Varela (on loan from (Portugal) Benfica)

Out:

No.	Pos.	Nation	Player
5	DF	AUT	Maximilian Wöber (to (Spain) Sevilla)
16	DF	COL	Luis Manuel Orejuela (on loan to (Brazil) Cruzeiro)
39	FW	NED	Kaj Sierhuis (on loan to Groningen)
—	FW	COL	Mateo Cassierra (on loan to (Argentina) Racing Club, previously on loan at Groningen)

=== AZ Alkmaar ===
In:

No.	Pos.	Nation	Player

Out:

No.	Pos.	Nation	Player
54	FW	NGR	Fred Friday (on loan to Twente)
57	MF	MAR	Iliass Bel Hassani (on loan to Groningen)

=== De Graafschap ===
In:

No.	Pos.	Nation	Player
1	GK	NED	Nigel Bertrams (on loan from (Denmark) Nordsjælland)
15	DF	NED	Ruben Ligeon (on loan from PEC Zwolle)
21	MF	NED	Azor Matusiwa (on loan from Jong Ajax)
35	FW	CUW	Charlison Benschop (on loan from (Germany) FC Ingolstadt 04)

Out:

No.	Pos.	Nation	Player
1	GK	IRI	Agil Etemadi (to Almere City)
12	DF	SUR	Myenty Abena (to (Slovakia) Spartak Trnava)
19	FW	NED	Jordy Thomassen (on loan to (Australia) Adelaide United)
47	FW	NED	Mo Hamdaoui (on loan to Twente)

=== Emmen ===
In:

No.	Pos.	Nation	Player
15	FW	NED	Michael de Leeuw (from (United States) Chicago Fire)
29	DF	GER	Nico Neidhart (from (Germany) Sportfreunde Lotte)
33	DF	NED	Nick Kuipers (on loan from ADO Den Haag)
44	DF	CRO	Andrej Lukić (on loan from (Portugal) Braga, previously on loan at (Greece) Apollon Smyrnis)
99	FW	NED	Sven Braken (on loan from NEC)

Out:

No.	Pos.	Nation	Player
15	DF	ENG	Easah Suliman (loan return to (England) Aston Villa U23)
21	DF	NED	Kjelt Engbers (to Hoogeveen)

=== Excelsior ===
In:

No.	Pos.	Nation	Player
—	FW	GER	Dennis Eckert (on loan from (Spain) Celta)

Out:

No.	Pos.	Nation	Player

=== Feyenoord ===
In:

No.	Pos.	Nation	Player
24	DF	CUW	Cuco Martina (on loan from (England) Everton, previously on loan at (England) Stoke City)

Out:

No.	Pos.	Nation	Player
20	MF	PER	Renato Tapia (on loan to Willem II)
27	FW	MAR	Mohamed El Hankouri (on loan to Groningen)

=== Fortuna Sittard ===
In:

No.	Pos.	Nation	Player
24	DF	FRA	Mahamadou Dembélé (on loan from (Austria) Red Bull Salzburg)
28	GK	SLO	Ažbe Jug (free agent)
31	DF	GER	Anthony Syhre (from (Germany) Würzburger Kickers)
33	FW	ALB	Agim Zeka (on loan from (France) Lille, previously on loan at (Portugal) Leixões)
99	MF	CRO	Andrija Balić (on loan from (Italy) Udinese)

Out:

No.	Pos.	Nation	Player
7	FW	POR	André Vidigal (on loan to (Cyprus) APOEL)
26	MF	NED	Bo Breukers (on loan to Dordrecht)
33	DF	GER	Christopher Braun (to (Greece) OFI Crete)
—	MF	BRA	Vítor Saba (retired)

=== Groningen ===
In:

No.	Pos.	Nation	Player
8	MF	MAR	Iliass Bel Hassani (on loan from AZ)
9	FW	NED	Kaj Sierhuis (on loan from Ajax)
14	FW	MAR	Mohamed El Hankouri (on loan from Feyenoord)
15	MF	NED	Thomas Bruns (on loan from Vitesse)
17	MF	JPN	Ko Itakura (on loan from (England) Manchester City U23)
19	FW	NED	Paul Gladon (from (England) Wolverhampton Wanderers, previously on loan at (Belgium) Sint-Truiden)

Out:

No.	Pos.	Nation	Player
9	FW	COL	Mateo Cassierra (loan return to Ajax)
14	FW	MEX	Uriel Antuna (loan return to (England) Manchester City U23)
18	FW	NED	Ahmad Mendes Moreira (on loan to Telstar)

=== Heerenveen ===
In:

No.	Pos.	Nation	Player
—	DF	DEN	Andreas Skovgaard (from (Denmark) Nordsjælland)
—	FW	NOR	Dennis Johnsen (on loan from Jong Ajax)
—	DF	SWE	Ibrahim Drešević (from (Sweden) Elfsborg)

Out:

No.	Pos.	Nation	Player
4	DF	NOR	Nicolai Næss (to (Norway) Sarpsborg 08)
7	FW	NZL	Marco Rojas (to (Denmark) SønderjyskE)
13	FW	KOS	Arbër Zeneli (to (France) Reims)
14	DF	NED	Dave Bulthuis (to (South Korea) Ulsan Hyundai)
26	MF	NED	Jordy Bruijn (on loan to NEC)

=== Heracles Almelo ===
In:

No.	Pos.	Nation	Player
13	DF	NED	Mats Knoester (from Jong Feyenoord)

Out:

No.	Pos.	Nation	Player
19	FW	NED	Vincent Vermeij (on loan to Den Bosch)

=== NAC Breda ===
In:

No.	Pos.	Nation	Player
12	MF	SWE	Ramon Lundqvist (from PSV Eindhoven)
19	FW	ENG	Sullay Kaikai (from (England) Crystal Palace)
22	DF	NED	Khalid Karami (on loan from Vitesse)
23	DF	AUS	Alex Gersbach (from (Norway) Rosenborg)
—	DF	FRA	Dorian Dervite (on loan from (Belgium) Charleroi)

Out:

No.	Pos.	Nation	Player
15	DF	CUW	Jurich Carolina (on loan to Den Bosch)
19	MF	BEL	Olivier Rommens (to TOP Oss)
22	MF	BEL	Robbie Haemhouts (retired)
31	MF	NED	Vinnie Vermeer (to (United States) Nashville)

=== PEC Zwolle ===
In:

No.	Pos.	Nation	Player
4	DF	JPN	Yuta Nakayama (from (Japan) Kashiwa Reysol)
10	FW	GER	Lennart Thy (from (Turkey) BB Erzurumspor)
22	MF	NED	Pelle Clement (from (England) Reading)

Out:

No.	Pos.	Nation	Player
10	FW	ITA	Gianluca Scamacca (loan return to (Italy) Sassuolo)
13	DF	ITA	Alessandro Tripaldelli (loan return to (Italy) Sassuolo)
24	DF	NED	Ruben Ligeon (on loan to De Graafschap)
40	GK	NED	Mike Hauptmeijer (on loan to Achilles '29)

=== PSV Eindhoven ===
In:

No.	Pos.	Nation	Player
32	MF	CZE	Michal Sadílek (from Jong PSV)

Out:

No.	Pos.	Nation	Player
2	DF	FRA	Nicolas Isimat-Mirin (to (Turkey) Beşiktaş)
24	MF	SWE	Ramon Lundqvist (to NAC Breda)

=== Utrecht ===
In:

No.	Pos.	Nation	Player
23	MF	NED	Riechedly Bazoer (on loan from (Germany) VfL Wolfsburg, previously on loan at (Portugal) Porto)
29	FW	NED	Nick Venema (from Jong FC Utrecht)
30	FW	NED	Michiel Kramer (from (Israel) Maccabi Haifa)

Out:

No.	Pos.	Nation	Player
25	MF	NED	Odysseus Velanas (on loan to Helmond Sport)

=== Vitesse ===
In:

No.	Pos.	Nation	Player
—	FW	GHA	Dauda Mohammed (on loan from (Belgium) Anderlecht)

Out:

No.	Pos.	Nation	Player
2	DF	NED	Khalid Karami (on loan to NAC Breda)
10	MF	NED	Thomas Bruns (on loan to Groningen)
43	DF	NED	Lassana Faye (to Sparta Rotterdam)

=== VVV-Venlo ===
In:

No.	Pos.	Nation	Player

Out:

No.	Pos.	Nation	Player

=== Willem II ===
In:

No.	Pos.	Nation	Player
9	FW	SWE	Alexander Isak (on loan from (Germany) Borussia Dortmund)
10	FW	GRE	Vangelis Pavlidis (on loan from (Germany) VfL Bochum, previously on loan at (Germany) Borussia Dortmund II)
16	FW	GRE	Marios Vrousai (on loan from (Greece) Olympiacos)
26	MF	PER	Renato Tapia (on loan from Feyenoord)

Out:

No.	Pos.	Nation	Player
9	FW	ESP	Fran Sol (to (Ukraine) Dynamo Kyiv)
10	FW	GRE	Dimitris Kolovos (loan return to (Belgium) Mechelen)
11	FW	BEL	Jordy Croux (on loan to MVV Maastricht)
31	GK	NED	Mattijs Branderhorst (on loan to NEC)
