= 2018–19 SBV Vitesse season =

Vitesse
2018–19 season
- Chairman: Bert Roetert
- Manager: Leonid Slutsky
- Stadium: GelreDome
- Eredivisie: 5th
- KNVB Cup: Quarter-final
- UEFA Europa League: Third qualifying round (vs. Basel)
- Top goalscorer: League: Bryan Linssen (12); All: Bryan Linssen (14)
- Highest home attendance: 21,248 vs PSV (7 April 2019)
- Lowest home attendance: 9,876 vs Viitorul Constanța (2 August 2018)
- Average home league attendance: 11,614
Home colours	Away colours	Third colours

The 2018–19 season was Vitesse's 29th consecutive season in the top flight of Dutch football, the Eredivisie, and 126th year in existence as a football club. The season covered the period from 1 July 2018 to 30 June 2019.

== Squad ==
As of match 23 April 2019

No.	Name	Nationality	Position	Date of birth (age)	Signed from	Signed in	Contract ends	Apps.	Goals
Goalkeepers
1	Eduardo	(Portugal)	GK	19 September 1982 (age 44)	loan from Chelsea	2018	2019	34	0
22	Remko Pasveer	(Netherlands)	GK	8 November 1983 (age 43)	PSV Eindhoven	2017	2020	40	0
40	Bilal Bayazit	(Netherlands)	GK	8 April 1999 (age 27)	Academy	2017	2021	0	0
Defenders
3	Maikel van der Werff	(Netherlands)	DF	22 April 1989 (age 37)	PEC Zwolle	2015	2019	90	4
5	Max Clark	(England)	DF	19 January 1996 (age 30)	Hull City	2018	2021	25	1
6	Arnold Kruiswijk	(Netherlands)	DF	2 November 1984 (age 42)	Heerenveen	2014	2019	76	1
8	Vyacheslav Karavayev	(Russia)	DF	20 May 1995 (age 31)	Sparta Prague	2018	2021	54	0
14	Jake Clarke-Salter	(England)	DF	22 September 1997 (age 29)	loan from Chelsea	2019	2020	35	1
26	Rasmus Thelander	(Denmark)	DF	9 July 1991 (age 35)	Zürich	2018	2021	13	0
28	Alexander Büttner	(Netherlands)	DF	11 February 1989 (age 37)	Dynamo Moscow	2017	2019	71	3
30	Danilho Doekhi	(Netherlands)	DF	30 June 1998 (age 28)	Jong Ajax	2018	2022	21	0
Midfielders
7	Roy Beerens	(Netherlands)	MF	22 December 1987 (age 38)	Reading	2018	2021	38	3
11	Bryan Linssen	(Netherlands)	MF	8 October 1990 (age 36)	Groningen	2017	2020	79	33
17	Thulani Serero	(South Africa)	MF	11 April 1990 (age 36)	Ajax	2017	2020	74	3
18	Martin Ødegaard	(Norway)	MF	17 December 1998 (age 27)	loan from Real Madrid	2018	2019	33	8
19	Hilary Gong	(Nigeria)	MF	10 October 1998 (age 28)	AS Trenčín	2018	2022	11	0
20	Charly Musonda	(Belgium)	MF	15 October 1996 (age 30)	loan from Chelsea	2018	2019	0	0
21	Matúš Bero	(Slovakia)	MF	6 September 1995 (age 31)	Trabzonspor	2018	2022	35	9
23	Mukhtar Ali	(Saudi Arabia)	MF	30 October 1997 (age 29)	Chelsea	2017	2020	18	1
25	Navarone Foor	(Netherlands)	MF	4 February 1992 (age 34)	NEC	2016	2020	111	14
Forwards
9	Tim Matavž	(Slovenia)	FW	13 January 1989 (age 37)	Augsburg	2017		58	25
10	Mohammed Dauda	(Ghana)	FW	20 February 1998 (age 28)	loan from Anderlecht	2019	2019	12	3
13	Oussama Darfalou	(Algeria)	FW	23 September 1993 (age 33)	USM Alger	2018	2022	27	7
29	Thomas Buitink	(Netherlands)	FW	14 June 2000 (age 26)	Academy	2018	2022	21	6
39	Richonell Margaret	(Netherlands)	FW	7 July 2000 (age 26)	Ajax	2018		5	0
Out on loan
2	Khalid Karami	(Netherlands)	DF	29 December 1989 (age 36)	Excelsior	2018	2020	1	0
10	Thomas Bruns	(Netherlands)	MF	7 January 1992 (age 34)	Heracles Almelo	2017	2021	51	4
Left during the season
16	Mitchell van Bergen	(Netherlands)	MF	27 August 1999 (age 27)	Willem II	2015		37	0

== Transfers ==
=== In ===
Date	Position	Nationality	Name	From	Fee	Ref.
8 May 2018 †	DF	(Netherlands)	Khalid Karami	Excelsior	Free	
16 May 2018	DF	(Denmark)	Rasmus Thelander	Zürich	Undisclosed	
6 June 2018 †	FW	(Algeria)	Oussama Darfalou	USM Alger	Free	
11 June 2018	DF	(Netherlands)	Özgür Aktas	NEC	Undisclosed	
22 June 2018 †	DF	(England)	Max Clark	Hull City	Free	
3 July 2018	MF	(Slovakia)	Matúš Bero	Trabzonspor	Undisclosed	
4 July 2018	DF	(Netherlands)	Danilho Doekhi	Jong Ajax	Undisclosed	
5 July 2018	MF	(Nigeria)	Hilary Gong	AS Trenčín	Undisclosed	
27 August 2018	DF	(Netherlands)	Mats Grotenbreg	TOP Oss	Undisclosed	

† Transfers announced on the above dates, but were not finalised until 1 July.

=== Loans in ===
Date from	Position	Nationality	Name	From	Date to	Ref.
2 July 2018	DF	(England)	Jake Clarke-Salter	Chelsea	30 June 2019	
6 July 2018	GK	(Portugal)	Eduardo	Chelsea	30 June 2019	
21 August 2018	MF	(Norway)	Martin Ødegaard	Real Madrid	30 June 2019	
31 August 2018	MF	(Belgium)	Charly Musonda	Chelsea	30 June 2019	
31 January 2019	FW	(Ghana)	Mohammed Dauda	Anderlecht	30 June 2019	

=== Out ===
Date	Position	Nationality	Name	To	Fee	Ref.
24 May 2018	MF	(Netherlands)	Julian Calor	Cambuur	Undisclosed	
10 July 2018	DF	(Georgia (country))	Guram Kashia	San Jose Earthquakes	Undisclosed	
20 July 2018	DF	(Netherlands)	Quincy Kluivert	TEC	Undisclosed	
31 August 2018	MF	(Netherlands)	Mitchell van Bergen	Heerenveen	Undisclosed	

=== Loans out ===
Date from	Position	Nationality	Name	To	Date to	Ref.
1 July 2018	DF	(Netherlands)	Julian Lelieveld	Go Ahead Eagles	30 June 2019	
1 July 2018	MF	(Netherlands)	Sven van Doorm	Telstar	30 June 2019	
27 August 2018	GK	(Netherlands)	Jeroen Houwen	Telstar	30 June 2019	
24 December 2018	FW	(Netherlands)	Thomas Bruns	Groningen	30 June 2019	
1 January 2019	DF	(Netherlands)	Khalid Karami	NAC Breda	30 June 2019	

=== Released ===
Date	Position	Nationality	Name	Joined	Date
30 June 2018	GK	(Denmark)	Michael Tørnes	Vendsyssel	31 August 2018
30 June 2018	DF	(Curaçao)	Leeroy Schorea	Achilles '29	
30 June 2018	DF	(Netherlands)	Thomas Oude Kotte	Excelsior	25 June 2018
30 June 2018	DF	(Netherlands)	Gino Bosz	Go Ahead Eagles	1 July 2019
30 June 2018	MF	(Netherlands)	Jovi Munter		
30 June 2018	MF	(Netherlands)	Hidde van Dijk	Blauw Geel '38	2 July 2018
30 June 2018	FW	(Netherlands)	Cali Daniel	NEC	

== Friendlies ==
Following the conclusion of the 2017–18 campaign, Vitesse announced they would play Wolfsberger AC, Shakhtar Donetsk, Arsenal Tula and Lokomotiv Moscow in July 2018.

6 July 2018 Friendly	Wolfsberger AC	2–1	Vitesse	Murau, Austria
19:00 CET	Gschweidl 65'; Schmerböck 68'	Report	Darfalou 87'	Stadium: Murau

9 July 2018 Friendly	Shakhtar Donetsk	4–1	Vitesse	Klagenfurt, Austria
18:00 CET	Stepanenko 31'; Butko 57'; Kovalenko 76'; Moraes 82'	Report	Beerens 89'	Stadium: Wörthersee Stadion

13 July 2018 Friendly	Arsenal Tula	2–2	Vitesse	Villach, Austria
18:00 CET	Berkhamov 84' (pen.); Lesovoy 89'	Report	Linssen 18'; Kostadinov 29' (og.)	Stadium: Stadion Villach/Lind

17 July 2018 Friendly	Vitesse	3–0	Lokomotiv Moscow	Klagenfurt, Austria
12:00 CET	Bruns 30'; Beerens 63'; Büttner 88'	Report		Stadium: Klagenfurt/Fischl

== Competitions ==
=== Overview ===
Competition	Record							
Competition	G	W	D	L	GF	GA	GD	Win %
Eredivisie	16	7	4	5	25	19	+6	43.75
KNVB Cup	3	3	0	0	6	2	+4	100.00
UEFA Europa League	4	1	1	2	5	5	+0	25.00
Total	23	11	5	7	36	26	+10	47.83

Updated to match played 20 December 2018
Source: Competitions

=== Eredivisie ===
==== League table ====
Pos	Team	Pld	W	D	L	GF	GA	GD	Pts	Qualification or relegation
3	Feyenoord	34	20	5	9	75	41	+34	65	Qualification for the Europa League third qualifying round (Note: Since the winners of the 2018–19 KNVB Cup, Ajax, qualified for European competition based on league position, the spot awarded to the KNVB Cup winners (Europa League third qualifying round) was passed to the third-placed team and the spot awarded to the third-placed team (Europa League second qualifying round) was passed to the fourth-placed team.)
4	AZ	34	17	7	10	64	43	+21	58	Qualification for the Europa League second qualifying round
5	Vitesse	34	14	11	9	70	51	+19	53	Qualification for the European competition play-offs (Note: Four teams play for a spot in the 2019–20 UEFA Europa League second qualifying round.)
6	Utrecht (O)	34	15	8	11	60	51	+9	53	Qualification for the European competition play-offs
7	Heracles Almelo	34	15	3	16	61	68	−7	48	Qualification for the European competition play-offs

Source: eredivisie.nl
Rules for classification: Season in progress: 1) Most points won; 2) Less points lost; 3) Goal difference; 4) Goals scored; 5) Alphabetical order; End of season: 1) Points; 2) Goal difference; 3) Goals scored; 4) Head-to-head points; 5) Head-to-head goal difference; 6) Head-to-head away goals scored; 7) Play-off if relevant for deciding champion, relegation or participating in a European league, otherwise by draw. 8) Penalty shoot-out (only after a play-off)
(O) Play-off winners
Notes:

Ten teams, two from the Eredivisie and eight from the Eerste Divisie, played for two spots in the 2019–20 Eredivisie, the remaining eight teams playing in the 2019–20 Eerste Divisie.

First round
NEC	2	0	2
RKC Waalwijk	0	3	3
SC Cambuur	2	2	4
Almere City	2	1	3

Second round
RKC Waalwijk	2	1	3
Excelsior	1	1	2
Go Ahead Eagles	2	1	3
FC Den Bosch	2	0	2
TOP Oss	0	0	0
Sparta Rotterdam	2	3	5
SC Cambuur	1	0	1
De Graafschap	1	2	3

Third round
RKC Waalwijk*	0	5	5
Go Ahead Eagles	0	4	4
Sparta Rotterdam*	1	2	3
De Graafschap	2	0	2

Key: * = Play-off winners, (a) = Wins because of away goals rule, (e) = Wins after extra time in second leg, (p) = Wins after penalty shoot-out.

==== Results summary ====
Overall								Home						Away					
Pld	W	D	L	GF	GA	GD	Pts	W	D	L	GF	GA	GD	W	D	L	GF	GA	GD
32	12	11	9	61	49	+12	47	9	6	1	39	24	+15	3	5	8	22	25	−3

Last updated: 20 April 2019.
Source: Eredivisie

==== Results by matchday ====
Matchday	1	2	3	4	5	6	7	8	9	10	11	12	13	14	15	16	17	18	19	20	21	22	23	24	25	26	27	28	29	30	31	32	33	34
Ground	H	A	A	H	A	H	A	H	A	H	A	H	A	H	A	H	A	H	A	H	A	H	A	H	H	A	A	H	H	A	H	A	H	A
Result	W	D	D	L	W	D	L	W	L	W	L	W	W	D	L	W	D	W	L	D	L	W	W	W	D	L	D	D	D	D	W	L	W	W
Position	2	3	6	8	6	7	7	5	7	5	7	6	4	6	7	6	5	4	5	5	5	5	5	5	5	5	7	6	7	7	6	6	5	5

Updated to match(es) played on 23 April 2019. Source: Vitesse
A = Away; H = Home; W = Win; D = Draw; L = Loss

==== Results ====
The fixtures for the 2018–19 season were announced in June 2018.

12 August 2018 1	Vitesse	5–1	Groningen	Arnhem
14:30 CEST (UTC+2)	Linssen 22'; Bero 44'; Beerens 62'; Clarke-Salter 66'; Matavž 71'	Report	Hrustic (yellow card) 32'; Doan 38'; Te Wierik (yellow card) 90+2'	Stadium: GelreDome; Attendance: 13,434; Referee: Allard Lindhout

19 August 2018 2	Heerenveen	1–1	Vitesse	Heerenveen
16:45 CEST (UTC+2)	Vlap 26'; Lammers (yellow card) 44'; Mihajlović (yellow card) 51'; Bulthuis (yellow card) 90'	Report	Linssen (yellow card) 40'; Van der Werff (yellow card) 64'; Matavž 81'	Stadium: Abe Lenstra Stadion; Referee: Siemen Mulder

26 August 2018 3	AZ	0–0	Vitesse	Alkmaar
16:45 CEST (UTC+2)	Svensson (yellow card) 5'; Hatzidiakos (yellow card) 34'; Idrissi (yellow card) 39'	Report	Serero (yellow card) 39'; Bero (yellow card) 43'; Büttner (yellow card) 89'	Stadium: AFAS Stadion; Attendance: 14,702; Referee: Serdar Gözübüyük

2 September 2018 4	Vitesse	0–4	Ajax	Arnhem
14:30 CEST (UTC+2)	Bero (yellow card) 14'; Foor (yellow card) 22'; Linssen (yellow card) 42'	Report	Ziyech 3'; Huntelaar 7', 58'; Tadić 19'	Stadium: GelreDome; Attendance: 19,231; Referee: Pol van Boekel

16 September 2018 5	PEC Zwolle	0–2	Vitesse	Zwolle
16:45 CEST (UTC+2)	Van Polen (yellow card) 20'	Report	Van der Werff (yellow card) 14'; Matavž 26', 44'; Clark (yellow card) 29'; Bero (yellow card) 78'	Stadium: MAC³PARK Stadion; Attendance: 13,325; Referee: Christiaan Bax

22 September 2018 6	Vitesse	1–1	ADO Den Haag	Arnhem
20:45 CEST (UTC+2)	Matavž 18'; Van der Werff (yellow card) 58' (yellow-red card) 90'	Report	El Khayati 65'; Immers (yellow card) 72'; Malone (yellow card) 75'	Stadium: GelreDome; Attendance: 14,023; Referee: Jeroen Manschot

30 September 2018 7	Feyenoord	2–1	Vitesse	Rotterdam
16:45 CEST (UTC+2)	Botteghin 47'; Van Persie 87' (red card) 90+1'	Report	Bero 32'; Büttner (yellow card) 63'; Bruns (red card) 63'; Foor (yellow card) 86'; Doekhi (red card) 90+5'	Stadium: De Kuip; Attendance: 45,000; Referee: Serdar Gözübüyük

7 October 2018 8	Vitesse	4–0	Heracles Almelo	Arnhem
14:30 CEST (UTC+2)	Foor 11'; Darfalou 42', 66'; Clarke-Salter (yellow card) 58'; Büttner 73' (pen.)	Report	Osman (yellow card) 44'; Dalmau (yellow card) 54'; Duarte (yellow card) 72'	Stadium: GelreDome; Attendance: 14,338; Referee: Jochem Kamphuis

20 October 2018 9	Excelsior	2–0	Vitesse	Rotterdam
18:30 CEST (UTC+2)	Clark 40' (og.); Mattheij 70'; Stevens (red card) 90+1'	Report		Stadium: Van Donge & De Roo Stadion; Attendance: 4,397; Referee: Björn Kuipers

28 October 2018 10	Vitesse	2–1	Fortuna Sittard	Arnhem
12:15 CEST (UTC+2)	Van der Werff 12'; Bero (yellow card) 58' (goal) 66'; Foor (yellow card) 60'; Clark (yellow card) 68'	Report	Vidigal 45+2'; Niňaj (yellow card) 50'; Essers (yellow card) 69'	Stadium: GelreDome; Attendance: 15,879; Referee: Dennis Higler

3 November 2018 11	PSV	1–0	Vitesse	Eindhoven
18:30 CET (UTC+1)	Bergwijn (yellow card) 42'; De Jong 69'; Dumfries (yellow card) 86'	Report	Doekhi (red card) 14'; Linssen (yellow card) 15'; Ødegaard (yellow card) 62'	Stadium: Philips Stadion; Attendance: 34,100; Referee: Serdar Gözübüyük

10 November 2018 12	Vitesse	2–1	Utrecht	Arnhem
19:45 CET (UTC+1)	Linssen 58'; Ødegaard 64'; Büttner (yellow card) 76'	Report	Kerk (yellow card) 42'; Klaiber (yellow card) 55'; Dessers 78'; Görtler (yellow card) 82'	Stadium: GelreDome; Attendance: 15,131; Referee: Danny Makkelie

25 November 2018 13	Willem II	1–3	Vitesse	Tilburg
14:30 CET (UTC+1)	Özbiliz (yellow card) 87'; Sol 87' (pen.); Lewis (yellow card) 90+2'	Report	Bero 13'; Darfalou 35'; Linssen 44'; Thelander (yellow card) 86'; Eduardo (yellow card) 87'	Stadium: Koning Willem II Stadion; Attendance: 11,879; Referee: Björn Kuipers

1 December 2018 14	Vitesse	1–1	Emmen	Arnhem
18:30 CET (UTC+1)	Linssen 31'; Serero (yellow card) 90+3'	Report	Bijl (yellow card) 17'; Cavlan 51' (yellow card) 81'; Klok (yellow card) 87'; Chacón (yellow card) 90+3'; Marinus (yellow card) 90+3'	Stadium: GelreDome; Attendance: 15,000; Referee: Siemen Mulder

9 December 2018 15	NAC Breda	2–1	Vitesse	Breda
16:45 CET (UTC+1)	Te Vrede 45+1'; Mets (yellow card) 82'; Verschueren 84'	Report	Bero (yellow card) 45' (yellow-red card) 90+2'; Linssen 72'	Stadium: Rat Verlegh Stadion; Attendance: 18,280; Referee: Allard Lindhout

15 December 2018 16	Vitesse	2–1	VVV	Arnhem
20:45 CET (UTC+1)	Ødegaard 32' (yellow card) 52'; Clarke-Salter (yellow card) 45+2'; Darfalou 80'; Foor (yellow card) 90'	Report	Mlapa (yellow card) 45+2' (goal) 76'; Joosten (yellow card) 82'	Stadium: GelreDome; Attendance: 13,249; Referee: Christian Baax

23 December 2018 17	De Graafschap	2–2	Vitesse	Doetinchem
14:30 CET (UTC+1)	Olijve 12'; Nieuwpoort (yellow card) 45+4'; Narsingh 58'; Vet (yellow card) 89'	Report	Ødegaard 43'; Büttner (yellow card) 45+4'; Bero 65'; Linssen (yellow card) 67'; Foor (yellow card) 89'; Thelander (yellow card) 90+3'	Stadium: De Vijverberg; Attendance: 12,600; Referee: Björn Kuipers

18 January 2019 18	Vitesse	3–2	Excelsior	Arnhem
20:00 CET (UTC+1)	Foor 6'; Linssen 36'; Darfalou (yellow card) 61' van der Werff 67' (yellow card) 72'	Report	Bruins (yellow card) 17'; Edwards 51'; Schouten 69'	Stadium: GelreDome; Referee: Edwin van de Graaf

27 January 2019 19	Fortuna Sittard	2–1	Vitesse	Sittard
12:15 CET (UTC+1)	Essers (yellow card) 23'; Diemers (yellow card) 27'; Heerings (yellow card) 36'; Hutten 74'; Dobos (yellow card) 90'; Stokkers 90+2'	Report	Linssen 7'; Bero (yellow card) 45'; Foor (yellow card) 55'	Stadium: Fortuna Sittard Stadion; Attendance: 8,123; Referee: Martin Perez

2 February 2019 20	Vitesse	2–2	Heerenveen	Arnhem
18:30 CET (UTC+1)	Ali 24'; Linssen 58' (yellow card) 81'; Büttner (yellow card) 84'; Clark (yellow card) 90+4'	Report	Vlap 14'; Lammers 90+3'	Stadium: GelreDome; Attendance: 15,342; Referee: Martin van den Kerkhof

10 February 2019 21	Groningen	2–1	Vitesse	Groningen
14:30 CET (UTC+1)	Sierhuis 13'; Chabot (yellow card) 87'; El Hankouri 90+3'	Report	Darfalou 34'	Stadium: Euroborg; Attendance: 16,498; Referee: Björn Kuipers

16 February 2019 22	Vitesse	3–2	Willem II	Arnhem
20:45 CET (UTC+1)	Linssen 5'; Darfalou (yellow card) 11'; Foor (yellow card) 28'; Bero (yellow card) 54'; Ødegaard 59'; Clark 79'	Report	Meißner (yellow card) 48'; Isak 61'; Crowley (yellow card) 64'; Pavlidis 83'; Kristinsson (yellow card) 90+3'	Stadium: GelreDome; Attendance: 14,186; Referee: Allard Lindhout

24 February 2019 23	Emmen	0–3	Vitesse	Emmen
14:30 CET (UTC+1)	Bannink (yellow card) 52'; Bijl (yellow card) 70'; Neidhart (yellow card) 87'	Report	Dauda 13' (yellow card) 45+3'; Foor (yellow card) 19' (goal) 89'; Ødegaard 71'	Stadium: De Oude Meerdijk; Attendance: 8,301; Referee: Edwin van de Graaf

2 March 2019 24	Vitesse	4–1	NAC Breda	Arnhem
20:45 CET (UTC+1)	Buitink 54'; Clark (yellow card) 55' van der Werff 77'; Büttner 86'; Bero 90+1'	Report	Verschueren (yellow card) 24'; Korte 29'; Klomp (yellow card) 65' (yellow-red card) 88'	Stadium: GelreDome; Attendance: 12,757; Referee: Joey Kooij

10 March 2019 25	Vitesse	1–1	Feyenoord	Arnhem
14:30 CET (UTC+1)	Dauda 47'; Bero (yellow card) 63'	Report	Berghuis (yellow card) 35'; Kökçü 45+1'	Stadium: GelreDome; Attendance: 17,208; Referee: Jeroen Manschot

16 March 2019 26	Heracles Almelo	3–2	Vitesse	Almelo
20:45 CET (UTC+1)	Dalmau 5', 26'; Peterson (yellow card) 45+3'; Van den Buijs 61'	Report	Foor 7'; Clark (yellow card) 25' (yellow-red card) 38'; Bero 45+3' (pen.); Büttner (yellow card) 89'	Stadium: Polman Stadion; Attendance: 11,086; Referee: Björn Kuipers

30 March 2019 27	ADO Den Haag	3–3	Vitesse	The Hague
18:30 CEST (UTC+2)	Becker 7'; Immers 31', 76'	Report	Buitink 21', 27', 43'; Bero (yellow card) 59'	Stadium: Cars Jeans Stadion; Attendance: 13,721; Referee: Siemen Mulder

2 April 2019 28	Vitesse	2–2	AZ	Arnhem
18:30 CEST (UTC+2)	Bero 48'; Büttner (yellow card) 56'; Buitink 77'; Dauda (yellow card) 84'	Report	Vlaar 7' (yellow card) 78'; Koopmeiners 44' (yellow card) 90+5'; Midtsjø (yellow card) 69'; Ouwejan (yellow card) 89'	Stadium: GelreDome; Attendance: 14,162; Referee: Allard Lindhout

7 April 2019 29	Vitesse	3–3	PSV Eindhoven	Arnhem
16:45 CEST (UTC+2)	Serero 13'; Pasveer (yellow card) 40'; Ødegaard 59'; Karavayev (yellow card) 79'; Matavž 83' van der Werff (red card) 89'	Report	Rosario (yellow card) 16'; Lozano 41' (pen.), 90+1' (pen.); Viergever (yellow card) 60' de Jong 70'; Dumfries (yellow card) 77'	Stadium: GelreDome; Attendance: 21,248; Referee: Serdar Gözübüyük

14 April 2019 30	Utrecht	0–0	Vitesse	Utrecht
16:45 CEST (UTC+2)	Klaiber (yellow card) 33'; Janssen (yellow card) 37'; Gustafson (yellow card) 66'	Report	Serero (yellow card) 53'; Clarke-Salter (yellow card) 90+3'	Stadium: Stadion Galgenwaard; Attendance: 22,064; Referee: Dennis Higler

20 April 2019 31	Vitesse	4–1	PEC Zwolle	Arnhem
19:45 CEST (UTC+2)	Linssen 9', 47', 77'; Büttner (red card) 27'; Dauda 73'	Report	Thy 23' van Polen 43'; Ehizibue (yellow card) 76'	Stadium: GelreDome; Attendance: 15,387; Referee: Björn Kuipers

23 April 2019 32	Ajax	4–2	Vitesse	Amsterdam
20:45 CEST (UTC+2)	Ziyech 41'; Tadić 54' (pen.), 80' (pen.) de Ligt 58'; Veltman (yellow card) 69' van de Beek (yellow card) 86'	Report	Bero (yellow card) 53' (yellow-red card) 90+1'; Foor 66' van der Werff (yellow card) 80'; Darfalou 82'	Stadium: Johan Cruyff Arena; Referee: Jochem Kamphuis

12 May 2019 33	Vitesse	6–1	De Graafschap	Arnhem
14:30 CEST (UTC+2)				Stadium: GelreDome

15 April 2019 34	VVV	1–3	Vitesse	Venlo
19:30 CEST (UTC+2)				Stadium: De Koel

=== KNVB Cup ===
26 September 2018 First round	RKAV Volendam	1–2	Vitesse	Volendam
19:45 CEST (UTC+2)	N.Tuyp (yellow card) 39'; Tol 84'; J.Veerman (yellow card) 85'	Report	Van der Werff 15'; Darfalou 43'; Bero (yellow card) 65'	Stadium: KWABO-stadion; Attendance: 2,500; Referee: Freek van Herk

31 October 2018 Second round	Heracles Almelo	0–2	Vitesse	Almelo
18:30 CET (UTC+1)	Czyborra (yellow card) 29'; Osman (yellow card) 34'	Report	Ødegaard 40'; Buitink 89'	Stadium: Polman Stadion; Attendance: 10,037; Referee: Siemen Mulder

20 December 2018 Third round	Kozakken Boys	1–2	Vitesse	Werkendam
18:30 CET (UTC+1)	Jakoba 59'; L.Bot (yellow card) 77'	Report	Bero 12'; Ødegaard (yellow card) 30', (goal) 90+2'	Stadium: Sportpark De Zwaaier; Attendance: 2,200; Referee: Erwin Blank

22 January 2019 Quarter-final	AZ	2–0	Vitesse	Alkmaar
20:45 CET (UTC+1)	Stengs 40'; Til 54'	Report	Ødegaard (yellow card) 67'	Stadium: AFAS Stadion; Attendance: 8,165; Referee: Dennis Higler

=== UEFA Europa League ===
On 20 June 2018, the second qualifying round draw was confirmed with Vitesse facing the eventual winners of the first qualifying round tie between Racing FC and Viitorul Constanța in July and August.

==== Qualifying rounds ====
26 July 2018 Second qualifying round 1st leg	Viitorul Constanța (Romania)	2–2	(Netherlands) Vitesse	Ovidiu, Romania
17:00 CEST (UTC+2)	Drăguș 44', 49'; Artean (red card) 79'	Report	Foor (yellow card) 37'; Matavž 54'; Linssen 72'	Stadium: Stadionul Viitorul; Attendance: 2,543; Referee: Davide Massa (Italy)

2 August 2018 Second qualifying round 2nd leg	Vitesse (Netherlands)	3–1 (5–3 agg.)	(Romania) Viitorul Constanța	Arnhem, Netherlands
20:00 EEST (UTC+3)	Matavž 23'; Büttner (yellow card) 41'; Linssen 48'; Beerens 77' (yellow card) 87'	Report	De Nooijer (yellow card) 18'; Houri (yellow card) 39'; Drăguș 50'	Stadium: GelreDome; Attendance: 9,876; Referee: Kevin Clancy (Scotland)

9 August 2018 Third qualifying round 1st leg	Vitesse (Netherlands)	0–1	(Switzerland) Basel	Arnhem, Netherlands
20:00 EEST (UTC+3)	Karavayev (yellow card) 65'; Gong (yellow card) 73'; Van der Werff (yellow card) 83'	Report	Van Wolfswinkel (yellow card) 60' (goal) 90+3'; Widmer (yellow card) 83'	Stadium: GelreDome; Attendance: 11,532; Referee: Georgi Kabakov (Bulgaria)

16 August 2018 Third qualifying round 2nd leg	Basel (Switzerland)	1–0 (2–0 agg.)	(Netherlands) Vitesse	Basel, Switzerland
20:00 EEST (UTC+3)	Ajeti 30'; Petretta (yellow card) 78'	Report	Clarke-Salter (red card) 26'	Stadium: St. Jakob-Park; Attendance: 12,334; Referee: Daniel Siebert (Germany)

== Statistics ==
As of match played 23 April 2019

=== Appearances and goals ===
No.	Pos	Nat	Player	Total		Eredivisie		KNVB Cup		Europa League	
No.	Pos	Nat	Player	Apps	Goals	Apps	Goals	Apps	Goals	Apps	Goals
1	GK	(Portugal) POR	Eduardo	34	0	27	0	3	0	4	0
3	DF	(Netherlands) NED	Maikel van der Werff	26	4	20+1	3	2	1	2+1	0
5	DF	(England) ENG	Max Clark	25	1	16+5	1	3	0	0+1	0
7	MF	(Netherlands) NED	Roy Beerens	22	2	12+4	1	2	0	4	1
8	DF	(Russia) RUS	Vyacheslav Karavayev	39	0	31	0	3+1	0	4	0
9	FW	(Slovenia) SLO	Tim Matavž	17	8	7+6	6	0	0	4	2
10	FW	(Ghana) GHA	Mohammed Dauda	12	3	6+6	3	0	0	0	0
11	MF	(Netherlands) NED	Bryan Linssen	35	14	26+2	12	3	0	4	2
13	FW	(Algeria) ALG	Oussama Darfalou	27	7	14+9	6	3	1	0+1	0
14	DF	(England) ENG	Jake Clarke-Salter	35	1	27	1	2+2	0	4	0
17	MF	(South Africa) RSA	Thulani Serero	36	1	28+1	1	3	0	4	0
18	MF	(Norway) NOR	Martin Ødegaard	33	8	27+2	6	4	2	0	0
19	MF	(Nigeria) NGR	Hilary Gong	11	0	0+6	0	0+2	0	0+3	0
21	MF	(Slovakia) SVK	Matúš Bero	35	9	29	8	3	1	2+1	0
22	GK	(Netherlands) NED	Remko Pasveer	6	0	5	0	1	0	0	0
23	MF	(Saudi Arabia) KSA	Mukhtar Ali	6	1	2+4	1	0	0	0	0
25	MF	(Netherlands) NED	Navarone Foor	36	5	25+3	5	4	0	4	0
26	DF	(Denmark) DEN	Rasmus Thelander	13	0	5+4	0	1	0	2+1	0
28	DF	(Netherlands) NED	Alexander Büttner	33	2	25+2	2	1+1	0	4	0
29	FW	(Netherlands) NED	Thomas Buitink	17	6	6+9	5	1+1	1	0	0
30	DF	(Netherlands) NED	Danilho Doekhi	21	0	13+5	0	3	0	0	0
39	FW	(Netherlands) NED	Richonell Margaret	5	0	0+4	0	0+1	0	0	0
Players away on loan :
2	DF	(Netherlands) NED	Khalid Karami	1	0	0	0	1	0	0	0
10	MF	(Netherlands) NED	Thomas Bruns	12	0	1+7	0	1	0	2+1	0
Players who left Vitesse during the season:
16	MF	(Netherlands) NED	Mitchell van Bergen	4	0	0+3	0	0	0	0+1	0

=== Goal scorers ===
Place	Position	Nation	Number	Name	Eredivisie	KNVB Cup	Europa League	Total
1	MF	(Netherlands)	11	Bryan Linssen	12	0	2	14
2	MF	(Slovakia)	21	Matúš Bero	8	1	0	9
3	MF	(Norway)	18	Martin Ødegaard	6	2	0	8
3	FW	(Slovenia)	9	Tim Matavž	6	0	2	8
5	FW	(Algeria)	13	Oussama Darfalou	6	1	0	7
6	FW	(Netherlands)	29	Thomas Buitink	5	1	0	6
7	MF	(Netherlands)	25	Navarone Foor	5	0	0	5
8	DF	(Netherlands)	3	Maikel van der Werff	3	1	0	4
9	FW	(Ghana)	10	Mohammed Dauda	3	0	0	3
10	DF	(Netherlands)	28	Alexander Büttner	2	0	0	2
10	MF	(Netherlands)	7	Roy Beerens	1	0	1	2
12	DF	(England)	14	Jake Clarke-Salter	1	0	0	1
12	MF	(Saudi Arabia)	23	Mukhtar Ali	1	0	0	1
12	DF	(England)	5	Max Clark	1	0	0	1
12	MF	(South Africa)	17	Thulani Serero	1	0	0	1
				TOTALS	61	6	5	72

=== Disciplinary record ===
Number	Nation	Position	Name	Eredivisie		KNVB Cup		Europa League		Total	
Number	Nation	Position	Name	Yellow card	Red card	Yellow card	Red card	Yellow card	Red card	Yellow card	Red card
1	(Portugal)	GK	Eduardo	1	0	0	0	0	0	1	0
3	(Netherlands)	DF	Maikel van der Werff	6	2	0	0	1	0	1	0
5	(England)	DF	Max Clark	6	1	0	0	0	0	1	0
7	(Netherlands)	MF	Roy Beerens	0	0	0	0	1	0	1	0
8	(Russia)	DF	Vyacheslav Karavayev	1	0	0	0	1	0	1	0
10	(Ghana)	FW	Mohammed Dauda	2	0	0	0	0	0	1	0
11	(Netherlands)	MF	Bryan Linssen	5	0	0	0	0	0	1	0
13	(Algeria)	FW	Oussama Darfalou	2	0	0	0	0	0	1	0
14	(England)	DF	Jake Clarke-Salter	3	0	0	0	0	1	0	1
17	(South Africa)	MF	Thulani Serero	3	0	0	0	0	0	1	0
18	(Norway)	MF	Martin Ødegaard	2	0	2	0	0	0	2	0
19	(Nigeria)	MF	Hilary Gong	0	0	0	0	1	0	1	0
21	(Slovakia)	MF	Matúš Bero	12	2	1	0	0	0	1	0
23	(Netherlands)	GK	Remko Pasveer	1	0	0	0	0	0	1	0
25	(Netherlands)	MF	Navarone Foor	8	0	0	0	1	0	1	0
26	(Denmark)	DF	Rasmus Thelander	2	0	0	0	0	0	1	0
28	(Netherlands)	DF	Alexander Büttner	7	1	0	0	1	0	1	0
30	(Netherlands)	DF	Danilho Doekhi	0	2	0	0	0	0	0	2
Players away on loan:
10	(Netherlands)	MF	Thomas Bruns	0	1	0	0	0	0	0	1
Players who left Vitesse during the season:
			TOTALS	61	9	3	0	6	1	70	10
