= Eduardo Carvalho =

Portuguese footballer (born 1982)

Eduardo
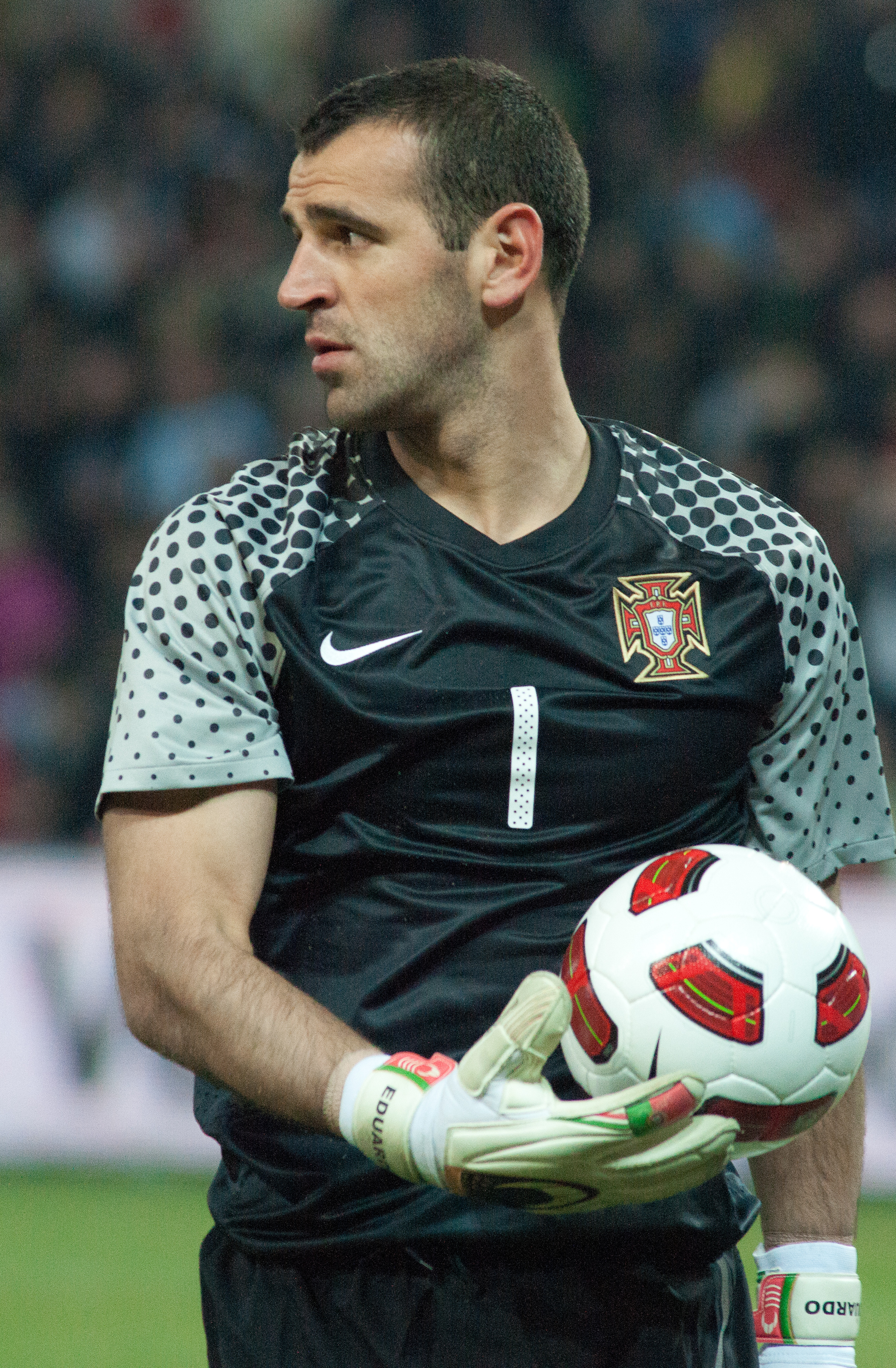
- Eduardo playing for Portugal in 2011

Personal information
- Full name: Eduardo dos Reis Carvalho
- Date of birth: 19 September 1982 (age 44)
- Place of birth: Mirandela, Portugal
- Height: 1.87 m (6 ft 2 in)
- Position: Goalkeeper

Team information
- Current team: S.C. Braga (goalkeeping coach)

Youth career
- 1992–1996: Mirandela
- 1996–1997: Vitória Guimarães
- 1997–1998: Mirandela
- 1998–2001: Braga

Senior career*
Years	Team	Apps	(Gls)
2001–2006	Braga B	113	(0)
2006–2010	Braga	60	(0)
2007	→ Beira-Mar (loan)	15	(0)
2007–2008	→ Vitória Setúbal (loan)	30	(0)
2010–2014	Genoa	37	(0)
2011–2012	→ Benfica (loan)	1	(0)
2012–2013	→ İstanbul BB (loan)	33	(0)
2013–2014	→ Braga (loan)	29	(0)
2014–2016	Dinamo Zagreb	70	(0)
2016–2019	Chelsea	0	(0)
2018–2019	→ Vitesse (loan)	27	(0)
2019–2020	Braga	4	(0)
Total		419	(0)

International career
2008	Portugal U21	2	(0)
2009–2016	Portugal	36	(0)

Managerial career
- 2020–: Braga (goalkeeping coach)
Medal record
Men's football
Representing Portugal
UEFA European Championship
Winner	2016 France
Bronze medal – third place	2012 Poland-Ukraine
- * Club domestic league appearances and goals

Eduardo dos Reis Carvalho ComM (Portuguese pronunciation: [iˈðwaɾðu kɐɾˈvaʎu]; born 19 September 1982), known simply as Eduardo, is a Portuguese former footballer who played as a goalkeeper.

He appeared in 138 Primeira Liga games over 11 seasons, almost always representing Braga. He also played professionally in Italy, Turkey, Croatia, England and the Netherlands.

After winning the first of his 36 caps for Portugal in 2009, Eduardo was part of the squads in two World Cups and as many European Championships, starting in the 2010 edition of the former tournament and winning the 2016 installment of the latter.

== Club career ==
=== Braga ===
Eduardo was born in Mirandela, Bragança District. A product of Braga's youth system, he first appeared in the Primeira Liga during 2006–07 when he served a six-month loan at Beira-Mar. In the following season he was also loaned, this time to Vitória de Setúbal, and was as a key player in a Carlos Carvalhal-led side that won the inaugural Taça da Liga and thus qualified for the 2008–09 UEFA Cup, with a Player of the match display in the final against Sporting CP where he saved three attempts in the penalty shootout.

Eduardo returned to Braga for the 2008–09 campaign, playing in all the league matches and also in the Minho team's UEFA Cup round-of-16 run. The same happened in the following season – with them finishing in their best-ever position, second – as he only conceded 20 goals, joint-best in the competition.

=== Genoa ===
On 7 July 2010, Eduardo signed a four-year contract with Serie A's Genoa for €4.8 million, replacing departed Marco Amelia. Braga would also receive a 25% future transfer fee if Genoa sold the player.

Eduardo started all the games but one for the Italians in his first and only season, in a final midtable position. In July 2011 he returned to his country and joined Benfica on loan, with the Lisbon club having an option to buy at the end of the campaign; during his spell at the Estádio da Luz, he appeared in only nine competitive matches.

On 26 June 2012, Eduardo signed for İstanbul Büyükşehir Belediyespor in a temporary deal, being coached by Carvalhal at the Süper Lig team. The following summer he returned to both Portugal and Braga, while still owned by Genoa.

=== Later career ===
On 27 June 2014, Eduardo joined several compatriots at Croatian side Dinamo Zagreb after agreeing to a three-year contract. On 25 August 2016, after 95 competitive appearances, he signed with Premier League club Chelsea on a one-year deal, being brought in to provide experienced cover and competition to Thibaut Courtois and Asmir Begović.

In spite of his team being crowned league champions, Eduardo did not receive a medal as he did not appear in any games. He agreed to a one-year contract extension on 23 May 2017, with technical director Michael Emenalo calling him "a model professional".

Despite being listed on Chelsea's released list following the conclusion of 2017–18, Eduardo signed a new one-year contract in July. Early in the same month, he agreed to join Dutch club Vitesse on a season-long loan. He made his competitive debut on 26 July 2018, in a 2–2 draw away to Viitorul Constanța for the Europa League second qualifying round.

On 1 July 2019, after no official matches during his stint at Chelsea, Eduardo left the club. The previous week, he had already agreed to a two-year deal at Braga. He played for one season before announcing his retirement at the age of 37.

== International career ==
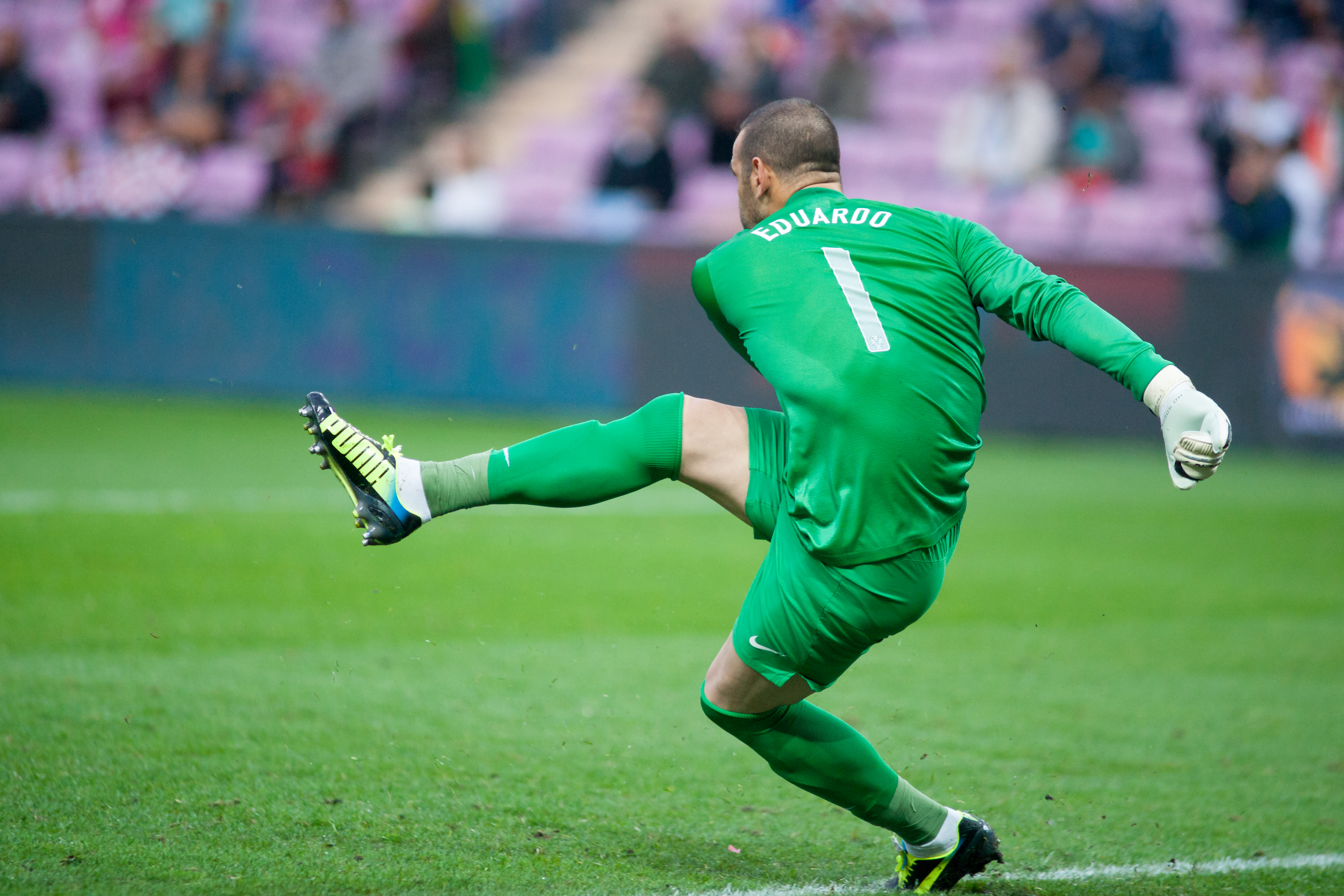
Eduardo in action for Portugal against Croatia in 2013

After UEFA Euro 2008, Eduardo was called up by new Portugal national team coach Carlos Queiroz for the 2010 FIFA World Cup qualifiers against Malta and Denmark, where he was understudy to Quim. He made his full debut on 11 February 2009 in a friendly match with Finland, playing the first 60 minutes in a 1–0 home win, and remained the starter throughout the remainder of the qualifying campaign; he also started in the final stages in South Africa, keeping clean sheets against Ivory Coast, North Korea and Brazil and only conceding in the round-of-16 loss against eventual champions Spain (0–1), where he saved many shots from the opposition, mostly by David Villa.

After being relegated to the bench at his club, Eduardo met the same fate in the national team to Rui Patrício, and both finished the UEFA Euro 2012 qualifying campaign with five games as Portugal qualified for the finals. He was also named in the squad of 23 for the 2014 World Cup, but only actually played five minutes in the last group stage match against Ghana, coming on for injured Beto.

An unused member as the side won Euro 2016 in France and Patrício starred, Eduardo made his final international appearance on 1 September 2016 in his first such match for over two years. He kept a clean sheet in the 5–0 friendly win over Gibraltar at the Estádio do Bessa.

== Career statistics ==
=== Club ===
Club	Season	League			Cup		League Cup		Europe		Other		Total	
Club	Season	Division	Apps	Goals	Apps	Goals	Apps	Goals	Apps	Goals	Apps	Goals	Apps	Goals
Braga	2000–01	Primeira Liga	0	0	0	0	—		—		0	0	0	0
Braga	2001–02	Primeira Liga	0	0	0	0	—		—		0	0	0	0
Braga	2002–03	Primeira Liga	0	0	0	0	—		—		0	0	0	0
Braga	2003–04	Primeira Liga	0	0	0	0	—		—		0	0	0	0
Braga	2004–05	Primeira Liga	0	0	0	0	—		—		0	0	0	0
Braga	2005–06	Primeira Liga	0	0	0	0	—		—		0	0	0	0
Braga	2006–07	Primeira Liga	—		—		—		—		—		—	
Braga	2007–08	Primeira Liga	—		—		—		—		—		—	
Braga	2008–09	Primeira Liga	30	0	2	0	1	0	14 (Note: Twelve appearances in UEFA Cup and two appearances in UEFA Intertoto Cup)	0	—		47	0
Braga	2009–10	Primeira Liga	30	0	2	0	0	0	2 (Note: Appearances in UEFA Europa League)	0	—		34	0
Braga	Total		60	0	4	0	1	0	16	0	0	0	81	0
Beira-Mar (loan)	2006–07	Primeira Liga	15	0	5	0	—		—		—		20	0
Vitória de Setúbal (loan)	2007–08	Primeira Liga	30	0	5	0	8	0	—		—		43	0
Genoa	2010–11	Serie A	37	0	0	0	0	0	—		—		37	0
Benfica (loan)	2011–12	Primeira Liga	1	0	3	0	5	0	0	0	—		9	0
İstanbul BB (loan)	2012–13	Süper Lig	33	0	0	0	—		—		—		33	0
Braga (loan)	2013–14	Primeira Liga	29	0	5	0	2	0	2	0	—		38	0
Dinamo Zagreb	2014–15	Prva HNL	34	0	0	0	—		12 (Note: Four appearances in UEFA Champions League and eight appearances in UEFA Europa League)	0	1	0	47	0
Dinamo Zagreb	2015–16	Prva HNL	32	0	0	0	—		12 (Note: Appearances in UEFA Champions League)	0	—		44	0
Dinamo Zagreb	2016–17	Prva HNL	4	0	0	0	—		4	0	—		8	0
Dinamo Zagreb	Total		70	0	0	0	—		28	0	1	0	99	0
Chelsea	2016–17	Premier League	0	0	0	0	0	0	—		—		0	0
Chelsea	2017–18	Premier League	0	0	0	0	0	0	0	0	0	0	0	0
Chelsea U23	2017–18	—	—		—		—		—		1 (Note: Appearances in EFL Trophy)	0	1	0
Vitesse (loan)	2018–19	Eredivisie	27	0	3	0	—		4	0	—		34	0
Braga	2019–20	Primeira Liga	4	0	2	0	0	0	3	0	—		9	0
Career total			306	0	27	0	16	0	53	0	2	0	404	0

=== International ===
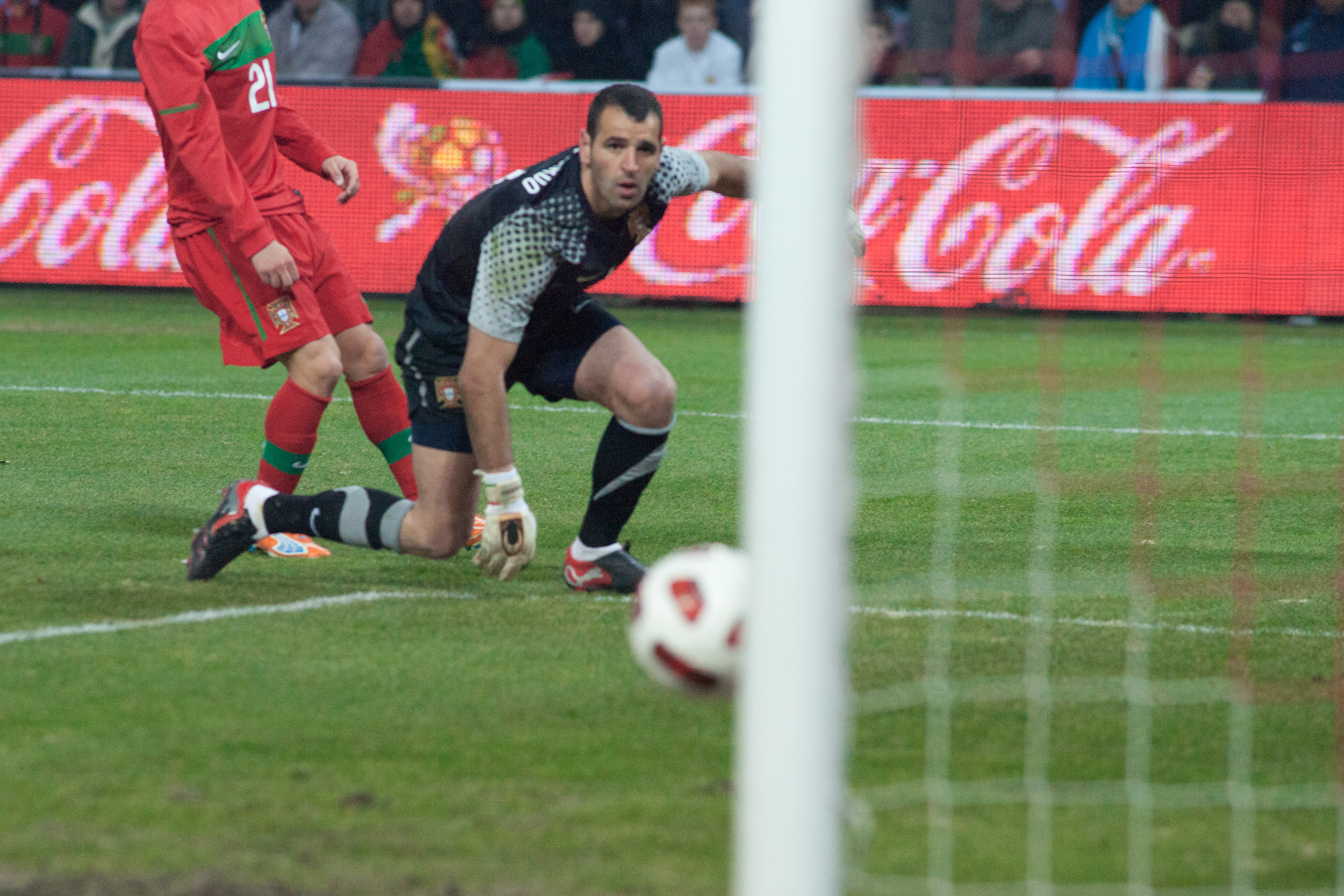
Eduardo conceding a goal against Argentina in February 2011

Portugal
Year	Apps	Goals
2009	11	0
2010	13	0
2011	3	0
2012	2	0
2013	2	0
2014	4	0
2015	0	0
2016	1	0
Total	36	0

== Honours ==
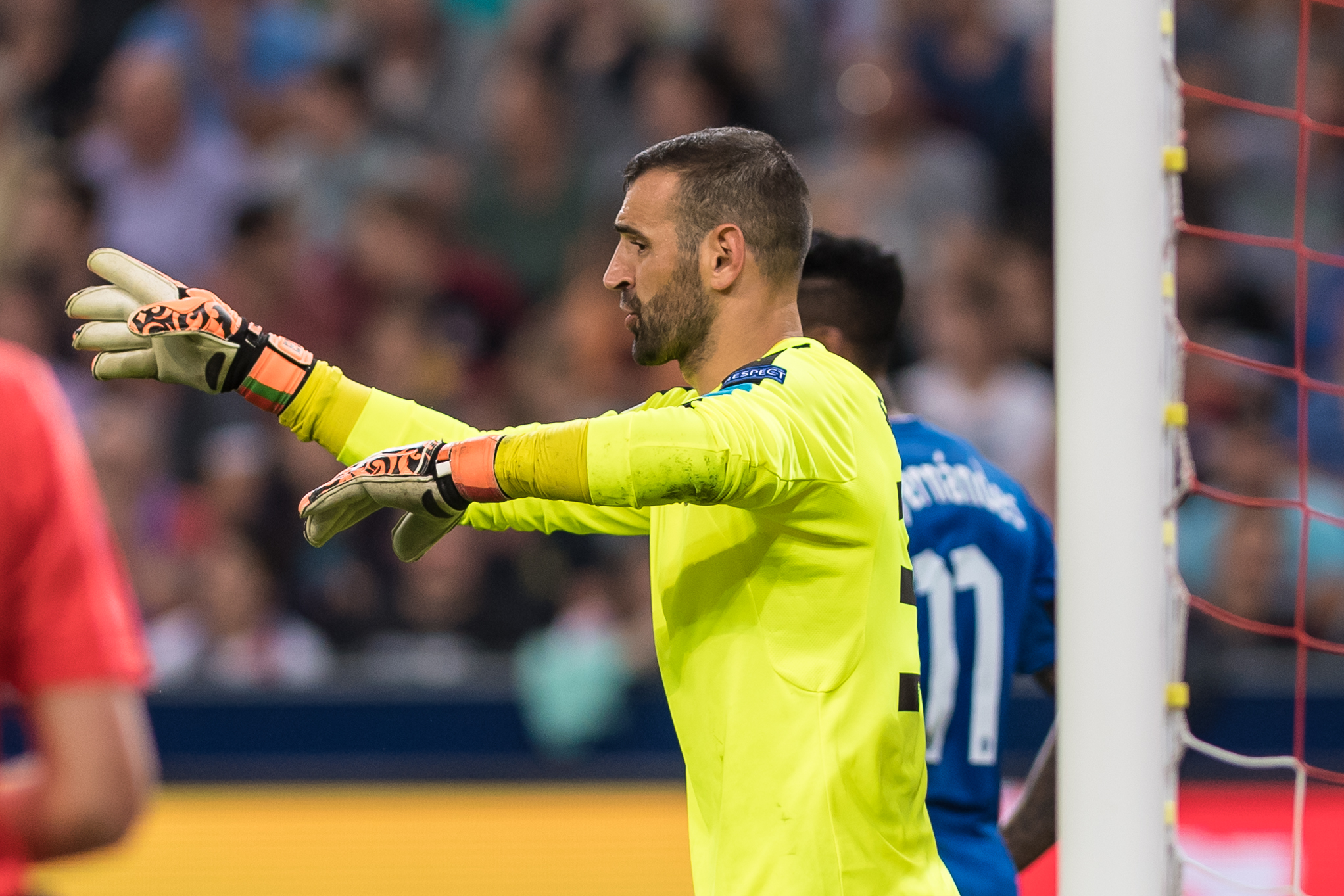
Eduardo in action for Dinamo Zagreb against Red Bull Salzburg in August 2016

Vitória de Setúbal

- Taça da Liga: 2007–08

Braga

- UEFA Intertoto Cup: 2008

Benfica

- Taça da Liga: 2011–12

Dinamo Zagreb

- Croatian First Football League: 2014–15, 2015–16
- Croatian Football Cup: 2014–15, 2015–16
- Croatian Football Super Cup runner-up: 2014

Portugal

- UEFA European Championship: 2016

Individual

- Primeira Liga Breakthrough Player of the Year: 2006–07

Orders

- Commander of the Order of Merit
