= Navarone Foor =

Dutch footballer (born 1992)

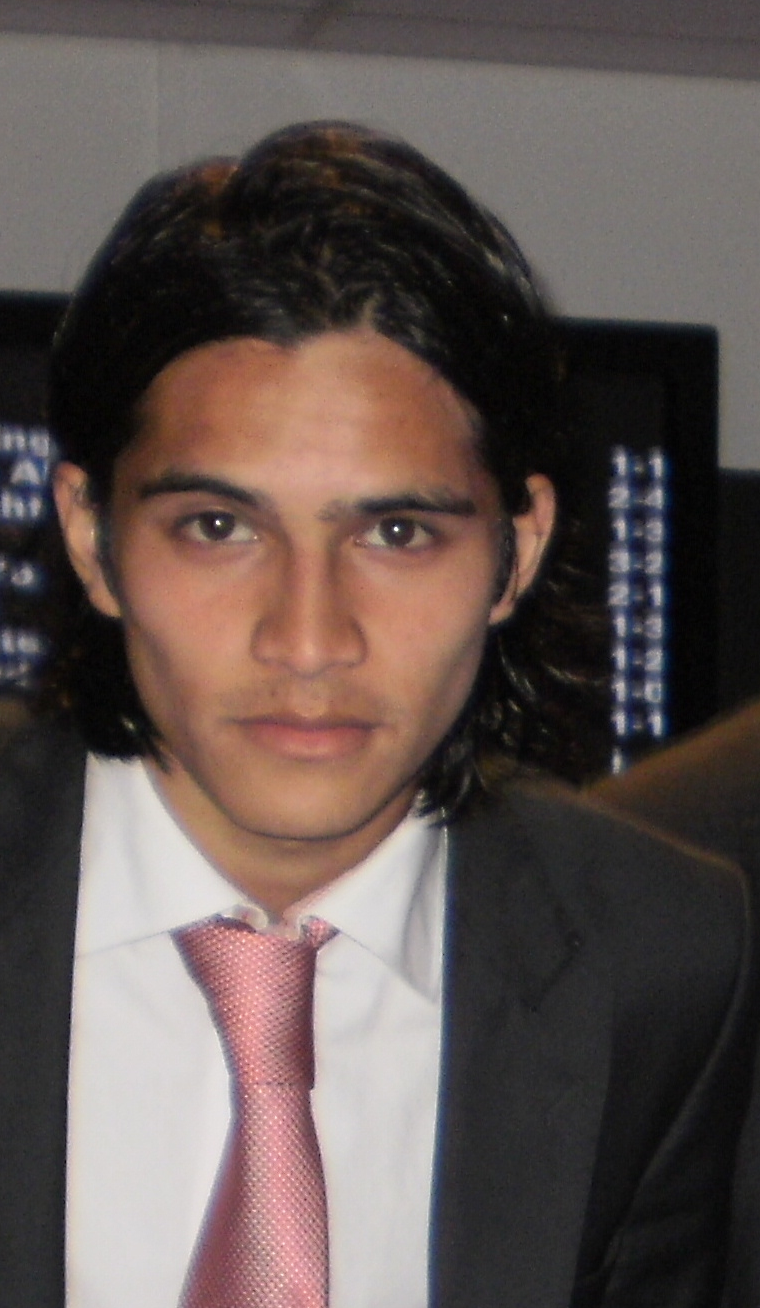
- Foor in 2012

Personal information
- Full name: Navarone Chesney Kai Foor
- Date of birth: 4 February 1992 (age 34)
- Place of birth: Opheusden, Netherlands
- Height: 1.75 m (5 ft 9 in)
- Positions: Attacking midfielder; winger

Team information
- Current team: PSM Makassar
- Number: 10

Youth career
- –2009: Opheusden
- 2009–2011: NEC

Senior career*
| Years | Team | Apps | (Gls) |
| 2011–2016 | NEC | 154 | (15) |
| 2016–2020 | Vitesse | 106 | (14) |
| 2016 | Jong Vitesse | 1 | (0) |
| 2020 | Ittihad Kalba | 5 | (0) |
| 2020–2022 | Pafos | 60 | (1) |
| 2022–2023 | Riga | 11 | (0) |
| 2023 | Cambuur | 15 | (2) |
| 2023–2024 | Karmiotissa | 15 | (2) |
| 2024 | Bandırmaspor | 8 | (1) |
| 2025–2026 | VVV | 49 | (4) |
| 2026– | PSM Makassar | 6 | (0) |

International career
| 2011 | Netherlands U19 | 1 | (0) |
| 2012–2013 | Netherlands U20 | 8 | (1) |
| 2012 | Netherlands U21 | 1 | (0) |
- * Club domestic league appearances and goals as of 16 October 2026

Navarone Chesney Kai Foor (born 4 February 1992) is a Dutch professional footballer who plays as an attacking midfielder or winger for Super League club PSM Makassar.

== Club career ==
=== NEC ===
Born in Opheusden, Foor left local side Opheusden in 2009 to join NEC. On 6 August 2011, Foor made his NEC debut in a 2–2 draw with Heerenveen, in which he replaced Lasse Schöne in the 79th minute. On 10 September 2011, Foor was given his first NEC start against local rivals De Graafschap. The game resulted in a 1–0 victory for De Graafschap and Foor played until the 71st minute before being replaced by Manchester City loanee Abdisalam Ibrahim. On 22 April 2012, Foor scored his first NEC goal in a 2–1 defeat to PSV. On 10 May 2012, Foor continued his impressive form with a goal against rivals Vitesse, which eventually finished a 3–2 victory to NEC.

Foor quickly became a fan favourite at NEC with his consistent performances spread over five years at the club. Foor played a big part in NEC's Eerste Divisie triumph, in which he netted seven times from 37 appearances. Foor went on to make 154 league appearances for NEC, scoring on 15 occasions.

=== Vitesse ===
On 13 May 2016, Foor joined fierce rivals Vitesse on a four-year deal on a free transfer after his contract expired at NEC. On 11 September 2016, Foor made his Vitesse debut in a 1–0 away defeat to Ajax, featuring for 64 minutes before being replaced by Nathan. On 23 October 2016, Foor scored his first goal for Vitesse in a 1–1 draw against former club NEC, opening the scoring in the 38th minute.

He played as Vitesse won the final of the KNVB Beker 2–0 against AZ Alkmaar on 30 April 2017 to help the club, three-time runners up, to the title for the first time in its 125-year history.

=== Ittihad Kalba ===
On 3 February 2020, Ittihad Kalba signed Foor from Vitesse.

=== Riga FC ===
On 28 August 2022, Foor signed for Latvian Higher League club Riga FC having spent two seasons in Cyprus with Pafos FC.

=== Cambuur ===
On 28 January 2023, Foor signed for Cambuur on a contract until the end of the season.

=== VVV-Venlo ===
On 31 January 2025, Foor signed a six-month contract with VVV-Venlo, with an option to extend for a year.

=== PSM Makassar ===
On 13 August 2026, Indonesia club PSM Makassar announced the signing of Foor.

== International career ==
Foor has represented Netherlands at under-19, under-20 and under-21 level.

== Personal life ==
Born in the Netherlands, Foor is of Indonesian descent.

== Career statistics ==
As of match played 20 December 2025

Appearances and goals by club, season and competition
| Club | Season | League | | | National cup | | Europe | | Other | | Total | |
| Club | Season | Division | Apps | Goals | Apps | Goals | Apps | Goals | Apps | Goals | Apps | Goals |
|---|---|---|---|---|---|---|---|---|---|---|---|---|
| NEC | 2011–12 | Eredivisie | 30 | 2 | 3 | 0 | — | | — | | 33 | 2 |
| NEC | 2012–13 | Eredivisie | 29 | 0 | 1 | 0 | — | | — | | 30 | 0 |
| NEC | 2013–14 | Eredivisie | 24 | 2 | 4 | 1 | — | | 0 | 0 | 28 | 3 |
| NEC | 2014–15 | Eerste Divisie | 37 | 7 | 2 | 0 | — | | — | | 39 | 7 |
| NEC | 2015–16 | Eredivisie | 34 | 4 | 3 | 1 | — | | — | | 37 | 5 |
| NEC | Total | | 154 | 15 | 13 | 2 | — | | 0 | 0 | 167 | 17 |
| Vitesse | 2016–17 | Eredivisie | 29 | 6 | 5 | 0 | — | | — | | 34 | 6 |
| Vitesse | 2017–18 | Eredivisie | 30 | 3 | 1 | 0 | 5 (Note: Appearance(s) in UEFA Europa League) | 0 | 5 (Note: One appearance in Johan Cruyff Shield, four in Eredivisie European play-offs) | 0 | 41 | 3 |
| Vitesse | 2018–19 | Eredivisie | 30 | 5 | 4 | 0 | 4 | 0 | 4 (Note: Appearances in Eredivisie European play-offs) | 0 | 42 | 5 |
| Vitesse | 2019–20 | Eredivisie | 17 | 0 | 1 | 0 | 0 | 0 | — | | 18 | 0 |
| Vitesse | Total | | 106 | 14 | 11 | 0 | 9 | 0 | 9 | 0 | 135 | 14 |
| Ittihad Kalba | 2019–20 | UAE Pro League | 5 | 0 | — | | — | | — | | 5 | 0 |
| Pafos | 2020–21 | Cypriot First Division | 34 | 1 | 1 | 0 | — | | — | | 35 | 1 |
| Pafos | 2021–22 | Cypriot First Division | 26 | 0 | 1 | 0 | — | | — | | 27 | 0 |
| Pafos | Total | | 60 | 1 | 2 | 0 | 0 | 0 | 0 | 0 | 62 | 1 |
| Riga | 2022 | Latvian Higher League | 11 | 0 | 0 | 0 | — | | — | | 11 | 0 |
| Cambuur | 2022–23 | Eredivisie | 15 | 2 | 0 | 0 | — | | — | | 15 | 2 |
| Karmiotissa | 2023–24 | Cypriot First Division | 15 | 2 | 0 | 0 | — | | — | | 15 | 2 |
| Bandırmaspor | 2023–24 | TFF First League | 8 | 1 | 2 | 0 | — | | — | | 10 | 1 |
| VVV-Venlo | 2024–25 | Eerste Divisie | 14 | 2 | 0 | 0 | — | | — | | 14 | 2 |
| VVV-Venlo | 2025–26 | Eerste Divisie | 20 | 1 | 0 | 0 | — | | — | | 20 | 1 |
| Career total | | | 408 | 38 | 28 | 2 | 9 | 0 | 9 | 0 | 454 | 40 |
