= Kjelt Engbers =

Dutch footballer (born 1999)

Personal information
- Date of birth: 14 September 1999 (age 27)
- Place of birth: Emmen, Netherlands
- Height: 1.85 m (6 ft 1 in)
- Position: Centre-back

Team information
- Current team: Staphorst
- Number: 15

Youth career
- 2011–2018: Emmen

Senior career*
Years	Team	Apps	(Gls)
2018–2019	Emmen	1	(0)
2019–2022	Hoogeveen	53	(7)
2022–	Staphorst	62	(2)
- * Club domestic league appearances and goals as of 16:47, 8 November 2024 (UTC)

Kjelt Engbers (born 14 September 1999) is a Dutch professional footballer who plays as a centre-back for the Vierde Divisie club Staphorst.

== Professional career ==
Engbers made his professional debut in a 1–1 Eredivisie tie with SC Heerenveen on 4 November 2018.

On 30 January 2019 FC Emmen announced, that Engbers had signed with Hoogeveen.

In July 2022, Engbers signed with Staphorst in the Vierde Divisie. He wears the no.15 jersey in honor of his father-in-law who also played with that number on senior amateur level.
