= Khalid Karami =

Dutch professional footballer (born 1989)

Personal information
- Full name: Khalid Karami
- Date of birth: 29 December 1989 (age 36)
- Place of birth: Amsterdam, Netherlands
- Height: 1.81 m (5 ft 11 in)
- Position: Right back

Youth career
- TOG
- SC Oriënt
- –2007: Zeeburgia
- 2007–2008: RKC Waalwijk

Senior career*
Years	Team	Apps	(Gls)
2008–2010	DWS		
2010–2011	Watergraafsmeer		
2011–2013	Go Ahead Eagles	65	(3)
2013–2018	Excelsior	140	(4)
2018–2020	Vitesse	0	(0)
2019	→ NAC Breda (loan)	10	(0)
2019–2020	→ Sparta Rotterdam (loan)	6	(0)
2022	APS Zakynthos	11	(0)
- * Club domestic league appearances and goals as of 6 January 2023

Khalid Karami (born 29 December 1989) is a Dutch professional footballer who plays as a right back.

== Club career ==
Karami was born in Amsterdam. Prior to joining Go Ahead Eagles in 2011, he had spells in the Dutch lower leagues with DWS and Watergraafsmeer. On 5 August 2011, he made his Eerste Divisie debut during Go Ahead Eagles' 1–0 home victory over Telstar, playing the full 90 minutes. Karami went onto appear seventy-two more times, scoring four goals for Go Ahead Eagles before making the move to fellow Eerste Divisie side Excelsior in August 2013. Later that month, he made his debut during their 1–0 away defeat against Emmen, replacing Elso Brito in the 52nd minute. During the following campaign in which Excelsior secured promotion back to the Eredivisie, Karami struggled for regular gametime, however netted his first goal for the club during their 3–3 draw with AZ. Following his debut season in the Eredivisie, Karami turned his fortunes and quickly became a key figure in Excelsior's starting eleven, featuring over 90 times in the next three years.

On 8 May 2018, Karami signed a pre-contract deal to join fellow Eredivisie side, Vitesse. Signing on a two-year deal following his imminent release from Excelsior. On 1 January 2019, it was announced Karami would spend the rest of the season on loan with NAC Breda.

== Career statistics ==
As of match played 26 September 2018.

Club	Season	League			KNVB Cup		Europe		Other		Total	
Club	Season	Division	Apps	Goals	Apps	Goals	Apps	Goals	Apps	Goals	Apps	Goals
Go Ahead Eagles	2011–12	Eerste Divisie	33	3	2	0	—		2	0	37	3
Go Ahead Eagles	2012–13	Eerste Divisie	32	0	3	1	—		1	0	36	1
Go Ahead Eagles	Total		65	3	5	1	—		3	0	73	4
Excelsior	2013–14	Eerste Divisie	32	0	3	0	—		4	1	39	1
Excelsior	2014–15	Eredivisie	18	1	2	0	—		—		20	1
Excelsior	2015–16	Eredivisie	31	0	1	0	—		—		32	0
Excelsior	2016–17	Eredivisie	33	2	2	0	—		—		35	2
Excelsior	2017–18	Eredivisie	27	1	1	0	—		—		28	1
Excelsior	Total		141	4	9	0	—		4	1	154	5
Vitesse	2018–19	Eredivisie	0	0	1	0	0	0	—		1	0
Career total			206	7	15	1	0	0	7	1	228	9
