= Maikel van der Werff =

Dutch footballer (born 1989)

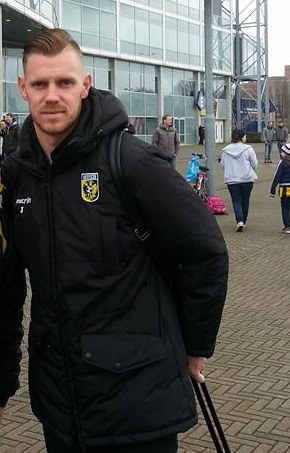
- van der Werff with Vitesse in 2016

Personal information
- Date of birth: 22 April 1989 (age 37)
- Place of birth: Hoorn, Netherlands
- Height: 1.85 m (6 ft 1 in)
- Position: Centre-back

Youth career
- Always Forward
- Hollandia
- –2008: FC Volendam

Senior career*
Years	Team	Apps	(Gls)
2008–2013	FC Volendam	72	(11)
2013–2015	PEC Zwolle	63	(5)
2015–2019	Vitesse	77	(3)
2019–2021	FC Cincinnati	24	(0)
2022	PEC Zwolle	11	(0)
Total		247	(19)
- * Club domestic league appearances and goals

Maikel van der Werff (born 22 April 1989) is a Dutch former professional footballer who played as a centre-back. He played for Volendam, Vitesse, FC Cincinnati and PEC Zwolle.

== Club career ==
=== Volendam ===
Born in Hoorn, van der Werff joined FC Volendam at a young age, having played for Hollandia and Always Forward. On 12 November 2008, van der Werff made his FC Volendam debut in a 1–0 victory over Ajax in a KNVB Cup third round tie, replacing Marijn Sterk in the 87th minute. On 13 November 2009, van der Werff scored his first FC Volendam goal in a 5–2 defeat against MVV, netting the equalizer.

=== PEC Zwolle ===
On 30 January 2013, after impressing at FC Volendam, van der Werff joined PEC Zwolle on a two-and-a-half-year deal for a fee reported to be around the margin of £140,000. On 10 March 2013, one month after joining the club, van der Werff made his PEC Zwolle debut in a 3–0 defeat against Ajax. On 30 March 2014, van der Werff scored his first PEC Zwolle goal in a 1–1 draw against ADO Den Haag, netting in the 21st minute. van der Werff was part of the squad that won the KNVB Cup in 2014, playing all but one game in their victorious campaign.

=== Vitesse ===
On 19 February 2015, it was announced that van der Werff would join Vitesse on the expiry of his contract at the end of the season. On 20 September 2015, van der Werff made his Vitesse debut in a 3–0 victory over local rivals De Graafschap, replacing Kevin Diks in the 27th minute.

He played as Vitesse won the final of the KNVB Cup 2–0 against AZ Alkmaar on 30 April 2017 to help the club, 3-time runners up, to the title for the first time in its 125-year history.

=== FC Cincinnati ===
On 2 July 2019, it was announced that van der Werff would join FC Cincinnati as a defender. His contract expired in December 2021 after a disappointing tenure in which he appeared in just 24 matches and spent the entire 2021 season rehabbing injuries. Van der Werff occupied a valuable international roster spot and was on $350,000 in base salary in 2021.

=== Return to PEC Zwolle ===
On 21 January 2022, van der Werff returned to PEC Zwolle on a six-months deal.

After his contract expired in June 2022, van der Werff became a free agent. In October 2023, it was announced that he had retired from professional football, instead focusing on a coaching career.

== Career statistics ==
Appearances and goals by club, season and competition
Club	Season	League			National cup		Continental		Other		Total	
Club	Season	Division	Apps	Goals	Apps	Goals	Apps	Goals	Apps	Goals	Apps	Goals
FC Volendam	2008–09	Eredivisie	0	0	1	0	—		—		1	0
FC Volendam	2009–10	Eerste Divisie	19	1	0	0	—		—		19	1
FC Volendam	2010–11	Eerste Divisie	18	3	3	0	—		—		21	3
FC Volendam	2011–12	Eerste Divisie	18	6	0	0	—		—		18	6
FC Volendam	2012–13	Eerste Divisie	17	1	1	0	—		—		18	1
FC Volendam	Total		72	11	5	0	—		—		77	11
PEC Zwolle	2012–13	Eredivisie	6	0	0	0	—		—		6	0
PEC Zwolle	2013–14	Eredivisie	24	1	5	2	—		—		29	3
PEC Zwolle	2014–15	Eredivisie	33	4	5	0	2 (Note: Appearance(s) in UEFA Europa League)	0	2 (Note: Appearance(s) in Eredivisie European play-offs)	1	42	5
PEC Zwolle	Total		63	5	10	2	2	0	2	1	77	8
Vitesse	2015–16	Eredivisie	26	0	1	0	1	0	—		28	0
Vitesse	2016–17	Eredivisie	17	0	3	0	—		0	0	20	0
Vitesse	2017–18	Eredivisie	12	0	1	0	1	0	2	0	16	0
Vitesse	2018–19	Eredivisie	22	3	2	1	3	0	4	0	31	4
Vitesse	Total		77	3	7	1	5	0	6	0	95	4
FC Cincinnati	2019	MLS	11	0	0	0	—		—		11	0
FC Cincinnati	2020	MLS	13	0	—		—		1 (Note: Appearance(s) in MLS is Back Tournament)	0	14	0
FC Cincinnati	Total		24	0	0	0	—		1	0	25	0
PEC Zwolle	2021–22	Eredivisie	11	0	0	0	—		—		11	0
Career total			247	19	22	3	7	0	9	1	285	23

== Honours ==
=== Club ===
PEC Zwolle

- KNVB Cup: 2013–14

Vitesse

- KNVB Cup: 2016–17
